= List of kidnappings (2010–2019) =

The following is a list of kidnappings that occurred in the 2010s, summarizing the events of each case, including instances of celebrity abductions, claimed hoaxes, suspected kidnappings, extradition abductions, and mass kidnappings.

== 2010 ==
Date	Image	Victim	Abductor	Location	Age of victim	Outcome	Notes
30 January 2010		Naga Vaishnavi	Morla Srinivas Rao, Jagadeesh, and Venkata Rao	Andhra Pradesh, India	10	Murdered	Vaishnavi was kidnapped and murdered three days after her abduction.
2 April 2010		Vincent Binder	Kentrell Johnson, Peter Hughes, and Quentin Truehill	Florida, United States	29	Murdered	Vincent Binder, a 29-year-old graduate student of Florida State University, was kidnapped and murdered by three fugitives who escaped from a Louisiana state jail. Truehill was sentenced to death while both Hughes and Johnson were given life sentences for the crime.
15 May 2010		Hostages of the 2010 Kurram agency mass kidnapping	Taliban militants (suspected)	Kurram District, Pakistan	Various	Rescued	61 people, predominantly civilians, were held hostages by militants posing as policemen from a convoy en route to Parachinar, most of whom were later released. No group has claimed responsibility for the incident, but the Pakistani government has accused the Taliban of orchestrating it.
4 June 2010		Kyron Horman	Unknown	(United States) Portland, Oregon, U.S.	7	Unknown	Horman disappeared when he did not return home from Skyline Elementary School. Local and state police along with the FBI conducted an exhaustive search for the boy and launched a criminal investigation, but have not uncovered any significant information regarding his whereabouts.
8 June 2010		Khan Kakama	Gordon Tumusiime	Bugolobi, Kampala, Uganda	1	Murdered	Kakama was handed to the kidnappers by Molly Nabasa, his nanny. His parents, Sven and Naome Karekaho, work(ed) for the Uganda Revenue Authority and National Environmental Management Authority, respectively.
9 June 2010		Eliza Samudio	Bruno Fernandes, Luiz Romão, Marcos dos Santos, Elenilson da Silva, Wemerson de Souza, Fernanda de Castro	Esmeraldas, Minas Gerais, Brazil	25	Murdered	Samudio, the mother of footballer Bruno Fernandes's illegitimate child, disappeared while suing Fernandes for child support. One perpetrator later testified that Samudio was abducted, strangled and fed to dogs on orders from Fernandes. Fernandes and several others were ultimately convicted of conspiring in her kidnap and murder.
4 September 2010		Umar Cheema	ISI operatives (alleged)	Pakistan	34	Released	Investigative reporter for The News International who was abducted, beaten, flogged and sexually assaulted by an unidentified group of men, who he claimed to be ISI operatives who had targeted him due to his journalistic work.
20 October 2010		Yessenia Argelis Loo Kam	Gilberto Ventura Ceballos, Jose Alcibiades Mendez	La Chorrera, Panama	18	Murdered	On 20 October 2010, 18 year old Yessenia Loo Kam was kidnapped while driving her car on Las Américas Avenue in La Chorrera, Panama by Gilberto Ventura Ceballos and Jose Alcibiades Mendez. Ceballos and Mendez demanded $200,000 from Loo Kam's parents for her release, but no agreement was made. On 22 October Loo Kam was shot to death by Ceballos.
8 November 2010		Gregorio Barradas Miravete	Unknown	Isla, Veracruz, Mexico	28	Murdered	Gregorio Barradas Miravete was a National Action Party politician who was kidnapped and killed in Isla, Veracruz.
10 November 2010		Sarah Maynard	Matthew Hoffman	(United States) Mount Vernon, Ohio, U.S.	13	Rescued	Hoffman killed Sarah's mother, brother, and mother's friend before kidnapping her and holding her captive in his basement in a bed of leaves. Hoffman admitted to raping her and was arrested in November by two arriving officers who rescued Sarah.
12 November 2010		Anni Dewani	Zola Robert Tongo, Mziwamadoda Qwabe, Xolile Mngeni	Gugulethu, Cape Town, South Africa	28	Murdered	During a night trip through the Township of Gugulethu, the taxi was hijacked. Husband Shrien was dropped off in the neighboring township of Khayelitsha while Anni, a Swedish woman of Indian descent, was kept. The vehicle was found the next day with Anni's beaten and bruised body in the back seat. Shrien was suspected of masterminding the kidnapping and murder of his wife.
12 November 2010		Shrien Dewani	Zola Robert Tongo, Mziwamadoda Qwabe, Xolile Mngeni	Gugulethu, Cape Town, South Africa	31	Released	During a night trip through the Township of Gugulethu, the taxi was hijacked. Husband Shrien was dropped off in the neighboring township of Khayelitsha while Anni, a Swedish woman of Indian descent, was kept. The vehicle was found the next day with Anni's beaten and bruised body in the back seat. Shrien was suspected of masterminding the kidnapping and murder of his wife.
25 November 2010		Andrew Skelton	John Skelton	(United States) Morenci, Michigan, USA	9	Unknown (declared dead)	The three boys' mother had custody of them, but they were at their father's house for Thanksgiving when last seen. Their father was convicted of kidnapping them, and still claims they are alive, though police believe he murdered them. In 2025 a court ruled that the Skelton children died the day after their disappearance, but rejected a request to declare that they were murdered.
25 November 2010		Alexander Skelton	John Skelton	(United States) Morenci, Michigan, USA	7	Unknown (declared dead)	The three boys' mother had custody of them, but they were at their father's house for Thanksgiving when last seen. Their father was convicted of kidnapping them, and still claims they are alive, though police believe he murdered them. In 2025 a court ruled that the Skelton children died the day after their disappearance, but rejected a request to declare that they were murdered.
25 November 2010		Tanner Skelton	John Skelton	(United States) Morenci, Michigan, USA	5	Unknown (declared dead)	The three boys' mother had custody of them, but they were at their father's house for Thanksgiving when last seen. Their father was convicted of kidnapping them, and still claims they are alive, though police believe he murdered them. In 2025 a court ruled that the Skelton children died the day after their disappearance, but rejected a request to declare that they were murdered.
9 December 2010		Yong Jian Wu	Gilberto Ventura Ceballos, Jose Alcibiades Mendez	Colón, Panama	27	Murdered	On 9 December 2010, Yong Jian Wu went to buy eight cell phones from Méndez and Ventura Ceballos. Wu was then kidnapped by Mendez and Ceballos and held for ransom. Wu's family paid them $83,000 for Wu's release, but he was ultimately murdered on 14 December.

== 2011 ==
Date	Image	Victim	Abductor	Location	Age of victim	Outcome	Notes
19 March 2011		Sian O'Callaghan	Christopher Halliwell	Swindon, Wiltshire, England	22	Murdered	O'Callaghan was abducted by taxi driver Christopher Halliwell after leaving a nightclub in Swindon and driven to the Savernake Forest, where she was stabbed to death. Her body was buried near Uffington, Oxfordshire.
13 April 2011		Holly Bobo	Zach Adams, John Dylan Adams, Jason Autry (alleged)	(United States) Darden, Tennessee, U.S.	20	Murdered	Bobo's brother witnessed her walking into the woods outside their home with a man wearing camouflage. Three years later, in 2014, four men were arrested for varying degrees of involvement in the kidnapping. A woman has alleged that she saw a video of Holly Bobo tied up and crying, although the video has not been located. Bobo's body was found in September 2014. Ultimately, Zach Adams, John Dylan Adams, and Jason Autry were convicted or pled guilty to involvement in Bobo's kidnap and murder, but their guilt remains a matter of dispute.
29 April 2011		Hamza Ali Al-Khateeb	Syrian government	Daraa, Syria	13	Murdered	Syrian boy detained by government officials while attempting to break the Siege of Daraa. After his detention, Al-Khateeb was viciously tortured and eventually killed, before his mutilated body was returned to his family.
11 May 2011		Timmothy James Pitzen	Amy Fry-Pitzen	(United States) Wisconsin Dells, Wisconsin, U.S.	6	Unknown	Timmothy was taken out of school by his mother, Amy Fry-Pitzen, but she did not bring him home. His father, James Pitzen, reported both missing that day. Amy called some family members to tell them she was all right, with Timmothy saying he was hungry in the background. Her body was found, having killed herself, on 14 May. She left a note behind stating that Timmothy was safe and would never be found. Timmothy was not with her the last time she was seen alive, and his whereabouts are still unknown.
27 May 2011		Saleem Shahzad	ISI operatives (alleged)	Islamabad, Pakistan	40	Murdered	Investigative journalist who was abducted, tortured and killed, presumably by ISI agents, for his writings criticizing the government and raising questions about kidnappings of fellow journalists.
June 2011		Nesreen Irsan	Ali, Alrawabdeh, and Nadia Irsan	(United States) Montgomery County, Texas, U.S.	c. 23	Escaped	Nesreen Irsan was held captive by members of her Muslim family after they found out she was dating a Christian named Coty Beavers. She escaped through a window and fled with Beavers to Spring, where they were married; her family later tracked down and murdered Beavers in retaliation.
11 July 2011		Leiby Kletzky	Levi Aron	(United States) New York City, U.S.	8	Murdered	Kletzky was kidnapped on his way home from day camp in his Hasidic Jewish neighborhood. The alleged killer was apprehended 32 hours later; he confessed to killing the boy and dismembering his body, but entered a plea of not guilty in court.
September 2011		Sarah Dominique Broady	Unknown	(United States) Killeen, Texas, U.S.	Unknown	Rescued	The mother and daughter were allegedly kidnapped by the child's father during an unscheduled visitation. Details of the case have been withheld by the court.
September 2011		Jaiyana Hodges-Broady	Unknown	(United States) Killeen, Texas, U.S.	3 months	Rescued	The mother and daughter were allegedly kidnapped by the child's father during an unscheduled visitation. Details of the case have been withheld by the court.
7 September 2011		Samy Zeng Chen	Gilberto Ventura Ceballos, Jose Alcibiades Mendez	La Chorrera, Panama	19	Murdered	On 7 September 2011, Samy Zeng Chen's car was rammed by Jose Alcibiades Mendez while driving on the Arraiján-La Chorrera highway in La Chorrera, Panama. Méndez walked toward him under the pretext of apologizing, but as soon as he got out of his car Ceballos and Mendez overpowered Chen with a pellet gun. then kidnapped Chen alongside his two other passengers, Georgina Del Carmen Lee Chen and Joel Mauricio Liu Wong. In the struggle Chen was shot in the buttocks. Chen was stabbed in the leg by Mendez on that same day while Lee Chen and Wong were held for ransom. On an unknown date Lee Chen was buried alive alongside Samy Zeng Chen's corpse. Liu Wong's family paid $160,000 for his release, but he was murdered by Ceballos on 13 September.
7 September 2011		Georgina Del Carmen Lee Chen	Gilberto Ventura Ceballos, Jose Alcibiades Mendez	La Chorrera, Panama	18	Murdered	
7 September 2011		Joel Mauricio Liu Wong	Gilberto Ventura Ceballos, Jose Alcibiades Mendez	La Chorrera, Panama	19	Murdered	
3 October 2011		Lisa Irwin	Unknown	(United States) Kansas City, Missouri, U.S.	10 months	Unknown	Irwin disappeared from her home in the early hours of the morning. Investigators to this day have not given any indication that she was kidnapped by an outside intruder.
25 October 2011		Jessica Buchanan	Somalian Pirates	Galkayo, Somalia	32	Rescued	An American woman and a Danish man who had been working on a demining project with the Danish Refugee Council; both were kidnapped by Somali pirates in Galkayo. The two were held for ransom, but were rescued by United States Navy SEALs on January 25, 2012.
25 October 2011		Poul Hagen Thisted	Somalian Pirates	Galkayo, Somalia	60	Rescued	An American woman and a Danish man who had been working on a demining project with the Danish Refugee Council; both were kidnapped by Somali pirates in Galkayo. The two were held for ransom, but were rescued by United States Navy SEALs on January 25, 2012.
9 November 2011		Wilson Ramos	Unknown	Valencia, Venezuela	24	Rescued	A Venezuelan professional baseball catcher, Ramos was kidnapped at gunpoint from outside his mother's home and held by his captors inside a mountain hideout. He was freed by police after 51 hours of captivity.

== 2012 ==
Date	Victim	Abductor	Location	Age of victim	Outcome	Notes
1 February 2012	Samantha Koenig	Israel Keyes	Anchorage, Alaska, U.S.	18	Murdered	Serial killer Israel Keyes kidnapped Koenig from her workplace, sexually assaulted her, and killed her before going on a two-week cruise in the Gulf of Mexico. After returning he took a photo of her body, set up to look as though she was still alive, in order to demand a large ransom payment before dismembering her body and disposing of her in Matanuska Lake.
21 April 2012	Isabel Celis	Christopher Clements	Tucson, Arizona, U.S.	6	Murdered	Celis' father reported her missing around 8 am when she was not in her room. A bedroom window had been opened with the screen removed. On 31 March 2017, her remains were found. On April 10, 2024, Clements was sentenced to life in prison for her murder and kidnapping.
26 June 2012	Sierra Newbold	Terry Lee Black	West Jordan, Utah, U.S.	6	Murdered	Sierra Newbold was kidnapped from her home and raped and strangled by Black, who left her in a nearby canal to drown. She was found by a search party later the same day. Black, who had been diagnosed with schizophrenia and other psychiatric issues, was found competent to stand trial. He accepted an Alford plea and was given a sentence of 65 years-to-life in prison.
12 August 2012	Hüseyin Aygün	PKK militants	Ovacık, Turkey	42	Released	CHP politician and lawyer who was kidnapped by PKK militants while travelling along a highway. While his aides were immediately released, he was held in detention for two days before being released without harm.
1 October 2012	April Jones	Mark Bridger	Machynlleth, Wales	5	Murdered	Jones was lured into a van by Bridger, and a massive search was conducted to find her. Bridger killed her soon afterward, but only small fragments of her body have been found.
5 October 2012	Jessica Ridgeway	Austin Sigg	Westminster, Colorado, U.S.	10	Murdered	Jessica Ridgeway was a 10-year-old girl who was kidnapped and murdered on 5 October 2012 while walking to school. She did not return home from school and an Amber alert was issued. On 10 October, her dismembered remains were found in a ditch in a park in Arvada. Her abductor was 17-year-old Austin Sigg, and he was sentenced to life imprisonment on 19 November 2013.
c. 8 October 2012	Joshua Boyle	Haqqani network	Maidan Wardak Province, Afghanistan	34	Rescued	Married couple taken captive by Taliban-backed militants and held for five years. They were rescued by the Pakistani army in 2017.
c. 8 October 2012	Caitlan Coleman	Haqqani network	Maidan Wardak Province, Afghanistan	31	Rescued	Married couple taken captive by Taliban-backed militants and held for five years. They were rescued by the Pakistani army in 2017.
20 November 2012	Jersey Bridgeman	Zachary Holly	Bentonville, Arkansas, U.S.	6	Murdered	Jersey Bridgeman was kidnapped from her home after Holly, who was babysitting her, put her to bed. She was sexually assaulted and suffocated. Authorities later found her in a vacant home nearby. Holly was arrested and charged with capital murder, rape, kidnapping and residential burglary, subsequently convicted and sentenced to the death penalty. David and Jana Bridgeman, Jersey's father and stepmother, had previously pled guilty on child abuse charges.
22 November 2012	James Foley	Islamic State	Syria	40	Murdered	Journalists kidnapped by Islamic State while working on a film about a previous incident in which Cantlie had been kidnapped. Two years later, the IS cell known as "The Beatles" released a video in which Foley was beheaded by Mohammed Emwazi. Cantlie's fate is unknown, but he is presumed dead.
22 November 2012	John Cantlie	Islamic State	Syria	42	Unknown	Journalists kidnapped by Islamic State while working on a film about a previous incident in which Cantlie had been kidnapped. Two years later, the IS cell known as "The Beatles" released a video in which Foley was beheaded by Mohammed Emwazi. Cantlie's fate is unknown, but he is presumed dead.
12 December 2012	Miroslav Mišković	Criminal organization	Serbia	67	Released	A Serbian oligarch, business magnate, investor and owner of Delta Holding. Mišković and several others were kidnapped on 12 December 2012. He was released from custody on 22 July 2013, after posting a €12 million bail.

== 2013 ==
Date	Victim	Abductor	Location	Age of victim	Outcome	Notes
29 January 2013	Ethan Gilman	Jimmy Lee Dykes	Midland City, Alabama, U.S.	5	Rescued	Dykes, a 65-year-old Vietnam War-era veteran, boarded a Dale County school bus, killed the driver, and took Gilman hostage. On the afternoon of 4 February, law enforcement agents entered the bunker where Dykes was keeping Gilman, killed Dykes, and rescued Gilman.
March 2013	David Haines	Islamic State	Atmeh refugee camp, Idlib, Syria	43	Murdered	Aid worker kidnapped by Islamic State while working at a displaced person's camp in Syria. The following year, the IS cell known as "The Beatles" released a video in which Haines was beheaded by Mohammed Emwazi.
26 April 2013	Jessica Heeringa	Jeffrey Willis	Norton Shores, Michigan, U.S.	25	Murdered	Heeringa was abducted while working the night shift at an Exxon gas station in Norton Shores. Her body was never found, but Jeffrey Willis was convicted of her abduction and murder in 2018. His cousin Kevin Bluhm testified to helping him dispose of the body.
21 June 2013	Cherish Perrywinkle	Donald James Smith	Jacksonville, Florida, U.S.	8	Murdered	Cherish Lily Perrywinkle was with her mother, Rayne Perrywinkle, and two sisters at a Dollar General when they met Donald Smith, who took them to a local Walmart to shop with a gift card. Smith suggested they get food at a nearby McDonald's and Cherish went with him, but surveillance cameras indicated he left the store with her, after which she vanished. She was found the next day, sexually assaulted and strangled. Smith was apprehended and found guilty of the child's abduction, rape, and murder, and sentenced to capital punishment in the Florida courts.
3 August 2013	Hannah Anderson	James DiMaggio	National City, California, U.S.	16	Rescued	DiMaggio, a friend of the Anderson family, murdered Hannah Anderson's mother and brother, burned her house down and kidnapped her. A week after the abduction, FBI agents tracked down and killed DiMaggio and recovered Anderson unharmed.
4 August 2013	Steven Sotloff	Islamic State	Aleppo, Syria	30	Murdered	Journalist who was kidnapped by Islamic State while covering the Syrian Civil War. The following year, the IS cell known as "The Beatles" released a video in which Sotloff was beheaded by Mohammed Emwazi.
4 August 2013	Kayla Mueller	Islamic State	Aleppo, Syria	24	Died (circumstances unclear)	Aid worker kidnapped by Islamic State while being driven to the Turkish border. While captive, she was reportedly raped and tortured by several high-ranking Islamic State members, including the group's leader Abu Bakr al-Baghdadi. Islamic State later declared that Mueller was killed in an airstrike, although some reports indicated that al-Baghdadi may have ordered her death.
22 August 2013	Unidentified young woman (name withheld)	Charles Atkins Lewis Jr.	Seagoville, Texas, U.S.	25	Rescued	Atkins kidnapped his victim at knifepoint as she left a networking conference before forcing her into her vehicle, which he commandeered. Both investigators and the young woman believe he intended to rape, and very likely kill his captive. The victim was rescued when two teenagers, Aaron Arias and Jamal Harris, observed her pleading for help through the window of her vehicle at a stoplight. The teenagers called 9-1-1 to report a kidnapping and followed the vehicle as they updated police with progress as to the pursuit. Atkins was arrested 40 miles from the site where the teenagers initially observed the woman's ordeal.
1 October 2013	Peter Kassig	Islamic State	Deir Ezzour, Syria	25	Murdered	Aid worker kidnapped by Islamic State while delivering food and medical supplies to refugees in Syria. The following year, the IS cell known as "The Beatles" released a video in which Kassig was beheaded by Mohammed Emwazi.
6 November 2013	Bethany Arceneaux	Scott Thomas	Lafayette, Louisiana, U.S.	29	Rescued	Arceneaux, a twenty-nine-year-old mother, was abducted by her ex-boyfriend Scott Thomas while picking her young son up from daycare. Two days later, Arceneaux's family located the house Thomas was holding her in and kicked down the door, where they found Thomas stabbing Arceneaux repeatedly. One of them shot Thomas dead and Arceneaux made a full recovery. Nobody was charged in Thomas's death.
17 December 2013	Heather Elvis	Sidney Moorer, Tammy Moorer	Carolina Forest, South Carolina, U.S.	20	Unknown	Heather Elvis left her apartment on the night of 17 December to meet Sidney Moorer, a married man with whom she had a past affair, after he apparently offered to resume their relationship. She was never seen again. Sidney and his wife Tammy were convicted of kidnapping her and are serving 30-year prison sentences. They were previously charged with murdering Elvis, but the charge was dismissed in 2015, although it could be re-filed in the future should the prosecution so wish.
26 December 2013	Alan Henning	Islamic State	Al-Dana, Syria	46	Murdered	Aid worker kidnapped by Islamic State while delivering aid to refugees in Syria. The following year, the IS cell known as "The Beatles" released a video in which Henning was beheaded by Mohammed Emwazi.

== 2014 ==
Date	Victim	Abductor	Location	Age of victim	Outcome	Notes
8 January 2014	Ng Lye Poh	Heng Chen Boon and Lee Sze Yong	Hougang, Singapore	79	Released	Known as the Sheng Siong kidnapping case, 79-year-old Ng Lye Poh, the mother of the founder CEO of popular supermarket chain Sheng Siong, was kidnapped by two men Lee Sze Yong and Heng Chen Boon, who demanded a ransom of S$20 million from her son, and the ransom amount was later brought down to S$2 million after negotiations. After the ransom was paid, Ng was released and less than an hour later, her abductors were both arrested and charged with kidnapping for ransom. Eventually, Heng pleaded guilty to a reduced charge of wrongful abduction and confinement, and jailed for three years. Lee, who was identified as the mastermind, was found guilty of kidnapping for ransom, and sentenced to life imprisonment and three strokes of the cane on 1 December 2016.
18 February 2014	Hailey Owens	Craig Michael Wood	Springfield, Missouri, U.S.	10	Murdered	Hailey Owens was walking home from a friend's house when a man in a truck pulled over, called her, and asked for directions. As she approached him, he grabbed her, threw her into his truck, and sped away. Her body was found in the home of 45-year-old Craig Michael Wood, in Springfield. She was raped and shot in the back of the head. Wood was found guilty of first-degree murder and was sentenced to death by lethal injection.
24 February 2014	Antonio Cermeño	Unknown	Miranda, Venezuela	44	Murdered	Venezuelan boxer and two-time world title champion who was kidnapped with his wife by unidentified assailants in east Caracas. While his wife escaped, Cermeño could not, and his body was found a day later along a highway.
27 February 2014	Benjamín Galván Gómez	Los Zetas gang members	Tamaulipas, Mexico	41	Murdered	Businessman, PRI politician and mayor of Nuevo Laredo, Tamaulipas between 2011 and 2013. Frequently threatened due to his anti-organized crime sentiment, Galván was abducted from a drugstore on 27 February 2014. His mutilated corpse was found the next day, and positively identified a month later. Several suspected Los Zetas members were arrested for his murder, but all were killed before they could go to trial.
19 March 2014	Serhiy Hayduk	Pro-Russian security services	Sevastopol, Ukraine	51	Released	Ukrainian Navy commander who was tortured by pro-Russian security forces who had taken over the Navy's headquarters in Sevastopol. He and several others were released on the following day on orders from the Russian Defense Minister.
1 May 2014	Shelly Dadon	Hussein Khalifa	Migdal HaEmek, Israel	19	Murdered	Shelly Dadon was a 19-year-old Israeli woman who was driven to a parking lot in an industrial area by Hussein Khalifa, a taxi driver who later confessed to having stabbed her to death.
12 June 2014	Naphtali Frankel	Marwan Kawasme, Amar Abu Aysha, Hussam Qawasmeh	Gush Etzion, West Bank	16	Murdered	Israeli teenagers kidnapped and later murdered by militants from a bus stop. The two main suspects were later killed in a shootout with police, while a third was sentenced to three life terms.
12 June 2014	Gilad Shar	Marwan Kawasme, Amar Abu Aysha, Hussam Qawasmeh	Gush Etzion, West Bank	16	Murdered	Israeli teenagers kidnapped and later murdered by militants from a bus stop. The two main suspects were later killed in a shootout with police, while a third was sentenced to three life terms.
12 June 2014	Ayal Yiphrach	Marwan Kawasme, Amar Abu Aysha, Hussam Qawasmeh	Gush Etzion, West Bank	19	Murdered	Israeli teenagers kidnapped and later murdered by militants from a bus stop. The two main suspects were later killed in a shootout with police, while a third was sentenced to three life terms.
29 June 2014	Nathan O'Brien	Douglas Garland	Calgary, Alberta, Canada	5	Murdered	Garland, in the culmination of a long-running dispute with Liknes, broke into his house and assaulted him, his wife Kathryn, and their grandson O'Brien before forcibly transporting them to his rural property, where he tortured them to death and cremated their bodies.
29 June 2014	Kathryn Liknes	Douglas Garland	Calgary, Alberta, Canada	53	Murdered	Garland, in the culmination of a long-running dispute with Liknes, broke into his house and assaulted him, his wife Kathryn, and their grandson O'Brien before forcibly transporting them to his rural property, where he tortured them to death and cremated their bodies.
29 June 2014	Alvin Liknes	Douglas Garland	Calgary, Alberta, Canada	66	Murdered	Garland, in the culmination of a long-running dispute with Liknes, broke into his house and assaulted him, his wife Kathryn, and their grandson O'Brien before forcibly transporting them to his rural property, where he tortured them to death and cremated their bodies.
2 July 2014	Mohammed Abu Khdeir	Yosef Ben-David	Jerusalem Forest, Israel	16	Murdered	Khdeir, a Palestinian teenager, was forced into a car by a group of three Israeli citizens enraged over the kidnapping and murder of three Israeli teenagers. Israeli police found his beaten and charred body within the hour. Yosef Ben-David was found guilty of the murder, and two minors were found guilty of assisting him.
20 July 2014	Oron Shaul	Hamas	near Shuja'iyya, Gaza Strip	21	Murdered, body taken hostage	Oron Shaul, a 21-year-old IDF sergeant, was kidnapped by members of the Izz ad-Din al-Qassam Brigade after an anti-tank missile was fired at an Israeli army tank during the Battle of Shuja'iyya. As of 2020, the bodies of Shaul and fellow IDF soldier Hadar Goldin are still being ransomed by Hamas, which is demanding the release of Palestinian prisoners in return.
5 September 2014	Eston Kohver		Estonia	43	Released	Officer of the Estonian Internal Security Service accused by Russian forces of espionage, convicted, and sentenced to 15 years' imprisonment. His conviction was considered unlawful by other countries, and Kohver was eventually released in a prisoner exchange on 26 September 2015.
18 October 2014	Donna Eastwood	Joshua Caird	Dartford, England	26	Murdered	Englishwoman kidnapped by her neighbor after attending a friend's birthday party. Her burned remains were found on the same day. Caird was arrested, convicted and sentenced to life imprisonment.
25 October 2014	Kenji Goto	Islamic State	Syria	47	Murdered	Journalist kidnapped by Islamic State while attempting to rescue another hostage. The following year, the IS cell known as "The Beatles" released a video in which Goto was beheaded by Mohammed Emwazi.

== 2015 ==
Date	Victim	Abductor	Location	Age of victim	Outcome	Notes
15 January 2015	Alexander Hurley	Jonathan Dowdall	Dublin, Ireland	unknown	Released	Hurley was kidnapped and later released.
21 January 2015	Noela Rukundo	Unidentified kidnappers	Bujumbura, Burundi	unknown	Released	Burundian-Australian woman kidnapped on the orders of her husband, Balenga Kalala, who ordered that she be killed. Her kidnappers refused to do so and instead released her, allowing Rukundo to return to Australia and confront her husband while he conducted her supposed funeral. He was later convicted for the crime and sentenced to 9 years' imprisonment.
24 January 2015	Armel Sayo	Unidentified kidnappers	Bangui, Central African Republic	35	Released	On 24 January 2015, Armel Sayo was kidnapped and released on 11 February 2015.
23 March 2015	Denise Huskins	Matthew Muller	Vallejo, California	30	Released	Known as "The Gone Girl Kidnapping", in reference to the popular suspense/thriller novel of the same name by Gillian Flynn. Aaron Quinn and Denise Huskins were stalked by disbarred Harvard University attorney Matthew Muller with a camera on a drone. Muller broke in wearing a wetsuit and wielding a water pistol, tied up the couple and blindfolded them with goggles. Denise was abducted and raped twice by Muller, which was recorded on camera, and a ransom of $8,500 was demanded for her release. She was found days later in her home town of Huntington Beach, California, withholding the rape for fear Muller would kill her and Aaron. Muller sent evidence of the crimes to a newspaper, but alleged organized criminals were responsible to misdirect the investigation. Police believed the crimes to be a hoax by the couple, even suspecting Aaron killed Denise until she turned up alive, until Muller was arrested for a home invasion with similar burglary patterns and home surveillance equipment. Muller pleaded guilty to federal kidnapping charges, then was institutionalized and prescribed antipsychotics while waiting to be found competent to stand trial for further charges. Muller was later tried for rape in 2019. The case was the subject of a documentary American Nightmare.
15 April 2015	Chloé Ansel	Zbigniew Huminski	Calais, France	9	Murdered	Ansel was kidnapped near her home in Calais, and her body found only hours later, showing obvious signs of sexual assault and strangulation. That same day, Polish national Zbigniew Huminski was arrested and confessed to the crime while intoxicated, but would never be brought to trial for the case, as he hanged himself in his jail cell a month later.
26 July 2015	Madyson Middleton	Adrian Gonzalez	Santa Cruz, California, U.S.	8	Murdered	Madyson "Maddy" Middleton, an 8-year-old girl about to enter the fourth grade at a Santa Cruz elementary school, was kidnapped in the Tannery Arts Center apartment complex by Gonzalez, a 15-year-old high schooler and acquaintance. She was apparently lured to the apartment by the teen, who then abducted, sexually assaulted and attempted to strangle her. He placed her in a garbage can and stabbed her after it became apparent she survived, and the coroner's report indicated that she died of asphyxiation. Gonzalez was nearby when Maddy's body was found in a recycling bin and cameras recorded him placing her there. He was quickly arrested and charged with the crimes, and he soon confessed to Maddy's abduction, rape, and murder. As of the summer of 2020, the case fac a number of legal proceedings due to Gonzalez's age. California's Proposition 57 gives a presiding judge discretion over whether to try a juvenile as an adult, but other laws in the state impose statutory restrictions on such actions, and the legal course of the trial remains unclear.
12 September 2015	Seya Sadewmi	Saman Jayalath	Kotadeniyawa, Sri Lanka	4	Murdered	Sri Lankan child abducted, raped and murdered near her home. Her naked body was found in a canal the next day. Several men were erroneously arrested, before the actual killer was connected to the crime via DNA evidence. Saman Jayalath was convicted and sentenced to death.
21 September 2015	Olu Falae	unknown	Akure, Nigeria	77	Released	Nigerian banker, administrator and politician kidnapped by unknown men on his 77th birthday, who held him for 100-million-naira ransom. After payment of the ransom, he was released and returned home.
October 2015	Shukria Tabassum	Unknown (Islamic State affiliated)	Ghazni, Afghanistan	9	Killed	Seven people were killed on 9 November 2015 in the southern Afghan province of Zabul after about a month as hostages. Their remains were later discovered by the Taliban.
October 2015	Gul Pari	Unknown (Islamic State affiliated)	Ghazni, Afghanistan	45	Killed	Seven people were killed on 9 November 2015 in the southern Afghan province of Zabul after about a month as hostages. Their remains were later discovered by the Taliban.
October 2015	Sardaro Ali	Unknown (Islamic State affiliated)	Ghazni, Afghanistan	Unknown	Killed	Seven people were killed on 9 November 2015 in the southern Afghan province of Zabul after about a month as hostages. Their remains were later discovered by the Taliban.
October 2015	Shaukat Ali	Unknown (Islamic State affiliated)	Ghazni, Afghanistan	16	Killed	Seven people were killed on 9 November 2015 in the southern Afghan province of Zabul after about a month as hostages. Their remains were later discovered by the Taliban.
October 2015	Sadiq Ali	Unknown (Islamic State affiliated)	Ghazni, Afghanistan	18	Killed	Seven people were killed on 9 November 2015 in the southern Afghan province of Zabul after about a month as hostages. Their remains were later discovered by the Taliban.
October 2015	Mohammad Khan	Unknown (Islamic State affiliated)	Ghazni, Afghanistan	28	Killed	Seven people were killed on 9 November 2015 in the southern Afghan province of Zabul after about a month as hostages. Their remains were later discovered by the Taliban.

== 2016 ==
Date	Victim	Abductor	Location	Age of victim	Outcome	Notes
20 March 2016	Kasper Sokol	'Wasserstrasse' organization, self-proclaimed Swiss human rights activists	Basel, Switzerland, Wasserstrasse 21	6	Rescued	Natalia Sokol and her children Kasper, Mama, and Troïtsa were violently kidnapped by a group of 10 to 15 so-called Swiss human rights activists at Wasserstrasse, 21 in Basel, Switzerland on 20 March 2016. The kidnappers in motorcycle helmets, armed with wooden sticks and shields, broke down the door to the Voina family apartment and attacked the family with tear gas. After several minutes of pleading by the father, Oleg Vorotnikov, to not use violence, some five people overcame him, beat him up, and tied him up with duct tape, leaving him incapacitated, after which another group abducted Natalia and the three children. At the time, the children were taking a bath and the perpetrators kidnapped them naked.
20 March 2016	Mama Sokol	'Wasserstrasse' organization, self-proclaimed Swiss human rights activists	Basel, Switzerland, Wasserstrasse 21	4	Rescued	
20 March 2016	Troïtsa Sokol	'Wasserstrasse' organization, self-proclaimed Swiss human rights activists	Basel, Switzerland, Wasserstrasse 21	10 months	Rescued	
3 April 2016	Nazanin Zaghari-Ratcliffe	Iranian government	Imam Khomeini International Airport, Iran	38	Released	Iranian-British journalist convicted on charges of "plotting against the government". Released on 16 March 2022 after six years of detention in Iran. Her release was linked to the unfulfilled arms deal in the 1970s. Zaghari-Ratcliffe returned to the UK the day after her release.
5 April 2016	Arianna Fitts	unknown	Oakland, California	2	Missing	Two-year-old Arianna and her mother Nicole were reported missing on 5 April 2016. Nicole's body was found on 8 April. No trace of Arianna has ever been found.
20 June 2016	Alayna Ertl	Zachary Todd Anderson	Watkins, Minnesota, U.S.	5	Murdered	Ertl was abducted and her body was located nine hours later in a wilderness park.
16 July 2016	Patrick James Almodovar	Abu Sayyaf	Sulu, Philippines	18	Murdered	Almodovar was abducted by Abu Sayyaf militants, who gave a ransom of P1,000,000. Almodovar's family was able to produce P100,000, but this was not enough. On 24 August 2016 they released a video of them beheading Almodovar in Indanan. They then dumped a plastic bag containing his head in Barangay Kajatian.
5 August 2016	Denise Winchester	Brian Winchester	Leon County, Florida, U.S.	46	Released	Denise Winchester was abducted at gunpoint by her estranged husband Brian after filing for divorce. Brian hid in the back of Denise's car before holding her at gunpoint and against her will for about an hour until she persuaded him to release her. While imprisoned for the crime, Brian confessed to murdering Denise's first husband Mike Williams at Denise's behest and agreed to testify against Denise in return for leniency in the kidnapping case.
10 August 2016	Philip Finnegan	Stephen Pentose	Dublin, Ireland	24	Murdered	Finnegan was an Irishman abducted from his home, and brought to Rahin Woods in County Kildare and subsequently murdered.
31 August 2016	Kala Brown	Todd Kohlhepp	Spartanburg, South Carolina, U.S.	30	Rescued	Brown and her boyfriend Charles Carver were visiting a property belonging to serial killer Todd Kohlhepp to remove brush when they argued with Kohlhepp, who murdered Carver and took Brown prisoner. Brown was kept chained up in a storage container on Kohlhepp's property, repeatedly raped and shown the bodies of Kohlhepp's previous victims to intimidate her until she was found by law enforcement on 3 November during a search of Kohlhepp's property.
15 September 2016	Kiana Sādāt-Hosseini	Aunt's husband	Nishapur, Iran	7	Murdered	Kiana Sādāt-Hosseini was a female child who was in pre-school who was kidnapped and murdered on 15 September 2016 by her aunt's husband who was later convicted for his crime.
29 September 2016	Insiya Hemani	Father Shehzad Hemani and accomplices	Amsterdam, Netherlands	2	Detained	Insiya Hemani is a two-year-old Dutch girl that was abducted from Amsterdam to India on 29 September 2016. Her father, Shehzad Hemani, arranged the abduction with the assistance of several accomplices.
6 October 2016	Kim Kardashian	Five unknown men	Paris, France	36	Released	While attending Paris Fashion Week, Kardashian was supposedly robbed by five unknown individuals, who held her at gunpoint in her Paris apartment. The men fled, and she later managed to free herself. The incident was met with skepticism by media outlets, who suggested it could have been staged, prompting Kardashian to file a lawsuit which was ultimately dropped.
8 October 2016	Belarmino da Ascenção Marta	Jorge Luiz Talarico, José Hilton dos Santos and Ronaldo Paulino	Louveira, Brazil	80	Released	Belarmino was kidnapped by three of his security guards, which asked for a ransom of R$ 20 million. During captivity, he was threatened with a chainsaw. He was rescued on 7 November by the Civil Police of São Paulo.
18 October 2016	Jee Ick-Joo	Filipino police officers	Angeles City, Philippines		Murdered	Jee Ick-Joo, a South Korean businessman, was abducted and held for ransom by officers of the Philippine National Police under the pretext of detaining him for his alleged involvement in the drugs trade. He was strangled to death within the boundaries of Camp Crame, and his body was later located in a mortuary in Caloocan. A court convicted three of the eight officers suspected, including the apparent ringleader.
11 November 2016	Phạm Minh Tuấn	Abu Sayyaf	Off the coast of Basilan Island, Philippines	Unknown	Rescued	Abu Sayyaf members hijacked the Royal 16 a cargo ship off the coast of Basilan Island, at the time there were 19 crew members. The militants took six of the passengers including the ships captain Phạm Minh Tuấn, and released the remaining 13 one of which were injured after being shot in the hand. The pirates then took them to Basilan Island, the militants then made a ransom of 25 million pesos and set a deadline for 30 June 2017. On 22 June they released one of the hostages Hoàng Võ. After the ransom wasn't paid on the night of 4 July 2017 the militants took Hoàng Văn Hải and Hoàng Trung Thông and beheaded them, their bodies were discovered shortly the next day. The Philippine army rescued the remaining hostages in the days after.
11 November 2016	Đỗ Trung Hiếu	Abu Sayyaf	Off the coast of Basilan Island, Philippines	Unknown	Rescued	
11 November 2016	Trần Khương Dũng	Abu Sayyaf	Off the coast of Basilan Island, Philippines	Unknown	Rescued	
11 November 2016	Hoàng Võ	Abu Sayyaf	Off the coast of Basilan Island, Philippines	Unknown	Released	
11 November 2016	Hoàng Văn Hải	Abu Sayyaf	Off the coast of Basilan Island, Philippines	25	Murdered	
11 November 2016	Hoàng Trung Thông	Abu Sayyaf	Off the coast of Basilan Island, Philippines	Unknown	Murdered	
17 December 2016	Carlos Andrés García	SEBIN agents	Guasdualito, Venezuela	43–44	Died in custody	Venezuelan politician who was detained on charges of theft, arson and inciting public unrest, but is widely believed to have been arrested for political motives. García suffered from a stroke and later died while still being held in detention, with the circumstances surrounding the case being strongly condemned by other countries' governments.
20 December 2016	Noel Besconde	Abu Sayyaf	Celebes Sea	Unknown	Murdered	Abu Sayyaf militants boarded a F/B Ramona 2 fishing vessel operated by vessel's captain Noel Besconde and three other Filipinos, the militants then abducted all four and took them to Jolo Island. On 13 April 2017 Noel Besconde was beheaded in Patikul after he had become sick and started delaying movements. A video of the beheading was also released.
20 December 2016	3 unnamed Filipino fishermen	Abu Sayyaf	Celebes Sea	Unknown	Unknown	Abu Sayyaf militants boarded a F/B Ramona 2 fishing vessel operated by vessel's captain Noel Besconde and three other Filipinos, the militants then abducted all four and took them to Jolo Island. On 13 April 2017 Noel Besconde was beheaded in Patikul after he had become sick and started delaying movements. A video of the beheading was also released.
31 December 2016	Unnamed 18-year-old	Jordan Hill, Tesfaye Cooper, Brittany Covington, Tanisha Covington	Chicago, Illinois, U.S.	18	Rescued	The victim, a mentally disabled white 18-year-old, was subjected to a racially motivated attack by four African-Americans led by Jordan Hill, who picked him up on 31 December and kept him in his van for three days before driving him to the Covington's apartment, where he was tied up, beaten, humiliated and cut with knives for around an hour. The victim was rescued when police officer Michael Donnelly encountered him being led along the sidewalk by Hill.

== 2017 ==
Date	Victim	Abductor	Location	Age of victim	Outcome	Notes
8 February 2017	Reagan Tokes	Brian Golsby	Grove City, Ohio	21	Murdered	Reagan Tokes was an American university student who was kidnapped on 8 February 2017 and found dead the next day.
21 May 2017	Thabang Makwetla	Brandon Mashigo, Mojalefa Mathe, Motsepe Gidion and Ben Kutumela	Johannesburg, South Africa	59	Released	Politician and member of the African National Congress who was abducted by four armed men and threatened to hand over his personal belongings. After withdrawing money from his bank account, Makwetla was released unharmed. The incident caused a stir among the country's prominent politicians, and the four offenders were eventually apprehended and awaiting trial for the case.
23 May 2017	Chito Soganub	Maute group militants	Marawi, Philippines	57	Rescued	Roman Catholic priest kidnapped along with 23 others by militants during the Battle of Marawi, during which he appeared in propaganda videos and was forced to convert to Islam. He and a teacher from Dansalan College escaped captivity on 17 September, and were located and rescued by military officers shortly after.
24 May 2017	Li Xinheng	Islamic State – Khorasan Province	Quetta, Pakistan	24	Murdered	Two Chinese Christian missionaries, who were teaching Mandarin in Quetta were attacked and abducted by three Islamic State members while on their lunch break. 15 days later shortly after recent Pakistani military operations in Balochistan, the abductors released a video showing militants slitting the couples throats.
24 May 2017	Meng Lisi	Islamic State – Khorasan Province	Quetta, Pakistan	26	Murdered	Two Chinese Christian missionaries, who were teaching Mandarin in Quetta were attacked and abducted by three Islamic State members while on their lunch break. 15 days later shortly after recent Pakistani military operations in Balochistan, the abductors released a video showing militants slitting the couples throats.
9 June 2017	Yingying Zhang	Brendt Christensen	Urbana, Illinois, U.S.	26	Murdered	On 9 June 2017, Zhang was running late for an appointment to sign a lease. While waiting at a bus stop, she was approached by Christensen in his car. Zhang got into the car and has not been heard from since. On 24 June 2019, Christensen was convicted of the murder of Yingying Zhang. Her body has not been found.
May 2017	Muhammad Abdullah al-Ismail	Wagner Group	Palmyra, Syria	30-31	Murdered	Muhammad Abdullah al-Ismail, a Syrian soldier, who fled to Lebanon and returned to Syria in 2017, he was arrested shortly after his arrival and was forcibly conscripted into the Syrian Army. A few months later in either June or May he attempted to desert, but was recaptured by Wagner PMCs, who claimed he was a jihadist and a member of ISIL. They then filmed themselves detonating a grenade on his waist then shooting him in the stomach and bludgeoning him to death with sledge hammers, then severing his hands and head, and burning his body. They posted the first video in July 2017 and the second in 2019. The videos led to the identification of seven members of Wagner.
May 2017	Karabo Mokoena	Sandile Mantsoe	Johannesburg, South Africa	22	Murdered	A young woman was kidnapped and murdered by her boyfriend.

== 2018 ==
Date	Victim	Abductor	Location	Age of victim	Outcome	Notes
28 January 2018	Rachael Anderson	Anthony Pardon	Columbus, Ohio, U.S.	24	Murdered	American aspiring funeral director who was held in her own house by repeat sexual offender Anthony Pardon, who tortured, raped and ultimately strangled her. Her body was found the next day, and Pardon was soon arrested, convicted and sentenced to life imprisonment.
February 2018	Moataz Wadnan	Egyptian government	Egypt	unknown	Detained	Journalist for HuffPost Arabi who was arrested and is currently in state custody for interviewing Hisham Genena, a politician who claimed to possess documents revealing that government officials were behind the Egyptian revolution of 2011. He is currently imprisoned in the Tora Prison.
1 March 2018	Ezzat Ghoniem	Egyptian government	Egypt	unknown	Detained	Lawyer and human rights activist arrested and kept in detention for an alleged "human rights terrorism" plot to overthrow the government. He is currently held in the Tora Prison.
19 May 2018	Jastine Valdez	Mark Hennessy	Bray, County Wicklow, Ireland	24	Murdered	While walking home, Jastine Valdez was kidnapped by a man who forced her into his SUV. She was found dead two days later, strangled to death. Her killer, Mark Hennessy, was shot dead by a police officer after a 24-hour manhunt.
2 July 2018	Alesha MacPhail	Aaron Campbell	Isle of Bute, Scotland	6	Murdered	Abducted from her grandparents' house by an English-born teenager, who subsequently raped and murdered her. Her body was found two hours after her abduction, and the killer, Aaron Campbell, was arrested three days later. He was convicted and sentenced to life imprisonment.
18 July 2018	Mollie Tibbetts	Cristhian Bahena Rivera	Brooklyn, Iowa, U.S.	20	Murdered	Tibbetts was kidnapped by Rivera, an undocumented immigrant, while out jogging on the evening of 18 July and stabbed to death. Rivera later confessed to the crime and pointed police to a cornfield in Poweshiek County, where Tibbetts' body was found.
2 August 2018	Jinjing Ma	Parents	New York City	12	Located	Ma was a 12-year-old Chinese schoolgirl reported missing from Ronald Reagan Washington National Airport on 2 August 2018. She was located the following day in the company of her parents—U.S. citizens—in the borough of Queens.
15 August 2018	Norma Azucena Rodríguez Zamora	Unknown masked gunmen	Hidalgo	Unknown	Escaped	Norma Azucena Rodríguez Zamora is a female politician from Mexico and belongs to a party called the Party of the Democratic Revolution who was kidnapped by gunmen while she was driving along a highway. She managed to escape as the next day as it was reported the next day by a local newspaper.
15 October 2018	Jayme Closs	Jake Patterson	Barron, Wisconsin, U.S.	13	Escaped	Police responding to a 911 call from Closs's home found her parents shot to death. Closs was missing, and on 10 January 2019 she sought the help of neighbors near the house where she was allegedly held. A man has been charged with kidnapping her and the murders of her parents.
5 November 2018	Hania Noelia Aguilar	Michael McLellan	Lumberton, North Carolina, U.S.	13	Murdered	On 5 November 2018, 13-year-old Hania Aguilar was abducted from a mobile home park while waiting for a ride to the bus stop. A witness saw a man in black and a yellow bandanna approach her and force her into the car that she had gone to start. The stolen vehicle was located three days later. Her body was found on 27 November 2018. The Lumberton Police Department with the assistance of the FBI arrested Michael McLellan, who was charged with ten felonies related to Hania's abduction. McLellan's DNA was found in the stolen vehicle and tied to the abduction.

== 2019 ==
Date	Victim	Abductor	Location	Age of victim	Outcome	Notes
January 2019	Trương Duy Nhất	Unknown	Thailand	Unknown	Detained	A Vietnamese journalist and activist was kidnapped and handed over to authorities.
29 March 2019	Samantha Josephson	Nathaniel Rowland	Columbia, South Carolina, U.S.	21	Murdered	Josephson, a senior college student went drinking with friends, and mistakenly entered Rowland's car after believing he was her Uber driver. Her body was found 14 hours later, with numerous stab wounds. Rowland was later convicted and sentenced to life imprisonment, and the case served as a pillar for the passing of Sami's Law in her home state of New Jersey.
27 April 2019	John Fru Ndi	Ambazonian separatists	Bui, Cameroon	77	Released	The founder of Cameroon's the Social Democratic Front, Fru Ndi was abducted in Bui, Cameroon by Ambazonian separatists; he was released unharmed after seven hours of captivity.
18 May 2019	Salem Sabatka	Michael Webb	Fort Worth, Texas, U.S.	8	Rescued	Sabatka was abducted as she walked with her mother in Fort Worth, Texas, on 18 May 2019. Her abductor was 51-year-old Michael Webb. The child was rescued the following day. Her abductor was sentenced to life imprisonment in November 2019.
28 June 2019	John Fru Ndi	Ambazonian separatists	Bamenda, Cameroon	77	Released	The second of two incidents involving Fru Ndi's kidnapping in 2019. On this occasion, Fru Ndi was beaten inside his home, then dragged out of his home, forced into a van and driven to an unknown location. On this occasion, Fru Ndi was held captive for over 24 hours before being released.
13 July 2019	Paislee Shultis	Kimberly Cooper, Kirk Shultis Jr. and Kirk Shultiss Sr.	New York, U.S.	4	Rescued	A four-year-old child kidnapped in 2019 by her biological parents, Kimberly Cooper and Kirk Shultis Jr. (who did not have custody of the child). Shultis was rescued, unharmed, on 14 February. Her parents, along with Kirk Shultiss Sr. face charges including custodial interference and endangering the welfare of a child.
23 July 2019	Nathalie Birli	Unidentified (the kidnapper was arrested, but his name has never been released)	Graz	27	Released	Austrian triathlete Nathalie Birli was abducted by a knife-wielding man who attacked her while she was riding her bike. The abductor took her back to his home and tried to drown her, but she managed to talk him into releasing her. The man was arrested later that day.
16 September 2019	Dulce Maria Alavez	Unknown	Bridgeton, New Jersey	5	Unknown	On 16 September 2019, 5-year-old Dulce Alavez went missing from Bridgeton City Park. Her mother, 19-year-old Noema Alavez Perez, reported that she was in her car at the park when she could not see Alavez and her 3-year-old brother playing at a nearby playground. She went to investigate, only to discover her daughter had vanished. An Amber alert was issued and a $52,000 reward remains unclaimed.
6 October 2019	Daphne Westbrook	John Westbrook	Chattanooga, Tennessee	16	Found safe	A Chattanooga teenager abducted by her father at age 16 in Obtober 2019. The teen was discovered safe and well at age 18 in May 2021. Westbrook informed authorities she was safe and not being held against her will.
13 November 2019	Idris Khattak	Four unknown individuals	Khyber Pakhtunkhwa, Pakistan	unknown	Detained	Human rights activist who was detained and is currently scheduled to stand before a military trial for alleged espionage. His arrest is considered political in nature.
30 November 2019	Dua Mangi	Four to five unknown individuals	Karachi, Pakistan	22	Released	While walking back from getting food, she was abducted by gunpoint and drawn into a vehicle. The male friend with her was shot while trying to help her. Her abduction was publicized on social media and many alleged that it was her fault she was abducted.
