= Trials and judicial hearings following the Egyptian revolution of 2011 =

The trials and judicial hearings following the 2011 Egyptian Revolution were a series of legal moves to establish accountability regarding the actions of various Egyptian government officials and prominent businessmen.

A series of arrests and travel bans was imposed on high-profile figures following the ouster of the former president Hosni Mubarak's regime. The actions were based on several charges: causing the death of as many as 800 demonstrators; the injury of around 5,000 demonstrators; as well as embezzlement, profiteering, money laundering and human rights abuses. Notable figures arrested included Mubarak, his wife Suzanne, their sons Gamal and Alaa, former Interior Minister Habib el-Adly, former Housing Minister Ahmed El Maghrabi, former Tourism Minister Zoheir Garana, and the former secretary of the National Democratic Party for Organisational Affairs Ahmed Ezz. Arrest warrants were also issued for some public figures who had already left the country during the start of the revolution, mostly on charges of financial misappropriations. These included the former minister of trade and industry, Rachid Mohamed Rachid, and Hussein Salem, a business tycoon.

Mubarak's ousting was followed by widespread allegations of corruption against numerous other government officials and senior politicians. These included the former speaker of the Egyptian Parliament, Fathi Sorour, and the former speaker of the higher legislative body (Shura Council), Safwat El Sherif. Trials of the accused officials started on March 5, 2011, when the former interior minister of Egypt, Habib el-Adly, appeared before the Giza Criminal Court in Cairo. The trials of el-Adly and other public figures are expected to take a long time.

== Background to the trials ==
=== Allegations of corruption ===
Political corruption in the Mubarak administration's Interior Ministry had risen dramatically due to the increased power over the institutional system necessary to prolong the presidency. The rise to power of prominent businessmen in the ruling National Democratic Party (NDP), in the government, and in the People's Assembly (Egyptian Parliament) led to waves of anger during the tenure of Prime Minister's Ahmed Nazif's government. An example is Ahmed Ezz's monopolization of the Egyptian steel industry by holding more than 60 percent of the market share. American professor Alaadin Elaasar, a noted Egyptian biographer, estimates that the Mubarak family is worth somewhere between $50 and $70 billion. Within days of Mubarak's ouster, Gawdat al-Malt, head of the Central Auditing Organisation (CAO, public finance watchdog) during the last decade of Mubarak's rule stated that he had sent Mubarak, his cabinet, and parliament 1000 reports between 2004 and 2010 recording various infractions by the Nazif cabinet including embezzlement of public funds, misuse of state-owned land, and ignoring the public procurement law.

The perceptions of corruption, and its beneficiaries, being limited to businessmen with ties to the NDP had created a picture "where wealth fuels political power and political power buys wealth."

- The wealth of Ahmed Ezz, the former NDP Organisation Secretary, is estimated to be E£18 billion.
- The wealth of former Housing Minister, Ahmed el-Maghraby, is estimated to be more than E£11 billion.
- The wealth of former Minister of Tourism Zuhair Garrana is estimated to be E£13 billion.
- The wealth of former Minister of Trade and Industry, Rashid Mohamed Rashid, is estimated to be E£12 billion;
- The wealth of former Interior Minister Habib el-Adly is estimated to be E£8 billion.

During the 2010 Egyptian parliamentary election opposition groups complained of harassment and fraud perpetrated by the government. As a result, opposition and civil society activists called for election reforms with changes to a number of legal and constitutional provisions.

In 2010 the Transparency International's Corruption Perceptions Index report assessed Egypt with a CPI score of 3.1 (with 10 being clean and 0 being totally corrupt), based on perceptions of the degree of corruption from business people and country analysts.

=== Allegations of human rights abuses ===
On March 5–6, 2011, numerous Egyptian State Security buildings were stormed by demonstrators after eyewitnesses reported that officials were shredding and burning documents which could potentially serve as evidence against government officials. Fires were simultaneously witnessed in a number of Egyptian State Security offices, including the Cairo Downtown office (Lazoghly), the 6 October city office, and offices in Damanhour, Nasr City, Marsa Matrouh and Alexandria. Large amounts of shredded and burnt documents were found in these state security buildings. The demonstrators reportedly found evidence to support the widely accepted allegation of human rights abuses by Egyptian State Security. Egyptian newspaper Al-Ahram reported that the Damanhour office was perhaps the most panic provoking, as prison cells with electrocution equipment were found in close proximity to a secret graveyard.

== Cases pertaining to public events ==
=== Public disorder ===
Numerous incidents of public disorder occurred from the start of the uprising. On January 28 the police withdrew from the streets of Egypt following break-ins to a number of prisons. Prison guards allegedly allowed and aided the escape of inmates. On February 2, a day that was dubbed the "Battle of the Camel", pro-government activists on camel- and horse-back stormed Tahrir Square in Downtown Cairo, where anti-regime demonstrators had set up camp, attacking them with Molotov cocktails, stones, chipped marble, swords and other weapons. This confrontation resulted in the deaths of 91 demonstrators and the injury of several hundreds. The government appointed a fact-finding panel to investigate the cause of these incidents, headed by judge Adel Koura.

The prosecution reported that, upon examining the sites where demonstrators were shot at, empty bullet-casings were found on the rooftops of buildings surrounding Tahrir Square, including the American University of Cairo (AUC). The AUC was closed at that time and it is believed that armed officers and regime loyalists had stormed the buildings and shot at the demonstrators. A similar scenario was reported in the area surrounding the Ministry of Interior in Cairo, where demonstrators were shot at from its roof. On March 10 Ismail el-Shaer, the former security chief of Cairo, was interviewed by prosecutors regarding these incidents. This was followed by the arrest of former Egyptian deputy interior minister Adly Fayed, chief of state security Hassan Abdulrahman, and chief of central security Ahmed Ramzy. All three were placed in custody for 15 days beginning on March 11.

Interrogation started the next day. Al-Ahram reported that a CD containing recordings of telephone conversations between Habib el-Adly and Ahmed Ramzy was examined as evidence. Al-Ahram also stated that Ramzy received orders from el-Adly to use live ammunition against anti-regime demonstrators. Ramzy denied this, but admitted that he ordered the use of rubber bullets and tear gas. He also stated that el-Adly ordered the withdrawal of the whole police force from the streets on the evening of January 28 only after the Egyptian military assumed responsibility. Ramzy claimed that this decision was made to avoid further confrontation between the police and the public. His account was supported by statements from Adly Fayed.

Ismail El-Shaer was also investigated for allegations of ordering the use of weapons against demonstrators and for causing public disorder, which he denied. He was also accused of being the driver in the widely publicized "van incident", in which a police van intentionally rammed into a large group of demonstrators. El-Shaer denied that as well and stated that he was in his office at the time of the incident.

On the day following the arrest and initial interrogation of el-Shaer, Ramzy, Fayed and Abdulrahman it was announced that the fact-finding panel headed by Judge Adel Koura has submitted four reports to the Egyptian prosecutor-general. Koura refused to name any officials who might have been legally charged with causing the death of protesters, but stated that the police force is not permitted to use live ammunition without authorization from the interior minister, whose decision must be approved by the country's political leadership.

The events of February 2 also led to allegations that members of the NDP funded and coordinated the activities of the regime loyalists who attacked demonstrators in Tahrir. The investigations of the fact-finding panel confirmed that two MPs from the NDP were involved. Both were named by Al-Ahram as Youssef Khatab and Abdulnasser el-Gabri and they were arrested on March 10.

On March 21 the fact finding panel submitted its final report to the military council in charge of Egypt. Al-Ahram reported some of the findings from this report, including that 685 demonstrators were killed and approximately 5,000 were injured during the aforementioned events - 1,200 with eye injuries and many with head injuries, indicating that regime forces assaulted them with intent to kill. The report named a number of political figures, businessmen, and police officers as suspects in those incidents.

== Cases pertaining to individuals ==
=== Mubarak family ===
On February 28, 2011, Egyptian Prosecutor General Abdel Magid Mahmud put a freeze on the assets of ousted president Hosni Mubarak and his family and imposed a travel ban on them. Subsequently, the Egyptian government asked the U.S. government and the European Union to freeze the assets of the Mubaraks whilst investigating the widespread allegations of profiteering by Mubarak, his wife Suzanne, and their sons Alaa and Gamal. On March 6 Mohamad Hamouda, Mubarak's lawyer during his presidency, stated that he agreed to represent Mubarak on certain conditions, including that the Mubarak family inform him of their exact assets. Hamouda also stated that Mubarak will take legal action against The Guardian and The New York Times for defamation. On the following day Hamouda withdrew from legal representation for the Mubaraks citing his "discomfort" with the case. Hamouda stated that achieving justice in this case will be difficult and explained that he was given only three days to review evidentiary documents and, two days into this period, he had not yet received these documents from the prosecutor. Hamouda stated that another lawyer, Mourtada Mansour, would represent the Mubaraks. Cairo criminal court was scheduled to start proceedings in this case on March 8, 2011. On that day neither Mubarak nor his council appeared in court. The court reaffirmed the travel ban on the Mubarak family and upheld the decision by the prosecutor to freeze the Mubaraks' accounts, citing that there is sufficient evidence to suspect Mubarak and his family of profiteering and misappropriation of public funds. The Mubaraks were contesting the travel ban in appeals court, while a criminal court was to convene to consider the financial charges.

The general prosecutor, Abdel Magid Mahmud, ordered the financial assets inside Egypt of Mubarak and his family members to be frozen, Al Jazeera reported. On March 17, 2011, Senator John Kerry, head of the United States Senate Committee on Foreign Relations, officially confirmed the U.S. government had frozen assets worth $31 billion belonging to Mubarak, including property and bank accounts.

On April 13 the general prosecutor ordered the arrest of former Egyptian President Hosni Mubarak and his sons, Alaa and Gamal, for 15 days as part of an inquiry into the use of force and violence against pro-democracy demonstrators, and the charges of corruption.

On May 28, a Cairo administrative court found Mubarak guilty of damaging the national economy during the protests by shutting down the Internet and telephone services. He was fined E£200 million ( approximately US$33.6 million ), which the court ordered to be payable from his personal assets.

On June 1, it was announced by the ruling Supreme Military Council of Egypt that Mubarak was due to stand trial on August 3. On July 25, it was decided that the former Interior Minister Habib Al Adly would be put on trial for charges of human rights violations and premeditated murder of protesters during the January 25 Revolution alongside Mubarak and his sons, Alaa and Gamal. There was considerable speculation regarding the issue of whether Mubarak would really stand trial, given the contradictory and controversial reports of his medical status and the perceived prejudice of the ruling Military Council in attempting to prevent Mubarak's trial. However, on August 3, 2011, Mubarak and his sons along with Habib Al Adly did stand trial in the Cairo Police Academy. Mubarak was transported from his hospital at Sharm el Sheikh to Cairo in the early hours of that day on a military aircraft. Egypt awoke in much tension and anticipation at the trial. Clashes were witnessed between pro-Mubarak and anti-Mubarak protesters outside the Police Academy, which were promptly dispersed by the Egyptian police forces. A heavy and concentrated military and security presence was deployed at the trial location, with up to 5,000 troops and 500 tanks. Mubarak was placed along with all the defendants in the trial, which included Adly, Mubarak's sons Gamal and Alaa, as well as 6 top aides and associates of Al Adly, in an iron cage as the court proceedings opened. The first day of the trial witnessed an enunciation of the indictment of Mubarak, the accusations and allegations and legal charges directed against him by the Prosecution, which accused him of money laundering, illegally profiting from the sale of natural gas to Israel below international market rates, as well as charges of misappropriation of public funds, sale of state property, and corruption. The Prosecution also asserted that Mubarak had issued instructions to security forces to open fire on demonstrators, which had killed 846 people in the 2011 Egyptian Revolution. Mubarak's lawyer Farid al Deeb countered with outlining his 7 demands, chief among which was his insistence that Mubarak's trial would be separated from Al Adly's, as well as arguing for legal action to be undertaken against Muhammad Hussein Tantawi, the current chairman of the ruling Supreme Military Council, alleging his shared responsibility in Mubarak's crimes. Mubarak and the other defendants were allowed to give their statements in response to the accusations filed against them from the Prosecution, to which all of them replied unequivocally that they categorically denied the charges and accusations directed against them, instead claiming they were innocent. The trial concluded with the decision that judicial proceedings would be adjourned to August 15.

In September, 2011, police officer Mohamed Abdel-Hakim became the fifth witness to change the testimony he had given in secret before the prosecution when giving his first testimony in court. "He said 24 soldiers from Central Security Forces used two guns to fire teargas at protesters and two starting pistols to help disperse them. He denied that they used live ammunition against protesters ... Al-Youm Al-Sabea report[ed]."

In January, 2012, prosecutor Moustafa Khater, one of a five-member prosecution team, "demanded on Thursday that the ousted Egyptian leader be sentenced to death by hanging on charges of complicity in the killing of protesters during last year's uprising against his rule [and] also asked the judge for the death sentence for Mubarak's security chief and four top police commanders being tried in the same case.

On June 2, 2012, Hosni Mubarak was sentenced to life imprisonment. He started serving his term on June 4, at Tora Prison near Cairo. He was acquitted on 2 March 2017 by Court of Cassation, Egypt's top appeals court. He was released on 24 March 2017.

=== Rachid Mohamed Rachid ===
Rachid Mohamed Rachid became Egypt's Minister of Foreign Trade and Industry in July 2004. On January 28, 2011, Mubarak dissolved his then cabinet to form the last cabinet before his ousting. It was reported that Rachid, who was in Dubai at the time of the revolution, was offered a ministerial position in Mubarak's last cabinet which he refused. Rachid became the first high-profile figure to be accused of financial irregularities when he was charged while Mubarak was still in office. The timing of the allegations of financial irregularities against Rachid raised some doubts as to whether these allegations were actually disseminated in response to Rachid's refusal to accept an office in Mubarak's last government, or to be scapegoated as the public call for an end to corruption was becoming louder.

=== Habib el-Adly ===
The trial of Habib el-Adly follows two streams of legal charges: the first pertains to profiteering activities, and the second pertains to allegations that el-Adly ordered the use of live ammunitions against the demonstrators, during the January 2011 protests in different Egyptian cities, and was responsible for the opening of different jails in Egypt during the protests in order to cause criminal unrest and justify the use of force. A fact-finding panel was formed to assess the responsibility for incidents of criminal unrest. On March 9 the Egyptian daily newspaper Almasry Alyoum reported that el-Adly's charges in this case may have been of a political rather than criminal nature; evidence made available to the fact-finding mission suggested that he might have acted on orders from former president Mubarak and not on his own accord.

El-Adly appeared before the Giza Criminal Court on March 5 where he was formally charged with profiteering and money laundering. These charges relate to allegations that el-Adly received a bribe of E£4.5 million to allow a contractor to carry out building work on behalf of the Egyptian ministry of interior. El-Adly pleaded not guilty and the court proceedings were adjourned to April 2, to allow el-Adly's council to review the evidence. This trial was described by Al-Ahram as the "Egyptian trial of the century." El-Adly's police department was widely feared by Egyptians and the allegations, that he was responsible for the widespread thuggery that occurred during and after the Egyptian protests from January 25 to February 12 by opening jails, led to large demonstrations in front of the Giza Courthouse calling for el-Adly's execution.

More details from the investigation of el-Adly were published on March 18 in the Dostur newspaper, which reported that el-Adly described his subordinates and the political leadership of Egypt of having used him as a scapegoat. He reportedly alleged that the decision to deal with the demonstrations was a joint decision involving the political leadership, including Mubarak, who called for ending the anti-regime demonstrations at any price.

=== Anas el-Fiqqi ===
Anas el-Fiqqi was the Minister of Youth and subsequently became the Minister of Information from February 2004 to February 2011. He was implicated in the harassment of journalists during the 2011 Egyptian revolution and for the closure of news channels such as Al Jazeera in Cairo. On February 12, the day after the president stepped down, he resigned and was reportedly placed under house arrest. El-Fiqqi was charged with financial irregularities and became subject to investigations. His detention was renewed for 15 days on March 9 for further investigation of reports that he misappropriated funds, used public funds to support the NDP and for personal purchases, and received a bribe to allocate the advertising rights from an Arab media festival to the nephew of Mubarak's office manager.

=== Ahmed el-Maghraby ===
In February 2011 El Maghrabi was accused of spending public money and seizing state land following a cabinet purge by then President Hosni Mubarak.

=== Zoheir Garana ===
On March 6 the Egyptian daily newspaper Alwafd reported that the Prosecutor General of Egypt referred Zoheir Garana, the tourism minister in Mubarak's regime, to a Cairo criminal court on suspicions of embezzlement and profiteering. Garana was accused of misusing public funds amounting to E£51 million. It is noteworthy that Garana was arrested and placed on remand more than a week before the court referral order was issued by the Prosecutor General. Garana has not formally been put on trial, but rather detained in Tora Prison on suspicions concerning the scapegoating of officials, differential or preferential justice. As with many of those charged in the aftermath of the Egyptian Revolution, Garana's decisions and actions were seen as compliant with the policies set by the government in which he served. The E£51 million Garana is accused of misusing refers to the sale of a five million square meter piece of land in Ein el-Sokhna. Mr. Garana sealed the deal in accordance to a presidential decree made on July 4, 2005, where the price was $1 per meter. It is claimed that Garana allotted pieces of land at a low price to a company he owns, "Royal".

== Concerns ==
=== Judiciary ===
On March 21 Alwafd reported that the possibility of a deal between the prosecution and some of those accused of embezzlement was explored. Alwafd stated that this option was explored after the prosecution was successful in striking a deal with some creditors and business borrowers to repay a total of E£13 billion in return for dropping legal charges. The situation, according to Alwafd, proved more complex as the offers made by the accused, in return for dropping the embezzlement charges, were seen as unrealistic.

=== Public opinion ===
Concerns were raised that the accused would not be treated fairly due to the overwhelming public opinion against them. In an interview with the Shabab Alahram newspaper a well-known Egyptian lawyer, Mohamed Hamoouda, stated that his decision to withdraw from Hosni Mubarak's council was triggered by his belief that justice will not be achieved in these cases (see above under Mubarak's case). On March 8 Hamouda argued that these cases should be deferred until a later stage to ensure better administration of justice.

=== Embezzlement vs. human rights abuse charges ===
The first wave of legal actions following Mubarak's resignation was dominated by charges of financial nature, including bribery, misappropriation of funds, profiteering, embezzlement and money laundering. This caused concerns, particularly in the case of Habib el-Adly whose public image was much more eroded by allegations of human rights abuses, yet only faced legal charges over financial matters during the first wave of legal action. On March 16 the families of some of the protesters killed by the police demonstrated in front of the office of the general prosecutor of Egypt for what they saw as exclusive focus on financial cases at the expense of human rights cases. Some of these families claimed that the legal files pertaining to their slain relatives were not yet received by the prosecution.

=== Allegations of concealment and disposal of evidentiary documents ===
On March 5–6 numerous Egyptian State Security buildings were stormed by demonstrators after reports that officials were witnessed shredding and burning documents that could serve as evidence against government officials. The fires, which occurred at several state security offices, were witnessed the day after the government of Ahmed Shafik, the last minister appointed by Mubarak, had resigned. Large amounts of shredded and burnt documents were found in the various state security buildings. The demonstrators reportedly found some documents, CDs, video and audiotape recordings pertaining to a number of recent events in Egypt, including the explosion in the Two Saints Church in Alexandria on December 31, 2010, in which the state security apparatus, under el-Adly, was allegedly involved. Documents pertaining to spying, blackmailing and torture activities were also found and handed over to the state prosecutor.

On March 6, 2011, it was reported that among the documents that were found in a readable condition in the Egyptian State Security buildings, was a file from the office of Hassan Abdulrahman. As the former deputy interior minister under Mubarak he gave instructions to various branches of Egyptian State Security buildings to shred archived documents. These documents were believed to contain relevant information to the widespread allegations of human rights abuses by the Egyptian State Security. In an interview with BBC Arabic TV on March 7 General F. Allam, previous deputy director of the Egyptian State Security, stated that the burning of these documents will not impact on the evidence required for any court case - as copies of all these documents are automatically archived in confidential locations. General Allam argued that an order might have indeed been issued to shred or burn the documents due to fears that they may fall "in the wrong hands" if state security buildings were stormed by demonstrators. The same day of the interview 47 officers from the Egyptian State Security were arrested on suspicions of involvement in damaging these documents.
