= Hisham Genena =

Former judge and anti-corruption advocate

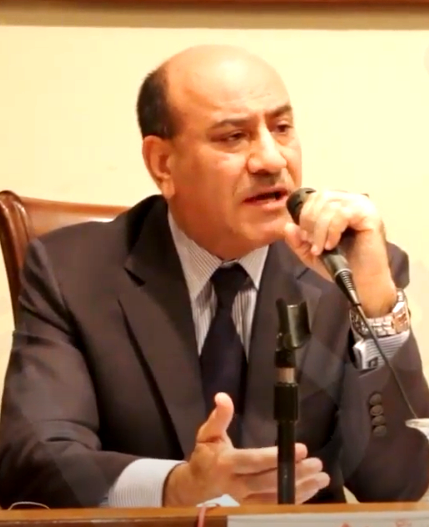
Hisham Genena (2015)

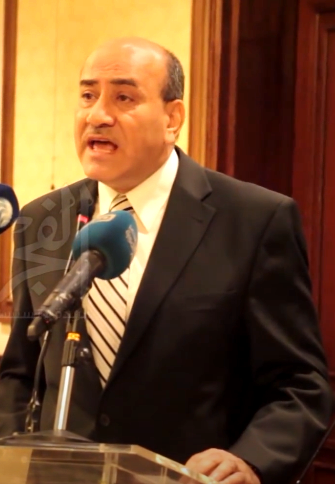
Hisham Genena (2017)

Hisham Genena, also spelled Geneina or Genina (Arabic: هشام جنينة; born 1954 in Daqahlia) is a former police officer, public prosecutor, judge, chief auditor, anti-corruption advocate, and vice-presidential candidate. Genena was deputy head of the Court of Cassation, Egypt's highest court of appeal, and head of the Egyptian public finance oversight body, the Central Auditing Organization (CAO) from 2012 to 2016. He was made famous for his anti-corruption statements, and a 350-page CAO report he leaked to the press in 2016 that detailed the high cost of corrupt land deals. This culminated in Genena's removal from office, and subsequent trials which ended in his incarceration two years later while running as a vice-presidential candidate. Genena was released in February 2023 after serving the five-year term.

== Independence of the Judiciary movement ==
Geneina joined progressive judges in the Independence of the Judiciary movement (tayyar istiqlal al-qada') in the 2000s, fighting against retreating judicial independence under president Hosni Mubarak. During the 2011 revolution the movement headed by Geneina called for the removal of Mubarak's last Minister of Justice, Mamdouh Marie, who had survived Mubarak's removal, he condemned the military trials of civilians, and along with the independence movement sought to try Marie after he left office for influencing the outcome of several cases of illicit gains and obstructing justice during his post.

== Head of CAO ==
Geneina was appointed as head of CAO by president Mohamed Morsi in September 2012. He was the agency's first head after the 2011 uprising, succeeding Mubarak era chairman, Gawdat al-Malt, who resigned more than a year earlier almost immediately after Mubarak was deposed.

Corruption cases lodged against Mubarak and his circle were still in court then, and anti-corruption groups called on Geneina to release information held by the CAO that could aid in their prosecution.

=== Anti-corruption statements ===
In February 2014, during the interim government of Adly Mansour that was appointed after Morsi was deposed in July 2013, Geneina announced at a press conference that he had referred more than 900 cases to the prosecutor general, the administrative prosecutor and Illegal Gains Agency, highlighting how less than 7 percent of those cases are known to have been put under investigation or taken to trial.

=== Anti-corruption report ===
In a December 2015 with Al-Youm al-Sabea newspaper, Hesham Geneina gave a statement that "corruption in 2015 exceeded LE 600 billion [$75 bn at the time],” which drew a swift response from president Abdel Fattah al-Sisi who formed a fact-finding committee which slammed the report and accused Geneina of deliberate deception and exaggerating the extent of corruption. Even though the committee confirmed the accuracy of the LE600 billion figure, though over the years 2012-2015 and not in one year, Geneina was removed from the CAO in March of that year, and on July 28, 2016, the Cairo court for minor offenses convicted Hisham Geneina of disseminating false information and gave him a suspended one-year sentence, which was condemned by local and international rights and anti-corruption organisations.

During most of that time, the report was still with the CAO and the investigating bodies, and the general public did not know any of its contents, but in June 2016, a copy of A study on the analysis of the cost of corruption by application on some sectors in Egypt was leaked by independent news outlet Mada Masr, showing in detail the corruption Geneina intended to fight, and that his publicly state figure was actually conservative compared to the LE876.66 billion calculated only for the New Urban Communities Authority, the government entity in charge of developing new cities and real estate.

== Vice-presidential bid ==
In January 2018, Hisham Genena was to run as vice-president in Sami Anan's bid to contest Abdel Fatah al-Sisi in the 2018 Egyptian presidential election. On 27 January 2018, Genena was attacked by three unidentified men outside his home. Anan was later arrested, and in an effort to put pressure on the government to release him, Genena threatened to reveal documents showing that army leaders played a role in encouraging social unrest after the Egyptian revolution of 2011, and mentioned documents abroad believed to be in the possession of the international lawyer Mahmoud Refaat who was the spokesman of Sami Anan and the director of his presidential campaign abroad. On 12 February, Genena was arrested, and later also Moataz Wadnan, the journalist who had interviewed him for the Huffington Post.

In April 2018, Geneina was sentenced to 5 years in prison for "insulting the military", a sentence which was upheld in March 2019.

In February 2023, Hicham Geneina was released after five years in prison for "terrorism" and "false information", then immediately prosecuted for the same charges by another Egyptian court This means that he can be arrested at any time is prosecuted in another case managed by the civil prosecutor's office of State Security.
