= Raseef22 =

Liberal Arabic media network

Raseef22 رصيف22
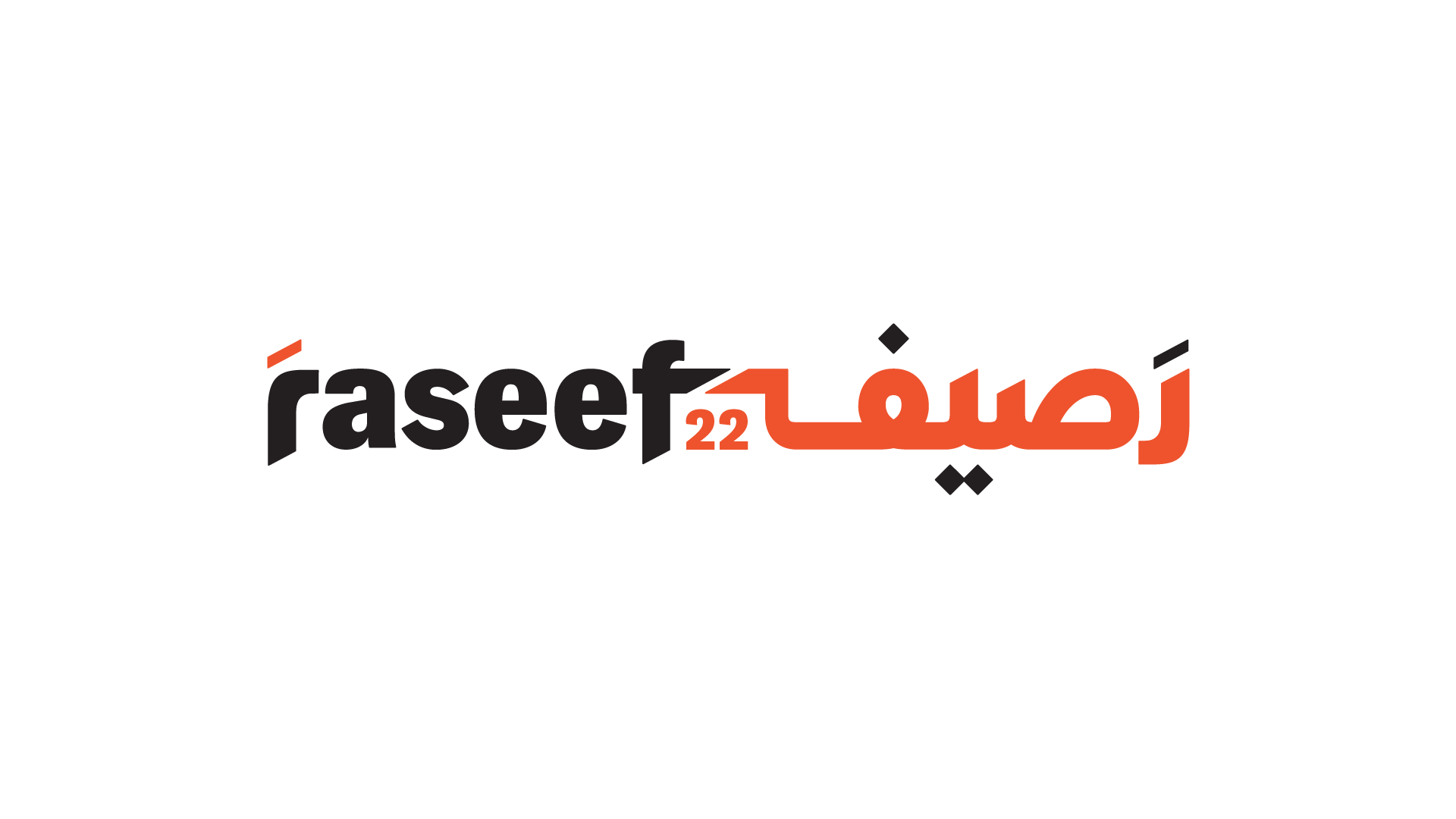
- Type: Online
- Publisher: Kareem Sakka
- Editor-in-chief: Ayman Sharrouf
- Founded: August 2013
- Political alignment: Liberalism
- Language: Arabic, English, Persian
- Headquarters: Lebanon
- Website: raseef22.net

Raseef22 (Arabic: رصيف22) is a liberal Arabic media network founded in 2013 based in Beirut, Lebanon. It publishes content in Arabic and English from different Arab states and describes itself as an independent media platform. International Media Support mentions Raseef22 along with HuffPost Arabic and Al Jazeera as one of the biggest Pan-Arab online platforms.

== Name ==
The Arabic word raseef (رَصِيف) means platform or pavement, and the number 22 refers to the number of states in the Arab League.

== History ==
Kareem Sakka co-founded Raseef22 in the aftermath of the Arab Spring, which he cites as a source of inspiration. In an article in The Washington Post, he wrote that Raseef22 was created as a "digital space for those eager to know what was going on around them."

Raseef22 was one of the 500 websites censored in Egypt in late 2017 after it published an article on Egyptian security agencies' vies to influence the media. After the site was blocked in Egypt, it was targeted in a cyber attack that took it offline in locations around the world.

Jamal Khashoggi wrote for Raseef22 regularly. One of his notable articles was "Notes on the Freedom of the Arabs from Oslo, Norway," published June 5, 2018.

The site was blocked in Saudi Arabia December 2018 when the Saudi Ministry of Communications and Information Technology ordered its censorship due to its "unprecedented response to the assassination of Jamal Khashoggi in Istanbul." This decision might have also been related to Raseef22's coverage of Saudi-Israeli relations and interviews with activists later imprisoned or placed under house arrest coverage

In 2019 the Association of LGBT Journalists (AJL) in Paris gave Raseef22 a golden foreign press award for its six-month series of articles on gender and sexuality issues.

== Readership ==
According to its publisher in 2019, the news agency counted 12 million readers annually from 22 Arab nations. Of the readership, he wrote that it "believes in the talent and promise of the Arab mind and sees the ugliness of tyranny, patriarchy, misogyny and the futility of proxy rulers and wars." Al-Quds Al-Arabi described Raseef22 as "oriented to the youth."
