= Keaton Ellerby =

Canadian ice hockey player (born 1988)

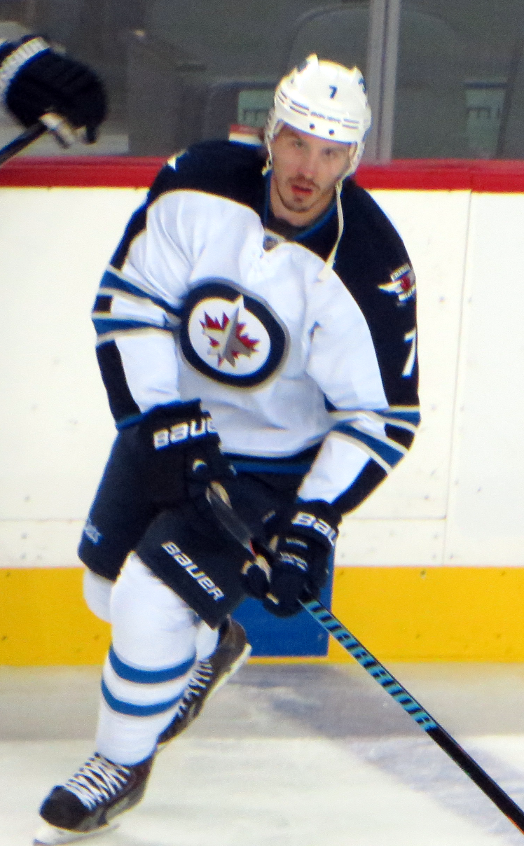
- Ellerby with the Winnipeg Jets in 2014
- Born: November 5, 1988 (age 37) Strathmore, Alberta, Canada
- Height: 6 ft 5 in (196 cm)
- Weight: 216 lb (98 kg; 15 st 6 lb)
- Position: Defence
- Shot: Left
- Played for: Florida Panthers; Los Angeles Kings; Winnipeg Jets; Barys Astana; HC Fribourg-Gottéron; Lukko; Mora IK; Iserlohn Roosters; Dornbirn Bulldogs; Ferencvárosi TC; Sheffield Steelers
- NHL draft: 10th overall, 2007; Florida Panthers
- Playing career: 2008–2022

Keaton Ellerby (born November 5, 1988) is a Canadian former professional ice hockey player. He last played under contract with the Sheffield Steelers of the Elite Ice Hockey League (EIHL). He previously played in the National Hockey League for the Florida Panthers, Los Angeles Kings and Winnipeg Jets.

== Playing career ==
=== Junior ===
Ellerby was drafted 10th overall by the Florida Panthers in the 2007 NHL entry draft from the Kamloops Blazers of the Western Hockey League. During the 2008 World Junior Hockey Championship, Ellerby was invited to try out for the tournament, having played for Canada at the 2007 Superseries against the Russians.

=== Professional ===
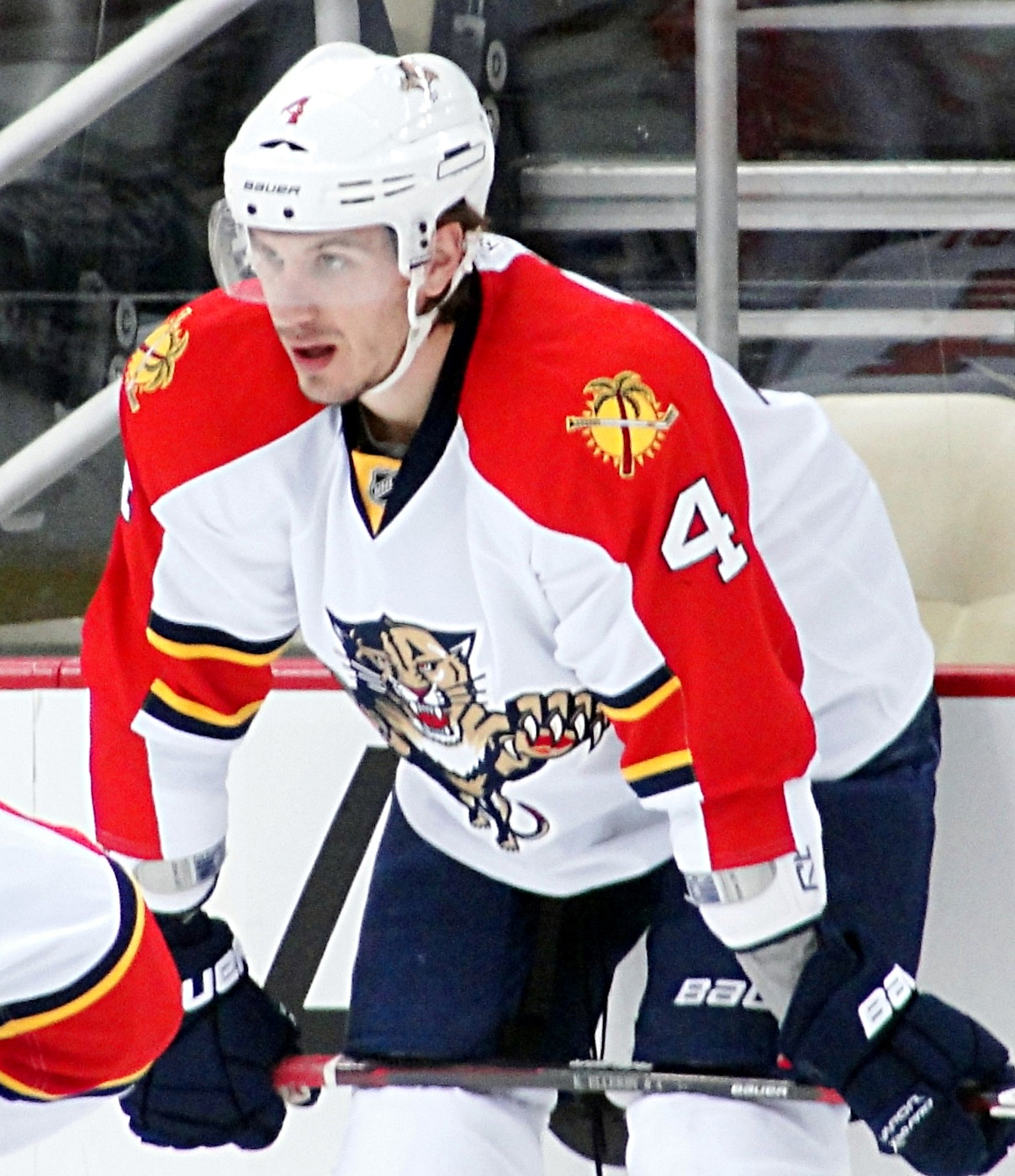
Ellerby as a member of the Panthers in 2012

Ellerby scored his first NHL goal on January 25, 2011, against Henrik Lundqvist of the New York Rangers. During the 2012–13 season, on February 8, 2013, Ellerby was traded by the Panthers to the Los Angeles Kings for a fifth-round selection in the 2013 NHL Draft. The Kings re-signed Ellerby to a one-year deal in July 2013, but he was claimed off waivers by the Winnipeg Jets a month into the 2013–14 season.

Ellerby signed a one-year contract with the Jets the following summer for the 2014–15 season. He spent most of the season in the minors.

On July 7, 2015, Ellerby signed his first contract abroad, agreeing to a one-year deal with Barys Astana of the Kontinental Hockey League. After 42 games with the Kazakh-based club, Ellerby sought a release and immediately signed with Swiss team HC Fribourg-Gottéron of the National League A on January 4, 2016, for the remainder of the 2015–16 season. Ellerby also played for Team Canada during that year's Spengler Cup and won the championship, scoring one of the goals in the final game.

The following season, Ellerby signed for the 2016–17 season with Finnish Liiga outfit, Lukko Rauma. Ellerby proved to be a solid addition to Lukko's blueline, contributing steady defensive play to go along with 3 goals and 12 points in 43 games.

On July 10, 2017, Ellerby agreed to a one-year deal with top tier Swedish club, Mora IK of the Swedish Hockey League (SHL). He contributed with a heavily defensive role, logging the most blocked shots in the SHL and playing big minutes. After one season with the struggling club, he agreed to a one-year deal with German club Iserlohn Roosters of the DEL, on September 13, 2018.

A free agent midway into the 2019–20 season, Ellerby continued his professional career by signing with the Dornbirn Bulldogs of the neighbouring Austrian Hockey League on November 18, 2019.

In the 2020–21 season, Ellerby moved to Hungary to sign for Erste Liga side Ferencvárosi TC.

In August 2021, Ellerby agreed to terms with UK EIHL side Sheffield Steelers for the 2021–22 season, following in the footsteps of Justin Hodgman who also moved to Sheffield from Ferencvarosi earlier in the summer. Ellerby retired from hockey in the summer of 2022.

== International play ==
In December 2015, he won the Spengler Cup with Team Canada.

== Coaching career ==
Upon retirement from playing in 2022, Ellerby was named an assistant coach of the Western Hockey League (WHL) team Prince Albert Raiders.

== Personal life ==
Ellerby is first cousins with Shane Doan, former captain of the Arizona Coyotes, and second cousin to Carey Price, goaltender of the Montreal Canadiens. Ellerby's uncle, Alvin Liknes, was a Calgary businessman whose disappearance and murder garnered national attention in 2014. He is married to Lauren, with whom he has a son. Lauren joined forces with Annie Montoya, whose husband Al Montoya played with Keaton on the Jets, to create a firm focused on assisting with the relocation of athletes and their families.

== Career statistics ==
=== Regular season and playoffs ===
			Regular season					Playoffs
Season	Team	League	GP	G	A	Pts	PIM	GP	G	A	Pts	PIM
2004–05	Kamloops Blazers	WHL	60	0	1	1	77	6	0	0	0	16
2005–06	Kamloops Blazers	WHL	68	2	6	8	121	—	—	—	—	—
2006–07	Kamloops Blazers	WHL	69	2	23	25	120	4	1	2	3	12
2007–08	Kamloops Blazers	WHL	16	0	3	3	29	—	—	—	—	—
2007–08	Moose Jaw Warriors	WHL	53	2	21	23	81	5	0	2	2	15
2008–09	Rochester Americans	AHL	75	3	20	23	44	—	—	—	—	—
2009–10	Rochester Americans	AHL	58	6	13	19	34	7	1	0	1	4
2009–10	Florida Panthers	NHL	22	0	0	0	2	—	—	—	—	—
2010–11	Rochester Americans	AHL	17	2	3	5	8	—	—	—	—	—
2010–11	Florida Panthers	NHL	54	2	10	12	22	—	—	—	—	—
2011–12	Florida Panthers	NHL	40	0	5	5	10	1	0	0	0	2
2012–13	Florida Panthers	NHL	9	0	0	0	36	—	—	—	—	—
2012–13	Los Angeles Kings	NHL	35	0	3	3	16	5	0	0	0	0
2013–14	Winnipeg Jets	NHL	51	2	4	6	2	—	—	—	—	—
2014–15	St. John's IceCaps	AHL	41	3	13	16	32	—	—	—	—	—
2014–15	Winnipeg Jets	NHL	1	0	1	1	0	—	—	—	—	—
2015–16	Barys Astana	KHL	42	2	7	9	49	—	—	—	—	—
2015–16	HC Fribourg–Gottéron	NLA	13	1	5	6	0	—	—	—	—	—
2016–17	Lukko	Liiga	43	3	9	12	12	—	—	—	—	—
2017–18	Mora IK	SHL	52	0	6	6	26	—	—	—	—	—
2018–19	Iserlohn Roosters	DEL	51	1	8	9	46	—	—	—	—	—
2019–20	Dornbirner EC	AUT	26	4	7	11	16	—	—	—	—	—
2020–21	Ferencvárosi TC	EL	34	4	12	16	—	10	0	2	2	—
2021–22	Sheffield Steelers	EIHL	51	1	10	11	94	2	0	0	0	2
AHL totals			191	14	49	63	118	7	1	0	1	4
NHL totals			212	4	23	27	88	6	0	0	0	2

=== International ===
Year	Team	Event	GP	G	A	Pts	PIM
2005	Canada Pacific	U17	6	0	1	1	0
2005	Canada	IH18	5	0	1	1	4
2006	Canada	U18	5	0	1	1	10
Junior totals			16	0	3	3	14

Awards and achievements
Preceded by Michael Frolík	Florida Panthers first-round draft pick 2007	Succeeded by Dmitry Kulikov
