= Murder of Cherish Perrywinkle =

2013 murder of 8-year-old American girl

Cherish Perrywinkle
- Cherish Lily Perrywinkle
- Born: Cherish Lily Perrywinkle; December 24, 2004; Orlando, Florida
- Died: June 22, 2013 (aged 8); Jacksonville, Florida
- Cause of death: Ligature strangulation
- Body discovered: June 22, 2013
- Resting place: Riverside Memorial Park
- Parent(s): Rayne Perrywinkle (mother); Billy Jarreau (father)

Cherish Lily Perrywinkle (December 24, 2004 – June 22, 2013) was an 8-year-old girl from Jacksonville, Florida who was abducted from a Walmart on June 21, 2013. She was seen on CCTV cameras leaving the store with a man named Donald James Smith (born September 4, 1956) who was later convicted of her murder and sentenced to death.

== Life and murder ==
Cherish Lily Perrywinkle was born in Jacksonville, Florida on Christmas Eve of 2004 to Rayne Perrywinkle and Billy Jarreau, who were never married and had custody battles.

On June 21, 2013, around 8:00 p.m., Rayne, Cherish, and her two younger sisters went shopping when they first met Donald Smith at a Dollar General, where he offered to buy them clothes they could not afford with a $100 Walmart gift card. The Perrywinkles then got into his white van and went with him to Walmart, where they shopped for the next two hours. At 10:30 p.m., Smith offered to get them cheeseburgers at the in-store McDonald's and asked if he could take Cherish with him. However, surveillance footage shows that they walked out of the store instead, which was the last time Cherish was seen alive. About half an hour later, Rayne called the police to report that her daughter had been abducted; an Amber alert was issued five hours later. The next morning, Cherish's body was found in a creek behind Highlands Baptist Church. It is believed that Smith had bound her in the back of his van, where she was sexually assaulted and strangled to death.

== Smith's arrest ==
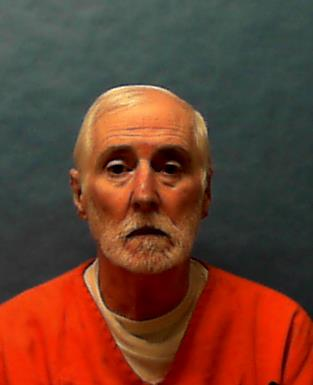
Donald James Smith

Police immediately identified Smith as the abductor, with his van being one of the main focuses. Around 9:00 a.m. the next day, officers saw his van on the interstate and cornered him before he surrendered and was promptly arrested. Smith was known to police as a local sex offender with a long criminal history including numerous offenses against minors. He had been released from jail only three weeks before Cherish's murder.

== Trial ==
Smith's trial began in February 2018. He was found guilty of first-degree murder and sexual battery and was sentenced to death in May 2018. The jurors were in tears after witnessing crime scene photos of the murder as the defense tried to suppress the images. Julie Schlax, the defense attorney, urged the jurors to focus on the law and not their raw emotions.

In April 2021, the Supreme Court of Florida upheld Smith's conviction and death sentence.

== See also ==
- List of death row inmates in the United States
- List of kidnappings (2010–2019)
- List of murdered American children

== Cited works and further reading ==
- Crewe, Sabrina (2015). The FBI and Crimes Against Children. Pennsylvania: Mason Crest Publishers Inc. ISBN 978-1-422-20570-9.
- Douglas, John; Olshaker, Mark (2012). The Cases That Haunt Us. New York: Scribner. ISBN 978-0-743-21239-7.
- Petherick, Wayne; Petherick, Natasha (2015). Homicide. London: Academic Press. ISBN 978-0-128-12529-8.
- Prentky, Robert A.; Barbaree, Howard E.; Janus, Eric S. (2015). Sexual Predators: Society, Risk, and the Law. Oxfordshire: Taylor & Francis. ISBN 978-0-415-87045-0.
- Ramsland, Katherine; McGrain, Patrick N. (2009). Inside the Minds of Sexual Predators. Santa Barbara: ABC-CLIO. ISBN 978-0-313-37960-4.
- Richards, Cara (2000). The Loss of Innocents: Child Killers and Their Victims. Washington: Scholarly Resources. ISBN 978-0-520-28287-2.
- Rinek, Jeffrey L.; Strong, Marilee (2018). In the Name of the Children: An FBI Agent's Relentless Recruit of America's Worst Predators. London: Quercus Editions Ltd. ISBN 978-1-529-40188-2.
