= Murder of Naga Vaishnavi =

Indian murder victim (2000–2010)

Naga Vaishnavi
- Born: Palagani Naga Vaishnavi; 21 January 2000; Andhra Pradesh, India
- Died: 2 February 2010 (aged 10); Andhra Pradesh, India
- Known for: Being kidnapped and murdered by her kidnappers
- Parents: Palagani Prabhakara Rao (father); Narmada Vaishnavi (mother)

Palagani Naga Vaishnavi (21 January 2000 – 2 February 2010) was the daughter of Palagani Prabhakara Rao, a noted businessman from Andhra Pradesh, India, and his second wife Narmada. In 2018, three relatives of Prabhakara Rao's first wife were convicted of the girl's kidnapping and murder, and sentenced to life in prison.

== Disappearance and aftermath ==
Vaishnavi was kidnapped on 30 January 2010, and murdered by her kidnappers on 2 February. The crime was a tremendous shock for her father, resulting in his cardiac arrest and death. She had previously been kidnapped in 2005. Her murder caused widespread outrage throughout Andhra Pradesh.

Her older brother, Sai Tejesh, escaped from the truck when Vaishnavi was kidnapped. Her father had sought justice for his daughter's murder, and soon died due to a heart attack.

A Vijayawada Women's Sessions Court in June 2018 sentenced the three accused perpetrators to life imprisonment.

Both of Vaishnavi's parents died before the accused were sentenced.

== Kidnapping, arrests and convictions ==
Morla Srinivas Rao, Jagadeesh, and Venkata Rao, three relatives of Prabhakar's first wife, planned to force Prabhakar to relinquish a significant portion of his property, writing it in the name of his first wife, as Prabhakar's first marriage was childless.

The three accused intercepted Vaishnavi's car on January 30, 2010. They fatally stabbed the driver, kidnapped Vaishnavi, and later suffocated her to death. They later disposed of her body in an industrial furnace owned by Srinivasa Rao.

The trial, eight years after Vaishnavi's death, relied on circumstantial evidence, including eyewitness accounts, call records, and a crucial piece of evidence—Vaishnavi's earrings found in the furnace. The accused have the option to appeal their life imprisonment verdict in the Hyderabad High Court.

== See also ==
- List of kidnappings (2010–2019)
- List of solved missing person cases (2010s)
