= Gilberto Ventura Ceballos =

Dominican serial killer

- Born: July 6, 1975 (age 51); Santo Domingo, Dominican Republic
- Other name: Carlos Alberto Aguirre Valencia
- Conviction: Murder
- Penalty: 30 years imprisonment

Details
- Victims: 5
- Span of crimes: 2010–2011
- Country: Panama
- State: Panamá Oeste
- Date apprehended: For the last time on September 22, 2017
- Imprisoned at: Recaptured on 13 February by Panamanian policemen

Gilberto Ventura Ceballos (born July 6, 1975) is a Dominican serial killer who murdered five Panamanian youths in the city of La Chorrera between 2010 and 2011, all of his victims being of Chinese descent.

== Crimes ==
Between 2010 and 2011, with the help of Alcibiades Méndez, Ceballos abducted and murdered five teenagers in La Chorrera: Yessenia Argelis Loo Kam, Yong Jian Wu, Samy Zeng Chen, Joel Maurio Liu Wong and Georgina del Carmen Lee Chen. The murders shocked the city, and the authorities were mobilized. Eventually, the bodies of the deceased were found buried under a residence in the El Trapichito sector of the city.

Soon after, Ceballos was detained in the Dominican Republic and extradited to Panama in 2011, where he was put on pre-trial detention. However, on December 28, 2016, with the aid of several accomplices, he managed to escape from the La Joyita Prison, outside of the capital. He hid for around a year, before eventually being captured by authorities in Jacó, Costa Rica on September 22, 2017. When he was seized, he was using false documents, presenting himself as a Colombian national named Carlos Alberto Aguirre Valencia. Ceballos was arrived in the capital through Albrook Airport, with shackles on his hands and feet, and was quickly put in a maximum security prison cell.

On September 29, 2017, he was charged with escaping from prison and conspiracy to commit a crime. His trial was first supposed to have started on October 26, but a Panamanian court postponed it until November 23.

Ceballos' lawyer, Rogelio Cruz, filed a habeas corpus motion to the Judicial Branch of Panama, arguing that the pre-trial detention that his client had received was unlawful, also adding that he was vilified by the media. This move was criticized by Cristobal Fu, the legal representative of the victims' family members, who noted that the motion was probably filed in order to stall the proceedings.

The defense team filed a 3-month period postponement request to the Public Prosecutor's Office, which was denied due to its complexity. Cruz claimed that he needed time to analyze the 500-page file, as he had not been able to properly access it. However, the trial proceeded either way. Prior to Ceballos' arrival in court, the relatives of the victims presented their complaints concerning the defense's constant delayings of the procedure. When the defendant arrived, he tried to assume his own defense, a move denied by the court. Ceballos subsequently pleaded not guilty to the murder charges.

On November 29, a second hearing concerning the complex case was cancelled, as one of the defense lawyers representing one of the other accused parties was missing.

On December 4, the Deputy Prosecutor of Organized Crime Miguel Tuñón requested an extension of 4 months to further investigate all suspects involved in the case due to its sheer size. The Magistrate Judge, Francisco Carpintero, agreed to the proposal.

After being found guilty of all charges on June 22, 2018, Ceballos and his accomplice Méndez were both sentenced to 50 years imprisonment for murdering the youths. The same sentence was also given to Keyla Gisselle Bendibú Salazar and Mario Luis Vega, who had acted as secondary accomplices in three of the murders. A sentence of 15 years was given to Kenny Alezander Bendibú Salazar and Roberto Antonio Mariscal for being accomplices in homicide, but were acquitted of kidnapping charges. Coupled with all this, all of them would be disqualified from public functions for a term of 10 years once they serve out their sentences.

After two years of being incarcerated, he escaped from prison on February 2, 2020.

He was recaptured by the national police on February 13, 2020, in the community of El Salado, Remedios, province of Chiriquì, Republic of Panamà.

== See also ==
- List of serial killers by country
- List of kidnappings
- List of prison escapes
