= Trương Duy Nhất =

Vietnamese activist

- Citizenship: Vietnamese
- Occupation: Journalist

Trương Duy Nhất is a Vietnamese journalist and activist.

== 2013 arrest in Vietnam ==
In May 2013, Trương was arrested in Vietnam following posting an article calling for Communist Party chief Nguyen Phu Trong and Prime Minister Nguyen Tan Dung to resign. In March 2014, he was sentenced to 2 years in prison on charges of “abusing democratic freedoms to infringe the interests of the state” under Vietnam's article 258.

Following his detention, he fled to Thailand in 2016.

== 2019 abduction from Thailand ==
In January 2019, Trương was abducted from a shopping in Thailand while applying for refugee status and handed over to Vietnamese authorities, who brought Trương back to Vietnam via Laos.

In March 2020, Trương was sentenced to 10 years in prison on charges of fraud.

== See also ==
- Đường Văn Thái, Vietnamese journalist abducted from Thailand in 2023 and sentenced to prison in Vietnam
- List of kidnappings (2010–2019)
