= Moataz Wadnan =

Egyptian journalist

- Born: Egypt
- Occupation: Journalist
- Known for: being kidnapped and held in custody by the Egyptian government

Moataz Wadnan (Arabic: معتز ودنان) is an Egyptian journalist for HuffPost Arabi. In February 2018, after interviewing Hisham Geneina, Wadnam was arrested and subsequently disappeared in state custody.

== Kidnapping ==
In February 2018, Wadnan interviewed Hisham Geneina, Egypt's former anti-corruption official, who had supported Sami Anan's bid to run against Abdel Fatah al-Sisi in the 2018 Egyptian presidential election. Geneina claimed he had access to documents showing that army leaders played a role in encouraging social unrest after the Egyptian revolution of 2011, and threatened to release these documents if Anan's life was threatened. Geneina was subsequently arrested, and on 16 February, police arrested Wadnan. He has been detained in the Tora prison complex, along with the human rights activist Ezzat Ghoniem and the journalists Mustafa al-Assar and Hassan al-Banna Mubarak, pending investigation of joining a "banned group" and publishing false information. He was released on 20 July 2021, but charges against him are still pending.

== See also ==
- List of kidnappings
