= Central Auditing Organization =

The Central Auditing Organization (Arabic: الجهاز المركزي للمحاسبات) is an independent auditing institution established in Egypt in 1942 as an instrument of public finance control.

== History ==
Originally created as the Divan of Accounting, its name was changed to Divan of Auditing in 1960, before acquiring its current designation in 1964.

In 1995 it hosted XV INCOSAI, the fifteenth triennial convention of the International Organization of Supreme Audit Institutions.

== Function and structure ==
The CAO supervises the management of public-sector companies and government departments, including about 130 central government departments and administrative units, 120 service agencies, 27 governorates, 50 economic authorities and more than 160 state-owned enterprises, political parties, trade unions, national and party news media, and all units subsidised by the State. The CAO may also audit and examine the work and accounts of any other entity, as assigned by the President, the Prime Minister or the People's Assembly of Egypt. It is independent of the cabinet, and reports directly to the President of Egypt, to whom it is subordinated.

== Former heads ==
- Fakhry Abbas Ramadan, 1989 — 1997
- Shawky al-Sayid Ahmed Khater, 1997 — 1999
- Gawdat al-Malt, 1999 — 2011
- Hisham Geneina, 2012 — 2016
