= Murder of Rachael Anderson =

2018 murder

- Undated photo of Rachael Anderson
- Location: Warren, Ohio, United States
- Date: January 28, 2018 (aged 24)
- Attack type: Murder by ligature strangulation, kidnapping, rape, robbery
- Victim: Rachael Anderson
- Perpetrator: Anthony Pardon
- Charges: Murder; Rape; Kidnapping; Aggravated robbery; Aggravated burglary
- Verdict: Guilty of all charges
- Sentence: Life imprisonment without the possibility of parole.

The murder of Rachael Anderson occurred on January 28, 2018, in Columbus, Ohio, United States. Anderson, a twenty-four-year-old aspiring funeral director, was kidnapped, raped, and murdered by Anthony Pardon in her apartment on her birthday.

Pardon, a registered sex offender with an extensive criminal history, left Anderson's body in her bedroom closet where she was discovered the next day. A significant amount of evidence linked Pardon to the crime, including cellphone data and DNA. He was arrested and charged with Anderson's murder.

He was convicted in 2020 and sentenced to life in prison without the possibility of parole.

== Victim ==
Rachael Nicoletta Anderson was born on January 28, 1994, to William "Bill" Anderson and Patricia "Trish" Anderson (née Sprecacenere) in Warren, Ohio. In 2012 she graduated from Warren G. Harding High School where she was part of the National Honor Society, played soccer and volleyball and was in band. Anderson, who wanted to become a funeral director, attended Youngstown State University where she majored in prerequisites for mortuary science and made the Dean's List. She then attended the Cincinnati College of Mortuary Science, graduating in 2016 with a Bachelor's degree in Mortuary Science. While in mortuary school, she worked at the Naegele-Kleb-Ihlendorf Funeral Home. Anderson, who was a member of the Ohio Funeral Directors Association, moved to Columbus where she began an apprenticeship at the Shaw Davis Funeral Home. At the time of her murder, Anderson was nearing the end of that apprenticeship, and, according to the funeral home’s manager, was going to be offered a job. Anderson’s murder occurred on her twenty-fourth birthday. Anderson was buried at Pineview Memorial Park.

== Perpetrator ==
Anthony Pardon
- 2018 mugshot of Pardon
- Born: November 29, 1964 (age 61)
- Convictions: Aggravated murder Aggravated burglary Aggravated robbery Kidnapping; Rape
- Penalty: Life imprisonment without possibility of parole

Details
- Victims: Rachael Anderson and others
- Imprisoned at: Lebanon Correctional Institution

Anthony Pardon is a recidivist violent offender and sexual offender whose criminal history prior to Anderson’s murder involves several rapes, including the rape of an infant and the rape of an eight-year-old girl, along with robbery, kidnapping, and attempted murder. At the time of Anderson’s murder, he had spent a total of thirty-three years in prison for his crimes and was registered as a Tier III sex offender.

According to Pardon's defense attorneys, he had an "abused (sic), dysfunctional, chaotic childhood." He was raised by his grandparents before living with his mother. He developed conduct disorder and antisocial personality disorder.

=== Criminal history ===
In March 1979, Pardon, then fourteen, was temporarily committed to the Ohio Youth Commission after he raped an eight-year-old girl. In July of that year, he was made a ward of the Court and temporarily committed to Franklin County Children Services. And in December of that year, Pardon was found guilty of menacing and permanently committed to the Ohio Youth Commission as well as being placed in foster care.

In 1980 Pardon was charged with raping a nine-month-old child. The victim of this rape was the son of Pardon's foster parents. Pardon, who was fifteen when he committed the crime, was babysitting while his foster mother went out grocery shopping. He told Columbus police that he committed the crime because he was upset after having a fight with his girlfriend. Pardon was convicted of the crime as a juvenile.

On November 13, 1981, Pardon, then sixteen, was allowed into the home of his girlfriend’s thirty-nine-year-old mother to use her phone. He pulled a butcher knife on her, raped her at knife point and stole one hundred dollars from her purse. He bound her hands and feet together, gagged her, and put her in the trunk of a car. He proceeded to drive her to Valley Dale, where he untied her feet and threw her into Alum Creek behind the Valley Dale Ballroom. When Pardon saw that the victim, who was partially clothed, was able to keep afloat, he went into the creek and held her head under the water. The woman survived after a good Samaritan intervened. Pardon left before police arrived and used the money he stole from the victim to buy tennis shoes and a jogging outfit.

Pardon was tried as an adult, and in May 1982, at age seventeen, he was convicted of aggravated robbery, rape, and attempted murder in Franklin County, Ohio. Pardon was sentenced to five to twenty-five years in prison. He was originally sent to the Ohio State Reformatory in Mansfield but was transferred to the Lebanon Correctional Institution and later to the Southern Ohio Correctional Facility in Lucasville. While in prison he acquired several disciplinary infractions, including possessing weapons, setting fire to a mattress, and fighting. He ultimately spent more than twenty-four years in prison for the crime and was released in November 2006.

Pardon was declared a sexual predator in 1999.

Pardon moved to Georgia in 2006 or 2007 and applied for a maintenance job under a false name. In 2007 he was charged with forgery and failure to register as a sex offender in Georgia. He was convicted of these offenses in Floyd County, Georgia and spent nine years in prison for them. He was also given twenty years of probation and was required to wear a GPS ankle monitor and pay for all expenses.

In 2017 Pardon was released from prison, returning to Ohio in June of that year through an interstate compact agreement between Ohio and Georgia. He was monitored by the Adult Parole Authority and required to check in with the Sheriff's Department every ninety days. Ohio’s Adult Parole Authority did not give him a monitor, as a judge had requested, because of the length of time spent monitoring and “the expense issue.” On August 21, 2017, Pardon was caught with a prostitute in his car. Though he told police he was giving her a ride, the woman confirmed to local news that he was interested in sexual activity. At 4:00 AM on January 27, 2018, he was caught driving without a license. During that stop, he was found to have a pocket knife, a kitchen knife, and a pellet gun. He was not arrested.

== Background ==
Anderson celebrated her twenty-fourth birthday on January 26 and January 27, 2018. On the 26th her brother John came from Warren to Columbus to stay with her. The next day, Anderson and her brother went to the home of their friend John Kennedy. There, the Andersons, the Kennedys and other friends had a party to celebrate Anderson's birthday. The Anderson siblings spent the night at the Kennedy's house and came back to Anderson's home on the 28th. Anderson worked on both the 26th and 27th. During the times she was at work she gave her brother her key so that he could come and go as he wanted. On the 28th John Anderson went back to Warren and accidentally took the key with him. At around 1:00 PM Anderson texted the Kennedys, who owned a key to her home, and said that she would come and pick up their key. Because they were giving a friend a ride to Athens, Ohio, she had to come and get the key later when they returned home. Later that day, at 6:17 PM, Anderson texted the Kennedys saying she would leave in twenty minutes to come and get the key. She spoke to her mother at around 6:30 and then went and got her key from the Kennedys. Because her apartment door could only be locked from the outside with a key, Anderson had to leave it unlocked. She stopped at an Arby’s on the East Side at around 7:30 and then went home.

== Crimes ==
Pardon entered Anderson's apartment at about 8:00 pm. He kidnapped Anderson, taking her from the downstairs of her apartment to the upstairs. He restrained her, tying her feet and ankles together with the cord from her hairdryer and binding her hands with her belt and cords from her blinds. He then wrapped the cord from Anderson’s curling iron between the hairdryer cord and over her wrists, hogtying her. He also gagged her. Pardon forced Anderson to tell him her PIN number. He also tortured her and raped her.

Pardon strangled Anderson with the cord from an electric blanket. In addition to being asphyxiated, Anderson also suffered blunt trauma and a stab wound in her head.

Pardon placed Anderson into her bedroom closet. He left her there, naked from the waist down and with the electric blanket cord tied around her neck and the door knob.

After murdering Anderson, Pardon stole her car. He also took her credit card and debit card and used them at several stores in Columbus. He gave his sister the debit card and went shopping with her. Pardon's sister later learned that the card belonged to a murder victim when she watched the news.

Pardon also gave the debit card to a homeless man named Anthony Sleets, claiming that his girlfriend was trying to take his money after a falling out, and offered to buy Sleets a hotel room if he used the card. Pardon gave Sleets Anderson's PIN number and drove Sleets to several ATMs.

== Investigation ==
On January 29, Anderson failed to come to work or answer her phone. The office supervisor of Shaw Davis Funeral Home asked a coworker who was out doing deliveries, to go to Anderson’s apartment to check on her. He went to Anderson's home and when she failed to respond, he went to the rental office and explained the situation. Because neither Anderson's co-worker nor employees at the rental office were allowed to enter Anderson's home, her co-worker contacted police. Police responded and had the rental agent inspect Anderson's apartment, but the rental agent did not locate Anderson.

Afterward, Anderson's former roommate gave her friend Johnathan Kennedy permission to inspect the apartment. Kennedy entered Anderson's bedroom, which he found out of place. He testified that he tried to look in the closet but when he tried to pull the door open it felt like something was pulling it back. When he was able to open the closet door, he found Anderson's body. He tried to help her but realized she was dead and went outside and notified officer Frank Sclafani.

Investigators responded, finding Anderson's bound body partially wrapped in a comforter. There was also a shirt wrapped around her head and a black clothing item knotted around her neck and shoved into her mouth.

An autopsy performed on Anderson's body determined that she had been strangled and stabbed. She suffered a laceration to her scalp and fractures in the base of her skull. The stab wound went through the back of her neck and penetrated the left cerebral hemisphere and internal capsule of her brain. Anderson was stabbed with so much force that part of her skull broke off. The autopsy also revealed that Anderson was strangled with the cord from an electric blanket and that the strangulation led her to suffer hemorrhages in her sternocleidomastoid muscles and eyelids and caused the vessels in her eyes to become overfilled with blood. Additionally, it showed that Anderson had bruises and red marks on her ankles and wrists, indicating that she was alive when Pardon bound her.

The coroner who performed Anderson's autopsy found that Anderson's death was caused by the stab wound to her head and neck, though the coroner who testified at the trial said had he performed the autopsy, he might have ruled that she died of ligature strangulation.

Pardon's DNA was found on several parts of Anderson's body and at the crime scene. Investigators also found his DNA inside her body when they performed a rape kit.

Location service apps and Pardon's email account on his phone allowed investigators to collect data showing where his phone was located at various times. Data showed that he was at Anderson's apartment from 7:59 to 9:25 PM on January 28, 2018. After police discovered that Anderson’s debit card was missing, they examined bank records. Using cell phone data, they matched Pardon’s whereabouts to the use of her card. Surveillance video also showed Pardon and his sister using Anderson's debit card, as well as Pardon using Anderson's credit card and driving her car. Investigators also spoke to Anthony Sleets after video footage showed him using her card. Sleets told them that a man matching Pardon’s description gave it to him though by the time Pardon became a suspect, Sleets had died. Video showed Pardon and Sleets driving Anderson’s car hours after she was murdered.

The nine-inch steak knife used to stab Anderson was found two weeks after the murder in a box in her apartment by her mother.

== Criminal proceedings ==
Pardon was arrested on February 9, 2018, in the Linden neighborhood by SWAT officers. He was held in jail on a five million dollar bond. On February 15, a Franklin County Grand Jury indicted Pardon on nine counts including aggravated burglary, aggravated robbery, kidnapping, rape, and aggravated murder. The indictment also included death penalty specifications, as well as repeat violent offender, sexually violent predator and repeat attempted murder specifications. He was formally arraigned on February 20 and pleaded not guilty on all charges.

On June 19 Pardon was supposed to appear in court for a pre-trial hearing but refused to do so, accusing Franklin County District Attorney Ron O’Brien of creating a “sideshow” and indicating that he didn’t want to be “paraded” in front of news cameras. Judge Stephen McIntosh, his court reporter, prosecutors, and Pardon’s defense attorneys visited him in his holding cell but he still refused to participate in the hearing.

In December 2019, Pardon sent a handwritten letter to WBNS-TV claiming that he didn’t kill Anderson. Pardon, who wrote that he “didn’t kill anyone” and that “this case is only because of my past” (sic), claimed that he knew Anderson and that they got high together. O’Brien said that Pardon would have known that Anderson had THC in her system because he had access to information from her autopsy through discovery. O’Brien also said that there was no evidence that Anderson knew Pardon and that Pardon’s letter was a tactic to delay the trial and a “desperate act.”

On January 24, 2020, Pardon dismissed his attorneys, despite urges from Judge McIntosh not to do so. McIntosh warned him of the perils of representing himself and asked him a series of questions about self-representation. Pardon said that he understood what he was doing. His former attorneys, Isabella Dixon and Larry Thomas, were to serve as standby attorneys in case he decided he wanted legal representation. According to Thomas, Pardon was unhappy with his representation. However, on January 27, Pardon decided not to represent himself. January 27 was also the start of jury selection.

=== Trial ===
The trial began on Monday, February 4, 2020. Four witnesses testified on the first day including Johnathan Kennedy, who discovered Anderson's body. Anderson's co-worker, and the manager of her apartment complex also testified. Jurors also heard from Officer Frank Sclafani, who was in his car outside the apartment when Kennedy discovered Anderson’s body and saw his body camera footage.

On February 5, Anderson’s brother John and crime scene special agent Joshua Durst testified and on February 6, lead detective Art Hughes testified. Also on February 6, Pardon complained to the judge about his defense attorneys saying "I'm not happy with this here at all" and asked for new lawyers.

On Monday, February 10, prosecutors brought in a latent print examiner, and other expert witnesses who explained how technology was used to place Pardon where Anderson’s debit card was used and at the scene of the murder. Pardon’s sister also testified that Pardon gave her Anderson’s debit card.

The last day of testimony was Tuesday, February 11. A forensic scientist testified that Pardon’s DNA was found at the crime scene while a forensic pathologist and deputy coroner from the Franklin County Coroner's Office testified about Anderson’s injuries. The defense did not call any witnesses.

Closing arguments were held on February 12. Assistant Prosecutor Amy Van Culin gave the state's initial closing argument, constructing a timeline of the crime and telling the jury that Pardon killed Anderson "after and while he trespasses in her own home, her place of safety, the place where she sleeps, the place where she eats, the place where she comes home to relax." In the defense's closing argument, Pardon's attorney Larry Thomas conceded that Pardon used Anderson's cards but argued that he was not responsible for the murder. He argued that the state's case was based on speculation and that the DNA and cell phone evidence did not conclusively prove Pardon's guilt. He also suggested that Kennedy was involved. In the prosecution's rebuttal, Franklin County Prosecutor Ron O'Brien argued that the defense was willing to admit that geolocation evidence showed Pardon used the stolen cards, but disregarded geolocation evidence about Pardon’s whereabouts on the night of the murder.

The jury, which consisted of four men and eight women, deliberated for approximately six hours over two days before finding Pardon guilty of all charges, including aggravated burglary, aggravated robbery, kidnapping, rape, and aggravated murder.

Pardon was eligible for the death penalty because he murdered Anderson during the course of aggravated burglary, kidnapping, aggravated robbery, and rape and because he has a prior conviction for purposefully attempted to kill another victim. Prosecutors sought the death penalty against Pardon due to his extensive criminal history, with O’Brien saying in 2018 "there are some people who can't conform their conduct to the law. And it at least is alleged that he is one of them."

The sentencing phase of the trial began on February 18. The defense argued that the "mitigating factors" such as Pardon’s abusive and dysfunctional upbringing outweighed the aggravating circumstances of the crime, with Dixon saying “you’re going to hear that this man from an abused, (sic) dysfunctional, chaotic childhood went from that dysfunction at sixteen and spent the rest of his life in prison.” Prosecutors argued that the aggravating circumstances outweighed any mitigating factors and that Pardon knew what he was doing when he attacked Anderson with O'Brien saying "he very well understood, the evidence shows, what he was doing. He was robbing, raping and hogtying Rachael Anderson on her birthday." O'Brien also told the jury that "at age fifty-three, as he (Pardon) made those choices as he raped, burgled, hog-tied Rachael Anderson, whatever happened in his childhood deserves zero mitigation." Pardon's mother and sister, along with a psychologist and his former elementary school teacher testified for the defense.

On February 19, Pardon delivered a thirteen-minute unsworn statement to jurors, discussing his abusive childhood. He also spoke about his troubles after he left prison, saying "when I got out there (prison) nobody gave me nothing." He claimed that "the system" failed him, saying "the prison system failed me, social services failed me. Everybody," and told jurors that his abusive father and "the system" made him "who I am today." During his statement, he did not speak directly about Anderson’s murder or apologize for it, though he did say that he "made a lot of bad choices in my life. You can blame me for that."

Prosecutor Jennifer Rausch responded to Pardon's statement in closing arguments, citing Pardon's poor choices and criminal history and saying "at some point, it is not our fault, as he suggested. That is not your fault. This is not my fault. This is not the system's fault. This is his fault." O'Brien also responded to Pardon's statement, arguing in the state's rebuttal that it was all about him and how others caused him not to be responsible for his crimes. He also claimed that Pardon showed no remorse and criticized him for not apologizing.

On February 20, after deliberating for three and a half hours the jury deadlocked on whether to recommend the death penalty and recommended a life-without-parole sentence.

Sentencing occurred on March 16, 2020. Both of Anderson's parents gave victim impact statements, with her father calling Pardon "an animal who stalked and preyed on our beautiful daughter." Anderson's father also said in his statement: "Over the past few years I have watched him make demands and have temper tantrums as though he was owed something. During the trial, he complained how the system had failed him. If anyone should be complaining it is our family. The system definitely failed Rachael. The department of corrections system failed to keep him on a leash and let him walk free in society. The state highway patrol system failed to protect our daughter by giving him a slap on the wrist and a free ride home the day before he brutally murdered her." In Anderson's mother's impact statement, she told the court "it's frustrating to know the horrors of what was done in his early life and the families that were destroyed prior to ours" and said to Pardon "you stole my daughter's life. You will suffer for it in your new block walls and bars." She also stated "my daughter is Rachael Nicoletta Anderson. She is not case number 19CR00769." Additionally, Anderson's mother expressed disapproval of the fact that the money she made from working that she pays in taxes will support Pardon in prison.

Judge McIntosh sentenced Pardon to one life without parole sentence for aggravated murder and another life without parole sentence for rape. Pardon was also given an additional sixty-three years in prison for aggravated burglary, kidnapping, and aggravated robbery charges and repeat violent offender specifications. The sentences are to be served consecutively.

== See also ==
- List of kidnappings
