= Abduction of Dua Mangi =

Kidnapping case in Karachi

Dua Mangi was abducted on 30 November 2019, outside a restaurant in Karachi's Defense Housing Authority area. She was safely returned home one week later.

== Background ==
Dua Mangi, a law student, who has studied both in the United States and in Karachi. She is the niece of Sindhi poet and columnist Aijaz Mangi, who is known for his outspoken views on feminism, politics, and human rights, and his strong criticism of societal atrocities.

== Abduction ==
Mangi and her friend Haris Soomro were out in the evening getting food from a restaurant on 30 November around 8 pm. While walking back a car with at least four men pulled up alongside them and threatened them with a gun. Other sources have stated that there were five men in the vehicle, with only one using a mask. When Soomro attempted to fight back and protect Mangi he was shot by at least one of the men in the neck and the bullet traveled into his chest. The car used by the abductors was stolen from the area the previous week.

=== Release ===
She was reportedly returned home safely by officials 7 December 2019.

== Investigation ==
The Karachi Police have released a statement in which they believe the abduction occurred because Mangi had met a man in the United States and had been pressuring her to marry him and had threatened her. According to Mangi's father she had a fight with a man shortly before her abduction. At least twenty-two witnesses, mostly of family and friends, spoke with investigators shortly after the abduction.

As Mangi's phone fell onto the road, it was being used to help investigate the abduction. Officials used CCTV footage to attempt to identify the attackers, and have impounded the car they believe to be a part of the crime.

== Response ==
News of her abduction was posted on social media by family and friends, creating a heated debate over victim blaming and whether the perpetrators were actually justified over abducting her due to her actions online and her clothing. With the family's influence in civil society and media, a protest was staged at the city's Teen Talwar roundabout.

== See also ==
- List of kidnappings
- List of solved missing person cases (post-2000)
