= Murder of Hailey Owens =

Child murder in Missouri, US

Hailey Owens
- Hailey Marie Owens
- Born: Hailey Marie Owens; August 18, 2003; Springfield, Missouri, USA
- Died: February 18, 2014 (aged 10); Springfield, Missouri, USA
- Cause of death: Gunshot wound
- Body discovered: February 19, 2014
- Occupation: Student

Hailey Marie Owens (August 18, 2003 – February 18, 2014) was a 10-year-old American girl from Springfield, Missouri, who was abducted, sexually assaulted and murdered by 45-year-old Craig Wood on February 18, 2014. The killing caught attention nationally. Thousands of people attended a candlelight vigil for Hailey on February 23, 2014. A neighborhood park was later dedicated to her called Hailey's Playground. Her family and friends also advocated for improvements to the state's Amber alert system, ultimately leading to the 2019 passage of HAILEY'S Law, which empowers law enforcement officers to issue alerts quicker and to include a URL with each Amber alert.

== Background ==
Hailey was born to parents Stacey Barfield and Ryan Owens in Springfield, Missouri. Hailey was a fourth grader at Westport Elementary at the time of her death. In a news interview, Hailey's mother said she enjoyed helping her babysit and loved little kids. Her mother also stated that Hailey was always smiling, laughing, and willing to help anyone in any way she could.

== Abduction, rape and murder ==
At about 5:00 p.m. on February 18, 2014, Hailey was walking home from a friend's house when a man in a truck pulled over, called to her, and asked for directions. As she approached him, he grabbed her, threw her into his truck, and sped away. Michelle and Carlos Edwards were talking in their garage when they saw a gold Ford Ranger truck pull up, and the driver grabbed Hailey. Michelle wrote down the license plate number, and Carlos ran after the truck while another neighbor, Ricky Riggins, jumped in a vehicle and followed until the truck eluded him.

As Michelle called 911, Carlos knocked on doors trying to find the girl's parents, the search warrant application said. He described the girl to a boy who said it sounded like his sister and took Carlos to his home to talk with his mother. The license plate number led police to Jim and Regina Wood, who informed them that their son Craig Wood was the primary driver of that vehicle.

Hailey's body was found in Craig Michael Wood's home in Springfield. It was inside two garbage bags within plastic storage containers in the basement of the house. She had been raped and shot in the back of the head. There were marks on her wrists indicating that, at some point, she had been tied up. There is video footage of Wood disposing of Hailey's clothing in a dumpster. There is also footage of him buying two bottles of bleach and Liquid Plumber on two separate trips.

== Perpetrator ==
Craig Wood

The suspect in the murder was Craig Michael Wood (born March 25, 1968). He was 49 years old at the time of his conviction. Wood once worked in Springfield as a paraprofessional worker and worked for 16 years as a school football coach at Pleasant View Middle School. He also worked there supervising suspensions and as a teacher's aide and substitute teacher.

Police found over a dozen firearms in his home, as well as child pornography. While searching a bedroom dresser in Wood's home, they discovered stories about sexual fantasies. Two of these handwritten stories involved girls aged 13. Also found were four pictures of young female students who attended the school where Wood had been employed.

Wood had a criminal record. In 1990, he pleaded guilty and was fined $100 after being found in possession of a controlled substance. In 2001, he was convicted of the misdemeanor of stealing wildlife.

Wood's friends report him as having never married or having children and as an amateur bluegrass musician.

== Trial and verdict ==
Wood's trial began October 30, 2017, and prosecutors intended to seek the death penalty, against the wishes of the victim's family. The defense was that the crimes were committed by Wood, but were not premeditated.

On November 2, 2017, the jury found Craig Wood guilty of first-degree murder. The same jury could not agree on a unanimous verdict for the death penalty for Wood, leaving the judge to decide on the sentence.

On January 11, 2018, Judge Thomas Mountjoy sentenced Craig Wood to death by lethal injection. Despite opposing the state's decision to seek the death penalty rather than accepting Wood's plea deal for life without parole, Owens' mother, Stacy Herman, expressed support for Wood's death sentence after the trial, stating that Wood "got what he deserved".

== Reaction ==
A candlelight vigil was organized a few days after Hailey Owens' abduction. Thousands of people marched in the city, ending at a footbridge decorated with purple lights, Hailey's favorite color.

A neighborhood park named Hailey's Playground was dedicated to her.

=== 'Hailey's Law' ===
Hailey Owens' family, joined by the family of Craig Wood, advocated for Hailey's Law, which would consolidate the systems in which an Amber alert is issued, allowing an alert to be issued faster by local police. After almost 5 1/2 years, the law was passed in 2019 and signed by Governor Mike Parson in July. The law went into effect on August 28, 2019.

== See also ==
- List of kidnappings
- Lists of solved missing person cases
