= 2015 Zabul massacre =

Killing of seven Afghan Shia Hazaras

- Location: Zabul Province, Afghanistan
- Date: 9 November 2015
- Target: Shia Hazaras
- Attack type: Genocidal massacre
- Deaths: 7
- Perpetrator: Daesh

The 2015 Zabul massacre refers to the killing of seven Afghan Shia Hazaras on 9 November 2015 in the southern Afghan province of Zabul.

== Hostage-taking and executions ==
Fighters claiming allegiance to the Islamic State took seven members of the Hazara ethnic group hostage in October 2015 in Ghazni and held them in Arghandab District, Zabul Province. The hostages included four men, two women, and a nine-year-old girl, Shukria Tabassum. The hostages were moved 56 times to avoid their rescue by Afghan military forces. Two hundred Taliban fighters were involved in battles with the Islamic State group and another insurgent group.

The hostages were executed on 9 November 2015 by the Islamic State group Several Western media sources described the execution as a beheading. Martine van Bijlert stated that this was most likely a mistranslation (Dari: حلال کردن, halal kardan), and that the victims' throats had been slit, most likely with kite wire sharpened with glass for kite fighting.

The victims were later found by the Taliban. Local elders helped arrange for the bodies to be transferred to a hospital in territory controlled by the Afghan government.

== Legal status ==
Nicholas Haysom, head of the United Nations Assistance Mission in Afghanistan, stated that the killings could constitute war crimes. UNAMA commented that the hostage-taking and murder of civilians are serious violations of humanitarian law.

== Aftermath ==
After the executions the hostages became known as the Zabul Seven. The seven Hazaras killed were identified as Shukuria Tabbasum (9), Gul Pari (45), Sardaro Ali (45), Shaukat Ali (16), Sadiq Ali (18), Mohammad Khan (28) and Mohib Ali (70).

The grassroots Tabassum movement started on 11 November 2015, when about two to twenty thousand mourners carried the coffins containing the seven bodies to the presidential palace in Kabul, protesting against the lack of security provided by government forces.

== See also ==
- List of kidnappings
