= Murder of Madyson Middleton =

2015 kidnapping and murder of 8-year-old girl in Santa Cruz, California

Madyson Middleton
- Madyson "Maddy" Middleton
- Born: October 5, 2006; Mountain View, California, U.S.
- Died: July 26, 2015 (aged 8); Santa Cruz, California, U.S.
- Cause of death: Positional asphyxia and stab wounds to neck
- Body discovered: July 27, 2015

Madyson Middleton was an 8-year-old American girl from Santa Cruz, California, whose mother reported her missing from their housing apartment complex on July 26, 2015. Middleton had been lured into another apartment by a 15-year-old neighbor where she was strangled, sexually assaulted, and stabbed before being disposed of in a dumpster. The neighbor, Adrian Jerry Gonzalez, was arrested two days later after Middleton's body was found.

In 2019 the California State Legislature passed, and in 2021 the state Supreme Court upheld SB 1391 which prohibits 14- and 15-year-olds from being prosecuted as adults. As a result, in April 2021, Gonzalez was sentenced to juvenile detention where he remains incarcerated, whereas if he had been prosecuted as an adult he could have faced life in prison. Upon turning 25 in 2024, Gonzalez was eligible for release, but a jury trial determined that he would still pose a danger if released.

== Suspect ==
The suspect, identified as Adrian Gonzalez, was 15 years old at the time and lived in the same apartment complex, was charged with Middleton's murder. He confessed to duct-taping her mouth shut and sexually assaulting her before stabbing her in the neck and strangling her to death. Gonzalez then dumped her body and watched the case closely, even asking random police officers questions about the crime. He also had a unique obsession with yo-yos and writing "suicidal" posts on Instagram.

== Trial ==
Gonzalez was charged with murder, kidnapping, and four sexual-assault-related offenses. He was originally charged as an adult and pleaded not guilty as trial began in November 2017. There were some controversies about prosecuting Gonzalez as an adult because he was 15 years old when he committed the murder. California Proposition 57, passed in 2016, allows a judge to decide if juveniles can be prosecuted as adults. However, in 2019 the legislature passed, and the state Supreme Court in 2021 upheld SB 1391 which prohibits 14- and 15-year-olds from being prosecuted as adults. As a result, in April 2021, Gonzalez was sentenced to juvenile prison where he was to be incarcerated until he turned 25 in 2024, whereas if he had been prosecuted as an adult he could have faced life in prison. Following the closure of the Department of Juvenile Justice in June 2023, he was transferred to a Secure Youth Treatment facility in Sonoma County.

In July 2024, a probable cause hearing was held to determine whether Gonzalez was still a danger to the community, and whether he should remain in custody for two more years. A jury found that he should not be released from custody in February 2025. This extension can be renewed every two years, for offenders who are not deemed rehabilitated.

== See also ==
- List of kidnappings
- Lists of solved missing person cases
- List of murdered American children
