= Shukria Tabassum =

Child victim of the 2015 Zabul massacre

- شکریه تبسم
- Born: 2006; Jaghori, Ghazni, Afghanistan
- Died: 9 November 2015 (aged 9); Zabul, Afghanistan

Shukria Tabassum (Dari: شکریه تبسم) was a Hazara victim killed in the 2015 Zabul massacre in Zabul, Afghanistan. The Tabassum movement was named after her.

== Childhood and murder ==
Shukria Tabassum belonged to the Hazara ethnic group of Afghanistan, and was born in Jaghori District of Ghazni Province. She was the daughter of Ramazan Ali. She was a student who at the age of 9 was kidnapped by the Islamic State – Khorasan Province (ISIS-K) in Afghanistan. During a journey from Jaghori to Quetta, Pakistan all seven ethnic Hazara passengers were captured in the valley of Zabul, Afghanistan.

Tabassum and six other passengers who were kidnapped were later executed. After they were killed, the kidnappers (known as IS members) dropped their bodies in a hospital in Zabul Valley. The other Hazaras received the news and reached to Zabul to collect their bodies.

== Eponymous movement ==
After the execution of all seven kidnap victims, around 20,000 demonstrators gathered in Kabul to protest against government policies and the administration, in a series of protests called the Tabassum movement, named in memory of Shukria Tabassum.

== See also ==
- List of kidnappings
