= Jonathan Dowdall =

Irish politician, convicted of kidnapping

Jonathan Dowdall is a former Sinn Féin councillor on Dublin City Council in Ireland. He came to national prominence due to his involvement in the killing of David Byrne in 2016 and the subsequent criminal investigation.

== Career ==
He founded a business in 2007.

== Membership of Sinn Féin ==
In September 2014 he announced his retirement from his role as councillor, citing health reasons. Mary Lou McDonald described him as "a hard worker who will be missed in his elected role by local constituents". A few days later he claimed that a "small element" in the North Inner City section of the party had spread rumours about him. He had not officially resigned from the council but had quit Sinn Féin.

The following month he announced that he was staying with the party after having a discussion with party figures. In February 2015 he resigned. In late June 2015 he claimed he had been bullied out of Sinn Féin, claims which Mary Lou McDonald disputed on 1 July 2015.

== Abduction of Alexander Hurley ==
In January 2015 Dowdall advertised a BMW motorbike for sale on DoneDeal and was contacted by Alexander Hurley, who made an offer for the bike. Hurley had prior convictions for fraud, and Dowdall found allegations of fraud when researching Hurley.

Dowdall invited Hurley to have dinner on 15 January 2015, but when Hurley arrived at the house he was taken to the garage where he was tied to a chair with cable ties. He was waterboarded and his life and the lives of his family were threatened. The Dowdalls accused him of having stolen a car from someone and demanded that he tell the truth. Jonathan wore a balaclava. There was also a third, unidentified man and a girl who brought a bucket and teatowel and who also videoed the events. The video recordings were found when Garda searched his house in relation to other matters. The ordeal ended at 10pm and Hurley was released at 10:35pm.

Dowdall claimed he was in the IRA, and during Dowdall's trial in 2017, Ms Justice Isobel Kennedy returned judgement in a Newton hearing to accept the allegations of threats and his claim of IRA membership.

=== Trial and sentences ===
Both Jonathan and his father pleaded guilty to falsely imprisoning Hurley on 15 January 2015 at an address in Navan Road, to detaining him without his consent and to threatening to kill him. Dowdall was jailed for 12 years and his father Patrick for eight. Judge Kennedy described the ordeal as "gratuitous, humiliating and degrading".

On 23 April 2018 the Court of Appeal reduced Jonathan's sentence to 10 years imprisonment with the final 25 months suspended and that of his father to 7 years with the final 3 years suspended.

=== Reactions ===
Mary Lou McDonald said after the conviction: "I welcome the conviction of Jonathan Dowdall in court today. The details of the attack perpetrated by him are deeply shocking. Jonathan Dowdall left Sinn Féin some years ago. He subsequently worked with, and supported, a political opponent of Sinn Féin in the Dublin Central Constituency."

== Regency Hotel shooting ==
In April 2021 he was charged with the murder of David Byrne.

Both Dowdall and Gerry Hutch, who was also charged with the murder, claimed in judicial review before the High Court that trial before the Special Criminal Court would be unlawful and a breach of their fundamental rights because the court was acting as a permanent institution after being established on a temporary basis. These were dismissed by Mr Anthony Barr, who ruled that the legislation was neither temporary nor had any temporal limit. Both Dowdall and Hutch sought leave to appeal the High Court decision to the Supreme Court. On 5 May 2022 a panel reserved judgement in both cases. The following day, the court president was told that Dowdall was also appealing Barr's judgement via the appellate court. After a request from counsel for the Attorney General, the case was adjourned until 1 July 2022, pending the Supreme Court decision.

In September 2022 both Jonathan and his father Patrick pleaded guilty to facilitating the murder of David Byrne.

On 3 October 2022 the Special Criminal Court was told that Jonathan Dowdall was willing to be a witness in the Regency shooting trial. The trial was adjourned for a week. Though Dowdall had been convicted of facilitating the murder, the charge of murder against him had been dropped. Dowdall is under Garda protection and is being assessed for the witness protection programme.
