= Gawdat al-Malt =

Egyptian politician

- Occupation: Judge

Gawdat al-Malt (born February 1935, Arabic: جودت الملط) is a retired Egyptian judge and former head of the State Council (Administrative Court) and former chairman of the top public finance and anti-corruption watchdog, the Central Audit Organization (1999 and 2011, Arabic:الجهاز المركزي للمحاسبات).

== Early career ==
Al-Malt had a quiet career as a judge, joining the State Council in 1956, after graduating with a law degree from Alexandria University. He completed his PhD in legal studies from Cairo University in 1967, and rose through the ranks of the State Council becoming a judge in the Higher Administrative Court (1985), vice head of the State Council (1986), and eventually head of the State Council in 1998.

== Head of CAO ==
In 1999, Al-Malt was appointed by of Hosni Mubarak as head of CAO. There his career as a public figure started, where he annually presented the CAO report on the public budget in front of Parliament. In 2005, he criticised the lack of transparency in public accounts obfuscating the deficit, and the high level of public debt.

By 2010, Al-Malt was criticising government policies in his parliamentary address, blaming Prime Minister Ahmed Nazif's government for higher poverty rates (Rising from 20% to 23.4% in two years), as well as out of control inflation (Rising from 5% in 2005 to 16.2% in 2009).

== 2011 Revolution and resignation ==
During a last ditch reshuffle to keep Hosni Mubarak in power in the face of the 2011 Revolution, Al-Malt was falsely reported to have been appointed as Minister of Finance on 31 January 2011 because of his anti-corruption reputation. However, Al-Malt denied the claim, and the post was filled by another person on that day.

Within days of Mubarak's ouster, Al-Malt stated that he had sent Mubarak, his cabinet, and parliament 1000 reports between 2004 and 2010 recording various infractions by the Nazif cabinet including embezzlement of public funds, misuse of state-owned land, and ignoring the public procurement law. A month later, Al-Malt announced that he would be submitting these reports to the attorney general.

However, these reports have never been made public, while Al-Malt was later blamed by a rights organisation for stifling access to information that would allegedly have been vital in prosecuting Mubarak for corruption. This led the anti-corruption group Censors Against Corruption, comprising former and then-current senior members of the CAO, to lodge formal complaints against him with the attorney general.
