= Murders of Nathan O'Brien, Kathryn Liknes, and Alvin Liknes =

Triple homicide in Calgary, Alberta

The murders of Nathan O'Brien, Kathryn Liknes and Alvin Liknes occurred on June 29, 2014. Five-year-old Nathan O'Brien and his grandparents, Kathryn and Alvin Liknes, disappeared from the Liknes' Calgary, Alberta home after what police called a "violent incident." An amber alert was issued for Nathan. The alert was lifted on July 14, 2014, after the arrest of a person in relation to the disappearance. On July 14, 2014, police stated that they believed O'Brien and the Likneses were murdered, although no bodies were recovered. Douglas Garland was charged with two counts of first degree murder in the deaths of the Likneses and a second-degree murder for killing O'Brien. The second degree charge for Nathan O'Brien was upgraded by the court to first degree in May 2015. The initial disappearance led to a large outcry of support from the local community, with the disappearance prompting the longest amber alert in Canadian history as well as one of the most intensive ground searches in Calgary's history. The investigation involved multiple agencies including the Calgary Police Service, RCMP, Canada Border Services Agency, and Crime Stoppers.

== Background ==
Douglas Garland was the brother-in-law of Alvin's son Allen. Prior to the murders he had been convicted for running a meth lab on the rural property he lived on with his parents, and had used the stolen identity of a teenager who died in a car crash in Cardston to evade the law throughout the 1990s. Garland had worked with Alvin and Allen after when he was hired to do wiring for a pump that they were working on. Alvin was an inventor and had patented several designs since the 1970s. Garland had slightly altered the patent they had been working on and believed that he should have been included as one of the inventors, but Liknes disagreed. This, along with Garland being let go in 2007 caused him to develop a grudge against Alvin. When he learned that Alvin was planning on moving away he decided to act on his grudge. Police later found that Garland had searched up incriminating things such as "how to kill without emotion", "force needed for concussion" and "most painful torture". On the day of the murder, 5 year old Nathan O'Brien chose to see his grandparents with his mom over a visit to the zoo. His grandparents, Kathryn and Alvin Liknes had bought a house in Edmonton and were hosting an estate sale on the day. Afterwards, Nathan asked if he could sleep-over at his grandparents to which his mother agreed. Initially his mother and one-year-old brother also stayed, but after the one year old woke up during the night, his mother decided to drive him home leaving Nathan asleep with his grandparents.

== Murder ==
Many of the details of the murders remain unknown as Garland has remained silent since his incarceration. Sometime between Nathan's mother leaving the house and her return, Garland used a drill to access the house through a side door and then disabled the home's router. Alvin was sleeping in the master bedroom and Kathryn and Nathan were sleeping in the front bedroom. Garland attacked the three and beat them until they were incapacitated and bloody. Evidence was presented in court showing that Garland attempted to clean blood off the floor using a mop before dragging the victims to his pickup truck and driving them to his rural property. There he murdered all three victims, likely after extended torture. DNA evidence found on multiple pieces of evidence including a hacksaw, meat hooks, and the shoes Garland was wearing when he was first arrested, matched the three victims. The theory presented by the Crown was that Garland then burned the bodies near his shed to dispose of them.

== Investigation ==
At 10:00 a.m. on the day following the murders, Nathan's mother, Jennifer, called Kathryn, who didn't pick up. Jennifer then went to her parents' house. Upon entering, she discovered the three missing, and saw blood throughout the house. Jennifer called the police and an Amber alert was issued for Nathan at 5:15 p.m. Later that day, police announced that evidence in the house suggested that the disappearances were suspicious. On July 1, aerial imagery taken from a plane flown by Peregrine Aerial Surveys for the city of Airdrie showed two adults, believed to be Alvin and Kathryn Liknes, lying face down in the grass and a small body lying next to them near an outbuilding on Garland's farm. When the farm was flown over again the next day, the bodies were gone. On July 4, police asked for help identifying a green pickup truck seen on multiple CCTV cameras in the area of the Liknes home. Alvin's son Allen and his wife told authorities that the green pickup matched the green Ford F-150 driven by Douglas Garland, leading him to become one of three major suspects in the case. On July 5, police organized a ground search of the area around the Liknes house, one of the largest in Calgary history. That same day the RCMP executed a search of the Airdrie property belonging to Garland and his parents.

During the initial search of the property, a green pickup truck matching the one seen in CCTV footage was found and seized. Douglas Garland was taken in for questioning, and after being released was charged with the identity theft from the 90s, which allowed him to be kept in police custody until July 11 when he was granted bail under the condition he would not return to the rural property. The police search of the Garland property lasted from July 5 to July 20, and the investigation at the Liknes home ended on July 13; in total, police collected upwards of 1,400 pieces of evidence in what was called Operation Amber, the largest number of evidence items collected for a court case in Calgary history. Evidence collected from Garland's farm included a Tyvek suit, face masks, boots, books about disposing of bodies, whips, lockpicking devices, chemical gloves, over fourteen pairs of handcuffs, dental anesthetic, and an assortment of knives, tasers, and other weapons. Eight pairs of women's shoes, two blonde women's wigs, and an adult diaper were also found in the basement of the house; photos of adults in diapers were also found on a hard drive which was hidden in the rafters. A search of the area around the sheds found three blood stains in the grass as well as burned material in the nearby firepit. Evidence found in the firepit included 17 teeth, two of which were thought to belong to a child, bone fragments, pieces of burnt flesh, jewelry, and buttons.

== Arrest ==
On July 14 Douglas Garland drove to his rural Airdrie property in a rental car. Two police vehicles were dispatched to intercept him, but when they reached Garland's car it was parked outside the property. Due to the uneven terrain, police approached on foot, using assistance from a HAWCS helicopter to locate Garland in a thicket before arresting him at 1:25 a.m.

== Trial ==
The murder trial for Garland began on January 16, 2017, and drew to a close on February 16, 2017. Jurors took just over nine hours to reach a verdict of guilty on all three counts of first degree murder.

The following morning, Garland was sentenced, with only the minimum sentence being determined, as first degree murder carries an automatic life sentence. After 10 of the 12 jurors recommended that Garland receive consecutive minimum sentences, Judge David Gates ordered Garland be required to serve 75 years before being eligible for parole. As Garland would have to live to 129 years of age to finish the term, he will effectively be incarcerated for the rest of his life. Throughout the trial, Garland showed no remorse or emotion. Hours after being sentenced, Garland was sent to the Calgary Remand Centre located in the city's northwest, where he was physically assaulted by multiple inmates. EMS said the victim of the assault (Garland) was transported to hospital in stable, non-life-threatening condition, with soft tissue injuries.

== Reactions ==
Upon the announcement of the Liknes family's disappearance, Cenovus Energy, Nathan's parents' employer, sought to finance any ransom for the safe return of the family in the case one was demanded. Hundreds of people volunteered to search for Nathan in the days following the disappearance. On July 15 after the announcement of Garland being charged with the murders, hundreds of Calgarians released green balloons as a tribute to the victims. A Green Ribbon campaign was also started by a neighbour of Alvin and Kathryn Liknes. On July 19 a silent auction fundraiser was held for Nathan's family. On July 23 a vigil was held outside the Alberta Legislature Building in Edmonton. A private memorial by the family was attended by over 200 people. Nathan's parents started the Nathan O'Brien Children's Foundation, which aims to help disadvantaged children. In 2015, a fundraiser game featuring the Calgary Hitmen was held at the Scotiabank Saddledome in Downtown Calgary in Nathan's honour.

== See also ==
- List of murder convictions without a body
- List of people who disappeared mysteriously: post-1970
- Murder of Tori Stafford (another child whose murder in 2009 led to a reworking of Canada's amber alert system)
- Killing of Lyle and Marie McCann
