= HuffPost Arabi =

HuffPost Arabi عربي HuffPost
- Website type: News
- Available in: Arabic
- Headquarters: London, United Kingdom
- Owners: Integral Media Strategies; Huffington Post
- Revenue: N/A
- Website: http://www.huffpostarabi.com/
- Commercial: Yes
- Registration: None
- Launched: 2015
- Current status: Ceased operations 30 March 2018

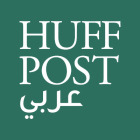
Logo used until 2017

Arabic Post (Arabic: عربي بوست), formerly known as HuffPost Arabi (Arabic: عربي HuffPost), was an Arabic-language news web site founded by Wadah Khanfar, the former CEO of Al Jazeera Media Network in partnership with The Huffington Post. On 30 March 2018, HuffPost Arabi announced that it will no longer be publishing content. Wadah Khanfar later launched a new website called Arabic Post.
