= Killing of captives by the Islamic State =

List of executions by IS

Soldiers and civilians (such as captives and "criminals") have been executed by the Islamic State (IS) by beheading, immolation, shooting, and other means. IS has released a number of propaganda/publicity videos of beheadings or shootings of captives. Houtat Sulūk is reported to be a mass grave.

== List of notable Islamic State executions ==
Victim(s)	Sex(es)	Nationality/ies of victim(s)	Date of execution (approx.)	Place of execution (approx.)	Method(s)	Reason(s)
Sergei Gorbunov	M	Russian	April 2014	Raqqa, Syria	Shooting	Failure to pay ransom
Al-Moutaz Bellah Ibrahim	M	Syrian	May 4, 2014	Raqqa, Syria	Shooting	Participating in the activist group “Raqqa Is Being Slaughtered Silently”
39 Indian migrant workers	M	Indian	June 2014	Mosul, Iraq	Unknown execution method, most likely shooting	Failure to pay ransom
1,095–1,700 Iraqi soldiers	M	Iraqi	June 12, 2014	Tikrit, Iraq	Shooting	Sectarian violence against Shi’ite Muslims in Iraq
Hawas Mallah	M	Syrian	June 14, 2014	Palmyra, Syria	Thrown off a roof and shooting	Homosexuality
Mohammed Salameh	M	Syrian	June 14, 2014	Palmyra, Syria	Thrown off a roof and stoning	Homosexuality
200 Syrian soldiers	M	Syrian	July 16–26, 2014	Palmyra, Syria	Shooting	Revenge against the Syrian regime
James Wright Foley	M	American	August 19, 2014	Raqqa, Syria	Beheading	Retaliation for the American airstrikes against the Islamic State in Iraq
250 Syrian soldiers	M	Syrian	August 27–28, 2014	Tabqa, Syria	Shooting	Revenge against the Syrian regime
Sgt. Ali al-Sayyed	M	Lebanese	August 28, 2014	Arsal, Lebanon	Beheading	To send a message to Lebanon
Steven Joel Sotloff	M	Israeli-American	September 2, 2014	Badiya, Syria	Beheading	Failure to pay ransom and continued American airstrikes against the Islamic State
Sgt. Abbas Medlej	M	Lebanese	September 6, 2014	Arsal, Lebanon	Beheading and shooting	Attempting to escape from Islamic State captors
David Cawthorne Haines	M	British	September 13, 2014	Badiya, Syria	Beheading	Failure to pay ransom and British airstrikes against the Islamic State
Mohammad Hamieh	M	Lebanese	September 19, 2014	Arsal, Lebanon	Shooting	To send a message to Lebanon
Samira Saleh Ali al-Naimi	F	Iraqi	September 22, 2014	Mosul, Iraq	Shooting	Criticizing the destruction of mosques and ancient artifacts, as well as being an “apostate”
Hervé Gourdel	M	French	September 24, 2014	Tikjda, Algeria	Beheading	Retaliation for French airstrikes against the Islamic State
Alan Henning	M	British	October 3, 2014	Badiya, Syria	Beheading	Failure to pay ransom and the continued British airstrikes against the Islamic State
Siraj Ghatish	M	Libyan	November 11, 2014	Derna, Libya	Beheading	To send a message to Libya
Mohamed Battu	M	Libyan	November 11, 2014	Derna, Libya	Beheading	To send a message to Libya
Mohamed al-Mesmari	M	Libyan	November 11, 2014	Derna, Libya	Beheading	To send a message to Libya
Ahmed Muftah el-Nazihi	M	Libyan	November 13, 2014	Derna, Libya	Beheading	To send a message to Libya
Maj. Peter Edward Abdul-Rahman Kassig	M	American	November 16, 2014	Dabiq, Syria	Beheading	Failure to pay ransom and the beginning of American airstrikes against the Islamic State in Syria
1st LT. Muath Safi Yousef al-Kasasbeh	M	Jordanian	January 3, 2015	Raqqa, Syria	Immolation	Failure to pay ransom and in retaliation for Jordanian involvement in “Crusader” airstrikes against the Islamic State in Syria
Dzhambulat Yesenjenovich Mamaev	M	Kazakh	January 15, 2015	Rif Dimashq, Syria	Shooting	Alleged spying for the Federal Security Service
Sergey Nikolayevich Ashimov	M	Russian	January 15, 2015	Rif Dimashq, Syria	Shooting	Alleged spying for the Federal Security Service
Haruna Yukawa	M	Japanese	January 24, 2015	Deir ez-Zor, Syria	Beheading	Failure to pay ransom and to send a message to Japan
Ofc. Hujam Surchi	M	Kurdish	January 28, 2015	Mosul, Iraq	Beheading	To send a message to the Peshmerga and Masoud Barzani
Kenji Goto	M	Japanese	January 31, 2015	Raqqa, Syria	Beheading	Failure to pay ransom and to send another message to Japan
Kayla Jean Mueller	F	American	February 6, 2015	Raqqa, Syria	Unknown execution method, Islamic State incorrectly claimed that she had been killed in a Jordanian airstrike	Failure to pay ransom
1 Ghanaian and 20 Coptic Christians	M	Coptic Egyptian and Ghanaian	February 15, 2015	Tripolitania, Libya	Beheading	To send a message to the Christians and “Crusaders”, also to avenge Camelia Shehata Zakher
Muhammad Said Ismail Musallam	M	Palestinian	March 11, 2015	Raqqa, Syria	Shooting	Alleged spying for Mossad
Mahmoud Khalaf	M	Iraqi	June 17, 2015	Diyala, Iraq	Crucifixion, dismemberment and shooting	Spying for the Peshmerga
Bashir Abduladhim al-Saado	M	Syrian	July 6, 2015	Raqqa, Syria	Shooting	Allegedly participating in the activist group “Raqqa Is Being Slaughtered Silently”
Faisal Hussain al-Habib	M	Syrian	July 6, 2015	Raqqa, Syria	Shooting	Allegedly participating in the activist group “Raqqa Is Being Slaughtered Silently”
Tomislav Salopek	M	Croatian	August 12, 2015	Sinai, Egypt	Beheading	Retaliation for Croatian military intervention in the war against the Islamic State alongside NATO
Mohamed al-Mousa al-Jasim	M	Syrian	August 15, 2015	Raqqa, Syria	Shooting	Participating in the activist group “Raqqa Is Being Slaughtered Silently”
Khaled Mohamad al-Asaad	M	Syrian	August 18, 2015	Palmyra, Syria	Beheading	Protecting “idols” and being an “apostate”
Shamil Bagauddinovich Ibakov	M	Dagestani Russian	September 15, 2015	Buynaksky District, Russia	Shooting	Witness to the prosecution of an Islamic State member
Ashur Piro Abraham	M	Assyrian	September 23, 2015	Al-Hasakah, Syria	Shooting	To send a message to Syria and Christians
Basam Essa Michael	M	Assyrian	September 23, 2015	Al-Hasakah, Syria	Shooting	To send a message to Syria and Christians
Dr. Abdulmasih Enwiya	M	Assyrian	September 23, 2015	Al-Hasakah, Syria	Shooting	To send a message to Syria and Christians
Migitin Amirbekovich Jakatov	M	Dagestani Russian	September 30, 2015	Buynaksky District, Russia	Shooting	Being the mayor of Karamakhi
Saed al-Madani	M	Libyan	October 15, 2015	Sirte, Libya	Beheading	Allegedly practicing sorcery
Adil Ali Hafith	M	Libyan	October 15, 2015	Sirte, Libya	Beheading	Allegedly practicing sorcery
Rushdi Ageela Omran al-Masouri	M	Libyan	October 16, 2015	Derna, Libya	Dragging	Alleged spying for Libya
Muhammad Tayib Ali al-Amri	M	Libyan	October 16, 2015	Derna, Libya	Shooting	Stockpiling weapons in his home
Kuol Gai Owek Ajak	M	Twic Dinka	October 19, 2015	Derna, Libya	Beheading	To send a message to Christians
Faraj Ismael Abd Al-Hammed	M	Libyan	October 19, 2015	Derna, Libya	Shooting	Fighting in the Libyan Armed Forces
Fadi Ammar Zidan	M	Syrian	October 24, 2015	Al-Hasakah, Syria	Ran over with a tank	Running over the bodies of dead Islamic State members with a tank
Seven Hazara Hostages	M/F	Afghani Hazara	November 9, 2015	Zabul, Afghanistan	Exsanguination	To persecute Hazaras and Shi’ite Muslims
Fan Jinghui	M	Chinese	November 18, 2015	Deir ez-Zor, Syria	Shooting	Failure to pay ransom
Ole Johan Grimsgaard-Ofstad	M	Norwegian	November 18, 2015	Deir ez-Zor, Syria	Shooting	Failure to pay ransom
Amjad Mohammed bin Sasi	M	Libyan	December 2015	Sirte, Libya	Shooting	Allegedly insulting God
Yevgeny Yudin "Magomed Khasiev"	M	Russian	December 2, 2015	Raqqa, Syria	Beheading	Spying for the Federal Security Service
Milad Ahmed Abourgheba	M	Libyan	January 16, 2016	Sirte, Libya	Shooting and crucifixion	Fighting alongside Libya Dawn
300+ Iraqi soldiers, law enforcement officers and civil activists	?	Iraqi	February 8, 2016	Mosul, Iraq	Firing squad	To send a message to Iraq
Ayham Hussein	M	Iraqi	February 16, 2016	Mosul, Iraq	Beheading	Listening to Western music
John Bramwell Ridsdel	M	British-Canadian	April 25, 2016	Sulu, Philippines	Beheading	Failure to pay ransom
Abdul-Hadi Eisa Al-Salem	M	Syrian	May 3, 2016	Al-Tabqah, Syria	Stabbing, shooting and crucifixion	Alleged collaboration with coalition forces
Robert Ward Hall	M	Canadian	June 13, 2016	Sulu, Philippines	Beheading	Failure to pay ransom
Magomed Nurbagandovich Nurbagandov	M	Dagestani Russian	July 10, 2016	Sergokala, Russia	Shooting	Being a police officer
Patrick James Almodovar	M	Filipino	August 24, 2016	Indanan, Philippines	Beheading	Failure to pay ransom
300 Iraqi civilians	?	Iraqi	October 28-November 7, 2016	Mosul, Iraq	Unknown execution method	Refusing to join and fight for the Islamic State
Pvt. Sefter Taş	M	Turkish	December 22, 2016	Aleppo, Syria	Immolation	Retaliation for Turkish airstrikes against the Islamic State
Pvt. Fethi Şahin	M	Turkish	December 22, 2016	Aleppo, Syria	Immolation	Retaliation for Turkish airstrikes against the Islamic State
Jürgen Gustav Kantner	M	German	February 27, 2017	Sulu, Philippines	Beheading	Failure to pay ransom
Noel Besconde	M	Filipino	April 13, 2017	Patikul, Philippines	Beheading	Being sick and slowing movements
SSgt. Anni Jani Siraji	M	Tausūg	April 23, 2017	Patikul, Philippines	Beheading	Retaliation for Filipino military intervention
Cpt. Evgeny Viktorovich Petrenko	M	Russian	May 8, 2017	Badiya, Syria	Beheading	Being a Russian intelligence officer
Li Xinheng	M	Chinese	June 8, 2017	Balochistan, Pakistan	Exsanguination	Retaliation for Pakistani military intervention
Meng Lisi	F	Chinese	June 8, 2017	Balochistan, Pakistan	Exsanguination	Retaliation for Pakistani military intervention
Hoàng Trung Thông	M	Vietnamese	July 3, 2017	Basilan, Philippines	Beheading	Failure to pay ransom
Hoàng Văn Hải	M	Vietnamese	July 3, 2017	Basilan, Philippines	Beheading	Failure to pay ransom
Mohsen Hojaji	M	Iranian	August 10, 2017	Iraqi-Syrian border, Iraq	Beheading	To send a message to Iran, “Rafidhis” (Shi’ite Muslims) and “Majusis” (Zoroastrians)
Capt. Azzam Eid	M	Syrian	November 30, 2017	Syria	Immolation	To send a message to Syria
Abdurahim Kituh	M	Filipino	January 5, 2018	Basilan, Philippines	Beheading	Giving information to the Philippine Army
Nadzwa Bahitla	F	Filipino	January 5, 2018	Basilan, Philippines	Beheading	Giving information to the Philippine Army
Muhannad Touqan Abu Ammar	M	Syrian Druze	August 2, 2018	Suwayda, Syria	Beheading	To send a message to Syria
Saifura Hussaini Ahmed Khorsa	F	Nigerian	September 17, 2018	Borno, Nigeria	Shooting	Failure to pay ransom
Tharwat Fadel Abu Ammar	F	Syrian Druze	October 1, 2018	Suwayda, Syria	Shooting	To send a message to Syria
Hauwa Mohammed Liman	F	Nigerian	October 15, 2018	Borno, Nigeria	Shooting	Failure to pay ransom
Louisa Vesterager Jespersen	F	Danish	December 17, 2018	Toubkal, Morocco	Beheading and stabbing	Revenge for the Battle of Hajin
Maren Ueland	F	Norwegian	December 17, 2018	Toubkal, Morocco	Beheading and stabbing	Revenge for the Battle of Hajin
Isnp. Johanna James	M	Hausa	June 11, 2020	Borno, Nigeria	Shooting	To send a message to Nigeria
LCpl. Emmanuel Oscar	M	Nigerian	June 11, 2020	Borno, Nigeria	Shooting	To send a message to Nigeria
Ishaku Yakubu	M	Nigerian	July 22, 2020	Borno, Nigeria	Shooting	To send a message to Nigeria
Luka Filibus	M	Nigerian	July 22, 2020	Borno, Nigeria	Shooting	To send a message to Nigeria
Abdulrahman Dungus	M	Nigerian	July 22, 2020	Borno, Nigeria	Shooting	To send a message to Nigeria
Joseph Prince	M	Nigerian	July 22, 2020	Borno, Nigeria	Shooting	To send a message to Nigeria
Abdur-Rahman Bulama	M	Nigerian	July 22, 2020	Borno, Nigeria	Shooting	To send a message to Nigeria
11 Hazara Shi’ites	M	Pakistani Hazara	January 3, 2021	Machh, Pakistan	Exsanguination and shooting	To persecute Hazaras and Shi’ite Muslims
Mohamed Ibrahim Hamdan	M	Egyptian, Bedouin	April 8, 2021	North Sinai, Egypt	Shooting	Alleged collaboration with Egyptian security forces
Swilam Ahmed Swilam	M	Egyptian, Bedouin	April 8, 2021	North Sinai, Egypt	Shooting	Alleged collaboration with Egyptian security forces
Nabil Habashi Salama	M	Coptic Egyptian	April 17, 2021	North Sinai, Egypt	Shooting	To send a message to Christians
Two Bedouin tribesmen	M	Egyptian, Bedouin	April 17, 2021	North Sinai, Egypt	Shooting	Collaborating with Egyptian security forces
Col. Yasser al-Jourani	M	Iraqi	December 28, 2021	Diyala, Iraq	Beheading	To send a message to Iraq

== Military captives ==
By June 2014, according to United Nations reports, ISIL had killed hundreds of prisoners of war and over 1,000 civilians. Specific incidents involving the killing of military prisoners including the mass killing of up to 250 Syrian Army soldiers near Tabqa Air base, and killings that took place in Camp Speicher (1,095–1,700 Iraqi soldiers shot and "thousands" more "missing") and the Shaer gas field (200 Syrian soldiers shot). ISIL was reported to have beheaded about 100 foreign fighters as deserters who tried to leave Raqqa.

- Muath al-Kasasbeh, a Royal Jordanian Air Force pilot whose F-16 fighter aircraft crashed near Raqqa, Syria, on 24 December 2014 during the international military intervention against ISIL, was captured by ISIL, and on 3 February 2015 released a video showing al-Kasasbeh being burned to death while trapped inside a cage.
- On 22 December 2016, ISIL has released a video showing two captured Turkish soldiers being burned alive.

== Civilian captives ==
Among the known killings of religious and minority group civilians carried out by ISIL are those in the villages and towns of Qiiniyeh (70–90 Yazidis killed), Hardan (60 Yazidis killed), Sinjar (200–500 Yazidis killed), Ramadi Jabal (60–70 Yazidis killed), Dohula (50 Yazidis killed), Khana Sor (100 Yazidis killed), Hardan (250–300 Yazidis killed), al-Shamal (dozens of Yazidis killed), Kocho (400 Yazidis killed and 1,000 abducted), Jadala (14 Yadizis killed) and Beshir (700 Shia Turkmen killed), and others committed near Mosul (670 Shia inmates of the Badush prison killed), and in Tal Afar prison, Iraq (205 Yazidis killed for refusing conversion).

=== Journalists ===
ISIL has tortured and murdered both local and foreign journalists, creating what Reporters Without Borders calls "news blackholes" in areas controlled by ISIL. ISIL fighters have reportedly been given written directions to kill or capture journalists.

- James Wright Foley (October 18, 1973 – c. August 19, 2014) was an American freelance journalist and photojournalist of the Syrian Civil War when he was abducted on November 22, 2012, in northwestern Syria. Foley was the first American citizen to be killed by "Jihadi John". James Foley's beheading by ISIL received wide condemnation in the United States.
- Steven Joel Sotloff (May 11, 1983 – c. September 2, 2014) was an Israeli-American journalist for Time magazine and The Jerusalem Post, although the Post disavowed any relationship once Sotloff's life was threatened. In 2013, he was kidnapped in Aleppo, Syria, and was held captive by Islamic militants. On September 2, 2014, a video was released purporting to show "Jihadi John" beheading Steven Sotloff.
- On January 8, 2015, ISIL members in Libya claimed to have executed Tunisian journalists Sofiene Chourabi and Nadhir Ktari who disappeared in September 2014.
- In January 2015 ISIL threatened to kill two Japanese hostages, Kenji Goto Jogo, a journalist, and Haruna Yukawa (湯川遥菜), a military company operator, unless a ransom of 200 million USD is paid. By the end of the month, the group released another video of the beheading of Goto, in which Jihadi John proclaimed to Japanese prime minister Shinzō Abe "because of your reckless decision to take part in an unwinnable war, this knife will not only slaughter Kenji, but will also carry on and cause carnage wherever your people are found. So let the nightmare for Japan begin."

=== Aid workers ===
ISIL has also murdered aid workers.

- David Haines (May 9, 1970 – c. September 13, 2014) was abducted in March 2013 by ISIL while working in Syria for the humanitarian aid group Agency for Technical Cooperation and Development assessing the Atmeh refugee camp near the Turkish border and the Syrian province of Idlib. A video of the lead-up and aftermath of David Haines' beheading, entitled "A Message to the Allies of America", was released by ISIL on September 13, 2014.
- Hervé Gourdel (September 12, 1959 – c. September 24, 2014) was a French citizen and mountaineering guide. Gourdel was kidnapped on September 21, 2014, while hiking in the Djurdjura National Park in Algeria. The following day, an at the time recently formed ISIL affiliate in Algeria, Jund al-Khilafah, released a video which showed Hervé Gourdel being held hostage. The group threatened to kill Gourdel if the French government continued to conduct airstrikes against ISIL. On September 24, they carried through on threats to behead him after a 24-hour deadline passed. The beheading was captured in a video titled "A Message of Blood for French Government."
- Alan Henning (August 15, 1967 – c. October 3, 2014) was a British humanitarian aid worker. Henning was the fourth Western hostage killed by ISIL. Henning was captured during ISIL's occupation of the Syrian city of Al-Dana in December 2013, where he was helping with humanitarian relief. The British Foreign Office withheld news of Henning's capture while they attempted to negotiate his release. Alan Henning was shown at the end of David Haines's beheading video, released on September 13, 2014, and referred to by "Jihadi John" as the next victim. A video of Henning's beheading was released by ISIL on October 3, 2014.
- Peter Edward Kassig (February 19, 1988 – 2014), also known by the name Abdul-Rahman Kassig which he assumed in captivity, was 26 years old at the time he was beheaded. He was the adopted child of Ed, a school teacher, and Paula Kassig, a nurse. On October 1, 2013, as he was on his way to Deir Ezzour in eastern Syria to deliver food and medical supplies to refugees, Kassig was taken captive by ISIL. While in captivity, Kassig – formerly a Methodist – converted to Islam and changed his name to Abdul-Rahman Kassig, sometime between October and December 2013. On October 3, 2014, his parents released a video in which they stressed that his conversion to Islam was not forced, and that his path to conversion began before he was taken captive. On November 16, 2014, ISIL posted a video showing "Jihadi John" standing over a severed human head. The beheading itself was not shown in the video. The White House later confirmed the person killed was Kassig.
- ISIL claimed that U.S. hostage Kayla Mueller was killed in the Jordanian airstrike on Raqqa on 5 February 2015. However, some experts believe that she may have been killed before the date of the video's release, in order for ISIL to try to drive a wedge between the U.S. and Jordan by blaming her death on the Jordanian airstrikes. Shortly thereafter President Obama confirmed the death of Mueller by ISIL.
- On November 19, 2015, Chinese national Fan Jinghui (樊京辉) and Norwegian national Ole Johan Grimsgaard-Ofstad were murdered by being shot by ISIL, and pictures were released in ISIL's magazine Dabiq.
- On June 8, 2020, four Christian Nigerian aid workers and their security guard, Ishaku Yakubu of Action Against Hunger, Luka Filibus (31) of the International Rescue Committee, Abdulrahman Dungus (28) of the REACH International Initiative, Abdur-Rahman Bulama a camp manager for the State Emergency Management Agency, and Joseph Prince a security guard with the Alje Security Organization were abducted in Borno State, on June 29 a quality of life video was released however 23 days later another video was released showing their execution by firing squad.

== See also ==
- Islamic State beheadings
- Mass executions in Islamic State-occupied Mosul
- Genocide of Christians by the Islamic State
- Yazidi genocide
- Persecution of Shias by the Islamic State
- Abu Azrael
