= Islamic State beheadings =

Form of Islamic State terrorism

The Islamic State (IS) performed beheadings for capital punishment and propaganda purposes. The beheadings received significant worldwide media coverage and attracted widespread condemnation from both governments and Islamic leaders worldwide. IS beheadings peaked in 2014 and 2015—then concentrated in Iraq and the Levant—and steadily declined as the group lost its territories. However, the practice has persisted or appeared in other regions, most notably in Northern Mozambique.

== Background ==
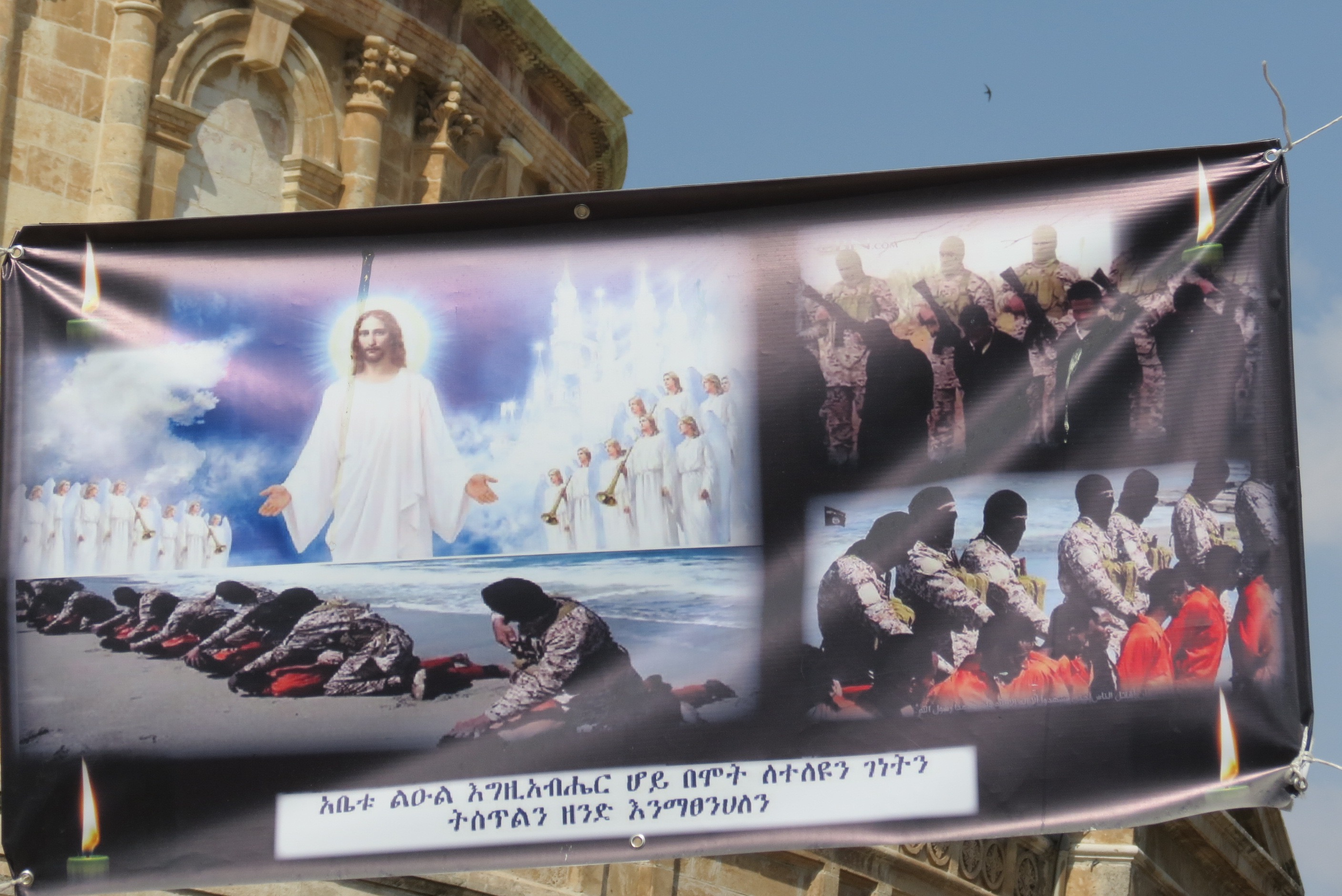
Banner outside the Kidane Mehret Church in Jerusalem, protesting about the 2015 beheading of Ethiopian Christians in Libya.

Decapitation has been a prominent feature in previous conflicts such as the Reign of Terror and in French Algeria. In 2020 the skulls of 24 Algerian martyrs were returned by France, after having been shot and decapitated in the late 19th century. For ISIS, beheadings are a media strategy. The tactic of terror for publicity "propaganda of the deed" was brought to the Middle East by Jewish terrorists in 1940s Palestine. Such as the Irgun, who captured two British Sergeants and hung them in retaliation for the execution of members of their own group. According to historian Ibrahim al-Marashi, modern beheadings as part of terror campaigns began during the war in Chechnya with decapitations of Russian soldiers. The beheading of Daniel Pearl, at the behest of Al-Qaeda in Pakistan, was one of the first to generate worldwide outrage. The antecedents of the Islamic State, led by Abu Musab al-Zarqawi, began "routinised" beheadings after the start of the Iraq War in 2003. Al-Zarqawi's group targeted foreign nationals, most famously Nick Berg, and embarked on a wider campaign of beheadings against captured Muslims. Al-Marashi stated that the motivating factors for these early beheadings were to discourage foreign nations from deploying troops in Iraq, to prevent companies from investing in post-war Iraq, and to intimidate local Muslims. After Barack Obama launched Operation Timber Sycamore to arm Syrian rebels during the Syrian Civil War, Sunni extremist groups dramatically increased their use of beheading as a terror method.

== Use by ISIS (2014 onwards) ==
=== Justifications or reasons for beheadings ===
On 12 August 2014, prior to the 2014–2015 wave of IS beheadings of Westerners and Japanese, IS members sent an email to the family of American hostage James Foley stating that American hostages would be killed in retaliation for:

- the 8 August 2014 beginning of the American-led intervention in northern Iraq;
- U.S. incarceration of Pakistani Muslim woman Aafia Siddiqui;
- the U.S. and its government having "no motivation to deal with the Muslims except with the language of force".

According to historian al-Marashi, IS uses beheadings of locals to intimidate people, including their own soldiers, into obeying the dictates of a weak state. Beheadings of Westerners are designed to strike back at the United Kingdom and the United States for military actions that IS has no other way of responding to. "With an act of a sword, they manage to force both [American President] Obama and [British Prime Minister] Cameron to react. The two men, who control the world's most advanced militaries, find themselves at the mercy of the sword. Both displayed physical pain and grief when they condemned the way their nationals died." says al-Marashi.

"Terror marketing" to recruit new fighters is another motivation, according to Paul Cruickshank, a terrorism analyst for CNN. "Some of these men have sort of a pornographic attraction to these violent scenes, these violent beheading videos. It really sort of energizes them", Cruickshank told The Atlantic. ISIS have also been accused of using beheadings and other shocking videos to distract from military defeats.

== Alleged beheading plots ==
=== Jihadi John ===
Sky News spoke to a defector, from the Islamic State, who claimed he witnessed Mohammed Emwazi, known as Jihadi John, murder Japanese hostage Kenji Goto. He is the only person to admit seeing Emwazi kill. The Islamic State said that Emwazi was employed as the chief killer of foreign hostages.

The Islamic State claimed foreign hostages captured and murdered by the group were subjected to numerous mock executions until the mock procedure became normal, which, it has been suggested, was why many hostages appeared calm in execution videos published online by the group. The Islamic State said the hostages were beheaded later.

=== 2014 Australian counter-terrorism raids ===
In a pre-dawn police raid on 18 September 2014, Australian law enforcement detained 15 individuals in Sydney and Brisbane who were allegedly plotting a "demonstration execution". The detainees' purported plan was to kidnap a random resident of Sydney and behead the individual on camera, draped in the black flag of the Islamic State. The beheading did not occur.

=== Theresa May assassination plot ===
In November 2017, Naa'imur Zakariyah Rahman planned to detonate bombs and behead the then British prime minister Theresa May in the name of Islamic State. He was arrested before he could do so and convicted in 2018.

=== Beheading of a child in Mozambique ===
In March 2021, Save the Children, a UK-based aid group, reported the beheading of a 12-year-old child by IS-linked militants.

== International response ==
U.S. President Barack Obama condemned the actions of the militants, and Jihadi John in particular, and vowed punishment for all the militants responsible behind the videotaped beheadings. Secretary of State John Kerry also called Jihadi John a "coward behind a mask" and, echoing Obama, stated that all those responsible would be held accountable by the United States. British officials have also reiterated their commitment to capturing those responsible for the beheadings. Admiral Alan West, a former UK Security Minister, said that Jihadi John is a "dead man walking" who will be "hunted down like Osama Bin-Laden". British Prime Minister David Cameron also condemned the actions and stated that he was absolutely certain that Jihadi John would "one way or another, face justice". Other figures—such as Justice Secretary Chris Grayling, and Secretary General of Interpol Ronald Noble—also stated that Jihadi John should be brought to justice.

The day after the video of the beheading of Steven Sotloff surfaced, Cameron told the House of Commons: "I am sure the whole House, and the whole country, will join with me in condemning the sickening and brutal murder of another American hostage, and share our shock and anger that it again appears to have been carried out by a British citizen. All our thoughts are with the British hostage and his family. Their ordeal is unimaginable." He concluded: "A country like ours will not be cowed by these barbaric killers. If they think we will weaken in the face of their threats, they are wrong. It will have the opposite effect. We will be more forthright in the defence of the values, liberty under the rule of law, freedom, democracy that we hold dear."

Soon after the David Haines video surfaced, Prime Minister Cameron released a statement on Twitter: "The murder of David Haines is an act of pure evil. My heart goes out to his family who have shown extraordinary courage and fortitude. We will do everything in our power to hunt down these murderers and ensure they face justice, however long it takes."

The White House released this statement via Twitter: "The United States strongly condemns the barbaric murder of UK citizen David Haines by the terrorist group ISIL. Our hearts go out to the family of Mr. Haines and to the people of the United Kingdom. The United States stands shoulder to shoulder tonight with our close friend and ally in grief and resolve. We will work with the United Kingdom and a broad coalition of nations from the region and around the world to bring the perpetrators of this outrageous act to justice, and to degrade and destroy this threat to the people of our countries, the region and the world."

The British Counter Terrorism Internet Referral Unit (CTIRU) has been working to "take extremist material off the internet" and has removed over 28,000 pieces of "unlawful terrorist-related content" between December 2013 and August 2014.

In response to the beheading of journalists James Foley and Steven Sotloff, Agence France-Presse (AFP) released a statement saying that it would "no longer accept work from freelance journalists who travel to places where we ourselves would not venture", including Syria. The Boston-based media company GlobalPost, for whom Foley had been a contributor, released a statement saying, "While we continue to send staff correspondents to Syria, we no longer accept freelance work from that war zone."

Two days after the beheading of Hervé Gourdel, hundreds of Muslims gathered in the Grand Mosque of Paris to show solidarity against the beheading. The protest was led by the leader of the French Council of the Muslim Faith, Dalil Boubakeur, and was joined by thousands of other Muslims around the country. French president François Hollande said Gourdel's beheading was "cowardly" and "cruel", and confirmed that airstrikes would continue against ISIL in Iraq. Hollande also called for three days of national mourning, with flags flown at half-mast throughout the country and said that security would be increased throughout Paris.

== List of confirmed beheadings ==
Event	Date (approx.)	Number killed (approx.)	Description
Syrian soldiers	Jul 25, 2014	75	Photos of the beheadings of a number of Syrian soldiers were posted by IS members to social media on July 25, 2014. The reports said that up to 75 Syrian soldiers from a captured base were beheaded with their heads and bodies displayed along the streets.
James Foley	Aug 19, 2014	1	James Wright Foley (October 18, 1973 – c. August 19, 2014) was an American freelance journalist and photojournalist of the Syrian Civil War when he was abducted on November 22, 2012, in northwestern Syria. Foley was the first American citizen to be killed by "Jihadi John". His beheading by IS received wide condemnation in the United States.
Ali al-Sayyed	Aug 28, 2014	1	Lebanese Army Sergeant Ali al-Sayyed (July 15, 1985 – c. August 28, 2014) was beheaded following his capture by IS during the Battle of Arsal. IS member Abu Musaab Hafid al-Baghdadi posted pictures of the beheading on Twitter. The beheading sparked public outrage in Lebanon. Al-Sayyed's body was delivered to Lebanese authorities on September 1; DNA analysis the following day confirmed his identity. His funeral ceremony was held on September 3, with family, friends, members of the public, comrades, and Lebanese Army Commander Gen. Jean Kahwaji.
Kurdish soldier	Aug 29, 2014	1	An unidentified Kurdish fighter was beheaded following capture. Twenty three other captive soldiers were seen in the video but were not beheaded.
Steven Sotloff	Sep 2, 2014	1	Steven Joel Sotloff (May 11, 1983 – c. September 2, 2014) was an Israeli-American journalist for Time magazine and The Jerusalem Post, although the Post disavowed any relationship once Sotloff's life was threatened. In 2013, he was kidnapped in Aleppo, Syria. On September 2, 2014, a video was released purporting to show "Jihadi John" beheading Sotloff.
Abbas Medlej	Sep 6, 2014	1	Lebanese Army soldier Abbas Medlej is believed to have been beheaded following an attempted escape from his captors, where he fired upon his captors, according to comments made by an IS Leader on the Turkish Anatolia news channel. Abbas Medlej was captured by IS during the Battle of Arsal.
David Haines	Sep 13, 2014	1	David Haines (May 9, 1970 – c. September 13, 2014) was a British aid worker abducted in March 2013 while performing humanitarian aid work in Syria. Haines's family requested that his abduction be kept a secret. The abduction became public when Haines appeared in the purported Sotloff beheading video, being held by "Jihadi John" who threatened that Haines would be the next victim. The UK Foreign Office originally requested the British media to not publish Haines's identity, fearing for his safety, though the international press had published his name. A video of the lead-up to, and aftermath of, David Haines's beheading, entitled "A Message to the Allies of America", was released by IS on September 13, 2014.
Family of Afghan Local Police	Sep 20, 2014	15	On September 20, 2014, local officials in the Ghazni Province of Afghanistan reported that Taliban insurgents from different regions of the country, led by camouflaged men wearing black masks, had captured several villages, set at least 60 homes on fire, killed more than 100 people, and beheaded fifteen family members of local police officers. The masked insurgents reportedly carried the black flag of IS, openly called themselves soldiers of Islamic State, and did not speak any local languages. Deputy Police Chief General Asadullah Ensafi reported that Taliban ambushes stopped reinforcements from the Afghan National Army and provincial police from reaching the area. Afghan commandos inserted by helicopter were able to reinforce units already defending the area and the "immediate threat to district's center had been nullified."
Hervé Gourdel	Sep 24, 2014	1	Hervé Gourdel (September 12, 1959 – c. September 24, 2014) was a French citizen and mountaineering guide. Gourdel was kidnapped on September 21, 2014, while hiking in the Djurdjura National Park in Algeria. The following day, a recently formed IS affiliate in Algeria, Jund al-Khilafah, released a video which showed Hervé Gourdel being held hostage. The group threatened to kill Gourdel if the French government continued to conduct Opération Chammal. On September 24, they carried through on threats to behead him after a 24-hour deadline passed. The beheading was captured in a video titled "A Message of Blood for French Government". The video is similar to other IS beheading videos. It opens with a news clip of French President François Hollande and a title screen. It then shows Hervé Gourdel handcuffed and kneeling in front of four armed masked men. After Gourdel delivers a statement, one of the militants reads a statement. In it he declares that this kidnapping and execution are in response to the order of IS spokesman Abu Mohammad al-Adnani to attack citizens of countries participating in the U.S.-led coalition against the Islamic State. Like the other IS beheading videos, it does not show the actual beheading, but the final scene does show Hervé Gourdel's dead body with his severed head in his lap, and then the fighters holding the head up.
Kobane and Eastern Syria	Oct 1, 2014	10	On October 1, the Syrian Observatory for Human Rights reported that IS had beheaded 10 individuals near Kobane, Syria – two male and three female Kurdish fighters, four Syrian Arab rebels, and a male Kurdish civilian. "I don't know why they were arrested or beheaded. Only the Islamic State knows why. They want to scare people", according to Rami Abdulrahman, who also reported IS has used beheadings in eastern Syria to scare local leaders of Sunni Muslim tribes to withdraw from the battlefield. The beheadings are often carried out in public and the public is told that any violent or non-violent dissent will not be tolerated.
Alan Henning	Oct 3, 2014	1	Alan Henning (August 15, 1967 – c. October 3, 2014) was a British humanitarian aid worker. Henning was the fourth Western hostage killed by IS. Henning was captured during IS's occupation of the Syrian city of Al-Dana in December 2013, where he was helping with humanitarian relief. The British Foreign Office withheld news of Henning's capture while they attempted to negotiate his release. Henning was shown at the end of David Haines's beheading video, released on September 13, 2014, and referred to by "Jihadi John" as the next victim. A video of Henning's beheading was released by IS on October 3, 2014.
Baiji, Iraq	Oct 10, 2014	3	A security official in Baiji said three men were beheaded on October 10, 2014.
Raad al-Azzawi and several others	Oct 11, 2014	5	Reporters Without Borders (RSF) and his family said that on September 7, 2014 IS seized, and on October 11 publicly beheaded, Raad al-Azzawi (or translated Azzaoui), 37, a TV Salaheddin cameraman from the village of Samra, east of Tikrit in Iraq. According to RSF, al-Azzawi was taken because he refused to work for IS. They also kidnapped and killed, possibly also by beheading, al-Azzawi's brother and several other civilians. In December 2013, IS militants had attacked al-Azzawi's TV station with suicide bombs, killing five journalists, after accusing the station of "distorting the image of Iraq's Sunni community". These actions were part of a widespread organized effort to control the press through violence. At about the same time, AP reported that IS beheaded a number of journalists in Syria.
Peter Kassig	Nov 16, 2014	1	Kassig worked in Syria and Lebanon as a humanitarian worker and trained medical assistant. He aided Syrian refugees through Special Emergency Response and Assistance (SERA), a non-governmental organization he founded in the Fall of 2012 to provide refugees in Syria and Lebanon with medical assistance, supplies, clothing, and food. On October 1, 2013, as he was on his way to Deir Ez-Zor in eastern Syria to deliver food and medical supplies to refugees, Kassig was taken captive by IS. He was kept in a cell with French journalist Nicolas Henin and British journalist John Cantlie, and beaten regularly. While in captivity, Kassig – formerly a Methodist – converted to Islam and changed his name to Abdul-Rahman Kassig, sometime between October and December 2013. On October 3, 2014, his parents released a video in which they stressed that his conversion to Islam was not forced, and that his path to conversion began before he was taken captive. Kassig was named as the next victim to be beheaded in the video released by IS on October 3, 2014, which showed Alan Henning's beheading. On October 3, Kassig's family sent a video message to the Islamic State, asking for mercy for their son. Kassig's mother later tweeted an entreaty to the leader of the Islamic State over Twitter, asking to communicate with him; and Kassig's parents maintain Facebook and Twitter accounts. On November 16, 2014, IS posted a video showing "Jihadi John" standing over a severed human head. The beheading itself was not shown in the video. The White House later confirmed the person killed was Kassig. The Telegraph and security expert Will Geddes speculated that Kassig may have defied his captors, and refused to provide a beheading video statement.
Syrian soldiers	Nov 16, 2014	21	On November 16, 2014, in the same video that depicted Peter Kassig's death, IS also included the beheading of 22 Syrian soldiers in gruesome detail. The BBC pointed out that this video "revels in gore"; and, unlike previous videos, this one showed the faces of many of the militants and provided the location as Dabiq in Aleppo Province. On November 17, French media reported that 22-year-old French citizen Maxime Hauchard, who goes by the nom de guerre Abdallah Al-Faransi, was believed to be among the executioners in the beheading video. Hauchard lived in Normandy and converted to Islam at the age of 17. A French prosecutor said that another Frenchman may have also been present. On November 19, 22-year-old Michael Dos Santos, known by fellow militants by his nom de guerre Abou Uthman, was also identified by the French media as the second French jihadist featured in the beheading video. Dos Santos lived in Champigny-sur-Marne, east of Paris, and converted to Islam in 2010.
Alleged beheading of deserters	Dec 2014	100	In December 2014, after some recent military setbacks, IS was reported to have beheaded about 100 foreign fighters who tried to leave Raqqa. A military police had been established in Raqqa to look for fighters who failed to report.
Haruna Yukawa and Kenji Goto	Jan 2015	2	Haruna Yukawa (湯川 遥菜, Yukawa Haruna), born Masayuki Yukawa (湯川 正行, Yukawa Masayuki; April 1972 – c. January 2015), was a Japanese national reported to be beheaded in January 2015. He aspired to become a private military contractor providing protection to Japanese companies in areas of conflict. In April 2014, he was in Syria where he was captured by the Free Syrian Army; Japanese journalist Kenji Goto (後藤 健二, Gotō Kenji; 1967 – c. 31 January 2015) was brought in to interpret, and Goto secured Yukawa's release. Both Yukawa and Goto went back to Japan, but Yukawa soon returned to Syria, where he disappeared after July 2014; IS released a video on YouTube of Yukawa on the ground bleeding. In October 2014, Goto returned to Syria to try to secure Yukawa's release; he was soon captured. The two appeared in a video in January 2015, in which IS gave the Japanese government a deadline of 72 hours for a ransom of $200 million. The deadline passed without fulfillment of the demand, and a video of Yukawa's beheading was released. Yukawa and Goto were the first Japanese nationals to be held hostage by IS. By the end of the month, the group released another video of the beheading of Goto, in which Jihadi John proclaimed to Japanese prime minister Shinzō Abe, "because of your reckless decision to take part in an unwinnable war, this knife will not only slaughter Kenji, but will also carry on and cause carnage wherever your people are found. So let the nightmare for Japan begin."
Hujam Surchi	Jan 28, 2015	1	Hujam Surchi, an Iraqi Kurdish Peshmerga officer, was beheaded days before Kenji Goto, allegedly by a Kurdish member of IS.
Alleged spies in Egypt	Feb 2015	10	In February 2015, in response to the buffer zone the Egyptian government placed along the Gaza–Egypt border, IS members beheaded 10 men they believed were spies for Mossad and the Egyptian Army.
Coptic Egyptians	Feb 15, 2015	21	On February 15, 2015, IS's al-Hayat Media Center posted a video on Twitter titled "a message signed with blood to the nation of the cross". It showed the beheading of 20 Coptic Egyptian and one Ghanaian Christian masons by the sea shore in Tripoli, Libya. They had been kidnapped from Sirte in late December 2014.
Ethiopian Christians	Apr 19, 2015	30	On April 19, 2015, a video purportedly made by Islamic State and posted on social media sites appeared to show militants shooting and beheading two groups of Ethiopian Christians in Libya, totaling about 30 victims.
Tomislav Salopek	Aug 12, 2015	1	On August 12, 2015, a still image, shared by IS sympathizers on social media, showed the apparent body of Croatian Tomislav Salopek, a married, 30-year-old father of two, whose first video containing his captors′ threat and demand that the government of Egypt free imprisoned "Muslim women", was released on August 5, 2015, a day when Croatia was staging victory celebrations to commemorate its independence war. In the new image, Salopek wore a beige jumpsuit looking like the one he had worn in a previous video. A black flag used by IS and a knife were planted in the sand next to his severed body. The Islamic State group's Egyptian affiliate, Sinai Province, claimed the responsibility for the beheading. The picture also contained an inset of two Egyptian newspaper reports, with one headline declaring Croatia's support of Egypt in its war against terrorism and extremism, and another saying Croatia reiterated its support for the Kurdistan region.
Khaled al-Asaad	Aug 18, 2015	1	In May 2015, Tadmur (the modern city of Palmyra) and the adjacent ancient city of Palmyra came under the control of the Islamic State. Al-Asaad, a Syrian archaeologist who was a retired head of antiquities in Palmyra helped evacuate the city museum prior to IS's takeover. He was among those captured during this time, and IS attempted to get al-Asaad to reveal the location of the ancient artifacts that he had helped to hide. Khaled al-Asaad was beheaded in Tadmur on August 18, 2015, aged 81, following non-compliance. His body was reported to have been displayed in Tadmur, and then later in the ancient city of Palmyra. Al-Asaad was accused by IS of being an "apostate"; the group listed his alleged crimes, including representing Syria at "infidel conferences", serving as "the director of idolatry" in Palmyra, visiting Iran, and communicating with a brother in the Syrian security services. His archaeological discoveries and relentless scholarly efforts contributed to the elevation of Palmyra as a UNESCO World Heritage Site in 1980.
Mohsen Hojaji	Aug 10, 2017	1	Mohsen Hojjaji, a fighter from Iran's Islamic Revolutionary Guard Corps, was beheaded days after he was captured by IS in the Syrian Desert.
Mozambican villagers	Nov 2020	50	Militants linked to IS beheaded about 50 villagers in Cabo Delgado Province, Mozambique, as part of a broader insurgency.

== See also ==
- Beheading by Salafi jihadist groups
- Human rights in Islamic State-controlled territory
- Killing of captives by the Islamic State
- Mass executions in Islamic State-occupied Mosul
- Murders of Louisa Vesterager Jespersen and Maren Ueland
- ISIL hostage situation of Japanese citizens (This article contains content from the "ISIS creepy collage grand prix.")
