= Abu Sayyaf beheading incidents =

Terrorist attacks in the Philippines

Abu Sayyaf was a radical Sunni Islamist group that has aggressively attacked civilians since the 1990s. It was notorious for beheading both military and civilian captives, especially when kidnap-for-ransom demands are not met. The victims included Filipinos, as well as foreign nationals. Abu Sayyaf primarily operated in western Mindanao and the Sulu Archipelago of the southern Philippines.

== List of incidents ==
Victims	Date (approx.)	Number killed (approx.)	Description
Filipino Christian schoolchildren, teachers and Catholic priest	April 19, 2000	2	Two of 29 hostages being held captive since March 20, 2000 who are mostly schoolchildren as well as teachers and a Catholic priest are beheaded.
Filipino Christian villagers	August 3, 2001	9	Nine villagers were beheaded after Abu Sayyaf group seized 30 hostages from a Christian village in the island of Basilan.
Guillermo Sobero	June 19, 2001	1	Main article: Dos Palmas kidnappings An American citizen kidnapped from the Dos Palmas Resort, the first foreigner beheaded by the Abu Sayyaf.
Jehovah's Witnesses	August 22, 2002	2	Two Jehovah's Witnesses were kidnapped were beheaded and their heads been dumped into a public market in the southern Philippines. The heads were found in a bag with a note saying "infidels." A Filipino Army Commander said Abu Sayyaf did this because they want "to punish the nonbelievers of Allah".
Philippine Marines	July 11, 2007	14–23	Main article: 2007 Basilan beheading incident 14–23 members of the Philippine Marines were beheaded during an encounter with Abu Sayyaf and Moro Islamic Liberation Front (MILF) rebels in Basilan.
Doroteo Gonzales	May 17, 2009	1	A Filipino farmer kidnapped on April 25 was beheaded on May 17 after his family failed to pay a ransom for his release.
Gabriel Canizares	November 9, 2009	1	On November 9, this Filipino teacher's head was found in a petrol station in Jolo three weeks after being kidnapped by Abu Sayyaf. His body was found on November 11 in Patikul, Sulu. Six other teachers who had also been kidnapped in the same year had all been released despite threats to behead them.
Filipino loggers	June 11, 2010	3	Three men gathering wood near Maluso town on Basilan were abducted on June 11 and later beheaded by Abu Sayyaf militants.
Philippine Marines	July 28, 2011	5	5 out of 7 members of a Philippines Marine unit were beheaded during an encounter with Abu Sayyaf in the jungle of Sulu.
Moro National Liberation Front	February 2, 2013	8	8 members of the Moro National Liberation Front were beheaded by Abu Sayyaf militants during an encounter in Patikul.
Bernard Then	November 17, 2015	1	After being kidnapped by Abu Sayyaf militants from a restaurant in neighboring Sandakan, Sabah on May 15, 2015, Then was brought to Parang, Sulu before being beheaded in Jolo after ransom demands were not met.
John Ridsdel	April 25, 2016	1	An English-born Canadian who was kidnapped by Abu Sayyaf militants from a resort on Samal Island, Philippines on September 21, 2015, he was brought to Jolo together with Robert Hall and beheaded there. His head was found on April 25, 2016.
Robert Hall	June 13, 2016	1	A Canadian kidnapped by Abu Sayyaf militants from a resort on Samal Island, Philippines on September 21, 2015, he was brought to Jolo together with John Ridsdel and beheaded there on June 13, 2016.
Patrick Almodovar	August 24, 2016	1	A Filipino teenager was executed after demands of at least one million dollars in ransom from the victim's family were not met. The beheading of a very young hostage led the Philippines President to order more troops to be sent to combat Abu Sayyaf terrorism.
Philippine Army	August 29, 2016	2	2 Philippine soldiers were beheaded during their encounter with the Abu Sayyaf, while 15 other soldiers were killed in a gunfight.
Jürgen Kantner	February 27, 2017	1	German tourists of Jürgen Kantner and his companion Sabine Merz were abducted from his yacht off Malaysia's Sabah state in November 2016. Merz's body was later found on the boat with gunshot wound. A deadline for 30 million pesos (€566,900; $600,000) in ransom expired on Sunday, February 26, 2017. Kantner was subsequently beheaded.
Noel Besconde	April 16, 2017	1	A captain of four Filipino fishermen was beheaded a year after they were abducted. The victim was beheaded simply because he was sick and was slowing down Abu Sayyaf's movement from place to place during continuous military operation.
Anni Siraji	April 24, 2017	1	A former MNLF member turned Filipino soldier was beheaded after he was abducted a week earlier. The motive for the beheading was believed to be retaliation after three members of the Abu Sayyaf were killed during a continuous military operation in the area.
Hoàng Trung Thông and Hoàng Văn Hải	July 4, 2017	2	Two Vietnamese sailors of the Vietnamese cargo ship Royal 16 who had been kidnapped by Abu Sayyaf in November 2016 were found beheaded in Sumisip town of Basilan.
Filipino loggers	July 30, 2017	7	Seven Filipino loggers who had been kidnapped by Abu Sayyaf on July 20, 2017 were found beheaded in two separate towns of Basilan.
Abdurahim Kituh and Nadzwa Bahitla	January 5, 2018	2	A Filipino couple was found beheaded in a village in Basilan.
Filipino villager	January 17, 2019	1	A Filipino villager was beheaded with his body dumped near the house of the Abu Sayyaf arrested member in a village of Barangay Kajadtian, Sulu after the victim was suspected of giving information to local authorities that leading to their member arrestment in Indanan, Sulu.

== See also ==
- List of terrorist incidents
