= Alan Henning =

English taxicab driver and volunteer humanitarian aid worker

- Born: 15 August 1967; Eccles, Lancashire, England
- Disappeared: December 2013; Al-Dana, Syria
- Died: c. 3 October 2014 (aged 47)
- Cause of death: Murder by beheading
- Occupations: Taxi driver Aid worker
- Spouse: Barbara
- Children: 2

Alan Henning (15 August 1967 – c. 3 October 2014) was an English taxicab driver-turned-volunteer humanitarian aid worker. He became the fourth Western hostage killed by the Islamic State of Iraq and the Levant (ISIL) with his killing publicised in a beheading video.

== Early life ==
Henning was a taxi driver in Eccles, Salford, Greater Manchester, in North West England before he traveled to Syria in December 2013 to volunteer as an aid worker. He lived in Eccles, Greater Manchester with his family. A fundraising page was also set up to help support his family following his death.

He was married to Barbara, and had two children, Lucy and Adam.

== Kidnapping ==
In December 2013, Henning was part of a team of volunteers delivering goods and funds to people affected by Syria's civil war. He was abducted on 26 December 2013 by masked gunmen, according to other people in his aid convoy. Henning was captured during ISIL's occupation of the Syrian city of Al-Dana. Local colleagues had warned Henning not to cross the border into Syria, but he insisted on going to ensure the safe delivery of humanitarian supplies.

At the time of his capture, Henning was working as a driver for the Worcester-based charity Al-Fatiha Global. Henning was shown at the end of David Haines's execution video, released on 13 September 2014, and was referred to as being the next victim by Mohammed Emwazi, who the media described as "Jihadi John" of the ISIL cell known as The Beatles. A video of Henning's beheading was released on 3 October 2014.

The British Foreign Office withheld news of Henning's capture while it attempted to negotiate his release.

In an al-Qaeda magazine interview, spokesman Adam Gadahn condemned the beheading. After his murder, British Prime Minister David Cameron ordered MI5, MI6, and GCHQ to track down and either kill or capture his killer. Emwazi was ultimately killed in an American drone strike in 2015.

== Beheading ==
Alan Henning (left) and Mohammed Emwazi. Frame from the terrorist propaganda video.

A video released on 3 October 2014 shows Henning's apparent beheading. The executioner identified as "Jihadi John" from the ISIL cell known as The Beatles, blamed the execution on the UK's involvement in the U.S.-led bombing campaign against ISIS.

Before the beheading, Henning appears on camera, handcuffed behind his back and in a kneeling position, next to a knife-wielding masked man later identified as Mohammed Emwazi. Henning speaks, referencing the British Parliament's decision to join the coalition of countries, such as the United States, that have banded together to bomb the Islamic State in Iraq and Syria.

The video concludes with a threat to the life of American aid worker Peter Kassig.

== Reactions ==
Prime Minister David Cameron condemned the killing as "absolutely appalling" and "completely unforgivable" and vowed to do everything to defeat ISIL. He described Henning as a man of great peace, kindness and gentleness, saying: "He went with many Muslim friends to do no more than simply help other people. His Muslim friends will be mourning him at this special time of Eid, and the whole country mourns with them."

On 5 October 2014, prayers were said for Henning in churches across Bolton. The Bishop of Bolton Rt Rev Chris Edmondson said: "This is the most horrific, brutal and barbaric act. Leaders of Christian and Muslim faiths have universally condemned this act." Bolton Interfaith Council and Bolton Council of Mosques, which had held a vigil for Henning before news of his death, pledged to continue praying for him.

A special service of remembrance was held at Eccles Parish Church, attended by Henning's widow. A memorial fund was established by friend and fellow aid-worker Shameela Islam-Zulfiqar, with the aim of raising £20,000. By 9 October 2014, £30,000 had been raised by the Muslim community to help support Henning's family. A further memorial service was held on 12 October at the British Muslim Heritage Centre, organised by friends and humanitarian aid colleagues of Henning, attracting over 600 people.

The family of Ken Bigley, who was also a hostage murdered in Iraq by Tawhid al-Jihad (the precursor of ISIS), offered their condolences to Henning's family.

On 7 October, former Guantánamo Bay detainee Moazzam Begg said that he had offered to intervene to help secure Henning's release.

The Salafi Muslims of the UK condemned Henning's murder, stating that ISIS had violated Islam's respect for covenants and had also mistreated Henning and the Muslims captured along with him. They criticised a London-based follower of Omar Bakri, Mizanur Rahman, who had attempted to justify Henning's killing.

In October 2014, Labour MP Barbara Keeley, called for public recognition of Henning's sacrifice, and for support for his widow and children, a request which the prime minister agreed to consider.

In April 2020, an inquiry by the Charity Commission found that Al-Fatiha Global, for whom Henning had been volunteering, had failed in its duty to safeguard him and other volunteers while they were working in Syria. The charity had not provided any training or guidance for those travelling to war zones, and had not notified any British authorities when it learned of Henning's abduction.

== See also ==
- John Cantlie
- James Foley (journalist)
- Steven Sotloff
- 2014 ISIL beheading incidents
