= Killing of David Haines =

British aid worker

David Haines
- Haines (left) and his killer Mohammed Emwazi (right). Frame from the terrorist propaganda video.
- Born: David Cawthorne Haines; 9 May 1970; East Yorkshire, England
- Disappeared: 8 March 2013; Atme, Syria
- Died: c. 13 September 2014 (aged 44); Syrian desert
- Cause of death: Decapitation
- Other name: David
- Citizenship: British
- Occupation: Humanitarian aid worker
- Years active: 1999–2014
- Employer: Aid worker
- Known for: Aid worker
- Children: 2

David Cawthorne Haines (9 May 1970 – c. 13 September 2014) was a British aid worker who was captured by the Islamic State of Iraq and the Levant (ISIL) in early 2013 and beheaded in early September 2014.

== Early life and career ==
Haines was born in East Yorkshire, moving to Perth, Scotland, as a child and prior to his capture resided in Sisak, Croatia, as a father of two. Haines had been an aircraft engineer in the Royal Air Force before turning to work in humanitarian aid in 1999. He helped victims of conflict in the former Yugoslavia, Africa and the Middle East. In 2012, he was an unarmed security worker for Nonviolent Peaceforce, a civilian peacekeeping group in South Sudan.

== Kidnapping ==
Haines was abducted in March 2013 by an unidentified armed gang affiliated with ISIL while working in a Syrian internally displaced persons (IDP) camp run by the aid group Agency for Technical Cooperation and Development (ACTED). He was kidnapped near the Atmeh refugee camp near the Turkish border and the Syrian province of Idlib. He was seized along with an Italian aid worker named Federico Motka. Their Syrian translator and driver were not taken. The translator later said that insurgents shot out the tyres and surrounded their vehicle on a country road.

Haines' family were ordered by UK Foreign Office not to speak to anybody about the abduction, an instruction that continued even after the abduction became public when Haines appeared in the purported Sotloff execution video that threatened Haines would be the next victim. The UK Foreign Office had also requested the British media to not publish Haines' identity, fearing for his safety. When international press published his name after release of the video, UK media decided to also publish it, with The Independent stating that "no purpose is served by continuing to withhold his name".

== Rescue attempt ==
After the surfacing of the Steven Sotloff execution video, UK Foreign Secretary Philip Hammond revealed that the aid worker was one of the intended targets of the American rescue mission. The mission failed reportedly because the jihadist group had moved the hostages prior to the arrival of American commandos. Few details about a second rescue attempt were revealed.

== Appearance in Steven Sotloff video ==
The abduction of the aid worker came to worldwide attention after being shown at the end of the Steven Sotloff execution video. The video was discovered on 2 September 2014 by SITE Intelligence Group, purportedly ahead of its intended release by Al-Furqan Media Productions. The individual was shown with Jihadi John and was declared to be the next possible victim of the militant group Islamic State in Iraq and the Levant (ISIL/ISIS). At the end of the Steven Sotloff beheading video, Jihadi John is shown holding a named British humanitarian aid worker by his orange jumpsuit, saying "We take this opportunity to warn those governments that enter this evil alliance of America against ISIL to back off and leave our people alone."

=== British response ===
The day after the Steven Sotloff execution video surfaced, British prime minister David Cameron told the House of Commons: "I am sure the whole House, and the whole country, will join with me in condemning the sickening and brutal murder of another American hostage, and share our shock and anger that it again appears to have been carried out by a British citizen. All our thoughts are with the British hostage and his family. Their ordeal is unimaginable." He concluded: "A country like ours will not be cowed by these barbaric killers. If they think we will weaken in the face of their threats, they are wrong. It will have the opposite effect. We will be more forthright in the defence of the values, liberty under the rule of law, freedom, democracy that we hold dear."

== Death ==
A video of the lead up and aftermath of Haines' beheading, entitled "A Message to the Allies of America", was released by ISIL on 13 September 2014. The video, following a similar format to the ones for Foley and Sotloff, started with a clip of a press statement by Prime Minister Cameron followed by a title screen. It then showed Haines delivering a prepared speech. (Note: Haines: "My name is David Cawthorne Haines. I would like to declare that I hold you, David Cameron, entirely responsible for my execution. You entered voluntarily into a coalition with the United States against the Islamic State, just as your predecessor Tony Blair did, following a trend amongst our British prime ministers who can't find the courage to say no to the Americans. Unfortunately, it is we the British public that in the end will pay for the price for our parliament's selfish decisions.") Next, the executioner makes a statement, (Note: Executioner: "This British man has to pay the price for your promise, Cameron, to arm the Peshmerga against the Islamic State. Ironically, he has spent a decade of his life serving under the brutal air force that is responsible for delivering those arms. Your evil alliance with America, which continues to strike the Muslims of Iraq and most recently bombed the Haditha Dam, will only accelerate your destruction, and playing the role of the obedient lapdog, Cameron, will only drag you and your people into another bloody and unwinnable war.") then puts his knife to Haines' throat and makes cutting motions as the video fades to black. In the final scene, the executioner is holding the orange jumpsuit of another person, named as British aid worker Alan Henning, saying "If you, Cameron, insist on fighting the Islamic State then you, like your master Obama, will have the blood of your people on your hands."

On 22 October 2016, a memorial for David Haines was unveiled in a garden at Perth railway station. It was dedicated by former colleagues at Abellio ScotRail.

== See also ==
- 2014 American intervention in Iraq
- ISIL beheading incidents
- Beheading in Islamism
- Steven Sotloff
- Foreign hostages in Iraq
- James Foley (journalist)
- Nick Berg
- Kenneth Bigley
- John Cantlie
- Austin Tice
- Daniel Pearl
- The Beatles, terrorist cell of the Islamic State that guarded and beheaded Sotloff
