= 2015 Islamic State killing of Christian migrants in Libya =

Killing of Eritrean and Ethiopian Christians

- Part of the Libyan civil war (2014–2020) and the genocide of Christians by the Islamic State
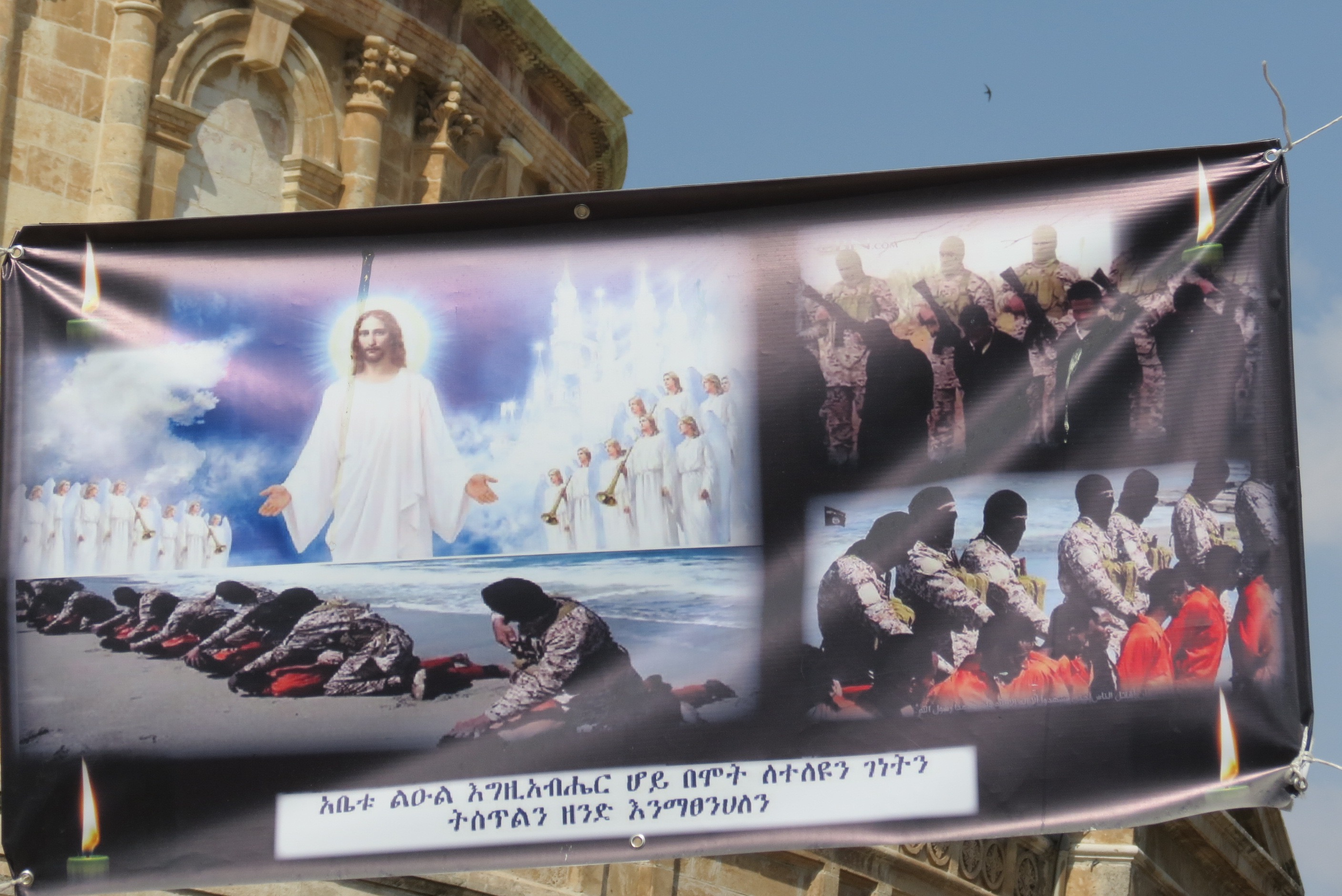
- Banner containing scenes from the video outside of the Kidane Mehret Church in Jerusalem, protesting the killings
- Location: Libya
- Date: 19 April 2015
- Target: Ethiopian and Eritrean Christian migrants
- Attack type: Decapitations, mass shooting
- Deaths: 28–34
- Perpetrator: Islamic State – Libya Province
- Motive: Anti-Christian sentiment

On 19 April 2015, a video was released by the Islamic State's Libyan branch depicting the shooting and beheading of two groups of Christian migrant workers held hundreds of miles apart. A group of around 12 captives were held on the coast in eastern Libya, while the other group of around 16 was held in a desert. The video threatened the killing of Christians who did not convert to Islam or pay jizya. Of the approximately 30 victims shown in the video, the majority were Ethiopian, but at least seven were from Eritrea. The Islamic State labeled the victims as members of the Ethiopian Orthodox Tewahedo Church.

== Background ==
The Islamic State (IS), an Islamist militant group, was established from al-Qaeda in Iraq. A self-proclaimed caliphate, the group controlled a third of the territory of Iraq and Syria by 2015. In August 2014, it led an offensive in northern Iraq that forced thousands of Christians to flee the Nineveh Plains to avoid persecution. Iraq's Yazidi minority was the target of an ethnic cleansing campaign by IS that led to thousands of deaths from mass starvation, enslavement, and massacres. The militant group destroyed a large amount of Assyrian, Shia, and Christian cultural heritage in Iraq. IS took advantage of political instability following the killing of Muammar Gaddafi in order to gain a foothold in Libya. Since then, its affiliates have claimed several attacks on foreigners in the country, including the 2015 Corinthia Hotel attack.

IS utilized social media in order to recruit Muslims worldwide. The group has published propaganda videos featuring the killing of captives, such as the burning of Jordanian pilot Muath al-Kasasbeh and the beheading of American journalist James Foley. In February 2015, IS published a video showing the beheading of 21 Egyptian Coptic Christians in Libya, prompting retaliatory Egyptian airstrikes.

== Video ==
The 29-minute video was titled "Until There Came to Them Clear Evidence". (Note: Arabic: حتى تأتيهم البينة) It was released on IS-affiliated websites and social media profiles on 19 April 2015 and bore the icon of Al Furqan Media Foundation, the group's media branch. It features what was described by American magazine Time as "action movie-style editing and shock-value symbolism" akin to other propaganda videos by the militant group.

The video begins with a 25-minute segment of scenes filmed in Iraq and Syria purportedly showing the history of relations between Christians and Muslims, narrated by IS cleric Sheikh Abu Malik Anas al-Nashwan, (Note: also spelled as Abu Malik Anas An-Nashwan.) likely speaking from northern Syria. After examining a portrait of Jesus from the Quran, al Nashwan briefly discusses the formation of the Protestant, Catholic, and Eastern Orthodox denominations of Christianity. The video then shows visuals, apparently from a historical drama, of medieval Muslim fighters marching and attacking a castle, before cutting to a scene of IS leader Abu Bakr al-Baghdadi climbing the minbar of the Great Mosque of al-Nuri, Mosul. Al-Nashwan denounces the Trinity as apostasy and declares that Christians, who he describes as infidels, must either pay jizya (a tax levied on non-Muslims by early Muslim caliphates) or be killed. He asserts that Christians from Raqqa, Syria, had refused to convert to Islam but have instead paid jizya, and the video shows interviews of Christians in territory under the militia's control, including Aleppo and Raqqa, who say that they live in safety. Al-Nashwan then justifies the expulsion of Iraqi Christians as a form of mercy, claiming that they refused to pay jizya or negotiate with IS representatives.

The video cuts to footage of IS fighters destroying churches, gravestones, and other Christian symbols, including crosses and portraits of Mary, mother of Jesus, before proceeding to footage of the captives, who are held in two separate groups hundreds of miles apart. The first group, held by an IS affiliate named Barqa Province in eastern Libya, contains around a dozen men in orange jumpsuits on the coast. The second group of around 16 prisoners dressed in black, held in the desert by a southern Libya affiliate named Fazzan Province, is shown kneeling in front of 16 gunmen holding rifles to their heads. A caption labels the captives as "followers of the cross from the enemy Ethiopian Church". (Note: Arabic: رعايا الصليب من أتباع الكنيسة الإثيوبية المحاربة) One of the gunmen, who is masked and dressed in black, points his pistol at the camera and states:

All praise be to Allah, the Lord and cherisher of the world and may peace and blessings be upon the Prophet Mohammed. To the nation of the cross, we are back again on the sands, where the companions of the Prophet, peace be upon him, have stepped on before, telling you: Muslim blood that was shed under the hands of your religion is not cheap. In fact, their blood is the purest blood because there is a nation behind them [which] inherits revenge. And we swear to Allah: the one who disgraced you by our hands, you will not have safety, even in your dreams, until you embrace Islam.

The gunman quotes Muhammad, stating that the Prophet would protect people who "perform prayer and pay alms" unless commanded otherwise by Islam, before claiming that IS' fight was "between faith and blasphemy, between truth and falsehood", and would continue until the elimination of "polytheism" and complete submission to Allah.

The video then alternates between footage of captives in the first group being individually beheaded, having their blood drained into the Mediterranean Sea, and prisoners in the second group being shot in the head at point-blank range. The video concludes with al-Nashwan saying:

We tell Christians everywhere that the Islamic State will spread, God willing. It will reach you even if you are in fortresses. Those who embrace Islam or jizya will be safe. But those who refuse ... will have nothing from us but the edge of the sword. The men will be killed, the women and children enslaved, and the money seized. That is Allah and the prophet's judgment.

== Victims ==
The victims were Christian migrant workers likely attempting to immigrate to Europe. According to the Ethiopian government, 30 of the dead were its citizens. Only two of the men were named—identified as Eyasu Yikunoamlak and Balcha Belete by relatives. They hailed from Kirkos and entered Libya through Sudan, hoping to take a boat to Italy before reaching the United Kingdom. At least seven victims were Eritrean, three of whom were asylum seekers deported from Israel in 2014, according to the Hotline for Refugees and Migrants. An anonymous blogger told Radio France Internationale that eight victims were Ethiopian-born Eritreans. One of the three Eritrean asylum seekers was identified as a former Eritrean soldier Tesfai Kidane.

On 24 December 2018, the Libyan Criminal Investigation Department announced that it discovered a mass grave containing the remains of 34 men executed in the video, using information obtained from interrogations of detained IS militants. The mass grave was apparently situated on a farm in Sirte, according to drone photos. After being exhumed, the bodies were set to be repatriated to Ethiopia.

== Reactions ==
=== Ethiopia ===
Before the victims were identified as Ethiopian citizens, government spokesperson Redwan Hussien condemned the executions, "whether [the victims] are Ethiopians or not". After their citizenship was confirmed, the government released a statement reading "The Ethiopian government is deeply saddened by the barbarous act committed against our innocent nationals", and a national mourning period of three days was declared starting on 22 April, during which flags were flown at half-mast.

The Ethiopian Catholic Church held a Mass for the victims, and several religious figures condemned the killings, including Archbishop of Addis Ababa Berhaneyesus Demerew Souraphiel, Patriarch of the Ethiopian Orthodox Tewahedo Church Abune Mathias, and President of the Ethiopian Islamic Affairs Supreme Council Mohammed Amin. The Holy Synod of the Ethiopian Orthodox Tewahedo Church passed a decision to annually commemorate the victims and designate them as "Ethiopian Martyrs in the land of Egypt".

On 22 April, around 100,000 demonstrators participated in a government-led protest against the killings in Meskel Square, Addis Ababa. Prime Minister Hailemariam Desalegn, who spoke at the rally, said: "This week's cruel act which was committed against our citizens in Libya not only gives a glimpse into terrorism, but also shows the Satanic acts and objectives of those who committed the act", while also urging his citizens to resist "home-grown extremism" and warning against illegal migration through the Sahara. During the rally, anti-government protesters threw stones at police, who responded with tear gas. Over 100 people were detained, and some demonstrators were hospitalized.

=== International ===
Libyan foreign minister Mohammed al-Dairi said that he was "appalled" by the "barbaric killing" and requested assistance from the international community in his country’s fight against terrorism. A White House spokeswoman condemned the killings, saying, "That these terrorists killed these men solely because of their faith lays bare the terrorists' vicious senseless brutality", and also urged for a political settlement in Libya and a rejection of terrorism. French President François Hollande expressed outrage over the killings and called for a national peace deal to restore stability in Libya. Statements were also issued by the foreign ministries of Algeria, the Czech Republic, Greece, Japan, Russia, Spain, and Turkey.

Pope Francis denounced the "continuing martyrdom" of Christians by IS and expressed sadness and distress over the killings in a message to Abune Mathias. The African Union, European Union, and United Nations also released statements condemning the killings.

== See also ==
- Islamic State beheadings
