= Killing of Peter Kassig =

American aid worker

Peter Kassig
- Born: Peter Edward Kassig; February 19, 1988; Indianapolis, Indiana, U.S.
- Disappeared: October 1, 2013; Deir Ezzour, Syria
- Died: c. November 16, 2014 (aged 26); Dabiq, Syria
- Cause of death: Murder by beheading
- Occupation: Aid worker

Peter Edward Kassig (February 19, 1988 – c. November 16, 2014), also known as Abdul-Rahman Kassig, was an American aid worker who was beheaded by the Islamic State of Iraq and the Levant.

== Early life and education ==
Kassig was born and raised in Indianapolis, Indiana. As a child, he was adopted by Ed, a school teacher, and Paula Kassig, a nurse. Kassig attended North Central High School in Indianapolis, graduating in 2006. After his medical discharge from the Army in 2007, Kassig was a student at Hanover College from 2007 to 2009 and Butler University from 2011 to 2012.

== Career ==
After graduating from high school, Kassig enlisted in the United States Army, becoming a U.S. Army Ranger, serving in the 1st Battalion, 75th Ranger Regiment, a special operations unit, from June 2006 to September 2007. His service including training in Fort Benning, Georgia, and a four-month deployment to Iraq, from April to July 2007, when he received a medical discharge.

Kassig next worked in Syria and Lebanon as a humanitarian worker. He aided Syrian refugees through Special Emergency Response and Assistance (SERA), a non-governmental organization he founded in the Fall of 2012 to provide refugees in Syria and Lebanon with medical assistance, supplies, clothing, and food. Kassig was a trained medical assistant.

== Kidnapping and death ==
Peter Kassig (left) and his killer Mohammed Emwazi from the terrorist propaganda video uploaded by IS

On October 1, 2013, as he was on his way to Deir Ezzour in eastern Syria to deliver food and medical supplies to refugees, Kassig was taken captive by ISIL. He was kept in a cell with French journalist Nicolas Hénin and British journalist John Cantlie, and beaten regularly. While in captivity, Kassig – formerly a Methodist – converted to Islam and changed his name to Abdul-Rahman Kassig, sometime between October and December 2013. On October 3, 2014, his parents released a video in which they stressed that his conversion to Islam was not forced, and that his path to conversion began before he was taken captive.

Kassig was named as the next victim to be beheaded in the video released by ISIL on October 3, 2014, that showed Alan Henning's beheading. On October 3, his family sent a video message to the Islamic State, asking for mercy for their son. Kassig's mother later tweeted an entreaty to the leader of the Islamic State over Twitter, asking to communicate with him, and Kassig's parents maintained Facebook and Twitter accounts.

On November 16, 2014, ISIL posted a video showing "Jihadi John" standing over a severed human head. The beheading itself was not shown in the video. The White House later confirmed the person killed was Kassig. The Daily Telegraph and the security expert Will Geddes speculated that Kassig may have defied his captors, and refused to provide a beheading video statement. In an al-Qaeda magazine interview, spokesman Adam Yahiye Gadahn condemned the beheading.

On December 2, 2018, the US-led anti-ISIL Coalition killed Abu al-Umarayn, an ISIL leader involved in Kassig's beheading, in a drone strike in the Syrian Desert.

== See also ==
- Killing of captives by ISIL
- Beheading in Islam
