= Kenji Goto =

Japanese freelance journalist

- 後藤 健二
- Born: 23 October 1967; Sendai, Miyagi Prefecture, Japan
- Died: 31 January 2015 (aged 47); Near Raqqa, Syria
- Cause of death: Murder by decapitation
- Education: Hosei University
- Occupation: Journalist
- Years active: 1991–2015
- Spouse: Rinko Jogo
- Children: 3
- Parent: Junko Ishido (mother)

Kenji Goto (後藤 健二, Gotō Kenji; 23 October 1967 – c. 31 January 2015) was a Japanese freelance video journalist covering wars and conflicts, refugees, poverty, AIDS, and child education around the world. In October 2014, he was captured and held hostage by Islamic State (IS) militants after entering Syria in the hopes of rescuing Japanese hostage Haruna Yukawa. On 31 January 2015, he was beheaded by his captors led by Kuwaiti-British militant Jihadi John following the breakdown of negotiations for his release.

== Biography ==
Goto was born on 23 October 1967 in the city of Sendai, Miyagi Prefecture, Japan. After graduating from Hosei University in Tokyo in 1991, he worked for a media production company before establishing Independent Press in 1996. He also worked with U.N. organizations including UNICEF and the U.N. Refugee Agency.

Reporting from war-torn countries around the world, especially in Africa and the Middle East, he focused on the life and humanity of the ordinary citizens in difficult times. His works include books and DVDs on blood diamonds and child soldiers in Sierra Leone, the Rwandan conflict and its survivors, a teenage mother in an Estonian "AIDS village", and girls and education in Afghanistan. In 2006, he won the Sankei Children's Book Award for his 2005 book titled Daiyamondo yori Heiwa ga Hoshii (I Want Peace Rather Than a Diamond). His video reports appeared on Japanese national networks including NHK and TV Asahi.

Goto converted to Christianity in 1997, and was a member of a United Church of Christ in Japan parish in Den-en-chōfu, Tokyo.

In October 2014, Goto's wife, Rinko Jogo, had a baby, the couple's second child. He also had an older daughter from a previous marriage.

== Kidnapping and beheading ==
Despite being warned three times by the Japanese government in September and October 2014, both by telephone and in person, not to return to Syria, Goto entered Syria on 24 October 2014 via Turkey to rescue a Japanese hostage, Haruna Yukawa, who had been captured by IS militants in August. He was reportedly captured by IS members the following day. He appeared in a video released by IS militants on 20 January 2015, in which they demanded $200 million from the government of Japan for the lives of Goto and Yukawa. His mother, Junko Ishidō (石堂 順子, Ishidō Junko), made a plea to IS to spare her son at a press conference held at the Foreign Correspondents' Club of Japan in Tokyo on 23 January.

On 24 January, IS released a picture of Goto holding a photo of decapitated Haruna Yukawa. In an audiotape accompanying the picture, Goto read a message in English blaming the Japanese government for the death of his "cellmate" and claiming that IS would spare Goto's life and exchange him for Sajida Mubarak Atrous al-Rishawi, an attempted suicide bomber who participated in the 2005 Amman bombings. On 29 January, Goto's wife, Rinko Jogo, released a plea to his captors through the Rory Peck Trust, a UK-based organization that supports freelance journalists.

On 31 January 2015, IS released a video that showed Goto being beheaded. It was later reported that he had been moved to the town of Tal Abyad near the Turkish border with Syria on 29 January in preparation for a possible exchange with al-Rishawi, but when it became apparent that the exchange would not be taking place, he was taken back to a location near the city of Raqqa in Syria, and killed on the morning of 30 January, local time. Al-Rishawi for her part was hanged by the Jordanian government on 5 February in response to the death of pilot Muath Al-Kasasbeh.

== Media coverage ==
Following the release of Goto's beheading video by IS on 31 January, many major Japanese television outlets, including NHK, Nippon Television, TBS, Fuji Television, and TV Asahi, suspended their normal programming schedules to provide breaking news coverage on this event. Some foreign media outlets noted a rather skeptical and critical response by the Japanese public regarding the two hostages.

The Japanese public responded in a similar way to three Japanese citizens who were also taken hostage in Iraq. Public outrage of their naivety compelled the Japanese government to bill them for their return airfare to Japan after their release. The general public sentiment in Japan towards these hostages has been that they are to be blamed for putting themselves deliberately in harm's way, while the Japanese government and taxpayers are pressured to pay the price to get them back.

== Remembrance ==
Before Goto was murdered, a tweet he posted to Twitter in 2010 went viral. As of 8 February 2015, it had been re-tweeted more than 40,000 times. In it, Goto said, "Close your eyes. Bear it. If we become angry and yell, we are doomed. This is like prayer. Hate is not what humans should do. Judgement lies with God. That is what I learned from my Arab brothers." (目を閉じて、じっと我慢。怒ったら、怒鳴ったら、終わり。それは祈りに近い。憎むは人の業にあらず、裁きは神の領域。－そう教えてくれたのはアラブの兄弟たちだった。)

== Bibliography ==
- Daiyamondo yori Heiwa ga Hoshii: Kodomo Heishi Muria no Kokuhaku (ダイヤモンドより平和がほしい : 子ども兵士・ムリアの告白; English translation: We Want Peace Not Diamonds: A Confession by Child Soldier Muria) (July 2005, Choubunsha Publishing), ISBN 9784811380018
- Eizu no Mura ni Umarete: Inochi o Tsunagu 16-sai no Haha Natasha (エイズの村に生まれて : 命をつなぐ16歳の母・ナターシャ; English translation: Born in an AIDS Village: 16-year-old Mother Natasha Trying to Stay Alive) (December 2007, Choubunsha Publishing), ISBN 9784811384740
- Ruwanda no Inori: Naisen o Ikinobita Kazoku no Monogatari (ルワンダの祈り : 内戦を生きのびた家族の物語; English translation: Prayers of Rwanda: The Story of a Family Surviving Civil War) (December 2008, Choubunsha Publishing), ISBN 9784811384979
- Moshimo Gakkō ni Iketara: Afuganisutan no Shōjo Mariamu no Monogatari (もしも学校に行けたら : アフガニスタンの少女・マリアムの物語; English translation: If I Could Go to School: The Story of Afghanistan Girl Mariam) (December 2009, Choubunsha Publishing), ISBN 9784811386119

== See also ==
- ISIL beheading incidents
- Shosei Koda, a Japanese citizen kidnapped and beheaded in Iraq in 2004
- Notable Japanese Christians
- List of Christian martyrs
