= Ali al-Sayyed =

Lebanese Armed Forces Sergeant (1985–2014)

Ali Al-Sayyed
- Born: July 15, 1985; Fneidik, Akkar, Lebanon
- Died: c. August 28, 2014 (aged 29); Arsal, Lebanon
- Cause of death: Beheading by ISIL
- Burial place: Fneidik, Akkar, Lebanon
- Relatives: Rahaf (Daughter)
- Military career
- Allegiance: Lebanon
- Branch: Lebanese Armed Forces
- Service years: 4 September 2006 – 28 August 2014
- Rank: Sergeant/Raqeeb
- Unit: 8th Infantry Brigade
- Conflicts: Battle of Arsal; Syrian Civil War spillover in Lebanon

Ali Al-Sayyed (Arabic: علي السيد; 15 July 1985 – c. 28 August 2014) was a Lebanese soldier in the Lebanese Armed Forces (LAF; National Army) from 2006 to 2014. Al Sayyed was born into a Lebanese, Sunni family in the village of Fneidik, Akkar, Lebanon. He volunteered to join the Army on 4 September 2006, and served until his death on 28 August 2014; obtaining the rank of sergeant.

== Capture and death ==
Ali al-Sayyed was beheaded following his capture by ISIL during the Battle of Arsal. ISIL member Abu Musaab Hafid al-Baghdadi posted pictures of the beheading on Twitter. The beheading sparked public outrage in Lebanon. Al-Sayyed's body was delivered to Lebanese authorities on September 1, and his identity was confirmed through DNA tests on September 2. His funeral ceremony was held on September 3, with family, friends, members of the public, comrades, and Lebanese Army Commander Gen. Jean Kahwaji.
