= Naa'imur Zakariyah Rahman =

Islamic State terrorist (born 1997)

- নাঈমুর জাকারিয়া রহমান
- Born: 23 July 1997 (age 29)
- Citizenship: British
- Known for: Attempted assassination of Theresa May
- Status: Incarcerated
- Allegiance: ISIS
- Criminal charges: Terrorism; Assisting preparation of terrorist acts; Conspiracy to commit terrorism
- Penalty: Life sentence for conspiracy to commit terrorism (Minimum of 30 years); 6 years for preparation of terrorist acts

Naa'imur Zakariyah Rahman (born 23 July 1997) is an Islamic State terrorist who was convicted of plotting to kill Theresa May, the then-British prime minister; the plot was investigated by Counter Terrorism Command (CTC), part of the Metropolitan Police, under the name 'Operation Dowl'. Mark Heywood QC represented the Crown in this case involving the plot by two individuals to kill the Prime Minister. Rahman was originally from Birmingham, but lived in Finchley at the time of his sentencing. Rahman had planned to detonate bombs at the gates of Downing Street and then behead the Prime Minister, but was arrested beforehand due to an FBI and MI5 operation.

Rahman was arrested in November 2017 in London, after collecting a fake bomb and suicide vest from undercover operatives. He was found guilty at the Old Bailey in July 2018 of conspiracy to commit terrorism and creating extremist material for recruitment purposes. In August 2018, he was given a life sentence and jailed for at least 30 years, with another 6 year sentence for the sponsorship video. The sentences will run concurrently.

== Personal background ==
Rahman was originally from Birmingham of Bangladeshi descent, but grew up in Walsall. In 2017, Rahman was made homeless in London after falling out with his mother and close relatives. He lived in Finchley at the time of his arrest.

In 2015, he was referred to a deradicalisation scheme amid concerns he could be radicalised by his extremist uncle, Musadikur Rohaman. Rohaman left the UK for Syria in 2014 and had been encouraging Rahman to engage in extremist activity. Rohaman was killed in a drone strike in June 2017, and it is believed that Rahman planned his revenge thereafter.

== August 2017 arrest ==
Rahman first came to police attention in August 2017, when he was arrested on suspicion of sending indecent images to underage girls. He was not charged, but police became aware of extremist material after searching his phone.

== Theresa May assassination attempt ==
In September 2017, Rahman made contact with an FBI agent on social media, believing him to be an Islamic State recruiter. He was then referred to a team of MI5 role players, who convinced him they were Islamic State leaders. The team then introduced Rahman to an undercover police officer in London posing as "Shaq", a weapons fixer. When meeting the officer, Rahman explained his aspirations and considered attacking with firearms and a truck bomb. He settled for storming Downing Street and killing Theresa May.

In November 2017, Rahman met with and laid out his final plan to the undercover officer. The recording of the meeting was played in court:

I wanna drop a bag at the gate, so the gate blows up a bit and I can go through and then like, make a run, like I was thinking taking a human hostage until I get to the actual door. Grab a human shield and then once I get close enough to the door, I'll do what I can with them to get inside.

On 18 November 2017, Rahman carried out reconnaissance around Whitehall. Two days later he bought a rucksack from Argos, and then met with an undercover officer in Brixton to have it and a jacket fitted with explosives.

On 28 November 2017, the officer met with Rahman in Kensington and returned the jacket and bag with fake explosives. Rahman then left the scene, stating that he was "good to go". Within moments, he was surrounded by police and arrested.

== Islamic State sponsorship video ==
On or before 28 November 2017, Rahman recorded a "sponsorship video" for his friend Mohammad Aqib Imran to help him join Islamic State in Syria. In February 2019, Imran was sentenced to eight-and-a-half years in prison.

== Trial ==
Rahman was held in HM Prison Belmarsh before his trial. On 4 May 2018, he appeared at the Old Bailey through videolink before Mr Justice Haddon-Cave, entering a not-guilty plea to terrorism charges.

The trial began on 18 June 2018 and lasted less than one day. The defending lawyer argued that Rahman had been "brainwashed" by his uncle and that he had never intended to go through with the "fantasy" assassination. However, a probation report read by the judge revealed that Rahman had admitted he would have carried out the attack if he had been able to. Mr Justice Haddon-Cave told him he "would have plenty time to study the Koran [Quran] in prison" and that "Islam is a religion of peace", similar to what he said at the trial of the Parsons Green tube bomber.

During the trial, Rahman pleaded guilty to the separate charge of "engaging in conduct which assisted the preparation of terrorist acts", relating to the sponsorship video he filmed for Mohammad Aqib Imran.

In August 2018, Rahman was given a life sentence for conspiracy to commit terrorism, with a minimum term of 30 years. He was also given a six-year sentence for creating the sponsorship video, with the terms being served concurrently.
