= Killings of Li Xinheng and Meng Lisi =

2017 abduction and killing of two Chinese missionaries in Pakistan

On 24 May 2017, two Chinese Christian missionaries, Li Xinheng (李欣恒) and Meng Lisi (孟丽斯), were abducted in Quetta, Pakistan, by members of Islamic State – Khorasan Province (IS-KP). The pair had been working at a private language school in the city. Fifteen days later, IS-KP released a video showing the execution of both individuals.

== Background ==
Li Xinheng was born in Hunan in approximately 1992 and Meng Lisi was born in Hubei in approximately 1990; both were of Christian faith. Although widely reported as a married couple, a woman from Quetta identified only as "Aisha" disputed this account.

In 2016, Li and Meng were placed by a South Korean-based Christian organisation at a private school in Quetta; they were among fifteen Chinese nationals assigned to the school. Their stated role was to teach Mandarin Chinese; their broader purpose was the proselytisation of Christianity.

== Abduction ==
On 24 May 2017, Li Xinheng, Meng Lisi, a colleague named Lu Ling, and their security guard left the school during a lunch break. Three armed men dressed as police officers approached the group and attempted to force their way into the vehicle. The security guard intervened and was shot and wounded. Bystanders who became involved were also fired upon, and one was injured. In the ensuing confusion, Lu Ling escaped. Li and Meng were abducted.

Shortly after the abductions, the Pakistani army launched military operations in Balochistan. Possibly in retaliation, IS-KP released a video on 8 June 2017 showing militants killing both Li and Meng. Their bodies were subsequently recovered and cremated.

Neither the Chinese nor Pakistani governments are reported to have made significant efforts to locate or secure the release of Li and Meng during their captivity.

== Aftermath ==
Following the killings, the Chinese government stated that the victims bore responsibility for their own deaths, characterising their missionary activities as illegal.

The founder of the school, a South Korean national, was arrested on suspicion of conducting illegal missionary activity in Pakistan.

On 2 November 2017, the cremated remains of Li and Meng were returned to their families. Family members publicly criticised the authorities for what they described as a failure to fulfil basic humanitarian obligations.

On 29 June 2022, a plaque dedicated to Li and Meng was unveiled in Seoul, South Korea, on the occasion of International Martyrs Day.
