= Murders of Sefter Taş and Fethi Şahin =

Execution of two Turkish soldiers by the Islamic State

Murder of Sefter Taş and Fethi Şahin
- Location: Syria
- Date: December 22, 2016
- Attack type: Death by burning
- Victims: Sefter Taş and Fethi Şahin
- Perpetrator: Islamic State
- No. of participants: 3
- Motive: To threaten Turkey and in retaliation for Turkish airstrikes against the Islamic State
- Convicted: Jamal Abdulrahman Alwi

Sefter Taş and Fethi Şahin were two Turkish Armed Forces soldiers who were burnt alive in Syria by the Islamic State in a Turkish-language video in which they threatened Turkey. The video instantly went viral and was published on December 22, 2016. The atrocity remains the most recent documented execution by burning in the world as of August 2026.

After the incident became known in Turkey, the uproar caused the government to temporarily block access to sites such as Ekşi Sözlük, Facebook, Twitter and YouTube and slow the internet down nationwide.

== Background ==
Fethi Şahin (26) and Sefter Taş (23) were two Turkish soldiers stationed in Syria before being captured by the Islamic State. Allegedly in their execution video, Şahin stated that he was an officer in the 26th Gendarmerie Intelligence Service while Taş stated that he was an Infantryman in the Turkish Armed Forces Kilis, in the Border Police Station. It was believed that the two were a part of the Turkish forces that was defending Al-Dana village in al-Bab Province when IS forces attacked the village on November 29 and captured the two. Simultaneously, the Turkish Armed Forces acknowledge that they had lost contact with two of their soldiers but at the time did not reveal the identity of the soldiers specified.

== Perpetrators ==
The identities of the executioners were determined by MİT. While it was determined that the burner and main perpetrator was Talip Akkurt, the names of the two people in the background were revealed as Hasan Aydın and Muhittin Büyükyangöz. It turned out that Hasan Aydın was detained and released twice, in 2012 and 2015. In 2012, Aydın was arrested in an operation organized by the Adana police to investigate alleged Al-Qaeda members, but later released due to lack of evidence. In 2015, he was stopped while trying to pass from Hatay to Syria in a minibus, stolen military equipment and UAVs were seized and detained in the vehicle, and then released by the court he was taken out on condition of judicial control. Akkurt was able to evade Turkish authorities but was killed by the Syrian Democratic Forces in Syria in June 2018. Büyükyangöz however remains at large.

== Execution ==
The two were taken to al-Bab city before being transferred to Raqqa. While in custody, an Islamic State judge, Jamal Abdulrahman Alwi, a Syrian national, ordered both to be burnt alive. The video showed the two soldiers in uniform but locked in the cage, before they were led out of their cage. The two were shackled as such that they were forced to crawl on all fours with the IS soldiers walking them as if they were a dog while still in uniform (probably as a form of humiliation for dogs in Islam is considered Najis). Then it cuts to the two soldiers standing side by side in uniform but barefoot, shackled somewhere at the back (possibly neck) by a chain entangled with some sort of flammable cloth. A fighter holding some sort of remote presses the button which supposedly ignites the flammable cloth on the chain which spreads up the chain to immolate the two soldiers. Alwi later moved to Turkey as a refugee in Gaziantep before being arrested and imprisoned for his role.

== Aftermath ==
During the visit to the Taş family by Turkish Armed Forces commander and Iğdır district governor on October 9, 2017, it was announced to the family that Sefter Taş was a "martyr".

The father of Fethi Şahin, criticised the lack of information on his son's case, and he stated that even six years after the video, only Kemal Kılıçdaroğlu had come to visit them.
