= Murder of Hauwa Liman =

Crime in Nigeria in 2018

- Part of Boko Haram insurgency
- Undated Portrait of Liman
- Location: 10°52′55″N 12°50′17″E; Maiduguri, Borno State, Nigeria
- Date: 15 October 2018 (aged 23–24)
- Attack type: Kidnapping; Murder
- Victim: Hauwa Mohammed Liman
- Perpetrator: Boko Haram
- Motive: Kidnapping For Ransome

Hauwa Mohammed Liman, a 24-year-old Nigerian nurse and humanitarian worker with the International Committee of the Red Cross, was abducted in March 2018 by the Islamic State West Africa Province (ISWAP), a faction of Boko Haram. She was executed on 15 October 2018. Her death drew widespread condemnation from Nigeria and the international humanitarian community. Before her execution, Muhammadu Buhari expressed sorrow and strongly condemned ISWAP's actions, pledging to hold those responsible accountable.

== Background ==
Hauwa Mohammed Liman was a humanitarian worker with the International Committee of the Red Cross (ICRC). She was a registered nurse, a trained midwife, and a student of Health Education at the University of Maiduguri.

== Execution ==
On 1 March 2018, Hauwa Liman, along with two other aid workers, Saifura Hussaini Ahmed Khorsa and Alice Loksha, was abducted by militants from the Islamic State West Africa Province (ISWAP), a faction of Boko Haram. The abduction took place during an attack on the town of Rann in Borno State, northeastern Nigeria. The attack targeted a military base and a camp for internally displaced persons (IDPs), resulting in casualties and injuries.

The militants launched an armed assault on Rann. Several civilians and aid workers lost their lives during the attack, while Hauwa Liman, Saifura Khorsa, and Alice Loksha were abducted. At the time, Liman was employed by the International Committee of the Red Cross (ICRC), delivering medical services to vulnerable groups, including women and children impacted by the insurgency.

=== ISWAP's Demands ===
After the abduction, ISWAP issued statements and videos demanding a ransom and threatening to harm the hostages if their demands were not fulfilled. The group claimed their actions were justified by accusing the aid workers of collaborating with unbelievers and aiding those they considered adversaries of their cause.

Despite appeals for negotiation and intervention by local and international organizations, efforts to secure the release of the hostages were unsuccessful. In September 2018, ISWAP executed Saifura Khorsa, to serve as a warning and increase pressure on the Nigerian government and humanitarian agencies.

On 15 October 2018, Hauwa Liman was executed by ISWAP, with the group attributing their actions to the Nigerian government’s failure to meet their demands. ISWAP stated that her association with the Red Cross and alleged non-compliance by the government were reasons for her execution. The killing prompted widespread condemnation and outrage both within Nigeria and internationally. The fate of the third abductee, Alice Loksha, remained unknown. Liman's execution was widely denounced as a war crime and a violation of international humanitarian law.

== Reactions ==
In October 2018, the International Committee of the Red Cross (ICRC) paid tribute to her life and work as a committed humanitarian. As part of the tribute, Florence Nightingale medals were presented to Liman's parents by the President of the Nigerian Red Cross Society, Bolaji Anani, and the Head of Delegation of the ICRC, Eloi Fillion, during a solemn ceremony in Maiduguri, Borno State.

The ICRC condemned the killing, describing it as a "despicable act of cruelty" and reaffirming their commitment to aiding conflict-affected communities.

Muhammadu Buhari expressed sorrow over Liman's death, condemning ISWAP's actions and pledging to bring her killers to justice.

The United Nations and several human rights organizations decried the murder, emphasizing the need for better protection of aid workers in conflict zones.

== See also ==
- Boko Haram insurgency
- International Committee of the Red Cross
- Humanitarian Aid
