= John Ridsdel =

Canadian businessman

- Born: John Bramwell Ridsdel; 9 September 1947; London, United Kingdom
- Died: 25 April 2016 (aged 68); Sulu, Philippines
- Cause of death: Beheading
- Body discovered: Sulu, Philippines
- Education: University of Toronto; London School of Economics
- Occupations: Businessman, journalist

John Bramwell Ridsdel (9 September 1947 – 25 April 2016) was an English-born Canadian businessman from Calgary, Alberta; kidnapped by Abu Sayyaf terrorists in the Philippines on 21 September 2015, and beheaded on 25 April 2016.

== Early life and career ==
Ridsdel's family originated from Britain. His mother was a Scottish-born nurse and his father a London-based physician. After moving to Durban, South Africa, and Saskatchewan, Canada, the Ridsdel family returned to Great Britain for a while, before again settling in Canada, first in Vancouver and finally in Calgary.

Ridsdel attended Upper Canada College in Toronto, Ontario, in the mid-1960s, then later graduated with a bachelor's degree in political science from the University of Toronto and a master's degree in political sociology from the London School of Economics.

He initially worked as a producer and reporter at CBC Calgary and at the Calgary Herald, before he joined Petro-Canada in Alberta, a company he represented in Pakistan, Myanmar and Algeria.

At the time of the kidnapping, he was retired. Prior to that he had been working for the mining company TVI Resource Development Philippines Inc., a subsidiary of Canada's TVI Pacific, where he was also a consultant.

== Kidnapping and death ==
Ridsdel was kidnapped by Abu Sayyaf militants in the Philippines on 21 September 2015, in a raid on Holiday Ocean View Samal Resort, on Samal Island in the southern Philippines. After the gunmen disarmed the resort's security guards, they abducted four people from the resort, the Canadians John Ridsdel and Robert Hall, the resort's Norwegian marina manager Kjartan Sekkingstad, and a Filipino woman, Teresita Flor.

The kidnappers later issued demands for a hefty ransom to be paid for the release of the hostages, reportedly 300 million pesos (around $6.5 million) for each of the three foreigners seized. As the deadline lapsed on 25 April 2016, they apparently beheaded Ridsdel. Ridsdel's head was found in a plastic bag in Jolo. A headless body, possibly Ridsdel's, was later found by villagers by a creek bed near Talipao. The Royal Canadian Mounted Police launched an international murder investigation.

Canadian Member of Parliament Bob Rae, a close friend of Ridsdel, said, "The numbers being bandied about were in the millions and millions of dollars and none of the families involved had that kind of cash." Canadian newspaper Toronto Star published (from 30 November – 7 December 2016) "Held Hostage", an eight-part investigation into what really happens when a Canadian is taken hostage abroad. The Star revealed "a system ripe for overhaul", and ways Canada could change its approach, so it may be more effectively prepared in future.
