= Jürgen Kantner =

German sailor

Jürgen Gustav Kantner (1946 – 26 February 2017) was a German sailor who was beheaded by Abu Sayyaf in the Philippines.

== Biography ==
=== First abduction ===
In 2008, he and his wife were also taken from their yacht, Rockall, and held captive in Somalia by Al-Shabaab for 52 days before their captors freed them in return for a large ransom paid by the Federal Government of Germany. After being returned to Germany, Kantner criticized his rescue, as he believed paying ransoms increased the risk to other sailors of being captured. He then started planning to recapture his boat back from the Somali pirates who had captured him. He returned by land and air to Somalia, and stole his boat back from the same beach where he was taken to as a captive.

=== Second abduction ===
On 5 November 2016, Jürgen and his wife Sabine Merz were attacked while sailing off the coast of the Philippines and Malaysia. During the incident, Merz was shot and killed by the gunmen. Kantner was taken as a hostage into the jungles of southern Sulu province, where Abu Sayyaf is based. On or before 27 February 2017, Kantner was beheaded after a ransom of 30 million pesos ($631,679) was not met.
