= Robert Hall (Canadian businessman) =

Canadian kidnap victim

- Born: 5 November 1949; Calgary, Alberta, Canada
- Died: 13 June 2016 (aged 66); Philippines
- Cause of death: Beheading
- Body discovered: Patikul, Sulu, Philippines
- Occupation: Welder

Robert Ward Hall (5 November 1949 – 13 June 2016) was a Canadian citizen kidnapped by Abu Sayyaf terrorists in the Philippines on 21 September 2015, and beheaded nine months later near Patikul, Sulu.

== Early life and career ==
Hall was born in Calgary, Alberta. One of five siblings, he grew up in the city's Midnapore district. A welder by trade, Hall was also an experienced pilot and an amateur actor.

== Kidnapping and death ==
Hall was kidnapped for ransom by Abu Sayyaf militants in the Philippines on 21 September 2015 in a raid on Holiday Ocean View Samal Resort on Samal Island near Davao in the southern Philippines. After gunmen disarmed the resort's security guards, four people were abducted: Canadians Robert Hall and John Ridsdel, resort marina manager Kjartan Sekkingstad (Norway), and Teresita Flor (Hall's Filipina girlfriend) who was released later in the month that Hall was beheaded.

Abu Sayyaf demanded $6 million for Hall's ransom. Negotiations for his release failed, and Hall was beheaded on 13 June 2016.

The last of this hostage group, Norwegian Kjartan Sekkingstad, was released in September 2016. Hall's sister then felt free to speak openly and criticize the failure of the government of Canada to do anything decisive or effective to attempt rescue or save her brother.
