= Battle of Arsal (2014) =

Military confrontation

Coordinates: 34.1794°N 36.4208°E

- Part of The Syrian Civil War spillover in Lebanon and the Qalamoun offensive (June–August 2014)
Date	2–7 August 2014 (5 days)
Location	Arsal, Lebanon
Result	Lebanese Army and Hezbollah victory: Insurgents effectively expelled from Arsal

Belligerents
Al-Nusra Front; Islamic State	Lebanon; Hezbollah (Syria) Syrian Arab Republic

Commanders and leaders
(Islamic State) Abu Hasan al-Homsi † (Islamic State) Abu Ahmed Jumaa (POW)	Samir Mouqbel; General Jean Kahwaji; Brig. General Chamel Roukoz; Colonel Maroun al-Qobayati; Colonel Nour al-Jamal †; Colonel Dany Harb †

Units involved
(Islamic State) ISIL military	Lebanese Army; 8th Infantry Brigade; Commando Regiment; Lebanese Air Force; Internal Security Forces; Hezbollah; Hezbollah Armed Strength; Syrian Air Force

Strength
700	Unknown

Casualties and losses
60 killed	20 killed, 85 wounded and 49 captured (36 released, 13 executed)
- 42–50 civilians killed

The Battle of Arsal was a major combat engagement between Lebanese forces, and Salafi jihadist militants groups from Syria at the town of Arsal in the Baalbek-Hermel Governorate of Lebanon. It involved soldiers from the Lebanese Armed Forces, Hezbollah fighters, and militants affiliated with the Al-Nusra Front and Islamic State. The Syrian Air Force also had limited involvement during the battle.

== Battle ==
On 2 August 2014, after Lebanese security forces arrested an Al-Nusra Front commander, fighters from Al-Nusra Front and ISIL surrounded Lebanese Army checkpoints in Arsal before attacking them and storming the northeastern town's police station, where they took at least 16 policemen hostage. The militants then proceeded to take control of the town, and captured two soldiers who were freed by the military later in the day. The fighting continued into the next day and left 30 militants, 10 soldiers and two civilians dead. 25 soldiers were wounded and 13 were missing and presumed captured. Two of the missing soldiers were rescued the same day.

VOA report about the kidnapped Lebanese soldiers

On 4 August, the death toll had risen to 17 soldiers, 50 civilians and 50 militants. 86 soldiers had been wounded and the number of missing had reached 22, while 135 civilians and 15 militants were wounded. Two of the dead civilians were infant Syrian refugees. The military had advanced and captured the technical institute building, which was seized by the militants the previous day, as the town came under heavy shell fire from multiple directions. In the evening, the Army also managed to capture Ras Al-Serj hill.

On 5 August, the military was attempting to capture two government buildings, while three soldiers and three policemen were released by the militants. During the day's fighting, the ISIL commander for the Arsal area was reportedly killed, while Al-Nusra forces retreated from the town. In the evening, a 24-hour cease-fire started.

On 6 August, another three soldiers were released, while 10 soldiers and 17 policemen remained as captives.

By 7 August, a fragile truce was established as ISIL forces also retreated from the town and redeployed along the border with Syria. Their hideouts there were subsequently bombed by the Syrian Air Force, resulting in dozens of wounded militants. On 22 July 2017 Hezbollah controlled 90% of Jroud arssal.

Two days later, the Lebanese Army entered Arsal in full force and re-established control over checkpoints that the militants had previously seized, while another soldier died of his wounds, bringing the military death toll to 18, which was updated to 19 by 12 August. 60 militants were also confirmed dead, as well as 42 civilians. The total number of civilians wounded was estimated at 400.
