= Jihadi John =

ISIS terrorist & executioner (1988–2015)

Mohammed Emwazi
- Emwazi wearing a mask in a video of a killing
- Born: Muhammad Jassim Abdulkarim Olayan al-Dhafiri; 17 August 1988; Al Jahra, Kuwait
- Died: 12 November 2015 (aged 27); Raqqa, Ba'athist Syria
- Cause of death: Drone strike
- Other names: "Mohammed Emwazi" "John the Beatle" "Jailer John"; Abu Abdullah al-Britani; Abu Muharib al-Yemeni; Mohammed al-Ayan; Muhammad ibn Muazzam; Mohammed Al-Zuhary; Abu Muharib al-Muhajir Jihadi John
- Citizenship: British
- Education: University of Westminster (BSc)
- Known for: Islamic State beheading incidents
- Military career
- Allegiance: Al-Nusra Front (2012–13); Islamic State (2013–15)
- Service years: 2012–2015
- Conflicts: Syrian Civil War; US-led intervention in Syria X

Mohammed Emwazi (born Muhammad Jassim Abdulkarim Olayan al-Dhafiri; Arabic: محمد جاسم عبد الكريم عليان الظفيري, romanized: Muḥammad Jāsim ʿAbd al-Karīm ʿUlayyān al-Ẓufayrī), commonly referred to as Jihadi John or Abu Muharib al-Muhajir (17 August 1988 – 12 November 2015), was a British-born militant of Kuwaiti origin seen in several videos produced by ISIS showing the beheadings of a number of captives in 2014 and 2015. A group of his hostages nicknamed him "John" since he was part of a four-person terrorist cell with English accents whom they called 'The Beatles'; the press later began calling him "Jihadi John".

On 12 November 2015, US officials reported that he had been hit by a drone strike in Raqqa, Syria. His death was confirmed by IS in January 2016.

== Early life ==
Emwazi was born to Muhammad Jassim Abdulkarim Olayan al-Dhafiri on 17 August 1988 in Kuwait as the eldest of five children to Jassem and Ghaneyah Emwazi. The family, who were Bidoon of Iraqi origin, lived in the Taima area of the town of Al Jahra, which was known as a "slumtown" where stateless people were ghettoized by the Kuwaiti government. They were undocumented, considered stateless and without Kuwaiti citizenship status. The family moved to the United Kingdom in 1994 when he was six. They settled in inner west London, moving between several properties in Maida Vale, including subsidised accommodation, later living in St John's Wood and finally in Queen's Park. Emwazi attended St Mary Magdalene Church of England primary school, and later Quintin Kynaston School. According to his former headteacher, Emwazi experienced some bullying at school.

In 2006, he went to the University of Westminster, studying Information Systems with Business Management. He secured a lower second-class Bachelor of Science honours degree on graduation three years later. At age 21, he worked as a salesman at an IT company in Kuwait and was considered by his boss as the best employee the company ever had.

Emwazi was known to MI5 years prior to his sightings in IS execution videos, having initially been suspected of having links to Al-Shabaab, and was repeatedly prevented from travelling back to Kuwait. The case prompted former British shadow home secretary David Davis to criticise the approach of UK intelligence services, noting "the numbers who appear to have 'slipped through the net'".

== Nicknames ==
Emwazi was given the nickname "John" by a group of his hostages. The hostages said that he guarded Western hostages while handling communications with their families, and was part of a terrorist cell they called 'The Beatles' because the cell members all had British accents. The nickname refers to John Lennon of the Beatles; the three other group members were each given the first name of one of the other Beatles.

The nicknames "Jihadi John", "Jailer John" and "John the Beatle" were created by journalists. "Jihadi John" was used on 20 August 2014 in the conservative magazine The Spectator in a piece titled "Jihadi John – a very British export" by Douglas Murray, a frequent critic of Islam, and soon after joined by the BBC and other sources.

== Victims ==
The following are reported victims of Jihadi John:

=== James Foley ===
In a video uploaded to YouTube on 19 August 2014, Foley read a prepared statement criticising the United States, the recent airstrikes in Iraq, and his brother who serves in the US Air Force. Emwazi, wearing a mask, also read a prepared statement in which he criticised the US and Barack Obama and made demands to cease the 2014 American-led intervention in Iraq. The masked man then beheaded Foley off-camera, after which he threatened to behead Steven Sotloff if his demands were not met. The FBI and US National Security Council confirmed that the video, which included footage of Foley's beheaded corpse, was genuine.

=== Steven Sotloff ===
On 2 September 2014, a video was released reportedly showing American journalist Steven Sotloff's beheading by Emwazi. The White House confirmed the video's authenticity.

=== David Haines ===
On 13 September 2014, a video, directed at British Prime Minister David Cameron, was released, showing British hostage aid worker David Haines being beheaded by Emwazi.

=== Alan Henning ===
On 3 October 2014, a video released by IS showed Emwazi beheading British aid worker Alan Henning. Henning, a taxi driver from Salford, Greater Manchester, had volunteered to deliver aid to Syria. He was kidnapped in Al-Dana, an area held then by IS, on 27 December 2013.

=== Peter Kassig ===
On 16 November 2014, a video was posted by IS of Emwazi standing over a severed head, which the White House confirmed was that of Peter Kassig. Kassig did not make a statement unlike earlier hostage beheading videos. There has been speculation that, faced with the prospect of being beheaded, he may have resisted and been shot dead: a surgeon performed a detailed examination of the video and noted possible evidence of a gunshot wound.

=== Syrian soldiers ===
The video that ended with a shot of Kassig's severed head showed the beheadings of a number of Syrian soldiers in gruesome detail, by a group led by a masked Emwazi. It was said by the BBC that, unlike previous videos, this one shows the faces of many of the militants, indicates the location as being Dabiq in Aleppo Province, and that this video "revels in gore." Unlike previous videos that cut away without showing the killing, Emwazi is shown beheading a victim. Initially, the number killed was variously reported as at least 12, or 18. Subsequent analysis by the Terrorism Research & Analysis Consortium and UK-based counter-extremism think tank Quilliam concluded that 22 captive soldiers were executed.

=== Haruna Yukawa and Kenji Goto ===
Haruna Yukawa, age 42, was captured sometime before August 2014. Kenji Goto, age 47, was captured sometime in October 2014 while trying to rescue Yukawa. In January 2015, a threat was issued that they would be killed unless the Japanese government paid a ransom of US$200 million. Yukawa was beheaded on 24 January, and Goto on 31 January 2015.

== Analysis of videos ==
Officially the FBI and US National Security Council confirmed that the James Foley video, which ended with footage of a beheaded corpse, was genuine. David Cameron and the British Foreign Office also confirmed the authenticity of the video showing the death of David Haines.

An unnamed forensics expert commissioned by The Times to look at the James Foley video said, "I think it has been staged. My feeling is that the murder may have happened after the camera was stopped." The Times concluded that "No one is questioning that the photojournalist James Foley was beheaded, but camera trickery and slick post-production techniques appear to have been used." Two unnamed video specialists in the International Business Times of Australia claimed that portions of the video appeared to be staged and edited. James Alvarez, a British-American hostage negotiator, also claimed the James Foley video was "expertly staged", with the use of two separate cameras and a clip-on microphone attached to Foley's orange jumpsuit. Jeff Smith, associate director of the CU Denver National Center for Media Forensics in the US, said "What's most interesting is that the actual beheading that takes place in the videos, both of them are staged."

British analyst Eliot Higgins (Brown Moses) published photographic and video forensic evidence suggesting that the James Foley video was taken at a spot in the hills south of the Syrian city of Raqqa.

== Identification and manhunt ==
=== Search for identity and early speculation ===
"Jihadi John" became the subject of a manhunt by the FBI, MI5, and Scotland Yard. In his videos, "Jihadi John" concealed his identity by covering himself from head to toe in black, except for tan desert boots, with a mask that left only his eyes visible. Despite this, several facts about "Jihadi John" could be ascertained from both videos. He spoke with an apparent London or southern England accent. In both videos, he was seen to sport a pistol in a leather shoulder holster under his left shoulder, typical of right-handed people, but his actions in the videos suggest he is left-handed.

Other factors that could have led to his identification were his height, general physique, the pattern of veins on the back of his hands, his voice and clothes. A team of analysts might use the topography of the landscape in the video in an attempt to identify the location. On 24 August 2014, the British Ambassador to the United States, Sir Peter Westmacott, said that Britain was very close to identifying "Jihadi John" using sophisticated voice recognition technology, but when pressed, refused to disclose any other details.

On 20 September 2014, the United States Senate approved a US$10 million reward for information that led to the capture of anyone involved in the murders of James Foley, Steven Sotloff and David Cawthorne Haines. On 20 November, the bill, extending the potential scope of the reward program to any American kidnapped and murdered by a "foreign terrorist organization" and limiting the reward to a maximum of US$5 million, was referred to the United States House Committee on Foreign Affairs.

On 14 September, British Prime Minister David Cameron confirmed that the identity of "Jihadi John" was known but had yet to be revealed.

On 25 September, FBI Director James Comey told reporters that they had identified the suspect, but did not give information regarding the man's identity or nationality. "I believe that we have identified him. I'm not going to tell you who I believe it is," Comey stated. Michael Ryan, an author and scholar from the Middle East Institute speculated, "maybe 98 percent or 95 percent sure is not sure enough to put a man's name out."

In August 2014, The Sunday Times reported that Abdel-Majed Abdel Bary ("L Jinny"), 23, a hip-hop musician from West London, had "emerged as a key suspect" in the investigation. Other sources also stated that Abu Hussain Al-Britani, 20, a computer hacker from Birmingham, and Abu Abdullah al-Britani, in his 20s from Portsmouth, were suspects.

=== Mohammed Emwazi ===
On 26 February 2015, The Washington Post identified the perpetrator as Mohammed Emwazi, a British man then in his mid-20s who was born in Kuwait and grew up in west London. The Washington Post investigation was undertaken by Souad Mekhennet and Adam Goldman.

According to his student card from the University of Westminster, Emwazi was born on 17 August 1988.

The BBC stated that Emwazi is believed to be "an associate of a former UK control order suspect ... who travelled to Somalia in 2006 and is allegedly linked to a facilitation and funding network for Somali militant group al-Shabab." He reportedly prayed on occasion at a mosque in Greenwich. He graduated with a degree in Information Systems with Business Management from the University of Westminster in 2009. His last known UK address was in Queen's Park, North London.

The Post reported interviews with Emwazi's friends indicating that Emwazi was radicalised after a planned safari to Tanzania following his graduation. According to the interviews, Emwazi and two friends, a German convert to Islam named Omar and another man, Abu Talib, never made the safari. Rather, upon landing in Dar es Salaam in May 2009, the three were detained, held overnight by police, and eventually deported. In May 2010, The Independent reported on the episode, identifying Emwazi as Muhammad ibn Muazzam. According to e-mails sent by Emwazi to Asim Qureshi, the research director of the human rights group Cage, and that were provided to the Post, after leaving Tanzania, Emwazi flew to Amsterdam, where he claimed that an MI5 officer accused him of attempting to go to Somalia, where al-Shabab operates. Emwazi denied attempting to reach Somalia, but a former hostage told the Post that "Jihadi John was obsessed with Somalia" and forced captives to watch videos about al-Shabab. Tanzanian officials have denied that they detained and deported Emwazi at the request of MI5, saying instead that he had been refused entry for being drunk and abusive.

Later, Emwazi and his friends were permitted to return to Britain, where Emwazi met with Qureshi in late 2009. The Post quoted Qureshi as saying that Emwazi was "incensed" at the way he had been treated. Emwazi moved to Kuwait shortly afterward, where (according to emails he wrote to Qureshi), he worked for a computer company. Emwazi returned to London twice, however, and, on the second visit, he made plans to wed a woman in Kuwait.

In June 2010, Emwazi was detained by counter-terrorism officials in Britain, who searched and fingerprinted him, and blocked him from returning to Kuwait. In an email four months later to Qureshi, Emwazi expressed sympathy for Aafia Siddiqui who had just been sentenced in US federal court for assault and attempted murder. Qureshi said he last heard from Emwazi when Emwazi sought advice from him in January 2012. Close friends of Emwazi interviewed by the Post said that he was "desperate to leave the country" and one friend stated that Emwazi unsuccessfully tried to travel to Saudi Arabia to teach English in 2012. Sometime after January 2012, Emwazi travelled to Syria, where he apparently contacted his family and at least one of his friends.

In March 2015, the media reported that his mother had recognised Jihadi John's voice as her son's; meanwhile, his father denied that this had happened or that Emwazi was Jihadi John.

== Reactions ==
United States President Barack Obama condemned the actions of "Jihadi John" and vowed punishment for all the militants responsible for the videotaped beheadings. US Secretary of State John Kerry also called "Jihadi John" a "coward behind a mask" and, echoing Obama, stated that all those responsible would be held accountable by the United States. British officials have also reiterated their commitment to capturing "Jihadi John". Admiral Alan West, a former UK Minister for Security and Counter-terrorism, said that he is a "dead man walking" who will be "hunted down" like Osama bin Laden. Prime Minister David Cameron also stated that he was absolutely certain that Jihadi John would "one way or another, face justice", and he also condemned the actions of "Jihadi John". UK Justice Secretary Chris Grayling, and Secretary General of Interpol Ronald Noble also stated that Jihadi John should be brought to justice.

Reacting to the naming of Emwazi by the media, a representative for the Sotloff family told the BBC that they would wish to see Emwazi imprisoned. Bethany Haines, daughter of David, said "It's a good step but I think all the families will feel closure and relief once there's a bullet between his eyes."

Lord Carlile, a former independent reviewer of UK anti-terror laws, said, "Had control orders been in place, in my view there is a realistic prospect that Mohammed Emwazi, and at least two of his associates, would have been the subject of control orders with a compulsory relocation."

In reaction to the revelation, Emwazi's father, Jassem, has said that he is ashamed of his son. Previously, when he learned from his son that he was going to Syria "for jihad", Jassem had told him that he hoped he would be killed. But the day after the naming he issued a statement denying that his son was Jihadi John. An unidentified cousin issued a statement which said, "We hate him. We hope he will be killed soon. This will be good news for our family."

On 8 March 2015, according to The Sunday Times, Emwazi apologised for "problems and trouble the revelation of his identity has caused" his family, but he expressed no remorse for his victims. The message was conveyed via an unspecified third party.

== Death ==
On 12 November 2015, two United States drone aircraft along with a British drone conducted an airstrike in Raqqa. The target was Emwazi. The strike was timed while he was leaving a building and entering a vehicle. A US official called it a "flawless" and "clean hit" with no collateral damage and that Emwazi was "evaporated." US officials stated he had been killed, and a senior US military official was quoted as saying, "we are 99% sure we got him." On 14 December 2015, US President Barack Obama stated Emwazi had been "taken out".

UK Prime Minister, David Cameron, stated the UK and the US had been working "hand in glove, round the clock" to track Emwazi's location, and that the drone strike was "an act of self-defence."

On 19 January 2016, in the IS magazine Dabiq, the Islamic State confirmed that Emwazi had been killed by a drone strike in Raqqa. The obituary showed him unmasked and referred to him as Abu Muharib al-Muhajir. Further photographs showing him unmasked in Syria were released on 26 January 2016.

== Later events ==
In July 2017, German-based journalist Souad Mekhennet published I Was Told to Come Alone: My Journey Behind the Lines of Jihad, which details the hunt to identify and kill Jihadi John, in part through her own investigations. She was the lead reporter of a story, published in The Washington Post, that first revealed his true identity.

In September 2017, The Telegraph released old video footage showing Mohammed Emwazi and other IS members relaxing unmasked and talking casually.

== See also ==
- Beheading in Islam
- Jack Letts, nicknamed "Jihadi Jack"
- List of solved missing person cases (2010s)
- Siddhartha Dhar, another suspected British IS militant
- Shamima Begum, a British-born IS activist
