= John Cantlie =

British war photographer and correspondent

- Cantlie in 2012
- Born: John Henry Cantlie; 7 November 1970; Winchester, Hampshire, England
- Disappeared: 22 November 2012 (aged 42); Syria
- Status: Missing for 13 years, 11 months and 30 days; presumed dead
- Occupations: War photographer and correspondent
- Parents: Paul Cantlie (father); Carol (mother)

John Henry Cantlie (born 7 November 1970) was a British war photographer and correspondent last seen alive in 2016 when he was held hostage by Islamic State. Cantlie was abducted by IS in Syria along with the later executed American journalist James Foley in November 2012. Previously, he had been kidnapped in Syria alongside Dutch photographer Jeroen Oerlemans in July 2012, but was rescued a week later. Between 2014 and 2016, while held in IS captivity, Cantlie repeatedly appeared narrating a series of their propaganda videos from Syria and Iraq.

In 2017, reports surfaced in Iraqi media claiming Cantlie had been killed by an airstrike in Mosul. There were also rumours and reports in 2017 and 2019 that he was still alive. In 2022, Cantlie's family accepted that he is dead.

== Family history ==
John Henry Cantlie was the great-grandson of Sir James Cantlie, a doctor who co-founded the Hong Kong College of Medicine for Chinese in 1887 (later the University of Hong Kong). In 1896, he was instrumental in the protection of the Chinese revolutionary Sun Yat-sen who might otherwise have been executed by the Qing dynasty secret service. His grandfather Colonel Kenneth Cantlie designed the China Railways KF locomotive, at 260 tons the largest locomotive of post-war China that remained in service until 1972. Cantlie's father, Paul, died on 16 October 2014, having released a video pleading for his son's release on his deathbed.

== Career ==
Cantlie started his journalistic career in the early 1990s as a tester for Sega video games at Future Publishing in Bath, working on Sega Power magazine.

He wrote a book named River City, a photo-documentary about modern warfare based upon his experiences in Afghanistan in 2010. It is illustrated with more than 100 photographs of Americans fighting in the war. It won the Military Reporters & Editors Award.

Hostage was aired in 2026, a BBC2 documentary about his kidnapping.

== First abduction ==
Cantlie was reportedly kidnapped by fighters while crossing illegally into Syria from Turkey on 19 July 2012, near Bab al-Hawa. Along with Dutch photographer Jeroen Oerlemans, Cantlie was shot whilst trying to escape their captors. In an interview with The Sun newspaper on 26 August 2012, Cantlie said it was "every Englishman's duty to try and escape if captured." In an account in The Sunday Times on 5 August 2012, Cantlie described his experience.

Oerlemans was shot in the left leg and Cantlie in the left arm during their escape attempt, Cantlie suffering ulnar nerve entrapment (loss of feeling and use of the hand) as a result. In an account of the shooting, Cantlie said some of the British Muslims in the group repeatedly shouted, "die, kafir!". Oerlemans then stated that "the British guys were the most vindictive of them all". They were taken back to the camp where a fighter who claimed to be an NHS doctor stabilised them and treated their wounds. The pair were threatened with execution. Oerlemans stated that it was unclear who held them, but the group of militants were of multiple ethnicities.

=== Rescue ===
On 26 July 2012, one week after being kidnapped, they were rescued by four members of the Free Syrian Army. The rebels came into the camp shooting their weapons and held at least one jihadist fighter at gunpoint while Cantlie and Oerlemans were helped into a waiting vehicle. Both photographers had to be assisted as their feet had been seriously injured when they tried to escape and neither could walk. They had lost all their camera equipment, passports and clothes in the incident, and were smuggled back across the border at a crossing used primarily by Syrian refugees. Both photographers claimed they were about to be handed over to a jihad unit affiliated with al-Qaeda for ransom when they were rescued. They were initially treated by a medic for The New York Times in Antakya before being debriefed by Turkish and then British intelligence. On 9 October 2012, an individual suspected of being involved in the kidnapping was arrested at Heathrow Airport, after arriving on a flight from Egypt.

This was Cantlie's second visit to Syria. In March 2012, he became the first Western photographer to witness first-hand an incursion by government ground troops into a city when T-72 tanks rolled into the city of Saraqib in Idlib province and started shelling indiscriminately. In a feature in The Sunday Telegraph published on 31 March, Cantlie wrote: "Then the tanks opened fire. Fist-sized pieces of shrapnel sliced through the air, decapitating one rebel immediately. His rifle clattered to the ground as his friends dragged his headless torso from the line of fire." To illustrate what the Syrian rebels were up against, Cantlie took a photograph looking down the barrel of an advancing T-72.

== Second abduction ==
Cantlie has been missing since late 2012, and the trial of one of his alleged captors collapsed in 2013, when he could not be summoned as a witness. In September 2014, it was revealed that Cantlie had been abducted a second time, along with American journalist James Foley. Their taxi driver and Foley's translator were not taken, however. They had reportedly been working together on a film about Cantlie's first abduction. Foley was beheaded by Islamic State in August 2014.

=== Islamic State propaganda ===
Cantlie in an Islamic State (IS) propaganda video

After disappearing for almost two years following his second abduction in late 2012, Cantlie resurfaced on 18 September 2014 in a video posted by IS in the first episode of a multi-part series entitled Lend Me Your Ears. Over the next four months, IS released five more videos in the series, all of which featured Cantlie speaking while sitting at a wooden table and wearing orange prison garb (a typical costume of IS hostages in their execution videos) against a black backdrop. In the videos, Cantlie adopts a critical position toward Western foreign policy, including military actions, political statements, and media coverage. He was particularly critical of U.S. and British hostage policy, comparing it unfavourably to the policy of other European countries that negotiate and pay for the release of hostages.

IS released three more videos in addition to the Lend Me Your Ears series. They depicted Cantlie as a journalist rather than a hostage. In them, he described the situation in Kobani, Mosul and IS-controlled parts of the Aleppo Province in a manner favourable to his captors.

Since he was speaking as an IS prisoner, it is unclear whether and to what degree he held the views he states. His sister, Jessica, has stated that her brother "believes two-thirds" of what he says in the videos. His family urged IS jihadist captors to make contact with them.

==== Lend Me Your Ears series ====
IS media wing al Hayat Media Center released seven videos (including the introduction) in the Lend Me Your Ears series.

Video	Release date	Length	Comments	Ref.
1	18 September 2014	3:21	Introduction	
2	18 September 2014	5:56	"Episode 1"	
3	30 September 2014	5:35	"Episode 2"	
4	12 October 2014	6:54	"Episode 3"	
5	16 October 2014	7:49	"Episode 4"	
6	12 November 2014	6:31	"Episode 5"	
7	24 November 2014	8:53	"Episode 6"	

==== "Inside" videos ====
These include:

- "Inside 'Ayn al Islam (Note: Kobani ('Ayn Al Arab) was renamed to 'Ayn al Islam during its brief occupation by IS) (Kobani)" (5:37 minutes), published 28 October 2014 (posted on YouTube on 3 February 2015). The piece appears to have been filmed during a brief period when Kobani was occupied by IS.
- "Inside Mosul" (8:15 minutes), published 3 January 2015 (posted on YouTube by Italian broadcaster Canal 25).
- "Inside Aleppo" (12:00 minutes), published 9 February 2015 (posted on YouTube on 17 February 2015). Cantlie states in the video that it would be the last film in the "Inside" series.

==== Other videos ====
- "John Cantlie Talks About the American Airstrikes on Media Kiosks in Mosul City" (3:36 minutes), published 19 March 2016. One year after the last "Inside" video Cantlie appeared in new propaganda footage from inside Mosul.
- "John Cantlie Speaking About the US Bombing Mosul University and Other Popular Areas in the City", published 12 July 2016.
- "John Cantlie Talks About Bombing the Bridges, Cutting Water and Electricity from Mosul City" (8:56 minutes), published 7 December 2016 by Amaq News Agency.
- "John Cantlie Talks About Tank Warfare in Mosul in a New Video Titled (Tank Hunters)" (47:11 minutes), published 13 December 2016 by Wilayat Ninawa.

==== Publications during imprisonment ====
Cantlie published articles in Dabiq, an IS online magazine. One of them was titled "Paradigm Shift", which depicts the "failure Obama".

== Current status ==
On 28 July 2017, the Iraqi Al-Sura News Agency alleged that Cantlie had been killed in an airstrike sometime during the battle of Mosul, after the agency conducted interviews with three captured IS militants. In October 2017, a French IS member told Paris Match that he had seen Cantlie "seven or eight months ago" in Raqqa. In January 2019, an official of the Syrian Democratic Forces stated Cantlie may still be alive inside Deir ez-Zor Governorate, Syria.

In February 2019, British Security Minister Ben Wallace stated that Cantlie was believed to still be alive. A British Home Office spokesman said: "We do not discuss individual kidnap cases and speculation is unhelpful." Wallace declined to give details of where British intelligence believed Cantlie was still being held by IS.

In 2020, according to SDF director Mustafi Bali, Cantlie might still be alive in Syria and is moving around Hajin. As of December 2024 he still hasn't been found. However, Cantlie's family believes he was killed and held a funeral for him in 2022.
