= James Foley (journalist) =

American journalist (1973–2014)

James Wright Foley
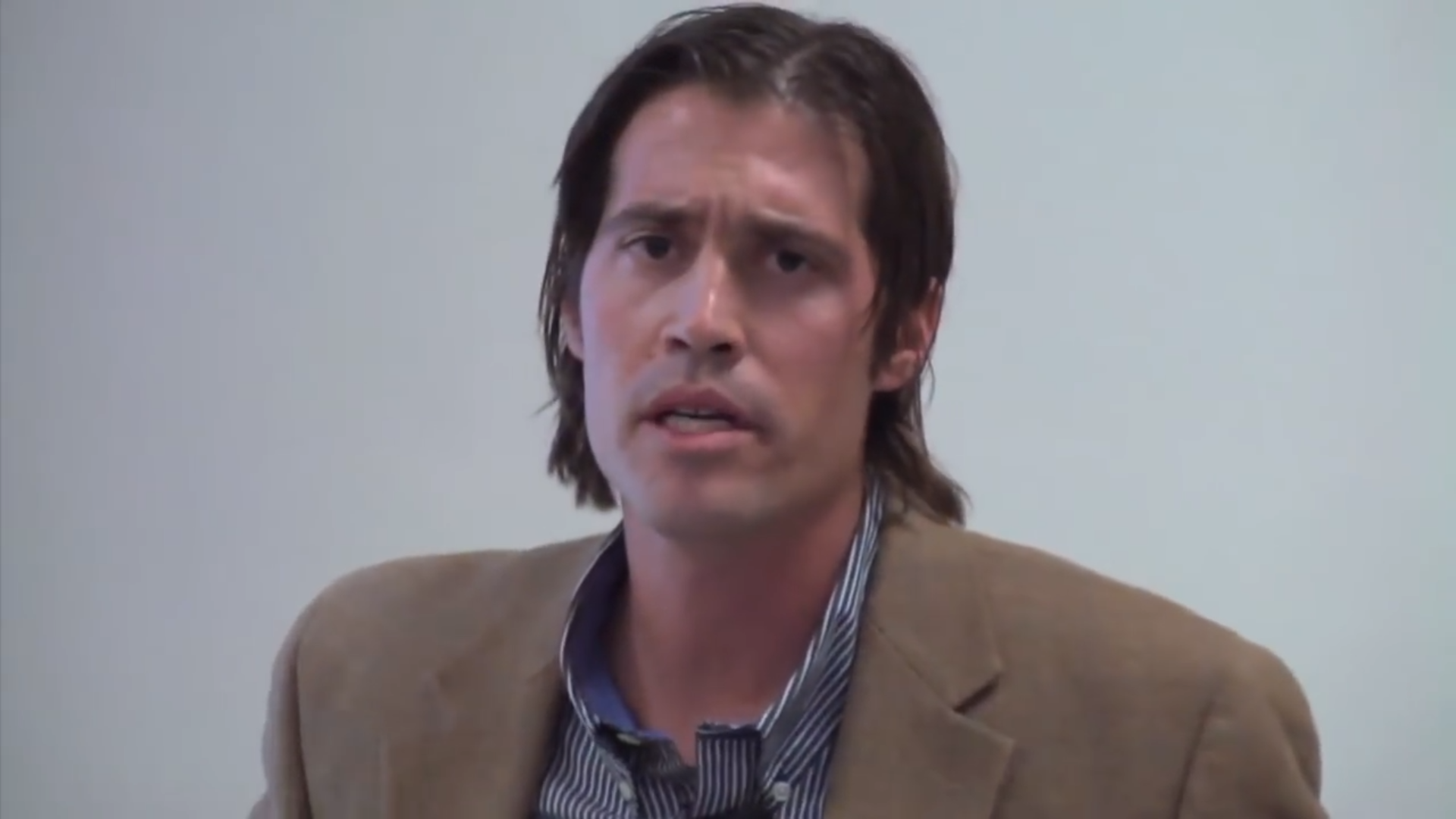
- Foley in 2012
- Born: October 18, 1973; Evanston, Illinois, U.S.
- Died: c. August 19, 2014 (aged 40); Raqqa, Syria
- Cause of death: Beheading
- Education: Marquette University (BA); University of Massachusetts Amherst (MFA); Northwestern University (MS)
- Occupation: Journalist
- Website: jamesfoleyfoundation.org

James Wright Foley (October 18, 1973 – c. August 19, 2014) was an American journalist and video reporter. While working as a freelance war correspondent during the Syrian Civil War, he was abducted on November 22, 2012, in north-western Syria. He was murdered by beheading in August 2014 purportedly as a response to American airstrikes in Iraq, thus becoming the first American citizen to be murdered by the Islamic State of Iraq and Syria (ISIS).

Before becoming a journalist, Foley was an instructor for Teach For America. By spring 2008, in Iraq, he became an embedded journalist with an Indiana National Guard unit, writing a story for In These Times about condolence payments paid to Iraqis. In 2008, he became an embedded journalist with USAID-funded development projects in Iraq. He was an embedded journalist with the U.S. Army in Afghanistan and in January 2011 he began writing for the military newspaper Stars and Stripes from his post there. Later in 2011 he reported for GlobalPost in Libya. There, he was captured by Gaddafi loyalist forces and held for 44 days. The next year, Foley was captured in Syria while he was working for Agence France-Presse and GlobalPost.

== Early life ==
Foley was born in Evanston, Illinois, the oldest of five children born to Diane and John Foley of Rochester, New Hampshire. He grew up in Wolfeboro, New Hampshire, where he attended Kingswood Regional High School. He was raised as a Catholic. In 1996, he graduated from Marquette University, earning a Bachelor of Arts degree in history and Spanish, followed by a Master of Fine Arts in creative writing from the University of Massachusetts Amherst in 2002, and a Master of Science from Northwestern University's Medill School of Journalism in 2008.

== Career ==
Foley began his career as a teacher in Arizona for Teach For America. In 1999, Foley decided to pursue his MFA in creative writing at the University of Massachusetts Amherst. Upon completion of his MFA in 2003, Foley returned to Phoenix for one year before relocating to Chicago in the summer of 2004 and taking a job teaching writing to young felons at the Cook County Boot Camp. In 2007, Foley enrolled in Northwestern's Medill School of Journalism.

Starting in 2008, Foley worked for USAID-funded Tatweer development projects in Baghdad. He helped organize conferences and training seminars for a program designed to rebuild Iraq's civil service, crippled by decades of isolation and autocratic administration. He also became an embedded journalist in Iraq with the U.S.101st Airborne Division and the 76th Infantry Brigade of the Indiana National Guard. In 2009, he became an embedded journalist, in Nuristan, Nangarhar and Kunar, Afghanistan, with the United States 4th Infantry Division and 10th Mountain Division. He continued his work as an embedded military journalist in Afghanistan in 2010.

In January 2011, Foley joined Stars and Stripes as a reporter on assignment in Afghanistan. Two months later he was detained by U.S. military police at Kandahar Air Field on suspicion of possessing and using marijuana. On March 3, 2011, Foley admitted that he had marijuana in his possession and resigned his position. Shortly thereafter Foley began working for the Boston-based GlobalPost and went to Libya to cover the uprising against Muammar Gaddafi, embedding himself with rebel fighters.

== 2011 detention in Libya ==
According to media reports, on the morning of April 5, 2011, Foley, fellow American Clare Morgana Gillis, a freelance reporter (Atlantic Monthly, Christian Science Monitor, and USA Today), as well as Spanish photographer Manu Brabo, were attacked and captured near Brega, Libya, by forces loyal to Gaddafi; fellow photojournalist Anton Hammerl was killed. When the shooting started, Foley and Gillis both heard Hammerl yell out, "Help!" Foley, Gillis, and Brabo were beaten by the pro-Gaddafi forces and then taken as their prisoners. Foley stated: "Once I saw Anton lying there dead, it was like everything had changed. The whole world has changed. I don't even know that I felt some of the blows." Gillis said, "We all glanced down at him as we were being taken by, and I saw him just lying in a pool of blood. And then we were put into the truck and our heads were pushed down. We weren't able to see anything that happened after that to him."

Foley was released from jail 44 days later. On May 18, Foley, Gillis and Brabo, as well as Nigel Chandler (an English journalist also being held), were brought to the Rixos Hotel in Tripoli after release. Foley returned to Milwaukee to thank the community for praying for his safe return. In an interview, he said, "You go through different emotions when you're in captivity ... These weird extreme ideas of where you are based on this capture. You don't want to be defined as that guy who got captured in 2011. I believe front line journalism is important [without it] we can't tell the world how bad it might be." Foley also wrote an article for Marquette Magazine about how rosary prayers helped get him through his captivity. His experience of being captured did not deter him; he quickly returned to Libya, and was at the scene of Muammar Gaddafi's capture with GlobalPost correspondent Tracey Shelton on October 20, 2011.

== Kidnapping in Syria, hostage negotiations, and rescue attempt ==
During the Syrian Civil War, Foley continued working as a freelancer for GlobalPost, in addition to other media outlets, such as Agence France-Presse. On November 22, 2012, Foley was kidnapped by an organized gang after departing from an internet café with British journalist John Cantlie, in northwestern Syria while on their way to the Turkish border. Their taxi driver and Foley's translator were not taken. Foley and Cantlie were reportedly working on a film depicting Cantlie's previous abduction and dramatic rescue by four members of the Free Syrian Army in July 2012. Sources close to the family said that they believed Foley was kidnapped by the Shabiha militia, a group loyal to Syrian President Bashar al-Assad. He was later reportedly held in a Syrian Air Force Intelligence complex in Damascus.

During negotiations from November to December 2013, Foley's captors demanded €100 million in ransom (approximately US$132 million) from Foley's family, GlobalPost (his employer), and the U.S. in exchange for his release. The chief executive officer of GlobalPost, Philip Balboni, stated that the company spent millions on efforts to bring Foley home, including hiring an international security firm, Kroll Inc. In September 2013, the firm was able to locate Foley and track his location. He was moved many times during his captivity. Kroll's research led to GlobalPost reporting that Foley was being held in a Damascus prison run by Syrian Air Force Intelligence, along with at least one other Western journalist, possibly Austin Tice. This information turned out to be false—Foley was never held by the Syrian government or Syrian loyalists and was instead in the hands of the Islamist group that would come to be known as ISIS.

In June 2014, ISIS released Danish photojournalist and fellow hostage Daniel Rye Ottosen, and Ottosen called Foley's family to recite a memorized message that came to be known as Foley's final letter. In it, Foley addressed members of his family, and described his captivity in a cell with seventeen other hostages, who passed the time with improvised strategy games and lectures. The family released the letter on their Facebook page shortly after Foley's death.

In July 2014, U.S. President Barack Obama authorized a "substantial and complex" rescue operation after the U.S. intelligence community said a "broad collection of intelligence" led them to believe that the hostages were being held at a specific location in Syria. However, the mission failed because the hostages had been moved. The operation involved special operations forces from multiple branches of the US military, including: the 160th Special Operations Aviation Regiment, helicopters, fixed wing aircraft, and drones. When Delta Force commandos landed in the eastern Syrian city of Raqqa, they were met with gunfire, and it became apparent that the hostages had been moved. ISIS suffered numerous casualties, while American forces suffered a single minor injury. The operation was only declassified after Foley's death. It represented the first confirmation of U.S. troops operating on the ground within Syria during the Syrian Civil War.

On August 12, 2014, ISIS sent Foley's parents an email saying that U.S. government—unlike other governments—had refused to pay ransoms or negotiate prisoner exchanges, and saying that they would kill Foley. The email's authors said they had left the U.S. alone since its "disgraceful defeat in Iraq," but would "avenge" the U.S. bombings, initially with the death of Foley. John Foley, the father of James, said he did not realize how "brutal" his captors were. Even after receiving the email, he held out hope that his son's release could still be negotiated. The family had reportedly been preparing to break U.S. law by offering to pay a ransom for his release. Due to his nationality, Foley's captors subjected him to regular torture and mock executions during his captivity.

== Murder ==
Foley's whereabouts were unknown to most until August 19, 2014, when ISIS uploaded a video to YouTube entitled "A Message to America". Though quickly deleted, it continued to circulate elsewhere on the Internet. (Note: A copy of the YouTube video that was posted to LiveLeak was deleted by that site out of concerns of promoting ISIS. The legality of viewing or sharing the video in Britain has been questioned.) Filmed in several takes, the video started with Obama's announcement of the first U.S. airstrikes against ISIL in Iraq. It then cut to Foley kneeling in the desert next to a masked, black-clad ISIL terrorist and reading a long message expressing regret. After Foley finished the message, the terrorist condemned U.S. airstrikes and threatened that any aggression by America would "result in the bloodshed of your people."

The actual beheading took place in less than ten seconds, although the entire recording was longer than four-and-a-half minutes. It did not show the actual moment of Foley's decapitation unlike previous beheading videos, which typically showed the entire act. After Foley's beheaded corpse was shown, his murderer revealed that ISIL was holding another American journalist, Time magazine contributor Steven Joel Sotloff, and that he would be murdered if President Obama failed to halt air strikes against ISIL. A video showing the beheading of Sotloff was released on September 2, 2014.

The video of Foley being beheaded was shot at an unknown desert location, and media sources gave the name Jihadi John to the man (later discovered to be Mohammed Emwazi) who made the threats and spoke with a "Multicultural London English" accent. The video was produced and distributed by Al-Furqan Media Foundation, a media outlet of ISIL and part of its propaganda arm, the Al-Itisam Establishment for Media Production, which targeted Western and non-Arabic speaking audiences.

Foley's family confirmed his death on August 19. His mother, Diane Foley, posted on the Free James Foley page on Facebook: "We have never been prouder of our son Jim, he gave his life trying to expose the world to the suffering of the Syrian people". On August 20, the United States National Security Council confirmed that the video was authentic. ISIL appeared to have used post-production techniques on the murder video.

On August 22, fellow hostage Peter Moore, who had been held in Iraq, called on Foley's captors to release his body to his family. British analyst Eliot Higgins offered photographic and video forensic evidence that Foley was murdered at a spot in the hills south of the Syrian city Raqqa. Foley's remains were never recovered, despite efforts to do so.

=== Death of perpetrator ===
The U.S. Justice Department conducted a criminal investigation into Foley's death. Attorney General Eric Holder said in 2014: "We will not forget what happened and people will be held accountable, one way or the other." Mohammed Emwazi, who murdered Foley, was killed in a targeted drone strike in Raqqa in November 2015.

== Video ==
In response to the widespread posting, viewing, and commenting on the video depicting Foley's murder, Commissioner of Police of the Metropolis Sir Bernard Hogan-Howe warned "We would like to remind the public that viewing, downloading or disseminating extremist material within the UK may constitute an offence under terrorism legislation." He went on to explain that while viewing the video was technically a crime, his officers would be focused on tracking down those who shared the footage or glorified it. Twitter and YouTube executives also warned objectionable material would be deleted and accounts that posted it, or spread it, would be blocked.

== Legacy ==
Since 2014, the James Foley Medill Medal for Courage in Journalism, from Medill School of Journalism, at Northwestern University, "is given to the individual or team of journalists working for a U.S.-based media outlet who best display moral, ethical or physical courage in the pursuit of a story or series of stories." In 2014, Agence France-Presse (AFP) also released a statement saying that it would "no longer accept work from freelance journalists who travel to places where we ourselves would not venture." Former students and colleagues from Lowell Elementary (where he taught for three years) have since started a scholarship in his name. The James Foley Scholarship in the J. William and Mary Diederich College of Communication was established at Marquette University in his honor.

On August 22, 2014, Indian sand artist Sudarsan Pattnaik created a sculpture depicting the face of Foley, made of four tons of sand on the beach of Puri city in the eastern province of Odisha. The sculpture, with a message reading "Don't kill innocents!", drew a sizeable crowd on the beach. Also in 2014, Boston-based GlobalPost, for which Foley had been a contributor, released a statement saying, "While we continue to send staff correspondents to Syria, we no longer accept freelance work from that war zone." Pope Francis called Foley's family to express his condolences. Foley's brother said he believed the U.S. government could have done more to save James during hostage negotiations, adding he hoped the government would "take another look at our approach to terrorist and hostage negotiation."

In 2014, Foley's family started the James W. Foley Legacy Fund to work in three areas: "building a resource center for families of American hostages and fostering a global dialog on governmental policies in hostage crises; supporting American journalists reporting from conflict zones and promoting quality educational opportunities for urban youth." The James W. Foley Legacy Foundation (JWFLF) was established following his death. His family and friends felt challenged to continue his legacy of commitment to the truth and compassion for those without a voice. The foundation seeks to "advocate for the safe return of Americans taken hostage [and] educate student journalists about staying safe in dangerous situations."

In 2016, the documentary film Jim: The James Foley Story was released, directed by Brian Oakes and distributed by Dogwoof. In November 2016, English singer Sting wrote and recorded "The Empty Chair", a song about Foley's fate, appearing as the last track on his solo studio album 57th & 9th. The song was nominated for the Academy Award for Best Original Song. In 2018, according to Charlie Savage, writing in The New York Times, Foley's mother Diane has called for the individuals who murdered him and abused him to be given a fair trial, not tried through a Guantanamo Military Commission. She argued that an unfair trial would aid the terrorist cause. In 2019, the Danish biographical narrative film Daniel, about fellow ISIS hostage Daniel Rye Ottosen, released for ransom, includes Foley, as played by Toby Kebbell. On 4 January 2024, Irish author Colum McCann, along with Diane Foley, published the book American Mother, which chronicles Diane Foley's experience of her son's imprisonment, death, and her meetings with one of his captors, Alexanda Kotey.

== See also ==
- Islamist beheading
- 2014 American Intervention in Syria
- Aafia Siddiqui
- Foreign hostages in Iraq
- Jihadi Beatles, terrorist cell of ISIL

Kidnapped journalists

- Nick Berg
- Kenneth Bigley
- John Cantlie
- Daniel Pearl
- Steven Sotloff
- Austin Tice
