= Beheading video =

Form of propaganda depicting a live murder

A beheading video is a video which depicts a live murder by beheading or the aftermath (e.g., display of the severed head). Such videos are typically distributed mostly through the Internet, and are often employed by groups seeking to instill shock or terror into a population. Although beheading has been a widely employed public execution method since the ancient Greeks and Romans, videos of this type only began to arise in 2002 with the beheading of Daniel Pearl and the growth of the Internet in the Information Age, which allowed groups to anonymously publish these videos for public consumption. The beheadings shown in these videos are usually not performed in a "classical" method — decapitating a victim quickly with a blow from a sword or axe — but by the relatively slow and torturous process of slicing and sawing the victim's neck, while still alive, with a knife.

== History ==
The first beheading by the National Movement for the Restoration of Pakistani Sovereignty was of Daniel Pearl in 2002. The videos were popularized in 2004 by Abu Musab al-Zarqawi, a radical Islamic militant.

The videos caused controversy among Islamic scholars, some of whom denounced them as against Islamic law; al-Qaeda did not approve and Osama bin Laden considered them poor public relations. Regardless, they became popular with certain Islamic terrorist groups, such as the Islamic State.

Early videos were grainy and unsophisticated, but, according to the Chicago Sun-Times, had by 2004 been "growing in sophistication, using animated graphics and editing techniques apparently aimed at embellishing the audio to make a victim's final moments seem more disturbing". These videos are often uploaded to the Internet by terrorists, then discussed and distributed by web-based outlets, such as blogs, shock sites, and traditional journalistic media. In 2013, a beheading video by a Mexican drug cartel spread virally on Facebook. The non-profit organization Family Online Safety Institute petitioned Facebook to remove the video. Initially, Facebook refused. They later complied, and subsequently clarified their policies, stating that beheading videos would only be allowed if posted in a manner intended for its users to "condemn" the acts.

Writing in The Atlantic, Simon Cottee drew comparisons between jihadist videos and gonzo pornography, expanding on the same observation historian Michael Burleigh made in passing in his 2008 book, Blood and Rage: A Cultural History of Terrorism.

== Videos released ==
=== 1996–1999 ===
- An unknown Russian soldier was beheaded in 1996 in Chechnya by insurgents during the First Chechen war, known as "Chechclear", it is often rumoured that the victim was Yevgeny Rodionov, though this claim lacked evidence.
- One officer and five enlisted men in the Russian military were decapitated on film during the Tukhchar massacre on September 5, 1999.

=== 2002 ===
- Daniel Pearl, U.S. citizen, beheaded February 1, 2002, in Pakistan by al-Qaeda jihadists.
- A video (published in July 2002 by the FSB) shows a woman being beheaded by alleged henchmen of Chechen commander Movsar Barayev.

=== 2004 ===
- Nick Berg, U.S. citizen, beheaded May 7, 2004, in Iraq by Muntada al-Ansar jihadists.
- Paul Marshall Johnson, Jr., U.S. citizen, beheaded in June 2004 in Saudi Arabia by al-Qaeda jihadists.
- Kim Sun-il, South Korean citizen, beheaded in June 2004 in Iraq by jihadists of Jama'at al-Tawhid wal-Jihad (JTJ).
- Georgi Lazov, Bulgarian citizen, beheaded in July 2004 in Iraq by JTJ jihadists.
- Mohammed Mutawalli, Egyptian citizen, beheaded in August 2004 in Iraq by JTJ jihadists.
- Durmuş Kumdereli, Turkish citizen, beheaded in August 2004 in Iraq by JTJ jihadists
- One Nepali citizen, beheaded in August 2004 in Iraq by JTJ jihadists.
- Eugene Armstrong, U.S. citizen, beheaded in September 2004 in Iraq by JTJ jihadists.
- Jack Hensley, U.S. citizen, beheaded in September 2004 in Iraq by JTJ jihadists.
- Kenneth Bigley, British citizen, beheaded on October 7, 2004 in Iraq by JTJ jihadists.
- Shosei Koda, Japanese citizen, beheaded on October 29, 2004, in Iraq by jihadists of al-Qaeda in Iraq.

=== 2005–2013 ===
- Shamil Odamanov, Russian citizen of Dagestani descent. Odamanov was beheaded in 2007 by Russian neo-Nazis.
- Nikolay Melnik, Kazakhstani citizen, beheaded July 18, 2008, in Podyachevo, Russia by his fellow neo-Nazi Konstantin Nikiforenko of the NSO-North.
- Piotr Stańczak, Polish citizen, beheaded on February 7, 2009, in Pakistan by Tehreek-e-Taliban jihadists.
- Two Shiite Muslims, beheaded in 2012, in Pakistan by Lashkar-e-Jhangvi jihadists.

=== 2014 ===
- James Foley, U.S. citizen, beheaded August 19, 2014, south of Raqqa, Syria by jihadists of the Islamic State (IS).
- Four Egyptians, beheaded in August 2014 in Sheikh Zuweid, by Ansar Bait al-Maqdis jihadists.
- Steven Sotloff, U.S. citizen, beheaded in August 2014, south of Raqqa, Syria by IS jihadists.
- David Cawthorne Haines, U.K. citizen, beheaded in September 2014 in Syria by IS jihadists.
- Hervé Gourdel, French citizen, beheaded in September 2014, east of Algiers, Algeria by Jund al-Khilafah jihadists supporting IS.
- Alan Henning, U.K. citizen, beheaded in October 2014, in Syria by IS jihadists.
- Peter Kassig, U.S. citizen beheaded in November 2014, in Dabiq, Aleppo, Syria by IS jihadists.
- Eighteen Syrian soldiers of the Syrian Arab Army, beheaded in November 2014, in Dabiq, Aleppo, Syria by IS jihadists.

=== 2015 ===
- Haruna Yukawa, Japanese citizen, beheaded in January 2015 by IS jihadists. A video released by ISIS on January 24, 2015, consists of audio message and a still image showing Kenji Goto holding a photograph of beheaded Yukawa. Unlike previous beheading videos released by ISIS, it does not show the actual beheading of Haruna Yukawa.
- Kenji Goto, Japanese citizen, beheaded in January 2015 near Raqqa, Syria, by IS jihadists.
- Twenty-one Egyptian Coptic Christians, beheaded in February 2015 near Tripoli, Libya, by IS jihadists.
- Twenty-eight Ethiopian Christians, beheaded in Libya in April 2015 by IS jihadists.
- A video (article published July 2015) shows a boy executing a Syrian Arab Army soldier using a knife in Palmyra.
- Four Kurdish Peshmerga members, beheaded in Iraq in October 2015 by IS jihadists.
- A video showing the beheading of a Russian spy agent by an IS fighter, who is threatening Russia and President Vladimir Putin with attacks, was released in December 2015.

=== 2016 ===
- John Ridsdel and Robert Hall, Canadian citizens, beheaded respectively in April and June 2016 in the Philippines by Abu Sayyaf jihadists.
- Abdullah Tayseer Al Issa, Palestinian citizen, beheaded in July 2016 in Syria by Nour al-Din al-Zenki Movement rebels, allegedly of the Liwa al-Quds: this incident precipitated the end of Timber Sycamore in Syria.

=== 2017 ===
- Jürgen Kantner, German citizen, beheaded in February 2017 in the Philippines by Abu Sayyaf jihadists.
- IS has released a video claiming to show one of its jihadists beheading a Russian officer.
- Muhammad "Hamadi" Abdullah al-Ismail, Syrian citizen who allegedly deserted the Syrian Arab Army, tortured with a sledgehammer and beheaded near the al-Shaer oil fields, Homs Governorate, Syria (the first footage appeared online in June 2017) by Russian mercenaries linked to the Wagner Group.

=== 2018 ===
- Louisa Vesterager Jespersen, Danish citizen, and Maren Ueland, Norwegian citizen, beheaded in December 2018 in Morocco by alleged IS jihadists.

=== 2019 ===
- Ayafor Florence, a Cameroonian citizen who worked as a wardress at the Bamenda Central Prison, was beheaded on September 29, 2019 in Pinyin, Northwest Region, Cameroon by Ambazonian militants.

=== 2021 ===
- A TikTok video showing a person being beheaded was uploaded by the user @mayengg03 and went viral. The clip starts with a young girl dancing in front of a camera, before switching to a different video with unrelated people where the beheading occurs. TikTok removed the video.
- An Egyptian man beheaded a victim and wandered in the street while holding up the severed head in broad daylight.

=== 2022 ===
- Kanhaiya Lal, a Hindu tailor, was murdered during an attempted beheading following the 2022 Muhammad remarks controversy in India. The two Muslim perpetrators recorded themselves committing the crime but fled from the scene after slicing the victim's throat.

=== 2023 ===
- Hamas baby beheading hoax, were false claims of video evidence of beheadings of babies.
- A Ukrainian soldier was beheaded by Russians on a video during the Russian invasion of Ukraine.

=== 2024 ===
- An unemployed Pennsylvania resident and self-proclaimed militia leader, 33-year-old Justin Mohn, uploaded a 14-minute YouTube video that displayed the severed head of his 68-year-old father, Michael Mohn, whom he said "is now in hell for eternity as a traitor to this country". Police later confirmed that the father had died and his head had been removed, and charged him with first-degree murder and abuse of a corpse. The video was removed from YouTube about five hours after it was published and the YouTube channel was terminated. Justin Mohn was found guilty of first-degree murder and sentenced to life imprisonment without parole in 2025.

=== 2025 ===
- In late July 2025, a snuff film titled "The Vietnamese Butcher" showing the beheading of Nguyễn Xuân Đạt was released on a private Telegram group, selling access to the video for ¥89-¥198. The perpetrator of the act, Đoàn Văn Sáng, was arrested in late November 2025 and charged with murder.

=== 2026 ===
- A video released by the Syrian Democratic Forces appears to show Syrian soldiers decapitating four captured Kurdish fighters in northeastern Syria.

== Hoax ==
A hoax beheading video filmed by Benjamin Vanderford, Robert Martin, and Laurie Kirchner in 2004 received wide attention from the American press. The video used Jama'at al-Tawhid wal-Jihad's logo, but not the group's flag. It was originally filmed for Vanderford's local election campaign. He was seeking Matt Gonzalez's seat on the San Francisco Board of Supervisors. Vanderford's second intention was to point out how uncritically the mainstream media would accept an anonymous video. The Islamic Global Media Center claimed to have made the video, but removed it from their website after the hoax was discovered. The video also appeared on other militant websites and was broadcast on Arabic television.

== See also ==
- Islamic State beheadings
- Decapitation in Islam
- Martyrdom video
- Snuff film
- Livestreamed crime
- The Beatles (terrorist cell)
