= Kidnapping and killing of Margaret Hassan =

2004 incident during the Iraq War

Margaret Hassan
- Born: Margaret Fitzsimons; 18 April 1945; Dublin, Ireland
- Disappeared: 8 November 2004 (aged 59); Baghdad, Iraq
- Status: Declared dead in absentia
- Occupation: Aid worker
- Employer: CARE International
- Known for: Being abducted during the Iraqi insurgency
- Spouse: Tahseen Ali Hassan (m. 1972)

Margaret Hassan (née Fitzsimons; 18 April 1945 – 8 November 2004) was an Irish aid worker who had worked in Iraq for many years until she was abducted by unidentified assailants in Baghdad during the Iraqi insurgency. Her captors subsequently filmed and released a video of her stating that she was living her "last hours" before she pleaded for the withdrawal of British troops from Iraq; she has not been seen since, and her remains were never recovered.

Hassan was born in Dublin, Ireland, in the final months of World War II. Her family soon immigrated to the United Kingdom, where she ended up marrying an Iraqi man who had been studying in London. She relocated to Iraq with him in the 1970s, eventually learning Arabic and becoming an Iraqi citizen. Hassan remained in Baghdad during the Iran–Iraq War and the Gulf War.

== Life and career ==
She was born Margaret Fitzsimons in Dalkey, County Dublin, Ireland, to parents Peter and Mary Fitzsimons. However, soon after the end of World War II her family moved to London, England, where she spent most of her early life and where her younger siblings were born.

=== Marriage and immigration to Iraq ===
At the age of 27, she married Tahseen Ali Hassan, a 29-year-old Iraqi man studying engineering in the United Kingdom. She moved to Iraq with him in 1972, where she began work with the British Council of Baghdad, teaching English. Eventually she learned Arabic and became an Iraqi citizen.

She remained a Roman Catholic throughout her life and never converted to Islam as was widely reported after her death. A requiem Mass was held for her, after her death was confirmed, at Westminster Cathedral by Cardinal Cormac Murphy-O'Connor.

During the early 1980s, Hassan became the assistant director of studies at the British Council; later in the decade she became director. Meanwhile, Tahseen worked as an economist. She remained in Baghdad during the 1991 Gulf War, although the British Council suspended operations in Iraq, and she was left jobless at the end of it.

=== Gulf War aid efforts ===
Hassan joined humanitarian relief organisation CARE International in 1991, the aid group having established itself in Iraq during that year. Sanitation, health, and nutrition became major concerns in the sanctioned Iraq; she became a vocal critic of the United Nations restrictions. She was opposed to the United States invasion of Iraq in 2003, arguing before it that the Iraqis were already "living through a terrible emergency. They do not have the resources to withstand an additional crisis brought about by military action". Margaret was crucially involved in bringing leukaemia medicine to child cancer victims in Iraq in 1998.

By 2004, she was head of Iraqi operations for CARE. Well known in many of Baghdad's slums and other cities, Hassan was especially interested in Iraq's young people, whom she called "the lost generation". Her presence could draw large crowds of locals.

== Abduction during the Iraq War ==
Hassan was kidnapped in Baghdad on 19 October 2004, and was killed some weeks later on 8 November. In a video released of her in captivity she pleaded for the withdrawal of British troops. She stated that "these might be [her] last hours", "Please help me. The British people, tell Mr Tony Blair to take the troops out of Iraq and not bring them here to Baghdad", and that she did not "want to die like Mr Bigley", a reference to Kenneth Bigley, who had been murdered in Iraq only weeks earlier.

Patients of an Iraqi hospital (where her work had some effect) took to the streets in protest against the hostage takers' actions. On 25 October, between 100 and 200 Iraqis protested outside CARE's offices in Baghdad, demanding her release. Prominent elements of the Iraqi insurgency, such as the Shura Council of Fallujah Mujahideen, along with Iraqi political figures such as the Shia cleric Grand Ayatollah Ali al-Sistani, condemned the kidnapping and called for her release. On 2 November, Al Jazeera reported that the kidnappers threatened to hand her over to the group led by Abu Musab al-Zarqawi who were responsible for the murder of Kenneth Bigley. On 6 November, a statement purportedly from al-Zarqawi appeared on an Islamist website calling for the release of Hassan unless the kidnappers had information she was aligned with the invading coalition. However, the statement could not be authenticated. Hassan's whereabouts were unknown in the video.

On 15 November, US Marines in Fallujah uncovered the body of an unidentified blonde- or grey-haired woman with her legs and arms cut off and throat slit. The body could not be immediately identified, but was thought unlikely to be Hassan, who had brown hair. There was one other Western woman known missing in Iraq at the time the body was discovered, Teresa Borcz Khalifa, 54, Polish-born and also a long-time Iraqi resident. Khalifa was found alive and rescued from her hostage takers on 20 November.

On 16 November, CNN reported that 'CARE' had issued a statement indicating that the organisation was aware of a videotape showing Hassan's murder. Al Jazeera reported that it had received a tape showing Hassan's murder but was unable to confirm its authenticity. The video showed Hassan being shot with a handgun by a masked man. It is not known who was responsible for Hassan's abduction and alleged murder.

The group holding her never identified itself in the hostage videos.

=== Aftermath ===
CARE International suspended operations in Iraq because of Hassan's kidnapping. The last CARE project Hassan completed was one for children with spinal injuries. The director of the spinal cord clinic she supported in Baghdad, Qayder al-Chalabi, called her loss a huge blow to all Iraqis. "(The killers) made a very big mistake. This was a [sic] wrong person", he said on 17 November. "We need to admire and remember her. We must have a ceremony every year to remember her". He believed that a statue should be erected in her honour.

At least eight other women kidnapped and tortured by insurgents during the conflict were found and rescued from captivity (Simona Pari, Simona Torretta, Florence Aubenas, Giuliana Sgrena, Teresa Borcz Khalifa, Hannelore Krause, Marie Jeanne Ion, and Jill Carroll). It is unclear why Margaret Hassan, who was opposed to the war, lived in Iraq for many years, held Iraqi citizenship, was married to an Arab Muslim and spoke fluent Arabic was killed; the kidnappers did not identify their group nor their aims. In 2010, her family said that they continued to hope that her remains would be found and returned to them for a Christian burial.

== Investigation ==
On 1 May 2005, three men were questioned by Iraqi police in connection with the murder. On 5 June 2006, news reports emerged that an Iraqi man by the name of Mustafa Salman al-Jubouri has been sentenced to life imprisonment for "aiding and abetting the kidnappers" but two other men were acquitted. Margaret Hassan's family said the verdict left them "devastated and appalled". It is unclear what role the others who were acquitted played in the kidnapping or the role of the suspect who was found guilty. Al-Jubouri appealed this sentence and was given a shorter imprisonment.

=== Arrest of Ali Lufti Jassar al-Rawi (2008) ===
An Iraqi man named Ali Lutfi Jassar al-Rawi, also known as Abu Rasha, an architect from Baghdad, was arrested by Iraqi and US forces in 2008 after contacting the British Embassy in Baghdad and attempting to extort 1 million dollars in return for disclosing the location of Hassan's body. He reportedly had knowledge of an intimate detail about Hassan, known only to her closest relatives and friends, which he used to validate his knowledge of her whereabouts. Though Jassar signed statements confessing to the charges, he pleaded not guilty, stating he was forced to sign them after receiving beatings and electrical shocks during questioning. "I have nothing to do with Hassan's abduction and I did not see or talk to her," Jassar said.

On 2 June 2009, the Press Association reported that Jassar was given a life sentence by Baghdad's Central Criminal Court for being involved in Hassan's abduction and murder, and for attempting to blackmail the British Embassy. Hassan's family welcomed the court's decision but pleaded with Jassar to tell them where her body is so they can return her to Britain for burial.

=== Escape of Jassar from prison (2010) ===
On 14 July 2010, a day before Jassar was due to appear in court for retrial, it was reported that he could not be located in the prison facility where he was being held. He had been missing for a month. He had not appeared at any of the previous retrial dates, which led to concerns that he had been released. Jassar recently transferred to a Baghdad jail after being held in northern Iraq. Jassar was not found after checking with both facilities. The director of Iraq's prisoner transfer system told an appeals judge that the killer's whereabouts were unknown. Hassan's family and lawyer believe the prisoner has escaped.

On 22 August 2010 Iraq's deputy justice minister, Busho Ibrahim, said Jassar had been helped to escape from Baghdad central prison, formerly Abu Ghraib, during riots in September 2009 stating that "This guy [Jassar], he escaped from prison. People facilitated his escape, he is gone," and that "He seized the opportunity of the riots in the prison in September 2009 and he escaped. He was the only one who escaped". The minister also added that he discovered Jassar's escape about "20 or 30 days ago."

== See also ==
- List of people who disappeared mysteriously (2000–present)
- Paul Marshall Johnson, Jr.
- Eugene Armstrong
- Jack Hensley
- Kim Sun-il
- Kenneth Bigley
- Shosei Koda
- Nick Berg
- Marla Ruzicka
- Piotr Stańczak
- Daniel Pearl
- Occupation of Iraq (2003–2011)
