= Beheading by Salafi jihadist groups =

Terrorist and propagandist actions

Extremist Salafi jihadist groups such as ISIS and al-Qaeda have used beheading as a method of killing captives. Since 2002, ISIS have circulated beheading videos as a form of terror and propaganda. Their actions have been condemned by militant and other terrorist groups, as well as by mainstream Islamic scholars and organizations.

== History ==
Modern instances of beheadings by Salafi jihadist groups date at least to the early 1990s.

=== 1990s ===
At the beginning of the Bosnian War (1992–95), anywhere from 500 to 6,000 foreign volunteers (mostly from the Gulf States, the Levant, and South Asia) travelled to Bosnia (with the support of the Croatian government at the time) to volunteer for jihad and fight alongside the Bosniaks, who were being heavily persecuted. Most came into Bosnia and Herzegovina under the guise of being volunteer aid workers and freelance journalists, complete with fake identification cards and passports. When they arrived in Bosnia, they formed a volunteer brigade called the El-Mudžahid along with some local Bosniak volunteers, and were affiliated with the 3rd Corps (although they weren't officially absorbed into the Bosnian Army, and also had quite a bit of internal conflict and strife amongst the two organizations due to differing views on Islam, culture, and politics). The El-Mudžahid were notorious for their brutal tactics and ferocious fighting on the battlefield, along with how they treated their POW's. There were several cases of decapitation that happened to POW's, along with being tortured severely before-hand. In the most famous case, there is an amateur video (along with a photo) taken of a foreign fighter decapitating and holding the severed head of a Serb POW up to the camera. Before the subsequent video was taken, 2 Serb POW's (Momir Mitrović and Predrag Knežević) were captured, subjected to severe beatings and had their hands and feet bound together for hours on end. After beating and torturing the prisoners for hours, the foreign fighter slit the throats of the two Serb POW's and then proceeded to decapitate them, to which after they held the head of one of the POW's up in "celebration".

In the First Chechen War (1994–96), the beheading of Yevgeny Rodionov, a Russian soldier who refused to convert to Islam, led some within the Russian Orthodox Church to venerate him as a martyr.

In 1997, the Armed Islamic Group of Algeria beheaded 80-200 villagers in Benthalia.

=== 2000s ===
The 2002 beheading of American journalist Daniel Pearl by Al-Qaeda member Khalid Sheikh Mohammed in Pakistan drew international attention enhanced by the release of a beheading video. Revulsion in the Muslim community led al Qaeda to abandon video beheadings. Groups in Iraq led by Abu Musab al-Zarqawi, Tawhid and Jihad and later ISIL, continued the practice. Since 2002, they have been mass circulating beheading videos as a form of terror and propaganda. One of ISIS's founder and leader's, Abu Mosab al-Zarqawi's most publicized murders was that of American Nick Berg.

Since 2004 insurgents in South Thailand began to sow fear in attacks where men and women of the local Buddhist minority were beheaded. On 18 July 2005 two terrorists entered a teashop in South Thailand, shot Lek Pongpla, a Buddhist cloth vendor, beheaded him and left the head outside of the shop. The founder of Bridges TV, a Muslim cable channel in originally based in Buffalo, NY that aimed to combat negative perceptions of Muslims that were allegedly dominating mainstream media coverage, beheaded his wife in 2009 in the offices of Bridges TV.

=== 2010s ===
In January 2015, a copy of an ISIL penal code surfaced describing the penalties it enforces in areas under its control, including beheadings. Beheading videos have been frequently posted by ISIL members to social media. Several of the videoed beheadings were conducted by Mohammed Emwazi, whom the media had referred to as "Jihadi John" before his identification.

The beheadings received wide coverage around the world and attracted international condemnation. Political scientist Max Abrahms posited that ISIL may be using well-publicized beheadings as a means of differentiating itself from Al-Qaeda in Iraq (AQI), and identifying itself with Khalid Sheikh Mohammed, the al-Qaeda member who beheaded Daniel Pearl. Beheadings represent a small proportion of a larger total of people killed following capture by ISIL.

=== 2020s ===
In 2020 in Éragny-sur-Oise, France, school teacher Samuel Paty, was beheaded with a cleaver, by Abdoullakh Abouyezidovich Anzorov an 18 year old Russian-Muslim refugee of Chechen ethnicity. Paty's killer was allegedly enraged by Paty showing students Charlie Hebdo's 2012 cartoons depicting the Islamic prophet Muhammad in class.

On 28 June 2022, a Hindu tailor Kanhaiya Lal, was beheaded by two Muslims who approached his shop posing as customers. The motive behind the killing was Lal's alleged sharing of a social media post in support of Bharatiya Janata Party (BJP) spokesperson Nupur Sharma, who had fallen into controversy with angry Islamists for making offensive remarks about the Islamic prophet Muhammad on a debate show, in reply to derogatory comments first made about the Hindu god Shiva, by her on-panel Muslim adversary.

Over fifty people were beheaded by Islamic terrorists in the Cabo Delgado Province of Mozambique in early November 2020.

== Condemnation by Muslims ==
Mainstream Islamic scholars and organizations around the world, as well as designated terror organizations such as Hezbollah, Hamas, Al-Qaeda and the Taliban have condemned the practice.

== Academic perspectives ==
According to Peter R. Neumann, Director of the International Centre for the Study of Radicalisation and Political Violence at King's College London, viral beheading videos are intended, and are at least somewhat effective, as a recruiting tool for jihad among both Western and Middle Eastern youth. Other observers argue that while Al Qaeda initially used beheading as a publicity tool, it later decided that they caused Muslims to recoil from Islamism and that although ISIS/IS is enthusiastically deploying beheading as a tactic in 2014, it, too, may find that the tactic backfires. Timothy R. Furnish, as assistant professor of Islamic History, contrasts the Saudi government executions, conforming to standards that minimize pain, with the non-state actors who have "chosen a slow, torturous sawing method to terrorize the Western audience."

== Impact on war coverage ==
Some analysts have argued that the beheadings of journalists and aid workers, along with other abductions and executions of independent observers in Syrian war zones, have forced international media to rely exclusively on reporting which is directly or indirectly influenced by rebel and opposition groups and in this way allowed the latter to dictate the coverage of events in areas under their control.

== See also ==
- Islamic State beheading incidents
- Reign of Terror
