= Killing of Seif Adnan Kanaan =

Seif Adnan Kanaan (died 22 October 2004) was an Iraqi citizen who was abducted in Iraq and beheaded on 22 October 2004. The reason given by the kidnappers, the Army of Ansar Al-Sunna, was that he was employed by the United States Army.

== Murder ==
On 22 October 2004, a video was posted on the website of the Army of Ansar Al-Sunna, apparently showed the beheading of Kanaan. Kanaan was shown in a picture surrounded by the three hooded gunmen with a banner of the Army of Ansar Al-Sunna in the background. They accused him of being an American spy recruited in Mosul. In the video the man makes a statement: "My name is Seif Adnan Kanaan. I work at Mosul airport... My second job is to supply beverages to the US army".

One of the gunmen then reads a statement saying that "the mujahedeen (Islamic fighters) in Mosul were able to capture ... a crusader spy recruited by US forces to spy and inform on the mujahedeen in Mosul." The gunman said the purported spy worked at a US base in Mosul airport and "was known for his allegiance to the Americans and his hatred for the mujahedeen." He had "publicly insulted (Islam's) Prophet Mohammed...We tell people like him: the door of repentance is open... Announce your repentance and live in peace among your kin," the gunman said. He then warned that "The mujahedeen will catch those who persist in working with US forces, and settle for nothing less than beheading them."

Kanaan was beheaded after "confessing to all the actions he carried out." The group also posted the statement on its website, accompanied by pictures of the beheading. The video showed the man who read the statement later beheading the victim with a knife. He placed the head on the back of the victim, who lay in a pool of blood. The man had been killed "to serve as a lesson for others," the murderer said.

== See also ==
- Iraq
  - 2003 invasion of Iraq
  - Abu Ghraib prisoner abuse
  - Human rights situation in post-Saddam Iraq
- Decapitation
  - Daniel Pearl
  - Nick Berg
  - Paul Marshall Johnson, Jr.
  - Eugene Armstrong
  - Kim Sun-il
  - Kenneth Bigley
  - Piotr Stańczak
  - Jack Hensley
  - Shosei Koda
