= Steven Sotloff =

American journalist (1983–2014)

- סטיבן סוטלוף
- Undated photo of Sotloff
- Born: Steven Joel Sotloff; May 11, 1983; Miami, Florida, U.S.
- Disappeared: August 4, 2013; Aleppo, Syria
- Died: c. September 2, 2014 (aged 31); Syrian Desert
- Cause of death: Decapitation by ISIS
- Citizenship: United States; Israel
- Education: Interdisciplinary Center Herzliya
- Occupation: Journalist
- Employer: Time

Steven Joel Sotloff (Hebrew: סטיבן סוטלוף; May 11, 1983 – c. September 2, 2014) was an American-Israeli journalist. In August 2013, he was kidnapped in Aleppo, Syria, and held captive by militants from the Islamic State of Iraq and Syria (ISIS). On September 2, 2014, ISIS released a beheading video, showing one of its members beheading Sotloff. Following Sotloff's beheading, U.S. President Barack Obama stated that the United States would take action to "degrade and destroy" ISIS. President Obama also signed an Executive Order dated June 24, 2015, in the presence of the Sotloff family and other hostage families, overhauling how the U.S. handles American hostages held abroad by groups such as ISIS.

The capture and beheading of Steven Sotloff, and of fellow journalist James Foley a month prior, initiated broad public awareness of ISIL/ISIS after the beheadings were shown on the Internet and then on international television. Sotloff's legacy is in part that he broke the Benghazi story to CNN, that there was no protest, and that he foresaw the massive Syrian Refugee Crisis as he reported on the everyday people's suffering in Syria, thus earning him the reputation as "The Voice for the Voiceless."

== Early life and education ==
Steven Sotloff was the son of Jewish parents Arthur and Shirley Sotloff of Pinecrest, Florida, a suburb of Miami, and a grandson of Holocaust survivors, who inspired him to be "a voice for the voiceless." He was the brother of Lauren Sotloff. He grew up in Pinecrest, graduated from Rumsey Hall School, Kimball Union Academy, and later attended (but did not graduate from) the University of Central Florida with a major in journalism from 2002 to 2004. He transferred to the Interdisciplinary Center Herzliya in Israel from 2005 to 2008, graduating cum laude with a major in government studies and counter-terrorism.

Sotloff emigrated to Israel after a Birthright trip inspired him to fall in love with the country, and held citizenship of both the United States and Israel, although his Jewish background and Israeli citizenship were not made public during his work in Muslim countries or during his captivity for fear that the information might endanger his release. Sotloff had significant interest in the Middle East and its culture and travelled to Yemen to study Arabic.

== Career ==
According to Al-Jazeera, Sotloff was in Qatar and wrote a letter of application dated May 29, 2010, to the Arabic for Non Native Speakers (ANNS) faculty at Qatar University. He later traveled around the region with a Yemeni mobile number. His career began during the Arab Spring. Sotloff had worked for the news magazine Time, as well as The Christian Science Monitor, The National Interest, The Media Line, The Jerusalem Report, World Affairs, and Foreign Policy, and had appeared on CNN and Fox News. His work took him to Syria a number of times, as well as Egypt, Turkey, Libya, and Bahrain.

Sotloff was the reporter who broke the Benghazi story, affirming to CNN that there was no protest that caused the killings and destruction, as U.S. media had initially reported. His greatly detailed story was hailed as "an excellent piece of journalism" by CNN's Suzanne Malveaux.

In 2012, he reported in Time magazine about Al-Qaeda fighters and commanders from Libya flocking to Syria and shipping Libyan captured arms and ammunition on its way to join the fight to topple Bashar al-Assad's regime. He was also one of a team of reporters who returned to the compound in Benghazi where the US ambassador and three other Americans had been killed on the night of 9/11 that year. He interviewed Libyan security guards who were at the site during the attack. He named a Libyan militia operative, Ahmad Abu Khattallah, as the head of the group (Ansar al-Sharia) that attacked the US compound and as the man who himself masterminded and led the attack. He later reported on a tit-for-tat retaliation pattern following the US attacks on those who committed the attack on the ambassador's compound in Benghazi. A week before entering Libya, he had written from Turkey about the Alawites there and their support for Assad while another article written on the same day told about Alawites inside Syria who were against Assad. According to Ann Marlowe, who worked with Sotloff in Libya, "he lived in Yemen for years, spoke good Arabic, deeply loved (the) Islamic world".

Sotloff's journalistic work in Syria interviewing the everyday people, whose suffering led to the massive Syrian Refugee Crisis, is in large part what earned him the title of "The Voice for the Voiceless" by Time, The Daily Telegraph, and NBC News. He was described by those who knew him as a gentle man who "was driven to report on the humanitarian dimensions of the conflicts in the Middle East, humbly referring to himself as a "stand-up philosopher from Miami".

Janine Di Giovanni, the Middle East editor of Newsweek, told CNN, "He was concerned that he had been on some kind of a list, and this had been around the time that ISIS had been showing up and taking over checkpoints that had been manned before by the rebels. And he thought he had angered some of the rebels, he didn't know which ones, by taking footage of a hospital in Aleppo that had been bombed, and he had been very concerned about this."

== Kidnapping and beheading ==
On July 15, 2013, Sotloff arrived in Israel for his former roommate Benny Scholder's wedding and wanted to spend a couple of weeks there. Before his kidnapping, he was in Kilis, a town at the border of Turkey and Syria. During a talk with Ben Taub, a journalist and philosophy student at Princeton University, he confessed to being tired of the Middle East, that he was "sick of being beaten up, and shot at, and accused of being a spy." His intention was to stop reporting and come back to the United States, but he wanted one more tour of Syria first. According to Taub's statement, it is likely that Sotloff's fixer was being monitored by ISIS.

Sotloff was kidnapped along with his fixer and the fixer's brother and cousins on August 4, 2013, near Aleppo after crossing the Syrian border from Turkey. The fixer and his family members were released 15 days later. He was thought to have been held in Raqqa. Sotloff fasted secretly during the Jewish fast day of Yom Kippur in September 2013 during his captivity, by feigning illness.

His family kept the news of his kidnapping secret, fearing he would be harmed if they went public. His family and government agencies worked privately to gain his release for a year.

Sotloff, his family, friends, and previous employers such as The Jerusalem Post went to great lengths to keep his Jewish background and Israeli citizenship a secret from his ISIL captors after Sotloff was shown in the beheading video of James Foley. It is unknown if those attempts had any effect, since the information was online for the duration of his captivity. Following Sotloff's death in September, ISIS published 11 rules that pertained to journalists "who wish to continue working in the governorate." The first rule stated that all journalists must swear their allegiance as subjects of the Islamic State.

On August 19, 2014, Islamic State released a video titled "A Message to America," which showed the beheading of fellow journalist James Foley. At the end of the video, ISIS threatened President of the United States Barack Obama, telling him that "his next move" would decide the fate of Sotloff.

Only days after this threat was released, the U.S. stepped up airstrikes against IS, firing 14 missiles at various ISIS Humvees near the Mosul Dam.

Shortly after the release of the video, a petition was started on whitehouse.gov, which called for President Obama to save Sotloff's life. The petition attracted thousands of signatures within days. On August 27, 2014, Sotloff's mother released a short video asking Islamic State leader Abu Bakr al-Baghdadi to release her son. Fellow journalists, including Sotloff's friend Oren Kessler, worked intensively for his release.

On September 2, 2014, the SITE Intelligence Group discovered the video of Sotloff's killing, titled "A Second Message to America" and released by Al-Furqan Media Productions, on what they called "a file-sharing site" and released it to their subscribers.

== Tributes ==
After Sotloff's beheading, tributes flooded in to his family from all over the world, including from the Vatican and Pope Francis, Prime Minister of Israel Benjamin Netanyahu, President Barack Obama, U.S. senators Bill Nelson and Marco Rubio and the Consul General of Israel to Florida and Puerto Rico. He was memorialized by the U.S. Congress in the Congressional Record. The Architect of the Capitol gave his family a flag that was flown over the U.S. Capitol. The New York Times set up a Legacy Guest Book in Sotloff's honor that would remain open permanently. American musician Dave Matthews and his Dave Matthews Band planted 120 trees in Israel in Sotloff's memory, and Matthews personally dedicated his song "Mercy" to Sotloff.

== Awards ==
Sotloff won numerous awards and honors both during his life and posthumously:

- The ADL Daniel Pearl Award (1963–2002) – given to journalists who have or had a commitment to build cultural bridges and promote understanding. The ADL Daniel Pearl Award recognizes those who, like Daniel Pearl, have attempted to understand developments on the ground and the perceptions of those who are living through the region's seismic changes. Despite the inherent risks of [his] chosen profession, [he] remained tirelessly committed to "finding the humanity behind the headlines" in Syria and Iraq.
- The Radio Television Digital News Foundation (RTDNF)'s Citation of Courage Award – given for the first time ever when presented to Steven Sotloff and James Foley, in recognition of distinguished service to journalism and the extraordinary courage to face danger in search of the truth ... [making] the ultimate sacrifice in pursuit of free and unfettered journalism in the war-torn Syrian region.
- The American Society of Journalists and Authors (ASJA)'s Conscience-in-Media Award – for commitment to the highest principles of journalism at notable personable cost, "The Conscience in Media award recognizes journalists who knowingly have endured great personal costs while pursuing the highest tenets of their profession."
- The Foundation for Defense of Democracies Tribute – FDD's scholars, one of whom was Steven, "believe that no one should be denied basic human rights including freedom of religion, speech and assembly; that no one should be discriminated against on the basis of race, color, religion, sex or national origin; that free and democratic nations have a right to defend themselves and an obligation to defend one another; and that terrorism – unlawful and premeditated violence against civilians to instill fear and coerce governments or societies – is always wrong and should never be condoned."
- The Southeastern Association of Journalists's Turkey's Special Prize of the Jury – given for their traditional "Year's Successful Journalists."
- The Anti-Defamation League (ADL), Florida Heroes Award – awarded by CNN's Larry King, given for Sotloff's "demonstration of tremendous courage, compassion, and determination in confronting hate and intolerance."

== Memorials ==
The Steven Sotloff Art Memorial, created by American artist Tracy Ellyn, first opened publicly just days after President Barack Obama toasted to the memory of the slain journalist at the White House Correspondents Dinner of 2015, and just one day after Sotloff's birthday. It currently overlooks the Atlantic Ocean at Greenspoon Marder Law Foundation in Fort Lauderdale, Florida, where viewers can face the Middle East in his memory, as his remains were never returned. Another original of the same memorial is placed at Temple Beth Am in Miami, Florida, where he and his family were and continue to be members.

The memorial, filled with metaphor and symbolism, contains in its layers some excerpts from the letter that Sotloff smuggled out to his family while held in captivity, when he realized he may not make it out alive. Some of those words are: "Do what makes you happy. Be where you are happy. Love and respect each other. Don't fight over nonsense. Hug each other every day. Eat dinner together. Live your life to the fullest and pray to be happy. Stay positive and patient. Everyone has two lives; the 2nd one begins when you realize you have only one."

Another memorial, the Steven Sotloff Memorial Garden, spearheaded by Mayor Cindy Lerner of Pinecrest, Florida, is a public place of reflection where Sotloff's family and the public can go and pay their respects to their son. They chose the site in the village of Pinecrest because they had taken Steven Sotloff to the site as a child when it was Parrot Jungle. The Miami Foundation and Home Depot were involved in its creation.

== Foundation ==
After Sotloff's death, the Steven Joel Sotloff Memorial 2LIVES Foundation was created. Its name is taken from a line in the letter he smuggled out to his family during captivity, "Everyone has two lives; the 2nd one begins when you realize you have only one." It aims to train and support journalists working in conflict regions around the world. It provides scholarships for journalism students around the world. Scholarships have already been set up in Sotloff's name at Kimball Union Academy in New Hampshire, University of Central Florida, and University of Miami.

The foundation has also worked with the U.S. government and senior officials to push for changes to its hostage policies. In 2015, following lobbying by the foundation, president Barack Obama signed an Executive Order stating that negotiations with hostage-takers would be permitted, and families of hostages would not be prosecuted if they sought to pay a ransom.

== Lawsuit ==
On April 20, 2016, it was announced that Sotloff's family were seeking $90 million in damages from Syria in U.S. court. The family claims the Assad government provided support for the Islamic State of Iraq and the Levant which was responsible for his murder.

== See also ==
- 2014 American-led intervention in Iraq
- ISIL beheading incidents
- Beheading in Islamism
- David Cawthorne Haines
- Foreign hostages in Iraq
- James Foley (journalist) (1973–2014)
- Nick Berg (1978–2004)
- Kenneth Bigley
- John Cantlie (born 1970)
- Austin Tice (born 1981)
- Daniel Pearl (1963–2002)
- The Beatles (terrorist cell), terrorist cell of the Islamic State that guarded and beheaded Sotloff
- Mohammed Emwazi (nicknamed "Jihadi John" by the press), Kuwaiti-British terrorist who beheaded Sotloff

== Sources ==
- "The Life and Death of Steven Sotloff," Jonathan Zalman, Tablet, 18 June 2015.
