= Killing of Paul Johnson =

American helicopter engineer (1955-2004)

Paul Marshall Johnson
- Johnson on left
- Born: May 8, 1955; Eagleswood, New Jersey, U.S.
- Died: c. June 18, 2004 (aged 49); Riyadh, Riyadh Province, Saudi Arabia
- Occupation: Engineer
- Known for: Murder victim of Al Qaeda

Paul Marshall Johnson Jr. (May 8, 1955 – c. June 18, 2004) was an American helicopter engineer who lived in Saudi Arabia. In 2004, he was taken hostage by militants and his murder was recorded on video tape.

== Background ==
Johnson was born in Eagleswood Township, New Jersey. He graduated from Southern Regional High School in 1973.

== Abduction and death ==
On June 12, 2004, Johnson, who worked for Lockheed Martin on upgrading Saudi AH-64A Apache attack helicopters, was stopped at a fake police checkpoint near Riyadh and then abducted. His kidnappers called themselves Al-Qaeda in the Arabian Peninsula. The group, headed by Abdel Aziz al-Muqrin, posted a video of a blindfolded Johnson on an Islamist website on June 15, 2004 and threatened to kill him unless all al-Qaeda prisoners were released from Saudi jails within 72 hours.

Immediately after the video was released, American and Saudi Arabian authorities began to deal with the hostage situation. Both the United States and Saudi Arabia asserted that they would not comply with the kidnappers' demands. Those demands included, but were not limited to, releasing all militants being held in Saudi custody. The video was released on the same day that Crown Prince Abdullah promised to step up security and investigations against militant Islamic groups in Saudi Arabia.

One of Johnson's Saudi colleagues, Abdullah Al-Momin, published a petition message to the kidnappers through Al-Arabiya TV. He asked them in the name of Islam to free Johnson as he has nothing to do with the American military. "If they are really Muslims they should release him," Abdullah said.

Johnson's abduction came during increased violence against foreigners in Saudi Arabia. The previous week, BBC journalists Frank Gardner and Simon Cumbers had been shot, and two other Americans had also been shot in Riyadh.

Sultan Al Haseri was later to be described as taking a role in Johnson's kidnapping and murder. He was subsequently listed on Saudi Arabia's list of most wanted terrorist suspects and killed in a shootout in July 2005.

== Videotaped killing ==
At 17:30 UTC on June 18, Al-Arabiya and CNN reported that Johnson had been decapitated. This report was based on three photographs of the murder posted on the Internet. Saudi officials initially claimed to have discovered Johnson's body near Riyadh later that day, but the statements were withdrawn the following day on June 19. The Saudi government withheld official proclamation of Johnson's death until the body was found. In the murder video, after making the statements, the next shot is the execution already in progress. He is lying on a bed with what appears to be three men holding him down as one militant severs his head. Unlike the Nick Berg and Eugene Armstrong videos, there is no screaming. The video was also similar to that of Daniel Pearl, who was killed in Pakistan in 2002, and Kim Sun-il, a South Korean translator who was killed in Iraq during the same month not long after Johnson was killed in Saudi Arabia.

HostingAnime, the company which hosts images and video of his murder, have defended showing his execution.

On July 21, 2004, Saudi security officials found Johnson's head in a refrigerator in the residence of Issa Al-Khalidi, following a shootout in Riyadh with Saudi security forces in which Al-Khalidi was killed. Issa's brothers, Abd Al Aziz Sad Muhaamad Awshan Al-Khalidi and Suleyman Saaed Mohammed Al-Khalidi, were later detainees at the Guantanamo Bay detention camp.

== See also ==
- Daniel Pearl
- Decapitation
- Foreign hostages in Iraq
- Eugene Armstrong
- Nick Berg
- Steven Vincent
- Kim Sun-il
- Jack Hensley
- List of solved missing person cases (2000s)
- Kenneth Bigley
- Piotr Stanczak
- Shosei Koda
- Margaret Hassan
- Seif Adnan Kanaan
