= A Second Message to America =

ISIS beheading video

A Second Message to America is an undated beheading video, depicting the execution of Steven Sotloff, published by the Islamic State media department Al-Furqan Media Productions.

== Synopsis ==
On September 2, 2014, the SITE Intelligence Group discovered the video of Sotloff's execution on what they called "a file-sharing site" and released it to their subscribers.

The video opens with a news clip of a press conference of an August 20 speech by American president Barack Obama (Note: Barack Obama: "The United States of America will continue to do what we must do to protect our people. We will be vigilant and we will be relentless. When people harm Americans anywhere, we do what's necessary to see that justice is done and we act against ISIL, standing alongside others.") denouncing IS for the beheading of journalist James Foley followed by a title screen. The video then shows Sotloff, wearing an orange jumpsuit kneeling with his hands behind his back and a wireless microphone in a desert background. To his right is a figure dressed head-to-toe in black, holding a knife in his left hand and wearing a pistol in a holster, who was later identified as Mohammed Emwazi (Jihadi John), the same person that killed James Foley. Then Sotloff delivers a prepared statement:

I am Steven Joel Sotloff. I'm sure you know exactly who I am by now and why I am appearing before you. And now this time for my message:

Obama, your foreign policy of intervention in Iraq was supposed to be for the preservation of American lives and interests, so why is it that I am paying the price of your interference with my life. Am I not an American citizen? You've spent billions of U.S. tax payers dollars and we've lost thousands of our troops in our previous fighting against the Islamic State, so where is the people's interest in reigniting this war?

From what little I know about foreign policy, I remember a time you could not win an election without promising to bring our troops back home from Iraq and Afghanistan and to close down Guantanamo. Here you are now, Obama, nearing the end of your term, and having achieving none of the above, and deceivingly marching us the American people in the blazing fire.

Next the executioner says while waving the knife at the camera:

I'm back, Obama, and I'm back because of your arrogant foreign policy towards the Islamic State, because of your insistence on continuing your bombings in Amerli, Zammar and the Mosul Dam, despite our serious warnings. You, Obama, have yet again, through your actions killed yet another American citizen. So just as your missiles continue to strike our people, our knife will continue to strike the necks of your people...[points knife at Sotloff's neck] We take this opportunity to warn those governments that enter this evil alliance of America against the Islamic State to back off and leave our people alone!

The executioner then puts his right hand on Sotloff's chin and the knife to his throat and begins a sawing motion while Sotloff flinches then falls back. The video fades to black without showing any blood. Next the camera pans left to right as it shows Sotloff's body on the ground with his bloody head on top of his headless body. Jeff Smith, Associate Director of the CU Denver National Center for Media Forensics, opines that while the body shown in the later frames of the video is real, the footage of the beheading itself is likely staged. Smith further remarks that the video was of a high production value, and was likely overseen by a director, shot with multiple cameras, and skillfully edited with modern equipment.

In the scene following Steven's execution, the same executioner is shown holding another prisoner, British aid worker David Cawthorne Haines, and saying "We take this opportunity to warn those governments that enter this evil alliance of America against the Islamic State to back off and leave our people alone."

== See also ==
- Beheading in Islam
- Foreign hostages in Iraq
- Letter to Baghdadi
- Letter to the American People
- Reign of Terror
