= Piotr Stańczak =

Polish geologist (1966–2009)

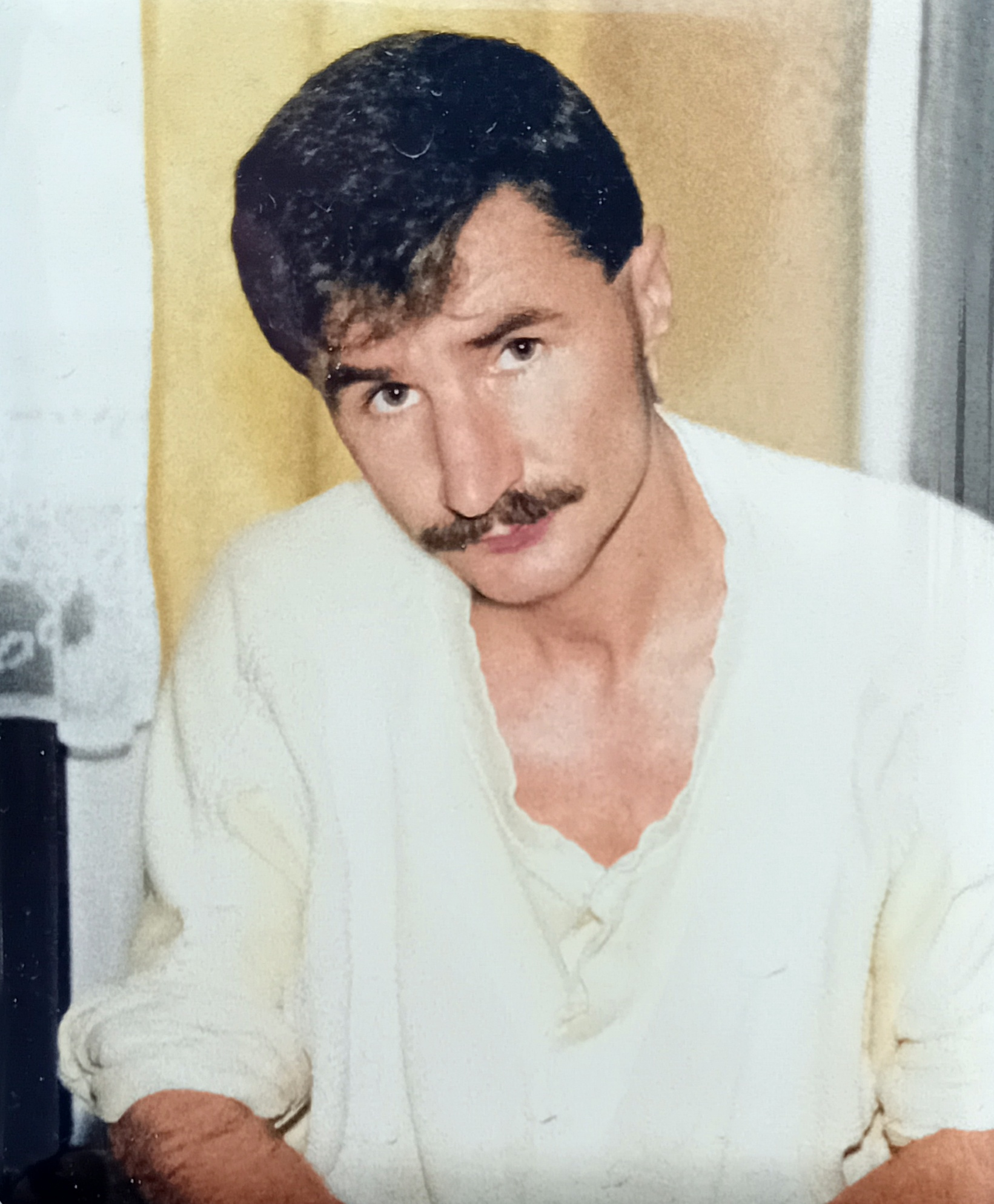
- Born: 23 July 1966; Potok, Poland
- Died: 7 February 2009; Razmak, Pakistan
- Known for: Being beheaded by Pakistani terrorists
- Awards: Order of Polonia Restituta (2010)
- Scientific career
- Fields: Geology
- Workplaces: Quaid-i-Azam University

Piotr Stańczak (23 July 1966 – 7 February 2009) was a Polish geologist. In February 2009, he was abducted and beheaded in Pakistan by Islamist terrorists, the Tariq Gidar Group.

== Abduction ==
Stańczak was abducted in the city of Attock in September 2008 after gunmen shot dead his driver, translator and bodyguard with whom he was travelling in a car. His murderers, the Tariq Gidar Group linked to the Pakistani Taliban, said they murdered him because the Pakistani government failed to release Taliban prisoners. Officials at the Polish Embassy in Islamabad saw the video of the murder and confirmed that the person who was murdered was Piotr Stańczak.

== Murder ==
The taped murder was reminiscent of the beheading in 2002 of Daniel Pearl, at that time the last Westerner to be murdered on video in Pakistan. Stańczak was allegedly offered the opportunity to avoid death by converting to Islam. When Stańczak refused, he was forced to read statements before his murder. The video shows Stańczak asking the Polish government not to send troops to Afghanistan, which later leads to the masked men cutting off Stańczak's head.

== Aftermath ==
Stańczak's body was later recovered outside a paramilitary camp in Razmak and returned to Poland aboard a Pakistani Air Force plane. A brief ceremony was held on the tarmac.

The Polish government issued international arrest warrants for the murderers, in addition to offering a 1 million złoty (about $290,000 USD) reward for information that would lead to the arrest of the suspects. Warsaw also "categorically demands from Pakistan's authorities the capture of the culprits of this crime and their punishment with the full severity this act demands", according to a statement released by the Polish Foreign Ministry. Poland requested help from the United States in their efforts to catch the killers.

On July 25, 2009, Pakistani police arrested a former parliamentarian with close links to the Taliban, Shah Abdul Aziz, in connection with the murder of Stańczak. A captured member of the Taliban told an anti-terrorism court that he was given orders by Aziz to kill Stańczak.

On September 30, 2010, the President of Poland posthumously awarded him the Officer's Cross of the Order of Polonia Restituta.

In November 2017 another Al-Qaeda commander responsible for multiple kidnappings, including Stańczak, was arrested in Afghanistan.

== See also ==
- Foreign hostages in Afghanistan
- Nick Berg
- Paul Marshall Johnson Jr.
- Eugene Armstrong
- Kim Sun-il
- Kenneth Bigley
- Shosei Koda
- Margaret Hassan
- Seif Adnan Kanaan
