= The Media Line =

American nonprofit news agency

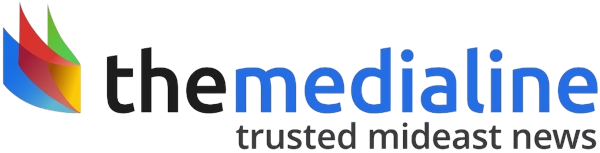
- Formation: 2000
- Founder: Felice Friedson
- Legal status: News agency, nonprofit organization
- Location: New York City, United States
- Region served: Middle East
- Revenue: ▼$1,687,585 (2023)
- Website: themedialine.org

The Media Line (TML) is an American news agency and a nonprofit organization established in 2000 by Felice Friedson to cover news from the Middle East. Some of the agency's reports are republished by mainstream media outlets.

== History ==
The Media Line was established by Felice Friedson in 2000 as a nonprofit news agency with the goal of covering news in the Middle East. Prior to that that, Friedson and her husband Michael operated a radio program in Florida that specialized in covering news of Israel and other Middle Eastern countries; the station was the precursor of TML.

In a 2010 interview with The Jerusalem Post, Friedson said that she views TML as a "small AP or Reuters, as a service". She said that unlike other news services, TML is not intended to be global, and only reports on the Middle East. Friedson said that TML does not have an editorial stance and seeks to report only the facts. She also said the agency was funded by membership donations and multiple foundations, and declines funding from parties hoping to push an agenda. She rejected the interviewer's suggestion that her organization was linked to "evangelical groups", saying "the majority of the entities we work with are secular", despite its content also being distributed within different religious "niche markets". TML is one of the first news agencies in America made with the purpose of providing news from the Middle East.

In 2007, Los Angeles Times said that TML's editorial stance is centrist. On October 10, 2012, newspaper National Post announced an addition of a new online channel named "Israel and the Middle East" to its World section. The channel featured news and videos created by TML journalists from Middle Eastern nations; some of TML's reports also appeared in the print newspaper. In 2015, it was reported that 10 freelance journalists and six reporters of TML operating in the Middle East, Canada and United States are sharing their reports with mainstream media outlets. According to HonestReporting, news of TML are regularly republished by mainstream media outlets.

In January 2019, Friedson stated in an interview that TML is active in Israel and Palestine and explained that the goal of the agency is to "build understanding" of the Middle East. On April 8, 2019, TML announced that it had revamped its website and added various new features including 3 new sections.

== Activities ==
Felice Friedson founded The Mideast Press Club in 2005, a project of TML created to promote co-operation between Israeli and Palestinian journalists. More than 200 Palestinian and Israeli journalists were reported to have joined the project. The Mideast Press Club organized a number of meetings, one was held in Knesset building in 2010 where dozens of journalists discussed politics of Israel with various MKs. The event was held by politician Tzahi Hanegbi with the approval of president Reuven Rivlin. In a 2010 interview, Friedson said the project was successful and described it as "an American success story".

In 2012, Steven Sotloff, a journalist kidnapped by ISIS in 2013 and beheaded by them in 2014, joined TML as a freelancer. The last article Soltoff wrote for the agency before his disappearance was published on August 6, 2013. Felice Friedson read excerpts from Soltoff's articles at a meeting of Overseas Press Club in 2017 and also told his life story. She and her husband Michael Friedson also attended his memorial in 2025.

In April 2020, University of Nebraska–Lincoln announced partnership with TML to educate its students studying journalism in the Middle East. The university also said that certain selected students will be able to write news articles for TML under the agency's supervision. According to Friedson, TML has educated 40 students within a span of a decade and has also partnered with six other universities. She said the universities are located all over the world, and that TML mentors can remotely communicate with students.
