= Martyrdom video =

Intentional recording of suicide attack

Martyrdom videos are video recordings, mainly from Islamist jihadists, of a suicide attack, done by "martyrs" who are expected to die during their intended actions, usually via suicide bombing. They typically include a statement by the person preparing to be a martyr for their cause. They can be either amateur or professional quality, often incorporating text, music, and sentimental clips. The people in these videos typically sit or stand in front of a black Islamic flag, in their explosive-rigged vehicles (in cases of IS, Al-Nusra Front, Imam Bukhari Jamaat, and other Islamist groups), or media (in case of IS showing two teen suicide bombers by Al-Jazeera in Afghanistan) or other symbol of their allegiance. Suicide bombers considered themselves religiously justified by sharia and consider themselves to be shahid.

Such videos are widely circulated for propaganda purposes following the event by the groups behind them. Martyrdom videos are designed to be used as psychological weapons as their primary purpose is to establish validity for their actions, inspire fear in enemies, or spread their ideology for political or religious ambitions.

== Religious justification of suicide bombings ==
Martyrdom videos base their product on the religious justifiability of their actions; namely martyrdom operations, more commonly known to non-extremists as suicide attacks. Verses from the Qur'an are regularly cited in martyrdom videos to provide religious justification. Suicide is condemned in Islam according to the Qur'an, whereas martyrdom is praised. Also, fellow Muslims are not to be attacked or they commit fitna.

"You shall spend in the cause of Allah; do not throw yourselves with your own hands into destruction. You shall be charitable; Allah loves the charitable." —Qur'an 2:195

"Let those fight in the way of Allah who sell the life of this world for the other. Whoso fight in the way of Allah, be he slain or be he victorious, on him We shall bestow a vast reward." —Qur'an 4:74

Suicide bombers do not see their act as an act of suicide but of martyrdom. This point is clearly stated in a martyrdom video by Dani Dwi Permana, a suicide bomber in the July 2009 attack in Jakarta, Indonesia, who says

This is not suicide. This is what our enemies fear. It is an obligation for all [Muslims]. Those who do not execute this obligation are sinners.

By declaring his action to be obligatory for Muslims, he is using his martyrdom video to present the religious justification for his action. This view is upheld by many radical scholars’ fatwas. The call against fitna is suspended in radical fatwas as proclaimed by the martyrdom video of Tanvir Hussain

I don’t hold any person to be innocent for the slaughter of the Muslim. Collateral damage is going to be inevitable. People are going to die.

The term martyrdom operations is favoured by extremists, and invariably used in martyrdom videos, as it links the suicide bombing with the Islamic call to jihad and thus justifies them religiously. The religious justifiability of suicide bombing hinges on its applicability to legitimate jihad, which has changed throughout time. Suicide bombings are outlined as acceptable jihad in extremist fatwas, therefore, are acceptable in Islamic law according to extremists. However, suicide bombings are not considered religiously justified by the great majority of the world's Muslims.

== As propaganda ==
A type of propaganda by deed though not necessarily a form of anarchism, martyrdom videos have two propaganda purposes: externally (the enemy) and internally (the Islamic community). The language, style, and messages will differ depending on what audience they are trying to reach. The videos are intended to preserve the memory of their subjects, and to justify and glorify their actions. They may also serve the function of committing their makers to their actions, by making a public statement of commitment that they feel they cannot go back on. Martyrdom videos tend to be more elaborate and show different stages of activity than other terrorist media. Subsequently, military personnel and other victims can piece together informants, collaborators, and techniques based on the propaganda element of the videos.

=== Internal ===
As Robert Pape points out, "Only a community can make a martyr. Using elaborate ceremonies… to identify the death of a suicide attacker with the good of the community, suicide terrorist organizations can promote the idea that their members should be accorded martyr status." In his view, the goal of terrorists employing suicide tactics is to redefine acts of suicide as acts of martyrdom.

Recruitment is a main objective for martyrdom videos. Martyrs videotape themselves giving their reasons for their attack in the hopes of affecting the people of their community or family. Hezbollah is particularly prolific in their production of martyrdom videos to generate support locally.

=== External ===
Martyrdom videos seek to humiliate and demoralize opposition forces. Videos also try to convince would-be martyrs to launch their attacks. Often cited in martyr testimonials is the desire to be freed from the oppression of some external force. Despite massive losses to Al-Qaeda since 2002, they managed to distribute a seven-minute, professionally edited martyrdom video in the hopes of seeking recruits and snubbing the American war effort. Many of the sites that distribute anti-Western or anti-Israeli messages are in Arabic, though it is fairly common to find videos in English, or dubbed into English, to reach a Western audience.

== Stages ==
=== Training stage ===
Martyrdom recruits are often filmed throughout their training. One such video in Pakistan shows a young man telling the camera, "If I die, do not cry for me. I will be in Heaven waiting for you"; he later died in a suicide attack. Humam Khalil Abu Mulal al-Balawi had his martyrdom operation postponed for several days in order to get the necessary footage. The training stage is typically immediately before the event, but some suicide bombers are trained from a very young age.

=== The attack ===
A cameraman is usually near the location of the attack to record the event. Video taped terrorist attacks are distinct from martyrdom videos in they show the action and sequelae, but not the intention. Martyrdom videos are intended to provide justification and reasoning behind the action. IED attacks are likely to be videotaped, as the recording provides evidence of their success. Camera operators have been killed while documenting attacks, with an example being the assassination of Rajiv Gandhi, whereat a camera operator at the scene was killed in the process.

=== Martyr biography ===
Martyrdom videos typically include the name of the insurgent group, a religious message or passage from the Qur’an, a sermon from a notable extremist figurehead or song, and a message from the "martyr" describing their reason(s) and motivation(s) for the attack. Although filmed insurgents engaged in military actions are usually masked, individuals in martyrdom videos are intentionally identifiable. Often, if the attack is not a lone wolf operation, the martyr will appear with a notable extremist.

=== Producers ===
Although many martyrdom videos are self-produced and of low quality, professional-grade martyrdom videos are becoming more common. Local TV stations may air martyrdom videos, although in Pakistan it is illegal to broadcast them. “Filmmaker” has become an explicit job in any major terrorist organizations. Al-Jazeera and the Global Islamic Media Forum (GIMF) are known to broadcast martyrdom videos.

== Cases ==
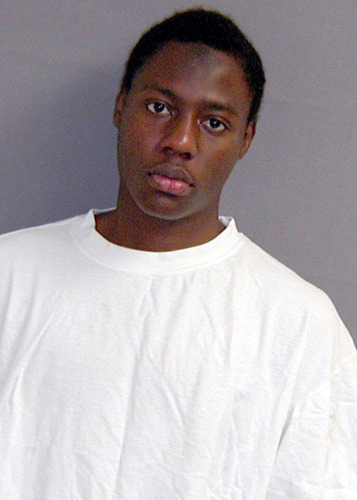
Umar Farouk Abdulmutallab

=== Abdulmutallab case ===
Umar Farouk Abdulmutallab was inspired by Al-Awlaki’s internet writings and traveled to Yemen to meet with Al-Awlaki. After he was deemed to be a suitable suicide bomber, Abdulmutallab was given two weeks of weapons training. He was then taught to use the bomb, which was sewed into his underwear. After the operation was planned, Abdulmutallab was filmed in a 5-minute martyrdom video, which was produced by a professional team.

=== Humam Khalil Abu Mulal al-Balawi case ===
Balawi was caught by Jordanian intelligence and used as a double agent against Baitullah Mehsud. He supposedly made contact with Al-Zawahiri and proposed to meet with the CIA at Camp Chapman. He trained for the attack for a few days and was videotaped. Upon meeting the CIA agents in Afghanistan, he detonated his explosive vest, killing seven. After the attack, Hakimullah Mehsud released his martyrdom video where Balawi proclaimed, "We never forget our martyrs, we never forget our prisoners."

=== Arshad Ali case ===
His martyrdom video is straightforward. He cradles an AK-47, stares into the camera and proclaims that, "some hypocrites say that we are doing this for money- or because of brainwashing- but we are told by Allah to target these pagans," in order to disprove the belief that the families of suicide bombers were paid after the attacks. He then pleads with his father to quit working at the bank as it practices usury, which is against Islam. He finishes by saying, "I invite my fellows to sacrifice themselves." The film switches to the devastation caused by his attack on a polling station in Pakistan. He was 15 years old.

== Reactions ==
=== Negative ===
Eliciting a reaction is the primary ambition for a suicide bombing; videos make the mission objective. Many Islamic scholars refuse to accept the religious justifiability of such operations and thus have negative reactions to the videos. Advocate/scholars promote a wider anti-martyrdom operation and desire to get their message out using the same media as the terrorists. Some people who oppose martyrdom videos have begun making their own videos on YouTube in protest.

=== Encouragement for Murder-Suicide ===
Islamists who seek to become martyrs find motivation and courage to carry out actions from martyrdom videos. Suicide bombings have high symbolic value, which is represented in their martyrdom videos, and serve as symbols of a just struggle, galvanize popular support, generate financial support for the organization and become a source of new recruits for future suicide missions. Some scholars believe the whole of suicide bombing is to gain acceptance by the community, thus the movies aide in gaining the sought after recognition. If unsuccessful, suicide bombers will likely be open to trying again even after seeing footage of the people they would have killed.

==== Criminally sympathetic community reaction example ====
Mahmoud al-Obeid attacked a Jewish settlement in June 2002. His mother, Naima, appeared in her son's martyrdom video and proclaimed, "God willing, you will succeed. May every bullet hit its target, and may God give you martyrdom. This is the best day of my life."

== See also ==
- Beheading video
- Istishhad
- Psychological manipulation
- Radicalization
- Shahid (martyr)
- Snuff film
