= Killing of Shosei Koda =

2004 beheading of Japanese man in Iraq

Shosei Koda
- 香田 証生
- Koda shortly before his beheading
- Born: 29 November 1979; Nōgata, Fukuoka, Japan
- Died: 29 October 2004 (aged 24); Iraq
- Cause of death: Beheading
- Body discovered: Baghdad, Iraq

Shosei Koda (香田 証生, Kōda Shōsei; 29 November 1979 – 29 October 2004) was a Japanese citizen who was kidnapped while touring Iraq and later beheaded in October 2004 by Abu Musab al-Zarqawi's group, al-Qaeda in Iraq. He was the first Japanese person beheaded in Iraq.

== Early life and education ==
Koda was born on 29 November 1979, in Nōgata, Fukuoka. Koda's parents, Setsuko Koda and Masumi Koda, were members of the United Church of Christ. Due to Koda's family affiliation with the United Church of Christ, a cross tattoo was inscribed upon his arm. The family was from Nōgata, Fukuoka, a small southern city in Japan, and his mother was a nurse. Koda dropped out of high school in his junior year before he started working as an interior painter until 2002.

== Kidnapping and death ==
Koda left Amman on 20 October 2004. He ignored advice not to travel to Iraq, and entered the country, because he was curious as to what happened there.

Koda's captors stated that they would "treat him like his predecessors Berg and Bigley" (Bigley was murdered just weeks before by the organization, before it became known as Al Qaeda in Iraq) if Japan did not withdraw its forces from Iraq within 48 hours. The Japanese government headed by Prime Minister Junichiro Koizumi refused to comply with these demands, stating that they will not concede to terrorists.

In the video sequence of Koda's murder, Koda sits on the American flag, his captors standing behind him. Koda's hands are tied behind his back. He is blindfolded while a captor reads out a statement for two minutes and ten seconds. The captors then hold him down on the ground as they begin to decapitate him. Throughout the beheading, "Erhaby Ana (English: I am a Terrorist)", a nasheed, is played. The captors, while beheading Shosei, keep screaming “Allahu Akbar”. The video sequence ends with shots of Koda's severed head on top of his body followed by shots of the banner of al-Qaeda in Iraq. His body was found in Baghdad on 30 October wrapped in an American flag.

== Aftermath ==
Koda's body was returned to Japan. He was given a Christian funeral. The events provoked mixed responses in Japan; while many Japanese citizens were angered and appalled by the murder, some blamed the victim for not heeding the travel advisory and others criticized the Koizumi administration.

== See also ==
- Kenji Goto
- Piotr Stańczak
- Eugene Armstrong
- Paul Marshall Johnson Jr.
- Kim Sun-il
- Jack Hensley
- Daniel Pearl
- Margaret Hassan
- Seif Adnan Kanaan
