= Jama'at al-Tawhid wal-Jihad =

Jordanian-led Salafi jihadist militant group (1999–2004)

- جماعة التوحيد والجهاد
- A flag that was in use by Jama'at al-Tawhid wal Jihad around the late 2004
- Founder: Abu Musab al-Zarqawi
- Leaders: Abu Musab al-Zarqawi; Abu Anas al-Shami †; Omar Husayn Hadid al-Muhammadi
- Dates active: 1999–17 October 2004
- Headquarters: Fallujah
- Active regions: Iraq, limited in Jordan
- Ideology: Qutbism; Salafi Jihadism; Wahhabism; Anti-Shi'ism; Anti-Christianism; Anti-Western sentiment; Anti-Iranian sentiment; Anti-Turkish sentiment

Jama'at al-Tawhid wal-Jihad (Arabic: جماعة التوحيد والجهاد, romanized: Jamā'at al-Tawḥīd wa-l-Jihād, lit. 'Group of Monotheism and Jihad'), abbreviated as JTJ or Jama'at, was a Salafi jihadist militant group. It was founded in Jordan in 1999, and was led by Jordanian national Abu Musab al-Zarqawi for the entirety of its existence. During the Iraqi insurgency (2003–11) the group became a decentralized network with foreign fighters with a considerable Iraqi membership.

On 17 October 2004, al-Zarqawi pledged allegiance to Osama bin Laden, and the group became known as Tanzim Qaidat al-Jihad fi Bilad al-Rafidayn (commonly known as Al-Qaeda in Iraq or Tanzim). After several mergers with other groups and the formation of the Mujahideen Shura Council, it changed its name several times until it called itself Islamic State of Iraq (ISI) in 2006. The group is often seen as the predecessor of the Islamic State.

== Origins ==
Abu Musab al-Zarqawi was a Jordanian jihadist who traveled to Afghanistan to fight within the Soviet–Afghan War, but arrived after the departure of the Soviet troops, and soon returned to his homeland. He eventually returned to Afghanistan, where he ran an Islamic militant training camp near Herat.

A report released by the Washington Institute for Near East Policy in mid-2014 describes al-Zarqawi, in association with other Jordanians and Sunni jihadist militants, as starting JTJ in 1999 with its training camp in Herat, and with "a small amount of seed money" from bin Laden "which continued until 9/11".

== Ideology and motivation ==
Al-Zarqawi's interpretation of Islamic takfir—accusing other Muslims of heresy and thereby justifying their killing—was extreme, which caused friction between him and bin Laden.

Al-Zarqawi's political motives included what he considered the British Mandate for Palestine as a "gift to the Jews so they can rape the land and humiliate our people", the United Nations' support for American "oppressors of Iraq", and the "humiliation [of] our [Muslim] nation".

== History ==
=== In Jordan (1999–2001) ===
Al-Zarqawi started JTJ with the intention of overthrowing the 'apostate' Kingdom of Jordan, which he considered to be un-Islamic. After toppling Jordan's monarchy, presumably he would turn to the rest of the Levant.

For these purposes he developed numerous contacts and affiliates in several countries. His network may have been involved in the late 1999 plot to bomb the Millennium celebrations in the United States and Jordan.

=== In Jordan and Iraq (2001–2002) ===
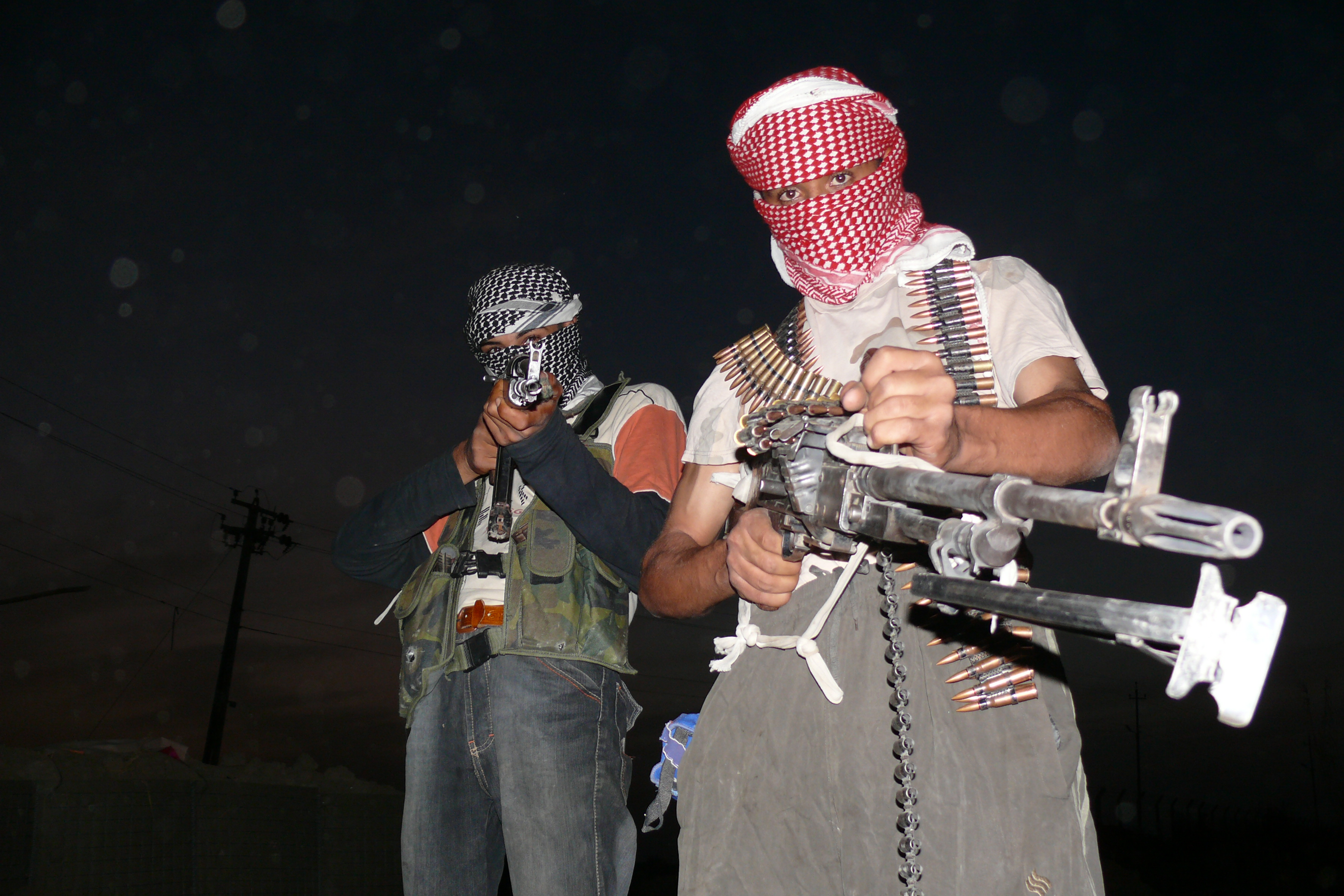
A pair of armed anti-American insurgents in Iraq in 2006

Following the 2001 US-led invasion of Afghanistan, al-Zarqawi moved to Iraq, where he reportedly received medical treatment in Baghdad for an injured leg.

Al-Zarqawi was in Baghdad from May until late November 2002, when he traveled to Iran and northeastern Iraq. The United States 2006 Senate Report on Pre-war Intelligence on Iraq concluded: "Postwar information indicates that Saddam Hussein attempted, unsuccessfully, to locate and capture al-Zarqawi and that the regime did not have a relationship with, harbor, or turn a blind eye toward al-Zarqawi."

Al-Zarqawi and his operatives were held responsible by the United States for the assassination of US diplomat Laurence Foley in Jordan in October 2002.

=== Involvement in the Iraq War (2003–2004) ===
Following the US invasion of Iraq and the ensuing insurgency, Jama'at became a decentralized militant network fighting against the coalition forces and their Iraqi allies. Jama'at included a growing number of foreign fighters and a considerable Iraqi membership, including remnants of Ansar al-Islam.

Many foreign fighters arriving in Iraq were not initially associated with Jama'at, but once they were in the country they became dependent on al-Zarqawi's local contacts.

Jama'at's tactics included suicide bombings, often using car bombs, kidnappings, the planting of improvised explosive devices, attacks using rocket-propelled grenades, small arms and mortars, and beheading Iraqi and foreign hostages and distributing video recordings of these acts on the Internet.

The group targeted Iraqi security forces and those assisting the occupation, Iraqi interim officials, Iraqi Shia and Kurdish political and religious figures and institutions, Shia civilians, foreign civilian contractors, United Nations and humanitarian workers, and also Sunni Muslim civilians.

=== Pledge of allegiance to Osama bin Laden ===
On 17 October 2004, al-Zarqawi pledged allegiance to Osama bin Laden, and the group became known as Tanzim Qaidat al-Jihad fi Bilad al-Rafidayn (commonly known as Al-Qaeda in Iraq). Al-Zarqawi died in a US targeted airstrike in June 2006 on an isolated safe house north of Baghdad at 6:15 p.m. local time.

== Activities ==
=== Attacks ===
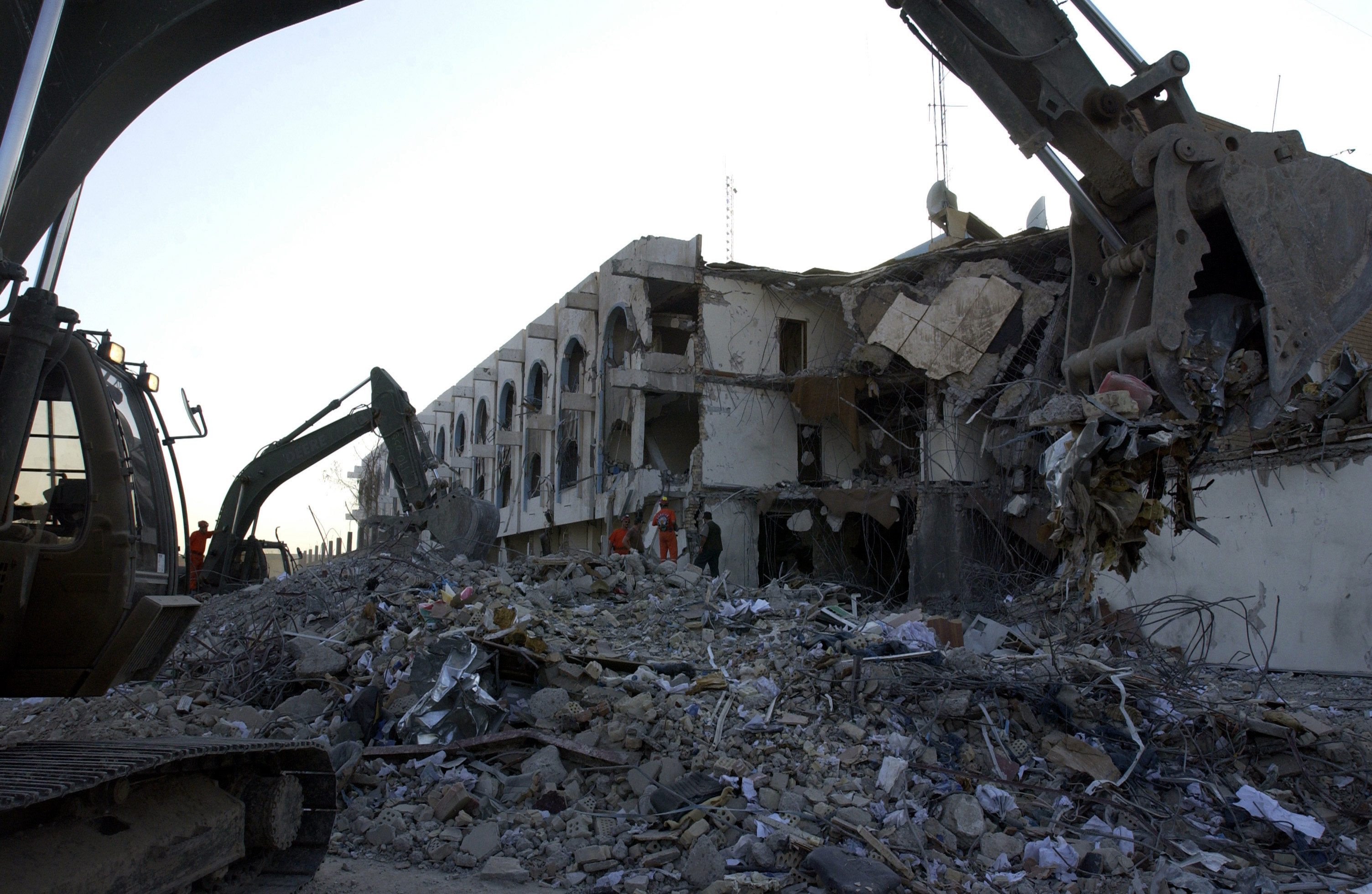
The UN headquarters building in Baghdad after the Canal Hotel bombing, on 19 August 2003

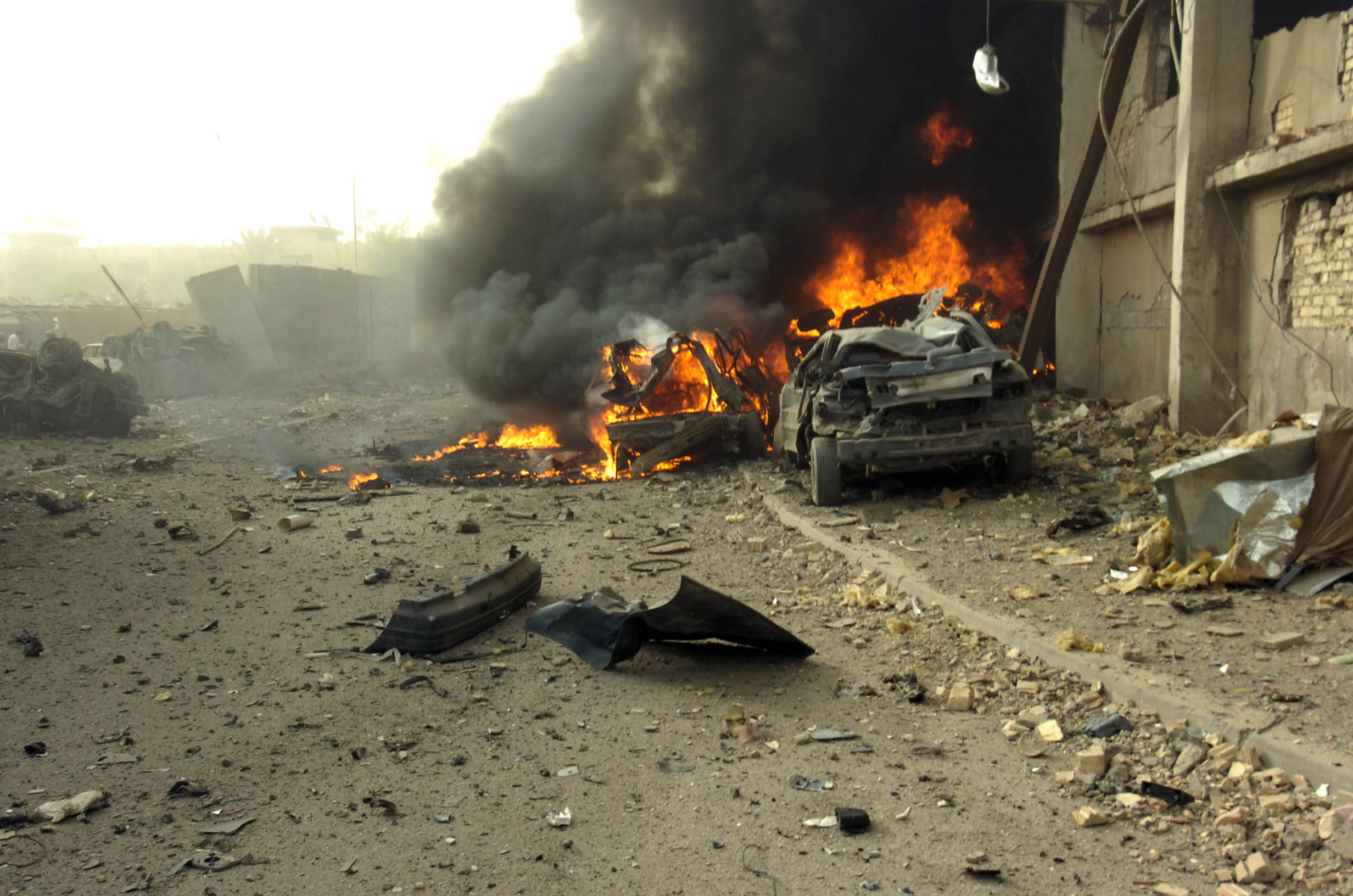
Car bombings were a common form of attack in Iraq during the Coalition occupation

=== 2003 ===
After the U.S.-led invasion of Iraq and the establishment of a governing Provisional Authority, an insurgency quickly emerged. Dozens of insurgent attacks were claimed by, or attributed to, JTJ in the following months.

On 7 August 2003, the Jordanian embassy in Baghdad was bombed, killing 17 and injuring at least 40. The Jamestown Foundation considered Abu Musab al-Zarqawi and JTJ responsible.

On 19 August: the Canal Hotel in Baghdad, the UN headquarters in the city, was bombed, killing 23 people, including the Chief of the United Nations Mission to Iraq, Sérgio Vieira de Mello. More than 100 were injured. Al-Zarqawi claimed responsibility for this attack in April 2004, saying the U.N. "gave Palestine to the Jews so they can humiliate our people" and are "friends of the [American] oppressors".

On 12 November, a truck bombing in Nasiriyah killed 17 Italian paramilitary policemen partaking in the U.S.-led 'Multi-National Force', as well as 10 civilians. It injured at least 100. The Jamestown Foundation considered JTJ responsible.

=== 2004 ===
On 2 March 2004, during the holy Day of Ashura, a series of bombings in Baghdad and Karbala killed some Shia civilians, wounding at least 500. The Washington Institute for Near East Policy held JTJ responsible.

On 19 April, there was a failed attempt to explode chemical bombs in Amman, Jordan, which was reportedly financed by JTJ.

On 24 April, in a statement published on the Islamist web site Muntada al-Ansar, al-Zarqawi took responsibility for a series of suicide boat bombings of oil pumping stations in the Persian Gulf.

On 18 May, the Iraqi Governing Council President, Ezzedine Salim, was assassinated in Baghdad by a car bomb. JTJ stated on an Islamist website that they were "determined to lift the humiliation from our nation (...) Another lion has removed the rotten head of those who betray God and sell their religion to the Americans and their allies".

On 18 June, a car bombing suicide attack in Baghdad near an Iraqi Army recruitment center killed 35 civilians, and wounded 145. JTJ was blamed.

On 1 August, six churches in Baghdad and Mosul were attacked, killing 12 people and wounding 71. Iraq's national security adviser, Mowaffaq al-Rubaie, blamed the attacks on Zarqawi.

On 14 September, a car bomb killed 47 and injured nearly 100 police recruits on Haifa Street in Baghdad.

On 30 September 2004, a bombing in Baghdad killed 41 people, mostly children. JTJ claimed responsibility for unspecified attacks on that day, but it was unclear if this included the bombing.

JTJ claimed responsibility for an October 2004 massacre of 49 unarmed Iraqi National Guard recruits.

On 3 December 2004, there was a failed attempt to blow up an Iraqi–Jordanian border crossing, for which al-Zarqawi and two of his associates were sentenced to death in absentia by a Jordanian court in 2006.

=== Inciting sectarian violence ===
Alleged sectarian attacks by the organization included the Imam Ali Mosque bombing in 2003 and the 2004 Day of Ashura bombings (Ashoura massacre) and Karbala and Najaf bombings in 2004. These were precursors to a more widespread campaign of sectarian violence after the organization transitioned to become Al-Qaeda in Iraq, with al-Zarqawi purportedly declaring an all-out war on Shias, while claiming responsibility for the Shia mosque bombings.

=== Beheading/killing non-Iraqi hostages ===
- 7 May 2004: Nick Berg, American civilian beheaded. A video of the killing was published on the Internet; the CIA said it was likely that al-Zarqawi personally had wielded the knife
- 22 June 2004: Kim Sun-il, South Korean civilian, executed by beheading.
- 8 July 2004: Georgi Lazov and Ivaylo Kepov, Bulgarian civilians beheaded
- 2 August 2004: Murat Yuce, Turkish civilian shot dead, by Abu Ayyub al-Masri.
- 13 September 2004: Durmus Kumdereli, Turkish civilian beheaded
- 20 September 2004: Eugene Armstrong, American civilian beheaded. Presumably claimed by al-Zarqawi and his men. Some sources claimed it was done by al-Zarqawi personally. It was shown in Fitna, a LiveLeak film in 2008.
- 21 September 2004: Jack Hensley, American civilian beheaded. Presumably by al-Zarqawi and his men.
- 7 October 2004: Kenneth Bigley, British civilian beheaded. Presumably by al-Zarqawi and his men.
- 29 October 2004: Shosei Koda, Japanese civilian beheaded. An Islamist website that was used by al-Zarqawi's group had posted video of Koda shortly after the abduction.

The Turkish translator Aytullah Gezmen was also abducted by Jama'at, but released after "repenting."

== U.S. fighting Jama'at ==
In September 2004, the U.S. conducted many airstrikes targeting al-Zarqawi, calling the hunt for al-Zarqawi its "highest priority".

== Legacy ==
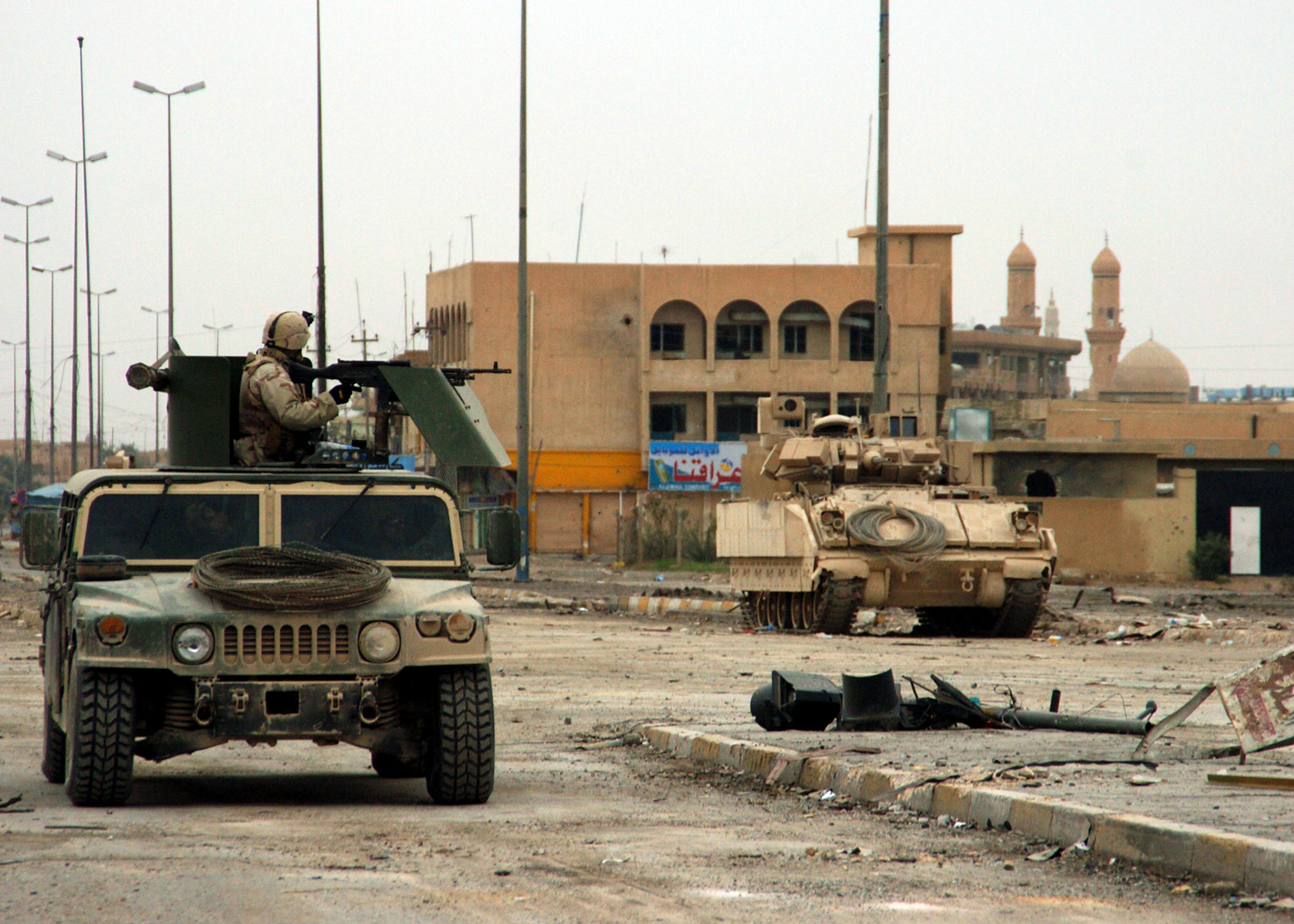
U.S. soldiers in Fallujah in November 2004 pursuing al-Zarqawi's network

Al-Zarqawi pledged allegiance to Osama bin Laden in a letter in October 2004 and changed its name to Tanzim Qaidat al-Jihad fi Bilad al-Rafidayn.

That same month, the group, now popularly referred to as Al-Qaeda in Iraq (AQI), kidnapped and killed Japanese citizen Shosei Koda. In November, al-Zarqawi's network was the main target of the US Operation Phantom Fury in Fallujah, but its leadership managed to escape the American siege and subsequent storming of the city.

The Lebanese-Palestinian militant group Fatah al-Islam, which was defeated by Lebanese government forces during the 2007 Lebanon conflict, was linked to AQI and led by al-Zarqawi's former companion Mustafa Ramadan Darwish who had fought alongside him in Iraq.

The group may have been linked to the little-known group called "Tawhid and Jihad in Syria", and may have influenced the Palestinian resistance group in Gaza called Tawhid and Jihad Brigades.

== See also ==
- Abu Ayyub al-Masri
- Islamic State of Iraq and the Levant
- Saddam Hussein and al-Qaeda link allegations
- Territory of Jama'at al-Tawhid wa-l-Jihad
- Terrorism in Iraq
