= Sultan al Haseri =

- Died: July 9, 2005; Saudi Arabia
- Occupation: Al Qaeda member
- Known for: named on a Saudi most wanted list

Sultan al Haseri (died July 9, 2005) was a citizen of Saudi Arabia who was killed during a shootout with Saudi security officials in 2005. Al Haseri and nine other men were surrounded by security officials for three days. Al Haseri and four other men named on Saudi Arabia's list of most wanted terrorist suspects were killed during the standoff. The five men, Al Haseri, Zaid al-Samari, Saleh al-Fraidi, Nayef al-Jeheishi and Mohammad al-Suwailmi had just been placed two weeks earlier on a list of 36 men wanted by Saudi security officials.

Security officials elected not to storm the hideout because it was in a residential neighborhood and was believed to be packed with explosives.

The Khaleej Times reported that Saudi security officials asserted Al Haseri had “taken part in the abduction and killing of a (foreign) resident.” The Khaleej Times speculated the foreign resident was Paul Johnson, an American engineer, who was kidnapped and beheaded in June 2004.
