= Kidnapping and murder of Kenneth Bigley =

British civil engineer and murder victim

Kenneth Bigley
- Born: Kenneth John Bigley; 22 April 1942; Liverpool, England, UK
- Died: 7 October 2004 (aged 62); Iraq
- Cause of death: Decapitation

Kenneth John Bigley (22 April 1942 – 7 October 2004) was a British civil engineer who was kidnapped by Islamic extremists in the al-Mansour district of Baghdad, Iraq, on 16 September 2004, along with his colleagues, US citizens Jack Hensley and Eugene Armstrong. Following the murders of Hensley and Armstrong by beheading over the course of three days, Bigley was killed in the same manner two weeks later, despite the attempted intervention of the Muslim Council of Britain and the indirect intervention of the British government. Videos of the killings were posted on websites and blogs.

== Capture ==
The three men were working for Gulf Supplies and Commercial Services, a Kuwaiti company working on reconstruction projects in Iraq. The men knew their home was being watched and realised they were in great danger when their Iraqi house guard informed them he was leaving due to threats by militias for protecting American and British workers. Bigley and the two Americans decided it was worth the risk and continued to live in the house until their abduction on 16 September.

On 18 September, the Tawhid and Jihad ("Oneness of God and Jihad") Islamic extremist group, led by Jordanian Abu Musab al-Zarqawi, released a video of the three men kneeling in front of a Tawhid and Jihad banner. The kidnappers said they would kill the men within 48 hours if their demands for the release of Iraqi women prisoners held by coalition forces were not met. Armstrong was killed on 20 September, when the deadline expired, and Hensley 24 hours later.

== Negotiations for release ==
After Armstrong and Hensley were killed, the British government and media responded by turning Bigley's fate into Britain's major political issue during this period, leading to subsequent claims that the government had become a hostage to the situation. The British Foreign Secretary Jack Straw and the Prime Minister Tony Blair personally contacted the Bigley family several times to assure them that everything possible was being done, short of direct negotiation with the kidnappers. It was also reported that a Special Air Service (SAS) team had been placed on standby in Iraq in the event that a rescue mission might become possible.

The British government issued a statement saying it held no Iraqi women prisoners, and that the only two women known to be in US custody were two so-called high-profile Iraqi scientists, British-educated Rihab Taha and US-educated Huda Salih Mahdi Ammash. Both women participated in Iraq's biological-weapons programme, according to the United Nations weapons inspectorate. News reports had earlier suggested that other Iraqi women were indeed being held in US custody, but it is not known to what extent these reports were out-of-date by the time of Bigley's kidnap. The Iraqi provisional government stated that Taha and Ammash could be released immediately, stressing that this was about to happen anyway, as no charges had been brought against the women.

=== Second and third videos ===
A second beheading video was released on 22 September by Bigley's captors, this time showing Bigley pleading for his life and begging the British Prime Minister Tony Blair to save him. Clearly exhausted and highly emotional, Bigley spoke directly to Blair: "I need you to help me now, Blair, because you are the only person on God's earth who can help me." The video was posted on several websites, blogs and shown on Al Jazeera television.

Around this time it emerged that Bigley's mother Lil (then 86 years old) had been born in Dublin and was therefore entitled to be a citizen of the Republic of Ireland; this meant Bigley himself was also an Irish citizen from birth. It was hoped this status would aid his release, as Ireland did not participate in the 2003 invasion of Iraq, and the Irish Government issued Bigley an Irish passport in absentia, which was shown on Al Jazeera television. The Irish Labour Party spokesman on foreign affairs, Michael D. Higgins, made an appeal on Al-Jazeera. Sinn Féin leader Gerry Adams made two appeals, one on 30 September and a second on 7 October.

On 24 September, 50,000 leaflets prepared by the British Foreign Office, asking for information about Bigley's whereabouts, were distributed in al-Mansour, the wealthy district of Baghdad Bigley had been living in. In his home town of Liverpool, Christian and Muslim religious and civic leaders held joint prayer sessions for his safe return. The Muslim Council of Britain condemned the kidnapping, saying it was contrary to the teachings of the Qur'an and sent a senior two-man delegation to Iraq on 26 September to negotiate on Bigley's behalf.

Bigley's family, particularly his brother Paul, was successful, with the help of the Irish government, in eliciting support for Bigley's release from Palestinian leader Yasser Arafat, King Abdullah of Jordan, and Colonel Gaddafi of Libya, who made public statements. A third video was released on 29 September, showing Bigley chained inside a small chicken-wire cage, wearing an orange boiler suit apparently intended to be reminiscent of those worn by inmates at the US detention facility at Guantanamo Bay, Cuba. In the video, Bigley again begged for his life, saying, "Tony Blair is lying. He doesn't care about me. I'm just one person." On 1 October, another 100,000 leaflets asking for information about Bigley were distributed by the British consulate in Baghdad.

== Death ==
Despite the efforts to save him, Bigley was beheaded on 7 October 2004. His death was first reported on Abu Dhabi television the following day. A multi-faith memorial service, attended by Tony Blair and his wife Cherie, was held for Bigley in Liverpool on 13 November 2004. His body has not been recovered, although an alleged al-Qaeda terrorist awaiting trial for the 2003 Istanbul bombings has claimed he is "buried in a ditch at the entrance to Fallujah".

The kidnappers made a film apparently showing Bigley's murder, and the tape was subsequently posted on Islamist websites and on one shock site. According to reporters who watched the film, Bigley was wearing an orange jumpsuit, and read out a statement, before one of the kidnappers stepped forward and cut off his head with a knife. The bloodied head was then placed on top of Bigley's abdomen. News reports published after Bigley's death suggested he had briefly managed to escape from the kidnappers with the help of two MI6 agents of Syrian and Iraqi origin, who paid two of his captors to help him. The captors attempted to drive Bigley, who was carrying a gun and was disguised, out of town, the reports said, but he was spotted and recaptured at an insurgent checkpoint. The two captors who were said to have helped him escape were purportedly executed shortly thereafter.

== Torture-chamber discovery ==
The chicken-wire cage in which Bigley was filmed was found in November 2004 by US troops in a house in Fallujah during the Second Battle of Fallujah. The US military stated that, in 20 houses, it found paraphernalia associated with hostage-holding and torture, including shackles, blood-stained walls, and a torture chamber.

== The Spectator controversy ==
Boris Johnson, the then editor of The Spectator, was criticised by Simon Heffer for an editorial published on 16 October 2004 following the death of Bigley in Iraq, in which it was claimed that the response to Bigley's killing was fuelled by the fact he was from Liverpool, and went on to criticise the "drunken" fans at Hillsborough and called on them to accept responsibility for their "role" in the Hillsborough stadium disaster in 1989:

The extreme reaction to Mr Bigley's murder is fed by the fact that he was a Liverpudlian. Liverpool is a handsome city with a tribal sense of community. A combination of economic misfortune — its docks were, fundamentally, on the wrong side of England when Britain entered what is now the European Union — and an excessive predilection for welfarism have created a peculiar, and deeply unattractive, psyche among many Liverpudlians. They see themselves whenever possible as victims, and resent their victim status; yet at the same time they wallow in it. Part of this flawed psychological state is that they cannot accept that they might have made any contribution to their misfortunes, but seek rather to blame someone else for it, thereby deepening their sense of shared tribal grievance against the rest of society. The deaths of more than 50 Liverpool football supporters at Hillsborough in 1989 was undeniably a greater tragedy than the single death, however horrible, of Mr Bigley; but that is no excuse for Liverpool's failure to acknowledge, even to this day, the part played in the disaster by drunken fans at the back of the crowd who mindlessly tried to fight their way into the ground that Saturday afternoon. The police became a convenient scapegoat, and the Sun newspaper a whipping-boy for daring, albeit in a tasteless fashion, to hint at the wider causes of the incident.

Johnson apologised at the time of the article, travelling to Liverpool to do so, and again following the publication of the report of the Hillsborough Independent Panel in 2012; however, Johnson's apology was rejected by Margaret Aspinall, chairperson of the Hillsborough Families Support Group, whose son James, 18, died in the disaster:

What he has got to understand is that we were speaking the truth for 23 years and apologies have only started to come today from them because of yesterday. It's too little, too late. It's fine to apologise afterwards. They just don't want their names in any more sleaze. No, his apology doesn't mean a thing to me.

== See also ==
- Beheading video
- Daniel Pearl
- Fabrizio Quattrocchi
- Human rights situation in post-Saddam Iraq
- Kim Sun-il
- List of kidnappings
- Lists of solved missing person cases
- Nick Berg
- Paul Marshall Johnson, Jr.
- Piotr Stańczak
- Seif Adnan Kanaan
- Shosei Koda
- Steven Vincent
