= Podyachevo =

Podyachevo Подъячево
- Village
- Location within Perm Krai Location within Russia
- Coordinates: 59°53′N 54°30′E
- Country: Russia
- Region: Perm Krai
- District: Kosinsky District
- Time zone: UTC+5:00

Podyachevo (Russian: Подъячево; Komi-Permyak: Поддячӧв, Podďaćöv) is a rural locality (a village) in Chazyovskoye Rural Settlement, Kosinsky District, Perm Krai, Russia. The population was 143 as of 2010. There are 2 streets.

== Geography ==
Podyachevo is located 29 km west of Kosa (the district's administrative centre) by road. Chazevo is the nearest rural locality.
