= Terrorism and social media =

Terrorism and mass media

Terrorists often use social media to advertise their attacks and or messages. According to some researchers the convenience, affordability, and broad reach of social media platforms such as YouTube, Facebook and Twitter, terrorist groups and individuals have increasingly used social media to further their goals, recruit members, and spread their message. Attempts have been made by various governments and agencies to thwart the use of social media by terrorist organizations.

Terror groups take to social media because it's cheap, accessible, and facilitates quick access to a lot of people. Social media allow them to engage with their networks. In the past, it wasn't so easy for these groups to engage with the people they wanted to whereas social media allows terrorists to release their messages right to their intended audience and interact with them in real time. "Spend some time following the account, and you realize that you're dealing with a real human being with real ideas- albeit boastful, hypocritical, violent ideas". Al- Qaeda has been noted as being as being one of the terror groups that uses social media the most extensively. "While almost all terrorist groups have websites, al qaeda [sic] is the first to fully exploit the internet. This reflects al-Qaeda's unique characteristics."

Despite the risks of making statements, such as enabling governments to locate terror group leaders, terror leaders communicate regularly with video and audio messages which are posted on the website and disseminated on the internet. ISIS uses social media to their advantage when releasing threatening videos of beheadings. ISIS uses this tactic to scare normal people on social media. Similarly, Western domestic terrorists also use social media and technology to spread their ideas.

== Traditional media ==
Many authors have proposed that media attention increases perceptions of risk of fear of terrorism and crime and relates to how much attention the person pays to the news. The relationship between terrorism and the media has long been noted. Terrorist organizations depend on the open media systems of democratic countries to further their goals and spread their messages. To garner publicity for their cause, terrorist organizations resort to acts of violence and aggression that deliberately target civilians. This method has proven to be effective in gathering attention:

It cannot be denied that although terrorism has proved remarkably ineffective as the major weapon for taking down governments and capturing political power, it has been a remarkably successful means of publicizing a political cause and relaying the terrorist threat to a wider audience, particularly in the open and pluralistic countries of the West. When one says 'terrorism' in a democratic society, one also says 'media'.

While a media organization may not support the goals of terrorist organizations, it is their job to report current events and issues. In the fiercely competitive media environment, when a terrorist attack occurs, media outlets scramble to cover the event. In doing so, the media help to further the message of terrorist organizations:

To summarise briefly on the symbiotic nature of the relationship between terrorists and the media, the recent history of terrorism in many democratic countries vividly demonstrates that terrorists do thrive on the oxygen of publicity, and it is foolish to deny this. This does not mean that the established democratic media share the values of the terrorists. It does demonstrate, however, that the free media in an open society are particularly vulnerable to exploitation and manipulation by ruthless terrorist organisations.

The leader of al-Qaeda, Osama bin Laden, discussed the weaponization of media in a letter written after his organization committed the terrorist attacks on September 11, 2001. In that letter, bin Laden stated that fear was the deadliest weapon. He noted that the Western civilization has become obsessed with mass media, quickly consuming what will bring them fear. He further stated that societies are bringing this problem on their own people by giving media coverage an inherent power.

In relation to one's need for media coverage, al-Qaeda and other militant Jihadi terrorist organizations can be classified as a far-right radical offshoot of mainstream mass media. The Jihad needs to conceptualize their martyrdom by leaving behind manifestos and live videos of their attacks; it is crucially important to them that their ill deeds are being covered by news media.

The components the media looks for to deem the news "worthy" enough to publicize are categorized into ten qualities; terrorists usually exceed half in their attacks. These include: Immediacy, Conflict, Negativity, Human Interest, Photographability, Simple Story Lines, Topicality, Exclusivity, Reliability, and Local Interest. Historically, morality and profitability are two motivations which are not easily weighed when delivering news; recent news coverage has become far more motivated in making money for their parent corporation than serving as a defender of truth, doing true journalistic fact-finding, and shielding the public from news which is sensational, outright untrue, or politically-motivated propaganda.

A study concerning the disparity in coverage of terrorist events took attacks from the ten‑year span of 2005–2015 and found that 136 episodes of terrorism occurred in the United States. LexisNexis Academic and CNN were the platforms used to measure the media coverage. It was found that out of other terrorist attacks showed on the news, one's with Muslim perpetrators received more than 357% coverage. In addition to this disparity, attacks also received more coverage when they were targeted at the government, had high fatality rates, and showed arrests being made. These findings were aligned with America's tendency to categorize Muslim people as a threat to national security. Thus, mass media coverage on terrorism is creating fake narratives and an absence of related coverage. For instance, the American public believes that crime rates have been on the rise which in fact they have been on an all-time low. Given that the media often covers crime almost immediately and frequently, suggests that people infer it happening all the time. In reference to the disparity in terror attacks, three attacks were seen to have the least media coverage of all the 136. The Sikh Temple massacre in Wisconsin which had 2.6% coverage, the Kansas synagogue killings which had 2.2%, and the Charleston Church deaths which only resulted in 5.1% coverage. The three events had commonalities worth mentioning in that they all had white perpetrators and were not directed at government intuitions (in fact all targeted minorities). The media's obsession with terror is making people fearful of the wrong things and not attentive enough to the issues that are radically unseen.

Not only are minorities usually not the perpetrators of domestic terrorism, but they are common victims in mass casualties or proximal witnesses to the attacks. In an early 2000s study, 72 Israeli adults were measured pre and posttest for increased anxiety after being exposed to news broadcasts of terrorism attacks. The study found that the group exposed to the broadcasts without any treatment (preparation intervention) had heightened levels of anxiety compared to the group that received the treatment along with viewing the broadcast. Since preparatory intervention is not yet normalized, people in proximity to ongoing coverage of terror events are suffering from the lasting impacts of fear and anxiety. Preparatory Intervention, in this case, was conducted by a group facilitator who introduced a topic concerning terrorism in which participants were instructed to write down feelings to share with the group and later learn to cope with.

A discourse of fear created by mass media presence, but false information is leading people to prepare for the wrong situations. In the early 2000s, police units circulated public schools flooding the idea of Stranger Danger into the minds of adolescents. Children and their parents cautiously separated from strangers while perpetrators in those families' social circles continued to offend under the radar. For myths are becoming common, precedent and real danger is buried beneath the surface. It is these implementations of fear that are falsifying the true narrative which for terrorism is a huge social problem but one that is not resolved through entertainment and mass media production. Mass media like news outlets and even social media platforms are contributing to the growing discourse of fear surrounding terrorism.

One notable example of the relationship between terror groups and the media was the release of the Osama bin Laden audio and video recordings. These tapes were sent directly to mainstream Arabic television networks, including Al-Jazeera.

Media can often be the source of discontent for terrorist groups. Irene Kahn says,

New seeds of social discord and insecurity are sprouting between citizens and noncitizens. Racism and xenophobia are latent in all societies, but in some European countries they feature blatantly as some politicians exploit people's fears and prejudices for short-term electoral gains. Some aspects of the media have played into this strategy, dehumanizing and demonizing foreigners, foreign-born citizens, refugees, and asylum seekers. They are pointed out as a source of danger and become an easy target for hate speech and violence. Those who need their rights protected the most have become the ones most at risk of attacks.

Most terrorist groups use social media as a means to bypass the traditional media and spread their propaganda.

== Media surveillance ==
The network described in Michel Foucault's theory of surveillance, panopticism, is a networks of power where all parties are transfixed by the actions of the others in the network. It is especially imperative when major events in the world occur, which is usually the case with terrorism. This model can be transposed on the network of power that media-outlet consumers and producers enter. In a network of power that includes consumers and producers, both parties have fixed gazes' on each other. The consumers transfix their gazes' on the stories that media outlets produce. And, the needs of the consumers, which is in this case their need to be updated regularly, becomes the producers gaze. The producers or media outlets are in competition with other media outlets to supply their constituents with the most up-to-date information. This network of fixed gazes' is both "privileged and imperative" for the system to satisfy the status quo.

Consumers looks to media outlets to provide news on terrorism. If consumers believe terrorism is a threat to their safety, they want to be informed of the threats against them. Media outlets fulfill their viewers' needs, and portray terrorism as a threat because of the cycle that surveillance engenders. As terrorism flourishes as a prominent discourse of fear, consumers want information faster because they feel their safe being is in peril. The idea of total surveillance, as prescribed by Foucault, becomes a cycle where the disruption of power causes scrutiny by various players in system. If the media-outlets are not constantly looking for stories that fulfill consumer needs, then they are scrutinized. In addition to the surveillance aspect of news dissemination, therein is the notion that "needs" drive the network of power: both the media outlets and consumers have needs that are fulfilled by broadcasting the news. It is this idea expressed in the uses and gratifications theory. It stipulates that the active audience and the terrorist "seek to satisfy their various needs" through media transmission. While media outlets know the stories they show have astounding effects on the political and sociological perspective in society, the impetus on economic gains is of greater importance.

== Use of social media ==
In a study by Gabriel Weimann from the University of Haifa, Weimann found that nearly 90% of organized terrorism activities on the internet takes place via social media. According to Weimann, terror groups use social media platforms like Twitter, Facebook, YouTube, and internet forums to spread their messages, recruit members and gather intelligence.

Terror groups take to social media because social media tools are cheap and accessible, facilitate quick, broad dissemination of messages, and allow for unfettered communication with an audience without the filter or "selectivity" of mainstream news outlets. Also, social media platforms allow terror groups to engage with their networks. Whereas previously terror groups would release messages via intermediaries, social media platforms allow terror groups to release messages directly to their intended audience and converse with their audience in real time: Weimann also mentions in "Theater of Terror", that terrorists use the media to promote the theatrical like nature of the premeditated terror.

HSMPress is using Twitter the way social media experts have always advised- not just broadcasting, but engaging in conversation. Spend some time following the account, and you realize that you're dealing with a real human being with real ideas—albeit boastful, hypocritical, violent ideas.

=== Terror groups using social media ===
Al-Qaeda has been noted as being one of the terror groups that uses social media the most extensively. Brian Jenkins, senior advisor for the RAND Corporation, commented on Al-Qaeda's dominant presence on the web:

While almost all terrorist organizations have websites, al-Qaeda is the first to fully exploit the internet. This reflects al-Qaeda's unique characteristics. It regards itself as a global movement and therefore depends on a global communications network to reach its perceived constituents. It sees its mission as not simply creating terror among its foes but awakening the Muslim community. Its leaders view communications as 90 percent of the struggle. Despite the risks imposed by intense manhunts, its leaders communicate regularly with video and audio messages, which are posted on its websites and disseminated on the Internet. The number of websites devoted to the al Qaeda-inspired movement has grown from a handful to reportedly thousands, although many of these are ephemeral.

According to Rob Wainwright, author of "Fighting Crime and Terrorism in the Age of Technology," in order for ISIS to spread its message, they have utilized more than one hundred sites. This shows how vastly social media is used by terrorist groups. Known terrorist group the Islamic State of Iraq and the Levant, also translated to ISIS, uses the widespread of news over social media to their advantage when releasing threatening videos of beheadings. As of November 16, 2014, following the beheading of former U.S. Army Ranger Peter Kassig, there have now been five recorded executions of Westerners taken captive in Syria. James Foley, David Cawthorne Haines, Alan Henning, and Steven Sotloff are also among the men kidnapped and executed by ISIS. The videos of the brutal beheadings are both posted online by ISIS, where they can be viewed by anyone using their own discretion, and sent to government officials as threats. Posting the executions online gives the terrorist groups the power to manipulate viewers and cause havoc among the population viewing them, and the videos have the ability to instill fear within the Western world. The videos are typically high production quality and generally show the entirety of the gruesome act, with the hostage speaking a few words before they are killed on camera.

In the case of U.S. aid worker Peter Kassig, his video did not show the actual beheading act and he did not speak any final words before the execution. His silence and the fact that the actual execution was not included in the video raised question about his video was different than the rest. In response to Kassig's beheading, his family expressed their wish that news media avoid doing what the group wants by refraining from publishing or distributing the video. By refusing to circulate the video of the beheading, it therefore loses the ability to manipulate Americans or further the cause of the terrorist group.

In addition to beheading videos, ISIS has released videos of their members doing nonviolent acts. For example, Imran Awan described one such instance in his article "Cyber-Extremism: Isis and the Power of Social Media" where one video showed members of the Islamic State were seen helping people and visiting hospitals. These videos gave a humanistic nature to the terrorist group members, therefore, contradicting what civilians think terrorist groups should be.

Edgar Jones has mentioned in his article, "The Reception of Broadcast Terrorism: Recruitment and Radicalisation," that ISIS has utilized documentaries and even their own magazine, Dabiq, in order to recruit new members and to get their message out to the public. This illustrates just a couple of the various mediums that ISIS has used.

According to Wainwright, social media is also used by ISIS and other terror groups to recruit foreign people to join the terrorist cause. In some cases, these new recruits are sent back to their home country to carry out terrorist attacks. Others who can not physically move to the terrorist cause have been known to carry out acts of terrorism in their own countries due to the propaganda that they are exposed to online. This exhibits how ISIS can brainwash or expand on ideas that individuals may have.

The Taliban has been active on Twitter since May 2011, and has more than 7,000 followers. Tweeting under the handle @alemarahweb, the Taliban tweets frequently, on some days nearly hourly. This account is currently suspended.

In December 2011, it was discovered that the Somalia-based terror cell Al-Shabaab was using a Twitter account under the name @HSMPress. Since opening on December 7, 2011, the account has amassed tens of thousands of followers and tweets frequently.

Shortly after a series of coordinated Christmas bombings in Kono, Nigeria, in 2011, the Nigerian-based terror group Boko Haram released a video statement defending their actions to YouTube. Boko Haram has also used Twitter to voice their opinions.

=== AQAP and Islamic State (ISIS/ISIL/DAESH) ===
Islamic State has emerged as one of the most potent users of social media. In many respects, Islamic State learned their propaganda craft from al-Qaeda on the Arabian Peninsula (AQAP). However, IS quickly eclipsed its mentor, deploying a whole range of narratives, images and political proselytizing through various social media platforms. A study by Berger and Morgan estimated that at least 46,000 Twitter accounts were used by ISIS supporters between September and December 2014. However, as ISIS supporters regularly get suspended and then easily create new, duplicate accounts, counting ISIS Twitter accounts over a few months can overestimate the number of unique people represented by 20–30%. In 2019, Storyful discovered that approximately two dozen TikTok accounts were used to post propaganda videos targeting users. Accounts broadcast news from Amaq News Agency, the official news outlet for the Islamic State.

However, as the November 2015 attacks in Paris demonstrate, IS also uses old-fashioned methods of communication and propaganda. Lewis notes that the attacks in Paris represent the sort of 'propaganda in action' which was a method developed by the 19th century anarchists in Europe. The November 2015 IS attacks were perpetrated without prior warning, largely because the operatives met face-to-face and used other non-digital means of communication.

== Attempts to thwart the use of social media by terror groups ==
Some U.S. government officials have urged social media companies to stop hosting content from terror groups. In particular, Joe Lieberman has been especially vocal in demanding that social media companies not permit terror groups to use their tools. In 2008, Lieberman and the United States Senate Committee on Homeland Security and Governmental Affairs issued a report titled "Violent Islamist Extremism, the Internet, and the Homegrown Terrorist Threat". The report stated that the internet is one of the "primary drivers" of the terrorist threat to the United States.

In response to the news that Al-Shabaab was using Twitter, U.S. officials have called for the company to shut down the account. Twitter executives have not complied with these demands and have declined to comment on the case.

In January 2012, Twitter announced changes to their censorship policy, stating that they would now be censoring tweets in certain countries when the tweets risked breaking the local laws of that country. The reason behind the move was stated on their website as follows:

As we continue to grow internationally, we will enter countries that have different ideas about the contours of freedom of expression. Some differ so much from our ideas that we will not be able to exist there. Others are similar but, for historical or cultural reasons, restrict certain types of content, such as France or Germany, which ban pro-Nazi content. Until now, the only way we could take account of those countries' limits was to remove content globally. Starting today, we give ourselves the ability to reactively withhold content from users in a specific country — while keeping it available in the rest of the world. We have also built in a way to communicate transparently to users when content is withheld, and why.

The move drew criticism from many Twitter users who said the move was an affront to free speech. Many of the users threatened to quit tweeting if the policy was not rescinded, including Chinese artist and activist Ai Weiwei.

In December 2010, in response to growing demands that YouTube pull video content from terrorist groups from its servers, the company added a "promotes terrorism" option under the "violent or repulsive content" category that viewers can select to "flag" offensive content. By limiting the terrorists access to conventional mass media and censoring news coverage of terrorist acts and their perpetrators and also minimising the terrorists allowance to manipulate mass media, the mass fear impact that is usually created will decrease.

=== Effectiveness of suspension ===
Western governments have been actively trying to surveil and censor IS social media sites. As Jeff Lewis explains, as quickly as platform managers close down accounts, IS and its supporters continually create new IDs which they then use to resurge back with new accounts and sites for propaganda. A case study of an al Shabaab account and a George Washington University white paper found that accounts that resurged did not regain the high number of followers they had had originally. However this picture is complicated as a May 2016 article in the Journal of Terrorism Research found that resurgent accounts acquire an average (median) of 43.8 followers per day, while regular jihadist accounts accrue only 8.37 followers on average per day.

=== Free speech and terrorism ===
U.S. Rep. Ted Poe, R-Texas, has said that the U.S. Constitution does not apply to terrorists and that they have given up their rights to free speech. He cited a Supreme Court ruling that anyone providing "material support" to a terrorist organization is guilty of a crime, even if that support only involves speaking and association. He also cited terrorist speech as being like child pornography in that it does harm.

== Homeland security subcommittee ==
On December 6, 2011, the US Committee on Homeland Security's Subcommittee on Counterterrorism and Intelligence held a hearing entitled "Jihadist Use of Social Media - How to Prevent Terrorism and Preserve Innovation."

At the hearing, members heard testimony from Will McCants, an analyst for the Center for Naval Analyses, Aaron Weisburd, director of the Society for Internet Research, Brian Jenkins, senior advisor for the Rand Corporation and Evan Kohlmann, senior partner from Flashpoint Global Partners.

McCants stated that while terror groups were actively using social media platforms to further their goals, research did not support the notion that the social media strategies they adopted were proving effective:

We are talking about a relatively small number of people. Because the number of people is so small, it is difficult to say why some become active supporters of al-Qaeda and others do not. What we can say is that the vast majority of people who watch and read al-Qaeda propaganda will never act violently because of it. Put metaphorically, the material may be incendiary but nearly everyone is fireproof. Since that is the case, it is better to spend our resources putting out the fires and issuing warnings about the dangers of fire rather than trying to fireproof everyone or remove incendiary material.

McCants added that he did not believe that closing online user accounts would be effective in stopping radicalization and stated that closing online accounts could even disadvantage U.S. security and intelligence forces:

I do not put much stock in closing online user accounts that do not violate our laws. I also do not put much stock in intervening with well-meaning outreach programs or removing propaganda. There are too many downsides to these approaches. They are also unnecessary. The FBI and local law enforcement in the United States have done an excellent job in finding al-Qaeda supporters online and arresting them before they hurt anyone. They have gotten very good at following the smoke trails and putting out fires.

McCants stressed that not enough research has been conducted on this topic and he would be willing to change his opinion on the matter if there was empirical evidence that proved that social media has a major role in radicalizing youth.

Weisburd stated that any organization that played a part in producing and distributing media for terrorist organizations were in fact supporting terrorism:

I would argue that a service provider who knowingly assists in the distribution of terrorist media is also culpable. While it is in no one's interest to prosecute internet service providers, they must be made to realize that they can neither turn a blind eye to the use of their services by terrorist organizations, nor can they continue to put the onus of identifying and removing terrorist media on private citizens.

Weisburd argued that social media lends an air of legitimacy to content produced by terror organizations and provides terrorist organizations an opportunity to brand their content:

Branding in terrorist media is a sign of authenticity, and terrorist media is readily identifiable as such due to the presence of trademarks known to be associated with particular organizations.

He concluded that the goal of intelligence and security forces should not be to drive all terrorist media offline, but rather to deprive terror groups from the branding power gleaned from social media.

Jenkins stated that the risks associated with al Qaeda's online campaign do not justify an attempt to impose controls on content distributors. Any attempted controls would be costly and would deprive the intelligence officials of a valuable source of information. Jenkins also stated that there was no evidence that attempts to control online content would be possible:

Even China, which has devoted immense resources to controlling social media networks with far fewer concerns about freedom of speech, has been unable to block the micro blogs that flourish on the web. Faced with the shutdown of one site, jihadist communicators merely change names and move to another, dragging authorities into a frustrating game of Whac-a-mole and depriving them of intelligence while they look for the new site. Is this, then the best way to address the problem?"

Kohlmann stated U.S. government officials must do more to pressure social media groups like YouTube, Facebook and Twitter to remove content produced by terror groups:

Unfortunately, current U.S. law gives few incentives for companies like YouTube for volunteering information on illicit activity, or even cooperating when requested by U.S. law enforcement. If such companies are to be trusted to self-police their own professed commitments to fighting hate speech, then they must be held to a public standard which reflects the importance of that not unsubstantial responsibility.

== See also ==
- Alt-tech
- Deradicalization
- Online youth radicalization
- Social media use by the Islamic State
