= Muntada al-Ansar =

Islamist forum page

Muntada al-Ansar was an Islamist forum page associated with Al-Qaeda. The forum's domain was in Malaysia.

== Nick Berg ==
On May 11, 2004, the website of the Islamist forum Muntada al-Ansar reposted a video titled "Sheikh Abu Musab al-Zarqawi slaughters an American", which shows American citizen Nick Berg being decapitated.

The web page, on a site located in Malaysia, was then shut down a few days after by the domain provider.

It is unclear whether al-Zarqawi is one of the men in the video. Both al-Zarqawi and Muntada al-Ansar are associated with the Al-Qaeda movement.

== See also ==
- Abu Musab al-Zarqawi
