= Decapitation in Islam =

Execution in Islamicate jurisdictions

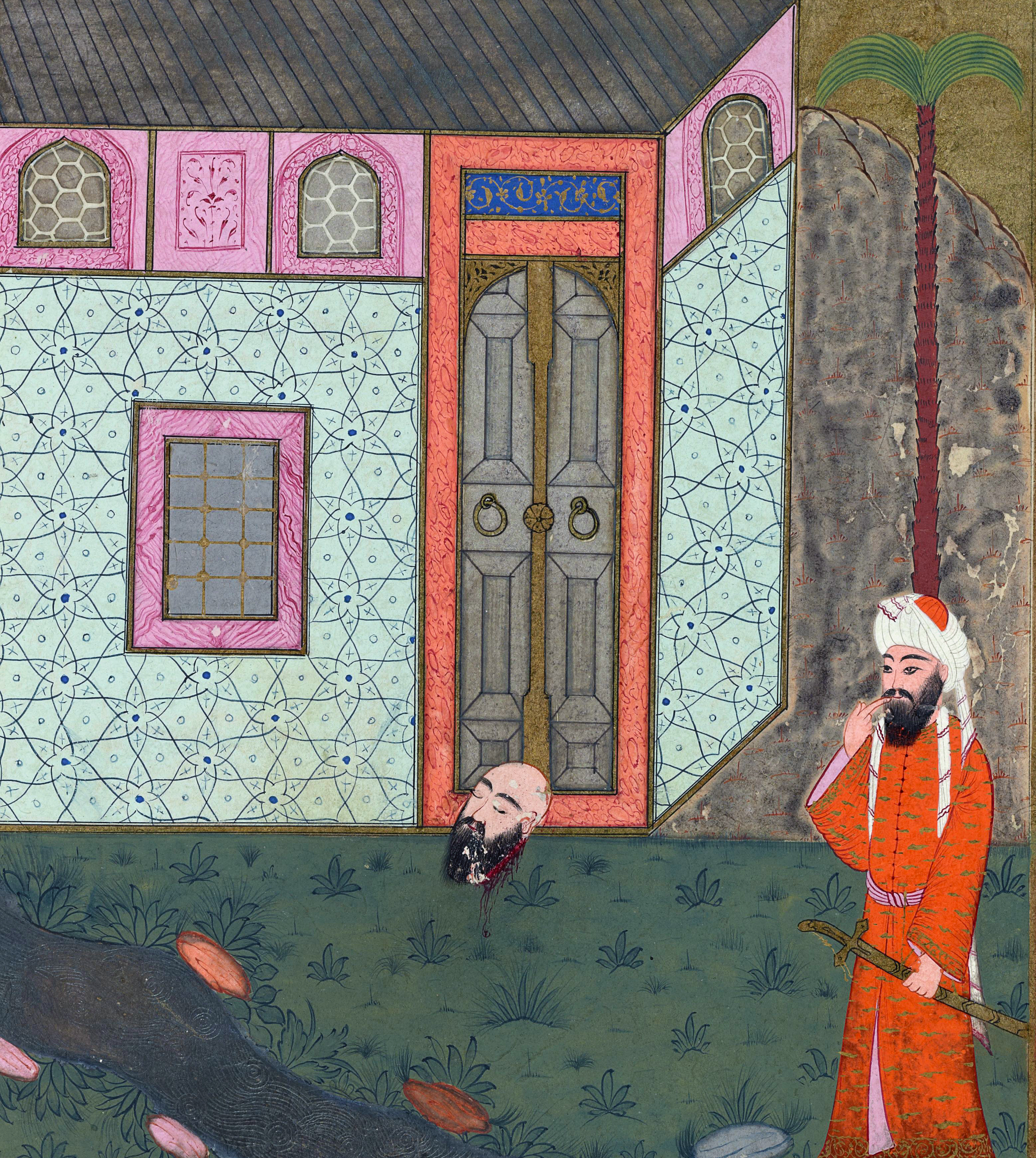
Islamic miniature depicting Hanzala ibn Abi Sufyan watching the severed head of the slave he sent to murder Ali float by

Decapitation was a standard method of capital punishment in pre-modern Islamic law. By the end of the 20th century, its use had been abandoned in most countries. Decapitation is still a legal method of execution in Saudi Arabia and Yemen. It is also a legal method for execution in Zamfara State, Nigeria under Sharia. In Iran, beheading was last used in 2001 according to Amnesty International, but it is no longer in use. In recent decades, extremist Salafi jihadist groups have used beheading as a method of killing captives and terror tactic, with many notable cases involving filming the process to spread propaganda and instill fear.

== Background and context ==
The use of decapitation for punishment continued well into the 20th century in both Islamic and non-Islamic nations. When done properly, it was once considered a humane and honorable method of execution.

== Decapitation in Islamic scripture ==
There is a debate as to whether the Quran discusses decapitation. One surah could potentially be used to provide a justification for decapitation in the context of war:

Now when ye meet in battle those who disbelieve, then it is smiting of the necks until, when ye have routed them, making fast of bonds; and afterward either grace or ransom 'til the war lay down its burdens. (47:4)

Among classical commentators, Fakhr al-Din al-Razi interprets the last sentence of 8:12 to mean striking at the enemies in any way possible, from their head to the tips of their extremities. Al-Qurtubi reads the reference to striking at the necks as conveying the gravity and severity of the fighting. For al-Qurtubi, al-Tabari, and Ibn Kathir, the expression indicates the brevity of the act, as it is confined to battle and is not a continuous command.

Some commentators have suggested that terrorists use alternative interpretations of these surahs to justify the decapitation of captives, however there is agreement among scholars that they have a different meaning. Furthermore, according to Rachel Saloom, surah 47:4 goes on to recommend generosity or ransom when waging war, and it refers to a period when Muslims were persecuted and had to fight for their survival.

== Decapitation in Islamic law ==
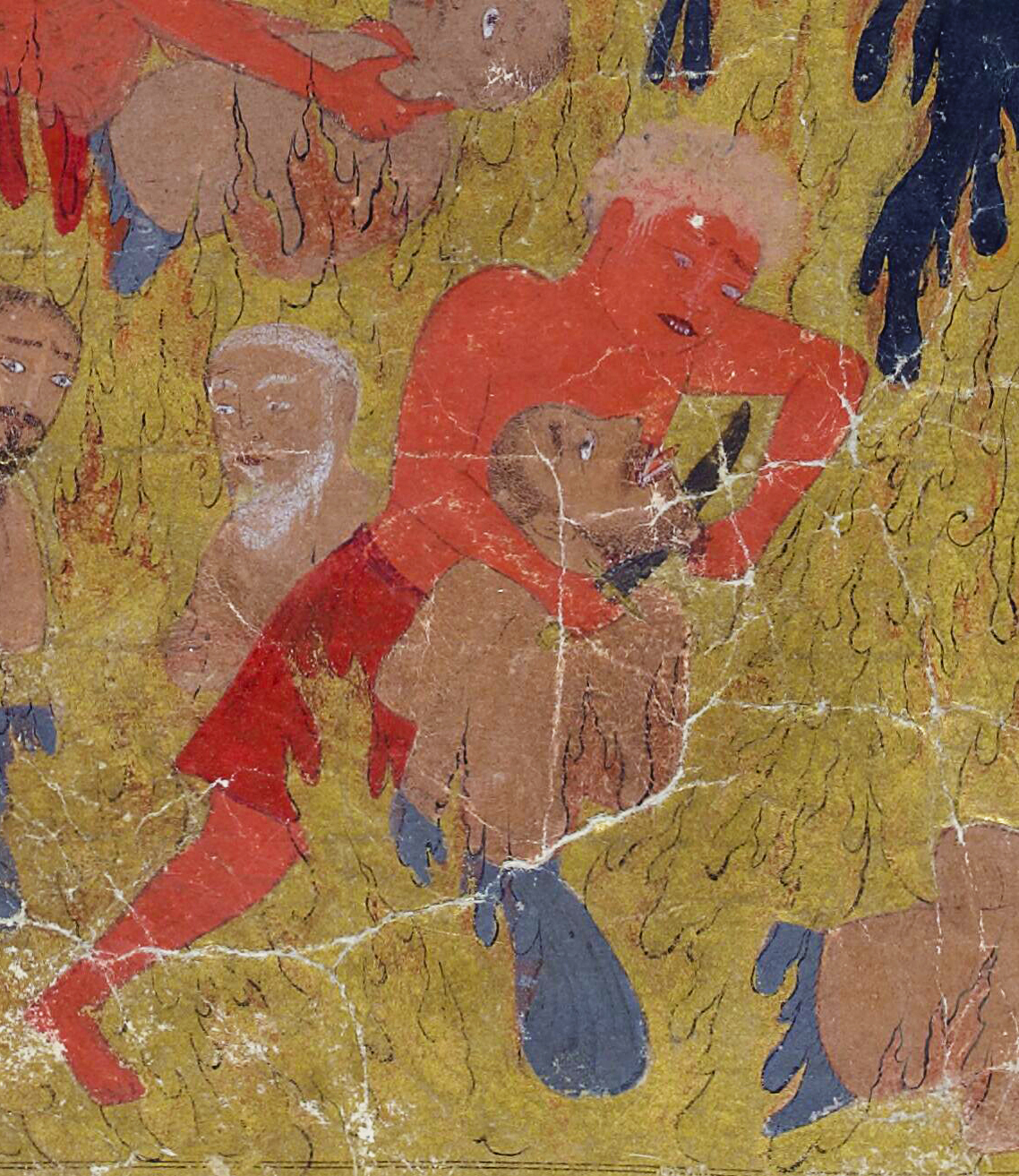
Islamic miniature depicting a member of the Zabaniyah beheading a man in Hell

Decapitation was the normal method of executing the death penalty under classical Islamic law. It was also, together with hanging, one of the ordinary methods of execution in the Ottoman Empire.

Currently, Saudi Arabia is the only country in the world which uses decapitation within its Islamic legal system. The majority of executions carried out by the government of Saudi Arabia are public beheadings, which usually cause mass gatherings but are not allowed to be photographed or filmed.

According to Amnesty, decapitation have been carried out by state authorities in Iran as recently as 2001, but as of 2014 is no longer in use. It is a legal form of execution in Yemen, but the punishment has been suspended. It is also a legal form of execution under Sharia in Zamfara State, Nigeria.

== Historical occurrences ==
- The Islamic followers of Muhammad executed the men of the Jewish Arab tribe of Banu Qurayza for a treaty violation that lead to the deaths of many Muslims, with several hundreds killed in 627.
- After the Battle of Hattin (1187), Saladin personally beheaded Raynald of Châtillon; a Christian knight who served in the Second Crusade and organized attacks against Islam's two holiest cities.
- Forces of the Ottoman Empire invaded and laid siege to the city of Otranto and its citadel in 1480. According to a traditional account, after capture, more than 800 of its inhabitants – who refused to convert to Islam – were beheaded. They are known as the "Martyrs of Otranto". Historicity of this account has been questioned by modern scholars.
- Muhammad Ahmad declared himself Mahdi in 1880 and led Jihad against the Ottoman Empire and their British allies. He and his followers beheaded opponents, Christian and Muslim alike including the British general Charles Gordon.

== Modern use by non-state actors ==
Extremist Salafi jihadist groups such as ISIS and Jama'at al-Tawhid wal-Jihad have used beheading as a method of killing captives. Since 2002, ISIS have circulated beheading videos as a form of terror and propaganda. Their actions have been condemned by militant and other terrorist groups, as well as by mainstream Islamic scholars and organizations, who have contrasted Saudi government executions, which conform to standards that minimize pain, with the non-state actors who have "chosen a slow, torturous sawing method to terrorize the Western audience".

== See also ==
- Beheading video
- Beheading in the Ottoman Empire
