= Killing of Kim Sun-il =

South Korean terrorism victim (1970–2004)

Kim Sun-il
- Kim c. 2003
- Born: 13 September 1970; Busan, South Korea
- Died: 22 June 2004 (aged 33); Fallujah, Iraq
- Cause of death: Murder by decapitation
- Body discovered: 23 June 2004
- Occupation: Translator

Korean name
- Hangul: 김선일
- Hanja: 金鮮一
- RR: Gim Seonil
- MR: Kim Sŏnil

Kim Sun-il (Korean: 김선일; 13 September 1970 – c. 22 June 2004) was a South Korean interpreter and Christian missionary who was kidnapped and murdered by decapitation in Iraq.

== Early life and education ==
Kim was born into a poor family and his biological mother died when he was nine years old.

He was fluent in Arabic, holding a graduate degree in the language from Seoul's Hankuk University of Foreign Studies in February 2003. He also had degrees in English and theology, and had hoped to become a missionary in the Middle East.

== Kidnapping ==
=== Arrival ===
Kim arrived in Iraq on 15 June 2003, working for Gana General Trading Company, a South Korean company under contract to the American military. On 30 May 2004, he was kidnapped in Fallujah — about 50 km (31 mi) west of Baghdad — by the Islamist group Jama'at al-Tawhid wal-Jihad and held as a hostage. The group, which was allegedly led by Abu Musab al-Zarqawi, killed him on or about 22 June when South Korea refused to meet their demands of cancelling its plans of sending 3,000 more troops to Iraq and withdrawing the 660 military medics and engineers already there. (This would put South Korea behind only the United Kingdom in number of non-U.S. coalition troops in Iraq.)

=== Murder ===
Jama'at al-Tawhid wal-Jihad had initially set a 21 June deadline in a videotape showing Kim pleading for his life. However, on 22 June, after initial reports that the militants had given their hostage more time, Al Jazeera television reported that they had received a videotape footage of Kim being decapitated by five men, like hostages Nick Berg and Eugene Armstrong in Iraq, Paul Johnson in Saudi Arabia, and Daniel Pearl in Pakistan. The report was subsequently confirmed by the South Korean government. In the murder video, Kim is wearing an orange jumpsuit and blindfolded. One of the captors reads a statement and then another takes out a knife and decapitates him. The statement said: "Korean citizens, you were warned, your hands were the ones who killed him. Enough lies, enough cheatings. Your soldiers are here not for the sake of Iraqis, but for cursed America."

The president of Gana General Trading is said to have known about the kidnapping almost immediately, but he did not report it until after the videotape aired. He had consulted a lawyer, who argued that the situation must be managed without government intervention if Kim was to be saved. It is claimed that government officials had little time to react. However, there are also reports that a videotape of Kim in captivity, in which he appears calm and openly criticizes U.S. intervention in Iraq, was delivered to the Associated Press Television News offices in Baghdad in the beginning of June, and that on 3 June an AP reporter in Seoul contacted the South Korean foreign ministry asking if they knew of a missing person with a name similar to Kim Sun-il's.

== Reactions ==
South Korean President Roh Moo-hyun's National Security Council issued a statement condemning the killing. South Korea's Ministry of Information and Communication banned the Kim Sun-il murder video and was trying to prevent it from being spread. The unedited video was available on the website Ogrish.com during the summer of 2004. The website received DDoS attacks as a result of hosting the footage.

U.S. President George W. Bush condemned the killers, saying: "The free world cannot be intimidated by the brutal actions of these barbaric people."

Reports and editorials in South Korea's press reflected despair at the death of the hostage Kim Sun-il in Iraq, but also defiance toward the kidnappers. South Korean TV stations interrupted their schedules when Mr Kim's body was discovered and subsequently broadcast special rolling news programmes. "Kim Sun-il killed - body identified" was the headline in the independent daily The Dong-A Ilbo. "Kim Sun-il ends up dead" was how the popular daily JoongAng Ilbo reported it. In South Korea, thousands of people rallied against the South Korean military going to Iraq, and to express anger about Kim's death, they burned portraits of the mastermind of his killing, Abu Musab al-Zarqawi. The South Korean government eventually passed a law barring passport issuance for 1–3 years to South Koreans who "damage national prestige"; the law was interpreted as an attempt to curtail Christian missionaries, especially after the 2007 South Korean hostage crisis in Afghanistan.

== See also ==
- 2007 South Korean hostage crisis in Afghanistan
