= Abdalaziz Alhamza =

Syrian journalist (born 1991)

- Born: Abdalaziz Alhamza; 23 July 1991 (age 35); Raqqa, Syria
- Education: Al-Furat University
- Occupations: Journalist; Human Rights Defender; Activist; IT Trainer

Abdalaziz Alhamza (Arabic: عبدالعزيز الحمزة) (sometimes Aziz Alhamza, Abdul Aziz Al-Hamza, Abdel Aziz al-Hamza; born in Raqqa, 1991), is a Syrian journalist, human rights defender activist and IT trainer. Alhamza is an International Security Program fellow at New America, he is also a fellow and Next Generation Leader at the McCain Institute., He is the CEO and one of the leaders of The NewNow which is a global group of rising leaders tackling the world’s toughest challenges. He is also the founder and spokesperson of Raqqa is Being Slaughtered Silently (RBSS) which is a nonpartisan, independent organization that exposes the atrocities committed by ISIS & other groups in Syria as well as the Syrian government. Alhamza started non-violent protests and demonstrations against the Syrian government in 2011 and was arrested by the government three times in 2012. The Islamic State Group (ISIS) interrogated him more than one time about his activism. After ISIS took control of his hometown, Raqqa in January 2014, he escaped to Turkey and started Raqqa is Being Slaughtered Silently (RBSS) with his friends to show the reality of life in Raqqa and ISIS. Alhamza was awarded the Wonder of Humanity award by Sir Richard Branson and Virgin Unite. in 2015, Alhamza received CPJ International Press Freedom Awards by the Committee to Protect Journalists and was named a Global Thinkers by Foreign Policy. In 2016, he has awarded the Ischia International Journalism Award, Civil Courage Prize and other awards on behalf of RBSS. Alhamza was featured in "City of Ghosts" a documentary that followed the Journey of Alhamza and his colleagues. Alhamza graduated with a degree in biochemistry from the faculty of science in Raqqa which is part of Al-Furat University.

In January 2016, the International Business Times described RBSS as "the most reliable source of information from inside Raqqa." German historian Michael Wolffsohn has compared RBSS to White Rose, the resistance organization during the Third Reich.

On February 18, 2016, Alhamza was described as being 24 years old. He currently lives in exile in Berlin.

== Career ==
Alhamza wrote many articles about Syria and Raqqa, especially focusing on the Islamic State. One of his most prominent articles appeared in The New York Times, "Bombs May Not Defeat ISIS (but Maybe the Internet Will)".

Alhamza wrote an op-ed and letter to the president of the United States of America Donald Trump which was published on Fox News.

Alhamza is an International Security Program fellow at New America (organization), he is also a fellow and Next Generation Leader at the McCain Institute.

== Early life and education ==
Alhamza studied biology at Al-Furat University in Raqqa, from which he graduated in 2013. While he was a student, he organized nonviolent protests against the Syrian government.

== RBSS ==
Alhamza acted as a media activist and organizer of nonviolent protests during the early period of the uprising against the Assad regime, Alhamza was arrested by Syrian authorities three times in 2012. After ISIS took over Raqqa in January 2014, that group also allegedly interrogated him on multiple occasions. Under threat from both the Assad and ISIS camps, Alhamza escaped to Turkey, where he and other journalists founded RBSS. Threats from the Islamic State in Turkey caused him to flee to Germany.

RBSS documents life under ISIS on social media and through photographs and videos that are smuggled abroad. Alhamza, like most exiled RBSS members, now lives in Germany. As of November 2015, Alhamza was working with seven RBSS members outside Raqqa to publish information gathered by twelve members living in or near Raqqa. In January 2016, the International Business Times stated that 17 RBSS members were "working inside Raqqa."

"Since April 2014," reported the Huffington Post in November 2015, RBSS members "have secretly produced the most sustained coverage of life under Islamic State control." Alhamza told the Post, "We are fighting for our city....We don’t have weapons, but we have our pens or our website or whatever. We are fighting online." He added: "We cover everything because our duty is for our city." Alhamza admitted to the Post that ISIS had made it increasingly difficult for his group to do its work. "All of us," he said, "are accepting that any one of us will be killed at anytime or anywhere."

"We won’t stop," Alhamza told Roger Cohen in February 2016. "We have too many friends and family dead. The only way we will stop is if ISIS kills us all or we go back home."

ISIS has killed four RBSS members. One of them was Ibrahim Abdel Qader, who was beheaded on October 30, 2015, at age 22. Qader had been active in publicizing and documenting ISIS atrocities.

== Other activities ==
Alhamza has spoken widely about RBSS. In February 2016, he spoke to the German Council on Foreign Relations in Berlin. He spoke at the International Journalism Festival in April 2016.

He is scheduled to speak at the Oslo Freedom Forum in May 2016.

== Honors and awards ==
RBSS won the 2015 International Press Freedom Award from the Committee to Protect Journalists. Alhamza accepted the award in New York on 25 November 2015 on behalf of the organization.

Amhamza also accepted the 2015 Foreign Policy Global Thinkers Award on behalf of RBSS.

Writing for the Pittsburgh Post-Gazette In February 2017, Garry Kasparov and Thor Halvorssen noted Alhamaza's work as a "noble struggle against tyranny...despite the danger"

== Film City of Ghosts ==
Alhamza is featured in City of Ghosts, directed, produced, and filmed by Academy Award–nominated and Emmy–winning filmmaker Matthew Heineman. City Of Ghosts was listed as one of 15 out of 170 submitted films included in the Oscar Documentary Feature shortlist for the 2018 awards.

City of Ghosts follows the journey of Raqqa is Being Slaughtered Silently – a handful of anonymous activists who banded together after their homeland was taken over by ISIS in 2014. With deeply personal access, the film follows them as they face the realities of life undercover, on the run, and in exile all whilst risking their lives.
