= Hamoud Al-Mousa =

Syrian journalist and activist

- Born: Hamoud Al-Mousa; 5 February 1993 (age 33); Raqqa, Syria
- Education: Al-Furat University
- Occupations: Journalist; Human Rights Defender; Activist
- Parent: Mohamed Al-Mousa (father)

Hamoud Al-Mousa (born in Raqqa; 5 February 1993) is a Syrian journalist and activist. He is the co-founder and spokesperson for Raqqa is Being Slaughtered Silently (RBSS), a group of citizen journalists who report on the terrorist acts committed by ISIS in Syria.

In January 2016, the International Business Times described RBSS as “the most reliable source of information from inside Raqqa.” German historian Michael Wolffsohn has compared RBSS to White Rose, the resistance organization during the Third Reich.

On December 15, 2013, Al-Mousa was described as being 20 years old. He currently lives in exile in Turkey. He is living in USA now.

== Early life and education ==
Born in Raqqa, Al-Mousa studied law at Al-Furat University. He did not complete his studies because the Syrian revolution started when he was in the first semester. While he was a student, he organized nonviolent protests against the Syrian government.

== RBSS ==
Al-Mousa acted as a media activist and organizer of nonviolent protests during the early period of the uprising against the Assad regime, Al-Mousa was arrested by Syrian authorities four times in 2011-2012. Al-Mousa also was arrested by Ahrar Al Sham in 2013. In 2013, Al-Mousa was shot in the left leg by Lewaa Thwaar Al-Raqqa they were with Al Nusra. After ISIS took over Raqqa in January 2014, Al-Mousa escaped to Turkey, where he and other journalists founded RBSS. Threats from the Islamic State in Turkey caused him to flee to Germany then to the USA.

RBSS documents life under ISIS on social media and through photographs and videos that are smuggled abroad. Al-Mousa, like most exiled RBSS members, lived in Germany, but now he lives in USA. As of November 2015, Al-Mousa was working with seven RBSS members outside Raqqa to publish information gathered by twelve members living in or near Raqqa. In January 2016, the International Business Times stated that 17 RBSS members were “working inside Raqqa.”

“Since April 2014,” reported the Huffington Post in November 2015, RBSS members “have secretly produced the most sustained coverage of life under Islamic State control.” Al-Hamza -Member of RBSS- told the Post, “We are fighting for our city. We don’t have weapons, but we have our pens or our website or whatever. We are fighting online.” He added: “We cover everything because our duty is for our city.” Al-Hamza admitted to the Post that ISIS had made it increasingly difficult for his group to do its work. “All of us,” he said, “are accepting that any one of us will be killed at any time or anywhere.”

ISIS has killed four RBSS members. One of them was Ibrahim Abdel Qader, who was beheaded on October 30, 2015, at age 22. Qader had been active in publicizing and documenting ISIS atrocities.

== Honors and awards ==
RBSS won the 2015 International Press Freedom Award from the Committee to Protect Journalists. Al-Mousa accepted the award in New York on 25 November 2015 on behalf of the organization.

Al-Mousa also accepted the 2015 Foreign Policy Global Thinkers Award on behalf of RBSS.

Writing for the Pittsburgh Post-Gazette in February 2017, Garry Kasparov and Thor Halvorssen noted Al-Mousa's work as a "noble struggle against tyranny.despite the danger"

== Film City of Ghosts ==
Al-Mousa is journalist featured in the film City of Ghosts.

While in high-school, Hamoud became active in the Syrian revolution and started filming the protests in the streets of Raqqa. He later embedded with the Free Syrian Army as they fought to liberate Raqqa from Assad's forces. When ISIS took over his hometown in 2014, he became a vocal critic of the terrorist organization and helped found RBSS. ISIS eventually put a bounty out for Hamoud and he was forced to leave Raqqa. After ISIS was unable to track Hamoud down, they instead arrested and assassinated his father, Mohamed Al-Mousa, later publicly releasing a video showing the execution. A few months later, Hamoud learned that one of his brothers had also been assassinated by ISIS while another brother has disappeared. Now living in exile, Hamoud is determined to continue his work with RBSS. He named his first child Mohamed, in honor of his deceased father.

== Personal life ==
Al-Mousa's father was killed by ISIS in Syria.

Al-Mousa's old brother also was killed by ISIS in Idlib, Syria.

Al-Mousa's young brother was arrested by ISIS since 2015 in Syria.
