= Václav Havel Prize =

The Václav Havel Prize may refer to:

- The Václav Havel Prize for Creative Dissent, honouring individuals "who engage in creative dissent, exhibiting courage and creativity to challenge injustice and live in truth".
- The Václav Havel Human Rights Prize, honouring "outstanding" civil society action in defence of human rights, in Europe and beyond.
