= Omar Mohammed (disambiguation) =

Omar Mohammed (born 1996) is an Iraqi historian.

Omar Mohammed or Omar Mohamed may also refer to:

- Omar Mohamed (born 1996), Somali footballer
- Omar Mohamed (gymnast) (born 1999), Egyptian artistic gymnast
- Omar Mohammed (Saudi footballer) (born 1993)
- Omar Bakri Muhammad, Syrian Islamist militant leader
