= Danilo Maldonado Machado =

Cuban graffiti artist and human rights activist (born 1983)

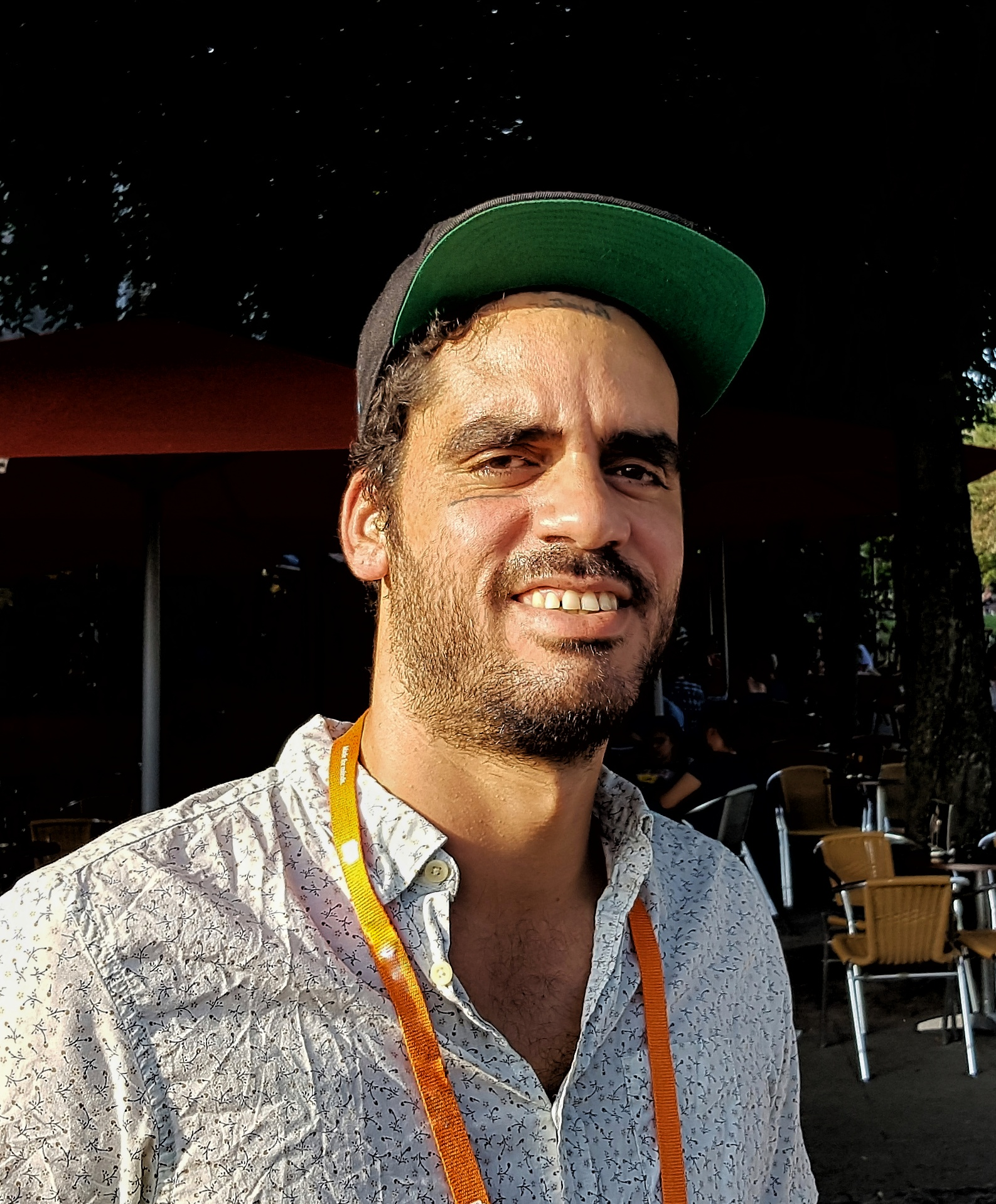
- Maldonado in 2017
- Born: April 1, 1983 (age 43); Camagüey, Cuba
- Education: Miami Dade College
- Occupations: Artist; human rights activist
- Years active: 2008–present
- Awards: Vaclav Havel Prize for Creative Dissent

Danilo Maldonado Machado (born April 1, 1983), also known as El Sexto (The Sixth), is a Cuban graffiti artist and human rights activist who has been arrested and imprisoned several times in Cuba. He was arrested in the United States in 2018 and charged with a felony, aggravated stalking, for repeatedly violating a restraining order filed by his ex-girlfriend Alexandra Martinez. He pled guilty in 2019 of aggravated stalking (which involves a credible threat to harm the victim) and was released from prison where he was held for one year without possibility of bail. He was also charged with threatening her with violence. He was set for deportation back to Cuba but was allowed to remain in the US as a result of the likelihood of persecution in Cuba. He is a convicted felon on two years of probation.

His graffiti art is a form of protest, criticizing the abuse of the Cuban people at the hands of the Castro regime, and he is “frequently detained by the police under any pretext.” He has been called “a graffiti artist who does not forgive the Cuban regime.” A report in April 2015 stated that he was, at that time, “the most persecuted of Cuban artists.”

Cuban writer and artist Orlando Luis Pardo Lazo has praised Maldonado as “a free artist widely hated for his courage and his genius.” Cuban dissident Rosa María Payá has said that although born under totalitarianism, Maldonado has somehow managed to be a free spirit and “the Cuban regime does not forgive that.”

== Early life and education ==
Maldonado's mother is named Maria Victoria; his grandmother's name is Maria Caridad. His sister is Indira Maldonado.

Maldonado studied at Miami Dade College (MDC) during the spring 2014 semester, when that institution hosted 15 students from Cuba as part of a new program sponsored by the Miami-based Foundation for Human Rights in Cuba (FHRC). While at MDC, Maldonado studied sociology, computers, psychology, business, and English. In an article by Maldonado that appeared in the student newspaper on February 13, 2014, entitled “Thank You Miami Dade College,” he “marveled at the differences between the two countries and the freedom of expression” in the U.S.

“Shock is what I felt when I learned that here you only need five students in order to form a group of some sort,” Maldonado wrote, “while in my country, the only group for the youth to join is the UJC, the Union of Young Communists, assuming they are not expelled from school, like San Miguel Molina, who got thrown out of medical school for having contrasting political views.” He left Miami in mid 2014. Juan Blanco, executive director at the office of the president of Miami Dade College, later described Maldonado as “the kind of person that is very hard to not like....Very cooperative and willing to give a hand [to those] who need it. [He] felt committed to changing the Cuban system through his art.”

== July 2014 arrest ==
He was detained and without communications for several days.[6] He was reportedly held at the Vivac el Calabazar penal colony near Havana.Writer and photographer Orlando Luis Pardo Lazo reported on Facebook that Maldonado's mother and sister had tried to visit him, but had not been allowed to do so. Pardo Lazo also suggested that Maldonado was being targeted as an act of reprisal, and that the artist had been “denied access to everyday hygienic items such as soap, toothpaste, a towel, and a toothbrush,” and stated that, to all intents and purposes, Maldonado had “disappeared.”[citation needed]

” His imprisonment was protested by organizations such as the Ladies in White. On July 9, it was reported that he had been held without visitation for three days and that authorities planned to prosecute him the next day. He was accused of making a verbal threat. His mother and sister were prohibited from visiting him. On July 10, 2014, he was put through a trial. He was released afterwards but was required to report to the authorities every Wednesday and Friday thereafter.

== December 2014 arrest ==
On Christmas 2014, Maldonado was detained on his way to Parque Central in Havana, where he was planning to put on a performance mocking the regime; he had with him two pigs whom he had named “Fidel” and “Raúl.” He was going to release the pigs for people to try to catch; the winners would get to keep the pigs. A January 7, 2015, report stated that a writ of habeas corpus filed by the Cubalex organization on behalf of Maldonado had been rejected, and that Maldonado consequently remained in Valle Grande prison, where he had been held since Christmas. As of January 25, 2015, Maldonado had spent a month in prison.

In late January, a text and drawings he had sent from Valle Grande prison were posted on multiple websites. Maldonado said he had met a fellow prisoner, convicted of forgery, who had a Castro tattoo. “I explained that I was an opponent of the Castro regime and that gentleman that he was engraved on his skin was to blame that I was a prisoner.” The man said that he was “son of the motherland,” that Fidel had given him a house, and that such things did not happen anywhere else in the world. Maldonado wrote that evil can never triumph over good, violence over art and reason, death over life and love. He described his incarceration as a “nightmare” that only served to legitimize his work and confirm the harshness of the Castro gouvernement. Maldonado's grandmother stated that her grandson “was sleeping on the floor for two months because for him, as for many other prisoners, there was no bed.”

In March 2015, several Latin American artists boycotted the Havana Biennial in solidarity with Maldonado and artist and activist Tania Bruguera. On March 28, a solidarity concert was held in Havana “from sunset until late at night.” Among the performers were Tania Bruguera, Maikel Extremo, Wichy Vedado, El Opuesto, Raper Isac, and Porno para Ricardo. The Foundation for Human Rights in Cuba (FHRC) fought for Maldonado's release, calling him a political prisoner and demanding his immediate and unconditional release; José Luis Martinez, Director of Communications for the FHRC, called him “an exceptional artist...and a good person who believes in the basic right of Free Expression, as well as all basic human rights, and democracy.” His friend and artivist in Havana Lia Villares launched a Twitter campaign with the hashtag #FreeElSexto and created a petition.

Meeting with Cuban leader Raúl Castro at the Summit of the Americas in Panama in April 2015, U.S. President Barack Obama brought up Maldonado's case. In the same month, artists and activists paid tribute to Maldonado and fellow prisoners with an interactive spoken-word performance in Times Square in New York City. In Panama, Maldonado's friend Gorki Águila, a musician and director of the band Porno para Ricardo, performed a song in solidarity with him.

In September 2015, Maldonado began a hunger strike for his freedom. It lasted 21 days until Cuban officials said he would be freed if he stopped the strike. But, he wasn't. In October 2015, he began a second hunger strike for four days. He was freed on October 20, 2015. He was taken in a white van and dropped off at his mother's home in Arroyo Arenas. His official letter of freedom listed "desacato" as his charges. He was held without trial for a total of 10 months.

On November 26, 2016 following Fidel Castro's death, Maldonado was arrested for a video mocking his death. Maldonado was never officially charged for any offense and it was determined that the government illegally imprisoned him. On December 16, 2016 American Attorney Kimberley Motley traveled to Cuba to represent Maldonado and was subsequently arrested. President of the Human Rights Foundation, Thor Halvorssen, called for Motley's and Maldonado's immediate release and called the arrest an “...outrageous abuse is the sad reality of Cuba’s ongoing totalitarianism. They first arrest prodemocracy activist El Sexto for criticizing and mocking the deceased ex-president, and now they arrest the lawyer that has traveled to Cuba to defend him,".

Maldonado emigrated to the United States in January 2017.

== Honors and awards ==
It was reported on April 15, 2015, that Maldonado had been selected as a winner of the year's Václav Havel Prize for Creative Dissent, awarded by the Human Rights Foundation at the annual Oslo Freedom Forum.

== Personal life ==
In September 2012, Maldonado was tattooed with an image of Oswaldo Payá Sardiñas (1952–2012), the founder of the Christian liberation movement who sought to reform the Castro system.

He also has a tattoo of Laura Pollan, the founder of Ladies in White, the Cuban opposition group.
