= Ruqia Hassan =

Syrian journalist

- Born: ca. 1985
- Disappeared: August 2015; Raqqa, Syria
- Died: September 2015 (aged 30); Raqqa, Syria
- Cause of death: Execution
- Other name: Nissan Ibrahim
- Education: University of Aleppo
- Occupation: Journalist
- Organization: Raqqa is Being Slaughtered Silently

Ruqia Hassan Mohammed (Arabic: رقية حسن محمد, ca. 1985 – ca. September 2015), also known by her pen name Nissan Ibrahim (Arabic: نيسان إبراهيم), was a Syrian independent journalist and blogger based in Raqqa, Syria. She was a member of the activist group known as Raqqa Is Being Slaughtered Silently, and wrote frequently under the pen name Nissan Ibrahim (Arabic: نيسان إبراهيم). She is thought to be the first identified female citizen journalist executed by the Islamic State of Iraq and the Levant.

== Personal ==
Ruqia Hassan was born Ruqia Hassan Mohammed in 1985 in Raqqa, Syria. She came from a family of affluent Syrian Kurds, whose village of origin located close to the city of Kobani. Her father was a devout Muslim and businessman who kept several lots and buildings within Raqqa. Hassan's father married two women, she had one sister and five half-brothers from her father’s second wife. Hassan's sister is a doctor.

She graduated with a degree in philosophy from the University of Aleppo in Aleppo, Syria. In 2011, Hassan became an active and early member of the opposition to the president of Syria, Bashar al-Assad, after the start of the Syrian Civil War. She remained in the city after the seizure of power by rebels in 2013, and still when the Islamic militant group the Islamic State of Iraq and the Levant (ISIL) gained power later that same year.

== Career ==
Hassan was mostly known for her informal and personal form of journalism. She was an active member of Raqqa Is Being Silently Slaughtered (RBSS), an activist group that works to document the violation of human rights caused by ISIL's rise to prominence within the region. Through Facebook Hassan, using the pen name Nissan Ibrahim, wrote about day-to-day life under the occupation of ISIL along with statuses about her interests. She provided updates concerning the city's worsening conditions and frequent airstrikes from the combined coalition and Russian forces. Her posts regularly criticized and mocked policies enacted by the militant group, such as prohibiting the use of wireless hotspots. Her posts varied in tone from angry to darkly humorous.

The founder of RBSS, Abu Mohammed claims that he attempted to dissuade Hassan from continuing her posts; encouraging her to switch identities and remove personal photos of herself from her accounts. Others also claimed that they were worried that her posts would lead her to become a prominent target for the radical Jihadists; ultimately, she continued to post. On July 21, 2015, Hassan abruptly stopped posting to social media.

== Death ==
Raqqa is located in Syria and shown relative to Syria's capital city Damascus.

Before Ruqia Hassan's disappearance, she had been under surveillance by ISIL, as the group believed her posts to social media to be acts of espionage in collaboration with the Free Syrian Army. Hassan was abducted by ISIL sometime around late-July or August 2015, and it was not known what happened to her from the time of her disappearance to her execution by ISIL sometime in September or October 2015. However, her family only received official confirmation of her execution in January 2016, at which time it was released through media.

Between the time of her capture and execution, Jihadists gained access to her accounts and began messaging friends in an attempt to acquire information about other possible dissenters within and outside the region. Due to the activity on her social media accounts, Hassan was still believed to be alive. According to members of RBSS, the group continued to be active on her Facebook account and stating she was still alive until early January 2016, just as news of her execution began to widely circulate.

She wrote in her final post to social media "I'm in Raqqa and I received death threats. When ISIL arrest me and kill me it's ok, because while they will cut off my head, I will have dignity, which is better than living in humiliation."

== Context ==
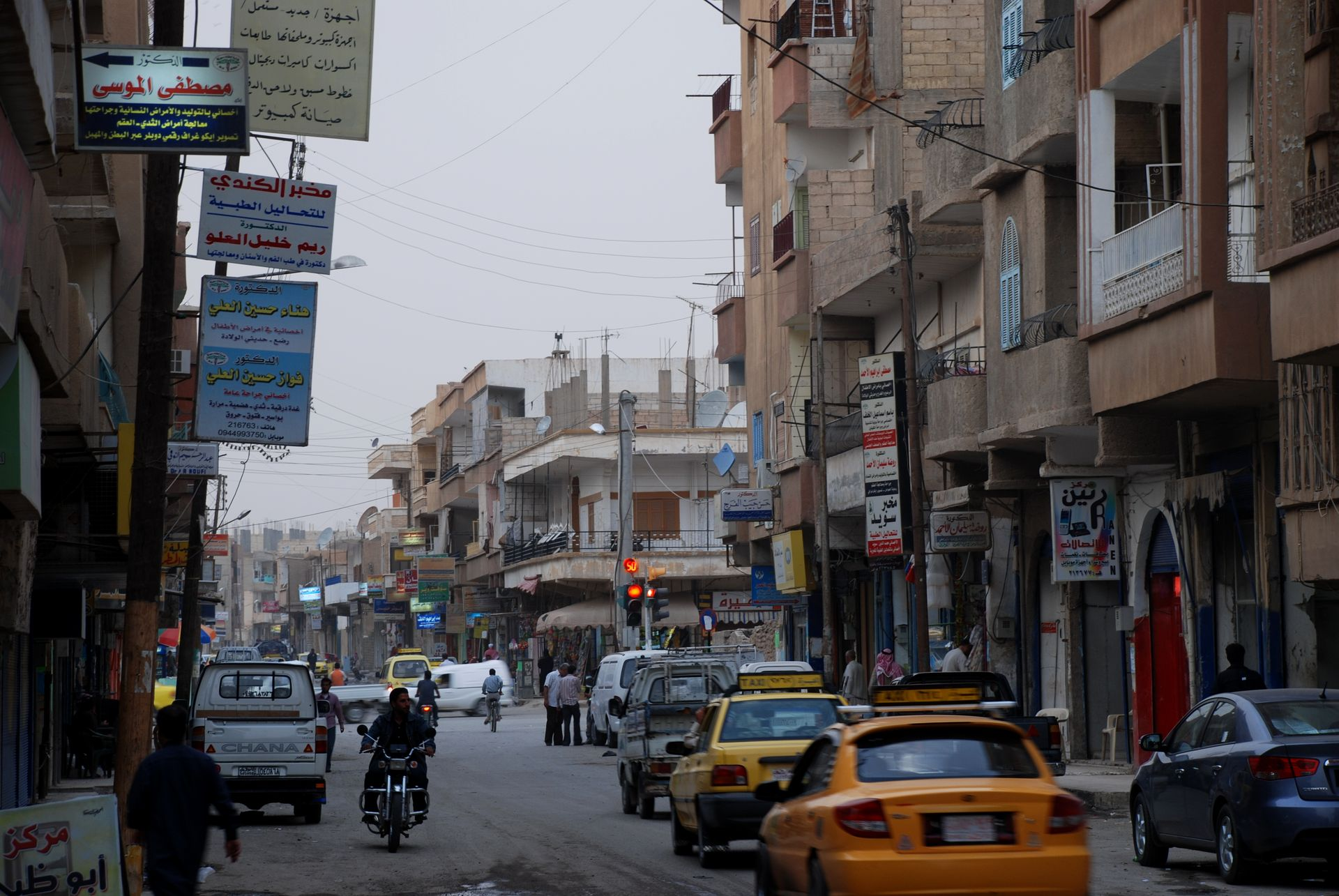
Raqqa, Syria, which in 2014 became the capital of the Islamic State.

Of six journalists executed by ISIL over a nine-month period from 2015 through 2016, Ruquia Hassan was one of those six. The others have been identified as Zahir Al-Shurqat, Ahmed Mohamed al-Mousa, Ibrahim Abd al-Qader, Fares Hamadi, and Naji Jerf.

In 2014, ISIL gained control of the city of Raqqa, and was secured as the head of the Caliphate. Numerous recruits of the group from abroad and within Syria began to immigrate to the new capital to continue their cause. The group also continued to steadily produce media content to draw in supporters to Raqqa, and strengthen their hold of the city. As a result, the conditions within the city began to rapidly deteriorate. Oppressive new rules were enacted, and the breaking of these new laws would lead to frequently public discipline or execution.

ISIL quieted any criticism in Raqqa and nearby cities through fatal force. Vocal opponents of ISIL and anyone believed to be actively transmitting intel about the group were met with executions. The increased suppression was believed to come directly from the deaths of well-known members caused by coalition forces, helped by the supply of inside information about the group.

Journalists, a large portion of the vocal dissidents against the regime, became a prominent group targeted by the organization. Work done by journalists like Hassan caused them to be publicly labeled as spies. Her execution was just one example of a larger overall movement to suppress the transmission of the truth about the group's actions by the Syrian and Turkish journalistic communities.

== Impact ==
At the time of her death, Syria Direct identified Hassan as the fifth journalist to be murdered at the hands of ISIL since October 2014. It has also been speculated that she was the first citizen female journalist to be executed by the group. However, members of RBSS claim that she is not the first female journalist in the region to be killed, but the exact data regarding these claims does not currently exist.

Despite multiple warnings from her peers to cease postings about the state of Raqqa, Hassan continued her work. A cousin close to the Hassan family stated in an interview that he believes that the reporting on her actions will push others to continue her efforts, despite the threat of punishment from extremists. Another cousin is also quoted in the same article as saying "She became a hero in our village for her courage and being the voice of truth. She was fearless [...] A little Kurdish girl from Kobani faced a brutal militia and exposed them. She will never be forgotten."

== Reactions ==
In response to Hassan's execution, Irina Bokova, the head of the agency United Nations Educational, Scientific, and Cultural Organization (UNESCO) issued the statement:

"I condemn the murder of Ruqia Hassan [...] I wish to pay tribute to this journalist's courageous stand for human rights and fundamental freedoms in the most difficult of circumstances and her defiance of the brutal campaign that violent extremists are waging to suppress individuals' freedom to think, speak, and act."

While Furat al-Wafaa, a former member of the activist group RBSS, spoke to the news company Syria Direct in response to Hassan's arrest and execution. He said of her death and ISIL's suppression of dissenters:

"Ruqia continuously challenged IS and often reported on air strikes on Raqqa as they happened [...] IS always wants to keep the sword hovering over the people's necks [...] They want their fighters and supporters to know that the Islamic State is capable of taking revenge against those who speak against them."

After the news of Hassan's death became public knowledge in January 2016 the founder of RBSS, Abu Mohammed, confirmed her execution by the extremist group and posted her final status update to his Twitter page.

== See also ==
- List of journalists killed during the Syrian Civil War
- Killing of captives by ISIL
- Kurds in Syria
