= Murat Arslan =

Turkish judge

Murat Arslan (born 1974) is a former Turkish judge active in the Judges and Prosecutors Union and a political prisoner.

== Biography ==
He is married and father of two children.

He graduated from the faculty of law of the Istanbul University in 1999. In 2001 he began to work at the court of accounts. He has been the chair of YARSAV from 16 March 2011 to 23 July 2016. YARSAV was closed by a decree published in the Official Gazette on the 23 July 2016. On 26 October 2016, he was arrested. On the 9 October 2017, he was awarded the Václav Havel Human Rights Prize at the Parliamentary Assembly of the Council of Europe. The announcement of the Prize, which honours human rights defenders in Europe and beyond, cited his work to uphold the independence of the judiciary in Turkey.

In January 2019, Arslan was sentenced to 10 years in prison for "participation to a terrorist organization". No violent action or call for violence was reported, the accusation being based on an anonymous denunciation and the presence of ByLock on his smartphone, an privacy application that Turkish prosecutors claim was widely used by members of the Gülen movement.

The trial was not fair according to the UN Special Rapporteur for the independence of judges and lawyers Diego García Sayán: “the conviction of Judge Arslan constitutes a severe and gross attack on the independence of the judiciary in Turkey, and in a democratic state under the rule of law an independent and impartial judiciary is a fundamental guarantee for society as a whole,” said the UN human rights expert.

Judge Arslan is released from prison on October 18, 2026.
