= Oslo Freedom Forum =

Annual human rights conference

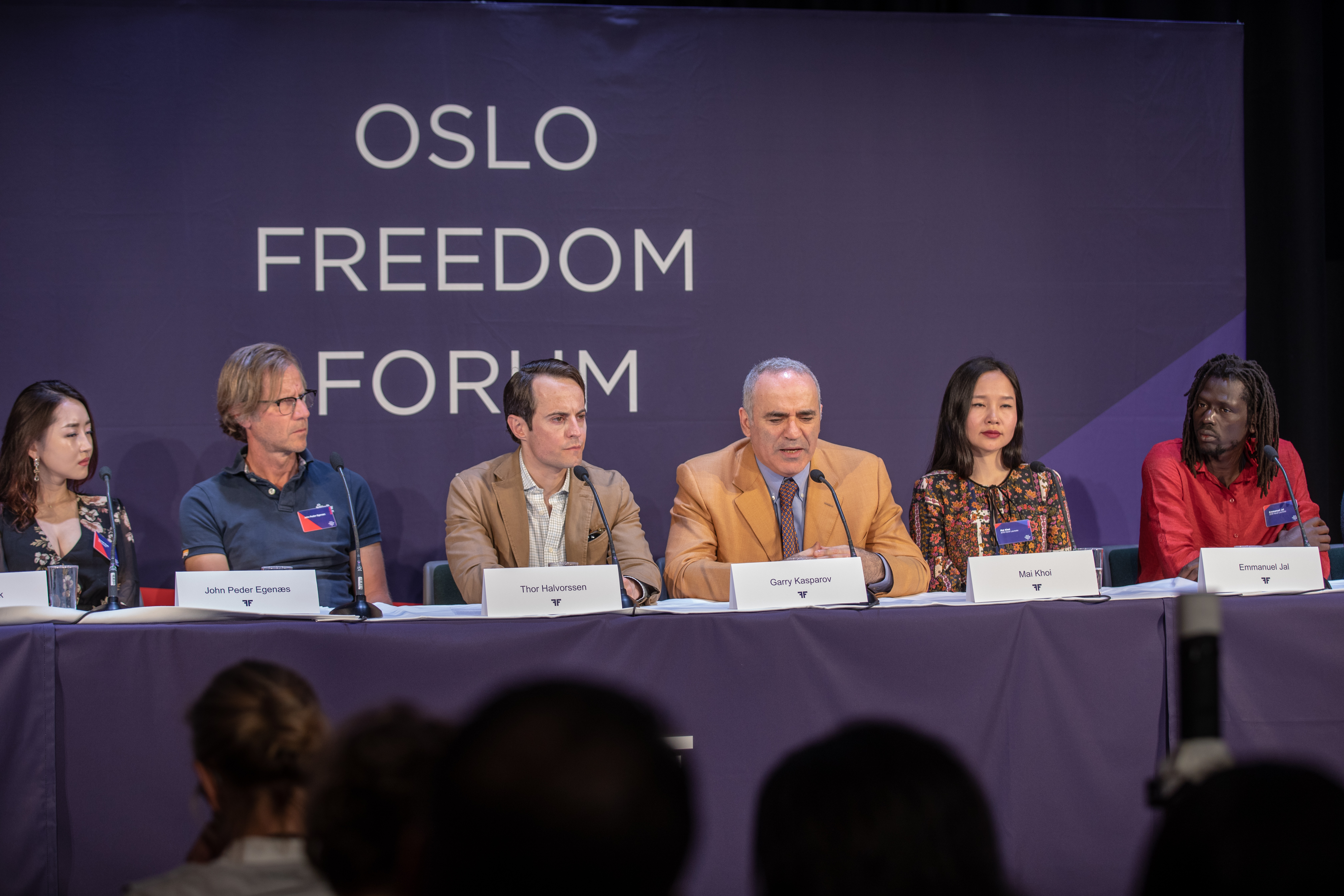
- From the press conference of the 2018 Oslo Freedom Forum.
- Founded: 2009 (Oslo, Norway)
- Organiser: Human Rights Foundation
- Website: www.oslofreedomforum.com

Oslo Freedom Forum (OFF) is a series of global human rights conferences run by the New York-based nonprofit Human Rights Foundation. OFF was founded in 2009 as a one-time event and has taken place annually since. The forum brings together international media and notable people including former heads of state, winners of the Nobel Peace Prize, and prisoners of conscience to exchange ideas about human rights. OFF focuses on classical individual human rights, such as freedom of expression and democracy.

The main OFF conference is held annually in central Oslo, Norway, while satellite events have been held in San Francisco, New York, Taiwan, and on college campuses in the United States. OFF talks are live-streamed and consist of lectures and panel discussions taking place in front of a live audience.

== History ==
The Oslo Freedom Forum was launched in 2009 to showcase global human rights initiatives. Founded by human rights advocate Thor Halvorssen, the forum quickly gained recognition and global media attention.

Since its inception in 2009, the Oslo Freedom Forum has been held annually in Oslo, Norway, with the exception of 2020 and 2021. In 2020, the event was held entirely online due to the COVID-19 pandemic. In 2021, it was temporarily relocated to Miami, Florida, adapting to travel restrictions while continuing to convene a global community.

The inaugural 2009 Oslo Freedom Forum, titled "The Nobility of the Human Spirit and the Power of Freedom", had an emphasis on the importance of literature in advancing the cause of freedom. Participants included Nobel Laureate Elie Wiesel, Czech playwright and politician Václav Havel, Kurdish rights advocate Leyla Zana, and Tibetan former political prisoner Palden Gyatso. The Wall Street Journal described OFF as "unlike any other human-rights conference [...] promoting basic rights in all nations at all times."

The Oslo Freedom Forum is funded by a large group of international donors. Recent sponsors include Atlas Network, the City of Oslo, Fritt Ord (organization), the John Templeton Foundation, the Norwegian Ministry of Foreign Affairs, PubKey, and the Reynolds Foundation. Past sponsors include the Brin Wojcicki Foundation and the Thiel Foundation. Other partners include Amnesty International Norway, Civita (think tank), the Norwegian organization for gender equality, integration and diversity LIM, the Norwegian Helsinki Committee, and Plan International.

=== List of Events ===
Year	Theme	Notable Speakers
2009	The Nobility of the Human Spirit and the Power of Freedom	Elie Wiesel, Václav Havel, Leyla Zana, Palden Gyatso
2010	From Tragedy to Triumph	Julian Assange, Lech Wałęsa, Yoani Sánchez
2011	Spark of Change	Ahmed Benchemsi, George Ayittey, Belisario Betancur
2012	Out of Darkness, Into Light	Irwin Cotler, Manal al-Sharif, Tutu Alicante
2013	Challenging Power	Lobsang Sangay, Srđa Popović, Mario Vargas Llosa
2014	Defeating Dictators	Bassem Youssef, Steven Pinker, Mikhail Khodorkovsky
2015	Living in Truth	Ji Seong-ho, Zineb El Rhazoui, Kimberly Motley
2016	Catalysts	Roya Mahboob, Thae Yong-ho, Vladimir Kara-Murza, Rosa María Payá, Wole Soyinka
2017	Defending Democracy	Anne Applebaum, Luis Almagro, Evan Mawarire, Raed Fares
2018	Rising	Fang Zheng, Omar Mohammed, Megha Rajagopalan, Mu Sochua, Antonio Ledezma
2019	Unite	Masih Alinejad, Denise Ho, Thae Yong-ho
2020	– Virtual Conference	Jack Dorsey, Sviatlana Tsikhanouskaya, Nathan Law
2021	Truth Ignited	Tania Bruguera, Steve Jurvetson, Berta Valle, Alexei Navalny (message from prison)
2022	Champion of Change	Oleksandra Matviichuk, Omar Alshogre, Evgenia Kara-Murza, Tawakkol Karman
2023	Celebrating Solidarity	Francis Fukuyama, Sanaa Seif, Abraham Jiménez Enoa, Nazanin Boniadi
2024	Reclaim Democracy	Carlos Chamorro, Paul Rusesabagina, Sébastien Lai
2025	Imagine	Vladimir Kara-Murza, Venancio Mondlane, Galina Timchenko

=== Format ===
The Forum includes panels and performances curated to highlight human rights defenders. Networking events, private round tables, and informal gatherings throughout the week encourage spontaneous collaboration.

OFF live streams its sessions on YouTube and maintains an online archive of talks, making the content accessible to a global audience.

== Participants and Notable Speakers ==
The Oslo Freedom Forum has featured a broad range of participants from across sectors and regions, including Nobel Peace Prize laureates, former heads of government, opposition leaders, academics, journalists, and artists. Speakers are typically invited based on their relevance to the forum’s themes of promoting human rights and challenging authoritarianism.

=== Notable guest speakers ===
- Elie Wiesel, Holocaust survivor and 1986 Nobel Peace Prize laureate, who appeared via video during the inaugural 2009 event.
- Lech Wałęsa, former president of Poland and Nobel Peace Prize laureate, known for leading the Solidarity movement.
- Mohamed Nasheed, former president of the Maldives and long-time advocate for democracy and climate action.
- Erna Solberg, who served as Norway’s prime minister from 2013 to 2021.
- Oleksandra Matviichuk, Ukrainian human rights lawyer and recipient of the 2022 Nobel Peace Prize on behalf of the Center for Civil Liberties.
- Alexei Navalny, Russian opposition politician, who delivered a recorded message from prison during the 2021 event.
- Paul Rusesabagina, Rwandan humanitarian figure and former political prisoner, spoke in 2024 following his release.
- Jack Dorsey, Twitter co-founder and CEO of Block, has participated in discussions on digital freedom and censorship.
- Maria Corina Machado, Venezuelan opposition leader, delivered a video message to the forum in 2024 amid her disqualification from elections and ongoing repression in Venezuela.
- Garry Kasparov, Russian chess grandmaster and chair of the Human Rights Foundation, a frequent speaker on authoritarianism and strategic resistance.
- Roya Mahboob, Afghan entrepreneur promoting women's access to technology and education.
- Vladimir Kara-Murza, Russian opposition politician and advocate for Magnitsky sanctions, who has addressed the forum multiple times.
- Denise Ho, Hong Kong singer and pro-democracy activist
- Mai Khoi, Vietnamese pop star turned dissident
- Ahmed Albasheer, Iraqi comedian and political satirist
- Audrey Tang, Taiwan’s Digital Minister
- Jason Hsu, Taiwanese lawmaker focused on open government
- Steven Jurvetson, American tech entrepreneur
- Lyn Alden, investor and expert on the intersection between technology and money
- Masih Alinejad, Iranian journalist advocating against mandatory hijab laws
- Srđa Popović, co-founder of the Serbian Otpor! movement
- Soraya Bahgat, Egyptian women’s rights advocate
- Carlos Chamorro, Nicaraguan investigative journalist in exile
- Pravit Rojanaphruk, Thai journalist and press freedom advocate
- Anastasia Lin, Canadian actress and human rights advocate
- Francis Fukuyama, political scientist and author of The End of History
- Timothy Snyder, Yale historian specializing in authoritarianism and Eastern Europe
- Anne Applebaum, journalist and historian focused on democratic backsliding
- Steven Levitsky, Harvard professor and co-author of How Democracies Die

== Awards ==
=== Václav Havel Prize ===
The Václav Havel International Prize for Creative Dissent was set up in 2012 to honor artists who creatively fight back against authoritarian regimes through art. The inaugural 2012 recipients included Aung San Suu Kyi.

2013 recipients were Syrian cartoonist Ali Ferzat, North Korean democracy activist Park Sang Hak, and Cuban civil society group Ladies in White—represented by their leader Berta Soler.

2023 recipients were Nicaraguan political cartoonist Pedro X. Molina; Ugandan novelist Kakwenza Rukirabashaija; and a third prize shared by conductor Yuriy Kerpatenko and illustrator Mariia Loniuk.

=== Thulani Maseko Justice Prize ===
The Thulani Maseko Justice Prize was established in 2023 by the Human Rights Foundation (HRF) in partnership with the Thulani Maseko Foundation to honor the legacy of the late Swazi human rights lawyer and democracy advocate, Thulani Maseko. The prize recognizes courageous human rights lawyers who risk, or have risked, their lives and freedom to defend the rule of law and democracy in countries ruled by authoritarian regimes.

Maseko was known for pioneering public interest, human rights, and constitutional litigation in Eswatini, Africa’s last absolute monarchy. He dedicated his career to ensuring that dissidents and ordinary citizens caught in the kingdom’s justice system had adequate legal representation and a fair trial. He was assassinated on 21 January 2023, just hours after King Mswati III publicly threatened deadly violence against those who opposed his absolute rule.

In 2024, the prize was awarded posthumously to Russian opposition leader Alexei Navalny. His widow, democracy advocate Yulia Navalnaya, accepted the award on his behalf at a ceremony during the Oslo Freedom Forum.

== One-day forums ==
In addition to its main gathering in Oslo, the Oslo Freedom Forum has steadily expanded its presence through satellite events in cities such as New York, San Francisco, and Taipei, as well as on university campuses, christened as the College Freedom Forum. The first one-day event took place on 19 September 2017 in New York City, parallel to the 72nd session of the United Nations General Assembly. The event took place at Alice Tully Hall, Lincoln Center, and was considered a "one-day" version of the event typically held in Oslo, later replicated in other cities. Speakers included among others former World Chess Champion and chairman of the Human Rights Foundation Garry Kasparov, Iranian dissident Marina Nemat, Russian democracy activist Vladimir Kara-Murza, Serbian political activist Srđa Popović and Venezuelan democracy activist Wuilly Arteaga. These additional forums help broaden the forum’s impact and allow new audiences to engage with its core mission. According to Fred Bauma, a Congolese human rights activist and 2019 HRF Freedom Fellow, "For activists, the Oslo Freedom Forum is the place to find new reasons to continue fighting for democracy, for liberty, for freedom, because you realize how many people are doing the work in their countries, and you feel really proud to be part of the community."

In 2019, the Forum held a one-day Forum in Taipei. Speakers included Denise Ho, Thae Yong-ho, and Thai education reformer and activist Netiwit Chotiphatphaisal. The most recent OFF Taiwan was held in 2023, showcasing speakers like Omar Alshogre, Joey Siu, and Pastor Kim Sungeun.

=== College Freedom Forum ===
The College Freedom Forum (CFF) launched in 2013 at Stanford University. CFF is an initiative designed to bring the OFF experience to university campuses, connecting students with global human rights advocates.

In 2012, Burmese pro-democracy leader Aung San Suu Kyi headlined the San Francisco Freedom Forum, which featured talks exploring various paths to freedom. Other speakers included: Saudi women's rights pioneer Manal al-Sharif; conflict psychologist Justine Hardy; Iranian author and former prisoner of conscience Marina Nemat; Slate editor and author William J. Dobson; drug policy reformer Ethan Nadelmann; Chinese scholar and former political prisoner Yang Jianli; Ghanaian economist George Ayittey; Moroccan journalist Ahmed Benchemsi; and Kazakhstani theater director Bolat Atabayev.

The Universidad Francisco Marroquín (UFM) in Guatemala has hosted the CFF multiple times since 2016, with the latest event taking place on March 7, 2025. It featured talks by Venezuelan activist Olga González, Hong Kong pro-democracy activist Joey Siu, and Cuban lawyer Laritza Diversent. In 2013, the first College Freedom Forum took place at Tufts University on 5 November. Speakers included Iranian author and former prisoner of conscience Marina Nemat; Moroccan journalist and media entrepreneur Ahmed Benchemsi; Equatoguinean human rights lawyer Tutu Alicante; president and CEO of Liberty in North Korea (LiNK) Hannah Song; and Egyptian journalist Abeer Allam.

In 2014, the College Freedom Forum took place at the University of Colorado Boulder on 11 March 2014. Speakers included Chinese civil rights activist Chen Guangcheng; Ugandan LGBT rights advocate Kasha Jacqueline; Bahraini human rights activist Maryam al-Khawaja; and North Korean defector and democracy advocate Park Sang Hak.

In 2015, the College Freedom Forum was held at Yale University on 26 March 2015. Speakers included North Korean defector Yeonmi Park; American journalist William Dobson; and Serbian expert on nonviolent resistance Srđa Popović.

In 2016, the San Francisco Freedom Forum took place at the Regency Center and included Rosa Maria Paya; Zineb El Rhazoui, Danilo Maldonado Machado, Lee Hyeon-seo, Roya Mahboob, Yulia Marushevska, Abdalaziz Alhamza, and Kimberley Motley.

In recent years, CFF has also been held at Augsburg University, University of Colorado, and Arizona State University.

== Reception ==
Coverage has highlighted OFF’s unique role as a platform for dissent. The New York Times characterized the forum as the place “where the world’s dissidents have their say,” underlining that it gives voice to activists from repressive regimes on a global stage. News and magazine profiles frequently remark on the forum’s compelling and unconventional nature. For example, BuzzFeed called OFF “an internationalist networking party where dissidents trade tips on overthrowing authoritarian regimes,” and Al Jazeera wrote that the event “gives the people who challenge repressive regimes a platform to speak.” Media pieces in outlets ranging from Vice to The Atlantic have detailed the personal stories of speakers and the forum’s atmosphere, often noting the mix of optimism and urgency at these gatherings. Early coverage in 2009 by The Wall Street Journal remarked that OFF was “unlike any other human-rights conference… the emphasis was on promoting basic rights in all nations at all times.” Over the years, regional newspapers and online media—from El País in Spain to Aftenposten in Norway—have similarly chronicled the forum’s sessions, reinforcing its reputation as a focal point for human rights discourse worldwide. Rebiya Kadeer, president of the World Uyghur Congress and a former political prisoner, highlighted the forum’s significance in "bringing all of the human rights defenders around the world to come to be together, to talk about human rights issues, to learn from one another, and to fight for human rights."

Academic commentary often highlights the forum’s function as a hub for exchanging strategies of nonviolent resistance and democracy promotion. Researchers note that the forum provides an opportunity for activists and thinkers to share knowledge across borders. Indeed, the 2023 study concluded that OFF’s program serves as “an intellectual hub” where attendees learn ways to foster democratic values, build international solidarity, and devise “practical solutions” to challenges facing civil society. Beyond formal scholarship, policy analysts have reflected on OFF’s significance in the context of a changing human rights landscape. Some analyses acknowledge a sense of urgency or even frustration among participants, given global democratic backsliding. For instance, a 2022 commentary in Tablet magazine remarked that even optimistic activists at OFF struggled with “a sense of drift and impotence” in the face of worldwide authoritarian resurgence. Academic discussions therefore often cite the Oslo Freedom Forum as an innovative model for how non-governmental actors mobilize attention to human rights causes and empower pro-democracy movements in an increasingly interconnected world.

OFF has elicited a range of reactions from governments, from open support by democracies to hostility from authoritarian regimes. In Norway – the forum’s host country – OFF earned early backing from official institutions. The City of Oslo and Norway’s Ministry of Foreign Affairs are listed as supporters of the conference since 2012, and Norwegian leaders have participated in the event ever since. Notably, Prime Minister Erna Solberg of Norway addressed the forum in 2017, and Foreign Minister Espen Barth Eide joined a discussion on the Gaza genocide in 2024, . Governments of other democracies have also taken note. Former U.S. President Bill Clinton described the forum as “a unique gathering of the best minds, bravest hearts, and strongest pillars of the human rights community,” praising the way it brings together voices that matter.

By contrast, authoritarian governments have often reacted with negatively. Many speakers at OFF have suffered retaliation or character assassination by the regimes they oppose. Although these regimes rarely acknowledge the forum directly, their state-controlled media frequently attempt to discredit OFF participants, branding them as enemies of the state or puppets of foreign powers. Some governments have even gone so far as to block activists from traveling to Oslo.

Among human rights activist, the Oslo Freedom Forum described as an influential forum. It has become a regular event for many leading voices in civil society. From Norway alone, organizations such as Amnesty Norway, the Helsinki Committee, Plan Norway, Fritt Ord, and Civita have thrown their support behind the forum. The forum is known also for bringing attention to human rights issues. Václav Havel lent his name and presence to the forum’s launch in 2009. Over the years, many participants have spoken of the forum as a turning point in their advocacy, leading to funding, partnerships, and media visibility.

== See also ==
- Human Rights Foundation
- Freedom of expression
- Nonviolent resistance
- Political prisoner
- Dissident
- Democracy promotion
- Garry Kasparov
- Václav Havel
