= Naji al Jerf =

Syrian journalist

- Born: ca. 1977; Salamiyah, Syria
- Died: 27 December 2015; Gaziantep, Turkey
- Cause of death: Gunshot
- Body discovered: Gaziantep, Turkey
- Resting place: Yeşilkent Şehitlik cemetery, Turkey
- Education: Tishreen University
- Occupation: Journalist/filmmaker
- Employer: Hentah
- Organization: Raqqa Is Being Slaughtered Silently
- Title: Uncle
- Spouse: Boshra Kashmar
- Children: 2 girls

Naji al Jerf (Arabic: ناجي الجرف) (1977 – 27 December 2015), also known as "Uncle", was a Syrian journalist, filmmaker, editor and both a co-founder and filmmaker for the organization Raqqa Is Being Slaughtered Silently in Gaziantep, Turkey. He was known for his reporting about ISIS and uncovering their secrets before he was assassinated.

== Personal life ==
Al Jerf was born in Salamiyah, Syria, and was from an Ismaeli background, a branch of Shia Islam. He graduated with a bachelor's degree in philosophy from Tishreen University.

He was married to Boshra Kashmar, a poet; they had two daughters. While in Homs, his wife, gave birth to their first daughter, whom they named Emesa, after Hom's ancient Greek title.

He was known by many as 'Uncle' because of his mentoring and training of many young people in the revolutionary movement.

He is buried at Yeşilkent cemetery.

== Career ==
Al Jerf was a journalist, filmmaker, and editor. He worked as an Al Jazeera documentary producer in Damascus until the beginning of the civil war. He also worked as editor-in-chief of Hentah, a Syrian magazine that reports on the "daily lives of Syrian citizens." It produced local news and untold stories in Salamiyah and elsewhere. Al Jerf expanded Hentah magazine, increasing reach and continuing to publish articles about prisoners and martyrs, refugees, Kurds, Palestinians, Free Syrian Army, ISIS, and broader questions regarding Syria and the revolution. He also founded Hentawi magazine, a version geared towards 9-to-15 year-old readers.

== Raqqa is Being Slaughtered Silently ==
Naji Al Jerf was an activist throughout Syrian civil war. Early on, he was active in organizing in his community founding Salamiyah City Media Office and various coordination committees in Salamiyah, Syria, as well as serving as a liaison between them.

Later, Naji Al Jerf became one of the co-founders of Raqqa Is Being Slaughtered Silently and a spokesperson for the organization. The organization is a group exposing human rights abuses in the Syrian capital of ISIS. While with the group, he made a documentary about ISIS's killing of media activists and a health worker in Aleppo. The documentary was also broadcast by Al Arabiya channel, which attracted more than 12 million viewers.

== Assassination attempts ==
Naji al-Jerf escaped several assassination attempts before his death. Turkish security services foiled two, one of them by defusing an explosive under his car.

== Death ==
Gaziantep, Turkey is located on the border near Syria and shown relative to Syria's largest city Aleppo and its capital city Damascus.

Al Jerf was killed in Gaziantep, Turkey, where he had been since leaving Syria in 2012 and was documenting atrocities performed by ISIL and the Syrian Government. Before Al Jerf was shot, he had been receiving death threats from ISIS over fake Facebook accounts. His death happened during the day around 3:20 p.m. when he was at a restaurant to order some food for his daughters. While he was waiting outside a restaurant, in downtown Gaziantep, a white car drove by and a masked man with a silencer shot Al Jerf. He was taken to the Aralık State Hospital where he later died.

Daesh (ISIL) claimed responsibility for the murder that very night. This organization also claimed responsibility for the murder of two of his colleagues, beheaded in early November 2015 in Şanliurfa, Turkey.

=== Trial ===
Yusuf Hamed Eshverihi, a member of ISIL was convicted on 9 June 2017 after three other suspects were acquitted based on a lack of evidence. The trial was behind closed doors, al Jerf's family was not represented in the trial by a lawyer, relative, or representative of any Syrian organization. They received updates on the trial through media reports, because they were not given direct access to the trial. He has been sentenced to two life sentences for the murder of al Jerf and for "trying to overthrow the constitutional order" by joining the Islamic State. In addition, he was sentenced to another five years and five months in jail on charges of the “possession of explosive material” and the “possession of an illegal gun”.

== Impact ==
As stated above Naji Al Jerf was one of the co-founders of Raqqa Is Being Slaughtered Silently and a spokesperson for the organization. He helped fund and deliver aid to the intentionally displaced. He also trained others with making documentaries.

== Reactions ==
Irina Bokova, director-general of UNESCO, said, "I trust that the investigation of the murder of Naji Jerf will bear fruit and that those responsible for this crime will face trial."

A spokesperson for the Committee to Protect Journalists said, "We call on Turkish authorities to bring the killers of Naji Jerf to justice swiftly and transparently, and to step up measures to protect all Syrian journalists on Turkish soil."

After his death, people started sharing the documentary footage about ISIS that he had original posted on YouTube. The footage spread through other social media along with statements reacting to his work.

Al Jerf was liked by many Syrian opposition activists. Hasan, Al Jerf's friend, said "I do expect and hope that the Turkish authorities will find the killer. If not, we won't forget him and this case will not be forgotten." His death has sent chills through the Syrian community of activists living in Gaziantep.

His wife, Boshra Kashmar, said his assassination was a nightmare, and she wakes up every morning looking for him, standing there, and joking and laughing.

== Awards ==
The film that the Raqqa Is Being Slaughtered Silently group made and directed by Naji won a committee to protect journalists’ international press freedom award in November 2015.

== Works ==
- Vilayah Haleb (also known as Aleppo Under Daesh) The documentary was posted on YouTube, where it had over 75,000 views as of 31 December 2015.

== See also ==
- List of journalists killed during the Syrian Civil War
