= Girifna =

Sudanese non-violent resistance movement

- Formation: October, 2009
- Headquarters: Khartoum
- university students: Nagi Musa, Seraj Omer and Akram Ahmed
- Award: Vaclav Havel Price for Creative Dissent

Girifna is a Sudanese movement that is opposed to "war, corruption, dictatorship, injustice, and discrimination against minorities." It was founded by university students in October 2009. The word girifna means 'we are fed up' in Arabic.

Freedom House describes Girifna as a youth-run non-violent resistance movement. Peace Monitor hails the movement as a non-violent organization actively working to foster peace. "They are working for peace, equality and trying to build a broader understanding between people that have been engaged in conflict against each other for such a long time."

== Founding ==
The group was established in October 2009. It began as a campaign to defeat the ruling National Congress Party (NCP) in the 2010 national elections, or, according to at least one source, as a voter-registration movement in that same year's elections. Girifna was founded two days before the voter-registration process began. It was the country's first multi-party election in almost a quarter-century, and the founders of Girifna saw it "as an opportunity for peaceful change."

According to one source, Girifna has three co-founders: Nagi Musa, Seraj Omer, and Akram Ahmed.

Ghazi Mohammed Abuzied, a chemical engineering student, "joined Girifna on Facebook before the elections and offered to volunteer his time," according to The Washington Post. He now "coordinates the movement's activities in Khartoum, arranging when volunteers go to markets and bus stations to speak and hand out leaflets." Hisham Haj Omar, a Sudanese living in New York, helped build Girifna's website.

== Objectives ==
Girifna states that it does not hold a specific political agenda, but is fighting for democracy and political freedom in the Sudan. While the organization does not support any one particular party of the opposition, it firmly opposes the ruling NCP party. Girifna has called for the Sudanese people to vote out the NCP regime from power.

After the 2010 elections, Girifna shifted its objective; its present goal is to overthrow the ruling NCP through non-violent resistance and replace it with a "democratic nation-state." "In the aftermath of the elections," the Open Democracy website has stated, "Girifna continued to push forward and organize for regime change." One member of the group has said that "the [NCP's] ideology is the root cause of all [our] problems. We are a country of multiple cultures, multiple religions, multiple languages. We need to be governed in a way that accepts this diversity. These people are unable to accept diversity. Their ideology is imposing a supremacy of Arabism, Islamism…[it's] an ideology of discrimination, of racism, and of manipulating religion to marginalize a lot of people in Sudan."

== Leaders ==
One source describes Girifna as "a very modern organization" that has "no leader, only members" who have no office headquarters but instead "gather in each other's houses." According to this source, these members "are not anti-government; they are pro-change. They are not demanding power; they are demanding justice and their basic human rights. Girifna started taking action by handing out messages on the streets. The first message was simply 'know your rights!' The second was to unite and that they had to include women in the political process."

== Membership ==
The Girifna movement is open to all Sudanese citizens, and the exact number of members is difficult to determine. According to a 2010 article in The Washington Post, Girifna had about 5,000 volunteers in Sudan; an article published during the same year in The Globe and Mail placed the number of supporters at nearly 18,000. As of 2010, Girifna had more than 7,000 members on its Facebook page.

The organization itself characterizes its membership as "diverse" and "comprised of a wide range of ages, and ethnic and religious backgrounds." Most of its members are reportedly youth activists, primarily from central Sudan, and some sources identify it as "student-led." The group welcomes members regardless of political beliefs and it purportedly has members belonging to "all the major political parties in the country."

== Headquarters ==
Girifna's headquarters are located in Khartoum, where the movement is most active, as well as in Khartoum Bahri and Omdurman. It has also been active in the cities of Madani, Algadarif, Al Jazeera, Atbara, Al Obied, Meroe, Dongola, and Nyala.

== Activities ==
The organization seeks to educate the Sudanese public, especially young people, about their rights and about the "methodologies of non-violent resistance movements." It has held educational campaigns, public forums on economic and political issues, and art exhibitions, and its events "have addressed such issues as corruption, economic disparity and poverty, the limitation of political freedoms, and emphasized citizen participation through voter registration and voter education."

Members of the group "engage in mukhatabat (street talks)... and distribute leaflets challenging the NCP in marketplaces, universities, schools, and on public transportation"; they have also reportedly held demonstrations and "flash mobilizations" on the streets in opposition to the ruling regime. Girifna encourages volunteers to "conduct informal informational activities in their communities." The organization "uses a range of different methods to mobilise opinion," one source has stated. "They have tried everything from using humour through a 'soap ad commercial' where al-Bashirs picture is washed from a dirty shirt, to training people how to demonstrate and protest."

In 2015, Girifna was awarded the Václav Havel Prize for Creative Dissent.

=== Media ===
Girifna publishes a magazine, operates a radio station (Radio Girifna), has an online magazine and Facebook page, and also prints newsletters and brochures. It also seeks to communicate with rural audiences via poems, songs, music videos, advertisements, and audio interviews. Girifna has also posted videos on YouTube.

=== Funding ===
Girifna says that it does not accept donations from foreign governments or international agencies. It does, however, take money from political parties and various Sudanese individuals both in the country and in the diaspora.

== Challenges ==
Girifna members have reportedly been subject to harassment by Sudanese security forces, and have been described as operating "in an extremely restrictive and dangerous environment." Freedom House has stated that Girifna is targeted by Sudan's National Intelligence and Security Service (NISS) and that its members have been subjected to detention, torture, beatings, stabbings, sexual harassment, rape, abductions, arrests, imprisonment, arbitrary detention, and torture.

On July 5, 2010, three Girifna members were arrested while distributing a pamphlet in Khartoum North. They were charged with inciting violence against the state and threatening public safety and "were beaten and coerced into agreeing to spy on Girifna for the government."

Girifna co-founder Rudwan Dawod, who is a U.S. resident, was arrested on July 3, 2012, for participating in peaceful protests. Detained for six weeks, he was charged with terrorism, which is punishable by death. During his detention he was tortured, beaten, subjected to sleep deprivation, and threatened with rape. He was again taken into custody and detained from August 13 to August 16, 2012.

"The government's harsh crackdown on Girifna's peaceful organizing activities is a testament to the potential power of youth activism," Olivia Bueno, associate director of the International Refugee Rights Initiative, has said.
