= Mai Khôi =

Vietnamese musician, artist, and political activist (born 1983)

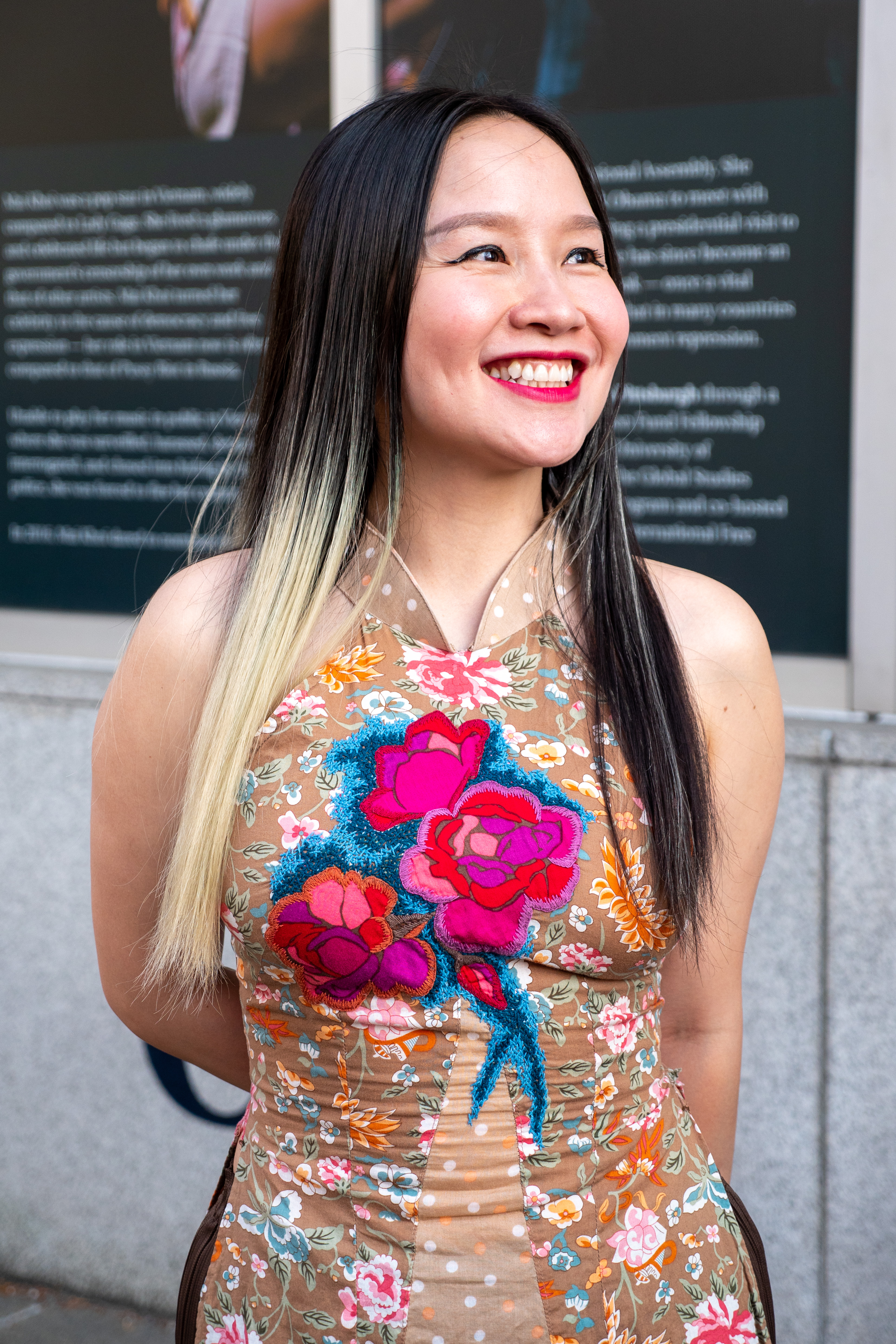
- Khôi in 2021
- Born: Đỗ Nguyễn Mai Khôi; 11 December 1983 (age 42); Cam Ranh, Khánh Hòa, Vietnam
- Occupations: Musician; songwriter; political activist
- Years active: 2004–present
- Spouses: Benjamin Swanton (m. 2013; div. 2024) Mark Micchelli (m. 2025)
- Awards: 2010 Album of the Year (Vietnam Television); 2018 Václav Havel Prize for Creative Dissent; 2022 Roosevelt Four Freedoms Award for Freedom of Speech
- Musical career
- Genre: Pop
- Instruments: Vocals; guitar
- Website: mai-khoi.com

Đỗ Nguyễn Mai Khôi (born 1983), known professionally as Mai Khoi, is a Vietnamese singer, artist, and political activist. Described as the "Lady Gaga of Vietnam" and also compared to Russian artist-activists Pussy Riot, she began as an award-winning pop singer before her outspoken criticism of the Government of Vietnam's censorship and lack of democracy led to government persecution and restrictions on her freedom of speech. Khôi has also criticised Google and Facebook for cooperating with internet censorship in Vietnam. In 2018, she received the Václav Havel Prize for Creative Dissent in recognition of her democracy activism, and in 2021, she was awarded the Four Freedoms Award.

== Early life and education ==
Đỗ Nguyễn Mai Khôi was born in 1983 in Cam Ranh, Vietnam.

Her interest in music began in childhood, and she learned to play guitar from her father, who taught music, at eight years of age, going on to play with him at weddings from the age of twelve. She later attended a music school in Ho Chi Minh City for three years but left without graduating, instead playing in pubs and bars around the city.

== Musical career ==
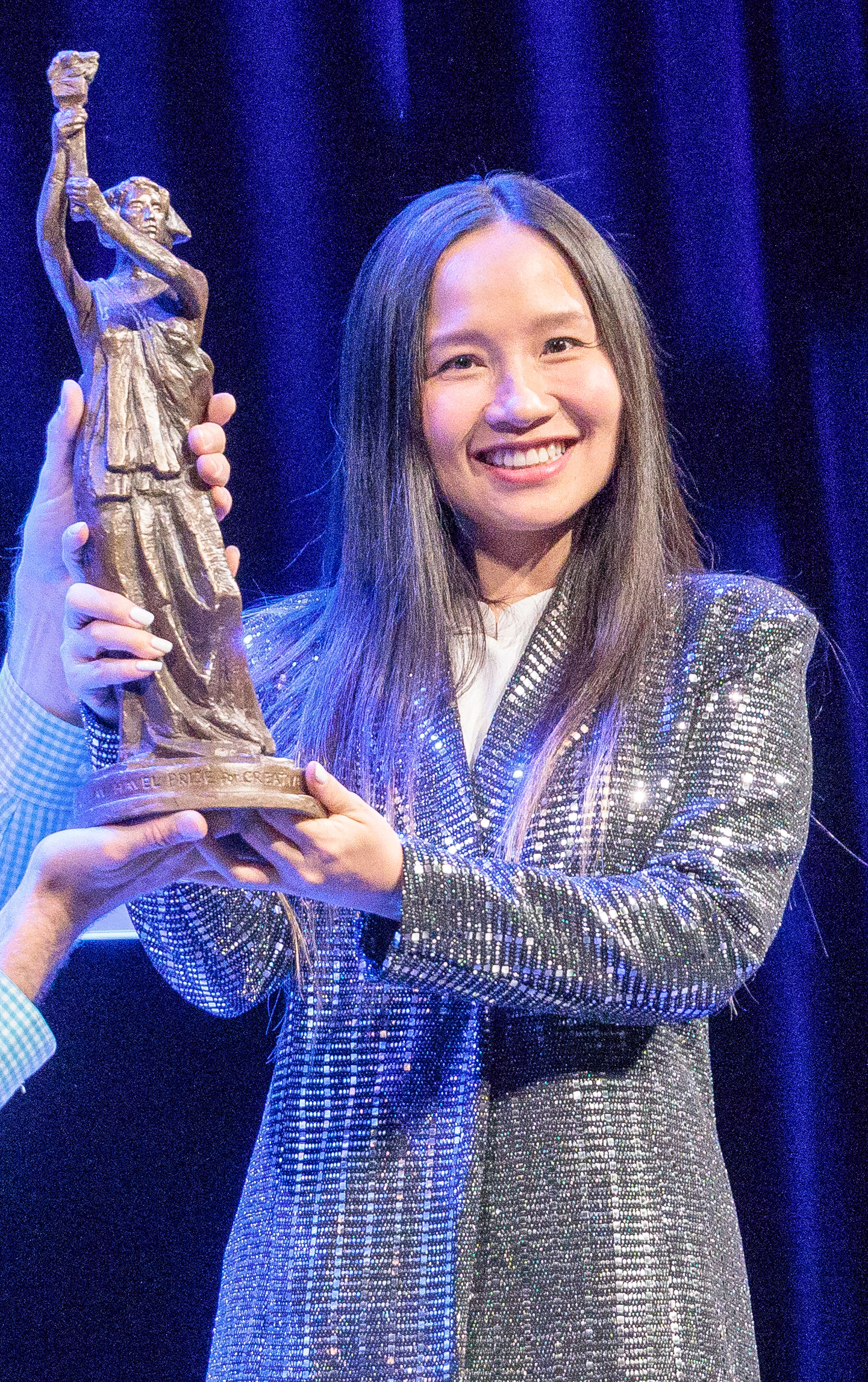
Mai Khôi at the 2018 Oslo Freedom Forum

In 2010, Khôi achieved national fame after winning the Vietnam Television Album of the Year award, and she used her national platform to agitate for better women's rights and LGBT rights in her country. For example, she spoke against Đàm Vĩnh Hưng's suggestion that domestic violence was "acceptable" against women who were "too aggressive" and criticised social acceptance of violence against women.

Khôi attracted controversy for shaving half of her head into the letters "VN" to represent "Vietnam" after her winning song of the same name. She was criticised in Vietnamese state media for her expressed preference not to have children as well as her boundary-pushing outfits and songs such as "Selfie Orgasm", which garnered criticism for nudity and coarse language in the music video. After she began arguing in favour of greater creative freedom and stopped submitting her song lyrics to censors, the Vietnamese government banned her performances in the country, with police raiding her concerts.

Khôi has toured overseas, including in the United States, Australia, Europe, Mexico, and Cuba.

Following government crackdown on her music career, Khôi moved her music underground and formed the group Mai Khoi and the Dissidents

In exile in Pittsburgh, US, Khôi began working on a project titled Bad Activist, a multimedia autobiographical stage show that combines storytelling and performance.

== Political activism ==
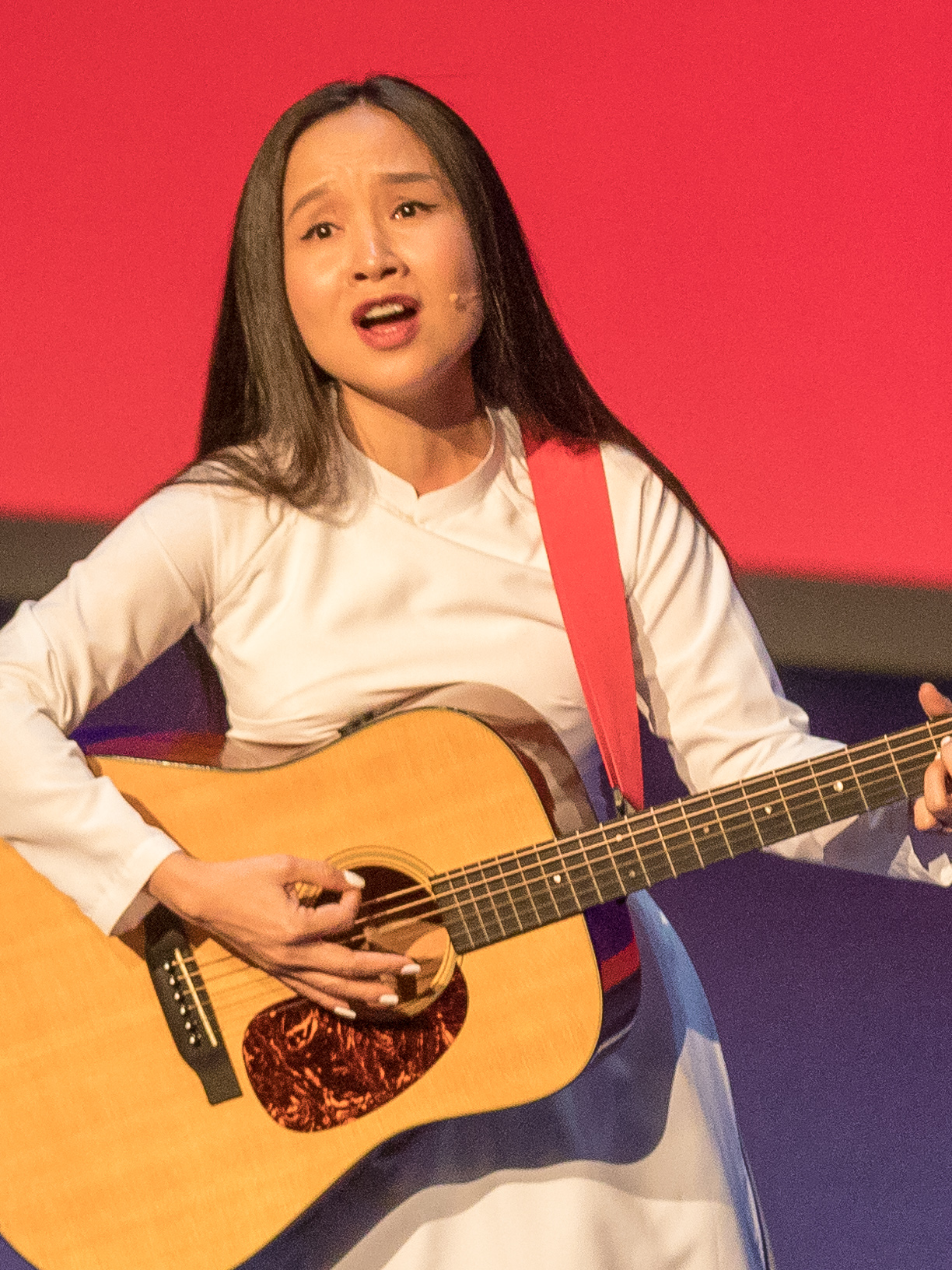
Khôi performing at the 2018 Oslo Freedom Forum in the Det Norske Teatret

In 2016, Khôi took part in environmental protests against Formosa Ha Tinh Steel Corporation following the marine life disaster caused by its waste dumping. She also applied to run as an independent for a seat in the National Assembly of Vietnam but was disqualified from participating by the Vietnamese Fatherland Front. Following her attempt to enter politics, she was subject to increased official persecution, including police raids of her concerts and landlords being pressured by authorities to evict her and her husband from their home. After 2017, she leased a flat under a friend's name in a secret location in Hanoi.

Khôi has criticised Facebook for cooperating with internet censorship requirements imposed by the Vietnamese government, stating it was damaging one of the last refuges for freedom of expression in the repressive state. The platform's policies also prevented her live-streaming music due to the risk of instant arrest.

Khôi was one of the political dissidents that U.S. president Barack Obama met with on his visit to the country in 2016. She had gone into hiding before the meeting to avoid being detained and prevented from attending. The day after the meeting, she was visited by four police officers who intimidated her.

When Obama's successor, Donald Trump, visited the country in 2017, Khôi held up a banner reading "~~Peace~~Piss on you Trump" in protest of his alleged racism and supposed failure to promote human rights. The next day, she and her husband were evicted from their Hanoi apartment following a visit by government agents.

In 2018, Amnesty International named Khôi one of that year's "12 inspiring human rights activists to follow". Later that year, she was detained for eight hours at Nội Bài International Airport in Hanoi after returning from a European tour, with all copies of her new album Dissent in her possession confiscated by the authorities.

== Personal life ==
Khôi married her Australian partner, Benjamin Swanton, in 2013.

They lived in Hanoi until she fled to the U.S. to escape prosecution in November 2020, becoming a scholar in residence at the University of Pittsburgh's Scholars at Risk program. Khôi lives in a residence provided by the Pittsburgh-based nonprofit City of Asylum and serves on the international advisory board of the International Free Expression Project, another Pittsburgh-based nonprofit. The two nonprofits also co-sponsored Khôi for an Artist Protection Fund fellowship in residence at the University of Pittsburgh.

== Discography ==
Solo

- Mai-Khoi (2004)
- Mai-Khoi Sings Quoc-Bao (2008)
- Mot Ngay Moi (2010)
- Hay Hoa Hong (2010)
- Made in Mai Khoi (2010)
- Hat Le Cat Trong Ly (2010)
- Hoa Dal (2010)
- Mai Khoi Hay Hoa Hong (2011)
- Mot Ngay Moi (2011)
- Căn nhà nhỏ (2018)
- Khôi (2018)

Mai Khoi and the Dissidents / Mai Khôi Chem Gio

- Dissent (2018)
