= Václav Havel Prize for Creative Dissent =

American award

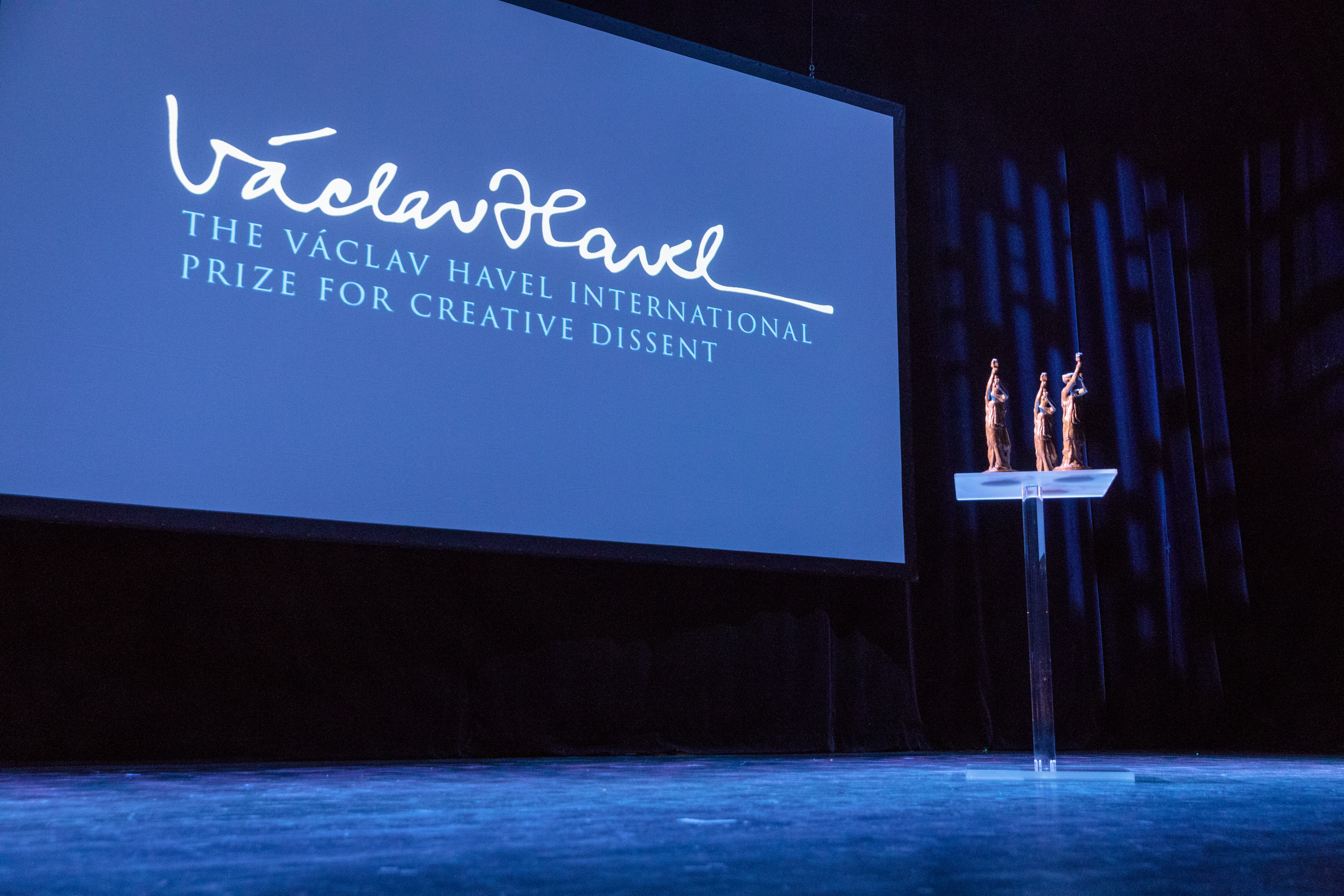
Václav Havel Prize Award Ceremony in 2018

Václav Havel Prize for Creative Dissent is an award established in 2012 by the New York City-based Human Rights Foundation (HRF). According to HRF President Thor Halvorssen, the prize recognizes individuals "who engage in creative dissent, exhibiting courage and creativity to challenge injustice and live in truth".

Named in honor of Czech dissident playwright and politician Václav Havel, who died in December 2011, the award was founded with the help of his widow, Dagmar Havlová. Google co-founder Sergei Brin and PayPal co-founder Peter Thiel provided part of the prize's funding.

== Recipients ==
Year	Laureates	Country/Ethnicity	Description	Notes
2012	Ai Weiwei	China	Dissident	Presented on 9 May in Oslo, Norway by the Oslo Freedom Forum. After al-Sharif's speech was viewed hundreds of thousands of times on YouTube, she lost her job as an Internet security consultant at Saudi Aramco, the national oil company of Saudi Arabia. Presenter Garry Kasparov stated that the three awardees had "shown not only courage, but passion and humor, that exposes the inhumanity of dictatorship".
2012	Aung San Suu Kyi	Myanmar	Democracy activist	Presented on 9 May in Oslo, Norway by the Oslo Freedom Forum. After al-Sharif's speech was viewed hundreds of thousands of times on YouTube, she lost her job as an Internet security consultant at Saudi Aramco, the national oil company of Saudi Arabia. Presenter Garry Kasparov stated that the three awardees had "shown not only courage, but passion and humor, that exposes the inhumanity of dictatorship".
2012	Manal al-Sharif	Saudi Arabia	Women's rights activist	Presented on 9 May in Oslo, Norway by the Oslo Freedom Forum. After al-Sharif's speech was viewed hundreds of thousands of times on YouTube, she lost her job as an Internet security consultant at Saudi Aramco, the national oil company of Saudi Arabia. Presenter Garry Kasparov stated that the three awardees had "shown not only courage, but passion and humor, that exposes the inhumanity of dictatorship".
2013	Ali Farzat	Syria	Cartoonist	Presented on 15 May by the Oslo Freedom Forum. Berta Soler, leader of the Ladies in White, received the award on her first journey outside of her native Cuba, while also receiving the Sakharov Prize for Freedom of Thought.
2013	Park Sang-hak	North Korea	Democracy activist	Presented on 15 May by the Oslo Freedom Forum. Berta Soler, leader of the Ladies in White, received the award on her first journey outside of her native Cuba, while also receiving the Sakharov Prize for Freedom of Thought.
2013	Ladies in White	Cuba	Civil society group	Presented on 15 May by the Oslo Freedom Forum. Berta Soler, leader of the Ladies in White, received the award on her first journey outside of her native Cuba, while also receiving the Sakharov Prize for Freedom of Thought.
2014	Erdem Gunduz	Turkey	Protester and performance artist	
2014	Pussy Riot	Russia	Punk rock protest group	
2014	Dhondup Wangchen	Tibet	Documentary filmmaker	
2015	Girifna	Sudan	nonviolent resistance movement	
2015	Sakdiyah Ma'ruf	Indonesia	Stand-up comedian	
2015	El Sexto	Cuba	Graffiti artist and activist	
2016	Atena Farghadani	Iran	Cartoonist	Pavlensky's prize was withdrawn by the Human Rights Foundation after he announced his intention to dedicate the award and prize money to the "Primorsky Partisans," a group of six then-teenagers in the Russian Far East who in 2010 declared a "guerrilla war" on police to "protest corruption and lawlessness and were given lengthy prison sentences for the murder of three officers, robbery, and theft". In a letter, the Foundation said that the revocation was "unfortunate and unprecedented" and that those who have "advocated the use of violence as a valid method to fight government oppression" are barred from receiving the award.
2016	Petr Pavlensky	Russia	Performance artist	
2016	Umida Akhmedova	Uzbekistan	Photojournalist	
2017	Silvanos Mudzvova	Zimbabwe	Artist and activist	Presented on 24 May by the Oslo Freedom Forum.
2017	Ayat Al-Qurmezi	Bahrain	Poet and activist	Presented on 24 May by the Oslo Freedom Forum.
2017	El Chigüire Bipolar	Venezuela	Satirical website	Presented on 24 May by the Oslo Freedom Forum.
2018	Emmanuel Jal	Canada	Activist	Presented on 30 May by the Oslo Freedom Forum.
2018	Belarus Free Theatre	Belarus	Theater group	Presented on 30 May by the Oslo Freedom Forum.
2018	Mai Khôi	Vietnam	Musician	Presented on 30 May by the Oslo Freedom Forum.
2019	Rap Against Dictatorship	Thailand	Rappers	Presented on 29 May at the Oslo Freedom Forum.
2019	Rayma Suprani	Venezuela	Cartoonist	Presented on 29 May at the Oslo Freedom Forum.
2019	Ramy Essam	Egypt	Musician	Presented on 29 May at the Oslo Freedom Forum.
2020	Badiucao	China	Artist	Presented online on 25 September during the Virtual Oslo Freedom Forum.
2020	Omar Abdulaziz	Saudi Arabia	Vlogger	Presented online on 25 September during the Virtual Oslo Freedom Forum.
2020	Kizito Mihigo	Rwanda	Gospel Singer	Presented online on 25 September during the Virtual Oslo Freedom Forum.
2022	Enes Kanter Freedom	United States	Basketball player and human rights advocate	Enes Kanter Freedom received the prize for raising awareness of the Chinese Communist Party (CCP)’s human rights abuses, PaykanArtCar for inspiring diaspora Iranian artists to advocate for human rights in Iran, and Marina Ovsyannikova for staging a protest against the Russian invasion of Ukraine during a news broadcast of Russian state TV. Presented on 25 May by the Oslo Freedom Forum.
2022	PaykanArtCar	Iran	Artist project	Enes Kanter Freedom received the prize for raising awareness of the Chinese Communist Party (CCP)’s human rights abuses, PaykanArtCar for inspiring diaspora Iranian artists to advocate for human rights in Iran, and Marina Ovsyannikova for staging a protest against the Russian invasion of Ukraine during a news broadcast of Russian state TV. Presented on 25 May by the Oslo Freedom Forum.
2022	Marina Ovsyannikova	Ukrainian-born, Russia	Journalist	Enes Kanter Freedom received the prize for raising awareness of the Chinese Communist Party (CCP)’s human rights abuses, PaykanArtCar for inspiring diaspora Iranian artists to advocate for human rights in Iran, and Marina Ovsyannikova for staging a protest against the Russian invasion of Ukraine during a news broadcast of Russian state TV. Presented on 25 May by the Oslo Freedom Forum.
2024	Toomaj Salehi	Iran	Rapper	Presented on 22 May by the Oslo Freedom Forum.
2024	Tahir Hamut Izgil	Uyghurs(Chinese dissidents)	Poet filmmaker and activist	Presented on 22 May by the Oslo Freedom Forum.
2024	Gabriela Montero	Venezuela	Pianist	Presented on 22 May by the Oslo Freedom Forum.
2025	Luis Manuel Otero Alcántara	Cuba	Artist and pro-democracy activist	Presented at the 2025 Oslo Freedom Forum.
2025	Azza Abo Rebieh	Syria	Activist and artist	Presented at the 2025 Oslo Freedom Forum.
2025	Alexandra Skochilenko.	Russia	Artist, poet, and musician	Presented at the 2025 Oslo Freedom Forum.

== See also ==
- Václav Havel Award for Human Rights
