= Mosul Eye =

Iraqi news blog

- Website type: Blog
- Available in: English
- Creator: Omar Mohammed
- Website: mosuleye.wordpress.com
- Registration: None
- Launched: June 2014
- Current status: Active

Mosul Eye (Arabic: عين الموصل) is a news blog created and maintained by historian and citizen journalist Omar Mohammed who graduated from Mosul University. For more than two years, Mohammed used the blog to report conditions and events in the Iraqi city of Mosul during the occupation of the Islamic State of Iraq and the Levant (ISIL). During this time, Mosul Eye was an anonymous blog.

Mosul was liberated on July 10, 2017, after a battle that lasted for 9 months and 4 days. The blog is frequently cited as one of the few reliable sources documenting life under ISIL rule and has been called a critical source of information for journalists and scholars. Though anonymous, the blogger and his content were judged to be authentic by experts. On 7 December 2017, the blogger revealed his identity as Omar Mohammed. In other venues, Mohammed wrote under the pseudonyms Mouris Milton and Ibn al-Athir al-Mawsilli.

== History ==
Mosul Eye began on Facebook shortly after the ISIL invasion with the goal of keeping the world updated on what was happening in the city. The content is typically written in English and often Arabic, and is mirrored to WordPress.com and X (previously known as Twitter) in case the blogger loses access to the Facebook page or it is censored.

== Content ==
Mohammed wrote extensively about ISIL's control of Mosul. One of his first posts contained this report:

ISIS fighters are carrying laptops which contain a database of civil and military records. They are launching checkpoints around the city, asking for people's IDs, looking for their 'wanted' people.

He described not only the destruction of ancient buildings and burning of library books, but frequent executions and torture by ISIL militants, including beheadings, amputations, public floggings, the stoning of women and murder of homosexuals. In September 2015, Mosul Eye reported details on 455 executions, including the location, ethnicity and religion of the victims. The blogger also publishes information on ISIL members, including photographs of ten ISIL fighters, calling them "primary suspects" and "wanted for committing war crimes against the people of Mosul." The blogger also reports on coalition airstrikes against ISIL targets in the city.

In addition to ISIL activities, he reported episodes of resistance against the regime in Mosul. Mosul Eye quotes residents and discusses their attitudes toward the militant group, writing in February 2015, "Nowadays, people talk openly in the market about [ISIL] and its cruelty." The blog has also posted details about ISIL's struggles, such as the fighters going three months without a salary, and that there were foreign fighters as young as 13 years old among their ranks.

According to a profile done by Al-Fanar Media, Mosul Eye "takes a scientific approach to information, trying to gather, categorize and verify data. It also offers sociological and economic analysis, as when it explains how the Islamic State has drawn many of its members and support from a downtrodden rural tribe based outside Mosul; or how corruption, sectarianism and the American policy of de-Baathification, hollowed out the Iraqi army, leaving it incapable of standing up to the Islamic State."

=== Battle of Mosul ===
Mosul Eye had posted several updates on the preparations inside the city for the battle to liberate the city that began in October 2016, including ISIL activity and positions, and fears of a looming food crisis. On 2 November, the day after Iraqi Special Operations Forces finally entered the city, he tweeted urgently to coalition forces to warn them that a block of apartments was still occupied by civilians and had not been commandeered by ISIL, as was the rumor, and should not be targeted with airstrikes.

The blog also contains the author's personal thoughts on the future of the city as well as fears of being killed. As CNN noted, "Sometimes, Mosul Eye has been rather matter-of-fact, but in recent days, as a bloody battle looms between Iraqi forces advancing on the city and the militant ISIS combatants, the writings have turned decidedly melancholy. A few hours ago, Mosul Eye listened to violinist Itzhak Perlman play a concerto on his Stradivarius. Music, banned by ISIS, helps keeps him alive, he said."

On 5 November, after Iraqi forces had begun fighting in the city, the blogger wrote of his despair at the scenes of death around him, including seeing children playing with corpses of dead ISIL fighters. He wrote that one of his close friends was decapitated by ISIL, "Who will I lose next? What else will I see? I have seen and lived more than enough .. I have seen chopped heads, amputated arms, I have seen people thrown from the top of buildings, thrown over stones .. I have seen their souls trying to hold on to their bodies, but their bodies are so torn apart to hold their spirits. I saw those spirits wondering on the allies of this city!"

He also wrote that they had begun installing bombs around residential buildings. "ISIL is trapping the houses around us with bombs. We live on ticking bombs around us! If airstrikes and gunfire don’t kill us, those car bombs will soon do the job!" He also commented on the ISIL militants wandering among the civilians: "The faces of ISIL are no longer scare me; nothing scary about their faces. I see fear in their eyes, I hear their voices shouting through their chests, and I feel tgem [sic] say to their selves 'what the hell did we got our selves into?' ... At the same time, I see them like dead bodies walking on the ground."

== Blogger's identity ==
During the occupation, the blogger identified himself only as an "independent historian"; other journalists identified him as male. He said he considers himself a historian above all and that he is not a journalist. He began blogging after the U.S.-led invasion in 2003, but his previous blog has not been identified. He said he has used various aliases and identities to gather information and has received repeated online death threats from ISIL. In an interview with The New Yorker, he said he feigns to be a devout Muslim who is enthusiastic about sharia law to gain the trust of extremists. He described ISIL militants as "a group of bonkers [individuals], who could be guided in any direction."

According to Al-Fanar, the blogger appeared to be highly educated, making him an additional target of ISIL, which is suspicious of both religious and secular academics. The blogger later named himself as Omar Mohammed.

== See also ==
- Raqqa Is Being Slaughtered Silently
