= Lyn Alden =

American investment strategist

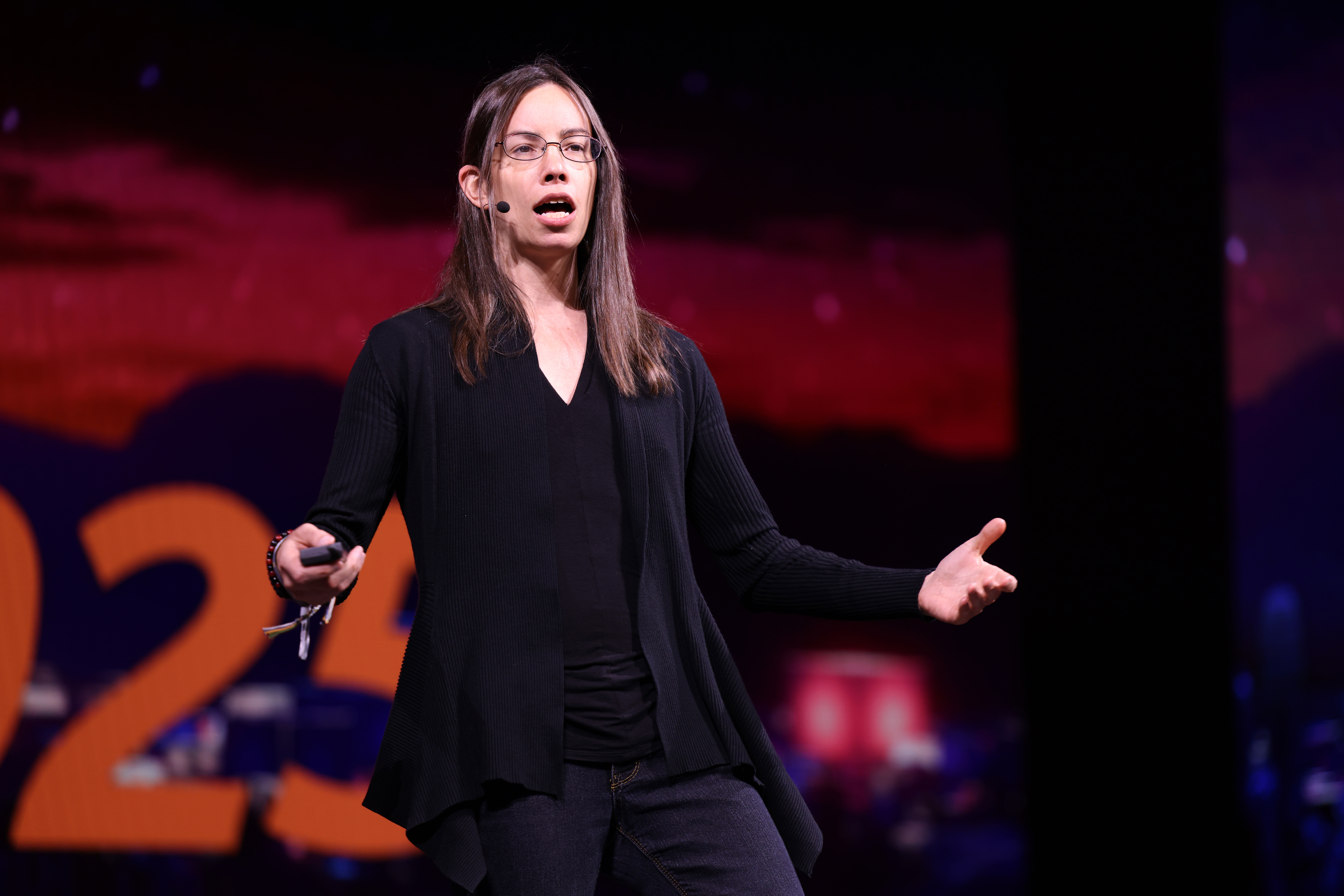
Lyn Alden speaking with attendees at the Bitcoin Conference in 2025 at the Venetian Convention Center in Las Vegas, Nevada.

Madelyn "Lyn" Alden Schwartzer is an American investment strategist and founder of Lyn Alden Investment Strategy. She is known for her macroeconomic analysis of U.S. equities and international market trends. She is also known for her analysis and advocacy of Bitcoin and has been a speaker at the Bitcoin Conference.

== Career ==
Alden has a bachelors degree in electrical engineering and a masters degree in education management.

Alden’s public career as an investment analyst has focused on macroeconomic policy, liquidity, and asset markets. During her career, Alden has written about contrarian investment strategies and comparisons between modern markets and the dot-com bubble, highlighting potential opportunities in emerging markets. Her commentary and analysis mostly pertains to the influence of fiscal deficits, interest rates, and Federal Reserve policy on asset valuation.

Alden has used the phrase "nothing stops this train" to emphasize the growing U.S. debt and asserting concerns about its impact on the economy.

== Views on Bitcoin ==
Alden is recognized for her positive outlook on Bitcoin. She has emphasized its network effect and fixed supply as factors she believes supports its long term value. Alden has argued Bitcoin has short term volatility, it tends to have a "historical volatility profile." She claims Bitcoin is a whole new asset class which is in its "price discovery phase" and should therefore be classified as an "emergent store of value." Alden also believes Bitcoin can serve as a hedge against inflation and monetary debasement, also asserting U.S. and international fiscal deficits and expanded liquidity can increase price appreciation of Bitcoin.

Alden has spoken at multiple Bitcoin Conferences.

== Bibliography ==
- Broken Money, 2023, ISBN 979-8-9886663-1-8
- The Stolguard Incident, 2026, ISBN 979-8988666363
