= Foundation for Human Rights in Cuba =

The Foundation for Human Rights in Cuba (FHRC) is an American 501(c)3 non-profit organization based in Florida and established in 1992 to promote a "non-violent transition to a democratic Cuba." It works to empower independent civil society organizations within Cuba, and also runs initiatives outside of Cuba including fundraising campaigns and raising awareness about conditions in Cuba.

Their work focuses on combatting human trafficking and forced labor, targeting revenue streams that maintain authoritarian control, and exposing transnational organized crime networks.
