= Tutu Alicante =

Equatorial Guinean lawyer

- Alicante in 2026
- Born: Annobon, Equatorial Guinea
- Occupation: Human rights attorney

Tutu Alicante is a human rights lawyer and is the founder and executive director of EG Justice, a nonprofit organization focusing on human rights, anti-corruption, and the rule of law in Equatorial Guinea. Alicante is also a co-founder of the pro-democracy and anti-corruption NGOs Equatoguinean Commission of Jurists, Equatorial Guinea is Ours, and Open Central Africa.

Alicante was born in Annobón, Equatorial Guinea. In his youth he witnessed a state-sponsored atrocity against his village, resulting in his desire to promote human rights in his nation. He would go on to receive advanced degrees from Columbia University and the University of Tennessee.

Alicante is a prominent expert on exposing authoritarianism and corruption and is a frequent contributor to BBC, Radio France International, Voice of America, The Washington Post, The Guardian, and The Economist.

Alicante served as an expert witness in an unprecedented "Biens mal acquis" case in Paris against the Equatoguinean Vice President, which resulted in a criminal conviction and the confiscation of all ill-gotten assets.

Alicante's work has made him a target of Equatoguinean President, Teodoro Obiang, who declared him a "traitor and enemy of the state." He now lives in exile in the United States.
