= Václav Havel Human Rights Prize =

Annual award by the Council of Europe

The Václav Havel Human Rights Prize is an annual €60,000 award which honours "outstanding" civil society action in defence of human rights, in Europe and beyond. Individuals, non-governmental organisations and institutions working to defend human rights anywhere in the world may be nominated. Nine of the thirteen winners to date were in detention because of their human rights activities at the time they received the prize.

== History ==
The award was established in 2013 by the Parliamentary Assembly of the Council of Europe, the Václav Havel Library and the Charta 77 Foundation and is awarded in memory of Václav Havel, former President of Czechoslovakia and the Czech Republic. It replaces the Council of Europe Parliamentary Assembly Human Rights Prize, which was created in 2009 and awarded every two years.

The prize is one of a number that are awarded by different institutions of the Council of Europe and should not be confused with the Václav Havel Prize for Creative Dissent, with which it has no connection.

Half of the €60,000 prize is contributed by the Parliamentary Assembly and half by the Czech Foreign Ministry.

== Prizewinners ==
| Year | Prizewinner(s) | Image | Citizenship(s) | Commentary | Source(s) |
|---|---|---|---|---|---|
| 2013 | Ales Bialiatski | Ales Bialiatski | Belarus | A Belarusian human rights activist, and founder of the Viasna Human Rights Centre. As he was in prison at the time of the award, the Prize was received on his behalf by his wife Natallia Pinchuk. He was subsequently released, and then imprisoned again. | |
| 2014 | Anar Mammadli | Anar Mammadli | Azerbaijan | An Azerbaijani human rights defender who founded an organisation for the independent monitoring of elections in Azerbaijan. As he was in prison at the time of the award, the Prize was received on his behalf by his father Asaf. He was subsequently released. | |
| 2015 | Lyudmila Alexeyeva | Lyudmila Alexeyeva | Russia | A veteran Russian human rights defender, and for many years chair of the Moscow Helsinki Group. | |
| 2016 | Nadia Murad | Nadia Murad | Iraq | A Yazidi human rights activist and Nobel Peace Prize nominee who was herself kidnapped by ISIS in northern Iraq, kept in slavery and abused until she managed to escape. | |
| 2017 | Murat Arslan | Murat Arslan | Turkey | A leading judicial figure in Turkey who headed an independent body representing judges and prosecutors, and a strong advocate of the independence of the judiciary in his country. As he was in prison at the time of the award, the Prize was received on his behalf by a representative of the European magistrates' body MEDEL. | |
| 2018 | Oyub Titiev | Oyub Titiev | Russia | A Russian human rights defender, head of the Grozny office of the Russian human rights organisation Memorial. As Mr Titiev was in prison at the time of the award, it was received on his behalf by Aleksandr Cherkasov, Chairman of the Board of Memorial, and presented to him later in prison by supporters. | |
| 2019 | Ilham Tohti | Ilham Tohti | China | An Uyghur university lecturer and economist serving a life sentence since 2014 on separatism-related charges | |
| 2019 | Youth Initiative for Human Rights | Youth Initiative for Human Rights | Balkans | A network of autonomous non-governmental organizations which brings together young people from different ethnic groups in the Balkans to promote reconciliation | |
| 2020 | Loujain al-Hathloul | Loujain al-Hathloul | Saudi Arabia | A Saudi Arabian women's rights activist | |
| 2021 | Maria Kalesnikava | Maria Kalesnikava | Belarus | A Belarusian opposition leader and activist. As she is currently in prison in Belarus, the Prize was received on her behalf by her sister, Tatsiana Khomich. | |
| 2022 | Vladimir Kara-Murza | Vladimir Kara-Murza | Russia | A Russian political activist, journalist, author, and filmmaker who was in prison in Russia at the time of the award. He was subsequently released in a prisoner swap. | |
| 2023 | Osman Kavala | | Turkey | A Turkish human rights defender, civil society activist, philanthropist and businessman, currently in prison in Turkey. | |
| 2024 | María Corina Machado | | Venezuela | A Venezuelan engineer, civil society activist and politician. | |
| 2025 | Maksym Butkevych | | Ukraine | Journalist and human rights defender | |

Winners of the Council of Europe Parliamentary Assembly Human Rights Prize, which preceded the Václav Havel Human Rights Prize:

- 2011 – Committee against Torture (Komitet Protiv Pytok), a Russian NGO, for its work to assist victims of serious human rights abuses in Russia, and to conduct independent investigations alongside official state investigations, notably in the Chechen Republic.
- 2009 – British Irish Human Rights Watch (now known as Rights Watch UK), a British NGO, for its work to monitor the human rights dimension of the conflict in Northern Ireland and combat impunity in the region.

== Nomination procedure ==
An annual "call for candidates" is issued in January each year. At least five "sponsors" must nominate candidates for the Prize, ahead of an annual deadline, normally fixed for the end of April. Nominations are made online, via a page on the Assembly's website, in either of the two official languages of the Council of Europe, English or French. According to the prize regulations, sponsors must give details of the candidate's work to defend human rights, and provide supporting documentation. Three candidates are shortlisted in September, with the final selection being made in October, just ahead of an award ceremony in Strasbourg.

== Jury and award ceremony ==
The prize is decided by a jury consisting of the President of the Parliamentary Assembly and six independent personalities with expertise in human rights issues. The jury draws up a shortlist of three nominees in September each year, before deciding on an overall winner in October. The prize is awarded at a special ceremony which takes place during the autumn plenary session of the Parliamentary Assembly in Strasbourg. The former Czech First Lady, Dagmar Havlová, is invited to attend.

== See also ==
- Václav Havel Prize for Creative Dissent
