= Raqqa Is Being Slaughtered Silently =

Syrian citizen journalist group

- Part of the Syrian Civil War
- Date: 2014
- Location: Raqqa; 35°57′00″N 39°01′00″E
- Goals: To raise awareness about violent acts perpetrated against Syrian civilians
- Methods: Undercover journalism / reporting; Social media reporting; Anonymous interviews; Photography; Videos; Resistance graphing
- Result: Extensive social media coverage and outreach and television and traditional media coverage

Lead figures
Several anonymous leaders(s).; Hamoud Al-Mousa, co-founder.; Abu Ibrahim a-Raqqawi (founder); Abdalaziz Al-Hamza, CEO & spokesperson.; Hussam Eesa; † Al-Moutaz Bellah Ibrahim (May 2014); † Anonymous, executed.; † Abdul Qadir (Oct. 30th, 2015, Urfa, Turkey); † Fares Hamadi (Oct. 30th, 2015, Urfa, Turkey); † Ahmad Mohammed al-Mousa (Dec. 16, 2015, Idlib).; † Naji Jerf (Dec. 2015, Gaziantep); † Mohamed al-Mousa, activist father.	

Raqqa Is Being Slaughtered Silently (RSS or RBSS; Arabic: الرقة تذبح بصمت, romanized: al-Raqqah Tadhbaḥu bi-Ṣamt) is a citizen journalist group reporting Syrian war news and human rights abuses by Islamic State of Iraq and the Levant (ISIL) and other forces occupying the northern Syrian city of Raqqa which ISIL used as its de facto capital. RBSS works to counter the suggestion that citizens of Raqqa welcomed the presence of ISIL. Some sources described the group as one of the few reliable sources of information from the city. It was founded by Abu Ibrahim a-Raqqawi. RBSS has described itself as an "nonpartisan and independent" news page.

== Activities ==
The group has published first hand accounts, videos and photos of life and war crimes in Raqqa through its Facebook page and website, other social media, and via interviews and furnishing material to media organizations worldwide. As a result, RBSS has been cited by international media outlets fairly extensively, and major news outlets have done feature stories on the group. Since no foreign or domestic journalists could operate in Raqqa during the ISIL occupation, the efforts of RBSS provided unique insights. The work was dangerous, with ISIL militants searching for, torturing and in some cases killing suspected RBSS members.

== Members ==
According to an interview with VICE News, there were originally 17 members who started out opposing the Syrian government. When ISIL moved into the city in April 2014 the group started posting information about ISIL. One member who had fled Raqqa said "After we launched the campaign and posted a lot of crucifixions and executions on the news and Facebook and Twitter, they made three Friday sermons about us, saying we are infidels and we're against Allah and "we'll catch them and we'll execute them." "We are 12 inside the city and four outside. Before the 12 inside the city were posting on Twitter and posting on Facebook, and talking to journalists, but it's very dangerous. So we decided to use a "secret room," and the people in the city post all the photos, the news, and everything, and the four that are out, we are posting it on the internet, Twitter, and Facebook, and talking to journalists. We hide behind fake names and we don't trust anyone, so we don't get captured."

Several members of RBSS have been executed inside Raqqa. In May 2014, Al-Moutaz Bellah Ibrahim was kidnapped by ISIL and murdered. In July 2015, ISIL released a video showing two men identified as Bashir Abduladhim al-Saado and Faisal Hussain al-Habib being strung up on trees and shot. Though ISIL claimed the two murdered men had worked with RBSS, one of the founders of RBSS denied they were members. Another friend of the group was similarly executed. On August 15, 2015, Mohamed al-Mousa, the father of one of the group's founders, was killed in ISIL custody, along with two other captives. On October 30, 2015, RBSS activist Ibrahim Abdul Qadir (age 20) and his friend Fares Hamadi were found stabbed and beheaded in Urfa, Turkey. It was the first acknowledged assassination outside of ISIL controlled territory.

Abdalaziz Al-Hamza acts as a spokesperson. At least five members of the group live outside Syria.

Hamoud Al-Mousa is the co-founder and spokesperson.

On December 16, 2015, masked men murdered RBSS member Ahmad Mohammed al-Mousa in the then rebel held city of Idlib, Syria.

Naji al Jerf, the group's film director and editor-in-chief of the independent monthly Hentah, was killed in Gaziantep, Turkey with a silenced pistol in broad daylight outside a media building in late December 2015. ISIL claimed responsibility on Twitter.

In an interview with Sarah Montague on BBC HARDtalk, aired June 22, 2016, RBSS spokesman Hussam Eesa said, via interpreter, "When we chose to work together against Daesh, documenting its abuses, we understood there would be casualties. However, it's been worse than we expected. It is an inevitable price to be paid. So far we have lost 14 people – four group members and 10 friends and family members. Currently we have 18 inside Raqqa and 10 outside Raqqa."

== Significant stories ==
When ISIL banned home internet in Raqqah and forced internet users into cafes where they could be monitored, RBSS started releasing unfiltered information about life under ISIL rule.

RBSS members broke the story of the failed U.S. special forces raid to save journalist James Foley and the other hostages.

Soon after the release of a video showing the burning alive of a Jordanian pilot, Muath Al-Kasasbeh, RBSS released Google Earth photos they cross-referenced to landmarks pinpointing the location of the execution in the southern part of Raqqa near the river. They also reported that videos of the execution were played for the public on large screens throughout the city of Raqqa.

RBSS detailed that the effects of Russian airstrikes in and around Raqqa were targeting mainly civilian targets, and having little effect on ISIL.

The group also relayed reports from the ground of illegal white phosphorus munitions used in airstrikes.

== Awards and praise ==
The group was awarded the International Press Freedom Award in 2015, from the Committee to Protect Journalists. The citation said in part "While RBSS was formed to document the atrocities of [ISIL], its members have also reported critically on the Assad government's bombings, other rebel forces, and civilian casualties caused by U.S.-led airstrikes". RBSS was given the 2016 Civil Courage Prize for "risking their lives on a daily basis to document the abuses of the Islamic State."

Kyle Orton, writing for The Independent, said "The risks are extreme. Their bravery quite extraordinary" and wrote "Where [ISIL] presented a functioning, just government, RBSS showed the scarcity and brutality. Not a few foreign fighters ... have gone to wage "five-star jihad" ... only to be disillusioned... that [ISIL] is reportedly having to kill them to stop them leaving. RBSS's work, therefore, offers the chance of preventing people inclined toward [ISIL's] ideology actually going to Syria."

City of Ghosts is a 2017 documentary about the group.

== See also ==
- Syrian Observatory for Human Rights
- Mosul Eye, blog on life under ISIL rule in Mosul, Iraq
