= Omar Mohammed =

Iraqi historian and journalist (born 1986)

- عمر بن محمد (Arabic)
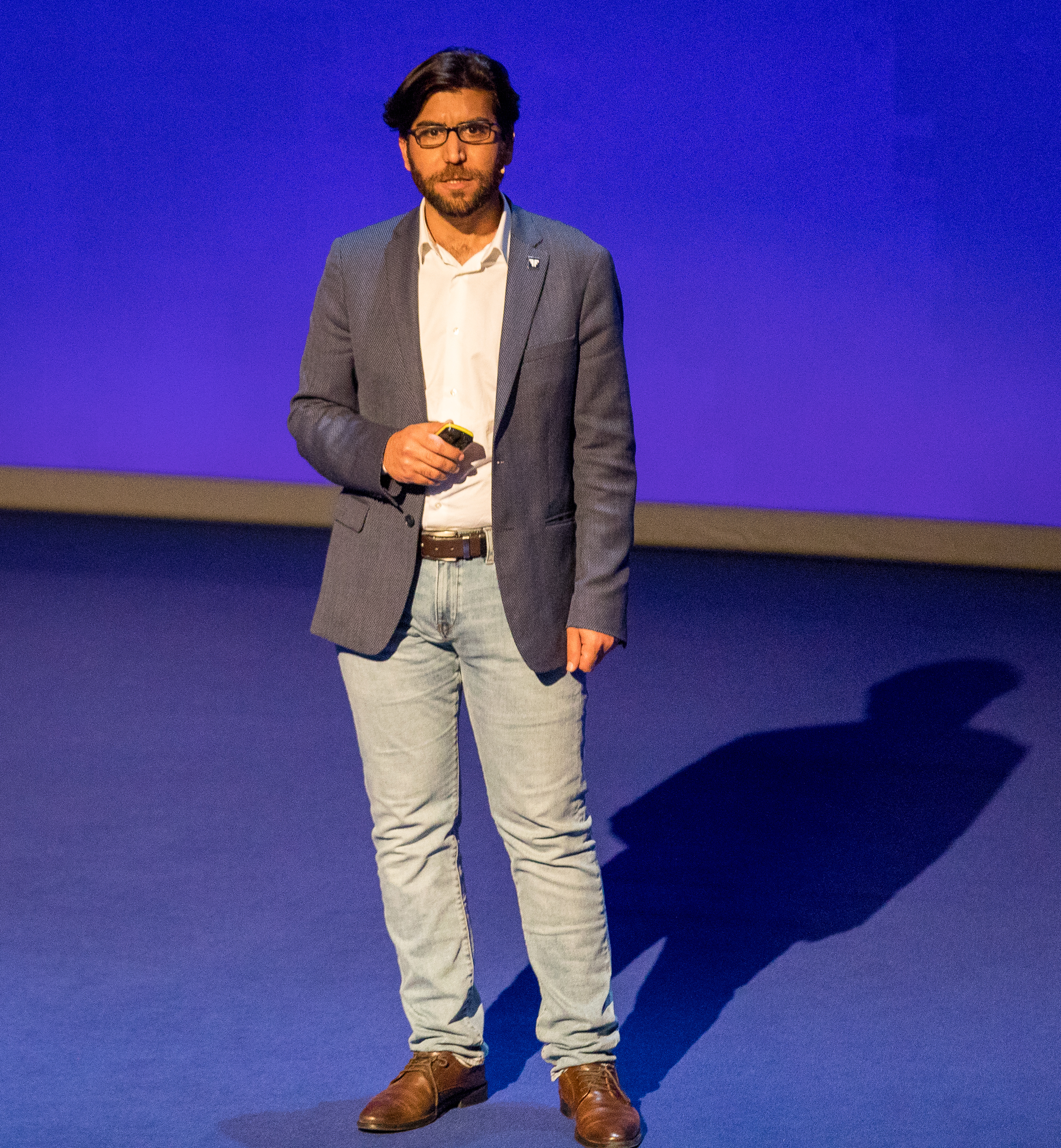
- Mohammed at the Oslo Freedom Forum in Norway, 2018
- Born: 1986 (age 39–40); Mosul, Iraq
- Education: University of Mosul
- Occupations: Historian; citizen journalist; musician
- Years active: 2003–present
- Website: mosul-eye.org

Omar Mohammed (Arabic: عمر بن محمد; born 1986) is an Iraqi historian, citizen journalist, and musician. He is best-known for creating Mosul Eye, an online news blog through which he documented life in the city of Mosul when it was occupied by the Islamic State between 2014 and 2017. He lives in exile, having left Iraq in 2017, and currently maintains the blog from France.

== Early life and education ==
Mohammed was born in Mosul in 1986, during the Iran–Iraq War, and was raised in the city. He graduated from the University of Mosul in 2012, after defending his dissertation on the French occupation of Egypt. He returned to the university as a professor and taught there until 2014, when it was shut down by the Islamic State.

== Iraq War and the Islamic State ==
'All I could see was blood' is how Omar often described the time he lived in Mosul under the rule of the ISIS. He became widely known for documenting the daily life in Mosul between 2003 and 2018. He still runs his blog from his exile. He traveled around the world to seek support for his city Mosul. A few months before the liberation of Mosul from ISIS, Omar organized a musical on the historical site of prophet Jonah on the east bank of Mosul to defy ISIS with music.

=== Creation of Mosul Eye ===
Access to the internet is still more limited in Mosul compared to the rest of Iraq. While IS did not restrict access to the internet as such, they imposed high taxes on internet providers leaving the city with limited access to this day. (Note: See UN Habit Report, 2016) Despite this, a number of growing local online media initiatives are proving to be popular. Ein Al Mosul, or Mosul Eye, was a blog, written anonymously, that documented events in Mosul under the occupation of IS, providing citizens of Mosul and, perhaps even more so, diaspora and the international community with vital information and evidence of IS atrocities.. After the battle of Mosul, Mosul Eye played a different role, 'which is to rebuild civil society, trying to support the people who stayed in the city, trying to give them a voice, because they were voiceless'. The blog now focuses on the 'recovery' of Mosul.

== Mosul International Campaign ==
After he fled Mosul in 2015, Mohammed launched a campaign to advocate and bring awareness to the situation in Mosul and Iraq as a whole. He has travelled to various countries, including the United States and Russia, to make speeches and participate in talks, while lecturing and advocating at universities, institutes, and other global venues. His mission is to "put Mosul on the global map" as stated in his public speeches. He has been hosted by many international universities and governments. Mohammed has also, on different occasions, advocated for Mosul to be put under international trusteeship to protect the local populace.

== Personal life ==
As of 2020, Mohammed lives in Paris and is unable to return to Mosul. His old brother was killed by shrapnel from a mortar strike during the Battle of Mosul, when the Iraqi government retook the city from the Islamic State. He is a fan of Israeli-American violinist Itzhak Perlman.

He appeared in the 2020 British documentary film Once Upon a Time in Iraq, in which he describes his experiences during the 2003 invasion of Iraq, the Iraq War and the Iraqi insurgency, and the Second Iraq War, particularly detailing aspects of the occupation of Mosul by the Islamic State between 2014 and 2017.

== Published works ==
1- The history of the French expedition on Egypt in the writings of Abd al-Rahman al-Jabarti, Jordan 2013.

Omar has produced several documents but they are still unpublished manuscripts:

1- Annals of Mosul from 2003 to 2014. Unpublished manuscript. 2- The Chronicles of Mosul under the rule of the Islamic State.Unpublished manuscript.

The manuscript covers the history of Mosul from 6 June 2014 when ISIS occupied Mosul to July 2017 when the city was liberated.

3- the Wonders of Mosul's recovery and its surrounding areas.

Is a historical document written by Omar documenting the daily recovery of Mosul since its libration in 2017.

4- Al Tarikh al 'Umari fi 'Imār al jāmi al Nuri wa yalih-i 'Imar Kanisat-ul Sa'a wa-T Tahira' 5- Al 'Anfas al Mahbusa fi 'aldifaa' 'an al Mawsil al mahrusa "The Caged Breaths in Defending the Protected Mosul". Unpublished manuscript.

The front cover of the manuscript reads: "This is a declaration of what the humble to his god's mercy, Omar b. Mohammed al Mawsili in his exile (.... text removed) on his daily observation in (text removed) and other countries in defending of his hometown Mosul and its people to create a better future for his watan and protect its nation, may god protect it against all its enemies until god makes his return to Mosul possible"
