= Al-Furat University =

University in Syria

Coordinates: 35°19′8″N 40°6′38″E

al-Furat University
- جَامِعَـــةُ الْفُـــرَات
- Type: Public university
- Established: 2006
- President: Dr. Mounir Al-Aroud
- Total staff: 420
- Students: 55,232
- Location: University Street, Deir ez-Zor, Deir ez-Zor; Raqqa, Syria
- Website: alfuratuniv.edu.sy

Al-Furat University (Arabic: جَامِعَةُ الْفُرَات, romanized: Jāmiʿatu l-Furāt) is a Syrian public university founded in July 2006. It is located mainly in Deir ez-Zor, which hosts the medical school, and has campuses in Raqqa and Al-Hasakah. Before 2011 it was the smallest public university in Syria. The university runs its own open access journal. The responsible authority for the campuses in Deir ez-Zor and Raqqa is the Ministry of Higher Education and Scientific Research.

Before 2011 the university taught undergraduate and post-graduated medicine to an internationally recognised standard.

== History ==
In 2014 Islamic State imposed behavioural conditions on the staff and students of the university's Raqqa campus to remain open. In January 2015 they forced the campus to close.

Due to the Syrian civil war, the University and its campuses have been sites of conflict. On 28 January 2017, students were reportedly at risk from active combat on and around the Deir ez-Zor campus. In 2022 during the Battle of al-Hasakah, the Economics building of the Al-Hasakah campus was bombed by Combined Joint Task Force planes targeting Islamic State fighters.

In late January 2026, a branch of Al-Furat University was opened in Raqqa. The campus includes eight faculties: Civil Engineering, Arts and Humanities, Science, Education, Agriculture, Pharmacy, Law, and Economics. It is the first university established in the Raqqa Governorate. Al-Sharq University, established by the AANES in Raqqah in 2021 was merged with the new Al-Furat one by the Syrian administration.

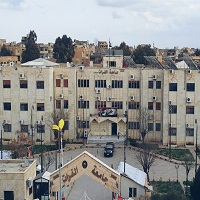
University building in 2019
