= Michael Wolffsohn =

German historian (born 1947)

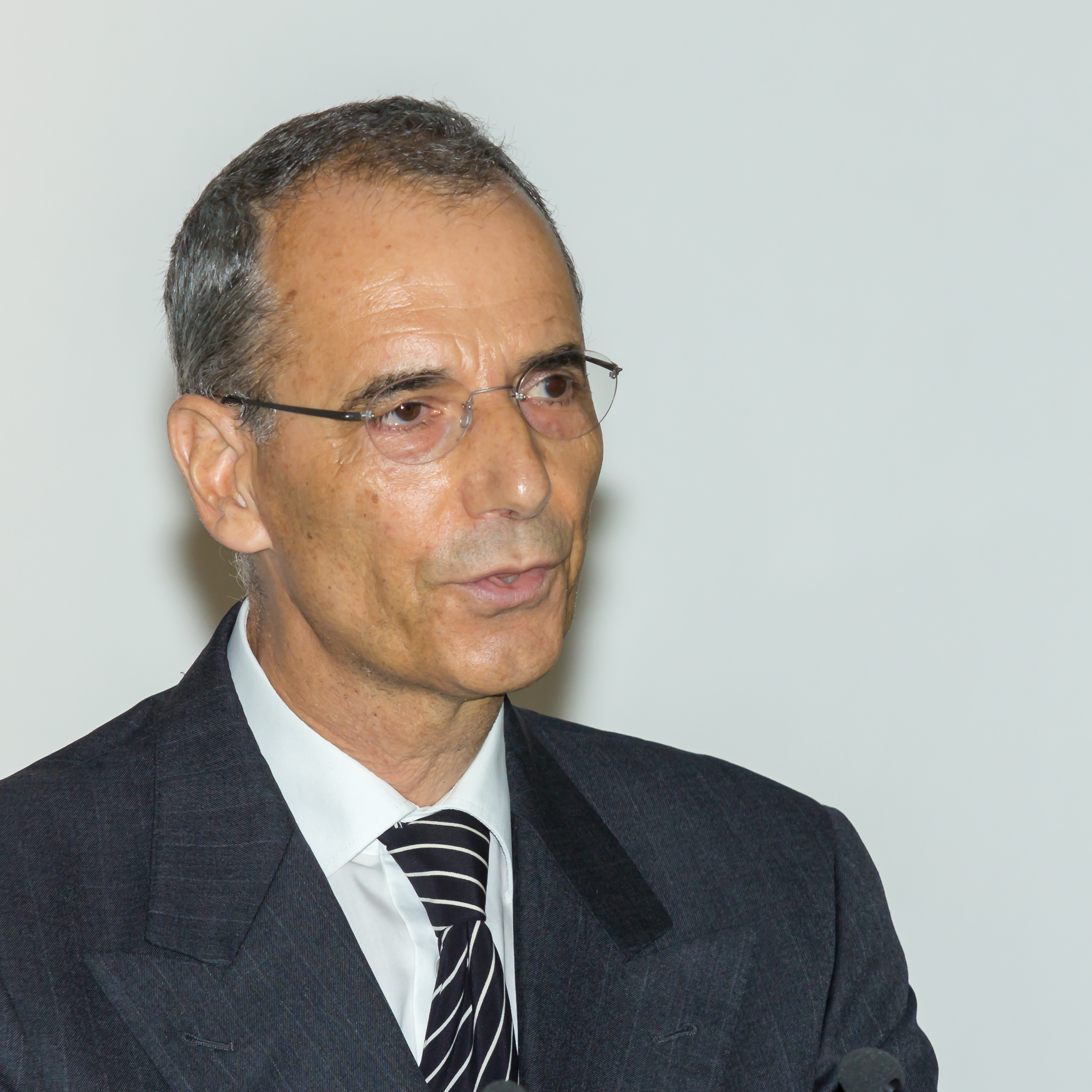
Michael Wolffsohn, 2015

Michael Wolffsohn (born 17 May 1947) is a German historian.

== Biography ==
Wolffsohn was born in Tel Aviv, in what was then the British Mandate of Palestine and today is Israel. His parents were German Jews who had fled in 1939.

In 1954, the Wolffsohns moved to Germany, settling in West Berlin. In 1966, Wolffsohn began his studies at the Free University of Berlin and continued his studies at Tel Aviv University and Columbia University. He obtained a PhD in History in 1975. From 1967 to 1970, Wolffsohn served in the Israeli Defence Forces. From 1975 until 1980, Wolffsohn taught at the University of the Saarland. Since 1981, Wolffsohn has served as a professor at the University of the Bundeswehr Munich as a professor in Contemporary History. His major interests are Israeli history, international relations, and German Jewish history.

Wolffsohn has argued in favor of German patriotism and has claimed that the crimes of National Socialism represent no reason why modern Germans cannot be proud of their country. In his book Eternal Guilt? (1993), he argued against the idea of Germans having to bear guilt for the Holocaust for all time.

Wolffsohn has strongly supported Israel and has argued for greater Western understanding and support of the Jewish state in face of what Wolffsohn regards as fanatical Islamic extremism. Likewise, Wolffsohn has supported the war on terror and the administration of George W. Bush. In May 2005, he was a leading critic of the chairman of the Social Democratic Party of Germany, Franz Müntefering, who compared a group of American capitalists attempting to purchase a German company to a “plague of locusts”. Wolffsohn noted that the capitalists in question were Jewish, and that the Nazis had often compared Jews to locusts, and labeled Müntefering an anti-Semite. Wolffsohn wrote that as a grandson of Holocaust survivors, he was grateful to the Americans for liberating his grandparents and that as a German Jew, he felt deep shame over increasing German anti-Americanism. More recently, Wolffsohn has been a leading critic of the novelist Günter Grass over his disclosure about his membership in the Waffen-SS during World War II.

Wolffsohn is a strong supporter of Chancellor Angela Merkel's refugee policy calling migrants "a gift from the heavens" in an August 2015 guest column for leading German language business newspaper Handelsblatt. In the same article, he called the native German population's fear of "peaceful immigrants in search of sanctuary or a better life", "hysterical, dumb and their expulsion immoral as well as detrimental to their own interests."

== Work ==
- Eine andere Jüdische Weltgeschichte, Herder 2022 ISBN 978-3-7425-0917-8.
- Meine Juden—eure Juden, Piper 1997 ISBN 3-492-03637-6.
- Die Deutschland Akte: Juden und Deutsche in Ost und West : Tatsachen und Legenden, Ed. Ferenczy bei Bruckmann 1995 ISBN 3-7654-2730-6.
- Frieden jetzt? Nahost im Umbruch, Ed. Ferenczy bei Bruckmann ISBN 3-7654-2707-1.
- Eternal Guilt? Forty Years of German-Jewish Relations, Columbia University Press 1993 ISBN 0-231-08274-6.
- Verwirrtes Deutschland? Provokative Zwischenberufe eines deutschjüdischen Patrioten, Ed. Frenczy bei Bruckmann 1993 ISBN 3-7654-2706-3.
- Wem gehört das Heilige Land? Die Wurzeln des Streits zwischen Juden und Arabern, C. Bertelsmann 1992 ISBN 3-570-01622-6.
- Spanien, Deutschland und die "Jüdische Weltmacht": über Moral, Realpolitik und Vergangenheitsbewältigung, C. Bertelsmann ISBN 3-570-00355-8.
- Keine Angst vor Deutschland! Straube 1990 ISBN 3-927491-32-2.
- Ewige Schuld? 40 Jahre deutsch-juedisch-israelische Beziehungen, Munich: Piper, 1989 ISBN 3-492-10985-3.
- Israel : polity, society, economy, 1882–1986: An introductory handbook, Atlantic Highlands, NJ: Humanities Press International, 1987 ISBN 0-391-03540-1.
- West Germany's Foreign Policy in the Era of Brandt and Schmidt, 1969–1982: An Introduction, Peter Lang Publishing 1986 ISBN 3-8204-8616-X.
- German-Saudi Arabian Arms Deals 1936–1939 and 1981–1985: With an essay on West Germany’s Jews, Frankfurt am Main: P. Lang, 1985, ISBN 3-8204-7490-0.
- Die Debatte über den Kalten Krieg: Politische Konjunkturen, historisch-politische Analysen, Leske + Budrich 1982 ISBN 3-8100-0368-9.
