= City of Ghosts (2017 film) =

2017 documentary film by Matthew Heineman

- Theatrical release poster
- Directed by: Matthew Heineman
- Produced by: Matthew Heineman
- Cinematography: Matthew Heineman
- Edited by: Matthew Hamachek; Matthew Heineman; Pax Wassermann
- Music by: Jackson Greenberg; H. Scott Salinas
- Production company: Our Time Projects
- Distributed by: Amazon Studios
- Release date: January 21, 2017 (Sundance Film Festival)
- Running time: 93 minutes
- Country: United States
- Language: Arabic

City of Ghosts (Arabic: مدينة الأشباح, romanized: Madīnat al-Ashbāḥ) is a 2017 Arabic-language American documentary film about the Syrian media activist group Raqqa Is Being Slaughtered Silently as they face the realities of life undercover, on the run, and in exile after their homeland is taken over by ISIS in 2014. The film was directed by Oscar-nominated and Emmy Award-winning filmmaker Matthew Heineman (Cartel Land).

Heineman won the Outstanding Directorial Achievement in Documentary Award from the Directors Guild of America for the film, becoming one of only three people to win the prestigious honor twice. City of Ghosts also won the Courage Under Fire Award from the International Documentary Association "in recognition of conspicuous bravery in the pursuit of truth" and was listed on over 20 critic and year-end lists for Best Documentary of 2017. City of Ghosts was nominated for the Primetime Emmy Award for Exceptional Merit in Documentary Filmmaking, BAFTA Award, PGA Award, IDA Award for Best Documentary Features.

== Release ==
The film premiered at the 2017 Sundance Film Festival. It was subsequently acquired by Amazon in a $2 million deal.

The film was released theatrically by Amazon Studios, A&E IndieFilms and IFC Films on July 14, 2017.

== Reception ==
City of Ghosts received critical acclaim upon release. As of 4 February 2021, the film holds a 98% 'fresh' rating on Rotten Tomatoes, based on 105 reviews, with an average rating of 8.40/10. The website's critical consensus reads, "City of Ghosts takes a hard-hitting, ground-level look at atrocities in a part of the world that may seem foreign to many viewers, but whose impact will be no less devastating." On Metacritic, it holds a rating of 86/100, based on 31 reviews, indicating "universal acclaim". Charlie Phillips of The Guardian gave the film five stars and called it "the definitive contemporary documentary about the tragedy of Syria."

== Awards and nominations ==
Award	Date of ceremony	Category	Recipients and nominees	Result
BAFTA Awards	February 18, 2018	Best Documentary	City of Ghosts	Nominated
Chicago Film Critics Association	December 10, 2017	Best Documentary	City of Ghosts	Nominated
Cinema Eye Honors	January 11, 2018	Best Documentary, Best Director, Best Production	City of Ghosts	Nominated
CPH:DOX	March 26, 2017	Audience Award	City of Ghosts	Won
Creative Arts Emmy Awards	September 8, 2018	Exceptional Merit in Documentary Filmmaking	City of Ghosts	Nominated
Critics Choice Documentary Awards	November 2, 2017	Best Director, Best Documentary	Matthew Heineman	Nominated
Dallas Fort Worth Film Critics Association	December 13, 2017	Best Documentary	City of Ghosts	Won
Dallas International Film Festival	April 10, 2017	Silver Heart Award	City of Ghosts	Won
Directors Guild of America Awards	February 4, 2018	Outstanding Directorial Achievement in Documentary	Matthew Heineman	Won
Docville	March 30, 2017	Jury Award Best Conscience Documentary	City of Ghosts	Won
Galway Film Fleadh	July 17, 2017	Best Human Rights Feature	City of Ghosts	Won
Greenwich International Film Festival	June 2017	Best Social Impact Film	City of Ghosts	Won
International Documentary Association	September 12, 2017	Courage Under Fire Award	Matthew Heineman	Won
International Documentary Association Awards	December 9, 2017	Best Documentary	City of Ghosts	Nominated
International Press Academy Satellite Awards	February 10, 2018	Best Motion Picture, Documentary	City of Ghosts	Nominated
Iowa Film Critics Association	January 9, 2018	Best Documentary	City of Ghosts	Nominated
Jerusalem Film Festival	June 22, 2017	Best Documentary	City of Ghosts	Won
Melbourne International Film Festival	August 20, 2017	Best Documentary	City of Ghosts	Nominated
Montclair Film Festival	May 7, 2017	Special Jury Prize for Direction	Matthew Heineman	Won
Munich Film Festival	June 24, 2017	Fritz-Gerlich Prize	Matthew Heineman	Won
North Texas Film Critics Association	December 6, 2017	Best Documentary	City of Ghosts	Nominated
Producers Guild of America Awards	January 20, 2018	Outstanding Producer of Documentary Theatrical Motion Pictures	Matthew Heineman	Nominated
Phoenix Critics Circle	December 11, 2017	Best Documentary Film	City of Ghosts	Won
Phoenix Film Critics Society Awards	December 19, 2017	Best Documentary	City of Ghosts	Won
San Francisco Film Critics Circle	December 10, 2017	Best Documentary	City of Ghosts	Nominated
Seattle Film Critics Awards	December 18, 2017	Best Documentary	City of Ghosts	Nominated
Seattle International Film Festival	June 11, 2017	Golden Space Needle Award	City of Ghosts	Nominated
Sheffield Doc/Fest Awards	June 2017	Grand Jury Award	City of Ghosts	Won
Social Impact Media Awards	January 2018	Documentary Features	City of Ghosts	Nominated
St. Louis Film Critics Association	December 10, 2017	Best Documentary	City of Ghosts	Nominated
Sundance Film Festival	2017	Candescent Award	City of Ghosts	Won
Sundance Film Festival	January 28, 2017	Grand Jury Prize – US Documentary	Matthew Heineman	Nominated
Washington DC Area Film Critics Association Awards	December 8, 2017	Best Documentary	City of Ghosts	Nominated
