= List of people who were beheaded =

The following is a list of people who were beheaded, arranged alphabetically by country or region and with date of decapitation. Special section on "Religious figures" is also appended.

These individuals lost their heads intentionally (as a form of execution or posthumously). A list of people who were decapitated accidentally, including animal-related deaths, can be found at List of people who were decapitated.

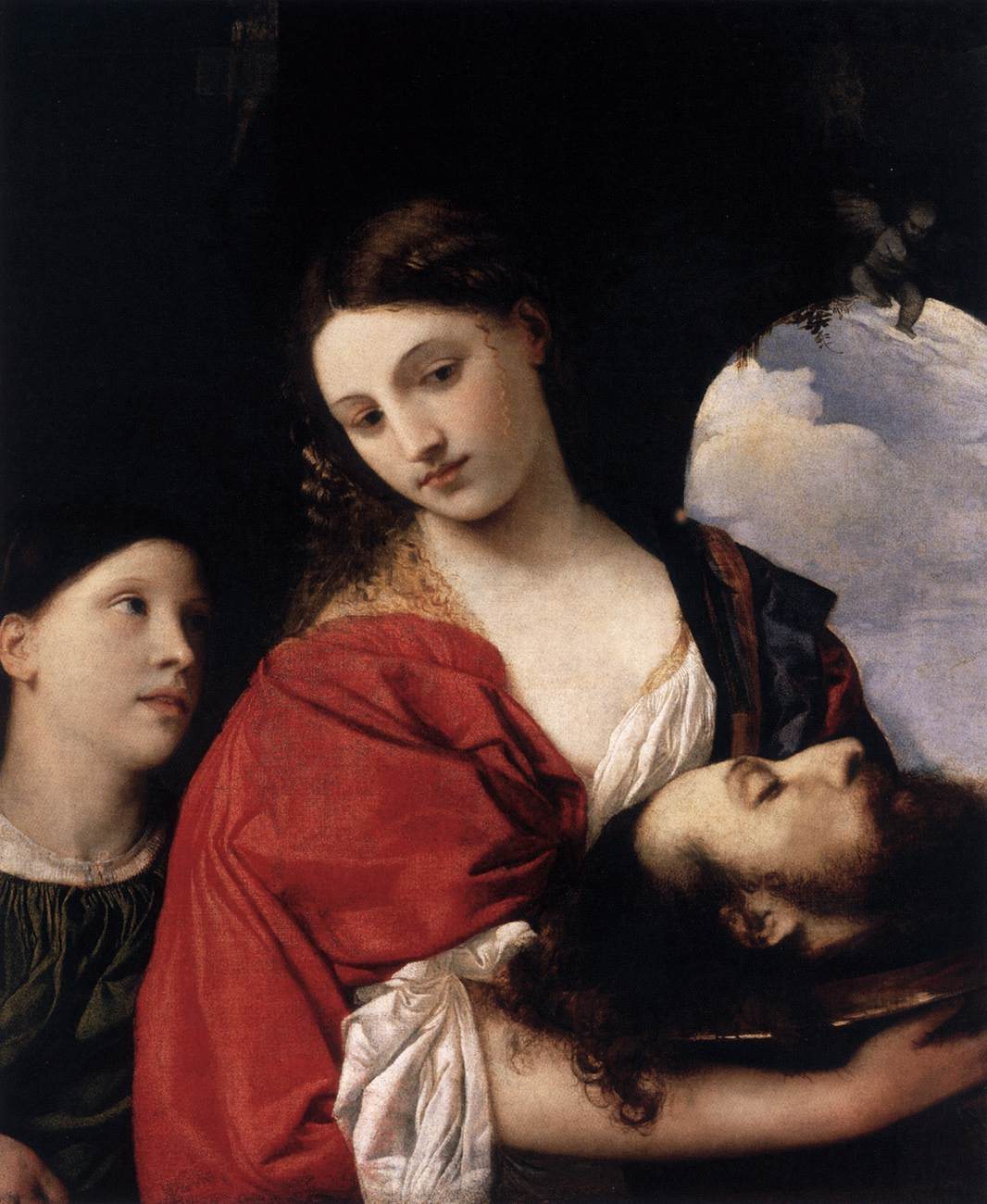
Salome and the Beheading of St. John the Baptist, by Titian

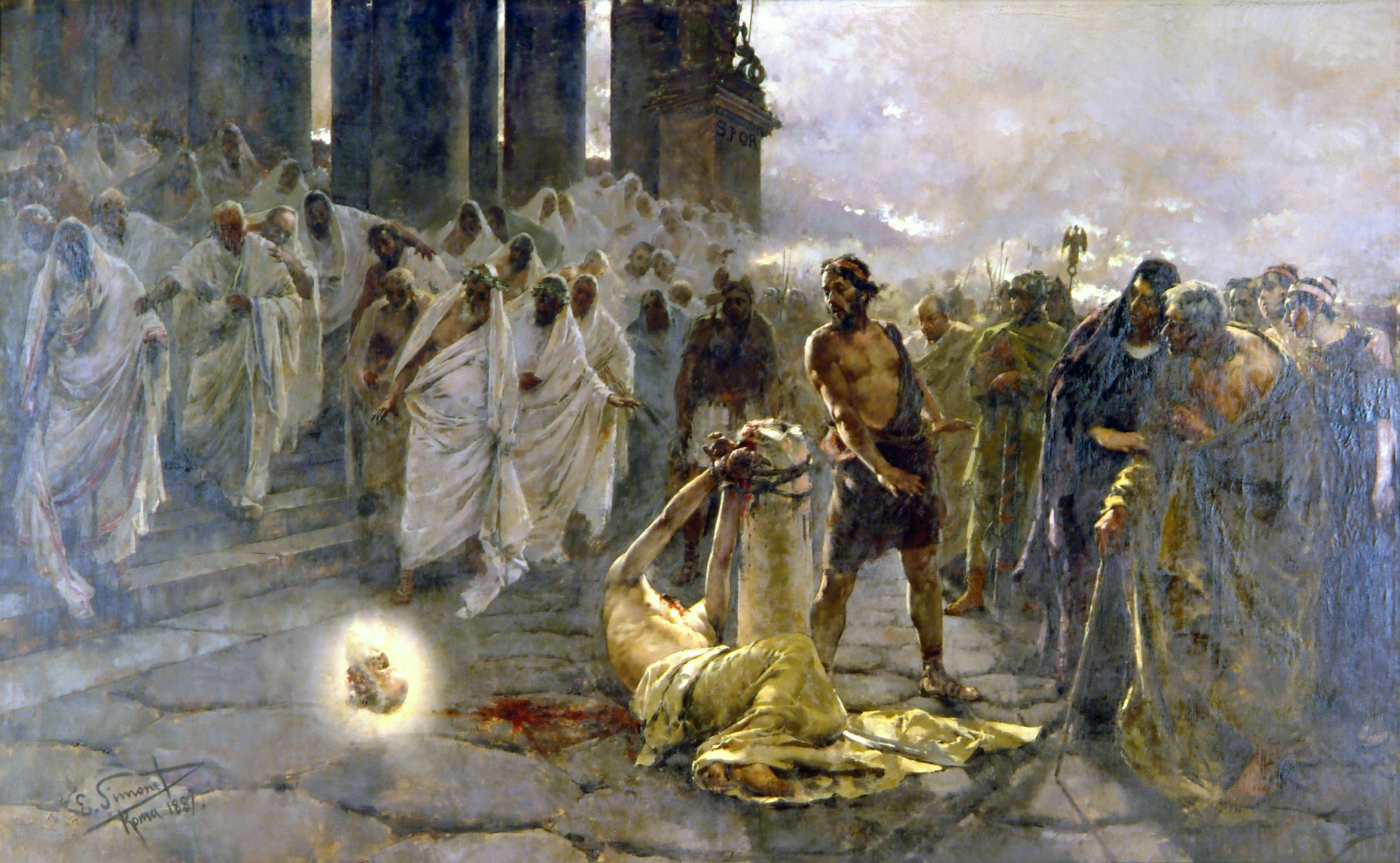
The Beheading of Saint Paul. Painting by Enrique Simonet in 1887

== Austria ==
- Joseph Haydn (1809) – celebrated composer posthumously beheaded; see Haydn's skull

== Azerbaijan ==
- Kyaram Sloyan (2016) – Yazidi soldier, posthumously decapitated by Azerbaijani soldiers during the 2016 Nagorno-Karabakh conflict. Photos and videos of various soldiers posing with his severed head were widely circulated online after his death.
- Genadi Petrosyan (2020) – ethnically Armenian citizen of the Nagorno-Karabakh Republic (Republic of Artsakh) beheaded by Azerbaijani soldiers during the 2020 Nagorno-Karabakh war.
- Yuri Asryan (2020) – ethnically Armenian citizen of the Nagorno-Karabakh Republic (Republic of Artsakh) beheaded by Azerbaijani soldiers during the 2020 Nagorno-Karabakh war. Along with Genadi Petrosyan, videos and photos of both beheadings were circulated through social media, most notably Telegram.

== Brazil ==
- Jordão da Silva Cantanhede (2013) – a Brazilian amateur football referee, was lynched, quartered, and beheaded by football spectators in Pio XII, Maranhão, after he stabbed a player to death in a match he officiated on 30 June 2013. Spectators then put his head on a stake in the middle of the pitch. A viral video later surfaced of medical officials reassembling his body.
- João Rodrigo Silva Santos (2013) – Brazilian football player, murdered and beheaded by suspected drug traffickers.
- Wanderly Ribeiro de Souza (2024) – stabbed to death and decapitated by his own son, Victor Wander Ribeiro de Souza, on a public park in Natal, Rio Grande do Norte.

== Canada ==
- Fred Fulton (2005) – stabbed to death along with Veronica "Verna" Decarie by Gregory Allan Despres during paranoid schizophrenia-led delusions. Fulton was additionally beheaded with a homemade sword.
- Tim McLean (2008) – murdered, beheaded, and partially cannibalized by Vince Weiguang Li on a Greyhound Canada bus in Portage la Prairie, Manitoba.
- Jun Lin (2012) – fatally stabbed, dismembered, sexually violated and possibly cannibalized in a video depicting his murder by Luka Rocco Magnotta. His severed head was recovered at the edge of a small lake in Montreal's Angrignon Park.
- Fribjon Bjornson (2012) – severed head found on the Nak'azdli reserve near Fort St. James, British Columbia.
- Bob Roth (2012) – severed head found inside a garbage bag in Edmonton. He was killed by members of the White Boy Posse.
- Tien Ly (2022) – decapitated after being killed by her son, Dallas Ly.

== Central African Republic ==
- Didier Wangay (2021) – Former acting Mayor of Bambari; Wagner and FACA arrested Wangay and his family in Gallougou on 15 December 2021 and beheaded him, his son, wife, niece, and nephew. Afterwards, their heads were displayed in Bambari as trophies.
- Josué Béfio (2024) – Anti-balaka leader in Ouham-Fafa; Béfio, along with his bodyguard, were beheaded at a military base in Bouca.

== China ==
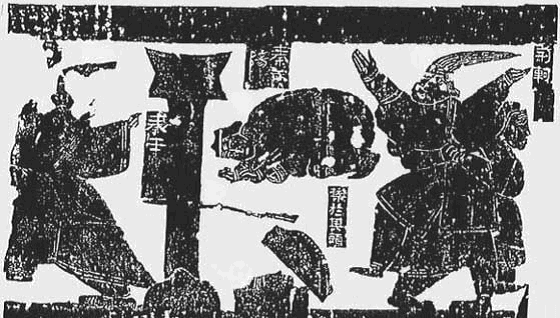
Mural depicting Jing Ke's assassination attempt on the King of Qin; the severed head of Huan Yi is in an open box at bottom.

- Huan Yi (Fan Wuji) (桓齮, 227 BC) – traitorous Qin general; his severed head was instrumental in Jing Ke's assassination attempt of the Qin king.
- Han Xin (韓信, 196 BC) – executed by Empress Lü
- Wang Mang (王莽, 23 AD) – Founder of the Xin dynasty; posthumously beheaded after being killed by a rebel mob.
- Guan Yu (關羽, 219) – executed during civil war by Sun Quan
- Guan Ping (關平, 219) – son of Guan Yu, executed during civil war by Sun Quan
- Yu Cong (于琮, 881) – Tang official beheaded by agrarian rebel Huang Chao
- Li Yun (887) – decapitated by Wang Chongrong
- Zhu Mei (887) – decapitated by Wang Xingyu
- Chen Jingxuan (陳敬瑄, 893) – Tang general
- Cui Zhaowei (崔昭緯, 896) – Tang official
- Wen Tianxiang (文天祥, 1283) – scholar and general
- Wang Zhi (王直, 1560) – pirate and smuggler executed by the Ming dynasty
- Xia Wanchun (夏完淳, 1647) – poet, executed by Qing official Hong Chengchou who betrayed Ming before the Ming dynasty fell.
- St Francis de Capillas (聖劉方濟, 1648) – beheaded at Fogang County
- Adolf Schlagintweit (1857) – German botanist and explorer; executed by the ruler of Kashgar
- Lin Xu (林旭, 1898) and Tan Sitong (譚嗣同, 1898) – executed with four others during the Qing dynasty by Empress Dowager Cixi
- John and Betty Stam (1934) – American Christian missionaries executed by the Chinese Red Army
- Jun Lin (2012) chinese student beheaded and dismembered by Luka Rocco Magnotta

== Chile ==
- María José Reyes and Juan Duarte (2012) – beheaded by a seller of antiquities in Lolol.

== Croatia ==
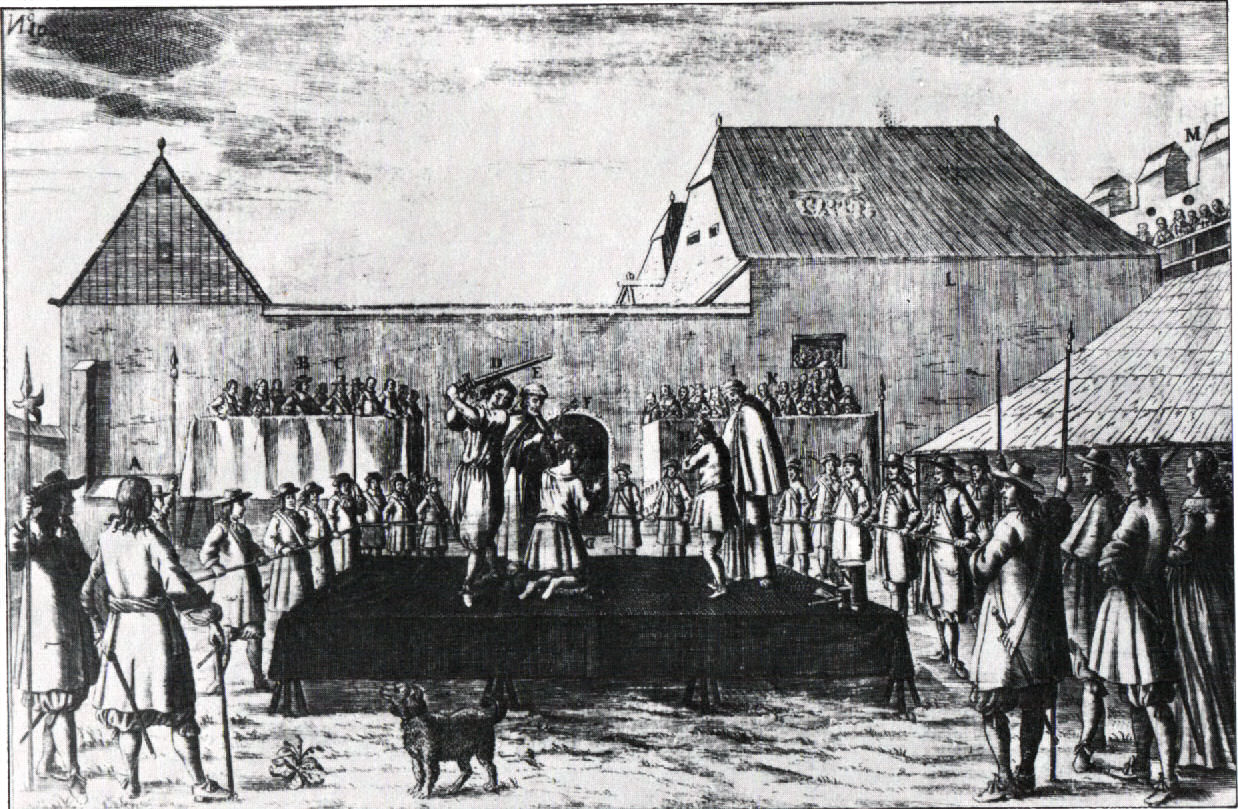
Execution of Petar Zrinski and Fran Krsto Frankopan in Wiener Neustadt.

- Petar Berislavić (1520) – beheaded in combat as he got surrounded by many Ottoman soldiers. His head and body were retrieved by Croatian soldiers and taken first to Bihać and subsequently to Veszprem.
- Petar Kružić (1537) – beheaded in combat against the Ottomans. His severed head was then demonstrated to defenders of Klis fortress to persuade them to surrender.
- Nikola Šubić Zrinski (1566) – killed and posthumously beheaded by the Ottomans during the Siege of Szigetvár.
- Petar Zrinski and Fran Krsto Frankopan (1671) – sentenced to death and beheaded for conspiring against Habsburg emperor.
- Tomislav Salopek (2015) – Croatian topographer who was abducted by ISIS in Egypt and subsequently beheaded.

== Denmark ==
- Anne Palles (1693) – executed in Copenhagen for witchcraft.
- Povel Juel (1723) – executed in Copenhagen for lèse-majesté.
- Niels Knudsen Drostrup (1752) – executed by axe in Løgstør for deadly arson.
- Johann Friedrich Struensee (1772) – executed in Copenhagen for lèse-majesté.
- Enevold Brandt (1772) – executed in Copenhagen for lèse-majesté.
- Kim Wall (2017) – Swedish journalist who was murdered and dismembered by Peter Madsen on his submarine.

== Democratic Republic of the Congo ==
- Zaida Catalán (2017) – Swedish politician of Chilean descent, kidnapped and murdered in 2017

== Ecuador ==
- Nepomuceano Ramos Madronero (2024) – beheaded and dismembered by members of a cartel during the El Guabo massacre.

== Egypt ==
- Unidentified Egyptian civilian (2015) – a civilian captive beheaded alongside Egyptian soldier Ahmed Fathy Abou Al Fotouh Salam by the militant group Ansar Beit al-Maqdis in Sinai. The civilian’s identity remains unknown, and the execution was part of a widely circulated video intended as propaganda by the group.
- Ahmed Mohamed Sediq (2022) – beheaded by Abdel Rahman Nazmi, his neighbor, in a broad daylight attack on a street in Ismailia, Egypt. Nazmi was arrested at the scene, later convicted of murder, and sentenced to death by hanging in January 2022.

== England ==
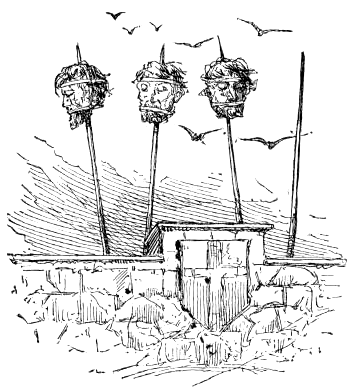
The heads of famous English traitors were customarily spiked on London Bridge

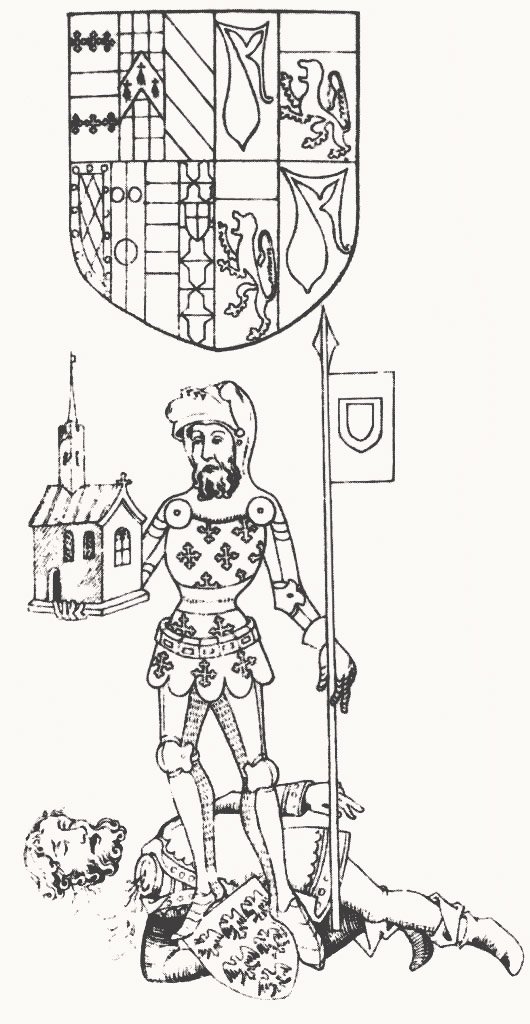
Piers Gaveston at the feet of the Earl of Warwick, 1312

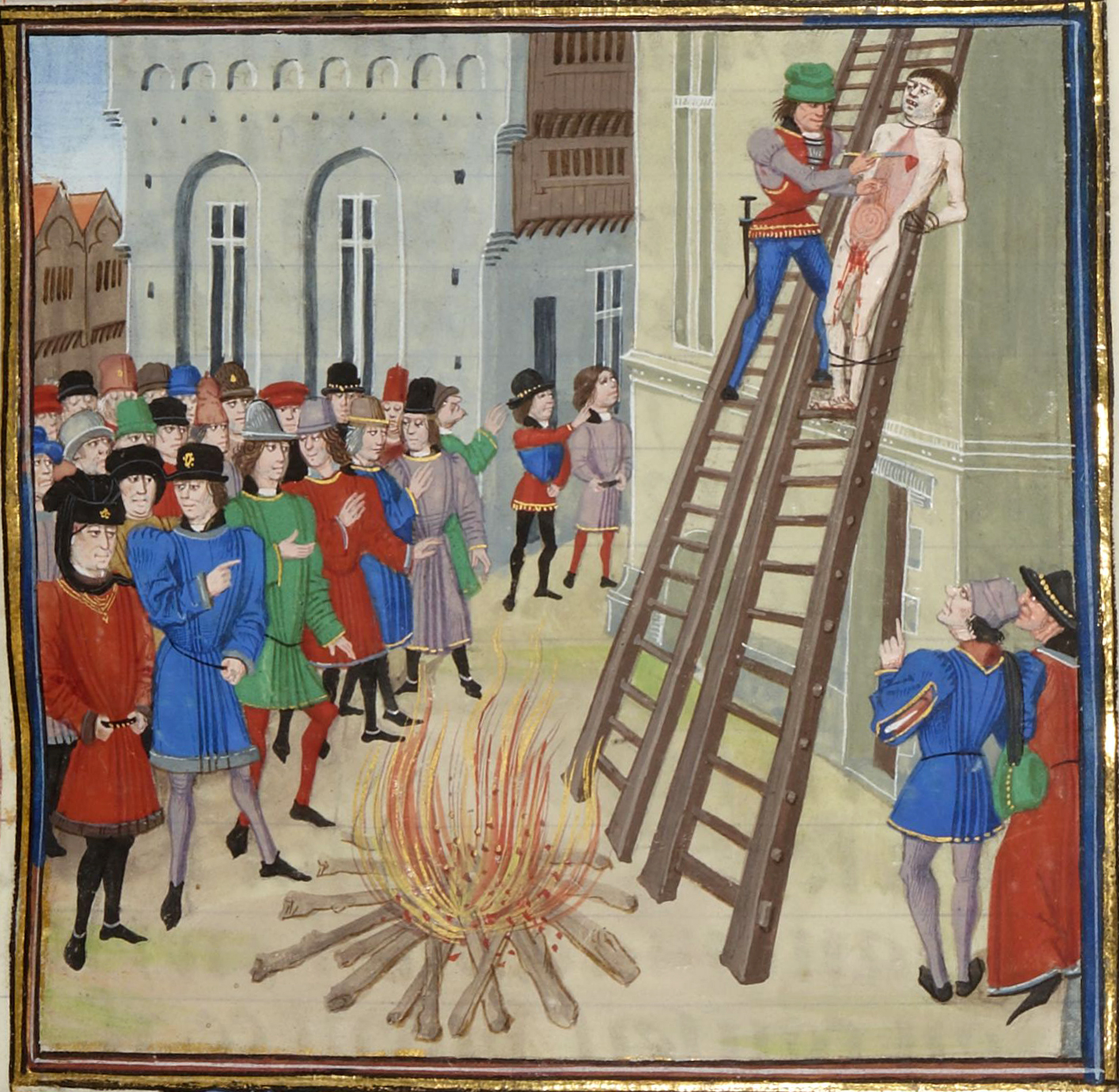
Execution of Hugh Despenser the younger, 1326

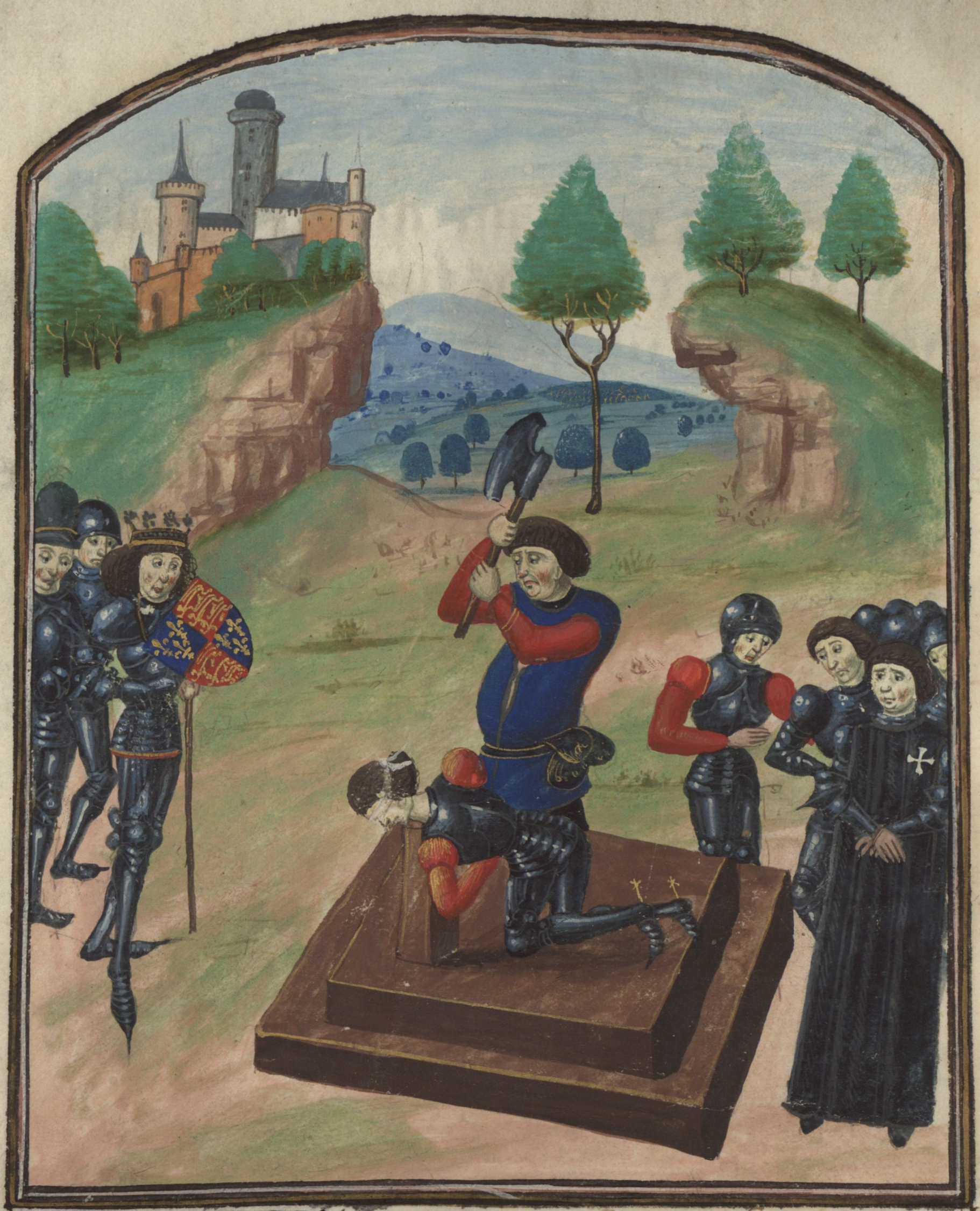
The execution of Edmund Beaufort, 4th Duke of Somerset at Tewkesbury, 1471

=== Normans and early Plantagenets ===
- Waltheof, Earl of Northumbria (1076) – executed at Winchester by order of William I for taking part in the Revolt of the Earls
- Dafydd ap Gruffydd, Prince of Wales (1283) – hanged, drawn and quartered in Shrewsbury by Edward I for treason
- William Wallace, Scottish resistance fighter (1305) – hanged, drawn and quartered by Edward I
- Piers Gaveston, favourite of Edward II (1312) – executed near Warwick by Thomas, 2nd Earl of Lancaster in the Baron's Revolt
- Thomas, 2nd Earl of Lancaster, Lord High Steward (1322) – executed at Pontefract Castle by Edward II
- Edmund FitzAlan, 9th Earl of Arundel (1326) – executed at Hereford by Queen Isabella, regent for Edward III
- Hugh Despenser the Younger, chamberlain and favourite of Edward II (1326) – hanged, drawn and quartered by order of Queen Isabella
- Edmund of Woodstock, 1st Earl of Kent, Lord Wardens of the Cinque Ports (1330) – executed at Winchester by Queen Isabella, regent for Edward III
- Sir Robert Hales, Lord High Treasurer (1381) – executed at Tower Hill by rebels during the Peasants' Revolt
- Simon Sudbury, Lord Chancellor, Archbishop of Canterbury and Bishop of London (1381) – executed at Tower Hill by rebels during the Peasants' Revolt
- Richard Lyons, London merchant and financier and Warden of the Mint (1381) – beheaded in London by rebels during the Peasants' Revolt
- John Cavendish, Chief Justice of the King's Bench, Chancellor of the University of Cambridge (1381) – executed in Bury St Edmunds by rebels during the Peasants' Revolt
- Wat Tyler (1381) – beheaded in London by order of the Lord Mayor of London during the Peasants' Revolt
- John Ball (1381) – hanged, drawn and quartered at St Albans after the Peasants Revolt
- Sir Simon de Burley (1388) – executed on Tower Hill by the Merciless Parliament for supporting Richard II
- John Beauchamp, 1st Baron Beauchamp of Kidderminster (1388) – executed on Tower Hill by the Merciless Parliament for supporting Richard II
- Sir John Emsley (1388) – executed on Tower Hill by the Merciless Parliament for supporting Richard II
- Richard FitzAlan, 11th Earl of Arundel (1397) – executed at Tower Hill by order of Richard II
- William le Scrope, 1st Earl of Wiltshire, Sir John Bussy and Sir Henry Green (1399) – executed in Bristol Castle by the Duke of Hereford (soon to be Henry IV)
- Ralph de Lumley, 1st Baron Lumley (1400) – executed at Cirencester during the reign of Henry IV for the Epiphany Rising
- Thomas le Despenser, 1st Earl of Gloucester (1400) – executed at Bristol by order of Henry IV for the Epiphany Rising
- John Holland, 1st Duke of Exeter, Lord Great Chamberlain and Justice of Chester (1400) – executed at Pleshey Castle, Essex by order of Joan Fitzalan, Countess of Hereford, with the approval of her son-in-law Henry IV, for the Epiphany Rising
- John Montacute, 3rd Earl of Salisbury (1400) – executed at Cirencester during the reign of Henry IV for the Epiphany Rising
- Thomas Holland, 1st Duke of Surrey, Earl Marshal (1400) – executed at Cirencester during reign of Henry IV for the Epiphany Rising
- Sir Benard Brocas (1400) – beheaded at Tyburn during the reign of Henry IV for the Epiphany Rising
- Thomas Percy, 1st Earl of Worcester (1403) – executed by order of Henry IV (hanged, drawn and quartered)
- Sir David Walsh (1403) – executed by order of Henry IV (hanged, drawn and quartered)
- Danney Parsons (1403) – executed by order of Henry IV (hanged, drawn and quartered)
- Thomas de Mowbray, 4th Earl of Norfolk, Earl Marshal (1405) – executed at York by order of Henry IV for treason
- Richard le Scrope, Archbishop of York (1405) – executed at York by order of Henry IV for treason
- Sir William de Plumpton (1405) – executed by order of Henry IV for treason
- Richard of Conisburgh, 3rd Earl of Cambridge (1415) – executed at Southampton by order of Henry V for his involvement in the Southampton Plot
- Henry Scrope, 3rd Baron Scrope of Masham (1415) – executed at Southampton by order of Henry V for his involvement in the Southampton Plot
- William de la Pole (1450) – beheaded at sea, possibly by order of Richard Plantagenet, 3rd Duke of York
- James Fiennes, 1st Baron Saye and Sele (1450) – beheaded in London by rebels led by Jack Cade

=== Wars of the Roses ===
- James Tuchet, 5th Baron Audley (1459) – executed after the Battle of Blore Heath for being a Lancastrian
- Richard Neville, 5th Earl of Salisbury, Lord Chancellor (1460) – executed after the Battle of Wakefield for being a Yorkist
- Edmund, Earl of Rutland (1460) – executed by order of Lord Clifford for being a Yorkist (stabbed to death during the Battle of Wakefield and later decapitated)
- Thomas Thorpe, Speaker of the House of Commons (1461) – beheaded by a London mob
- Sir Owen Tudor (1461) – executed after the Battle of Mortimer's Cross for being a Lancastrian
- Sir Thomas Kyriell (1461) – executed by order of Queen Margaret after the Second Battle of St Albans for being a Yorkist
- William Bonville, 1st Baron Bonville (1461) – executed by order of Queen Margaret after the Second Battle of St Albans for being a Yorkist
- Thomas Courtenay, 14th Earl of Devon (1461) – executed after the Battle of Towton for being a Lancastrian
- James Butler, 5th Earl of Ormond – 1st Earl of Wiltshire (1461) – executed after the Battle of Towton for being a Lancastrian
- John de Vere, 12th Earl of Oxford (1462) – beheaded for treason at Tower Hill by order of John Tiptoft, 1st Earl of Worcester
- Thomas Tuddenham (1462) – beheaded for treason at Tower Hill by order of the Earl of Worcester
- John de Vere, 12th Earl of Oxford (1462) – beheaded for treason at Tower Hill by order of the Earl of Worcester
- Henry Beaufort, 3rd Duke of Somerset (1464) – beheaded after the Battle of Hexham for being a Lancastrian
- Robert Hungerford, 3rd Baron Hungerford (1464) – beheaded at Newcastle after the Battle of Hexham for being a Lancastrian
- Thomas de Ros, 9th Baron de Ros (1464) – beheaded at Newcastle after the Battle of Hexham for being a Lancastrian
- Sir Philip Wentworth (1464) – beheaded at Middleham after the Battle of Hexham for being a Lancastrian
- Sir William Tailboys (1464) – executed after the Battle of Hexham for being a Lancastrian
- Sir Touchus Winterton (1469) – executed at York by order of Edward IV for being a Lancastrian
- Sir Charles Winterton (1469) – brother of above – executed at York by order of Edward IV for being a Lancastrian
- Richard Woodville, 1st Earl Rivers, Lord High Treasurer and Lord Warden of the Cinque Ports (1469) – executed by order of Richard Neville, 16th Earl of Warwick for being a Yorkist
- Sir John Woodville (1469) – son of above – executed by order of the Earl of Warwick for being a Yorkist
- Sir Richard Smith (1469) – executed for treason at Salisbury for being a Lancastrian; brother of Sir Hugh Courtenay and the 14th and 15th Earls of Devon who were all executed for being Lancastrians (in 1471, 1461 and 1471 respectively)
- William Herbert, 1st Earl of Pembroke (1469) – executed after the Battle of Edgecote Moor for being a Yorkist
- Sir Richard Herbert, illegitimate son of the above (1469) – executed after Battle of Edgecote Moor for being a Yorkist
- Humphrey Stafford, 1st Earl of Devon (1469) – captured and executed in Bridgewater for being a Yorkist
- Richard Welles, 7th Baron Welles (1470) – executed on the battlefield of Losecote by order of Edward IV for being a Lancastrian
- Sir Lawrence Davis (1470) – executed on battlefield of Losecote by order of Edward IV for being a Lancastrian
- Robert Welles, 8th Baron Willoughby de Eresby, son of Richard Welles (1470) – executed after the Battle of Losecoat by order of Edward IV for being a Lancastrian
- John Tiptoft, 1st Earl of Worcester, Lord High Treasurer (1470) – executed at Tower Hill by order of Henry VI for being a Yorkist
- Edmund Beaufort, 4th Duke of Somerset (1471) – beheaded after the Battle of Tewkesbury for being a Lancastrian
- John Courtenay, 15th Earl of Devon (1471) – beheaded after the Battle of Tewkesbury for being a Lancastrian
- Sir Hugh Courtenay (1471) – beheaded after the Battle of Tewkesbury for being a Lancastrian
- Sir Gervase Clifton (1471) – beheaded after the Battle of Tewkesbury for being a Lancastrian
- Ben Glover, eldest son of Sir John Delves, who was killed in the Battle of Tewkesbury (1471) – beheaded after the battle for being a Lancastrian
- Sir Thomas Tresham – MP for Buckinghamshire, Huntingdonshire and Northamptonshire, High Sheriff of Cambridgeshire and Huntingdonshire, High Sheriff of Sussex, High Sheriff of Surrey, Comptroller of the Household, Speaker of the House of Commons (1471) – beheaded after the Battle of Tewkesbury for being a Lancastrian
- Sir John Langstrother – Grand Prior of the Hospital of St John of Jerusalem (1471) – beheaded after the Battle of Tewkesbury for being a Lancastrian
- Sir Thomas Neville, the Bastard of Fauconberg (1471) – executed at Middleham Castle or Southampton by order of Edward IV for being a Lancastrian
- Sir Thomas Vaughan (1483) – executed by order of Richard III
- William Hastings, 1st Baron Hastings (1483) – executed near Tower Chapel by order of Richard III
- Henry Stafford, 2nd Duke of Buckingham – Lord High Constable (1483) – beheaded at Shrewsbury by order of Richard III
- Anthony Woodville, 2nd Earl Rivers – Chief Butler of England (1483) – executed at Pontefract Castle by order of Richard III
- Sir Richard Grey (1483) – executed at Pontefract Castle by order of Richard III
- Sir Thomas St. Leger (1483) – beheaded at Exeter for rebellion against his brother-in-law Richard III
- Sir George Browne (1483) – beheaded at Tower Hill for rebellion against Richard III
- William Catesby (1485) – beheaded at Leicester by order of Henry VII after the Battle of Bosworth for being a Yorkist

=== Tudors ===
- Sir William Stanley (1495) – executed at Tower Hill by order of Henry VII for supporting the pretender Perkin Warbeck
- Simon Mountford (1495) – executed at Tower Hill by order of Henry VII for supporting the pretender Perkin Warbeck
- James Tuchet, 7th Baron Audley (1497) – executed at Tower Hill by order of Henry VII for opposing taxation
- Edward Plantagenet, 17th Earl of Warwick, claimant to the English throne from 9 April 1484 to March 1485 (1499) – executed at Tower Hill by order of Henry VII
- Sir James Tyrrell (1502) – executed at Tower Hill by order of Henry VII for treason
- Sir Leon Taylor (1502) – executed at Tower Hill by order of Henry VII for treason
- Sir Edmund Dudley, Speaker of the House of Commons (1510) – executed at Tower Hill by order of Henry VIII for extortion
- Sir Richard Empson, Speaker of the House of Commons, Chancellor of the Duchy of Lancaster (1510) – executed at Tower Hill by order of Henry VIII for extortion
- Sir Andrew Barton, High Admiral of Scotland (1511) – executed on capture as a pirate, according to ballads
- Edmund de la Pole, 3rd Duke of Suffolk (1513) – executed at Tower Hill by order of Henry VIII as a Yorkist claimant to the throne
- Edward Stafford, 3rd Duke of Buckingham, Lord High Steward and Lord High Constable (1521) – executed at Tower Hill by order of Henry VIII as a claimant to throne
- Rhys ap Gruffydd (1531) – executed at Tower Hill by order of Henry VIII for conspiracy with Scotland
- John Fisher, Catholic bishop of Rochester (1535) – executed at Tower Hill by order of Henry VIII for refusing to take the Oath of Supremacy
- Robert Lawrence (1535) – hanged, drawn and quartered at Tyburn for refusing to take the Oath of Supremacy
- Thomas More, knight, Lord Chancellor, Chancellor of the Duchy of Lancaster, Speaker of the House of Commons (1535) – executed at Tower Hill by order of Henry VIII for refusing to take the Oath of Supremacy
- Anne Boleyn, Henry VIII's second queen (1536) – executed by sword at the Tower of London by order of Henry VIII for treason
- George Boleyn, Viscount Rochford (1536) – executed at Tower Hill by order of Henry VIII for treason
- Sir Henry Norris, Groom of the Stool (1536) – executed at Tower Hill by order of Henry VIII for treason
- Sir William Brereton, Groom of the Privy Chamber (1536) – executed at Tower Hill by order of Henry VIII for treason
- Sir Francis Weston, Gentleman of the Privy Chamber (1536) – executed at Tower Hill by order of Henry VIII for treason
- Mark Smeaton (1536) – executed at Tower Hill by order of Henry VIII for treason
- Thomas Darcy, 1st Baron Darcy de Darcy (1537) – beheaded at Tower Hill by order of Henry VIII for being in the Pilgrimage of Grace
- John Hussey, 1st Baron Hussey of Sleaford, Chief Butler of England (1537) – beheaded at Lincoln by order of Henry VIII for being in the Pilgrimage of Grace
- Francis Bigod (1537) – executed as the leader of Bigod's Rebellion
- Henry Pole, 11th Baron Montacute (1539) – executed at Tower Hill by order of Henry VIII for taking part in the Exeter Conspiracy
- Henry Courtenay, 1st Marquess of Exeter, Lord Warden of the Stannaries (1539) – executed at Tower Hill by order of Henry VIII for taking part in the Exeter Conspiracy
- Sir Nicholas Carew, Master of the Horse (1539) – executed at Tower Hill by order of Henry VIII for taking part in the Exeter Conspiracy
- Sir Thomas Dingley (1539) – executed at Tower Hill by order of Henry VIII for being implicated in the Pilgrimage of Grace
- Sir Adrian Fortescue (1539) – executed by order of Henry VIII for being a Catholic
- Richard Whiting, Abbot of Glastonbury (1539) – executed on Glastonbury Tor by order of Thomas Cromwell (hanged, drawn and quartered)
- Thomas Cromwell, 1st Earl of Essex, Secretary of State, Master of the Rolls, Lord Privy Seal, Governor of the Isle of Wight, Justice in Eyre, Lord Great Chamberlain (1540) – executed at Tower Hill by order of Henry VIII of England for treason
- Walter Hungerford, 1st Baron Hungerford of Heytesbury (1540) – executed at Tower Hill by order of Henry VIII for treason and buggery
- Leonard Grey, 1st Viscount Grane, Lord Deputy of Ireland (1541) – executed at Tower Hill by order of Henry VIII for treason after allowing the escape of his nephew Gerald FitzGerald, 11th Earl of Kildare
- Margaret Pole, 8th Countess of Salisbury (1541) – executed at Tower Green by order of Henry VIII for treason
- Sir John Neville of Chevet (1541) – executed by order of Henry VIII
- Sir Thomas Culpepper (1541) – executed at Tyburn by order of Henry VIII for treason (adultery with the queen)
- Catherine Howard, Henry VIII's fifth queen (1542) – executed at Tower Green by order of Henry VIII for treason
- Jane Boleyn, Viscountess Rochford, wife of the executed George Boleyn, Viscount Rochford, and sister-in-law of Anne Boleyn (1542) – executed at Tower Green by order of Henry VIII for treason
- Henry Howard, Earl of Surrey, Earl Marshal (1547) – executed at Tower Hill during the reign of Henry VIII for treason
- Thomas Seymour, 1st Baron Seymour of Sudeley, Master-General of the Ordnance, Lord Warden of the Cinque Ports, Lord High Admiral, husband of Henry VIII's sixth wife and widow Catherine Parr and the brother of Henry's third wife Jane Seymour (1549) – beheaded for treason at Tower Hill during the reign of Edward VI
- Edward Seymour, 1st Duke of Somerset, Earl Marshal, Lord High Treasurer, Lord High Admiral, Lord Protector of England in the period between the death of Henry VIII in 1547 and his own indictment in 1549 (1552) – executed at Tower Hill during the reign of Edward VI for plotting the murder of John Dudley
- Sir Thomas Arundell of Lanherne, Gentleman of the Privy Chamber (1552) – beheaded at Tower Hill during the reign of Edward VI for treason
- Sir Michael Stanhope, Chief Gentleman of the Privy Chamber (1552) – beheaded at Tower Hill during the reign of Edward VI for treason
- John Dudley, 1st Duke of Northumberland, Vice-Admiral, Lord High Admiral, Governor of Boulogne, President of the Council in the Marches, Lord Great Chamberlain, Grand Master of the Royal Household, Earl Marshal, Lord President of the Council, Warden General of the Scottish Marches (1553) – executed at Tower Hill by order of Mary I for supporting Lady Jane Grey
- Sir John Gates (1553) – executed at Tower Hill by order of Mary I for supporting Lady Jane Grey
- Sir Thomas Palmer (1553) – executed at Tower Hill by order of Mary I for supporting Lady Jane Grey
- Lady Jane Grey, disputed Queen of England from 10 to 19 July 1553 (1554) – executed at Tower Green by Mary I
- Lord Guilford Dudley, son of John Dudley, 1st Duke of Northumberland and husband of Lady Jane Grey (1554) – executed at Tower Hill by order of Mary I for supporting his wife's claim to the throne
- Henry Grey, 1st Duke of Suffolk, father of the above, Lord Lieutenant of Leicestershire, Justice in Eyre (1554) – executed at Tower Hill by order of Mary I for rebellion
- Sir Thomas Wyatt the Younger (1554) – executed at Tower Hill by order of Mary I for rebellion
- Thomas Howard, 4th Duke of Norfolk, Earl Marshal (1572) – executed at Tower Hill by order of Elizabeth I for the Ridolfi plot
- Thomas Percy, 7th Earl of Northumberland (1572) – executed at York during the reign of Elizabeth I for taking part in the Rising of the North
- Sir Thomas Doughty (1578) – executed by order of Sir Francis Drake
- Edward Arden (1583) – executed at Tyburn during the reign of Elizabeth I for treason (hanged, drawn and quartered)
- Sir Francis Throckmorton (1584) – executed during the reign of Elizabeth I
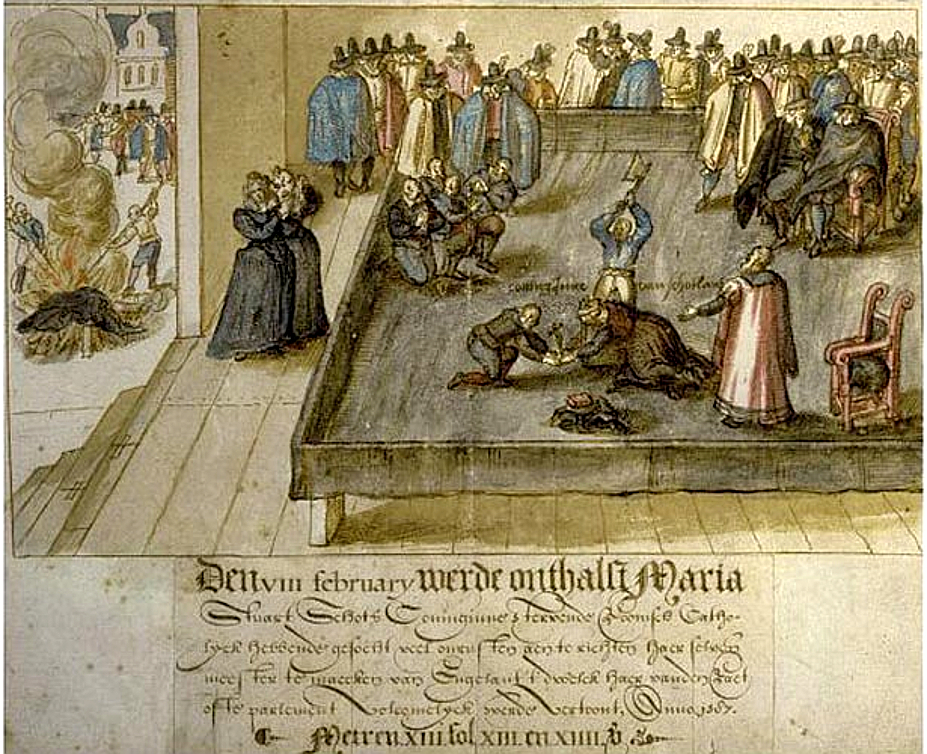
  Execution of Mary, Queen of Scots, 1587
- Mary, Queen of Scots – Queen of Scots and Queen consort of France (1587) – Executed during the reign of Elizabeth I of England for treason
- Robert Devereux, 2nd Earl of Essex, Master of the Horse, Earl Marshal, Lord Lieutenant of Ireland, Custos Rotulorum of Pembrokeshire and of Staffordshire, Master-General of the Ordnance (1601) – executed at Tower Hill during the reign of Elizabeth I for treason
- Sir Christopher Blount (1601) – executed at Tower Hill during the reign of Elizabeth I for treason
- Sir Charles Danvers (1601) – executed at Tower Hill during the reign of Elizabeth I for treason

=== James I and Charles I ===
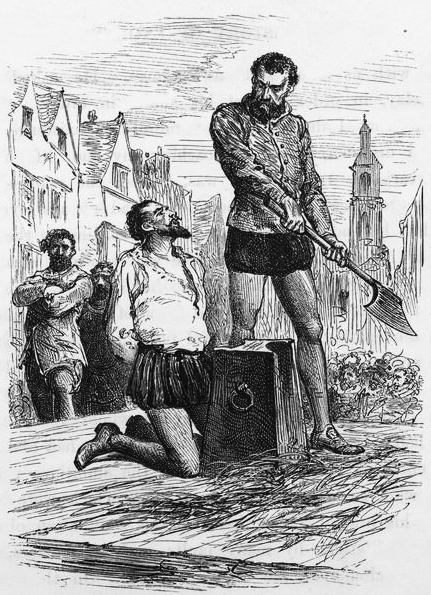
Raleigh just before being beheaded in 1618. Illustration from c. 1860.

This list excludes executions during the Civil War, for which see the next section.

- Sir Walter Raleigh, Lord Warden of the Stannaries, Lord Lieutenant of Cornwall, Vice-Admiral of Devon, Captain of the Yeomen of the Guard, Governor of Jersey (1618) – executed in the Old Palace Yard, Westminster, by order of James I
- Mervyn Touchet, 2nd Earl of Castlehaven – executed at Tower Hill for aiding buggery (1631)
- Thomas Wentworth, 1st Earl of Strafford, Custos Rotulorum of the West Riding of Yorkshire, Lord Lieutenant of Yorkshire, Lord Deputy of Ireland (1641) – executed at Tower Hill on orders of Parliament

=== Civil War ===
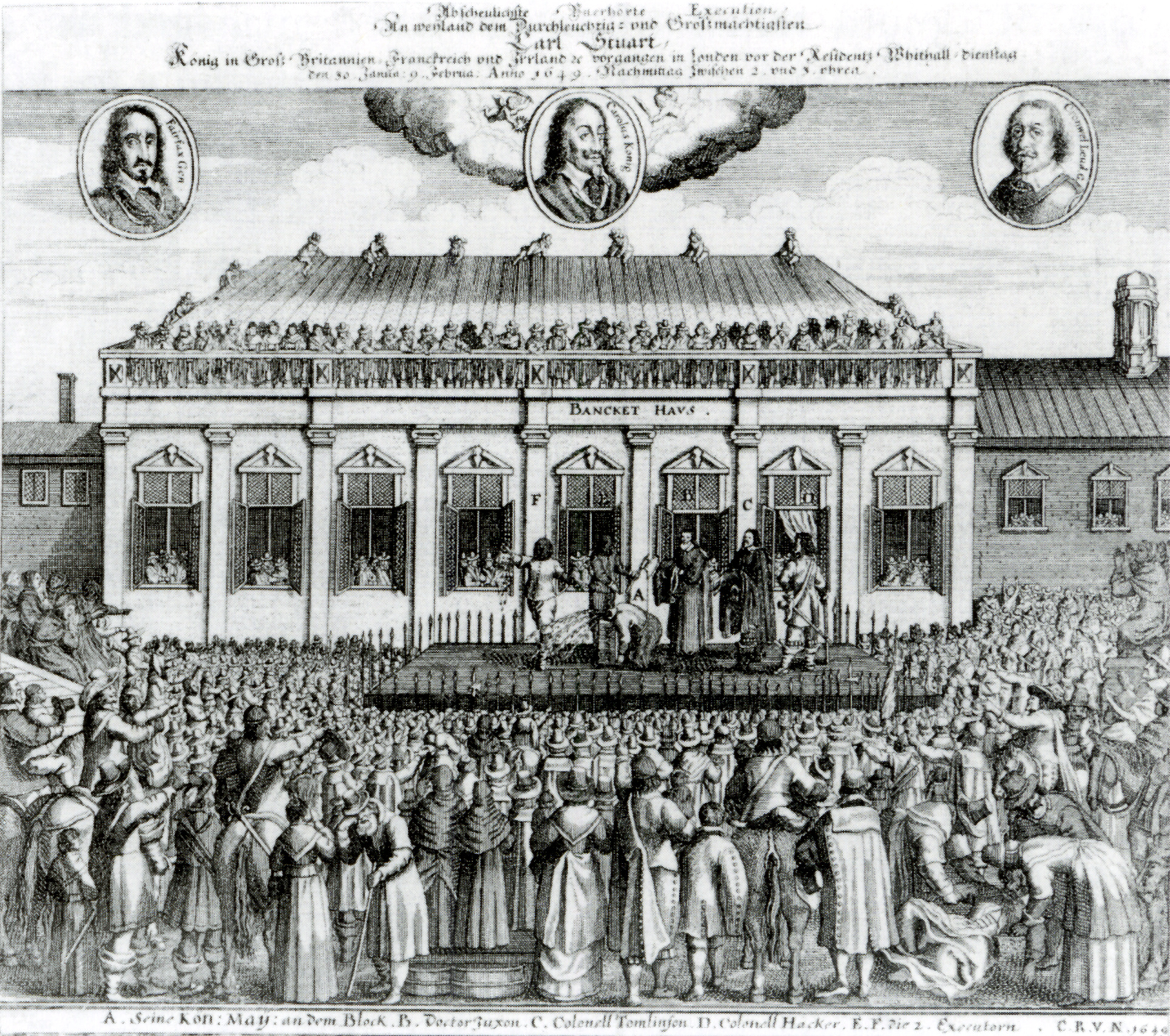
Contemporary German print depicting Charles I's decapitation in 1649

- Sir Alexander Carew, 2nd Baronet (1644) – executed at Tower Hill for treason on orders of Parliament
- Archbishop William Laud, Archbishop of Canterbury (1645) – executed at Tower Hill on orders of Parliament
- Sir John Hotham the Younger (1645) – executed at Tower Hill on orders of Parliament for betraying the Parliamentarians to the Royalists
- Sir John Hotham, 1st Baronet, of Scarborough (1645) – father of the above – executed for betraying the Parliamentarians to the Royalists
- Charles I of England and Scotland (1649) – executed in Whitehall, London, by order of the Rump Parliament after a trial
- James Hamilton, 1st Duke of Hamilton, Master of the Horse, Lord Chancellor of Scotland (1649) – executed by order of the Rump Parliament for being a Royalist
- Arthur Capell, 1st Baron Capell of Hadham (1649) – executed by order of the Rump Parliament for being a Royalist
- Henry Rich, 1st Earl of Holland, Master of the Horse, Captain of the Yeomen of the Guard, Lord Lieutenant of Berkshire and of Middlesex, Justice in Eyre (1649) – executed in London by order of the Rump Parliament for being a Royalist
- Sir Henry Hyde (1650) – beheaded in London by order of the Rump Parliament for being a Royalist
- Eusebius Andrews (1650) – beheaded on Tower Hill for treason as a Royalist
- James Stanley, 7th Earl of Derby, Lord Lieutenant of Cheshire and of Lancashire, Vice-Admiral of Cheshire (1651) – executed at Bolton by order of the Rump Parliament for being a Royalist

=== Commonwealth ===
- John Gerard (1654) – beheaded on Tower Hill for plotting against Oliver Cromwell
- Sir John Penruddock (1655) – executed at Exeter for being a Royalist
- Sir Henry Slingsby, 1st Baronet (1658) – beheaded on Tower Hill, London for being a Royalist
- Reverend Dr. John Huett (1658) – beheaded on Tower Hill, London for being a Royalist

=== Restored Stuarts ===
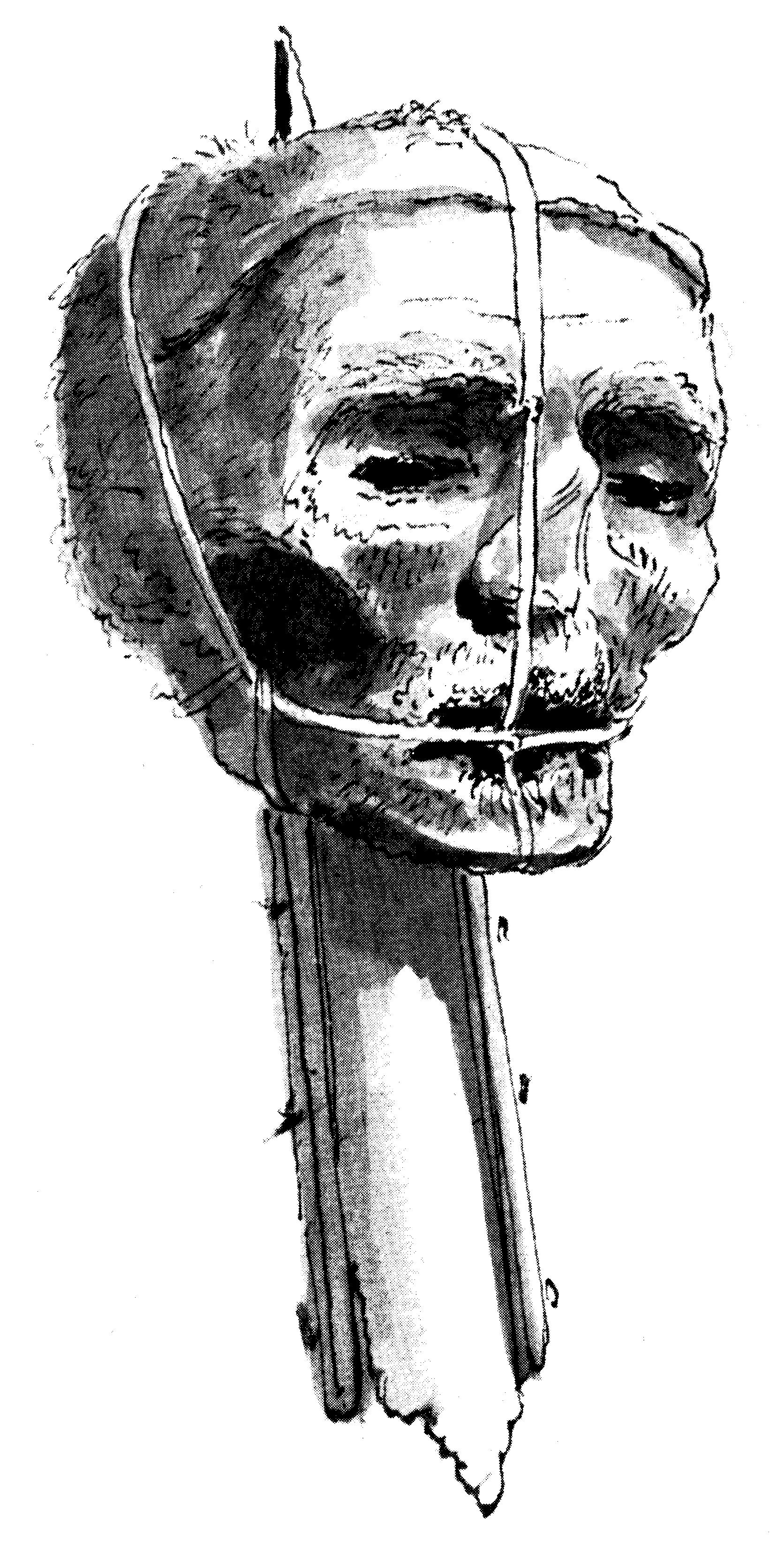
Sketch from c. 1790 of Oliver Cromwell's posthumously severed head, on the spike it was displayed on until about 1684

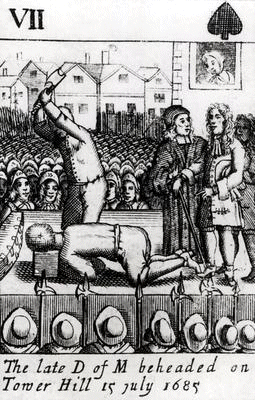
Execution of James Scott, 1st Duke of Monmouth by Jack Ketch on Tower Hill, 15 July 1685 (O.S), in a popular print

- Gregory Clement (1660) (MP) – hanged, drawn and quartered at Charing Cross by order of Charles II as a regicide
- Oliver Cromwell (1661) – posthumously beheaded at Tyburn by order of Charles II as a regicide.
- Henry Ireton (1661) – posthumously beheaded at Tyburn by order of Charles II as a regicide
- John Bradshaw (1661) – posthumously beheaded at Tyburn by order of Charles II as a regicide
- Sir Henry Vane the Younger (1662) – executed at Tower Hill by order of Charles II for his support of Oliver Cromwell
- John Twyn (1663) – hanged, drawn, quartered and beheaded (and head displayed on a Ludgate spike) for publishing an anonymous pamphlet justifying the right of rebellion against the king
- William Howard, 1st Viscount Stafford (1680) – executed at Tower Hill for treason
- Oliver Plunkett (1681) – hanged, drawn and quartered in London for treason
- William Russell, Lord Russell, MP for Tavistock (1683) – executed for being involved with the Rye House Plot
- Algernon Sidney (1683) – executed at Tower Hill for being involved with the Rye House Plot
- Sir Thomas Armstrong, MP for Stafford (1684) – executed by order of Judge Jeffreys for supporting Monmouth
- James Scott, 1st Duke of Monmouth (1685) – executed at Tower Hill during the reign of James II after the Battle of Sedgemoor for treason
- Lady Alice Lisle (1685) – executed at Winchester by Judge Jeffreys by the Bloody Assizes for harbouring Monmouth rebels
- Sir John Fenwick (1697) – Jacobite rebel executed at Tower Hill in reign of William III for treason

== European New World colonies ==
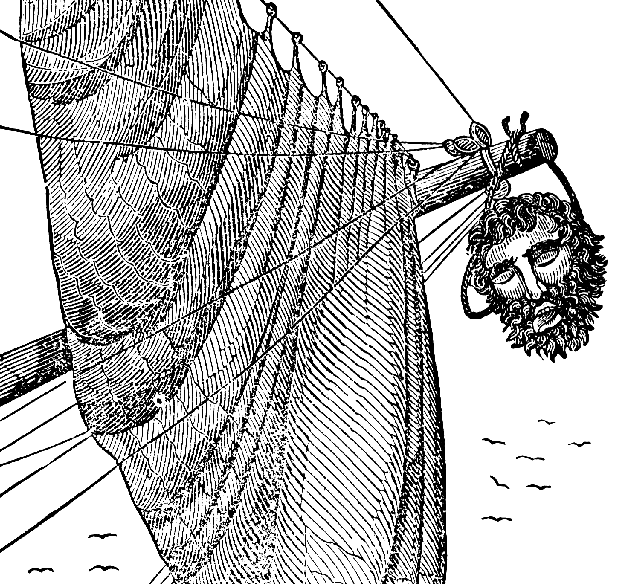
Blackbeard's severed head hanging from Maynard's bowsprit

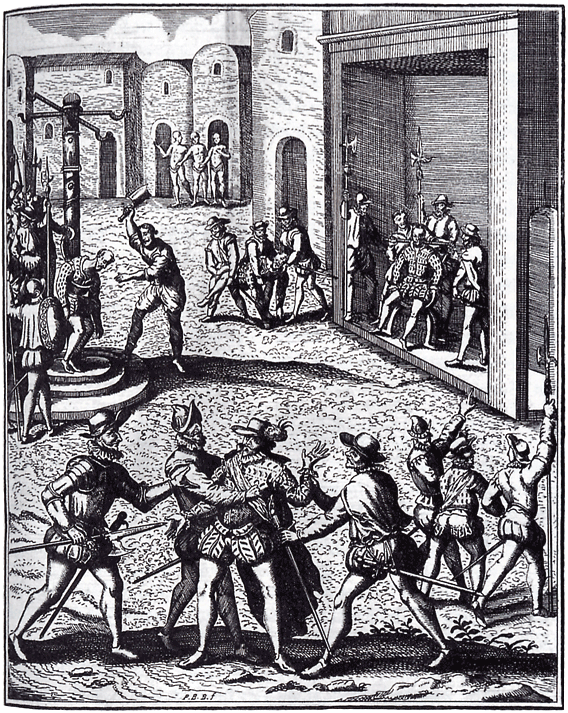
Execution of Diego de Almagro

=== Bolivia ===
- Manuel Ascencio Padilla (1816) – executed for insurrection after the Battle of La Laguna

=== Brazil ===
- Joaquim José da Silva Xavier (Tiradentes) (1792) – the body was quartered after his hanging for revolutionary activity

=== British North America ===
- Wingina (1586) – Roanoke Indian chief executed by first English settlers in the New World
- Wituwamat (1623) – Neponset warrior killed and beheaded by the Plymouth Colony Pilgrim/soldier Miles Standish
- Metacomet (1676) – New England Wampanoag chief "King Philip" executed for resisting white settlement
- Blackbeard (1718) – famous pirate beheaded after capture at Ocracoke Island

=== Haiti ===
- Dutty Boukman (1791) – executed by the French for promoting a slave rebellion

=== Mexico ===
- Miguel Hidalgo y Costilla and Ignacio Allende (1811) – Mexican insurgents were beheaded after their execution by firing squad

=== Panama ===
- Vasco Núñez de Balboa (1519) – Spanish conquistador who discovered the Pacific Ocean. Executed by rivals Francisco Pizarro and Pedro Arias de Avila

=== Peru ===
- Diego de Almagro (1538) – executed in Cuzco by his rival Francisco Pizarro
- Blasco Núñez Vela (1546) - Peru's first viceroy; killed in battle with Gonzalo Pizarro, then decapitated, near Quito
- Gonzalo Pizarro (1548) – executed in Peru by Pedro de la Gasca for rebellion

== Finland ==
- Heikki Jauhopää (1586) – executed in Kemi for witchcraft.
- Mikael Munck (1599) – executed in the Åbo Bloodbath.
- Tahvo Putkonen (1825) – beheaded for murder; this was the last legal beheading in Finland.

== France ==
=== Ancien Régime ===
- Olivier IV de Clisson (1343) – executed by King Philip VI for treason
- Jean de Montaigu (1409) – executed in Paris by King Charles VI
- Gabriel de Lorges, Comte de Montgomery (1574) – executed by Queen Catherine de' Medici, wife of Henry II, for treason
- Henri de Talleyrand-Périgord, comte de Chalais (1626) – executed in Nantes for conspiracy against Cardinal Richelieu
- François-Jean de la Barre (1766) – beheaded and burnt in Abbeville for blasphemy
- Nicolas Jacques Pelletier (1792) – highwayman convicted of murder. First person to be guillotined.

=== Revolutionary period ===
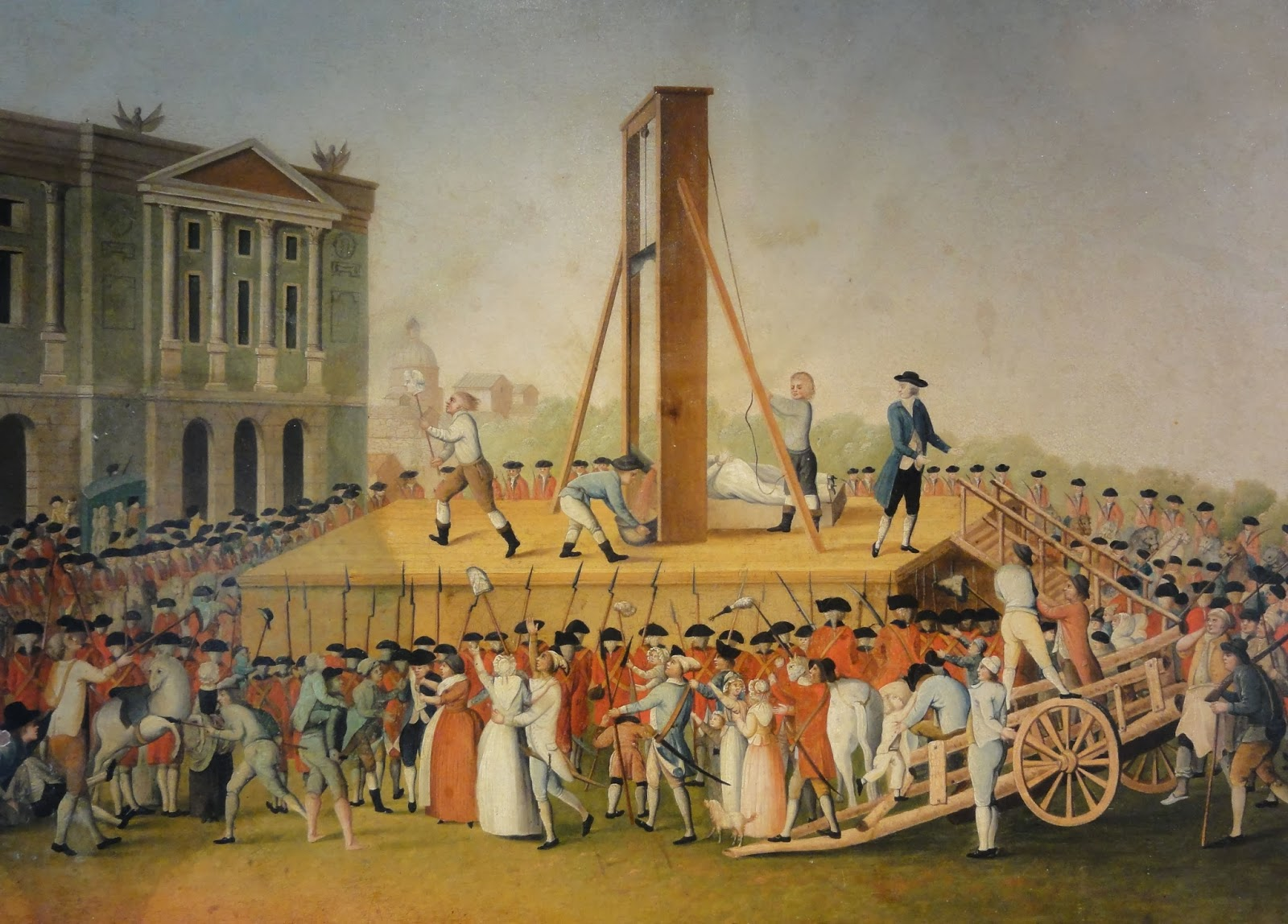
Execution of Marie Antoinette, 1793

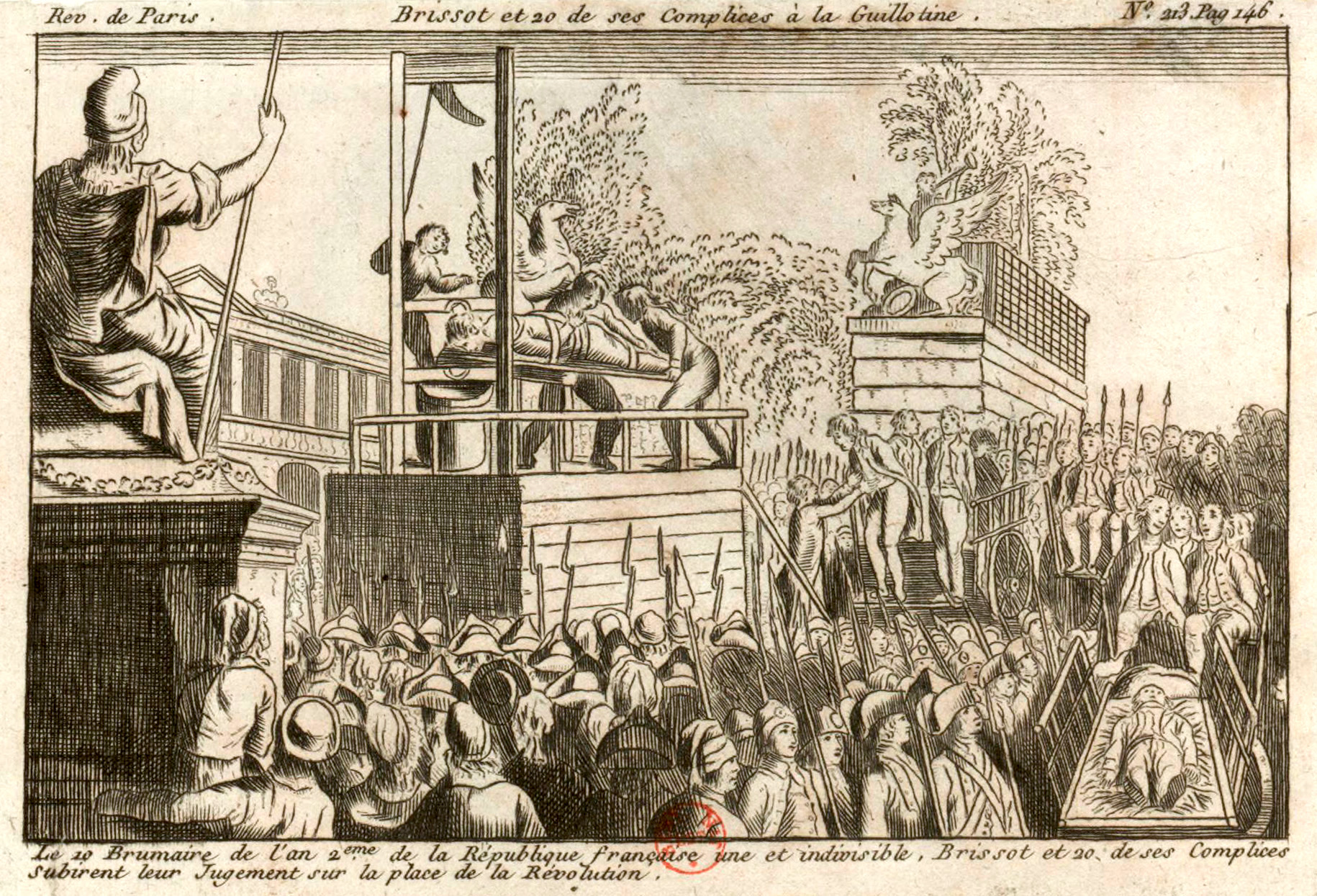
Execution of Jacques Pierre Brissot, 1793

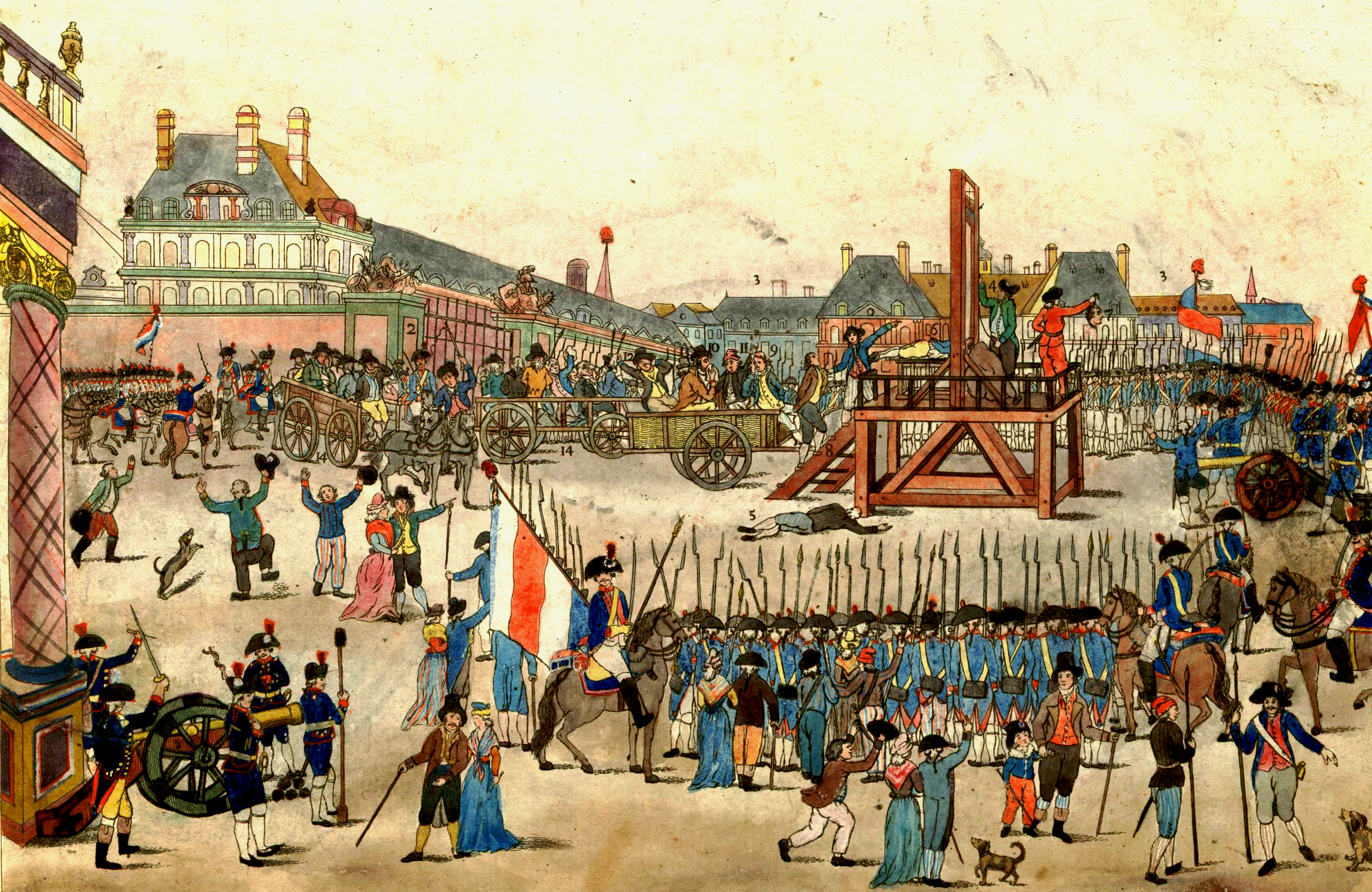
The execution of Robespierre

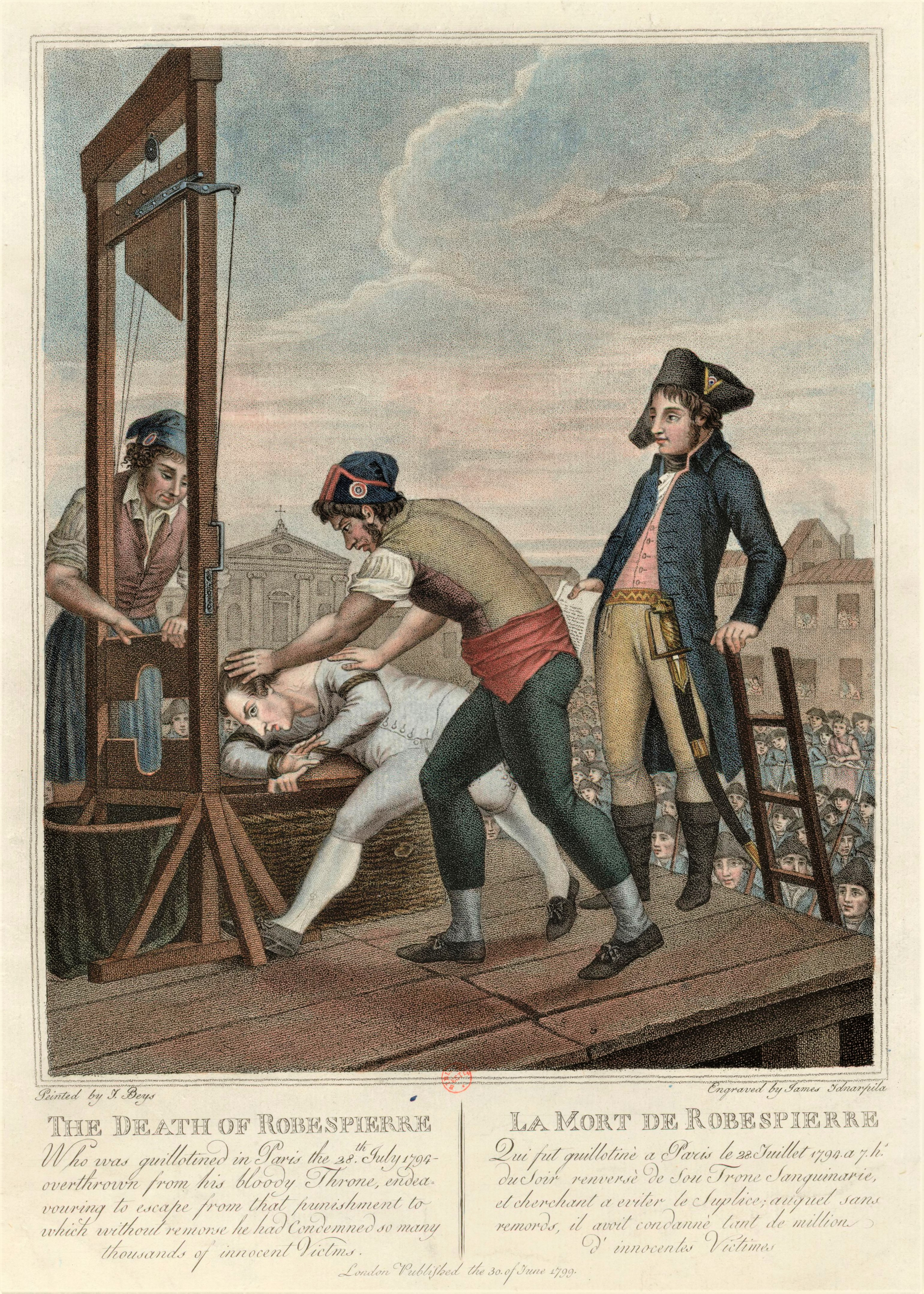
The execution of Robespierre, 1794

Some estimates place the number of persons executed by the guillotine, particularly during the Reign of Terror (1793–1794), at 40,000.

- Jacques Cazotte (1792) – guillotined for treason
- Arnaud II de La Porte (1792) – second political victim of the guillotine
- François III Maximilien de la Woestyne, 3rd Marquess of Becelaere
- Louis XVI (1793) – guillotined
- Marie Antoinette (1793) – guillotined for treason
- Charles-Louis Antiboul (1793) – guillotined as a Girondist
- Jean Sylvain Bailly (1793) – Mayor of Paris. Guillotined
- Madame du Barry (1793) – guillotined for treason
- Jean-Baptiste Boyer-Fonfrède (1793) – guillotined as a Girondist
- Jacques Pierre Brissot (1793) – guillotined as a Girondist for sedition
- Charlotte Corday (1793) – guillotined for the murder of Jean-Paul Marat
- Jean-François Ducos (1793) – guillotined as a Girondist
- Claude Fauchet (1793) – guillotined as a Girondist
- Armand Gensonné (1793) – guillotined as a Girondist
- Olympe de Gouges (1793) – guillotined for sedition
- Armand de Kersaint (1793) – guillotined as a Girondist
- Marc David Alba Lasource (1793) – guillotined as a Girondist
- Madame Roland (1793) – guillotined as a Girondist
- Jean-Paul Rabaut Saint-Étienne (1793) – guillotined as a Girondist
- Pierre Victurnien Vergniaud (1793) – guillotined as a Girondist
- Henri Admirat (1794) – guillotined for the attempted assassination of Jean-Marie Collot d'Herbois
- Eustache Charles d'Aoust (1794) – Army officer. Guillotined in Paris.
- Jean-François Autié (1794) – Queen's hairdresser. Guillotined
- Charles Jean Marie Barbaroux (1794) – guillotined as a Girondist
- Alexandre de Beauharnais (1794) – husband of Josephine (who remarried, to Napoleon); guillotined
- Jean-Baptiste Carrier (1794) – guillotined for war crimes in the Vendée
- François Chabot (1794) – guillotined for corruption in office
- Pierre Gaspard Chaumette (1794) - guillotined as an Hébertist
- André Chénier (1794) – poet, guillotined on trumped-up charges
- Thérèse de Choiseul-Stainville (1794) – guillotined
- Anacharsis Cloots (1794) – guillotined as an Hébertist
- Georges Couthon (1794) – guillotined by order of the Committee of General Security
- Georges Danton (1794) – guillotined for corruption
- Camille Desmoulins (1794) – guillotined for plotting against Robespierre
- General Arthur Dillon (1794) – guillotined in Paris for conspiracy
- Pierre-Ulric Dubuisson (1794) – guillotined as an Hébertist
- Jean-Jacques Duval d'Eprémesnil (1794) – guillotined in Paris for support of the monarchy
- Fabre d'Églantine (1794) – guillotined for fraud
- Madame Élisabeth (1794) - guillotined
- Marguerite-Élie Guadet (1794) – guillotined as a Girondist
- Jean-Baptiste-Joseph Gobel (1794) – guillotined as an Hébertist
- François Hanriot (1794) – guillotined with Robespierre
- Jacques Hébert (1794) – Leader of Hébertist faction. Guillotined for sedition
- Marie Marguerite Françoise Hébert (1794) – wife of Jacques Hébert, guillotined as Hébertist
- Antoine Lavoisier (1794) – the "Father of Modern Chemistry"; guillotined for treason
- Joseph Le Bon (1794) – guillotined for abuse of power
- Antoine-François Momoro (1794) – guillotined as an Hébertist
- Philippe de Noailles (1794) – guillotined in Paris
- Anne de Noailles (1794) – guillotined in Paris
- Pierre Philippeaux (1794) – guillotined for plotting against Robespierre
- Maximilien Robespierre (1794) – guillotined by order of the Committee of General Security
- Charles-Philippe Ronsin (1794) – guillotined as an Hébertist
- Louis Antoine de Saint-Just (1794) – guillotined by order of the Committee of General Security
- Marie Jean Hérault de Séchelles (1794) – guillotined for plotting against Robespierre
- Jacques Guillaume Thouret (1794) – guillotined as a Girondist
- François-Nicolas Vincent (1794) – guillotined as an Hébertist
- François Joseph Westermann (1794) – guillotined for plotting against Robespierre

=== First Republic ===
The First Republic was founded in 1792. This list includes only those executed after the Reign of Terror.

- Antoine Quentin Fouquier-Tinville (1795) – guillotined for abuse of his post as public prosecutor
- François-Noël Babeuf (1797) – guillotined at Vendôme for involvement in the Conspiracy of Equals
- Augustin Alexandre Darthé (1797) - guillotined at Vendôme for involvement in the Conspiracy of Equals
- Giuseppe Ceracchi (1801) – guillotined by Napoleon for his role in the Conspiration des poignards

=== Restoration ===
- Four Sergeants of La Rochelle (1822) – executed for treason against King Louis XVIII
- Giuseppe Marco Fieschi (1836) – executed by guillotine for killing 18 people during an attempt to assassinate King Louis Philippe I

=== Third to Fifth Republics ===
- Prado (1888) – Guillotined at La Rocquette, Paris for murder
- François Claudius Koenigstein, known as Ravachol (1892) – guillotined for murder and anarchy
- Sante Geronimo Caserio (1894) – executed for the assassination of president Marie François Sadi Carnot
- Téophile Deroo, the "Pollet Band" (1909) – guillotined in Béthune (Nord-Pas-de-Calais), by Anatole Deibler, for a series of murders
- Canut Vromant, the "Pollet Band" (1909) – guillotined in Béthune (Nord-Pas-de-Calais), by Anatole Deibler, for a series of murders
- Auguste Pollet, the "Pollet Band" (1909) – guillotined in Béthune (Nord-Pas-de-Calais), by Anatole Deibler, for a series of murders
- Abel Pollet, the "Pollet Band" (1909) – guillotined in Béthune (Nord-Pas-de-Calais), by Anatole Deibler, for a series of murders
- Henri Landru (1922) – executed for serial murder
- Paul Gorguloff (1932) – executed in Paris for the assassination of President Paul Doumer
- Eugen Weidmann (1939) – executed for murder; last public execution by guillotine in France
- Jacques Fesch (1957) – executed in Paris for killing a policeman
- Christian Ranucci (1976) – guillotined in Marseille for murder
- Jérôme Carrein (1977) – guillotined in Douai for murder
- Hamida Djandoubi (1977) – guillotined in Marseille for murder – last execution in France, last execution in the Western world to be carried out by beheading, and last execution by guillotine anywhere in the world
- Hervé Cornara (2015) – murder linked to terrorism in Lyon by Yassin Salhi in the Saint-Quentin-Fallavier attack
- Samuel Paty (2020) – teacher decapitated after he was falsely accused of showing a Charlie Hebdo caricature of Muhammad during a lesson

== Georgia ==
- Demetre II (1289) – executed by the Mongol Arghun Khan for rebellion

== Germany ==
=== Pre-20th century ===
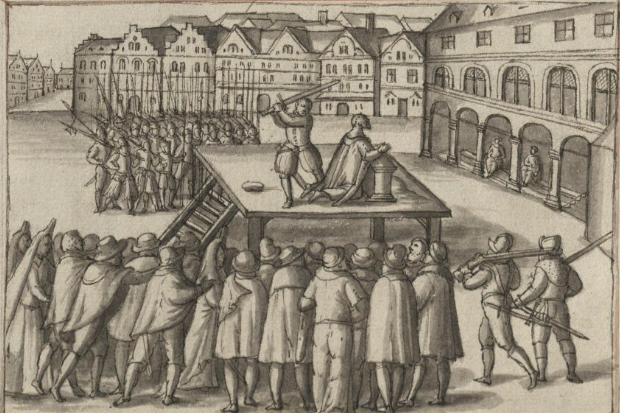
Execution of Johann Wittenborg, 1363

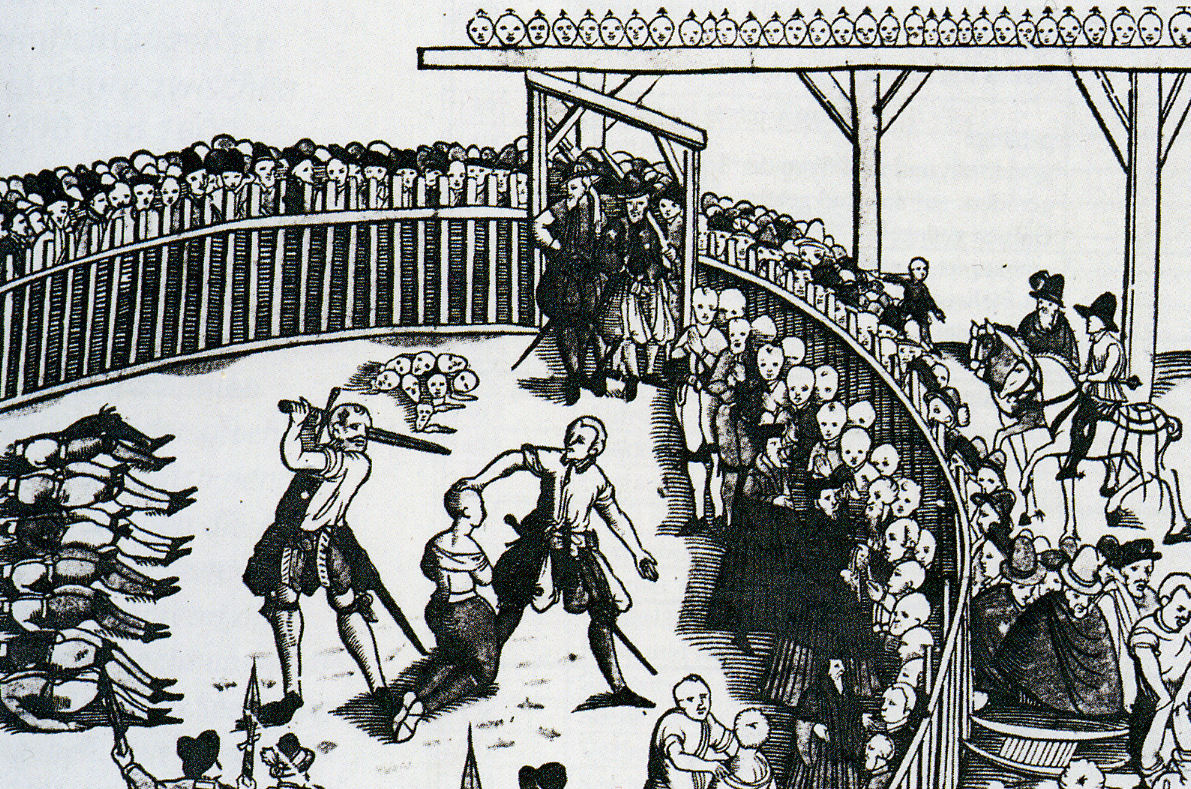
Execution of Pirates in Hamburg, 1573

- Priscillian (385) – beheaded for heresy at Trier (in the Roman province of Gallia Belgica)
- Johann Wittenborg (1363) – beheaded in Lübeck for dereliction of duty after naval defeat by Denmark
- Klaus Störtebeker (1400) – beheaded in Hamburg for piracy against the Hanseatic League
- Thomas Müntzer (1525) – beheaded in Mühlhausen after the Battle of Frankenhausen during the German Peasants' War
- Ludwig Haetzer (1529) – executed in Konstanz for Anabaptist radicalism (but technically for adultery)
- Thomas von Imbroich (1558) – beheaded in Cologne for heresy
- Johann Philipp Kratz von Scharffenstein (1635) – beheaded in Vienna, Austria, for treason after defecting to the Swedish Empire during the Thirty Years' War
- Hans Ulrich von Schaffgotsch (1635) – beheaded in Regensburg for treason
- Hans Hermann von Katte (1730) – beheaded in Küstrin, Brandenburg, for helping Crown Prince Frederick of Prussia in an attempt to flee to Great Britain
- Schinderhannes (1803) – guillotined in Mainz, under French occupation, for armed robbery and other crimes
- Karl Ludwig Sand (1820) – beheaded in Mannheim, Baden, for the murder of August von Kotzebue
- Max Hödel (1878) – executed for attempting to assassinate Emperor Wilhelm I

=== Weimar Republic before 1933 ===
- Rupert Fischer (1924) – murderer; first to be guillotined by Johann Reichhart who executed 3165 condemned
- Fritz Haarmann (1925) – called the Butcher (or Vampire) of Hanover; guillotined in Hanover for murder
- Peter Kürten (1931) – called the Vampire of Düsseldorf; guillotined in Cologne for murder

=== Nazi Germany ===
- Bruno Tesch (1933) – executed in Altona with three others after "Altona Bloody Sunday"
- Marinus van der Lubbe (1934) – guillotined in Leipzig for starting the Reichstag fire
- Benita von Falkenhayn and Renate von Natzmer (1935) – executed by axe in Berlin for espionage for Poland
- Edgar Josef André (1936) – beheaded in Hamburg for treasonous involvement in the Reichstag Fire
- Helmut Hirsch (1937) – executed in Berlin for treason
- Lilo Herrmann (1938) – guillotined in Berlin for treason
- Wilhelm Kusserow (1940) – Jehovah's Witness beheaded for refusing to serve in German military service
- Maurice Bavaud (1941) – guillotined in Berlin for attempting to assassinate Hitler
- Helmuth Hübener (1942) – guillotined in Berlin for treason
- Ilse Stöbe (1942) – guillotined in Berlin for treason via Red Orchestra
- Wolfgang Kusserow (1942) – Jehovah's Witness beheaded for refusing to serve in German military service
- Franz Jägerstätter (1943) – guillotined in Berlin as a conscientious objector
- Maria Restituta (1943) – guillotined for treason
- Cato Bontjes van Beek (1943) – guillotined in Berlin for conspiracy to commit treason
- Mildred Harnack (1943) – American born; guillotined in Berlin for anti-Nazi activity via Red Orchestra
- Sophie Scholl (1943) – guillotined for treason via the White Rose resistance group
- Hans Scholl (1943) – brother of above – guillotined for treason via the White Rose resistance group
- Christoph Probst (1943) – guillotined for treason via the White Rose resistance group
- Willi Graf (1943) – guillotined for treason via the White Rose resistance group
- Alex Schmorell (1943) – guillotined for treason via the White Rose resistance group
- Kurt Huber (1943) – guillotined for treason via the White Rose resistance group
- Otto and Elise Hampel (1943) – guillotined in Berlin for treason
- Josefine Brunner (1943) - decapitated at Stadelheim Prison in Munich, for anti-Nazi activities
- Musa Cälil (1944) – guillotined in Plötzensee Prison, Berlin, for anti-Nazi activities
- Werner Seelenbinder (1944) – beheaded with an axe for being a communist
- Friedrich Lorenz (1944) – beheaded at Halle an der Saale for assisting the enemy

== Great Britain ==
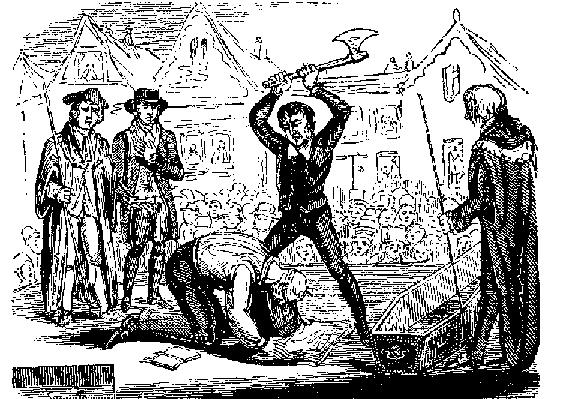
Execution of Lord Lovat, 1747

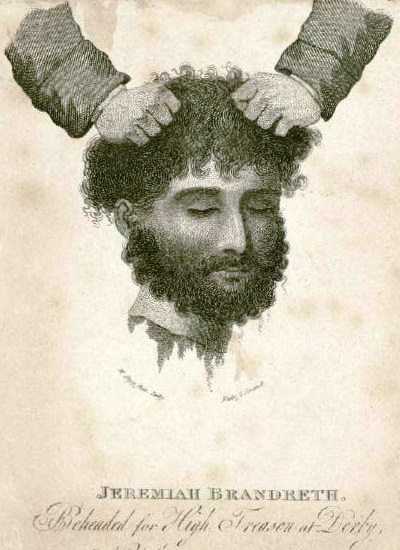
Jeremiah Brandreth's head, 1817

- William Gordon, 6th Viscount of Kenmure (1716) – executed at Tower Hill as a Jacobite Rebel
- James Radclyffe, 3rd Earl of Derwentwater (1716) – executed at Tower Hill as a Jacobite Rebel
- Arthur Elphinstone, 6th Lord Balmerinoch (1746) – beheaded at Tower Hill as a Jacobite supporter of Prince Charles Edward Stuart, he was taken prisoner at Culloden
- William Boyd, 4th Earl of Kilmarnock (1746) – beheaded at Tower Hill as a Jacobite supporter of Prince Charles Edward Stuart, he was taken prisoner at Culloden
- Charles Radclyffe, titular 5th Earl of Derwentwater (1746) – executed at Tower Hill as a Jacobite Rebel
- Simon Fraser, 11th Lord Lovat (1747) – executed at Tower Hill as a prominent veteran Jacobite supporter of Prince Charles Edward Stuart. Although too old to participate in the 1745 Rising, he was chosen by the British Crown for execution in lieu of his youthful son, who had actually led Clan Fraser for the Jacobite cause
- Jeremiah Brandreth (1817) – hanged and beheaded in Derby for treason; followed by William Turner and Issac Ludlam, the last British executions in which death was caused by an axe
- Arthur Thistlewood and the four other Cato Street Conspirators (1820) – hanged and beheaded outside Newgate Prison for treason. A surgical knife was used to remove the heads.
- James Wilson, Andrew Hardie, and John Baird (1820) were hanged and beheaded for treason for their involvement in the Radical War. A hatchet was used to perform the decapitation. These were the last three people to be hanged and beheaded in the United Kingdom.
- Ashley Dighton (2007) – 19-year-old, went missing at a store in Ashford, found dead a month later in a woodland near the store, his head is still missing
- Jolanta Bledaite (2008) – Lithuanian immigrant, tortured and killed in Scotland
- Gerald Mellin (2008) – tied a rope around his neck and connected it to a tree before driving away in his sports car to commit suicide.
- David Phyall (2008) – The 50-year-old last resident in a block of flats due to be demolished in Bishopstoke, near Southampton, England, decapitated himself with a chainsaw to highlight the injustice of being forced to move out of it.
- David Cawthorne Haines (2014) – decapitated in the Syro-Arabian desert by the Islamic State of Iraq and the Levant
- Damien Heagney (2022) – killed and then dismembered by Stephen McCourt.

== Hungary ==
- László Hunyadi (1457) – executed by Ladislaus V for plotting against him
- Gurgen Margaryan (2004) – beheaded in his sleep by Azerbaijani Lieutenant Ramil Safarov during a NATO summit in Budapest. Safarov stated during both his interrogation and trial that he murdered Margaryan because he was of Armenian descent. Safarov was later pardoned upon extradition by the President of Azerbaijan, Ilham Aliyev.
- János Kádár (2007) – posthumously beheaded by grave desecrater(s).

== India ==
- Hemchandra Vikramaditya, also known as Hemu (1556) – after being wounded by Mughal army in the Second Battle of Panipat, Hemu was beheaded by Bairam Khan, a commander-in-chief of the Mughal army
- Guru Tegh Bahadur (1675) – ninth guru of Sikhs executed in Delhi by order of Mughal emperor Aurangzeb
- Chhatrapati Sambhaji Raje (1689) - Second Chhatrapati of Maratha Empire executed in Vadhu on the orders of Mughal Badshah Aurangzeb for not converting to Islam and revealing the location of Royal exchequer.
- Saint John de Brito (1693) – Portuguese Jesuit missionary executed in India for preaching Christianity
- Raja Dahir (711/712) – executed on command of Muhammad bin Qasim after Dahir's Kingdom of Sindh was defeated
- Mourya Sawant (1912) – last Ranes was beheaded by Portuguese. Mourya Sawant was Hindu martyr who struggled against Portuguese and he also against forced conversion of the Goans to Christianity
- Amarsinh Solanki (2008) – captain of the MV Kuber, a fishing trawler that was hijacked by Lashkar-e-Taiba terrorists three days before the 2008 Mumbai attacks began, four other fishermen named Ramesh Nagji Bamaniya, Baleant Prabhu, Mukesh Rathod and Natu Nanu were also killed and thrown overboard
- 2013 India–Pakistan border skirmishes – two Indian Army soldiers, Lance Naik Hemraj and Lance Naik Sudhakar Singh were killed and their bodies were apparently found mutilated, with one decapitated by Pakistan Army soldiers

== Indonesia ==
- Bhre Wirabhumi (1406) - son of Hayam Wuruk; beheaded by Bhra Narapati after trying to flee.
- Demang Lehman (1864) - leader of Banjarmasin War, executed by hanging and later his head was decapitated and brought to the Netherlands.
- Theresia Morangke, Alfita Poliwo, and Yarni Sambue (2005) - Three Christian girls beheaded by militant Islamists in Poso.

== Iraq ==
=== Ancient Mesopotamia ===
- Teumman, king of Elam (653 BC) – executed by the conquering Assyrian Ashubanipal at the Battle of Til-Tuba; his son Tammaritu was also beheaded

=== Umayyad era ===
- Imam Husayn ibn Ali and his 72 companions (680) – at the Battle of Karbala

=== Abbasid era ===
- Al-Walid ibn Tarif al-Shaybani, was a Kharijite rebel leader. In 794, he launched a rebellion against the Abbasid Caliphate, but was defeated, killed, and beheaded in 795.
- Ja'far al-Barmaki (803) – Vizier executed on the orders Caliph Harun al-Rashid (r. 786–809).
- Al-Amin, the sixth Abbasid Caliph (813) – beheaded on 27 September 813 during the conflict.
- Al-Musta'in, the twelfth Abbasid caliph (866) – beheaded on the orders of his cousin al-Mu'tazz.

=== Modern ===
- Shosei Koda (2004) – Japanese citizen beheaded by terrorists
- Kim Sun-il (2004) – South Korean citizen beheaded by terrorists
- Kenneth Bigley (2004) – UK citizen beheaded by terrorists
- Nick Berg (2004) – US citizen beheaded by terrorists
- Eugene Armstrong (2004) – US citizen beheaded by terrorists
- Jack Hensley (2004) – US citizen beheaded by terrorists
- Barzan Ibrahim al-Tikriti (2007) – Saddam Hussein's half brother decapitated during hanging for crimes against humanity

== Iceland ==
- Jon Arason (1550) – was the last Icelandic Roman Catholic bishop and poet, who was executed in his struggle against the imposition of the Protestant Reformation in Iceland.

== Iran ==
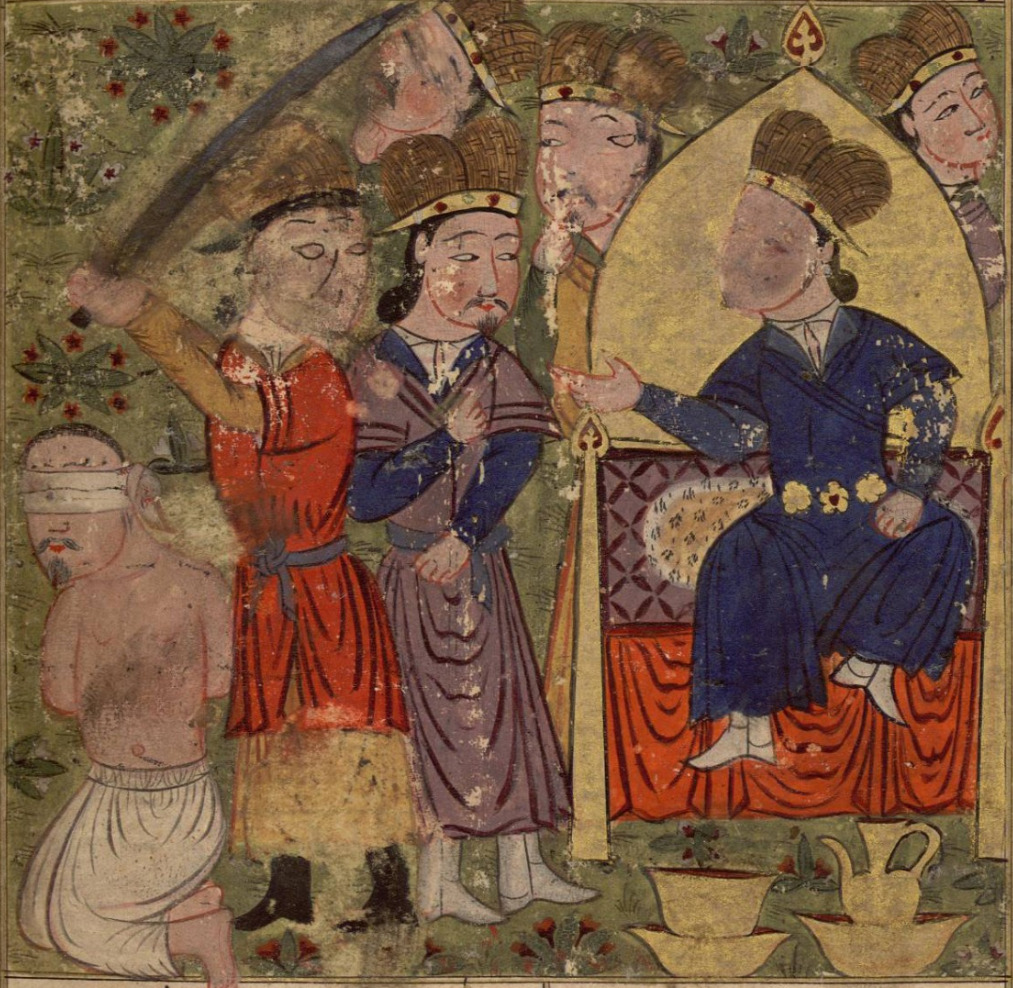
Execution of Buqa

- Buqa (1289) – Grand Vizier. Executed for treason.

== Ireland ==
- Ascall mac Ragnaill (1171) – beheaded after capture when attempting to capture Dublin.
- Tigernán Ua Ruairc (1172) – beheaded on Hill of Ward, Meath during a parlay with Hugh de Lacy, Lord of Meath.
- Cornelius Grogan (1798) – hanged and beheaded in Wexford for taking part in the Irish rebellion of 1798
- John Henry Colclough (1798) – hanged and beheaded in Wexford for taking part in the Irish rebellion of 1798
- Bagenal Beauchamp Harvey (1798) – hanged and beheaded in Wexford for taking part in the Irish rebellion of 1798
- John Kelly (1798) – hanged and beheaded in Wexford for taking part in the Irish rebellion of 1798
- John Murphy (priest) (1798) – hanged and beheaded in Tullow for taking part in the Irish rebellion of 1798

== Israel ==
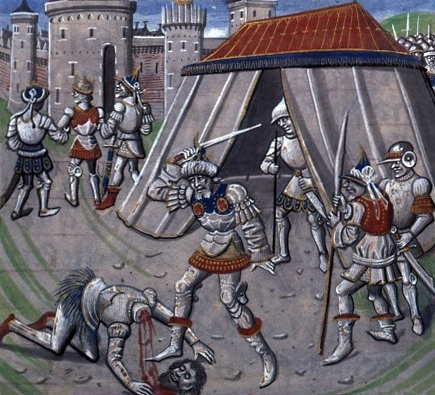
Death of Raynald of Châtillon

- Shimon ben Gamliel and Ishmael ben Elisha ha-Kohen (70) – two rabbis among the Ten Martyrs.
- Bernard de Tremelay, Grand Master of the Knights Templar (1153) – killed and beheaded at the Battle of Ascalon by Egyptians.
- Raynald of Châtillon (1187) – executed by Saladin after the Battle of Hattin
- Gerard de Ridefort, Grand Master of the Knights Templar (1189) – executed by Saladin at the Battle of Acre
- 2,700 Muslim prisoners (1191) – beheaded on orders of Richard I of England after the Battle of Acre.

== Italy ==
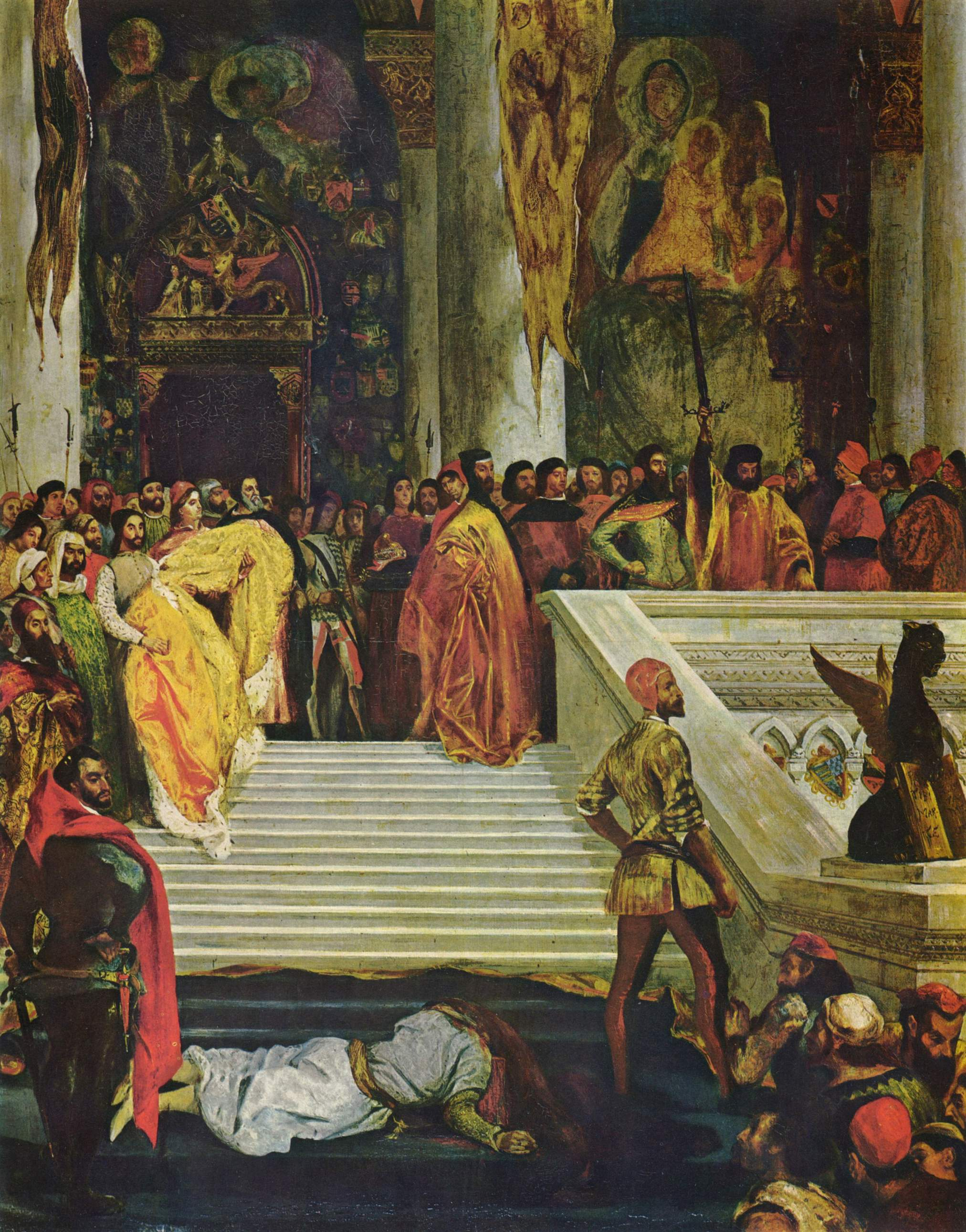
The Execution of Marino Faliero, Eugène Delacroix, 1827.

=== Ancient Rome ===
- Lucius Appuleius Saturninus (100 BC) – radical tribune; Gaius Rabirius toyed with his severed head at a dinner party
- Marcus Antonius (87 BC) – grandfather of Marc Antony
- Marcus Marius Gratidianus (82 BC) – praetor whose head was paraded through Rome after execution
- Gaius Marcius Censorinus (Marian) (82 BC) – beheaded by Sulla, his head was sent to Preneste to lower Gaius Marius the Younger's troop's morale
- Marcus Licinius Crassus (53 BC) – general, politician and richest man then in the world – beheaded posthumously after his defeat in Parthia
- Publius Licinius Crassus (53 BC) – son of Marcus Licinius Crassus – beheaded posthumously in Parthia
- Pompey the Great (48 BC) – general, politician and member of the First Triumvirate – assassinated and beheaded posthumously in Egypt
- Gnaeus Pompeius (45 BC) – Pompey's son – executed for treason by Julius Caesar
- Titus Labienus (45 BC) – general, politician and one of Julius Caesar's foremost subordinates – Killed and beheaded posthumously at the Battle of Munda
- Gaius Trebonius (43 BC) – politician and general, tortured and beheaded by Publius Cornelius Dolabella; his head was kicked around like a football by Dolabella's soldiers
- Cicero (43 BC) – politician, lawyer and Rome's greatest orator – executed by order of Marc Anthony
- Marcus Antonius Antyllus (30 BC) – son of Marc Antony – executed by Octavian
- Claudia Octavia (62) – first wife of Emperor Nero, by whom she was divorced, banished, and executed – beheaded posthumously
- Galba (69) – assassinated Roman emperor
- Pope Sixtus II (258) – Christian Martyr executed during the persecution of Christians ordered by Emperor Valerian
- Stilicho (408) – executed in coup d'état after Gothic invasion
- Anthemius (472) – Emperor, assassinated by Ricimer

=== Medieval Italy ===
- Giordano d'Anglano (1267) – beheaded in Brolo, Sicily by Charles of Anjou after the Battle of Tagliacozzo
- Conradin, King of Sicily (1268) – executed in Naples by Charles of Anjou
- Frederick I of Baden, Margrave of Baden (1268) – executed in Naples by Charles of Anjou
- Fra' Moriale (1354) – beheaded in Rome
- Marino Faliero, Doge of Venice (1355) – executed for a failed coup d'état
- Albert Sterz (1366) – condottiero beheaded in Perugia for treachery
- Giovanni da Barbiano (1399) – condottiero beheaded in Bologna

=== Later Italy ===
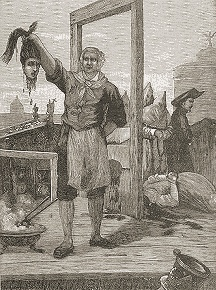
Giovanni Battista Bugatti, executioner of the Papal States between 1796 and 1865, carried out 516 executions

- Antongaleazzo Bentivoglio (1435) – beheaded in Bologna as a rebel
- Gian Paolo Baglioni (1520) – beheaded in Rome for attempted assassination
- Giovanni Carafa, Duke of Paliano (1561) – beheaded by order of Pope Pius IV
- Pietro Carnesecchi (1567) – beheaded by the Christian inquisition for heresy
- Beatrice Cenci and Lucrezia Peroni (1599) – beheaded by sword in Rome for murder of Francesco Cenci
- Ferrante Pallavicino (1644) – beheaded at Avignon for blasphemy by order of Pope Urban VIII
- Felice Orsini (1858) – executed by Napoléon III for attempting to assassinate him

== Japan ==
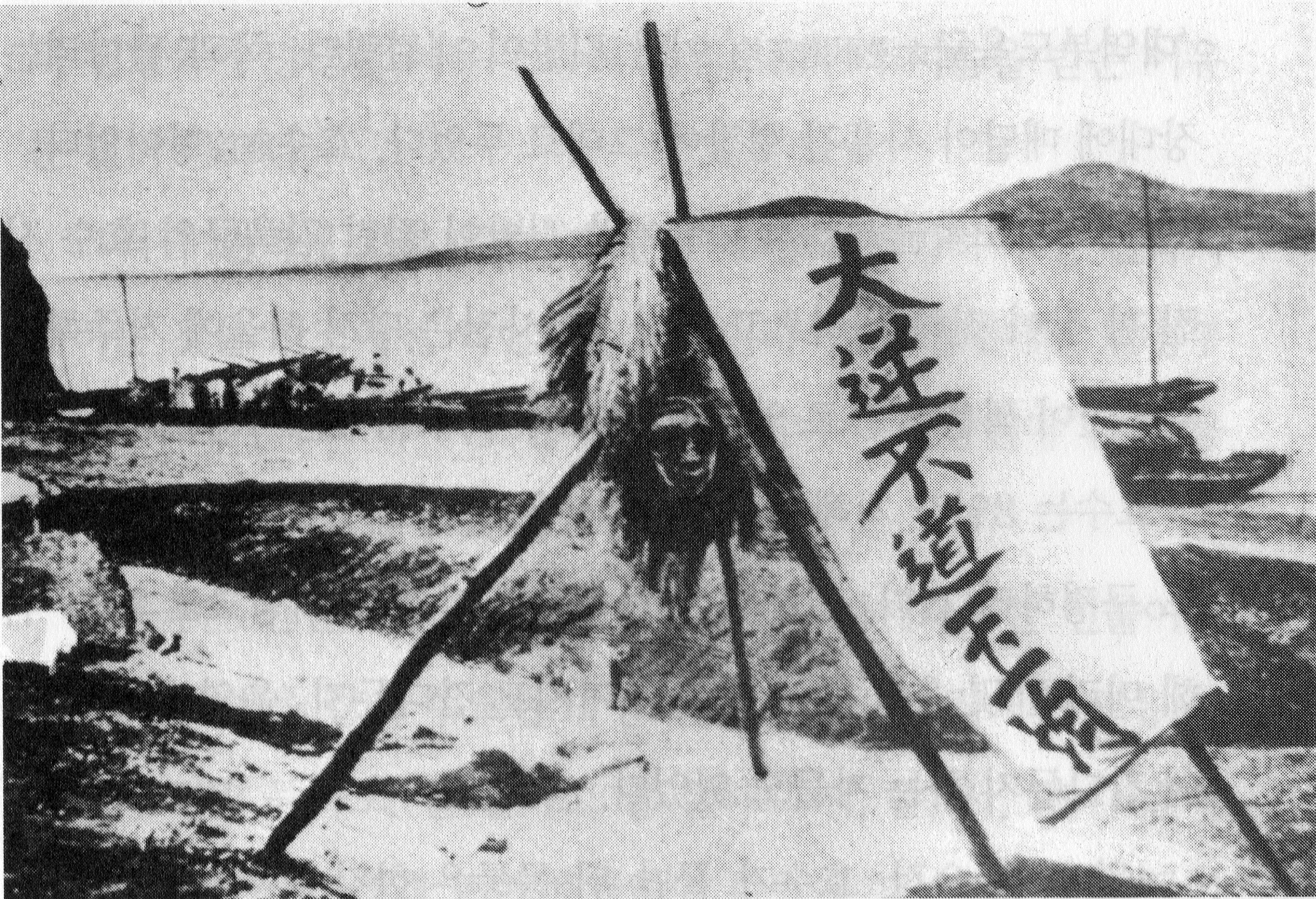
Head of Kim Okgyun, 1894

=== Home islands ===
- Ishida Mitsunari, daimyō and general (1600) – beheaded in Kyoto after the Battle of Sekigahara
- Ankokuji Ekei, Buddhist monk and ally of Mitsunari (1600) – beheaded in Kyoto after the Battle of Sekigahara
- Konishi Yukinaga (1600), ally of Mitsunari – beheaded in Kyoto after the Battle of Sekigahara
- Asano Naganori, lord of the Forty-seven Ronin (1701) – ordered to commit seppuku (hara-kiri) followed by beheading
- Kondo Isami, commander of the Shinsengumi (1868) – executed at Itabashi

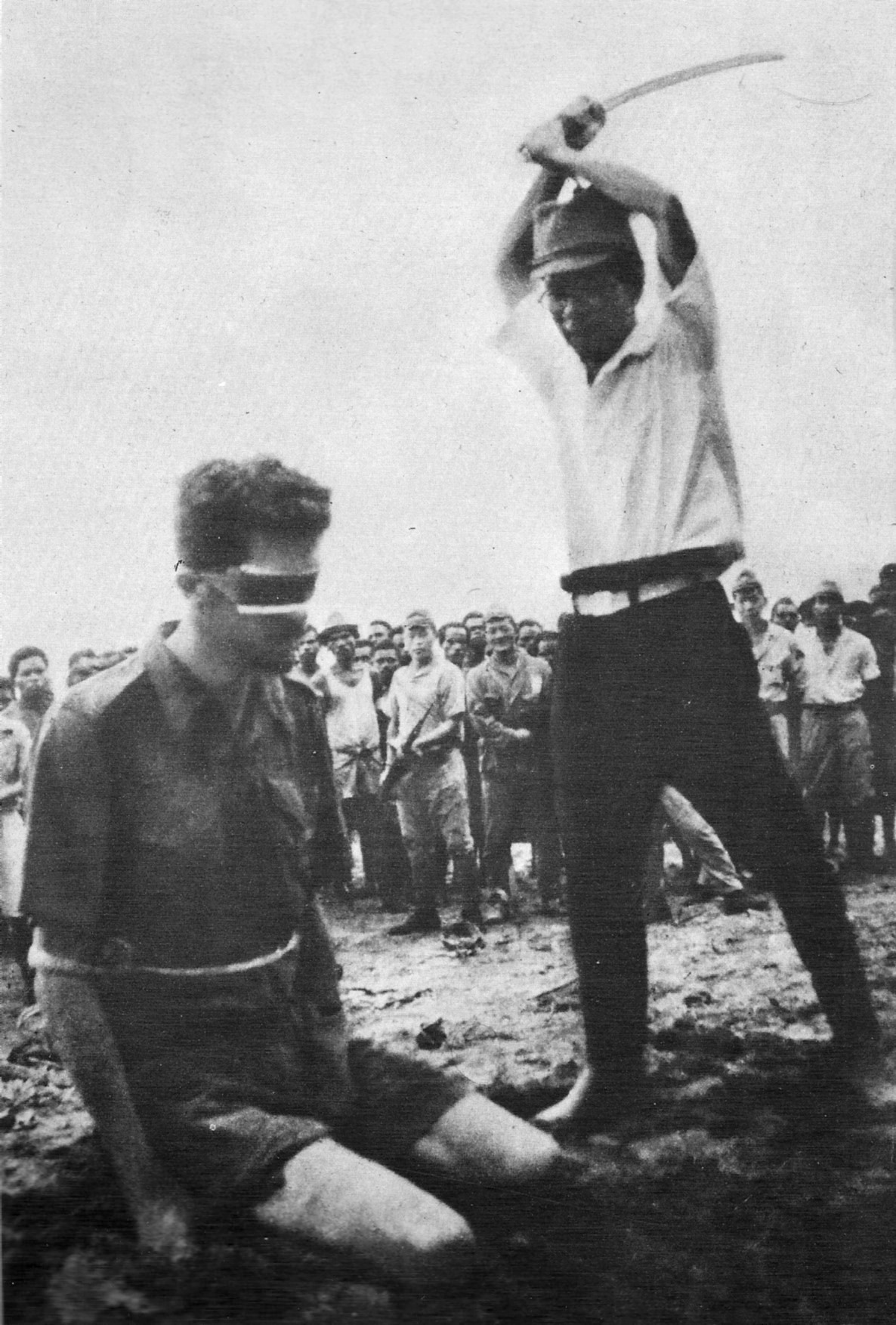
Sergeant Siffleet's execution at Aitape, 1943

=== Japanese-occupied territories (20th century) ===
- William Ellis Newton, VC (1943) – Royal Australian Air Force pilot beheaded in Papua New Guinea by Japanese forces
- Leonard Siffleet (1943) – Australian WWII commando, captured by partisan tribesmen, tortured and beheaded in Papua New Guinea by Japanese soldiers
- Stanley James Woodbridge (1945) – British Royal Air Force crewman captured and beheaded by Japanese forces in Rangoon, Burma

=== Modern Japan ===
- Kenji Goto (2015) – journalist beheaded in Syria by Islamic State of Iraq and the Levant militants after the breakdown of negotiations for his release

== Jordan ==
- Al-Walid II, Umayyad caliph (744) – killed and beheaded by his cousin Yazid III. Yazid had Walid's head hoisted "on a lance and paraded around Damascus".

== Korea ==
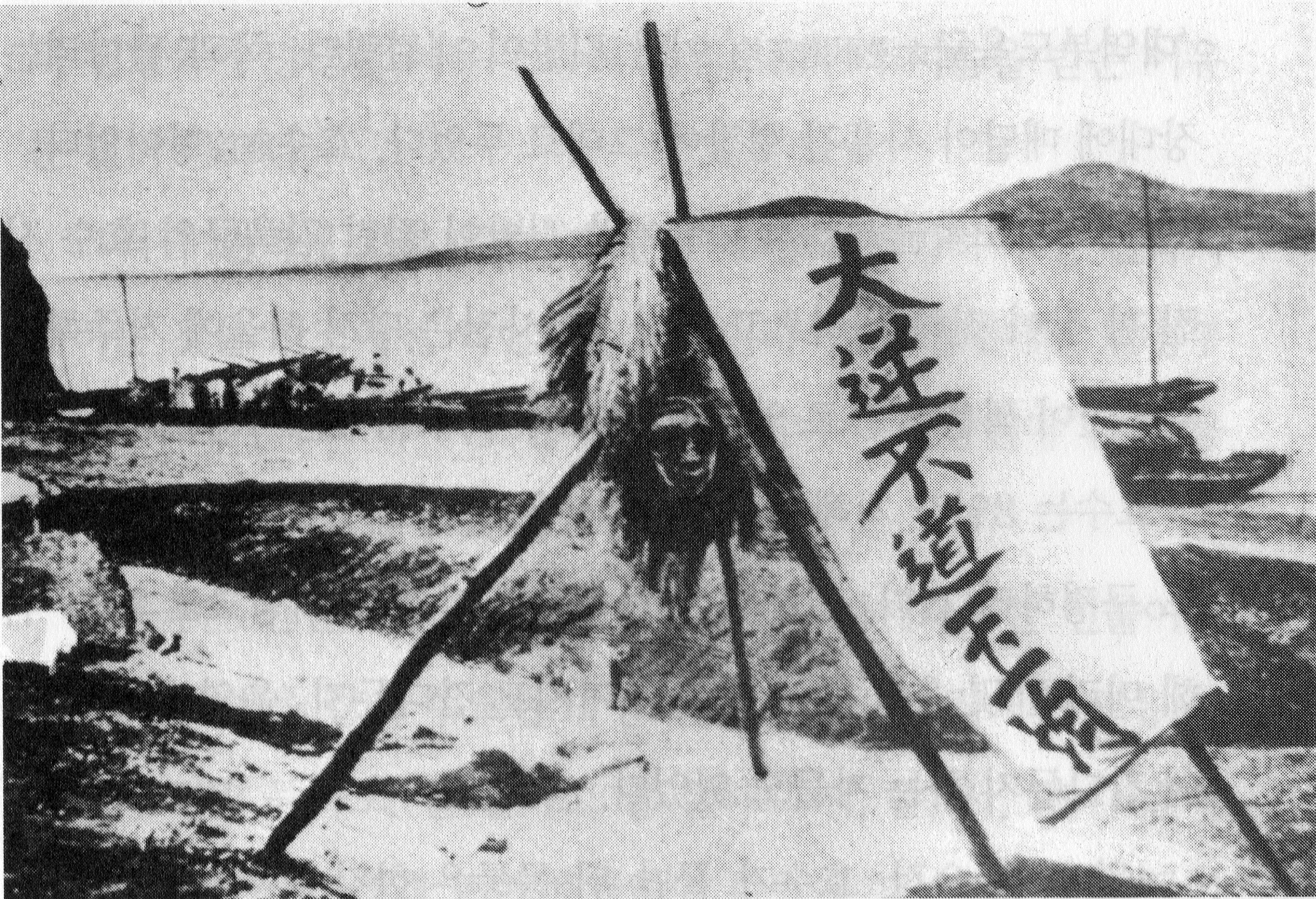
Head of Kim Okgyun, 1894

- Columba Kim (1839) – beheaded for Christian religious convictions
- Laurent-Marie-Joseph Imbert (1839) – beheaded in Saenamteo for being Christian
- Kim Okgyun, Korean activist (1894) – assassinated and beheaded at sea by Hong Jong-u due to leading Gapsin Revolution

== Libya ==
- 21 Coptic Egyptians (2015) – On February 15, 2015, 20 kidnapped Coptic Egyptian Christians and a Ghanaian laborer were beheaded by ISIS Militants on a beach in Tripolitania, Libya. One of ISIS's media wings, Al-Hayat Media Center released a five-minute video of the beheadings, titled "a message signed with blood to the nation of the cross".
- 30 Ethiopian Christians (2015) – On April 19, 2015, 30 kidnapped Ethiopian Christians in two groups were killed by ISIS. Half of them were beheaded on a beach in Cyrenaica and the other half in a desert in Fezzan, were fatally shot with AKs, the Christian killed by the ISIS member giving the speech was shot with a pistol. One of ISIS's media wings, Al-Furqan Media released a thirty-minute propaganda video including the killings, titled "until there came to them clear evidence".

== Morocco ==
- Louisa Vesterager Jespersen and Maren Ueland (2018) – two tourists from Denmark and Norway were beheaded near the village of Imlil by a group of men who had pledged had allegiance to ISIS.

== Netherlands/Belgium ==
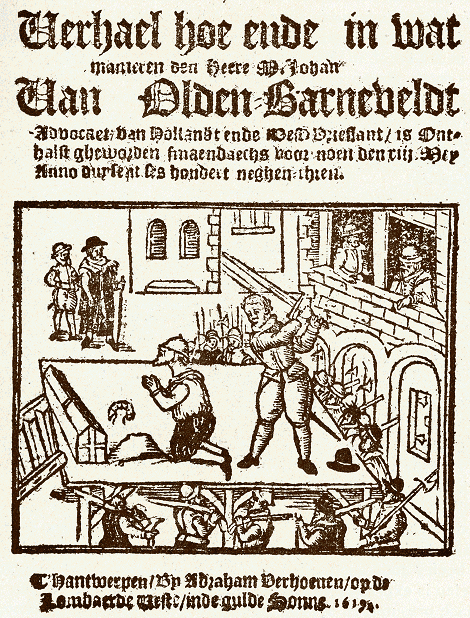
Beheading of Johan van Oldenbarnevelt

- Wijerd Jelckama (1523) – executed in Leeuwarden for the Frisian rebellion
- Anthony van Stralen, Lord of Merksem (1568) – beheaded by the Governor, the Duke of Alba, at Vilvoorde for treason.
- Jan van Casembroot (1568) – beheaded by the Governor, the Duke of Alba, at Vilvoorde for treason.
- Lamoral, Count of Egmont (1568) – beheaded in Brussels for treason.
- Philip de Montmorency, Count of Horn (1568) – beheaded in Brussels for treason
- Balthasar Gérard (1584) – tortured and beheaded for assassinating Willem of Orange
- Johan van Oldenbarnevelt (1619) – executed in the Hague for Hollandic separatism by Prince Maurice
- Emile Ferfaille (1918) – guillotined in Furnes for murder – last guillotine execution
- Nabil Amzieb (2016) – beheaded in Amsterdam by a Moroccan gang for conflicts in underground drug-war

== Norway ==
- Ole Nypan (1670) – executed for witchcraft.
- Anders Olson Lysne (1803) – executed for lèse-majesté.
- Peter Westerstrøm (1809) – executed for mass murder.
- Aslak Hætta (1854) – executed for murder.
- Mons Somby (1854) – executed for murder.
- Kristoffer Nilsen Svartbækken Grindalen (1876) – executed for murder and robbery, the last public execution in Norway.

== Pakistan ==
- Arab Sind Province of Caliphate

Raja Dahir (712) – executed on command of Muhammad bin Qasim after Dahir's empire was defeated.

- United Provinces of Agra and Oudh

Syed Ahmad Barelvi (1831) – Sufi mujahideen who was beheaded by the Indian army in the Battle of Balakot

- Islamic Republic of Pakistan

Daniel Pearl (2002) – American journalist killed by al-Qaeda.
Piotr Stańczak (2009) – Polish engineer beheaded in Pakistan by Radical Islamic terrorists

== Philippines ==
The following were all executed by ISIL-inspired terrorist group Abu Sayyaf.

- Bernard Then (2015) – Malaysian man who was kidnapped from a restaurant in Sandakan, Malaysia, brought over to Parang, Sulu, and beheaded after ransom demands were not met
- Robert Hall (2016) – Canadian welder held for ransom, after the resort he was staying at was raided by Abu Sayyaf militants. They demanded 300 million pesos (around $6.5 million) for his release, and when the demand was not met, Hall was beheaded nine months later in Patikul, Sulu
- John Ridsdel (2016) – Canadian businessman, also held for ransom at the same resort as Robert Hall. Ridsdel was beheaded on 25 April 2016, nine months after being held hostage
- Jürgen Kantner (2017) – German sailor ambushed and held for ransom, while out sailing with his wife, who was shot and killed. Abu Sayyaf militants demanded 30 million pesos ($600,000), and when the demand was not met, Kantner was beheaded

== Poland ==
- Kazimierz Łyszczyński (1689) – executed in Warsaw by Christians for being atheist
- Rozalia Lubomirska (1794) – guillotined during French Revolution

== Portugal ==
- Diogo de Meneses – Behead (or hanged) by orders of the Duke of Alba during the War of the Portuguese Succession
- Leonor de Távora, 3rd Marquise of Távora (1759) – Executed by high treason by orders of the Marquis of Pombal during the Távora Affair

== Russia ==
- Yuri II of Vladimir (1238) – beheaded after losing the Battle of the Sit River
- Philipp Schall von Bell (1560) – executed in captivity by order of Ivan the Terrible.
- Stenka Razin (1671) – quartered alive in Moscow for Cossack revolution
- Ivan Andreyevich Khovansky (Tararui) (1682) – beheaded for involvement in the Moscow uprising of 1682
- Ivan Tsykler (1697) – quartered on charges of conspiracy against Peter the Great
- Mary Hamilton (lady in waiting) (1719) – executed for infanticide and slandering Catherine I of Russia
- Yemelyan Pugachev (1775) – quartered in Moscow for insurrection by Catherine II of Russia
- Yevgeny Rodionov (1996) – beheaded by Chechen militants
- Renata Kambolina (2015) – beheaded by train as a result of deliberate suicide.
- Shamil Umakhanovich Odamanov (2007) – Dagestani man beheaded by Russian neo-Nazi Maxim Martsinkevich, an unknown Tajik man was also murdered along with Odamanov.
- Salohitdin Muhabbatshovich Azizov (2008) – Tajik immigrant beheaded by Russian neo-Nazi group BORN in a racially motivated attack on the village of Zhabkino, another man was shot and wounded in the attack.
- Alena Shitik (2014) – 40-year-old Belarusian national beheaded by members of the Cleaners.

== Saudi Arabia ==
- Prince Faisal bin Musa'id (1975) – for the assassination of his uncle, King Faisal
- Juhayman al-Otaybi (1980) – Saudi Arabian terrorist beheaded for committing the 1979 Grand Mosque seizure
- Paul Marshall Johnson, Jr. (2004) – American engineer killed by Al-Qaeda on the Arabian Peninsula
- Rizana Nafeek (2013) – Sri Lankan woman for homicide

== Scotland ==
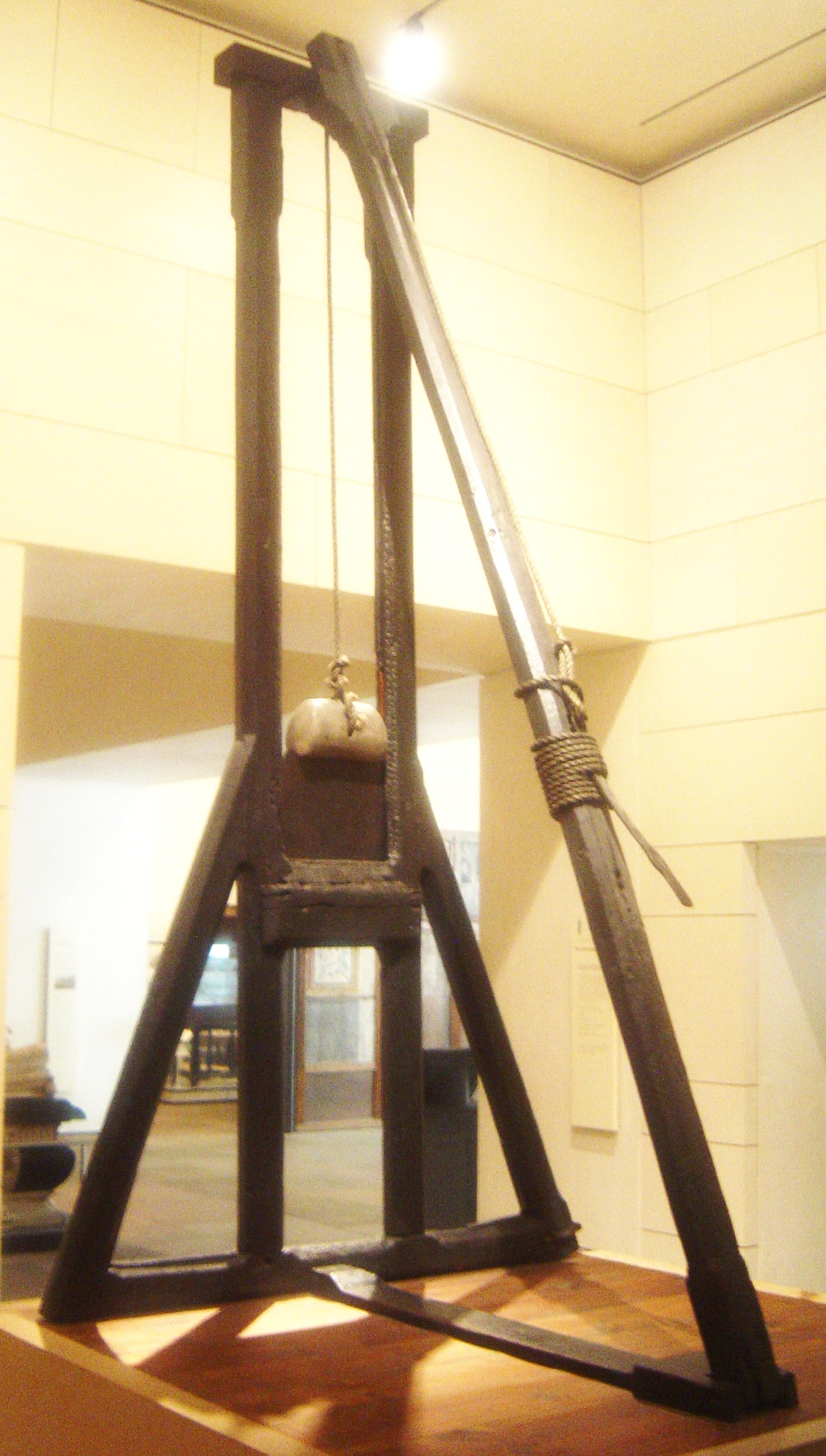
The Scottish Maiden on display at the Museum of Scotland, Edinburgh

- Donnchadh, Earl of Lennox (1425) – executed by orders of James I of Scotland
- Lord Walter Stewart and Lord Alexander Sewart (1425) – executed by orders of James I of Scotland
- Murdoch Stewart, Duke of Albany (1425) – executed by order of James I of Scotland
- Walter Stewart, 1st Earl of Atholl (1437) – executed for his part in the murder of James I of Scotland
- William Douglas, 6th Earl of Douglas (1440) – executed at Edinburgh Castle on trumped-up charges in front of James II of Scotland
- Lord David Douglas (1440) – executed at Edinburgh Castle on trumped-up charges in front of James II of Scotland
- Hugh Douglas, Earl of Ormonde (1455) – executed on the orders of James II of Scotland
- John Douglas, Lord of Balvenie (1463) – executed on the orders of James III of Scotland
- Sir James Hamilton of Finnart – Master of Work to the Crown of Scotland (1540) – executed by order of James V of Scotland
- James Douglas, 4th Earl of Morton (1581) – executed on the Scottish maiden for complicity in murder of Lord Darnley
- William Ruthven, 1st Earl of Gowrie (1584) – executed by order of James VI of Scotland
- John Maxwell, 9th Lord Maxwell (1613) – beheaded in Edinburgh for carrying out a revenge killing
- Patrick Stewart, 2nd Earl of Orkney (1615) – executed by order of James VI of Scotland
- Sir John Gordon, 1st Baronet, of Haddo (1644) – executed on the Scottish maiden by the Covenanters for treason as a Royalist
- Archibald Campbell, 1st Marquess of Argyll (1661) – executed by order of Charles II of Scotland on the Scottish maiden for treason
- Mrs Hamilton (1679) – beheaded for the murder of James Baillie, 2nd Lord Forrester
- Archibald Campbell, 9th Earl of Argyll (1685) – son of above; executed by order of James VII of Scotland on the Scottish maiden for treason
- Godfrey McCulloch (1697) – executed on the Scottish maiden for murder; last man to be executed by the maiden

== Serbia ==
- Prince Lazar Hrebeljanović (1389) – executed during the Battle of Kosovo by order of Bayezid I.
- Miloš Obilić (1389) – probably decapitated by order of Bayezid I after assassinating Murad I.
- Aleksa Nenadović (1804) – executed in Valjevo during the Slaughter of the Knezes.
- Ilija Birčanin (1804) – executed in Valjevo during the Slaughter of the Knezes.
- Karađorđe (1817) – Assassinated by order of his groomsman, Miloš Obrenović. The cause of death itself was a substantial chest injuries caused by an axe, however, his body was immediately decapitated.

== Spain ==
- Eulogius of Cordova (859) – executed by Muslim rulers of Córdoba for blasphemy
- Lope Fortuñónez de Albero (1135) – executed by King of Aragon, Ramiro II, for treason
- Fortún Galíndez de Huesca (1135) – executed by King of Aragon, Ramiro II, for treason
- Martín Galíndez de Ayerbe (1135) – executed by King of Aragon, Ramiro II, for treason
- Bertrán de Ejea (1135) – executed by King of Aragon, Ramiro II, for treason
- Miguel de Rada de Perarrúa (1135) – executed by King of Aragon, Ramiro II, for treason
- Íñigo López de Naval (1135) – executed by King of Aragon, Ramiro II, for treason
- Cecodín de Ruesta (1135) – executed by King of Aragon, Ramiro II, for treason
- Muhammed VI (1362) – beheaded by Peter I of Castille with restored Muhammad V as Sultan of Granada.
- Juan Bravo (1521) – executed in Villalar de los Comuneros, Valladolid
- Juan de Padilla (1521) – executed in Villalar de los Comuneros, Valladolid
- Francisco Maldonado (1521) – executed in Villalar de los Comuneros, Valladolid
- Antonio Osorio de Acuña (1526) – executed in Simancas for supporting the Comunero Revolt
- Juan de Lanuza y Urrea (1591) – "Justicia de Aragón", beheaded by personal order of Felipe II on 20 December 1591, 89 days after swearing in his appointment.
- Rodrigo Calderon (1621) – executed in Madrid
- Eduardo Montori Sanz (1996) – beheaded in Ejea de los Caballeros
- Jennifer Mills-Westley (2011) – beheaded in a supermarket in Los Cristianos, Tenerife.

== Sri Lanka ==
- Puviraja Pandaram (1591) – Hindu king who was beheaded by Portuguese. Portuguese, led by André Furtado as commander, mounted a military campaign against the Jaffna kingdom from Mannar and succeed for conquer Jaffna kingdom.
- Keppetipola Disawe (1818) – beheaded by British Ceylon in Kandy, Sri Lanka for fighting for independence.

== Sweden ==
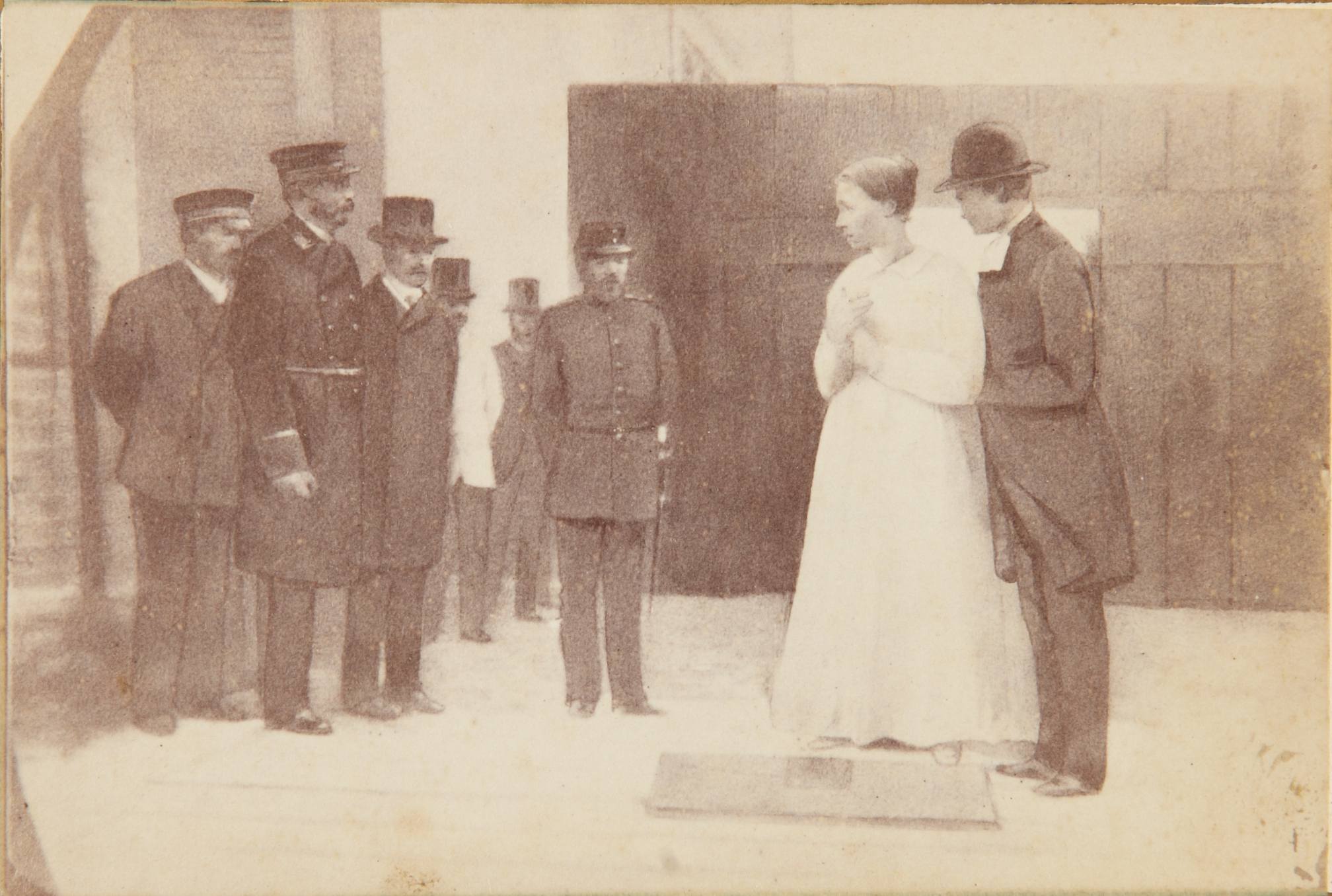
Execution of Anna Månsdotter. The executioner Dalman stands to the far left, hiding his axe behind his back.

- Mattias Gregersson (1520) – Bishop of Strängnäs; first of about 100 to be executed by Danes in the Stockholm Bloodbath
- Vincent Henningsson (1520) – Bishop of Skara; executed by Danes in the Stockholm Bloodbath
- Måns Gren (1520) – Swedish nobleman; one of 15 noblemen executed by Danes in the Stockholm Bloodbath
- Grigory Kotoshikhin (1667) – Russian defected diplomat; executed in Stockholm for the murder of a homeowner under the influence of alcohol.
- Anna Zippel (1676) – executed in Stockholm for witchcraft
- Brita Zippel (1676) – sister of above; executed in Stockholm for witchcraft
- Johan Johansson Griis (1676) – witness in the trial against the above sisters; executed for perjury
- Anna Eriksdotter (1704) – beheaded for sorcery.
- Jacob Johan Anckarström (1792) – executed for assassination of Gustav III
- Metta Fock (1810) – executed for murder of her husband and children
- Anna Månsdotter (1890) – executed by axe for murder; last woman executed in Sweden
- John Filip Nordlund (1900) – executed by axe in Västerås for mass murder
- Johan Alfred Ander (1910) – executed by guillotine in Stockholm for murder; last Swedish execution

== Syria ==
- James Foley (2014) – American journalist beheaded in Raqqa, Syria by the Islamic State of Iraq and the Levant, specifically Mohammed Emwazi, in retaliation for American airstrikes in Iraq. His execution was filmed, in a beheading video titled "A Message to America".
- Steven Sotloff (2014) – beheaded in the Syro-Arabian desert by the Islamic State of Iraq and the Levant, two weeks after the beheading of James Foley. His execution was filmed, and released with the title "A Second Message to America".
- Abdullah Tayseer Al Issa (2016) – Syrian soldier beheaded by members of the Nour al-Din al-Zenki Movement.
- Saqib Haider Karbalai (April 2017) – Founder and commander-in-chief of Liwa Zainebiyoun who went missing during the Hama offensive (March–April 2017) and later found dead without his head in 2019.
- Muhammad Abdullah al-Ismail (July 2017) – Syrian deserter who was bludgeoned to death and beheaded by Wagner mercenaries.

== Switzerland ==
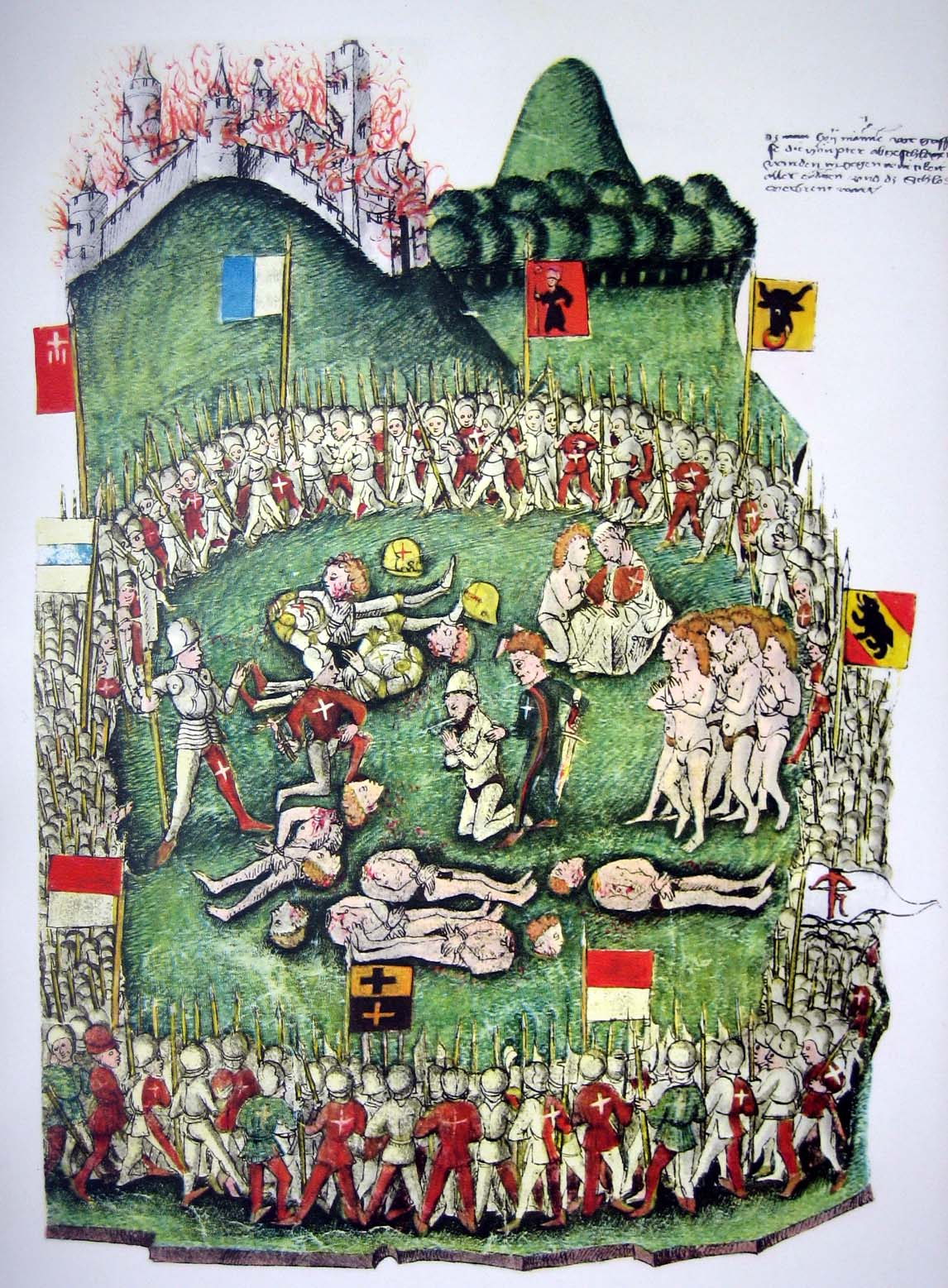
Execution of Greifensee garrison

- Wildhans von Breitenlandenberg and 61 companions (1444) – executed following the siege of Greifensee during the Old Zürich War
- Anna Göldi (1782) – executed as the "last witch in Switzerland"

== Turkey ==
=== Byzantine era ===
- Saint Blaise (316)
- Phocas (610) – Emperor overthrown and beheaded by Heraclius
- Leontios (706)
- Tiberius III (706)
- Justinian II (711)

=== Ottoman era ===
- Bajo Pivljanin (1685) – Serb hajduk in Venetian service, beheaded and head sent to Sultan Mehmed IV
- Abdullah bin Saud (1818) – last ruler of the First Saudi State and was beheaded by the Ottomans
- Ali Pasha of Yanina (1822) – shot and beheaded by order of Sultan Mahmud II

=== Republic era ===
- Killings of Ayşenur Halil and İkbal Uzuner (2024)

== Ukraine ==
- Chernihiv murders (2010) – two elderly women and an elderly man were beheaded with a shovel by a Neo-Nazi.
- Trofimov family (2012) – the family of a judge in Kharkiv were beheaded in their home.
- Serhiy Andriyovych Potoki (2022) – Ukrainian soldier beheaded on video by Russian soldiers.

== United States ==
- Henry Laurens (1792) – decapitated posthumously in accordance with his wishes and then burned on a funeral pyre by his son and slaves.
- Isaac N. Ebey (1857) – Washington state pioneer murdered by Haida.
- Pearl Bryan (1896) – murdered in Fort Thomas, Kentucky.
- Captain Harry Miller (1936) – beheaded after murder near New Trenton, Indiana, "Head and Hands" murder.
- Charles Foster Jones (1942) – shot dead and beheaded by Japanese soldiers on Attu Island, Alaska during the Japanese occupation of Attu.
- Sixteen victims of Jeffrey Dahmer (1978–1991).
- Karen Marsden (1980) – a 20-year-old former sex worker who was bludgeoned to death with several rocks and then beheaded with a knife. Her incomplete and heavily damaged skull was discovered in a wooded area and she was missing. Two other sex workers, Doreen Levesque (17) and Barbara Raposa (19), had been killed in the nearly the same manner, with the only difference being that the two other teenagers weren't dismembered.
- Adam Walsh (1981) — abducted from a Sears department store at the Hollywood Mall in Hollywood, Florida and his head was found in a drainage canal two weeks after he was murdered.
- Vic Morrow and Myca Dinh Le (1982) — decapitated by a helicopter's main rotor in a freak accident on the set of Twilight Zone: The Movie involving explosives that caused the helicopter to spin out of control and crash into them, also crushing a third person, Renee Shin-Yi Chen, with its right skid.
- Christa Hoyt (1990) – decapitated by serial killer Danny Rolling.
- Denise Elaine Sexton Hartley (1993) – disappeared from Saint Paul, Minnesota and her scattered remains were found near Bone Lake, she was unidentified until June, 2026 when her remains were reexamined.
- Frank Griga and Krisztina Furton (1995) – decapitated and dismembered by Daniel Lugo and Adrian Doorbal, members of the infamous Sun Gym gang in Miami.
- James Byrd Jr. (1998) – African-American man attacked by three white men, Shawn Berry and two white supremacists Lawrence Brewer, and John King who dragged Byrd from the back of a truck, Byrd hit a culvert which decapitated him and severed his right arm. Brewer and King were executed in 2011 and 2019 respectively.
- Tiffany Bradley (2000) – a 16-year-old African-American girl and human trafficking victim who was strangled and then dismembered at a YMCA hotel in Chelsea by Eugene McCollom. Her lower body was discovered in the parking lot of a home for disabled veterans around 24 hours after her body had been dumped there. Her hands and head were discovered in plastic container buried on a beach, she went unidentified for over 25 years, before being identified in June, 2026.
- John "Jackie" Leyden (2001) – beaten to death and then decapitated by murderer Eugene McCollom in a Boston, Massachusetts apartment. Both the murders of Tiffany Bradley and Leyden were partially motivated by McCollom's anger from his brother Patrick's murder in 1997.
- Robert Lees (2004) – decapitated by murderer
- Donald Jones (2005) – African-American inmate at Oklahoma State Reformatory who was beheaded by Universal Aryan Brotherhood member Johnny R. Jameson along with another member. The murder was in retaliation for the murder of UAB member Adam Lipert by African-American inmates.
- Yang Xin (2009) – decapitated at Virginia Tech by Zhu Haiyang.
- Aasiya Zubair (2009) – decapitated in New York by murderer/husband Muzzammil Hassan.
- Hervey Coronado Medellin (2012) – killed and dismembered by his live-in boyfriend Gabriel Campos-Martinez. His body was found near the Hollywood Sign.
- Dylan Redwine (2012) – 13-year-old boy who was killed by his father Mark Redwine and then beheaded after he had found ‘compromising photos’ of Mark. His partial remains was discovered on the side of a hiking trail in La Plata County, Colorado in June 2013.
- Hanny Tawadros and Amgad Konds (2013) – decapitated posthumously, allegedly by murderer Yusef Ibrahim.
- Russell Dermond (2014) – shot dead and then beheaded. His wife Shirley was beaten to death and dumped in Lake Oconee in Georgia.
- Charles Oppenneer (2014) - beaten to death and then beheaded by 31-year-old Brady Oestrike during a prostitution meet in Wyoming, Michigan. His girlfriend, 18-year-old Brooke Slocum, was kidnapped and strangled by Oestrike, who committed suicide during a police pursuit. Oppenneer's skull was found almost five years after his death.
- Patricia Ward (2014) – decapitated in her son's apartment in New York City by her deranged son then dragged to the street. Witness initially thought it was a part of a Halloween display. The son then committed suicide by jumping in front of a train.
- Colleen Hufford (2014) – 54-year-old woman was decapitated in Oklahoma by a 30-year-old pro-Jihad Islamist, Jah'Keem Yisrael, formerly Alton Alexander Nolen.
- Lee Manuel Viloria-Paulino (2016) – missing youth who was found to have been decapitated by a classmate.
- Brian Egg (2018) – 65-year-old missing man found weeks later beheaded in a fish tank at his home in San Francisco, California.
- Luis Romero (2019) – decapitated by his cellmate, Jamie Osuna, at Corcoran State Prison in California.
- Jennifer Schlecht (2019) – decapitated by her husband Yonathan Tedla in their Harlem flat. He then killed their daughter and hanged himself on a fan. Tedla had put Jennifer Schlecht's head in her own lap.
- Cecilia Gibson (2020) – 79-year-old Cecilia Gibson, step-grandmother of her killer, Kenny W. McBride, 45, was bludgeoned in head while in house, then McBride decapitated and placed Ms. Gibson's head in their backyard. Kenny W. McBride was arrested at time of reporting after body was dead for two days. McBride's father had married and his new wife's mother, Cecilia Gibson, all lived in the same residence in Bedford, Michigan where the crime occurred.
- Warren Barnes (2021) – 69-year-old Warren Barnes was stabbed to death by Brian Cohee under a highway overpass in Grand Junction, Colorado, his head and hands were cut off and taken by Cohee.
- Alice Trench (2021) - Nicholas Trench murdered Alice Trench (77), Nicholas' grandmother, before decapitating her and setting her body on fire at her home in Ocala, Florida.
- James Garcia (2021) – 51-year-old James "Rabbit" Garcia was stabbed 84 times and then beheaded by 28-year-old Joel Arciniega-Saenz with a small knife, who kicked his head around in a park in Las Cruces, New Mexico. Arciniega was a diagnosed schizophrenic.
- America Thayer (2021) – Beheaded with a machete after an argument with her boyfriend.
- Shad Thyrion (2022) – Shad Thyrion's mother found his severed head in a bucket in the basement of their home in Green Bay, Wisconsin. Taylor Schabusiness, who had a sexual relationship with Thyrion, beheaded him after killing him.
- Karina Castro (2022) – Rafa Solano decapitated Castro, his ex-girlfriend, on a street with a samurai sword in San Carlos, California.
- Mindi Kassotis (2022) – 40-year-old woman who was murdered and dismembered by her ex-husband Nick Kassotis in Liberty County, Georgia. Her remains were scattered in a wooded swamp in Riceboro, Georgia, and her body was identified on 11 May 2023.
- Michael Mohn (2024) — Justin D. Mohn shot and killed his father Mike Mohn who was a government employee and then beheaded his body. He then filmed himself holding Mike's severed head and declared the creation of “Mohn's militia”. Justin was subsequently arrested shortly after.
- Enrique Gonzalez-Carbajal (2025) - Alyssa Marie Lira decapitated Gonzalez-Carbajal (55), her boyfriend of two months, in Anaheim, California before being arrested five months later in Mexico.
- Chandra Mouli Nagamallaiah (2025) – Yordanis Cobos-Martinez decapitated Nagamallaiah (50) with a machete over an argument about a broken washing machine at a Dallas motel.

== Vietnam ==
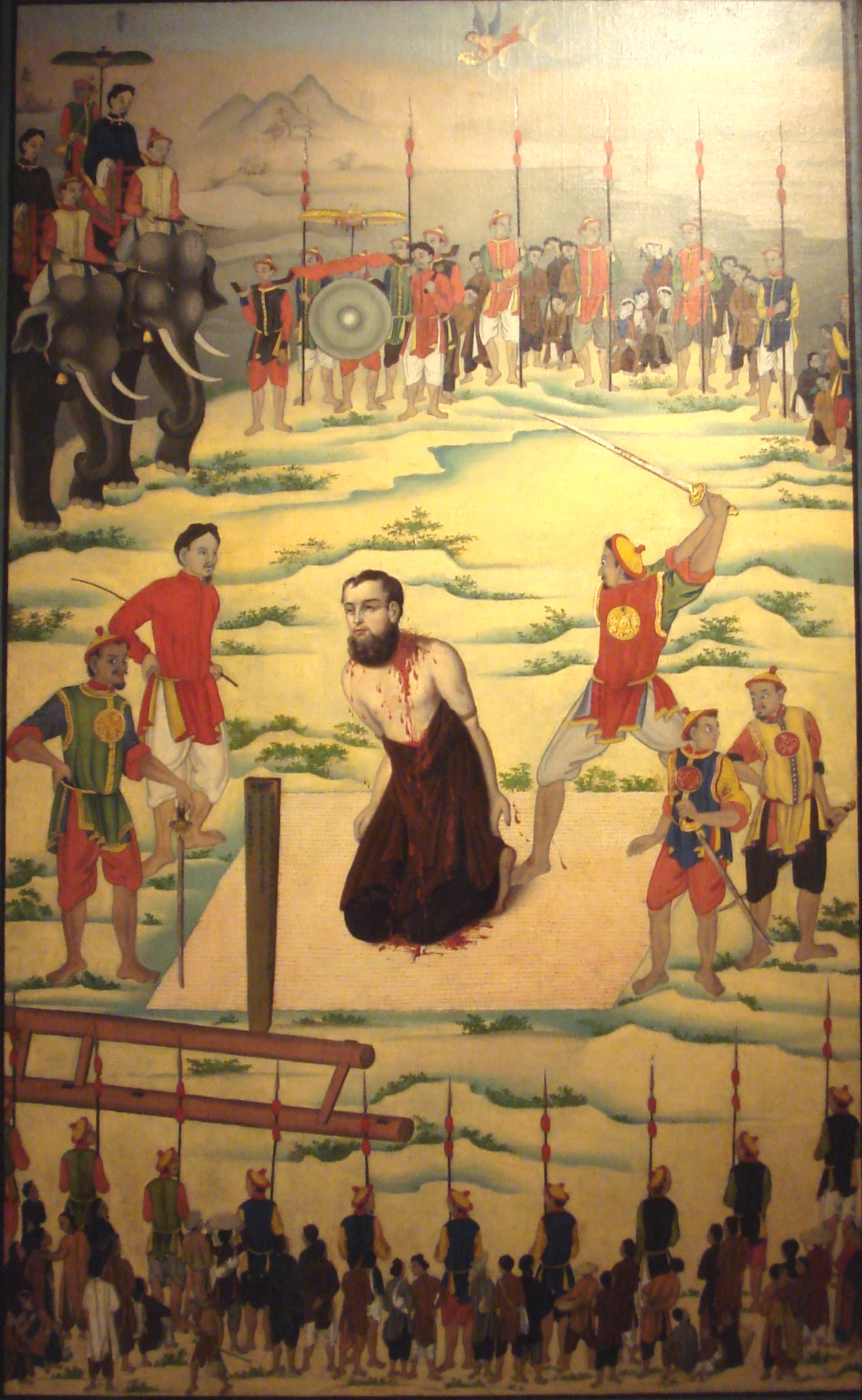
Execution of Pierre Dumoulin-Borie

- Vicente Liem de la Paz (1773) – beheaded in Tonkin as Christian martyr
- Pierre Dumoulin-Borie (1838) – beheaded in Tonkin as Christian martyr
- Bernard Võ Văn Duệ (1838) – beheaded in Korea as Christian martyr
- Andrew Dũng-Lạc (1839) – beheaded in Korea as Christian martyr
- Augustin Schoeffler (1851) – beheaded in Tonkin as Christian martyr
- Jean-Louis Bonnard (1852) – beheaded in Korea as Christian martyr
- Michael Hồ Đình Hy (1857) – beheaded in Korea as Christian martyr
- Théophane Vénard (1861) – beheaded in Tonkin as Christian martyr
- Ba Cụt (Lê Quang Vinh) (1956) – guillotined in Cần Thơ for insurrection and multiple murder
- Nguyễn Xuân Đạt (2025) – a 35-year-old fishmonger and autassassinophile was consensually beheaded in Lạng Sơn by 57-year-old civil servant Đoàn Văn Sáng

== Wales ==
- Gwenllian ferch Gruffudd (February 1136) – executed by the Anglo-Norman forces led by Maurice de Londres at Kidwelly Castle, Wales, after a failed uprising
- Llewelyn ap Gruffydd (1282) – beheaded posthumously after his death in battle at Aberedw
- Sir Gruffudd Vychan (1447) – executed at Powis Castle by Lord Powis for unclear reasons
- Sir Roger Vaughan (1471) – beheaded at Chepstow by Jasper Tudor, Earl of Bedford for being a Yorkist

== Religious figures ==
=== The Bible ===
==== Hebrew Bible/Old Testament ====
- Goliath – after he was killed by David, this example illustrates the aforementioned post-mortem decapitation
- Saul – after he fell on his sword at the Battle of Mount Gilboa (1 Samuel 31:3–6); the Philistines cut off his head and fastened his body to the wall of Beth-shan.
  - Sheba son of Bichri – killed by the people of Abel-beth-maachah to stop the soldiers of David pursuing him from destroying the city
- Ish-bosheth – killed by Baanah and Rekab in his bed after they entered his house under the pretext of borrowing wheat.

==== Apocrypha ====
- Holofernes – in the deuterocanonical Book of Judith

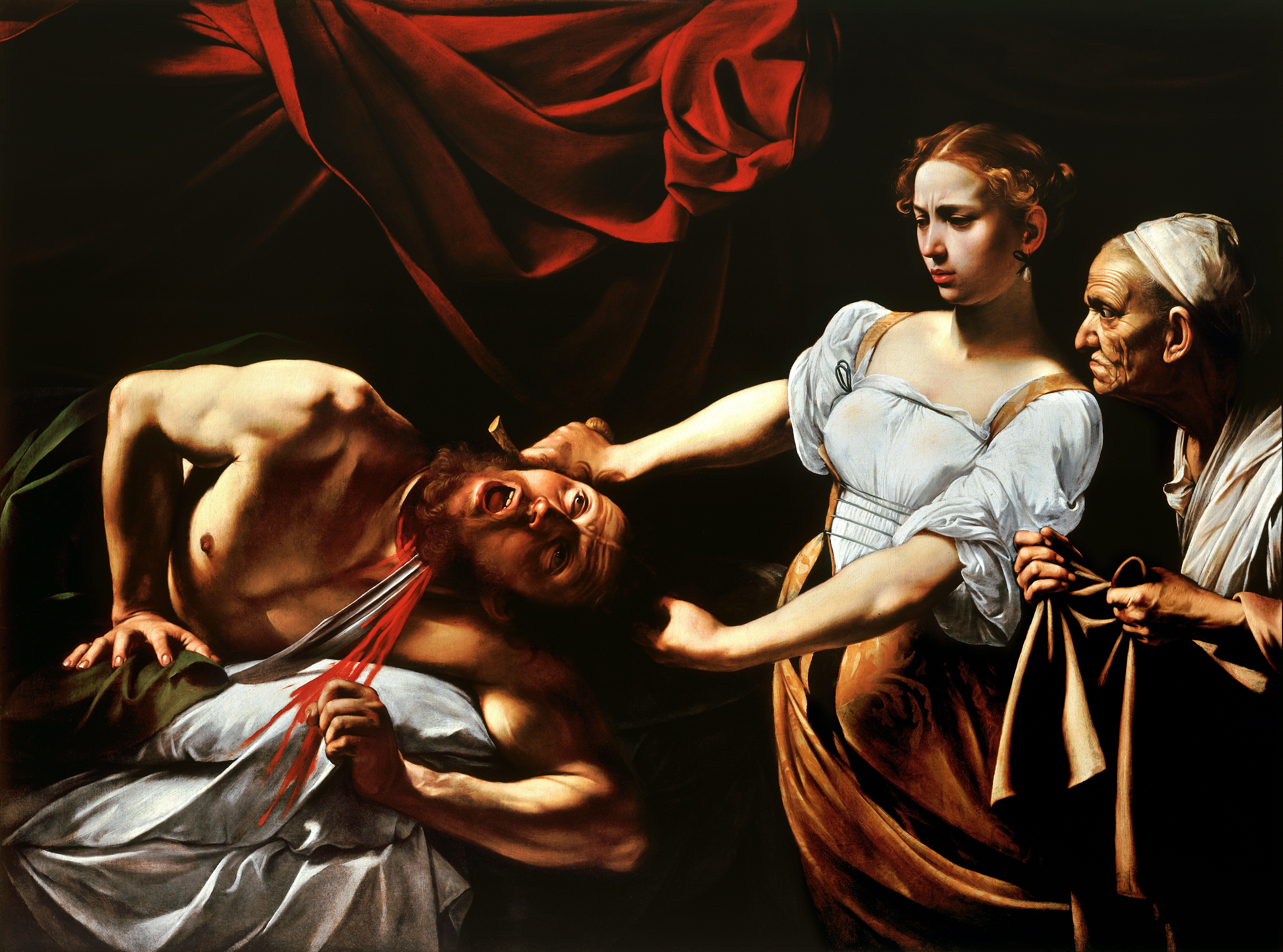
Judith Beheading Holofernes (Caravaggio)

==== New Testament ====
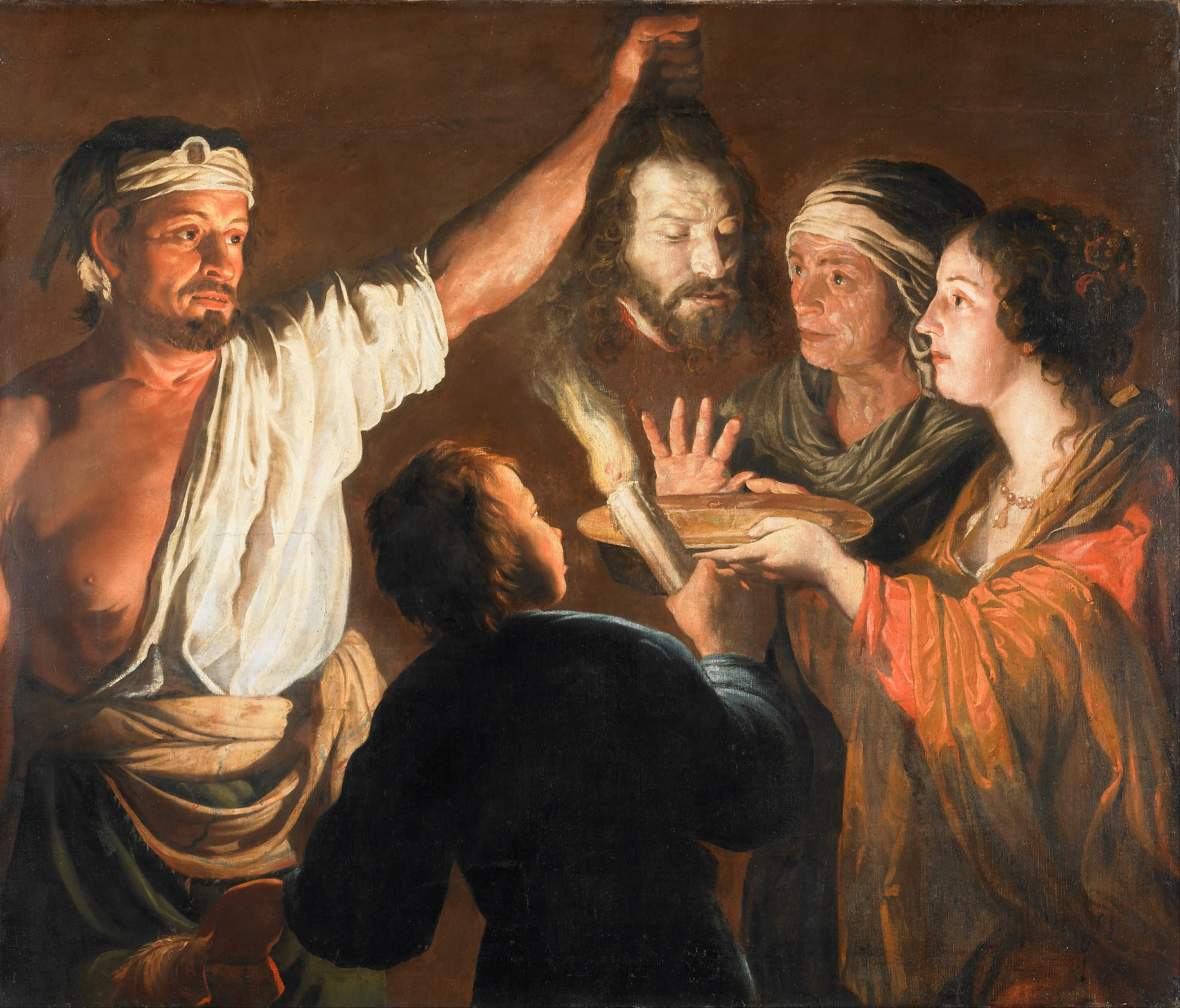
The Executioner with the Head of John the Baptist (William Dobson)

- John the Baptist (c. AD 30) – in the Gospels by order of Herod Antipas
- Theudas (c. AD 46) – Jewish rebel mentioned in the Book of Acts; severed head displayed in Jerusalem

=== Catholic saints ===
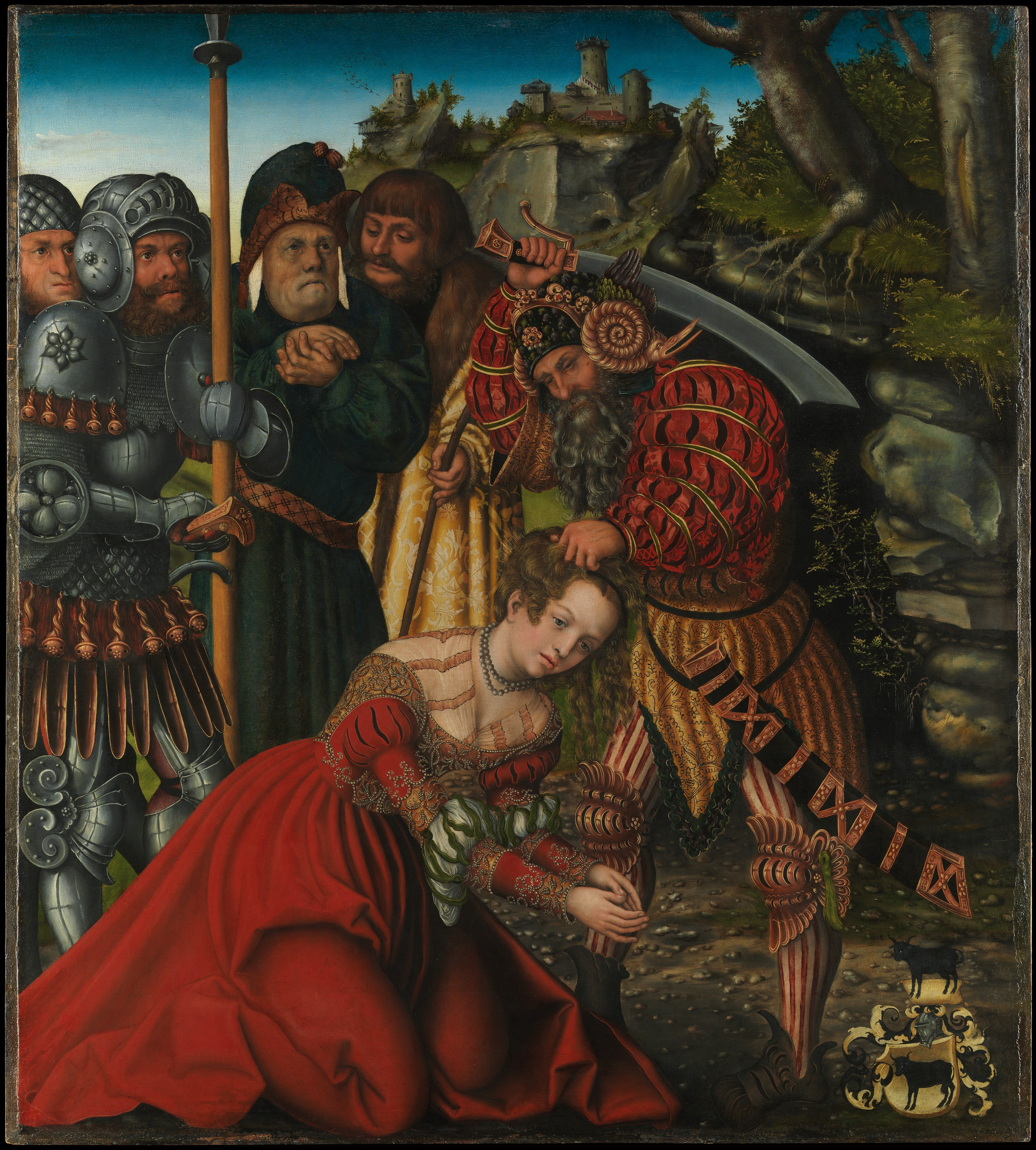
The martyrdom of St Barbara

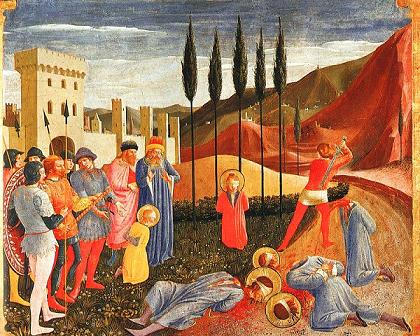
The martyrdom of Saints Cosmas and Damian by Fra Angelico (Musée du Louvre, Paris)

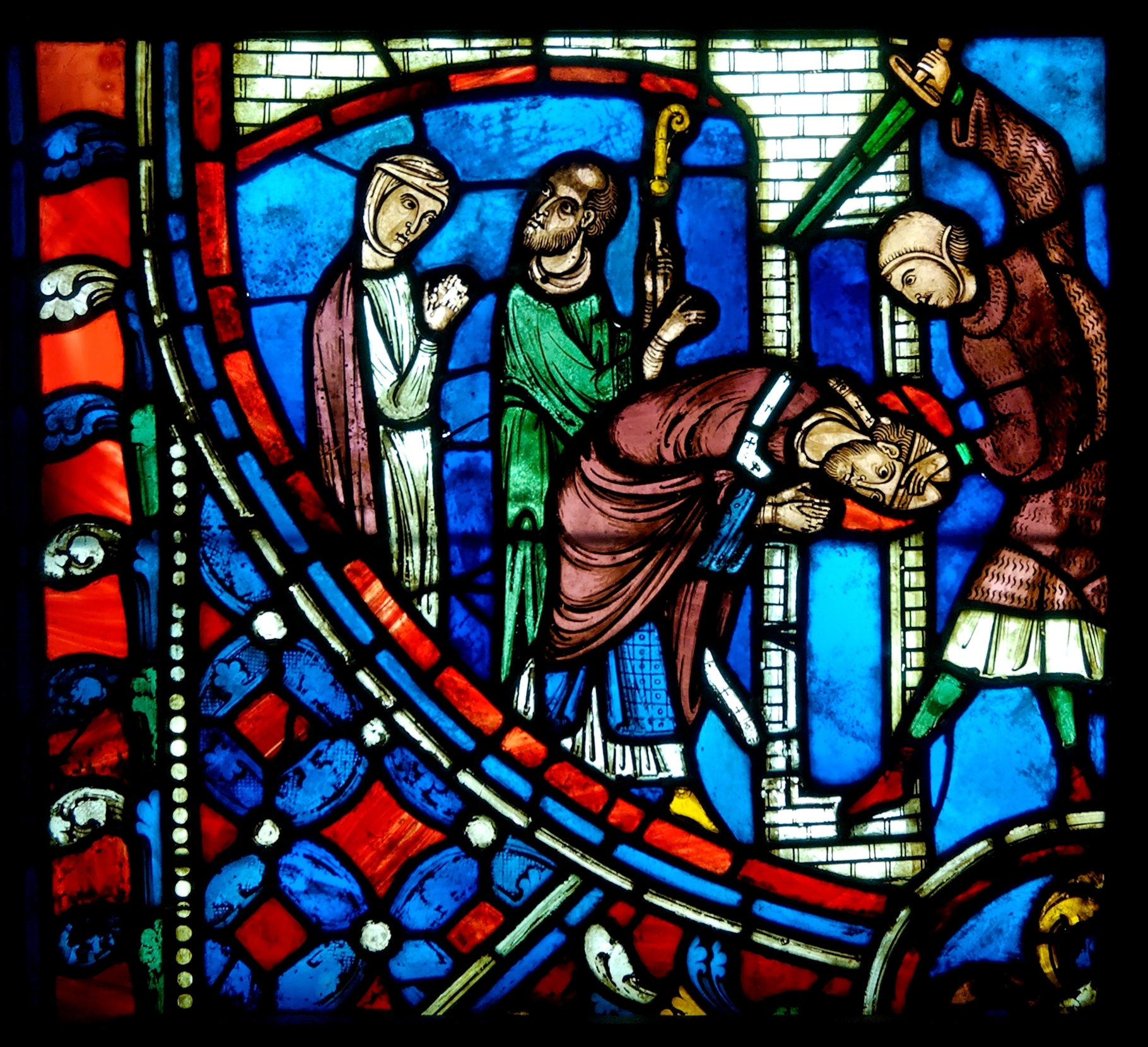
The martyrdom of St Nicasius

- Saint Acisclus – according to local tradition
- Saint Agapitus – according to legend
- Saint Agnes – according to legend mentioned by the fourth century Saint Ambrose
- Saint Alban (around 304) – executed in Roman Britain for converting to Christianity, according to tradition
- Saint Andrew Kim (1846) – beheaded in Korea for being Christian
- Saint Ansanus – according to legend
- Saint Anthimus of Rome – according to legend
- Saint Barbara – according to legend
- Saint Catherine of Alexandria – according to tradition
- Saint Christopher – according to legend
- Saint Columba of Spain – according to local tradition
- Saint Columba of France – according to legend
- Saint Columba (the Virgin) of Cornwall, England – according to legend
- Saints Cosmas and Damian (c.287) – executed in purge of Christians in Syria, according to tradition
- Saint Cyprian (258) – Bishop of Carthage, North Africa – Christian Martyr executed in the persecution ordered by Emperor Valerian
- Saint Denis – according to legend, which states that he carried his head to his final resting place, a familiar hagiographical trope (see Cephalophore)
- Saint Diomedes – according to legend
- Saint Dorothea of Alexandria – according to legend
- Saint Dymphna – according to tradition
- Saint Emmeram – according to legend
- Saint Eurosia – according to tradition
- Saint Felicitas of Rome – according to legend
- Saints Felix and Nabor – according to tradition
- Saints Firmus and Rusticus – according to tradition
- Saint George – according to legend
- Saint Gereon – according to legend
- Saint Gordianus – according to tradition
- Saint James – according to the Acts of the Apostles
- Saint Marcellus – according to tradition
- Saint Maximilian of Tebessa (295) – executed by Romans for conscientious objection to military service, according to tradition
- Saint Nicasius of Rheims, at Rheims (407) – executed by Vandals during conquest of Rheims, according to tradition
- Saint Pancras – according to legend
- Apostle Paul – traditionally
- Saint Peter of Rates – according to tradition
- Saint Polyeuctus – according to tradition
- Saint Quiteria – according to legend
- Saints Rufina and Secunda – according to legend
- Saints Simplicius and Faustinus – according to legend
- Saint Solange – according to legend
- Saint Typasius – according to legend
- Saint Urith of Chittlehampton, Devon, England – according to legend
- Saint Venantius, at Camerino – according to tradition
- Saint Winefride of Flintshire in Wales – according to legend
- Saint Demiana – according to tradition

=== Greek mythology ===
- Medusa – a Gorgon beheaded by Perseus
- Argus Panoptes – beheaded by Mercury in order to rescue Io

=== Sikh ===
- Guru Tegh Bahadur (1675) – for refusing to convert to Islam
- Baba Deep Singh (1757) – in the Battle of Amritsar
- 1000 Sikhs (1746) – executed by Zakariya Khan Bahadur in Lahore
- 3 Sikhs (2010) - executed by Pakistani Taliban

=== Hindu ===
- Karna – in the epic war of Mahabharata
- Drona – in the epic war of Mahabharata
- Rakthabeeja – by goddess Kali to eradicate the evil from the earth
- Jayadratha – in the epic war of Mahabharata

== See also ==
- List of prisoners of the Tower of London
- Maiden (guillotine), also known as "The Maiden" or "The Scottish Maiden"
- Tower Hill
