= Civil religion =

Manifestation of religious values inherent to nations

Civil religion, also referred to as a civic religion, is the implicit religious values of a nation, as expressed through public rituals, symbols (such as the national flag), and ceremonies on sacred days and at sacred places (such as monuments, battlefields, or national cemeteries). It is distinct from churches, although church officials and ceremonies are sometimes incorporated into the practice of civil religion. Countries described as having a civil religion include France and the United States. As a concept, it originated in French political thought and became a major topic for U.S. sociologists since its use by Robert Bellah in 1960.

== Origin of term ==
Jean-Jacques Rousseau coined the term in chapter 8, book 4 of The Social Contract (1762), to describe what he regarded as the moral and spiritual foundation essential for any modern society. For Rousseau, civil religion was intended simply as a form of social cement, helping to unify the state by providing it with sacred authority. In his book, Rousseau outlines the simple dogmas of the civil religion:

1. deity
2. afterlife
3. the reward of virtue and the punishment of vice
4. the exclusion of religious intolerance

The Italian historian Emilio Gentile has studied the roots and development of the concept and proposed a division of two types of religions of politics: a civil religion and a political religion.

== Sociology of religion ==
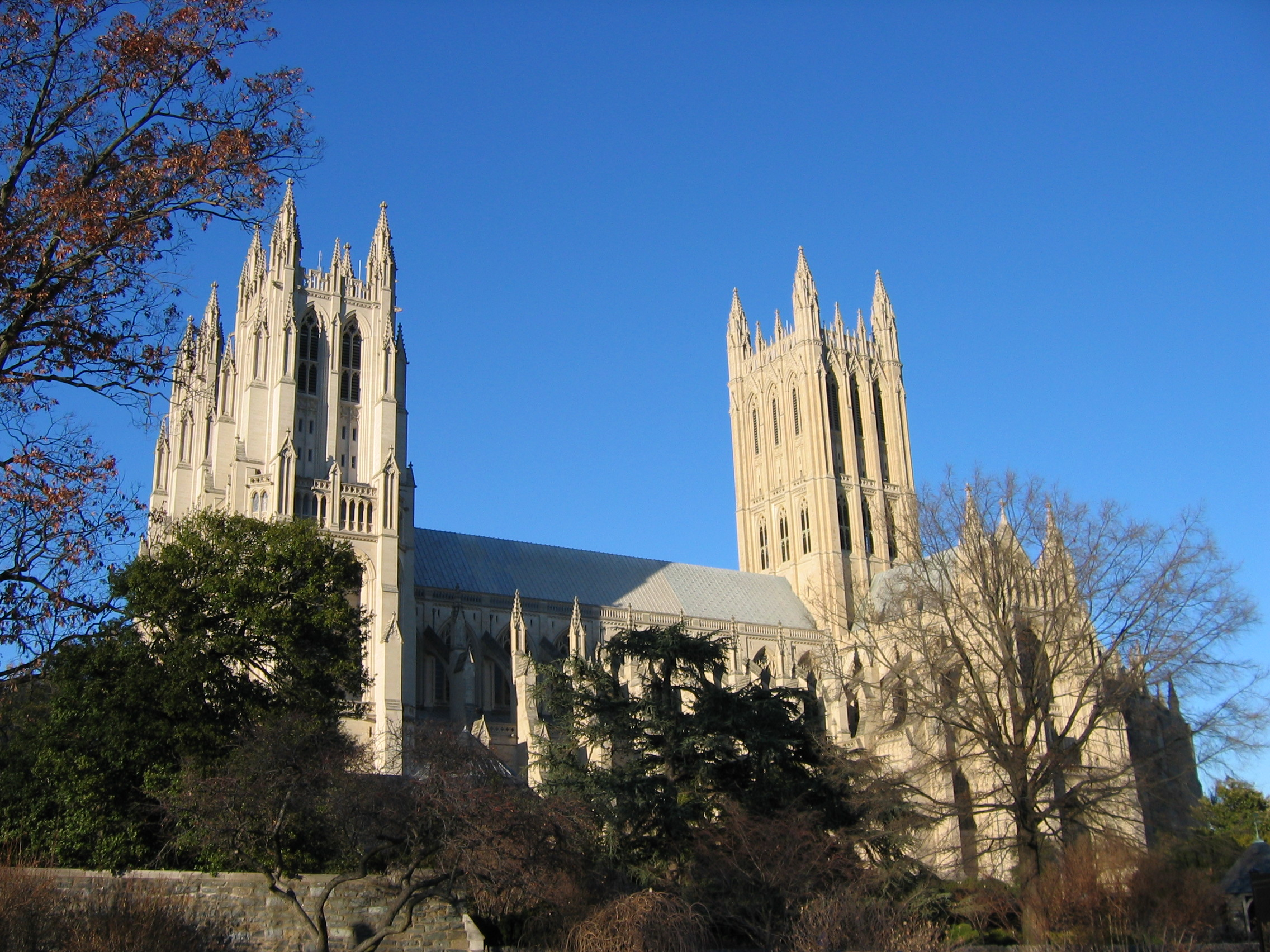
The Washington National Cathedral in Washington, DC, is often used for state funerals for political leaders.

Civil religion stands somewhat above folk religion in its social and political status, since by definition it suffuses an entire society, or at least a segment of a society; and is often practiced by leaders within that society. It is somewhat less than an establishment of religion, since established churches have official clergy and a relatively fixed and formal relationship with the government that establishes them. Civil religion is usually practiced by political leaders who are laypeople and whose leadership is not specifically spiritual.

=== Examples ===
Such civil religion encompasses such things as:

- the invocation of God(s) in political speeches and public monuments;
- the quotation of religious texts on public occasions by political leaders;
- the veneration of past political leaders;
- the use of the lives of these leaders to teach moral ideals;
- the veneration of veterans and casualties of a nation's wars;
- religious gatherings called by political leaders;
- the use of religious symbols on public buildings;
- the use of public buildings for worship;
- founding myths and other national myths

and similar religious or quasi-religious practices.

== Practical political philosophy ==
The Arc de Triomphe in Paris commemorates those who died in France's wars.

Professional commentators on political and social matters writing in newspapers and magazines sometimes use the term civil religion or civic religion to refer to ritual expressions of patriotism of a sort practiced in all countries, not always including religion in the conventional sense of the word.

Among such practices are the following:

- crowds singing the national anthem at certain public gatherings;
- parades or display of the national flag on certain patriotic holidays;
- reciting oaths of allegiance (like the pledges of allegiance found in countries such as the United States, Bahamas, the Philippines, and South Korea);
- ceremonies concomitant to the inauguration of a president or the coronation of a monarch;
- retelling exaggerated, one-sided, and simplified mythologized tales of national founders and other great leaders or great events (e.g., battles, mass migrations) in the past (in this connection, see also romantic nationalism);
- monuments commemorating great leaders of the past or historic events;
- monuments to dead soldiers or annual ceremonies to remember them;
- expressions of reverence for the state, the predominant national racial/ethnic group, the national constitution, or the monarch or head of state;
- expressions of solidarity with people perceived as being national kindred but residing in a foreign country or a foreign country perceived as being similar enough to the nation to warrant admiration and/or loyalty;
- expressions of hatred towards another country or foreign ethnic group perceived as either currently being an enemy of the state and/or as having wronged and slighted the nation in the past;
- public display of the coffin of a recently deceased political leader.

== Relation between the two conceptions ==
These two conceptions (sociological and political) of civil religion substantially overlap. In Britain, where church and state are constitutionally joined, the monarch's coronation is an elaborate religious rite celebrated by the Archbishop of Canterbury. In France, secular ceremonies are separated from religious observances to a greater degree than in most countries. In the United States, a president being inaugurated is told by the Constitution to choose between saying "I do solemnly swear..." (customarily followed by "so help me God", although those words are not Constitutionally required) and saying "I do solemnly affirm..." (in which latter case no mention of God would be expected).

== History ==
=== Prehistory and classical antiquity ===
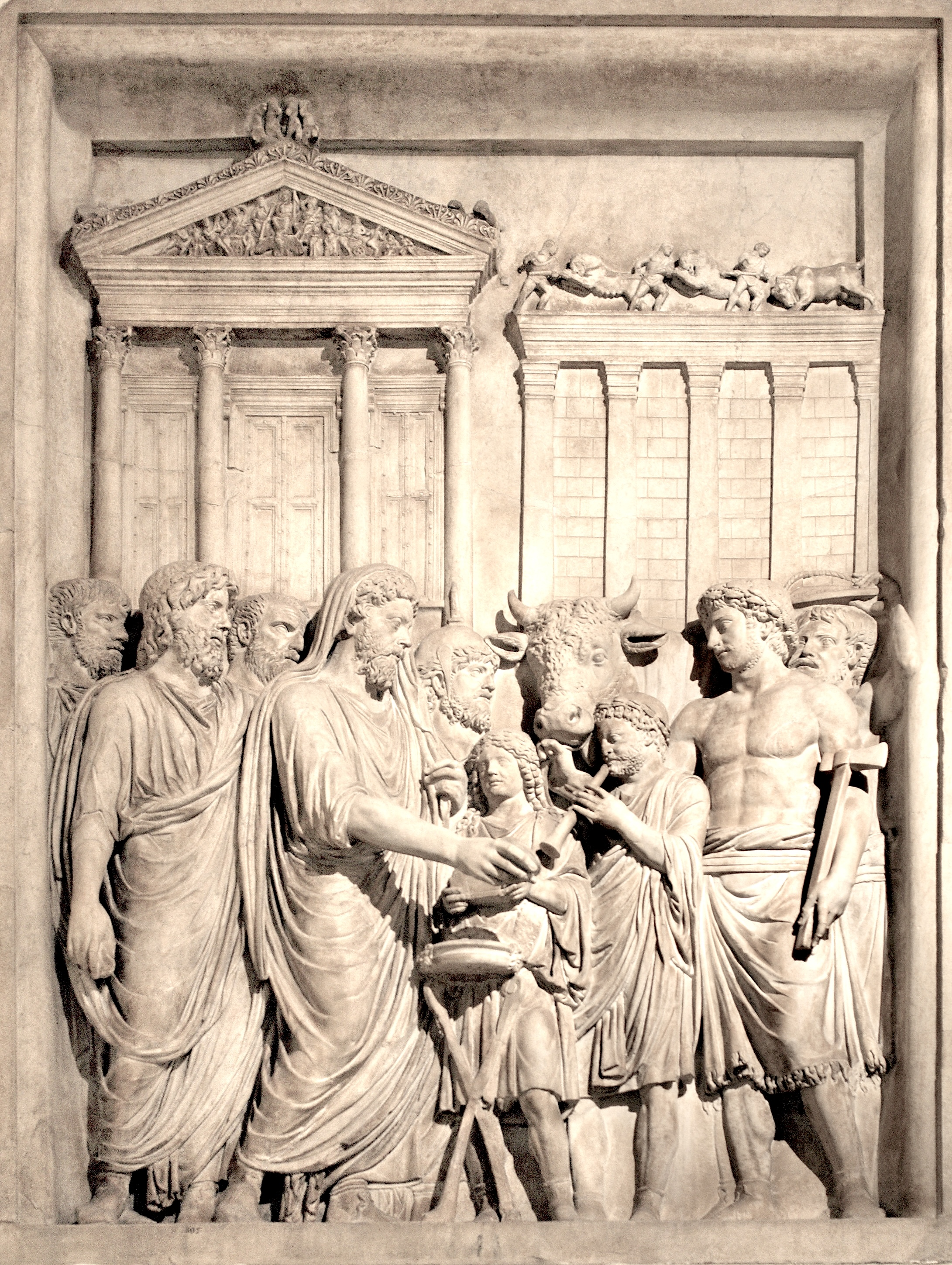
The emperor Marcus Aurelius, his head ritually covered, conducts a public sacrifice at the Temple of Jupiter

Practically all the ancient and prehistoric reigns suffused politics with religion. Often the leaders, such as the Pharaoh or the Chinese Emperor were considered manifestations of a Divinity. Tribal world-views was often Pantheistic, the tribe being an extension of its surrounding nature and the leaders having roles and symbols derived from the animal hierarchy and significant natural phenomena (such as storm).

The religion of the Athenian polis was a secular polytheism focused on the Olympian Gods and was celebrated in the civic festivals. Religion was a matter of state and the Athenian Ecclesia deliberated on matters of religion. Atheism and the introduction of foreign gods were forbidden in Athens and punishable by death. For example, the Athenian ecclesia charged that Socrates worshiped gods other than those sanctioned by the polis and condemned him to death.

Rome also had a civil religion, whose first Emperor Augustus officially attempted to revive the dutiful practice of classical paganism. Greek and Roman religion were essentially local in character; the Roman Empire attempted to unite its disparate territories by inculcating an ideal of Roman piety, and by a syncretistic identifying of the gods of conquered territories with the Greek and Roman pantheon. In this campaign, Augustus erected monuments such as the Ara Pacis, the Altar of Peace, showing the Emperor and his family worshiping the gods. He also encouraged the publication of works such as Virgil's Æneid, which depicted "pious Æneas", the legendary ancestor of Rome, as a role model for Roman religiosity. Roman historians such as Livy told tales of early Romans as morally improving stories of military prowess and civic virtue. The Roman civil religion later became centered on the person of the Emperor through the Imperial cult, the worship of the genius of the Emperor.

=== Rousseau and Durkheim ===
The phrase civil religion was first discussed extensively by Jean-Jacques Rousseau in his 1762 treatise The Social Contract. Rousseau defined civil religion as a group of religious beliefs he believed to be universal, and which he believed governments had a right to uphold and maintain: belief in a deity; belief in an afterlife in which virtue is rewarded and vice punished; and belief in religious tolerance. He said the dogmas of civil religion should be simple, few in number, and stated in precise words without interpretations or commentaries. Beyond that, Rousseau affirmed that individuals' religious opinions should be beyond the reach of governments. For Rousseau civil religion was to be constructed and imposed from the top down as an artificial source of civic virtue. Attempts to implement Rousseau's theories during the French Revolution resulted in various grass-roots and state-sponsored civic religions. The atheistic Cult of Reason arose from the radical dechristianization campaign, while its successor, the deistic Cult of the Supreme Being, was established by Maximilien Robespierre to counter atheism and promote civic virtue. Other examples included the Decadary Cult and Theophilanthropy. Some scholars critiqued and accused Rousseau's civil religion of inspiring figurative "self worship" amongst citizenry.

Wallace studies Émile Durkheim (1858–1917), the French sociologist who analysed civil religion, especially in comparative terms, and stressed that the public schools are critical in implementing civil religion. Although he never used the term he laid great stress on the concept.

== Examples ==
=== Australia ===
Writing in 1965 on the fiftieth anniversary of the 1915 Landing at Anzac Cove, Australian historian Geoffrey Serle noted: "Two generations of Australians have had it drummed in from rostrum and pulpit that we became a nation on 25 April 1915 or at least during the First World War." This date is now commemorated as Anzac Day.

Michael Gladwin has argued that for Australians Anzac Day "functions as a kind of alternative religion, or 'civil religion', with its own sense of the mystical, transcendent and divine", while Carolyn Holbrook has observed that after 1990 Anzac Day commemoration was "repackaged" as a protean "story of national genesis" that could flexibly accommodate a wide spectrum of Australians. According to Gladwin, "The emphasis of Anzac Day is no longer on military skills but rather values of unpretentious courage, endurance, sacrifice in the midst of suffering, and mateship. Anzac Day provides universally recognised symbols and rituals to enshrine transcendent elements of Australia's historical experience, making it a quasi-religion, or at least a 'civil religion'."

=== France ===
Secular states in Europe by the late 19th century were building civil religion based on their recent histories. In France's case, Baylac argues, the French government

encouraged a veritable state religion, worshiping the flag and multiplying the national holidays and commemorative monuments. ... July 14 became a national holiday in 1882; the centennial of the French Revolution was celebrated in 1889. In Italy, the secular state multiplied the celebrations: State holidays, King and Queen's birthdays, pilgrimage of 1884 to the tomb of Victor-Emmanuel II. A patriotic ideology was created.

=== Soviet Union ===
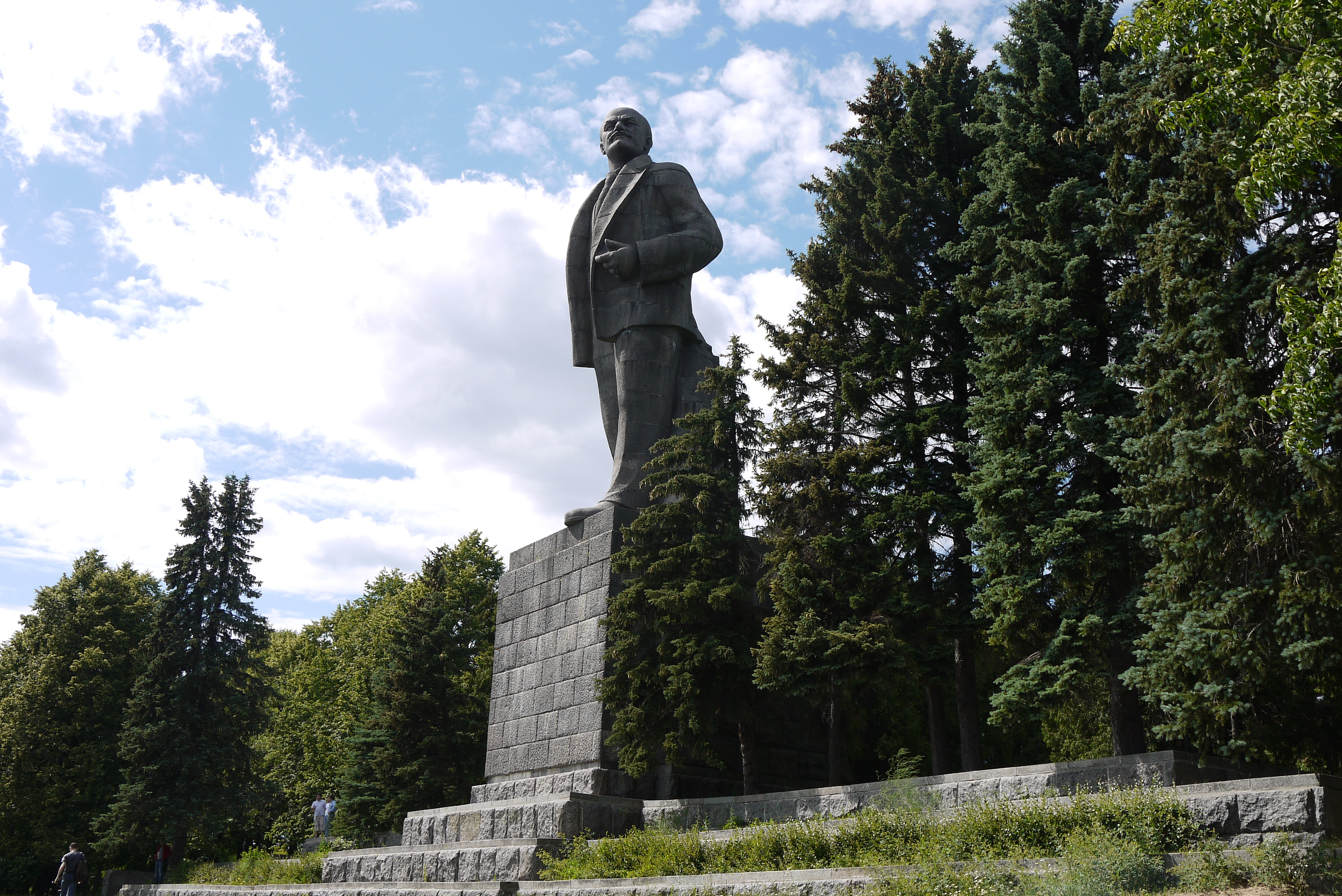
Statue of Lenin at Dubna, Russia, built in 1937; it is 25 metres tall

The Soviet Union made Marxism–Leninism into a civil religion, with sacred texts and many statues of Marx, Lenin, and Stalin. Stalin personally supervised the cult of Lenin and his own cult, which took advantage of the historic semi-religious adulation Russian peasants had shown toward the tsars. The Lenin icons were put into storage when communism fell in 1991. The Stalin statues had been removed in the 1950s and mention of him was erased from encyclopedias and history books. However under Vladimir Putin in the 21st century the memory of Stalin has been partly rehabilitated in search of a strong leader who made the nation powerful. For example, school textbooks were rewritten to portray "the mass terror of the Stalin years as essential to the country's rapid modernization in the face of growing German and Japanese military threats, and amid the inaction or duplicity of the Western democracies."

=== United States ===
Civil religion is an important component of public life in America, especially at the national level for its celebration of nationalism. Sociologists report that its "feast days" are Thanksgiving, Veterans Day, and Memorial Day. Its rituals include salutes to the flag and singing "God Bless America". Soldiers and veterans play a central role of standing ready to sacrifice their lives to preserve the nation. Bellah noted the veneration of veterans. The historian Conrad Cherry called the Memorial Day ceremonies "a modern cult of the dead" and says that it "affirms the civil religious tenets".

==== American Revolution ====
The American Revolution was the main source of the civil religion that has shaped patriotism ever since. According to the sociologist Robert Bellah:

Behind the civil religion at every point lie biblical archetypes: Exodus, Chosen People, Promised Land, New Jerusalem, and Sacrificial Death and Rebirth. But it is also genuinely American and genuinely new. It has its own prophets and its own martyrs, its own sacred events and sacred places, its own solemn rituals and symbols. It is concerned that America be a society as perfectly in accord with the will of God as men can make it, and a light to all nations.

Albanese argues that the American Revolution was the main source of the non-denominational American civil religion that has shaped patriotism and the memory and meaning of the nation's birth ever since. Battles are not central (as they are for the Civil War) but rather certain events and people have been celebrated as icons of certain virtues (or vices). As historians have noted, the Revolution produced a Moses-like leader (George Washington), prophets (Thomas Jefferson, Thomas Paine) and martyrs (Boston Massacre, Nathan Hale), as well as devils (Benedict Arnold), sacred places (Valley Forge, Bunker Hill), rituals (Boston Tea Party), emblems (the new flag), sacred holidays (July 4) and a holy scripture whose every sentence is carefully studied and applied in current law cases (the Declaration of Independence, the Constitution, and the Bill of Rights).

Although God is not mentioned in the Constitution of the United States of America, mention is specifically made of "Nature's God" in the opening sentence of the Declaration of Independence.

==== Historiography ====
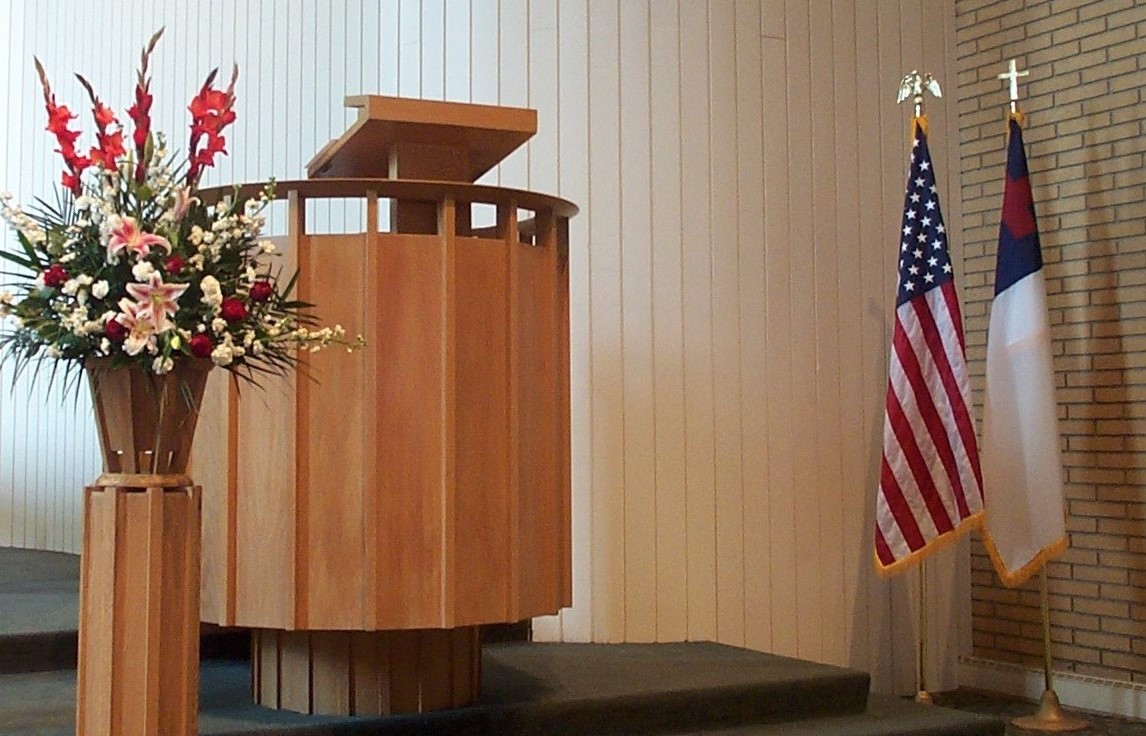
The Christian flag displayed alongside the flag of the United States next to the pulpit in a church in California. Note the eagle and cross finials on the flag poles.

In the 1960s and 1970s, scholars such as Robert N. Bellah and Martin E. Marty studied civil religion as a cultural phenomenon, attempting to identify the actual tenets of civil religion in the United States, or to study civil religion as a phenomenon of cultural anthropology. Within this American context, Marty wrote that Americans approved of "religion in general" without being particularly concerned about the content of that faith, and attempted to distinguish "priestly" and "prophetic" roles within the practice of American civil religion, which he preferred to call the public theology. In the 1967 essay "Civil Religion in America", Bellah wrote that civil religion in its priestly sense is "an institutionalized collection of sacred beliefs about the American nation". Bellah describes the prophetic role of civil religion as challenging "national self-worship" and calling for "the subordination of the nation to ethical principles that transcend it in terms of which it should be judged". Bellah identified the American Revolution, the Civil War, and the Civil Rights Movement as three decisive historical events that impacted the content and imagery of civil religion in the United States.

The application of the concept of civil religion to the United States was in large part the work of sociologist Robert Bellah. He identified an elaborate system of practices and beliefs arising from America's unique historic experience and religiosity. Civil religion in the US was originally Protestant but brought in Catholics and Jews after World War II. Having no association with any religious sect, civil religion was used in the 1960s to justify civil rights legislation. Americans ever since the colonial era talk of their obligation both collective and individual to carry out God's will on earth. George Washington was a sort of high priest, and the documents of the Founding Fathers have been treated as almost sacred texts. With the Civil War, says Bellah, came a new theme of death, sacrifice and rebirth, as expressed through Memorial Day rituals. Unlike France, the American civil religion was never anticlerical or militantly secular.

=== Asia ===
India has a civil religion of its own derived from the native concept of dharma. While secularism elsewhere means separation of church & state, secularism in India is significantly different from how it is understood in the Western world: Secularism in India means equal participation (& interference) of the government in all religions due to the deep influence of Indic religions, or more specifically Hinduism, the majority religion of the land, in shaping a distinctly Indian cultural identity. The Diplomat explains this phenomenon as India being a civilization state, whose government "sees itself not merely as a party to a social contract with its citizens, but as the guardian and promoter of a nation’s culture and traditions".

In China, the Confucian ritual religion may be considered civil religion.

== Current issues ==
This assertive civil religion of the United States is an occasional cause of political friction between the US and Europe, where the literally religious form of civil religion has largely faded away in recent decades. In the United States, civil religion is often invoked under the name of "Judeo-Christian ethics", a phrase originally intended to be maximally inclusive of the several religions practiced in the United States, assuming that these faiths all share the same values. Alvin J. Schmidt argues that since the 1700s, expressions of civil religion in the United States have shifted from a deistic to a polytheistic stance.

Some scholars have argued that the American flag can be seen as a main totem of a national cult, while others have argued that modern punishment is a form of civil religion. Arguing against mob violence and lynching, Abraham Lincoln declared in his 1838 Lyceum speech that the Constitution and the laws of the United States ought to become the "political religion" of each American.

== See also ==
- Secular religion
- Ceremonial deism
- Civic virtue
- Deep England
- Flag desecration
- Juche
- Marianne
- Secular state
- Secularism
- State religion
- Sociological classifications of religious movements § Church and ecclesia
