= Decadary Cult =

Semi-official religion of France during the Directory period

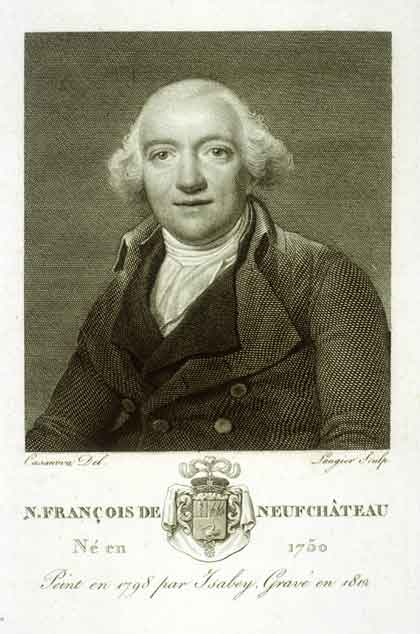
François de Neufchâteau established the Decadary Cult as a semi-official state religion by decree on 6 September 1798.

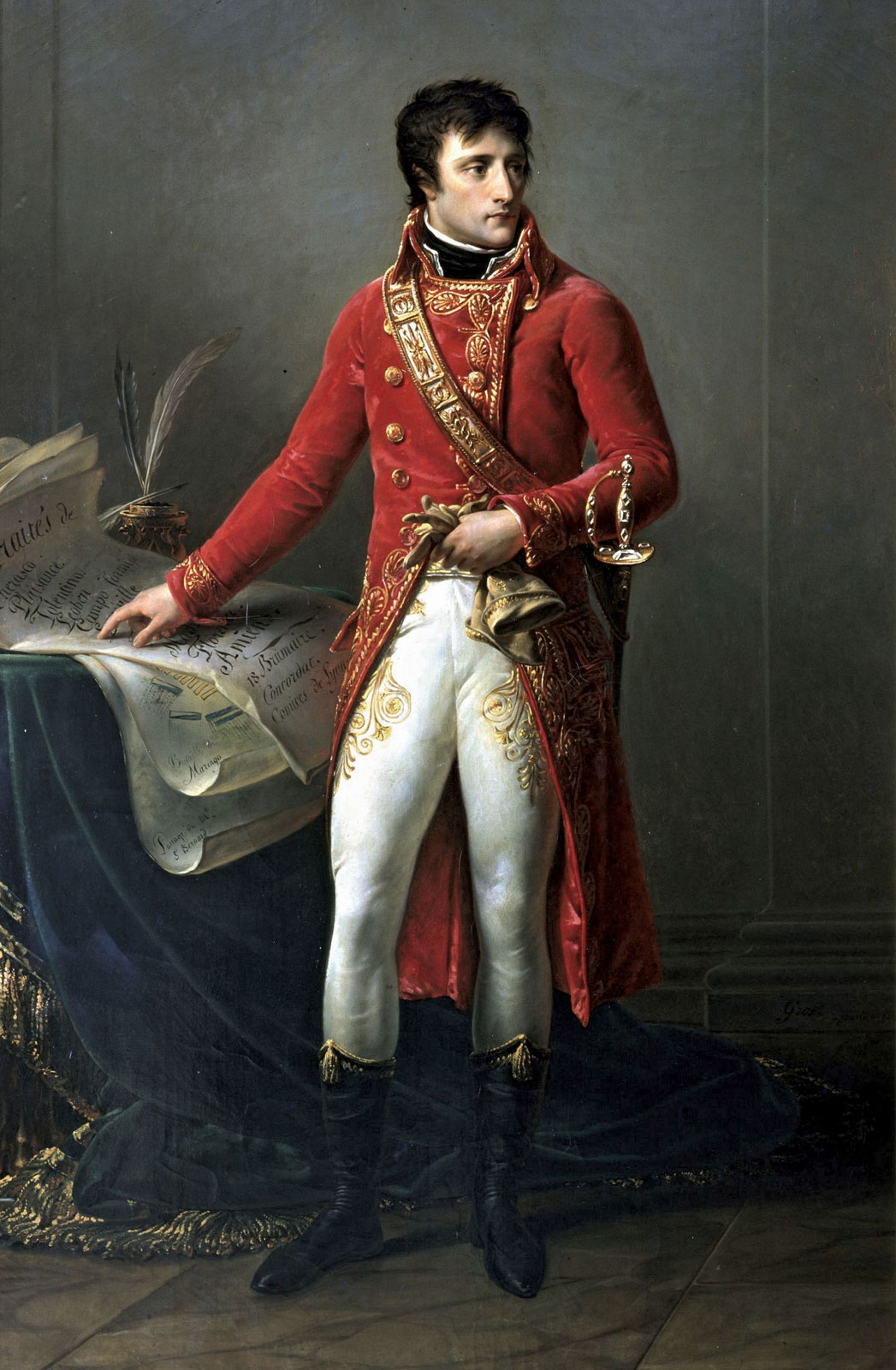
After his ascent to power as First Consul in 1799, Napoleon Bonaparte ended the Decadary Cult and re-established the Catholic Church as the primary religion in France.

The Decadary Cult (French: Culte décadaire), also called the Cult of the décadi or Tenth-day Cult, was a semi-official religion of France during the Directory period of the French Revolution, intended as a dechristianised replacement of the Christian Sunday worship with a quasi-religious festival on the day of rest in the 10-day week of the French Republican Calendar.

The Decadary Cult was a system of worship based on festivals, so-called fêtes décadaires, which were celebrated every décadi, the day of rest in the 10-day week of the Republican calendar. In addition, there was a cycle of annual festivals, celebrating various themes such as youth, old age, the foundation of the French Republic and the execution of Louis XVI. The festivals included the singing of patriotic songs, banquets, games, and the presentation of awards. The festivals were highly politicised, patriotic events, intended to promote Republican norms and values among the populace.

== History ==
The French revolutionary period saw a number of attempts to establish a quasi-official civil religion, despite the formal separation of state and religion enshrined in the 1795 Constitution of the Year III. These included Robespierre's Cult of the Supreme Being, the Cult of Reason and, during the later post-Terror period, the Decadary Cult and Theophilanthropy.

The fêtes décadaires rose to popularity after the adoption of the Republican Calendar in October 1793. Jean-Baptiste Matthieu, a member of the Committee on Public Instruction, presented draft legislation which called for local celebrations throughout France on all 36 décadis of the year. Robespierre enthusiastically adopted Matthieu's plan and led a grand festival devoted to his deistic Cult of the Supreme Being on 8 June 1794, the décadi of 20 Prairial of the Year II.

The Decadary Cult was officially established by the laws of 17 Thermidor (4 August 1798), 3 Fructidor (20 August) and 23 Fructidor (9 September), and by decree of François de Neufchâteau on 20 Fructidor (6 September 1798). However, it soon became overtaken by Theophilanthropy, a deistic sect promoted by Louis Marie de La Révellière-Lépeaux which quickly gained popularity following the Coup of 18 Fructidor in 1797. After the Coup of 30 Prairial VII and De La Révellière's resignation from the Directory in 1799, Theophilanthropy fell from favour and there was a return to the original form of the Decadary Cult.

Napoleon Bonaparte's ascent to power with the Coup of 18 Brumaire and establishment of the Consulate in 1799 effectively ended the Decadary Cult, as Napoleon moved to re-establish the Roman Catholic Church in the years following, leading to the Concordat of 1801. A decree on 7 Thermidor of the Year VIII (26 July 1800) ended the cult for French citizens; only government officials were still required to attend these events. The temples of the cult were deserted, and only two national holidays continued to be observed: 14 July (Bastille Day) and 1 Vendemiaire (New Year's Day in the Republican calendar). However, these were no longer used to promote Republican values. Napoleon abolished the Republican calendar in 1805.
