= National religion =

National religion may refer to:

- State religion
- National church
- Ethnic religion

== See also ==
- Civil religion
