= Dechristianization of France during the French Revolution =

Anti-Christian policy during the French Revolution

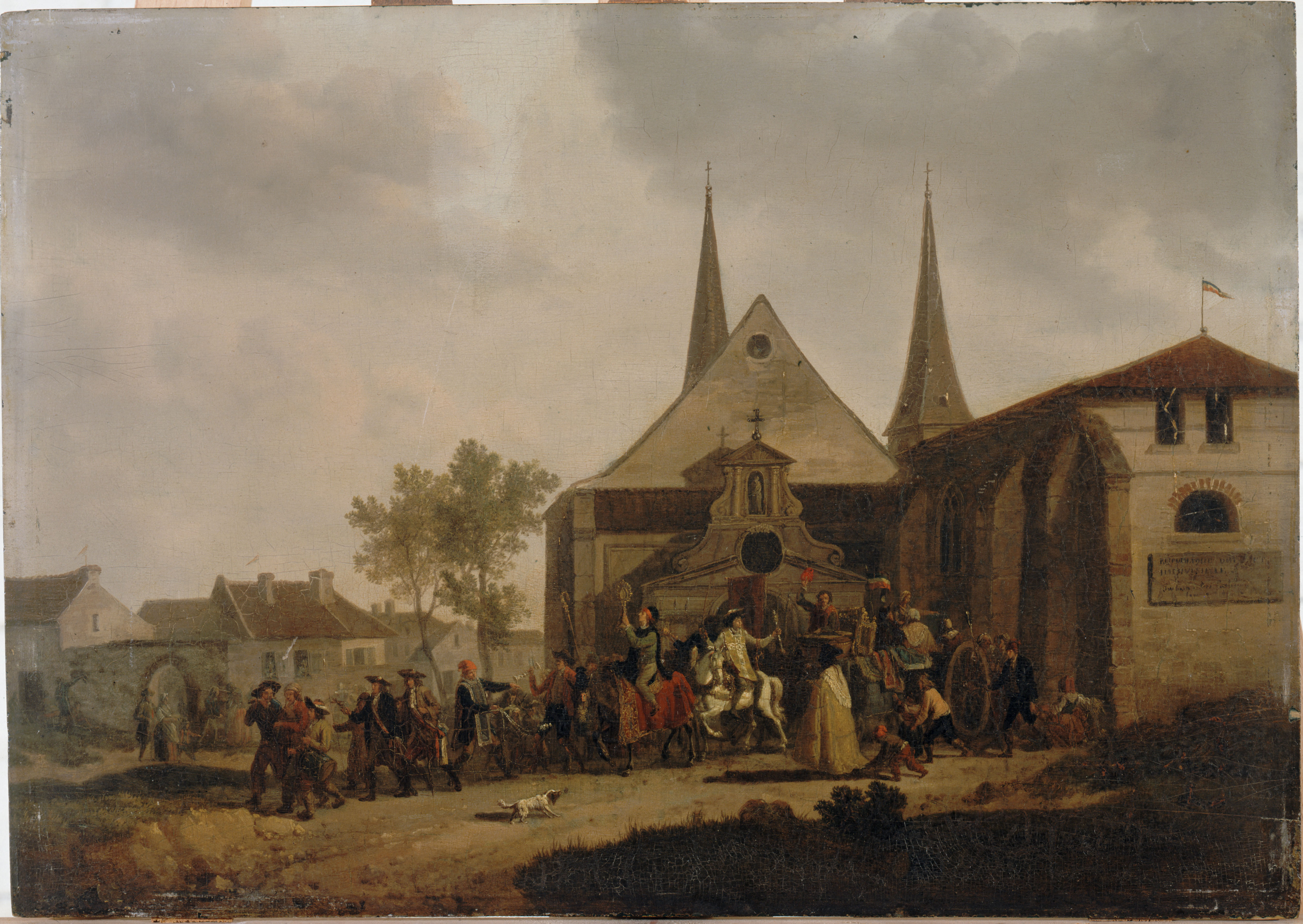
Looting of a church during the Revolution, by Swebach-Desfontaines (c. 1793)

The aim of several policies conducted by various governments of France during the French Revolution ranged from the appropriation by the government of the great landed estates and the large amounts of money held by the Catholic Church to the termination of Christian religious practice and of the religion itself. There has been much scholarly debate over whether the movement was popularly motivated or motivated by a small group of revolutionary radicals. These policies, which ended with the Concordat of 1801, formed the basis of the later and less radical laïcité policies.

The French Revolution saw numerous attacks on Church corruption and the wealth of the higher clergy, an action with which even many Christians could identify, since the Gallican Church held a dominant role in pre-revolutionary France. During a one-year period known as the Reign of Terror, the episodes of anti-clericalism became some of the most violent of any in modern European history. The revolutionary authorities suppressed the Church, abolished the monarchy, nationalized Church property, exiled 30,000 priests, and killed hundreds more. In October 1793, the Christian calendar was replaced with one reckoned from the date of the Revolution, and Festivals of Liberty, Reason, and the Supreme Being were scheduled. New forms of moral religion emerged, including the deistic Cult of the Supreme Being and the atheistic Cult of Reason, with the revolutionary government briefly mandating observance of the former in April 1794.

== Background ==
=== Before 1789 ===
In 18th-century France, the vast majority of the population adhered to the Catholic Church, the only religion officially allowed in the kingdom since the revocation of the Edict of Nantes in 1685. Small minorities of French Protestants (mostly Huguenots and German Lutherans in Alsace) and Jews still lived in France. The Edict of Versailles, commonly known as the Edict of Tolerance, had been signed by Louis XVI on 7 November 1787. It did not give non-Catholics in France the right to openly practice their religions but only the rights to legal and civil status, which included the right to contract marriages without having to convert to the Catholic faith. At the same time, libertine thinkers had popularized atheism and anti-clericalism.

The ancien régime institutionalised the authority of the clergy in its status as the First Estate of the realm. As part of this "ancient regime" of governance, the Catholic Church controlled an estimated six percent (though some suggest as high as ten or twenty-five percent) of the total territory of France and extracted revenues from its tenants in both rent and the tithe -- a ten percent tax on agricultural products. At the outbreak of revolution in 1789, the Church's revenue was estimated -- and possibly exaggerated -- to be 150 million livres. Since the Church kept the registry of births, deaths, and marriages and was the only institution that provided hospitals and education in most parts of the country, it influenced all subjects of the French Kingdom, regardless of their religious affiliation.

=== Between 1789 and 1792 ===
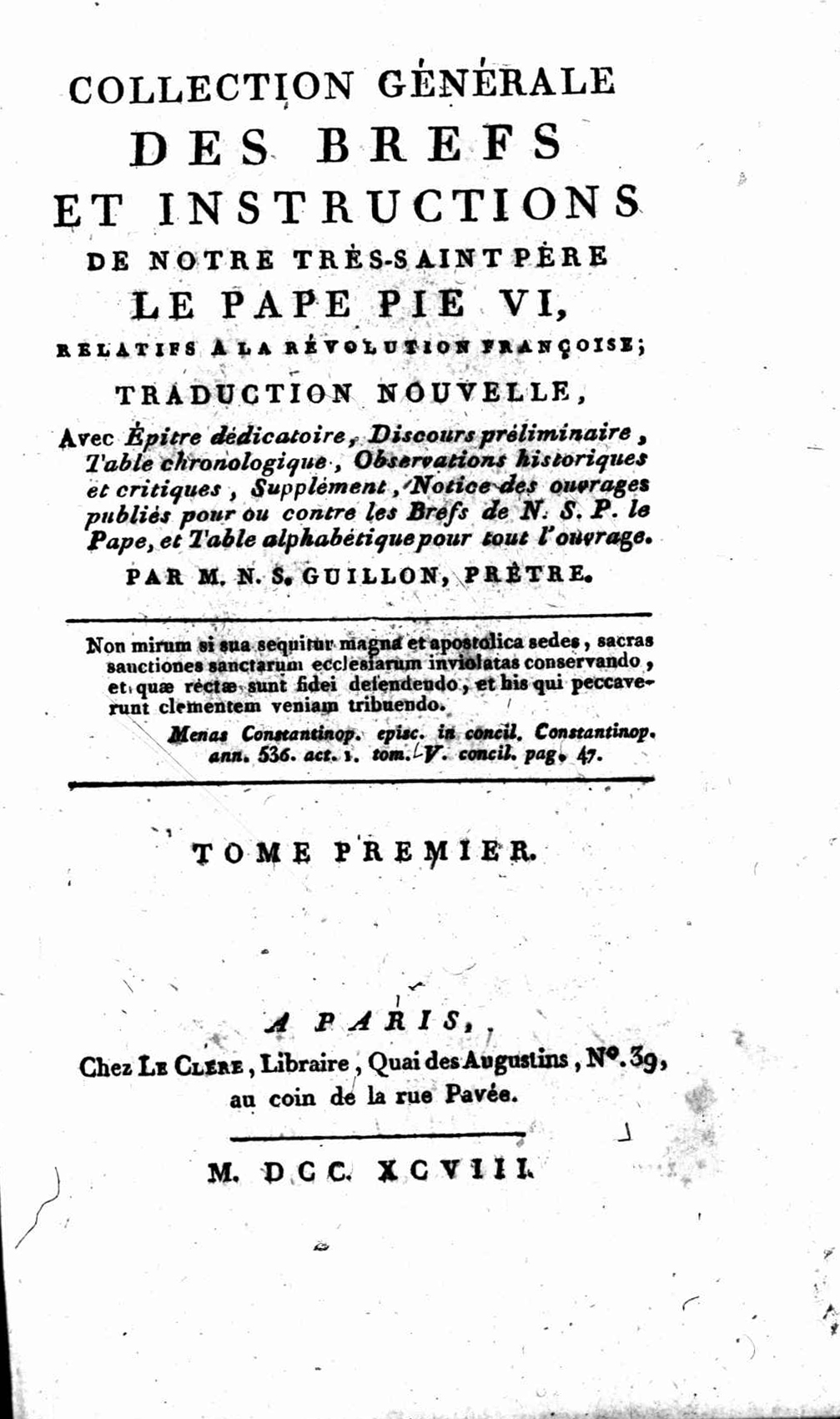
General collection of writs and instructions relating to the French Revolution (Collection generale des brefs et instructions relatifs a la revolution francoise) of Pope Pius VI, 1798

A milestone event of the French Revolution was the abolition of the privileges of the First and Second Estate on the night of 4 August 1789. In particular, it abolished the tithes gathered by the Catholic clergy.

The Declaration of the Rights of Man and Citizen of 1789 proclaimed freedom of religion across France in these terms:

Article IV – Liberty consists of doing anything which does not harm others: thus, the exercise of the natural rights of each man has only those borders which assure other members of the society the enjoyment of these same rights. These borders can be determined only by the law.

Article X – No one may be disturbed for his opinions, even religious ones, provided that their manifestation does not trouble the public order established by the law.

On 10 October 1789, the National Constituent Assembly seized the properties and land held by the Catholic Church and decided to sell them to fund the assignat revolutionary currency. On 12 July 1790, the assembly passed the Civil Constitution of the Clergy that subordinated the Catholic Church in France to the French government. It was never accepted by the Pope and other high-ranking clergy in Rome.

== Policies of the revolutionary authorities ==
The programme of dechristianization waged against Catholicism, and eventually against all forms of Christianity, included:

- destruction of statues, plates and other iconography from places of worship
- destruction of crosses, bells and other external signs of worship
- the institution of revolutionary and civic cults
- the enactment of a law on 21 October 1793 making all nonjuring priests and all persons who harbored them liable to death on sight

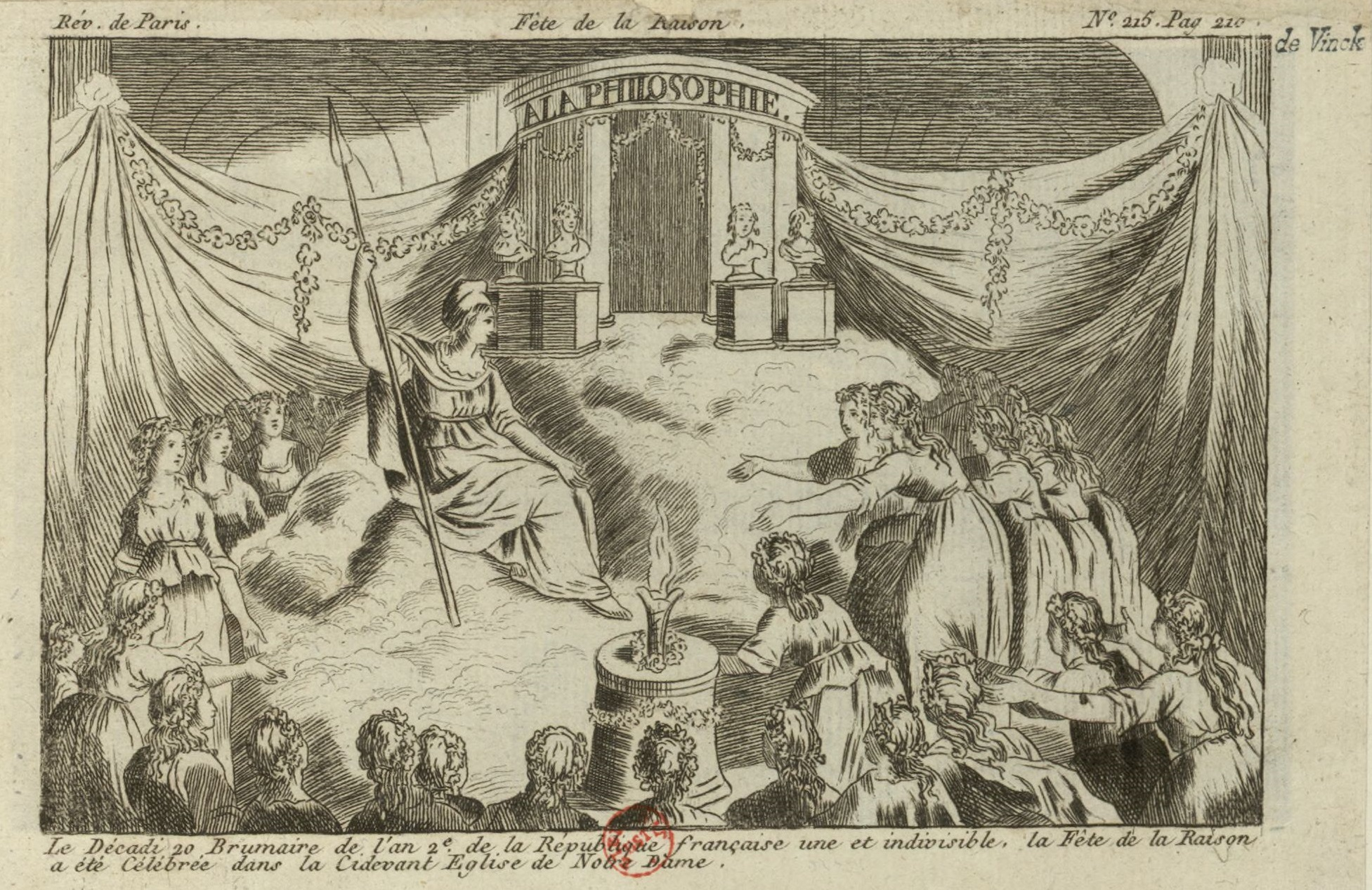
Fête de la Raison ("Festival of Reason"), Notre Dame, Paris, 10 November 1793

An especially notable event that took place in the course of France's dechristianization was the Festival of Reason, which was held in Notre Dame Cathedral on 10 November 1793. The dechristianization campaign can be seen as the logical extension of the materialist philosophies of some leaders of the Enlightenment such as Voltaire, while for others with more prosaic concerns it provided an opportunity to unleash resentments against the Catholic Church (in the spirit of conventional anti-clericalism) and its clergy.

== Civic religions of the French Revolution ==
The civic religions of the French Revolution were a series of state-sponsored deistic and atheistic belief systems introduced during the French Revolution and intended to replace Catholicism as the new moral and social framework of the French First Republic. Emerging from the radical policy of dechristianization, these religions sought to ground republican citizenship in rational, civic, and patriotic principles. The most prominent of these were the atheistic Cult of Reason (Culte de la Raison), which was succeeded by the deistic Cult of the Supreme Being (Culte de l'Être suprême) established by Maximilien Robespierre. During the Directory, these were followed by the semi-official Decadary Cult (Culte décadaire) and the private initiative of Theophilanthropy (Théophilanthropie). These movements aimed to inculcate civic virtue through secular morality, public festivals, and symbolic art. None succeeded in displacing established religious practice, and official support was terminated by Napoleon Bonaparte under the Concordat of 1801.

=== Rationale ===
The French Revolution's initial religious policy was not to abolish religion but to subordinate the Gallican Church to the state through measures like the 1790 Civil Constitution of the Clergy. Following the overthrow of the monarchy in 1792, a more radical dechristianization campaign emerged, championed by factions such as the Hébertists. This campaign involved closing churches, destroying religious iconography, and persecuting priests. Public life was systematically secularised through the introduction of the French Republican Calendar, which replaced the Gregorian calendar's system of Sundays and Christian feast days with a ten-day week (décade). In this context, revolutionaries created civic religions designed to provide a new, shared moral framework for the Republic.

== Civic religions ==
=== Cult of Reason ===
The Cult of Reason (Culte de la Raison) was an atheistic and anthropocentric civic creed promoted by radical figures like Jacques Hébert, Pierre Gaspard Chaumette, and Antoine-François Momoro. It rejected the existence of a god, venerating instead the abstract concept of Reason as the pinnacle of human achievement. Churches were converted into "Temples of Reason", and its most famous ceremony was the Festival of Reason at Notre-Dame de Paris in November 1793, where an actress personified the Goddess of Reason. The cult was opposed by the deist Maximilien Robespierre, who viewed its atheism as socially destructive and "aristocratic". It was officially suppressed following the execution of its leading proponents in March 1794 and rapidly disappeared from public life.

=== Cult of the Supreme Being ===
In response to the Cult of Reason, Maximilien Robespierre introduced the deistic Cult of the Supreme Being (Culte de l'Être suprême). Formally established by the National Convention in May 1794, it was based on the belief in a creator god and the immortality of the soul, which Robespierre considered essential for social order and republican virtue. The cult's sole major celebration was the massive Festival of the Supreme Being, held in Paris on 8 June 1794 and orchestrated by the artist Jacques-Louis David. The event, which prominently featured Robespierre, was seen by his rivals as an attempt to create a personal dictatorship and contributed to his political isolation. The movement was entirely dependent on its founder and was abandoned immediately following his execution in the Thermidorian Reaction in July 1794.

=== Decadary Cult ===
Established under the Directory, the Decadary Cult (Culte décadaire) was a secular civic religion designed to structure republican life around the ten-day week (décade) of the French Republican calendar. Citizens were legally required to observe the tenth day, the décadi, by attending civic festivals that replaced traditional Christian Sunday worship. These events aimed to instill republican virtues through patriotic ceremonies, readings of laws, and speeches on civic duty. Mandated nationally in 1798, the cult was unpopular and widely resisted by the general populace, who remained attached to the traditional seven-day week and Catholic traditions. It was effectively abandoned after the Concordat of 1801 restored Catholicism's status, and the Republican calendar itself was abolished by Napoleon in 1805.

=== Theophilanthropy ===
Theophilanthropy (Théophilanthropie, meaning "Friends of God and Man") was a deistic creed that emerged during the Directory as a private initiative. Founded by Jean-Baptiste Chemin-Dupontès and supported by the Director Louis Marie de La Révellière-Lépeaux, it sought to provide a rational moral framework based on the belief in God, the immortality of the soul, and civic duties. Its simple ceremonies, consisting of moral readings and hymns, often took place during the official décadi observances. As a voluntary, semi-private society, it stood apart from the state-mandated cults. However, it was viewed with suspicion by both Catholics, who saw it as a heretical sect, and radical republicans, who found it bourgeois and sentimental. The movement lost influence after the Concordat of 1801 and was formally prohibited in 1803.

== Legacy of the civic religions ==
Although the civic religions of the French Revolution were short-lived and failed to displace Catholicism, they represented a key experiment in the creation of secular civic ritual, symbolic politics, and republican pedagogy. Historians such as Mona Ozouf and Michel Vovelle have analyzed them as part of the Revolution's broader attempt to "transfer sacrality" from the traditional monarchy and church to the new republican state.

== The Revolution and the Church ==
In August 1789, the state cancelled the taxing power of the Church. The issue of Church property became central to the policies of the revolutionary government. Declaring that all Church property in France belonged to the nation, confiscations were ordered, and Church properties were sold at public auction. In July 1790 the National Constituent Assembly published the Civil Constitution of the Clergy that stripped clerics of their special rights—the clergy were to be made employees of the state, elected by their parish or bishopric, and the number of bishoprics was to be reduced—and required all priests and bishops to swear an oath of fidelity to the new order or face dismissal, deportation or death. French priests had to receive papal approval to sign such an oath, and Pope Pius VI spent almost eight months deliberating on the issue. On 13 April 1791, Pius denounced the constitution, resulting in a split in the French Catholic Church. Over 50% became abjuring priests ("jurors"), also known as "constitutional clergy", and nonjuring priests as "refractory clergy".

Map of France showing the percentage of juring priests in 1791. The borders of the map are those of 2007, because the data come from archives of the modern departments.

In September 1792, the Legislative Assembly legalized divorce, contrary to Catholic doctrine. At the same time, the state took control of the birth, death, and marriage registers away from the Church. An ever-increasing view that the Church was a counter-revolutionary force exacerbated the social and economic grievances, and violence erupted in towns and cities across France.

In Paris, over a 48-hour period beginning on 2 September 1792, as the Legislative Assembly (successor to the National Constituent Assembly) dissolved into chaos, three Church bishops and more than 200 priests were massacred by angry mobs; this constituted part of what would become known as the September Massacres. Priests were among those drowned in mass executions (noyades) for treason under the direction of Jean-Baptiste Carrier; priests and nuns were among the mass executions at Lyons for separatism, on the orders of Joseph Fouché and Collot d'Herbois. Hundreds more priests were imprisoned and made to suffer in abominable conditions in the port of Rochefort.

=== Insurrection of 31 May – 2 June 1793 ===
After the insurrection of 31 May – 2 June 1793, there was a decisive turn away from the revolution's original principles of religious freedom, and in the late summer of 1793 dechristianization evolved into what Jonathan Israel describes as a "repressive, vandalistic, inquisitorial movement". A major spasm of dechristianization broke out during the autumn with many of the acts of dechristianization in 1793 being motivated by the seizure of Church gold and silver to finance the war effort. In November the département council of Indre-et-Loire abolished the word dimanche (English: Sunday). The Gregorian calendar, an instrument decreed by Pope Gregory XIII in 1582, was replaced by the French Republican calendar which abolished the sabbath, saints' days and any references to the Church. The seven-day week became ten days instead. It soon became clear, however, that nine consecutive days of work were too much, and that international relations could not be carried out without reverting to the Gregorian system, which was still in use everywhere outside of France. Consequently, the Gregorian calendar was reimplemented in 1795.

Anti-clerical parades were held, and the Archbishop of Paris, Jean-Baptiste-Joseph Gobel, was forced to resign his duties and made to replace his mitre with the red "Cap of Liberty". Street and place names with any sort of religious connotation were changed, such as the town of Saint-Tropez, which became Héraclée. Religious holidays were banned and replaced with holidays to celebrate the harvest and other non-religious symbols. Many churches were converted into "temples of reason", in which deistic services were held. Local people often resisted this dechristianisation and forced members of the clergy who had resigned to conduct mass again. Maximilien Robespierre and the Committee of Public Safety denounced the dechristianizers as foreign enemies of the revolution and established their own religion. This Cult of the Supreme Being, without the alleged "superstitions" of Catholicism, supplanted both Catholicism and the rival Cult of Reason. Both new religions were short-lived. Just six weeks before his arrest, on 8 June 1794, the still-powerful Robespierre personally led a vast procession through Paris to the Tuileries garden in a ceremony to inaugurate the new faith. His execution occurred shortly afterward, on 28 July 1794.

=== Concordat of 1801 ===
By early 1795, a return to some form of religion-based faith was beginning to take shape, and a law passed on 21 February 1795 legalized public worship, albeit with strict limitations. The ringing of church bells, religious processions and displays of the Christian cross were still forbidden. As late as 1799, priests were still being imprisoned or deported to penal colonies. Persecution only worsened after the French army led by General Louis Alexandre Berthier captured Rome in early 1798, declared a new Roman Republic, and also imprisoned Pope Pius VI, who died in captivity. However, after Napoleon seized control of the government in late 1799, France entered into year-long negotiations with Pope Pius VII, resulting in the Concordat of 1801. This formally ended the dechristianization period and established the rules for a relationship between the Catholic Church and the French state.

Victims of the Reign of Terror totaled somewhere between 20,000 and 40,000. According to one estimate, among those condemned by the revolutionary tribunals about 8 percent were aristocrats, 6 percent clergy, 14 percent middle class, and 70 percent were workers or peasants accused of hoarding, evading the draft, desertion, rebellion, and other purported crimes. Of these social groupings, the clergy of the Catholic Church suffered proportionately the greatest loss.

Anti-Church laws were passed by the Legislative Assembly and its successor, the National Convention, as well as by département councils throughout the country. The Concordat of 1801 endured for more than a century until it was abrogated by the government of the Third Republic, which established a policy of laïcité on 11 December 1905.

== Toll on the Church ==
Under threat of death, imprisonment, military conscription, and loss of income, about 20,000 constitutional priests were forced to abdicate and hand over their letters of ordination, and 6,000 to 9,000 of them agreed or were coerced to marry. Many abandoned their pastoral duties altogether. Nonetheless, some of those who had abdicated continued covertly to minister to the people.

By the end of the decade, approximately 30,000 priests had been forced to leave France, and several hundred who did not leave were executed. Most French parishes were left without the services of a priest and deprived of the sacraments. Any non-juring priest faced the guillotine or deportation to French Guiana. By Easter 1794, few of France's 40,000 churches remained open; many had been closed, sold, destroyed, or converted to other uses.

Victims of revolutionary violence, whether religious or not, were popularly treated as Christian martyrs, and the places where they were killed became pilgrimage destinations. Catechising in the home, folk religion, syncretic and heterodox practices all became more common. The long-term effects on religious practice in France were significant. Many who were dissuaded from their traditional religious practices never resumed them.

== Gallery ==
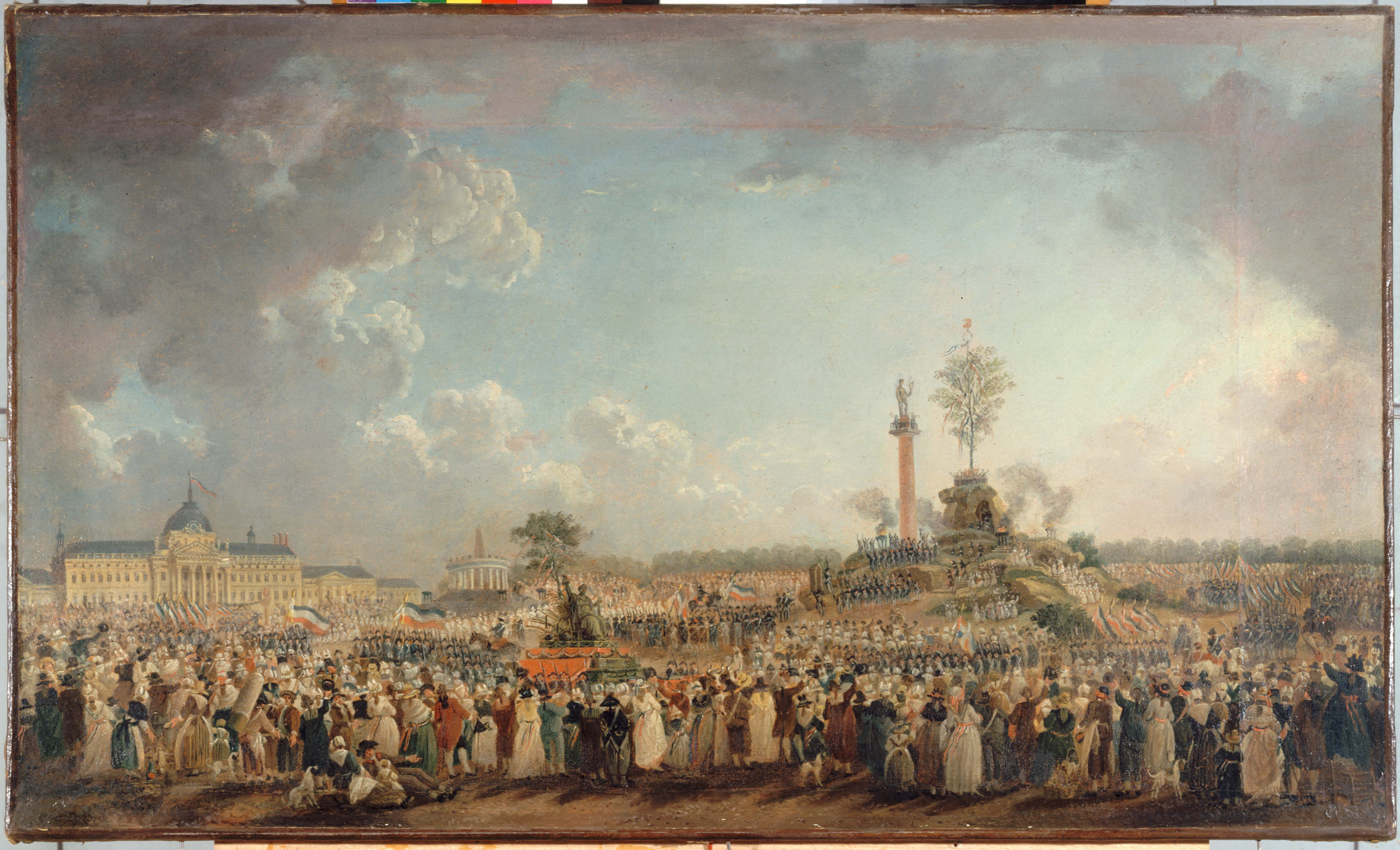
Festival of the Supreme Being, 8 June 1794

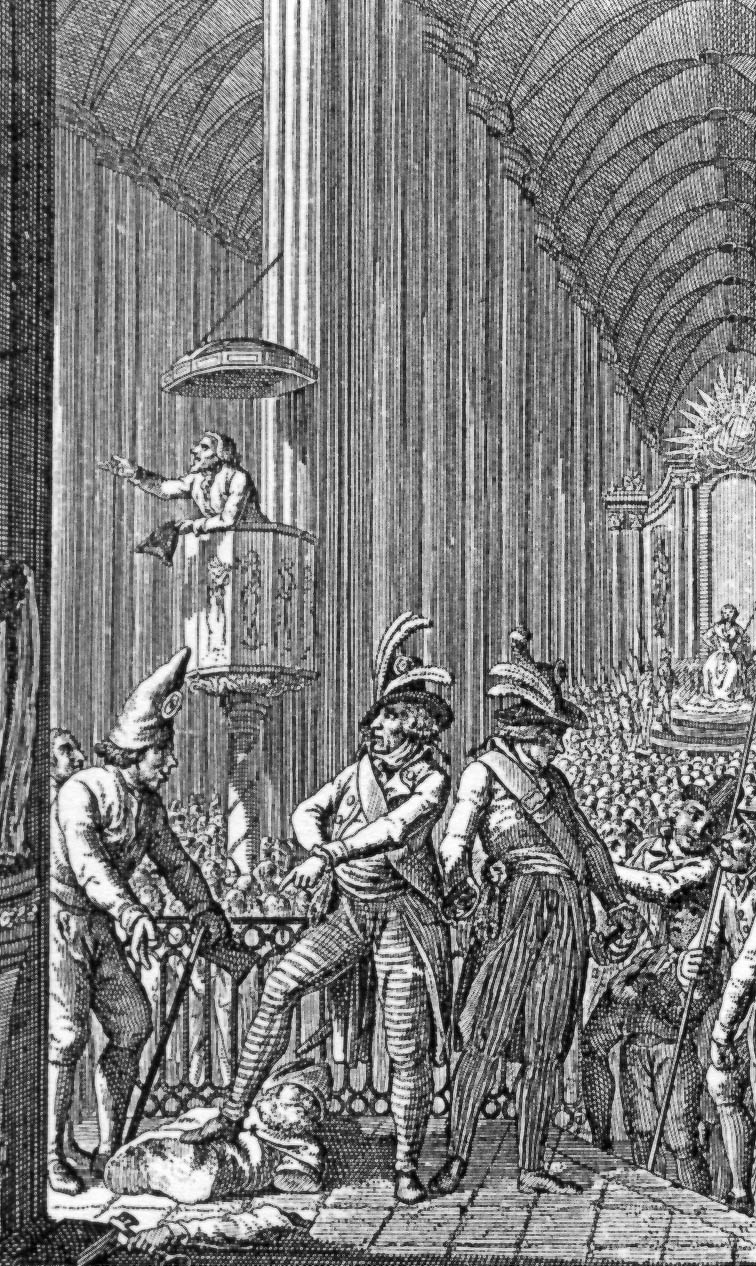
Notre Dame of Strasbourg turned into a Temple of Reason.

== See also ==
- Civil Constitution of the Clergy
- 1905 French law on the Separation of the Churches and the State
- Religion in France
- Christianity in France
- Persecution of Christians
- People engaged in the campaign: Jacques Hébert, Pierre Gaspard Chaumette, Joseph Fouché
