= French First Republic =

Government of France from 1792 to 1804

Coordinates: 48°51′55″N 02°19′38″E

French Republic République française
- 1792–1804
- Top: Flag (1794-1804); Bottom: Flag (1792-1794) Coat of arms of the Republic
- Motto: Liberté, égalité, fraternité ("Liberty, Equality, Fraternity")
- Anthem: "Chant de guerre pour l'Armée du Rhin" ("War Song for the Army of the Rhine")
- The French First Republic in 1799: Directly administered; Sister republics and occupied territories

- Louisiana as part of the French colonial empire from 1800 until 1803
- Capital and largest city: Paris
- Common languages: French (official); Occitan, German, Dutch, Breton, Basque
- Religion: Constitutional Church (until 15 July 1801); Cult of Reason (October 1793 – March 1794); Cult of the Supreme Being (7 May 1794 – 28 July 1794); Decadary Cult (4 August 1798 – 9 November 1799); Catholicism, Calvinism, Lutheranism, and Judaism (15 July 1801 – 18 May 1804)
- Demonym: French
- Government: 1792–1795: Revolutionary republic; 1795–1799: Directorial republic; 1799–1804: Military dictatorship
- Governments
  - 1792: National Convention
  - 1792–1795: Committee of Public Safety
  - 1795–1799: Directory
  - 1799–1804: Consulate; Napoleon Bonaparte as First Consul
- Legislature: National Convention (1792–1795); Council of Ancients and Council of Five Hundred (1795–1799); Sénat conservateur and Corps législatif (1799–1804)
- Historical era: French Revolutionary Wars; Napoleonic Wars
  - Abolition of the French monarchy: 21 September 1792
  - Reign of Terror: 10 March 1793 – 27 July 1794
  - Coup of 9–10 Thermidor: 27 July 1794
  - Constitution of the Year III: 6 September 1795
  - Coup of 18 Fructidor: 4 September 1797
  - Coup of 30 Prairial VII: 18 June 1799
  - Coup of 18 Brumaire: 9 November 1799
  - Constitution of the Year VIII: 24 December 1799
  - French Revolutionary Wars end: 27 March 1802
  - Napoleonic Wars begin: 18 May 1803
  - Napoleon proclaimed emperor: 18 May 1804

Area
- 1800 (including colonies): 3,000,000 km^{2} (1,200,000 sq mi)

Population
  - 1800 (not including colonies): 29 million
- Currency: livre (to 1794), franc, assignat
Preceded by
Kingdom of France
Holy Roman Empire
Comtat Venaissin
Monaco
Succeeded by
First French Empire

In the history of France, the French Republic (French: République française), retroactively referred to as the First Republic (French: Première République) and sometimes referred to in historiography as Revolutionary France, was founded on 21 September 1792 during the French Revolution. The First Republic lasted until the declaration of the First Empire on 18 May 1804 under Napoléon Bonaparte, although the form of government changed several times.

On 21 September 1792, the deputies of the Convention, gathered for the first time, unanimously decided the abolition of the constitutional monarchy in France.

Although the Republic was never officially proclaimed on 22 September 1792, the decision was made to date the acts from the year I of the Republic. On 25 September 1792, the Republic was declared "one and indivisible". From 1792 to 1802, France was at war with the rest of Europe. It also experienced internal conflicts, including the wars in Vendée.

This period was characterised by the downfall and abolition of the French monarchy, the establishment of the National Convention and the Reign of Terror, the Thermidorian Reaction and the founding of the Directory, and, finally, the creation of the Consulate and Napoleon's rise to power.

== End of the monarchy in France ==
Under the Legislative Assembly, which was in power before the proclamation of the First Republic, France was engaged in war with Prussia and Austria. In July 1792, Charles William Ferdinand, Duke of Brunswick, commanding general of the Austro–Prussian Army, issued his Brunswick Manifesto, threatening the destruction of Paris should any harm come to King Louis XVI and his family.

This foreign threat exacerbated France's political turmoil amid the French Revolution and deepened the passion and sense of urgency among the various factions. In the insurrection of 10 August 1792, citizens stormed the Tuileries Palace, killing six hundred of the King's Swiss guards and insisting on the removal of the king.

A renewed fear of counterrevolutionary action prompted further violence, and in the first week of September 1792, mobs of Parisians broke into the city's prisons. They killed over half of the prisoners, including nobles, clergymen, and political prisoners, but also common criminals, such as prostitutes and petty thieves. Many victims were murdered in their cells: raped, stabbed, and/or slashed to death. This became known as the September Massacres.

== National Convention (1792–1795) ==
Initial armorial used by the Republic until 1794

As a result of the spike in public violence and the political instability of the constitutional monarchy, a party of six members of France's Legislative Assembly was assigned the task of overseeing elections. The resulting Convention was founded with the dual purpose of abolishing the monarchy and drafting a new constitution.

The convention's first act was to establish the French First Republic and officially strip the king of all political powers. Louis XVI, by then a private citizen bearing his family name of Capet, was subsequently put on trial for crimes of high treason starting in December 1792. On 16 January 1793 he was convicted, and on 21 January, he was executed.

Throughout the winter of 1792 and spring of 1793, Paris was plagued by food riots and mass hunger. The new Convention did little to remedy the problem until late spring of 1793, occupied instead with matters of war. Finally, on 6 April 1793, the Convention created the Committee of Public Safety, and was given a monumental task: "To deal with the radical movements of the Enragés, food shortages and riots, the revolt in the Vendée and in Brittany, recent defeats of its armies, and the desertion of its commanding general."

Most notably, the Committee of Public Safety instated a policy of terror, and perceived enemies of the republic began to be executed by guillotine at an ever-increasing rate. This began a period which is known today as the Reign of Terror.

Despite growing discontent with the National Convention as a ruling body, in June the Convention drafted the Constitution of 1793, which was ratified by popular vote in early August. However, the Committee of Public Safety was seen as an "emergency" government, and the rights guaranteed by the 1789 Declaration of the Rights of Man and of the Citizen and the new constitution were suspended under its control.

The constitution of the republic did not provide for a formal head of state or a head of government. It could be discussed whether the head of state would have been the president of the National Convention under international law. However, this changed every two weeks and was therefore not formative.

== Directory (1795–1799) ==
After the arrest and execution of Robespierre on 28 July 1794, the Jacobin club was closed, and the surviving Girondins were reinstated. A year later, the National Convention adopted the Constitution of the Year III. They reestablished freedom of worship, began releasing large numbers of prisoners, and most importantly, initiated elections for a new legislative body.

On 3 November 1795, the Directory was established. Under this system, France was led by a bicameral Parliament, consisting of an upper chamber called the Council of Elders (with 250 members) and a lower chamber called the Council of Five Hundred (with, accordingly, 500 members), and a collective Executive of five members called the Directory (from which the historical period gets its name). Due to internal instability, caused by hyperinflation of the paper monies ("Assignats"), and French military disasters in 1798 and 1799, the Directory lasted only four years, until overthrown in 1799.

== Consulate (1799–1804) ==
The French Consulate era began with the coup of 18 Brumaire on 9 November 1799. Members of the Directory itself planned the coup, indicating clearly the failing power of the Directory. Napoleon Bonaparte was a co-conspirator in the coup and became head of the government as the First Consul.

In conjunction with this powerful executive authority, four assemblies were established:

- The Council of State, with members appointed by the First Consul, was the body responsible for preparing draft laws and assisting the head of state in adjudicating administrative disputes, a role formally defined in Article 52 of the Constitution of Year VIII (22 Frimaire, Year VIII) as being tasked with drafting proposed laws and regulations of public administration under the direction of the consuls, as well as resolving administrative difficulties.
- The Tribunate, officially established on 11 Nivôse Year VIII (1 January 1800), comprised one hundred deputies (reduced to fifty after the Constitution of Year X) appointed by the Senate for five-year terms, with one-fifth of its membership subject to renewal annually. The Tribunate assumed some of the functions of the Council of Five Hundred, its role being limited to deliberating on proposed laws before their adoption by the Legislative Body.
- The Legislative Body, established concurrently with the Tribunate, served as the successor to the Council of Ancients. Its membership consisted of three hundred individuals, appointed by the Senate for five-year terms with one-fifth of the body subject to renewal annually. The primary function of the Legislative Body was to vote on proposed laws without the provision for debate or amendment.
- The Conservative Senate, whose primary role is to ensure the preservation of the Constitution, hence its name, and to elect the members of the Legislative Body and the Tribunate, the judges of the Court of Cassation, and the accounting commissioners, comprised sixty irremovable members, at least forty years of age, appointed by Bonaparte, who in turn co-opted twenty additional senators; progressively, the power of this assembly would expand, as it would later be tasked with drafting legislative texts, the sénatus-consultes, established by the Constitution of Year X.

On 18 May 1804, Napoleon was proclaimed Emperor of the French by the Sénat conservateur. He would later proclaim himself Emperor of the French, ending the First French Republic and ushering in the First French Empire.

Leading members of the First Republic (and factions)
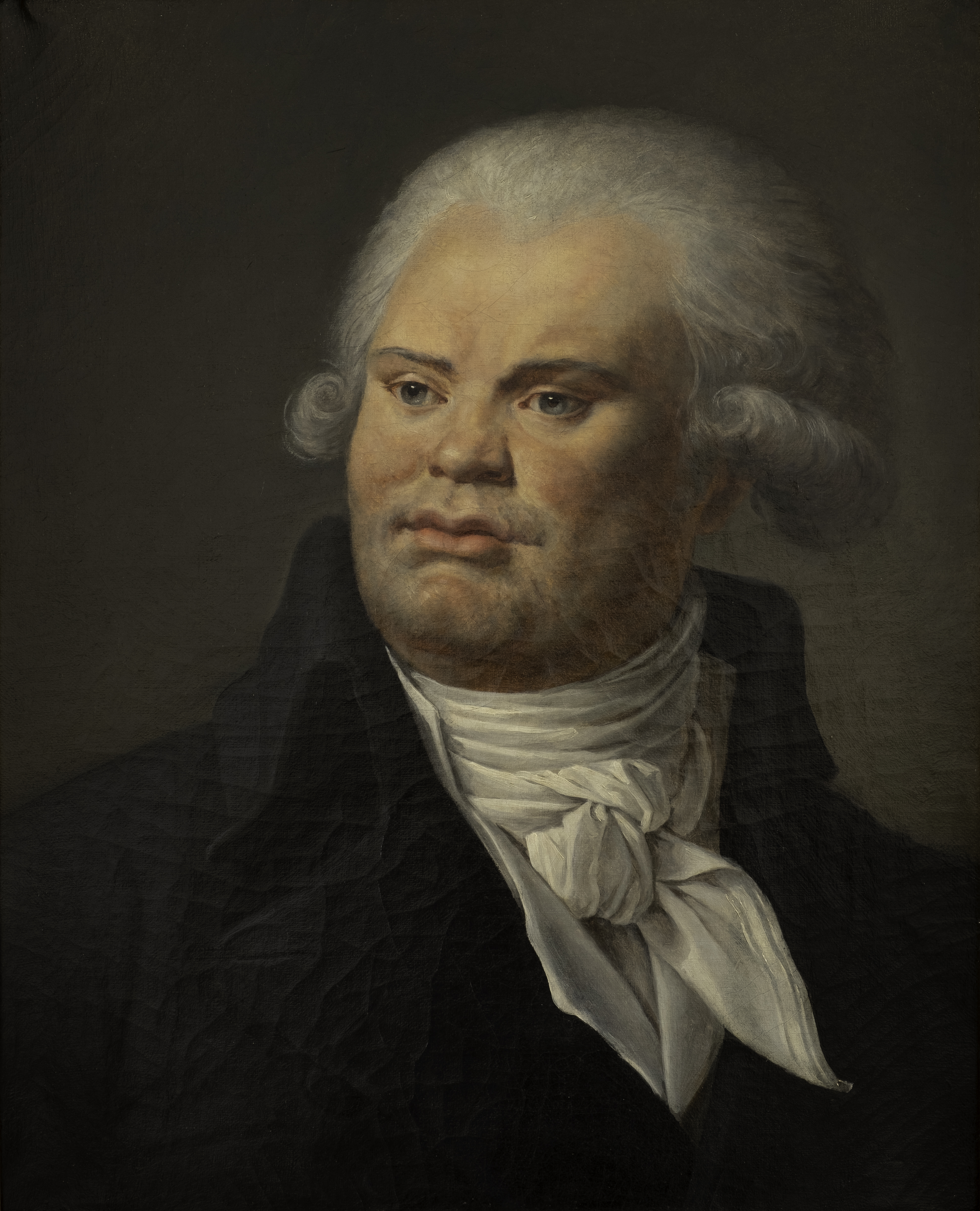
Georges Danton (Cordeliers/The Mountain)

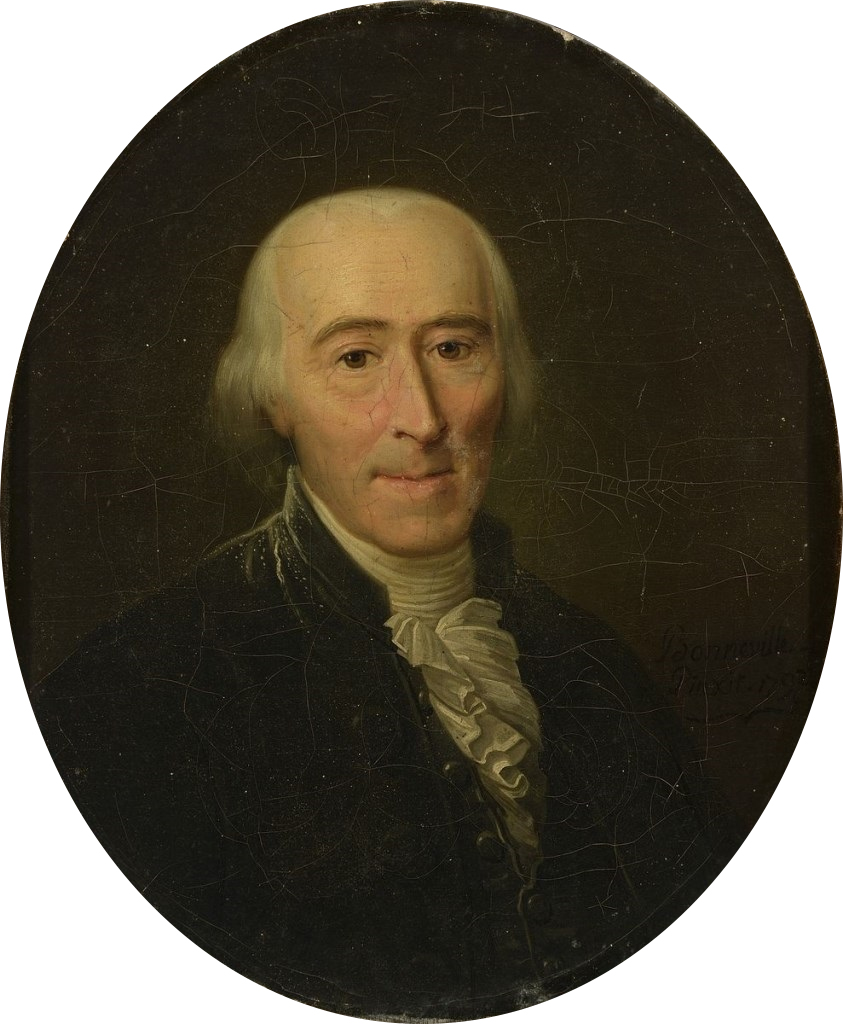
Jean-Marie Roland de la Platière (Girondins)

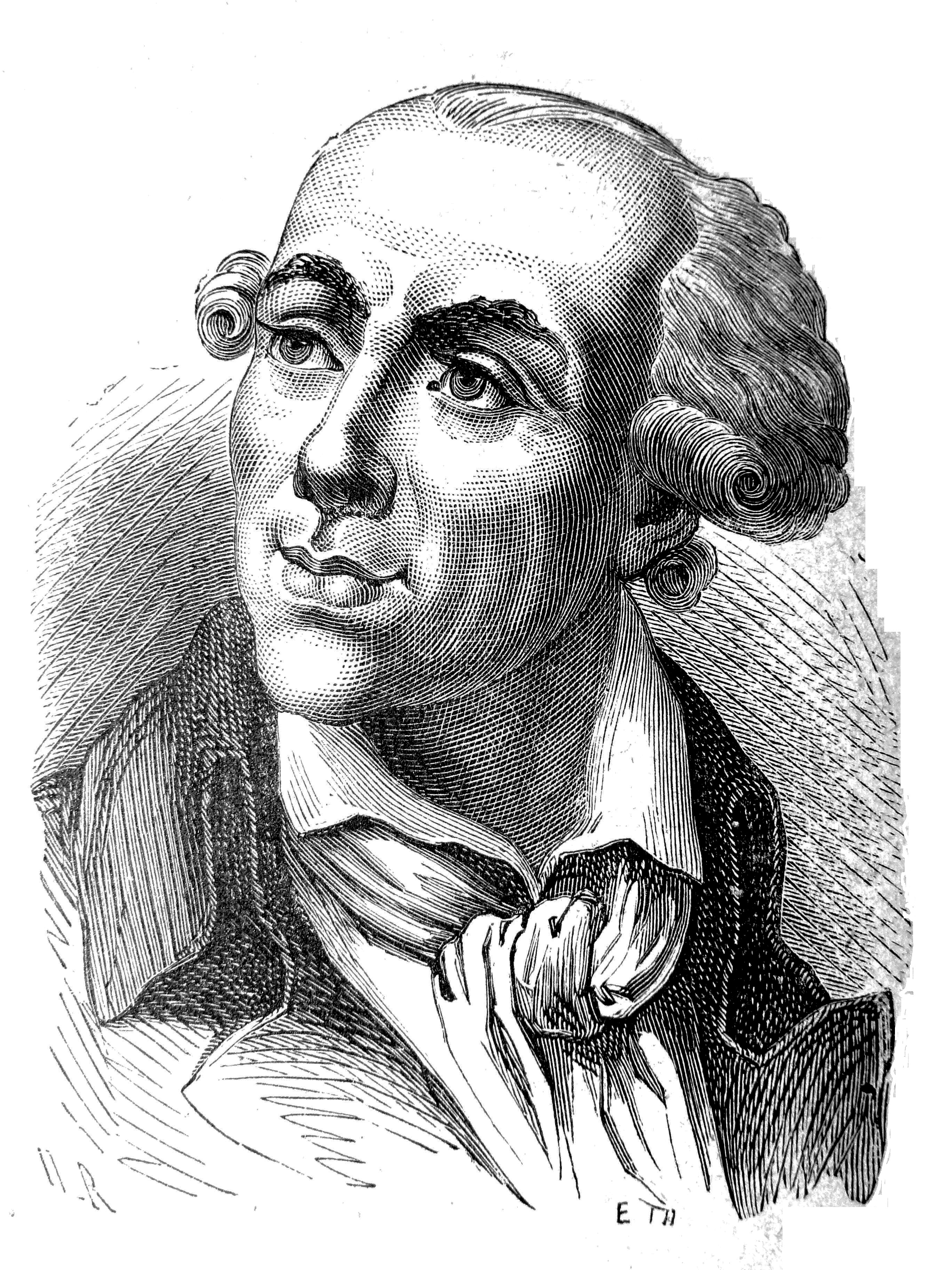
Étienne Clavière (Girondins)

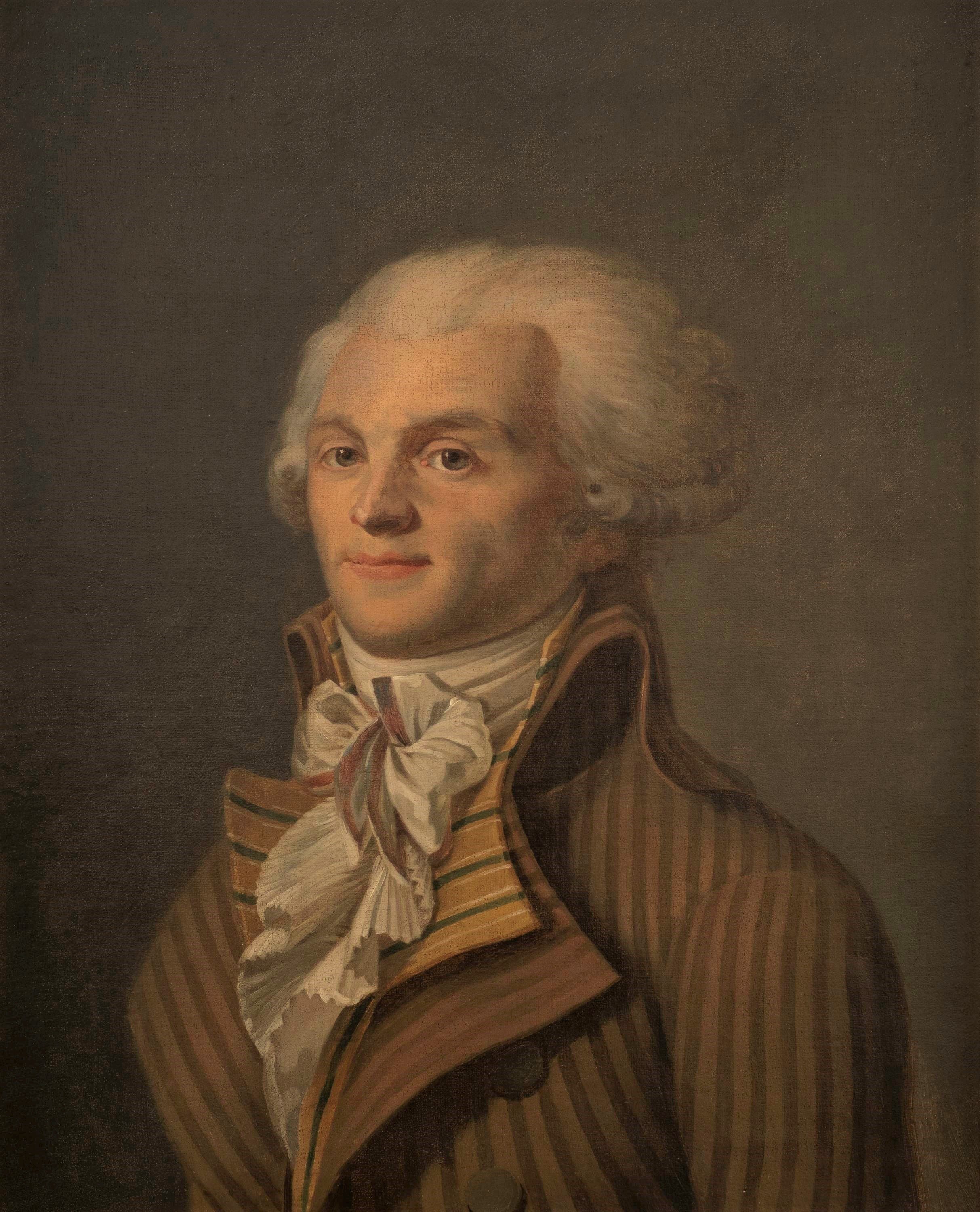
Maximilien Robespierre (Jacobins/The Mountain)

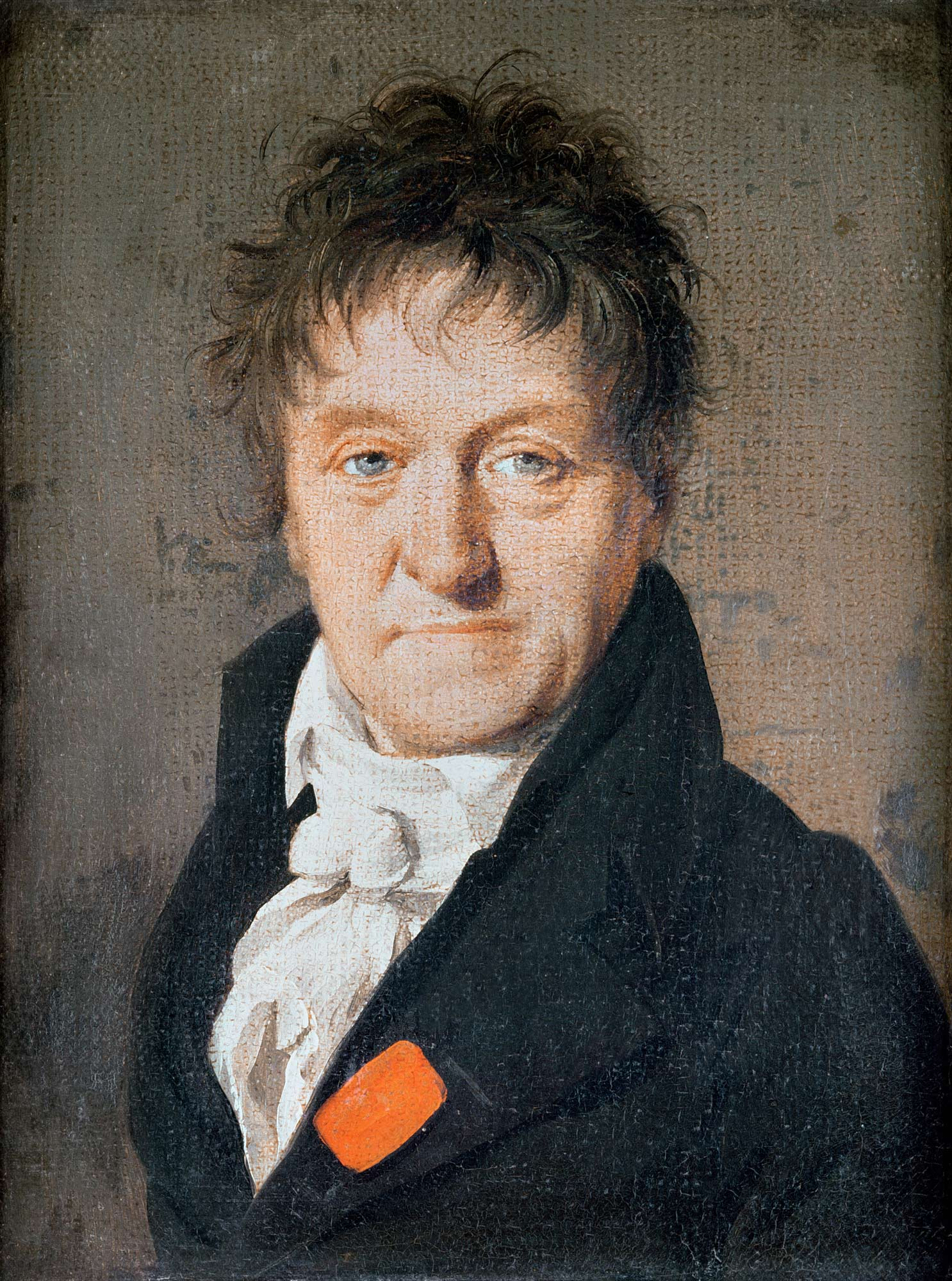
Lazare Carnot (The Plain)

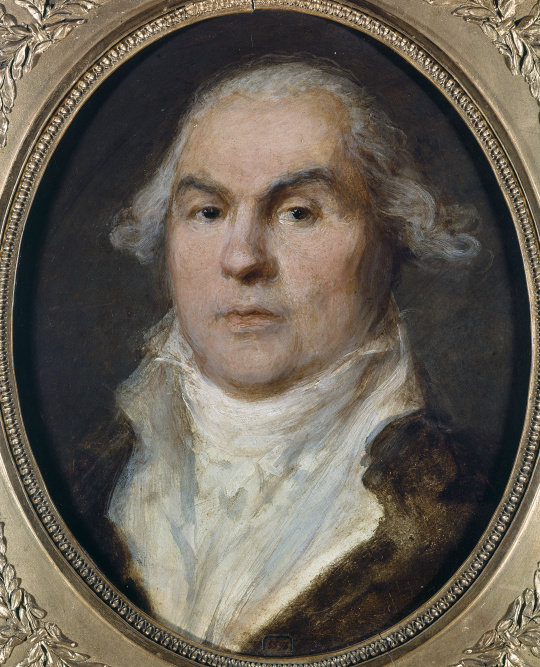
Jean-Jacques-Régis de Cambacérès (The Plain)

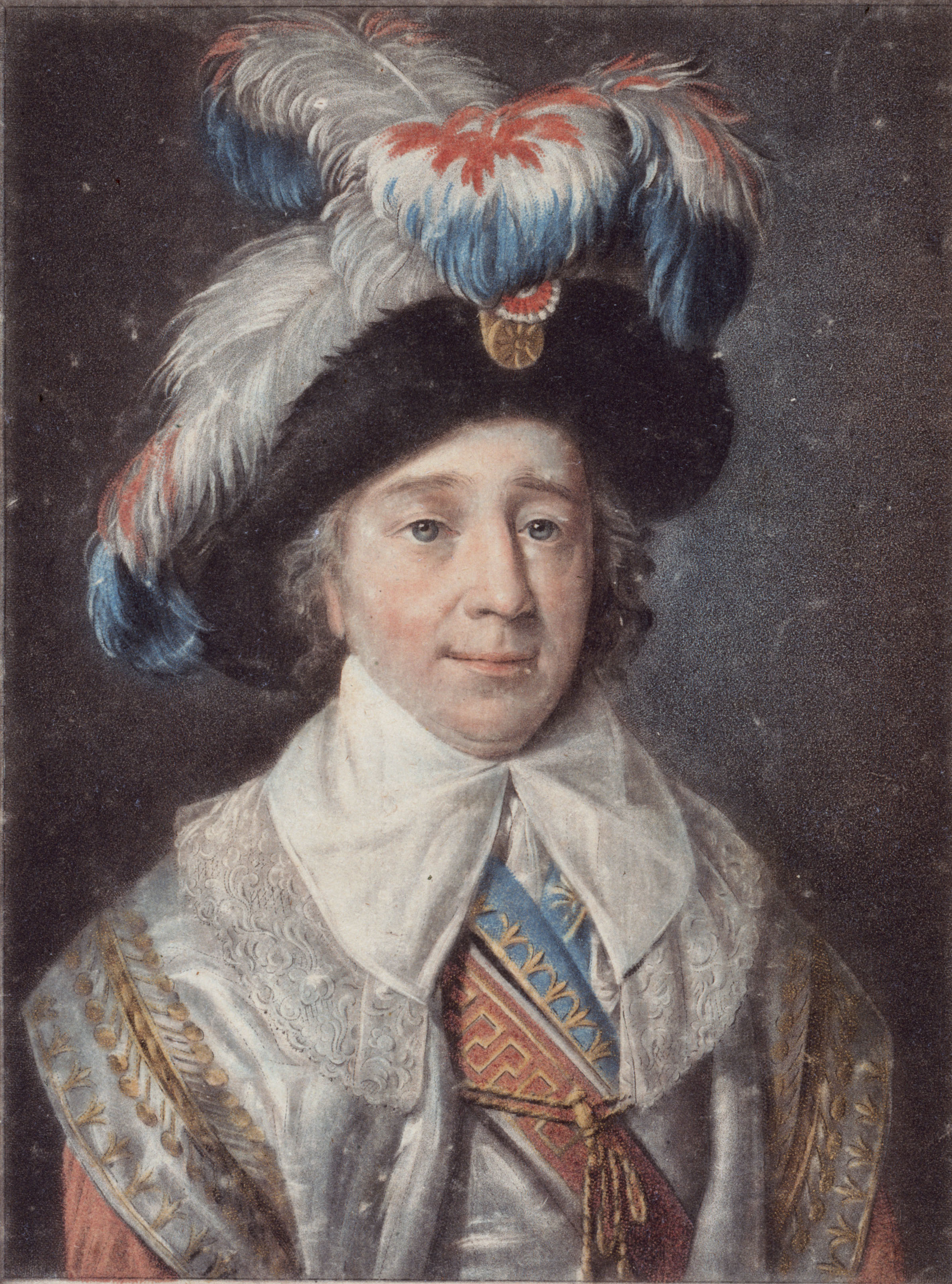
Paul Barras (Thermidorians)

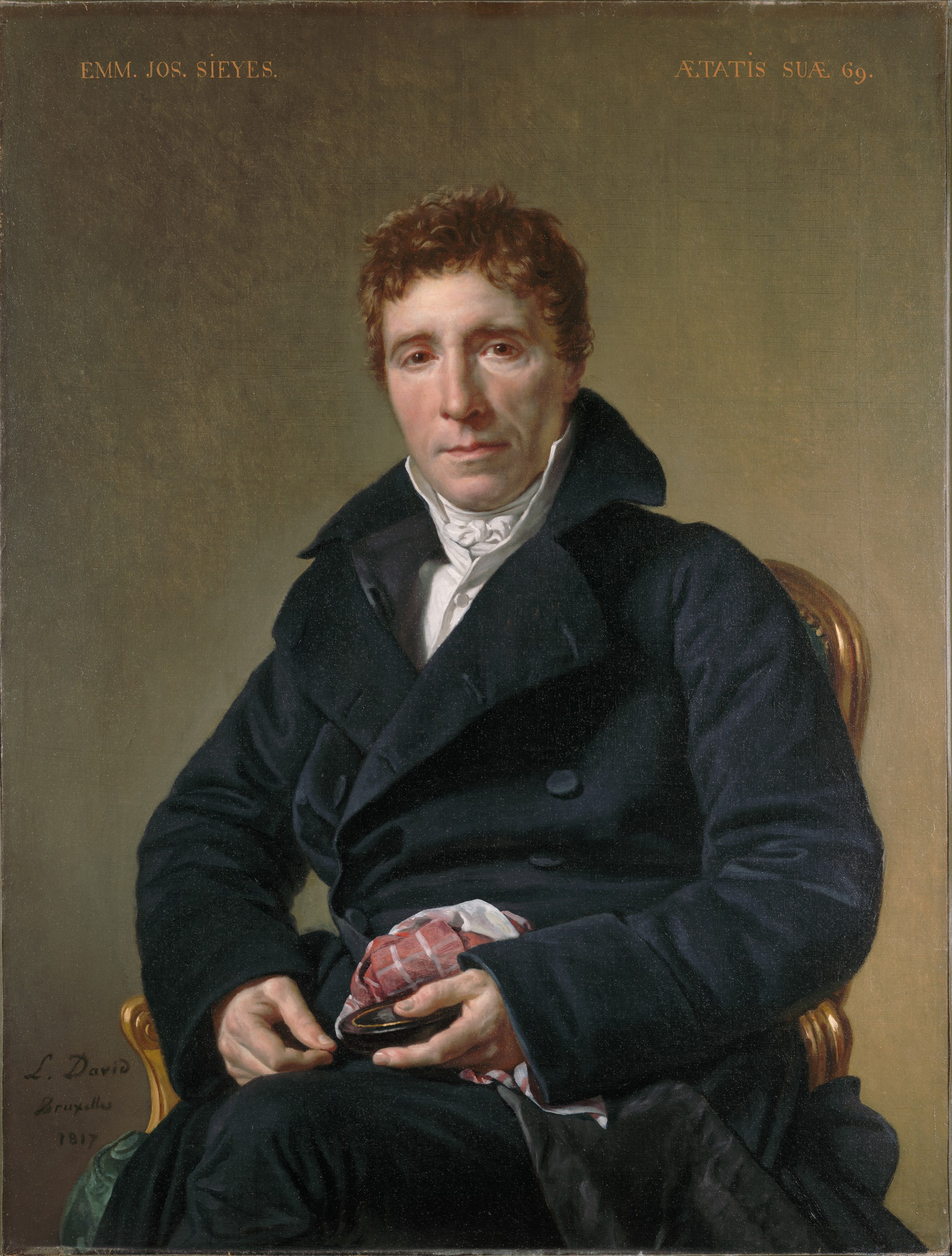
Emmanuel Joseph Sieyès (Independent)

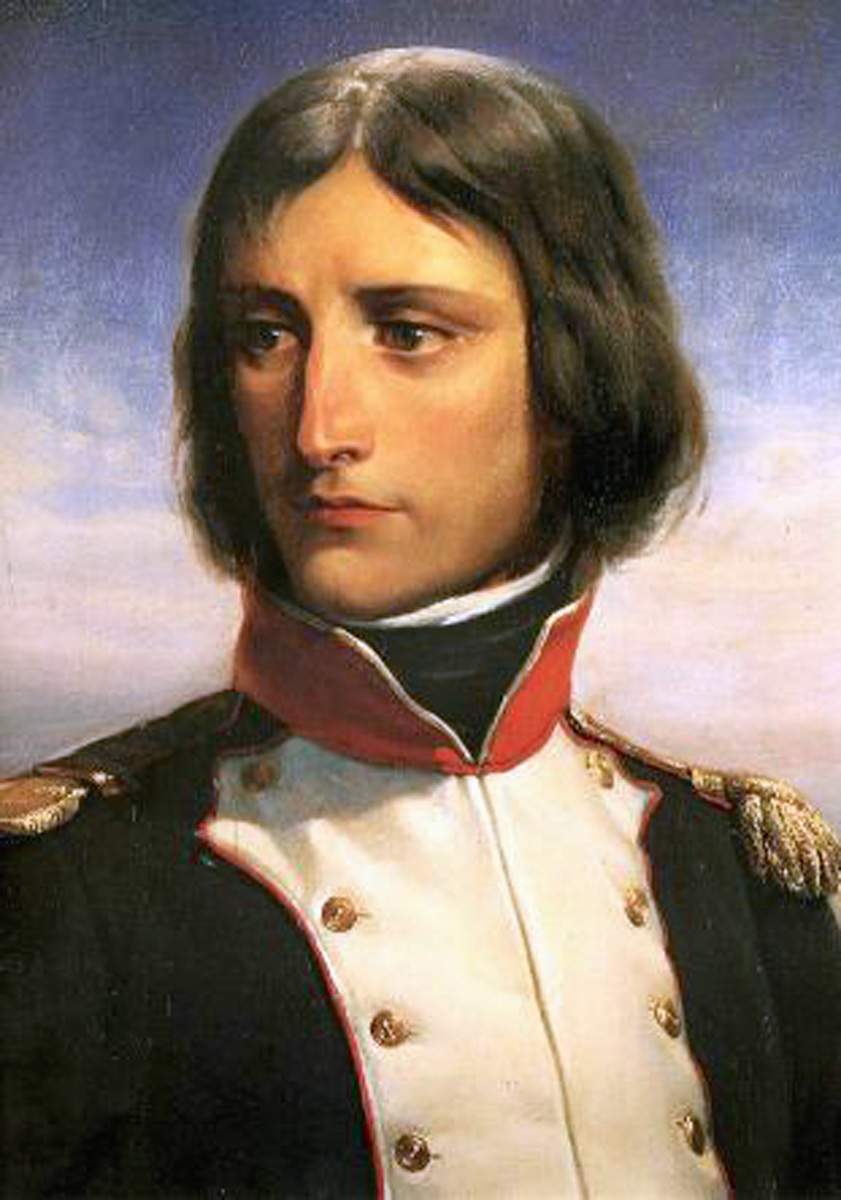
Napoleon Bonaparte (Bonapartist)

== See also ==
- French Republican Calendar
- Savoy's annexation to France (1792)

== Bibliography ==
- Doyle, William (1989). The Oxford History of the French Revolution. Oxford: Oxford University Press. pp. 191–192. ISBN 978-0199252985.
