= Pledge of Allegiance (The Bahamas) =

National pledge of the commonwealth of the Bahamas

The Pledge of Allegiance is the national pledge of The Commonwealth of the Bahamas which was written by Rev. Philip Rahming.

== The Pledge ==
I Pledge my allegiance to the flag and to the Commonwealth of The Bahamas

For which it stands, one people united in love and service.
