= Theophilanthropy =

Deistic sect in Revolutionary France

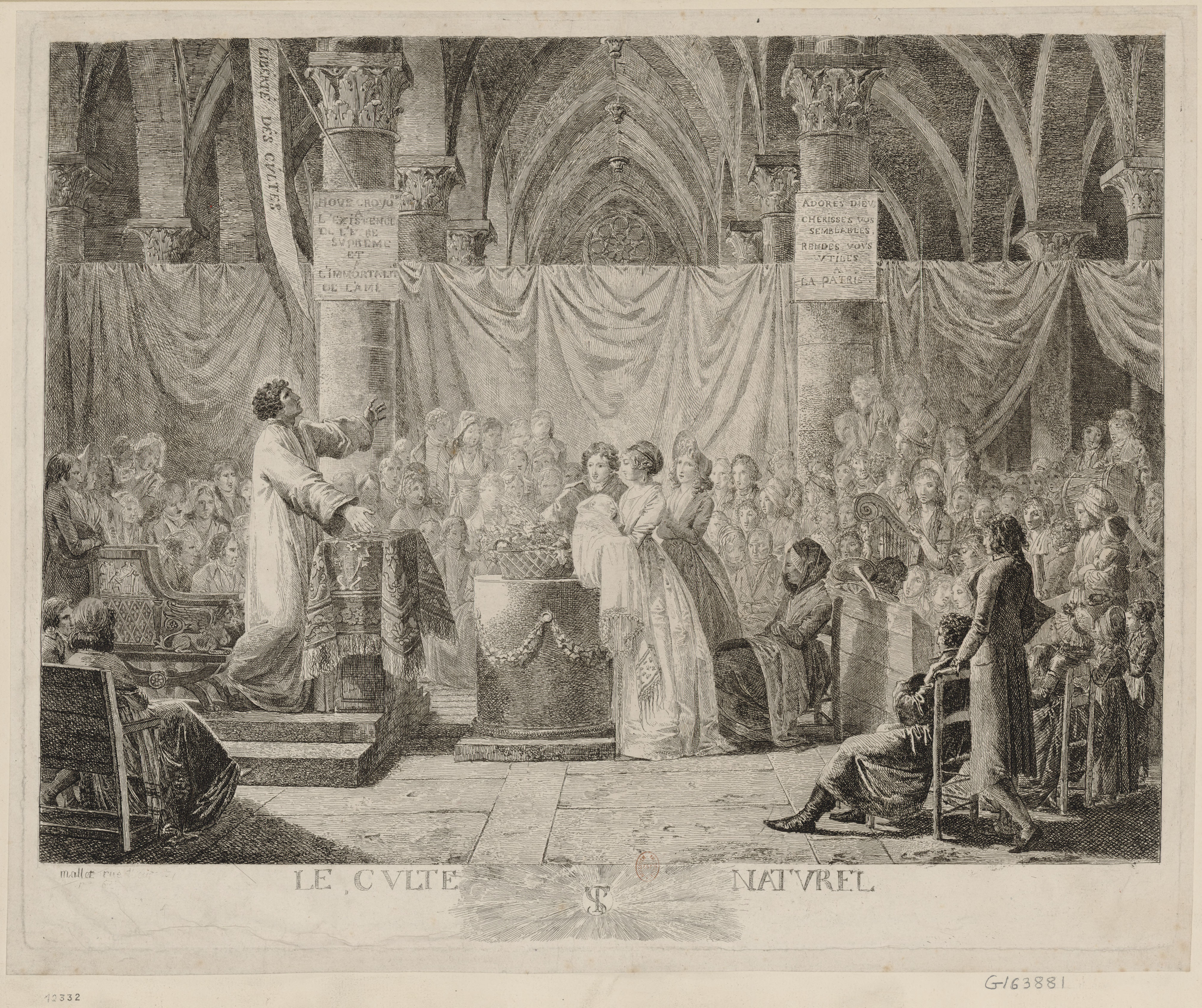
Le culte naturel ('The Natural Cult'), a print depicting the baptism of a child by an assembly of Theophilanthropists. Engraving by Jean-Baptiste Mallet, Paris, 1797.

Theophilanthropy (from Greek θεός Theos, "God"; φίλος phílos, "friend"; and ἄνθρωπος ánthrôpos, "man"; lit. 'Friends of God and Man') was a secular religion established in France during the later stages of the French Revolution. It aimed to provide a state-sponsored alternative to both established Christianity and the atheistic Cult of Reason. Based on deistic beliefs in the existence of God and the immortality of the soul, its core tenets were the love of God and the love of one's fellow man.

The cult emerged from private circles but gained official support from the Directory, particularly from Director Louis Marie de La Révellière-Lépeaux. Between 1797 and 1798, the Directory promoted Theophilanthropy in an effort to weaken the influence of Catholicism and solidify republican values. However, its state support was short-lived, as it was soon overshadowed by the competing Decadary cult and undermined by political purges. Theophilanthropy was officially banned by Napoleon Bonaparte in 1801 and ceased to exist as an organized movement, though its ideas influenced later thinkers.

== Context ==
=== Legal and political situation ===
The legal foundation for religious freedom in revolutionary France was established by a decree on 21 February 1795 and reinforced by Article 354 of the Constitution of the Year III. Despite this official tolerance, laws against refractory clergy (priests who refused to swear allegiance to the state) remained in effect, though they were gradually relaxed until the anti-royalist Coup of 18 Fructidor in September 1797.

The period was marked by a perceived threat from the clergy. The Republic faced the First White Terror, widespread opposition from refractory priests in regions like the Vendée, and lukewarm support from the constitutional clergy. Meanwhile, the French army's victories in Italy had humbled the Papacy under Pope Pius VI, who had condemned the Civil Constitution of the Clergy. The writer Louis-Sébastien Mercier saw this as the triumph of reason over

credulity and all the priestly juggleries.

— de Piles 1801, p. 60

In this climate, many republicans believed the best way to secure the new regime was to reshape society's moral foundations, starting with the family. Theophilanthropy arose as one of several private initiatives for popular moral education, alongside projects by figures like Félix Lepeletier and François-Antoine Daubermesnil. These movements were based on the idea, as summarized by Benoist-Lamothe, that

Religion is the main foundation of morality, [and] morality is the firmest support of the laws.

— Mathiez 1903, p. 57

== Origins and establishment ==
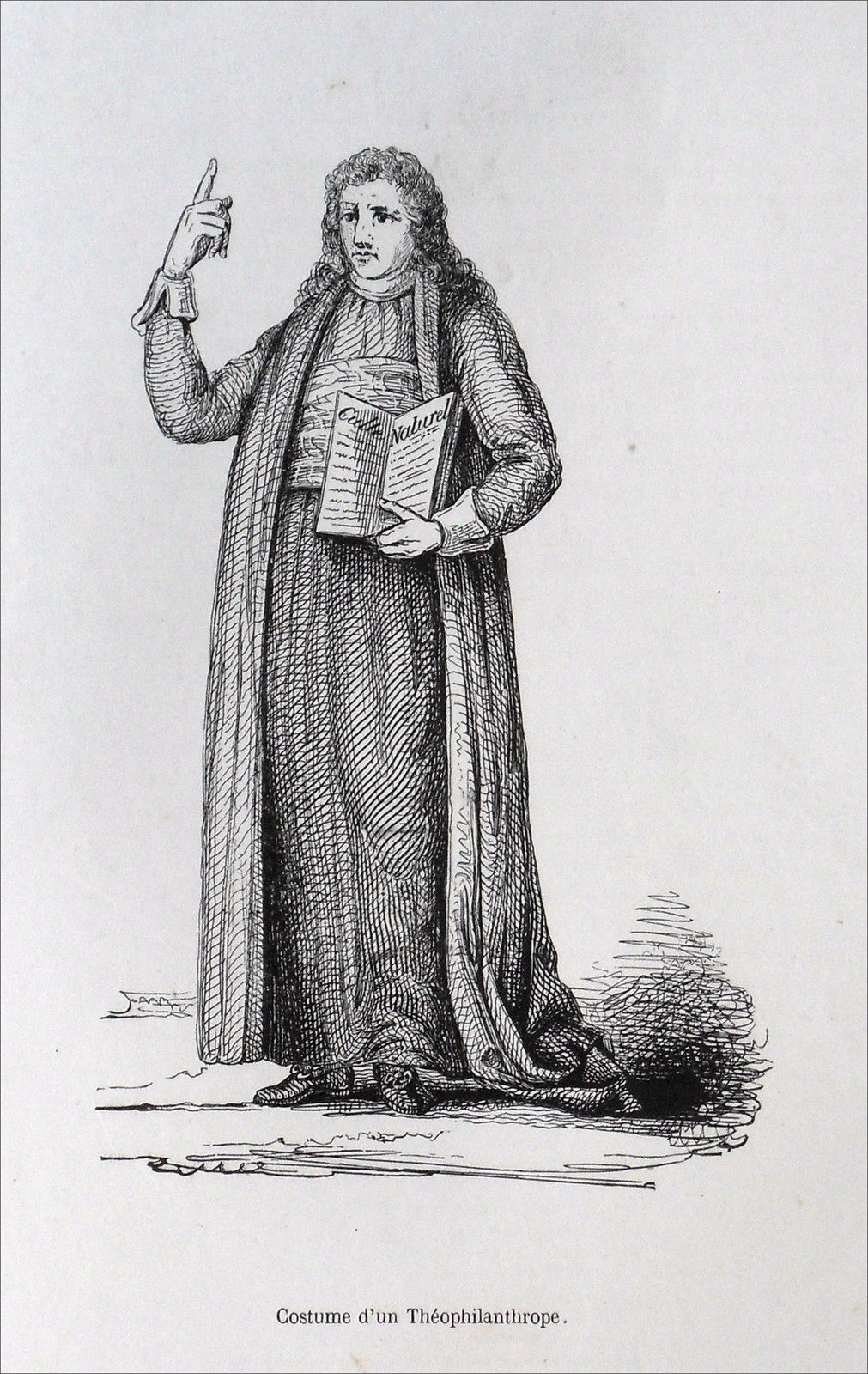
Costume of a Theophilanthropist, 19th-century steel engraving

The founder of Theophilanthropy was Jean-Baptiste Chemin-Dupontès (c. 1760 – c. 1852), a bookseller and former theology student. A moderate supporter of the Revolution, Chemin was associated with Claude Fauchet, a proponent of a national Catholic church. Chemin authored several patriotic and moral pamphlets, including L'Alphabet républicain (The Republican Alphabet), a catechism for the Cult of the Supreme Being.

In September 1796, Chemin published the Manuel des théoanthropophiles (Manual of the Theoanthropophiles), outlining a simple, domestic form of natural religion. The cult became a public movement through the efforts of Valentin Haüy, who organized its first services. Along with three other family men, Chemin and Haüy formed the cult's first steering committee. They renamed the movement "Theophilanthropy" for being more harmonious than "Theoanthropy".

== Principles and practices ==
The core tenets of Theophilanthropy, detailed in the Manuel des théophilanthropes, were a belief in the existence of God and the immortality of the soul. The cult rejected theology and revealed religion in favor of a rationalist and utilitarian morality. As Louis-Sébastien Mercier noted, its moral code emphasized

conjugal love, respect for old age, piety towards parents, and beneficence.

— de Piles 1801, p. 60

Its purpose was to provide the social benefits of religion without the perceived superstitions of Catholicism. In the words of its followers, it

substituted the rudiments of reason...for the terror of hell, the flames of purgatory, [and] the pantomimes of the Mass.

— de Piles 1801, p. 60

Services were held in "temples" (often shared parish churches) decorated simply with moral inscriptions, flowers, and fruits on an altar. Ceremonies included invocations to the "Father of Nature", examinations of conscience, hymns, and moral lectures.

The first public service was held in January 1797 at the Sainte-Catherine church in Paris. The movement quickly gained influential supporters, including the economist Pierre Samuel du Pont de Nemours, the politician Guillaume François Charles Goupil de Préfelne, and the artist Jacques-Louis David.

== Rise and decline ==
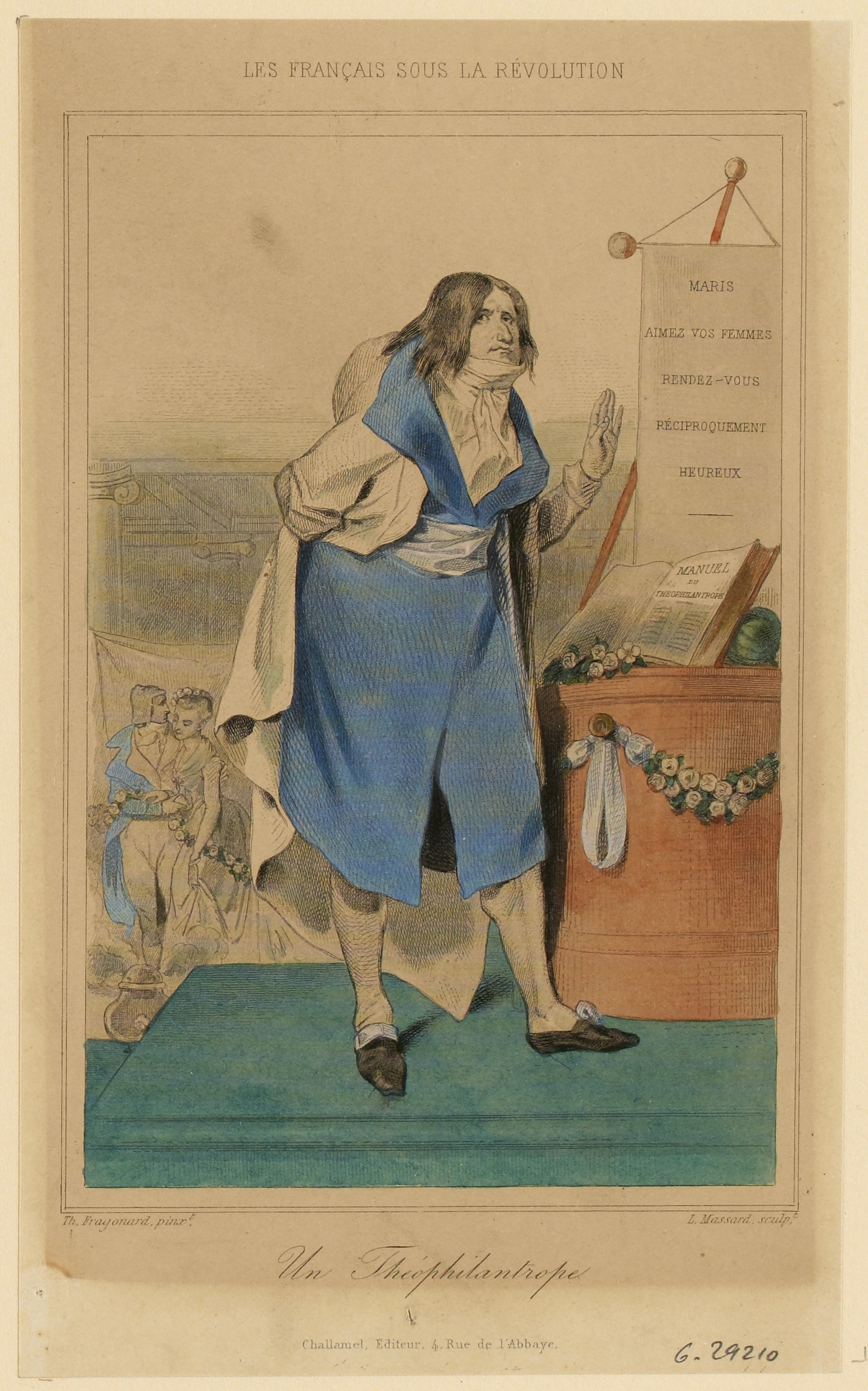
A Theophilanthropist, from Les Français sous la Révolution (1843)

Theophilanthropy received its most significant boost from Louis Marie de La Révellière-Lépeaux, a prominent member of the Directory. Beginning in April 1797, he promoted the cult as a state-sanctioned republican religion to supplant Catholicism. With his support, the movement gained adherents such as Bernardin de Saint-Pierre and Thomas Paine. The group opened schools and was granted permission to use nineteen churches in Paris, often sharing the premises with constitutional and refractory Catholic congregations.

The movement took on an increasingly anti-Catholic tone and spread to the provinces. However, its official backing began to wane with the rise of the Decadary cult, a rival civic religion promoted by Director Philippe-Antoine Merlin de Douai and Minister of the Interior Nicolas-Louis François de Neufchâteau.

Theophilanthropy drew ridicule from its opponents, who nicknamed its followers Les Filous en troupe (The Troop of Swindlers). A famous anecdote recounts that after La Révellière-Lépeaux presented his new religion, Talleyrand quipped:

I have only one observation to make. To found his religion, Jesus Christ was crucified and resurrected. You should have tried to do as much.

Following Napoleon Bonaparte's rise to power and his policy of reconciliation with the Catholic Church through the Concordat of 1801, Theophilanthropy lost all official favor. A decree on 4 October 1801 banned the cult from using national buildings (churches), and in March 1803, all its practices were prohibited.

== Legacy ==
After the ban, Jean-Baptiste Chemin returned to Freemasonry. Some Theophilanthropic ideas persisted in small circles, particularly in the Yonne and Loiret departments.

The movement later inspired the Greek philosopher Theophilos Kairis, who founded "Theosebism" based on its principles and was subsequently anathematized by the Eastern Orthodox Church in 1839. In 1882, an attempt to revive the cult was made by Joseph Décembre (known as Décembre-Alonnier), who founded the Comité central théophilanthropique in a strongly anticlerical spirit, aiming to market its ideas to Freemasons and occultists.

== See also ==
- Cult of Reason
- Cult of the Supreme Being
- Decadary Cult
- Deism
- Dechristianization of France during the French Revolution
