= Cult of the Supreme Being =

1794 deistic state religion during the French Revolution

- Culte de l'Être suprême
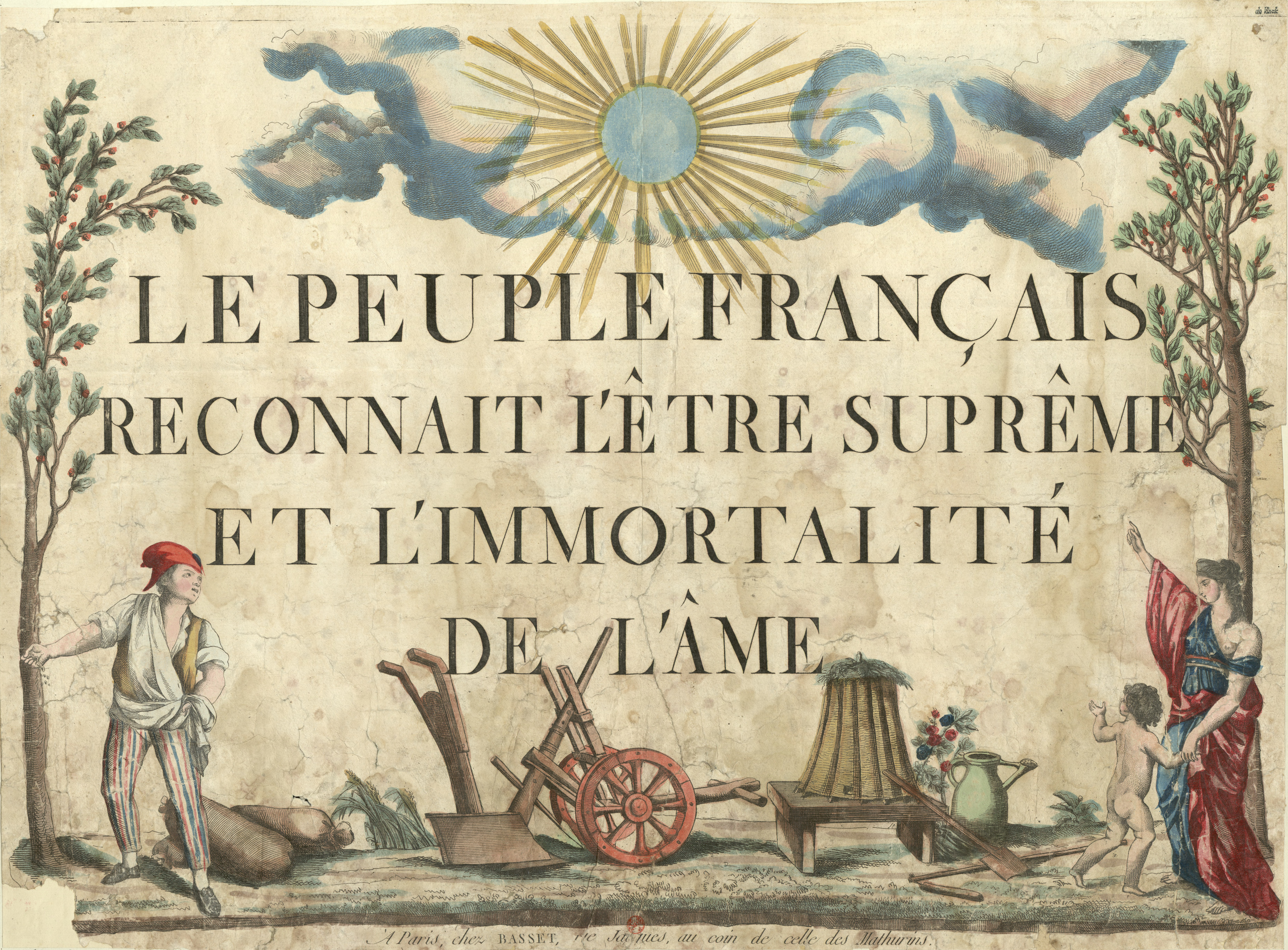
- "The French people recognize the Supreme Being and the immortality of the soul" (1794 print)
- Classification: Deism
- Region: France
- Language: French
- Founder: Maximilien Robespierre
- Origin: 7 May 1794; 232 years ago
- Defunct: 28 July 1794; 232 years ago

The Cult of the Supreme Being (French: Culte de l'Être suprême) (Note: The word "cult" in French (culte) means "a form of worship", without any of its negative or exclusivist implications in English: Robespierre intended it to appeal to a universal congregation.) was a Deistic religion established by Maximilien Robespierre during the French Revolution as the intended state religion of France and a replacement for its rival, the atheistic Cult of Reason, and of Roman Catholicism. It went unsupported after the fall of Robespierre and, along with the Cult of Reason, was officially banned by First Consul Napoleon Bonaparte in 1802.

== Origins ==
The French Revolution had caused many radical changes in France, but one of the most fundamental for the hitherto Catholic nation was the official rejection of religion. The first new major organized school of thought emerged under the umbrella name of the Cult of Reason. Advocated by radicals like Jacques Hébert and Antoine-François Momoro, the Cult of Reason distilled a mixture of largely atheistic views into an anthropocentric philosophy. No gods at all were worshipped in the Cult of Reason; the guiding principle was devotion to the abstract concept of Reason.

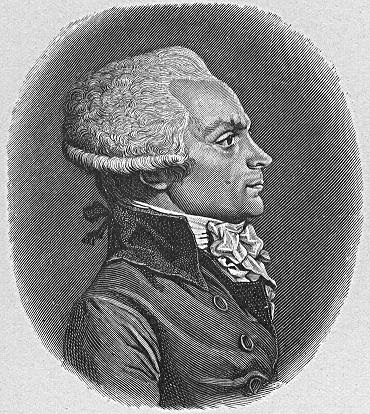
Maximilien Robespierre (1758–1794)

This rejection of all godhead appalled Maximilien Robespierre. Though he was no admirer of Catholicism, he had a special dislike for atheism. He thought that belief in a supreme being was important for social order, and he liked to quote Voltaire: "If God did not exist, it would be necessary to invent him". To him, the Cult of Reason's philosophical offenses were compounded by the "scandalous scenes" and "wild masquerades" attributed to its practice. In late 1793, Robespierre delivered a fiery denunciation of the Cult of Reason and of its proponents and proceeded to give his own vision of proper Revolutionary religion. Devised almost entirely by Robespierre, the Cult of the Supreme Being was authorized by the National Convention on 7 May 1794 as the civic religion of France.

== Religious tenets ==
Robespierre believed that reason is only a means to an end, and the singular end is virtue. He sought to move beyond simple deism (often described as Voltairean by its adherents) to a new and, in his view, more rational devotion to the godhead. The primary principles of the Cult of the Supreme Being were a belief in the existence of a god and the immortality of the human soul. These beliefs were put to the service of Robespierre's fuller meaning, which was of a type of civic-minded, public virtue he attributed to the Greeks and Romans. This type of virtue could be attained only through active fidelity to liberty and democracy. Belief in a living god and a higher moral code, he said, were "constant reminders of justice" and thus essential to a republican society.

On 7 May 1794, the National Convention established the Worship of the Supreme Being; the opening clauses of the Decree Establishing the Worship of the Supreme Being of the 18th Floréal of the Year II declared:

- The French People recognize the existence of the Supreme Being and the Immortality of the Soul.
- They declare that the best service of the Supreme Being is the practice of man's duties.
- They set among the most important of these duties the detestation of bad faith and tyranny, by punishing tyrants and traitors, by caring for the unfortunate, respecting the weak, defending the oppressed, doing unto others all the good one can, and not being unjust towards anyone.

He dedicated festivals to the Supreme Being, to Truth, Justice, Modesty, Friendship, Frugality, Fidelity, Immortality, Misfortune, etc. The Cult of the Supreme Being was based on the creed of the Savoy chaplain that Jean-Jacques Rousseau had outlined in Book IV of Emile.

== Revolutionary impact ==
Robespierre used the religious issue to publicly denounce the motives of many radicals not in his camp, and it led, directly or indirectly, to the executions of Revolutionary de-Christianisers like Hébert, Momoro, and Anacharsis Cloots. The establishment of the Cult of the Supreme Being represented the beginning of the reversal of the wholesale de-Christianization process that had been looked upon previously with official favour. Simultaneously it marked the apogee of Robespierre's power. Though in theory he was just an equal member of the Committee of Public Safety, Robespierre at this point possessed an unrivalled national prominence.

== Festival of the Supreme Being ==
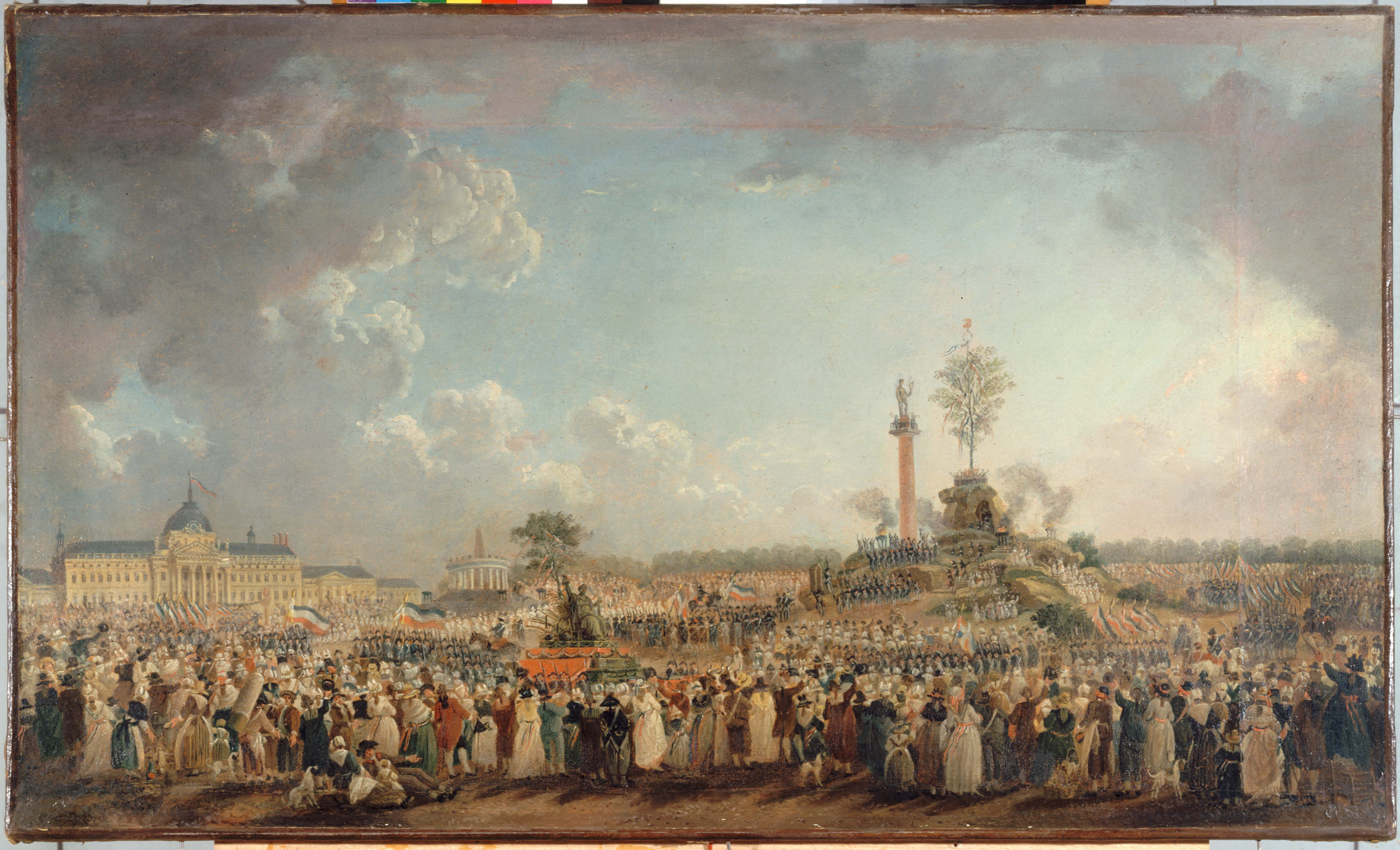
The Festival of the Supreme Being, by Pierre-Antoine Demachy (1794)

To inaugurate the new state religion, Robespierre declared that 20 Prairial Year II (8 June 1794, also the Christian holiday of Pentecost) would be the first day of national celebration of the Supreme Being, and that future republican holidays were to be held on décadi ("tenth days")—the days of rest in the new French Republican Calendar. Every locality was mandated to hold a commemorative event, but the event in Paris was designed on a massive scale. The festival was organized by the artist Jacques-Louis David and François Joseph Talma, and took place around a man-made mountain on the Champ de Mars. Robespierre assumed full leadership of the event, forcefully—and, to many, ostentatiously—declaring the truth and "social utility" of his new religion. While earlier Revolutionary festivals were more spontaneous, the Festival of the Supreme Being was meticulously planned. Historian Mona Ozouf has noted how the "creaking stiffness" of the event has been seen by some to foreshadow "the sclerosis of the Revolution."

Witnesses state that throughout the "Festival of the Supreme Being", Robespierre beamed with joy. He was able to speak of the things about which he was passionate, including virtue, nature, deist beliefs, and his disagreements with atheism. The procession ended on the Champ de Mars. The Convention climbed to the summit of the artificial mountain, where a liberty tree had been planted. (Note: Choirs sang hymns composed by Étienne-Nicolas Méhul and François-Joseph Gossec, with lyrics from the obscure poet Théodore Désorgues.) Dressed in sky-blue coat and nankeen trousers, Robespierre delivered two speeches in which he emphasised his concept of a Supreme Being: there would be no Christ, no Mohammed.

Someone was heard saying, "Look at the blackguard; it's not enough for him to be master, he has to be God." According to him: "Robespierre proclaimed to believe in the Supreme Being, and who only believed in the power of crime." Robespierre was also criticized by Vadier, Fouché, Barère, and Courtois, members of the Committee of General Security. Fouché had predicted to him his approaching fall. On 15 June, the president of the Committee of General Security, Vadier, on behalf of the two committees, presented a report on a new conspiracy by Catherine Théot, Christophe Antoine Gerle, and three others. He insinuated that Robespierre fitted her prophecies. His speech caused much laughter in the convention. Many of her followers were also supporters or friends of Robespierre, which made it seem as if he was attempting to create a new religion, with him as its god. Robespierre felt ridiculed and demanded on the 26th that the investigation of Théot be stopped and Fouquier-Tinville replaced. The deist Cult of the Supreme Being that he had founded and zealously promoted generated suspicion in the eyes of anticlericals and other political factions, who felt he was developing grandiose delusions about his place in French society.

== Hymn to the Supreme Being ==
The composer François-Joseph Gossec created an anthem for the Festival of the Supreme Being; the principles of the religion are clearly evident within it.

Supreme Being. Sovereign People. French Republic, anonymous print celebrating the Supreme Being, 1794. On the left is Voltaire, next to a bust of Lucius Junius Brutus, the legendary founder of the Roman Republic. On the right is Jean-Jacques Rousseau, accompanied by some children, a representation of the Rousseauian approach to early childhood education.

Père de l’univers, suprême intelligence,
Bienfaiteur ignoré des aveugles mortels,
Tu révélas ton être à la reconnaissance,
Qui seule éleva tes autels. (twice)

Ton temple est sur les monts, dans les airs, sur les ondes ;
Tu n’as point de passé, tu n’as point d’avenir,
Et sans les occuper, tu remplis tous les mondes,
Qui ne peuvent te contenir.

Tout émane de toi, grande et première cause,
Tout s’épure aux rayons de ta divinité ;
Sur ton culte immortel la morale repose,
Et sur les mœurs la liberté.

Pour venger leur outrage et ta gloire offensée,
L’Auguste Liberté, ce fléau des pervers,
Sortit au même instant de ta vaste pensée,
Avec le plan de l’Univers.

Dieu puissant ! elle seule a vengé ton injure ;
De son culte elle-même instruisant les mortels,
Leva le voile épais qui couvrait la nature,
Et vint absoudre tes autels.

Ô toi ! qui du néant, ainsi qu’une étincelle,
Fis jaillir dans les airs l’astre éclatant du jour,
Fais plus : verse en nos cœurs ta sagesse immortelle,
Embrase-nous de ton amour.

De la haine des rois anime la Patrie,
Chasse les vains désirs, l’injuste orgueil des rangs,
Le luxe corrupteur, la basse flatterie,
Plus fatale que les tyrans.

Dissipe nos erreurs, rends-nous bons, rends-nous justes,
Règne, règne au delà du tout illimité ;
Enchaîne la nature à tes décrets augustes,
Laisse à l’homme la Liberté.

Father of the universe, supreme intelligence,
Benefactor unknown to blind mortals,
You revealed Your being to gratitude,
Which alone raised Your altars. (twice)

Your temple is on the mountains, in the air, on the waves;
You have no past, you have no future,
And without occupying them, You fill all the worlds,
Which cannot contain You.

All emanates from You, great and first cause,
All is purified by the rays of Your divinity;
On Your immortal worship morality rests,
And on customs, liberty.

To avenge their outrage and Your offended glory,
August Liberty, that scourge of the perverse,
Sprang forth at the same instant from Your vast thought,
With the plan of the Universe.

Mighty God! She alone has avenged Your injury;
Instructing mortals with her own worship,
She lifted the thick veil that covered nature,
And came to absolve Your altars.

O You! You who, from nothingness, like a spark,
brought forth into the air the radiant star of day,
do more: pour into our hearts your immortal wisdom,
set us ablaze with your love.

From the hatred of kings, animate the Fatherland,
banish vain desires, the unjust pride of rank,
corrupting luxury, base flattery,
more fatal than tyrants.

Dispel our errors, make us good, make us just,
reign, reign beyond all boundlessness;
bind nature to your august decrees,
leave Liberty to humankind.

== Legacy ==
The Cult of the Supreme Being and its festival may have contributed to the Thermidorian Reaction and the downfall of Robespierre. According to Madame de Staël, it was from that time he was lost. With his death at the guillotine on 28 July 1794, the cult lost all official sanction and disappeared from public view. It was officially banned by Napoleon on 8 April 1802 with his Law on Cults of 18 Germinal, Year X.

== See also ==
- God-Building
- Gottgläubig
- Theophilanthropy
- Decadary Cult
