= Louis Marie de La Révellière-Lépeaux =

French politician (1753–1824)

Louis-Marie de La Révellière-Lépeaux
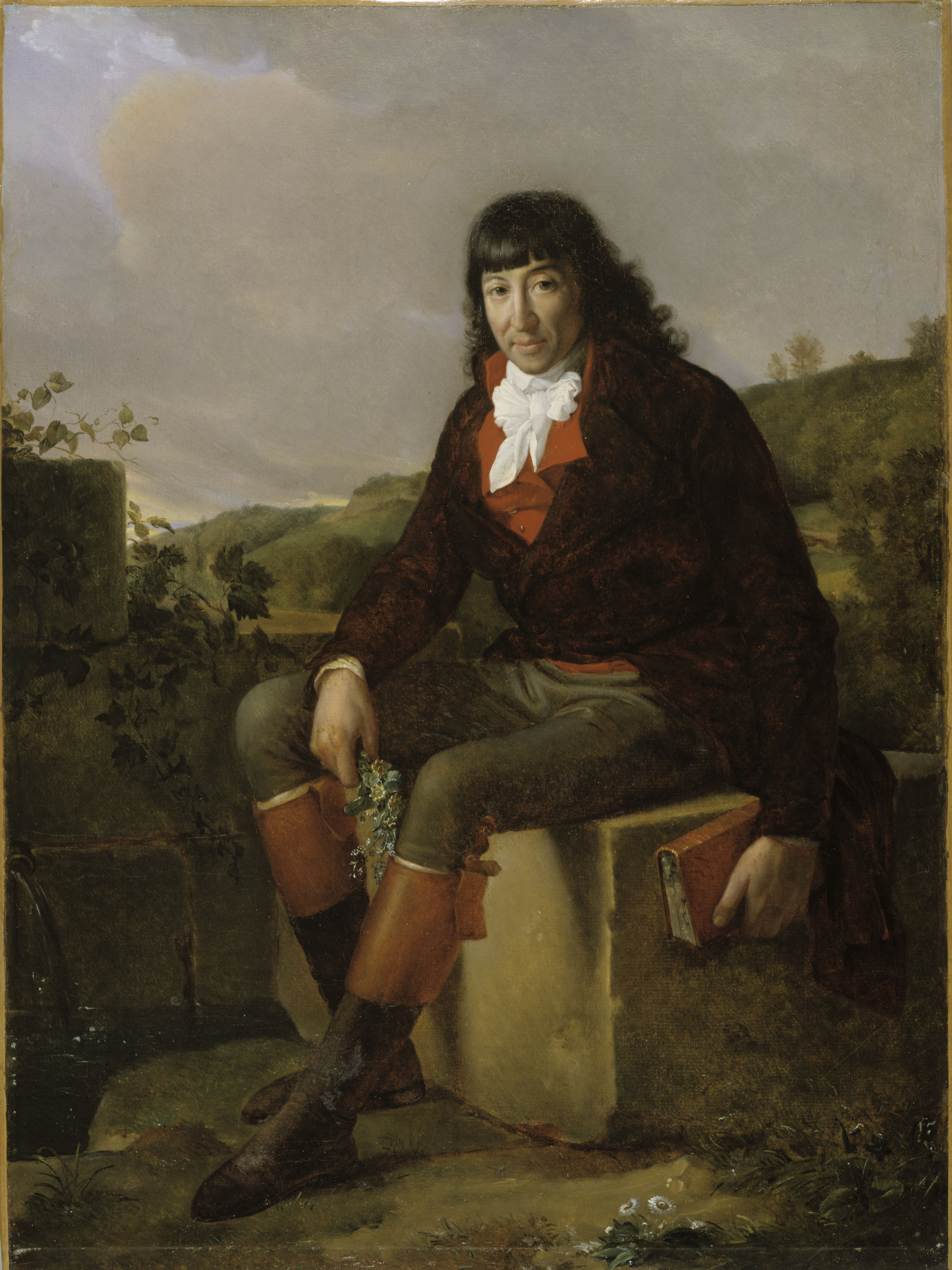
- Portrait by Gerard van Spaendonck after François Gérard, c. 1797

Member of the French Directory
- In office 1795 – 18 June 1799

Deputy to the National Convention
- In office 1792–1795

Deputy to the Estates-General of 1789
- In office 1789–1789

Member of the Committee of Public Safety
- In office 1795–1795

Personal details
- Born: 24 August 1753 Montaigu, Vendée, Kingdom of France
- Died: 24 March 1824 (aged 70)
- Resting place: Père Lachaise Cemetery
- Occupation: Lawyer

Louis Marie de La Révellière-Lépeaux (French pronunciation: [lwi maʁi də la ʁevɛljɛʁ lepo]; 24 August 1753 – 24 March 1824) was a deputy to the National Convention during the French Revolution. He later served as a prominent leader of the French Directory.

== Early life and education ==
He was born at Montaigu (Vendée), the son of J. B. de la Révellière. He adopted the name Lépeaux from a small property belonging to his family, and he was known locally as M. de Lépeaux. He studied law at Angers and Paris, being called to the bar in 1775.

== Career ==
A deputy to the Estates-General of 1789, he returned at the close of the session to Angers, where with his school-friends J. B. Leclerc and Urbain-René Pilastre he sat on the council of Maine-et-Loire, and had to deal with the first Vendéen outbreaks. In 1792 he was returned by the département to the Convention, and on 19 November he proposed the famous decree by which France offered protection to foreign nations in their struggle for liberty.

Although La Révellière-Lépeaux voted for the death of Louis XVI, he was not in general agreement with the extremists. He was proscribed with the Girondins in 1793, and remained in hiding until the revolt of 9 Thermidor (27 July 1794). After serving on the commission to prepare the initiation of the new constitution he became in July 1795 president of the Assembly, and shortly afterwards a member of the Committee of Public Safety. His name stood first on the list of directors elected, and he became president of the Directory.

Of his colleagues he was in alliance with Jean-François Rewbell and to a lesser degree with Paul Barras, but the greatest of his fellow-directors, Lazare Carnot, was the object of his undying hatred. His policy was marked by a bitter hostility to the Christian religion, which he proposed to supplant as a civilizing agent by theophilanthropy. The credit of the coup d'état of 18 Fructidor (4 September 1797), by which the allied directors made themselves supreme, La Révellière-Lépeaux arrogated to himself in his Mémoires, which in this as in other matters must be read with caution.

Compelled to resign by the Coup of 30 Prairial Year VII (18 June 1799), he lived in retirement in the country, and took no further part in public affairs even after his return to Paris ten years later.

== Death ==
He died on 24 March 1824.

== Publications ==
- Arrêtés du Directoire exécutif, concernant les militaires employés dans l'intérieur. A Paris: De l'Imprimerie du Dépôt des lois, 1796
- Arrêté du Directoire exécutif, concernant l'application à faire des lois sur les émigrés, aux habitans des départemens réunis qui ont passé en pays étranger pendant le cours de l'an II, et ne sont pas rentrés dans les trois mois de la publication de la loi du 9 vendémiaire, an IV. A Paris: De l'Imprimerie du Dépôt des lois, 1796
- Réflexions sur le Culte, sur les Cérémonies civiles et sur les Fêtes Nationales, 1797
- Réponses de L.M. Révellière-Lépeaux, aux dénonciations portées au Corps Législatif contre lui et ses anciens collègues, 1799
- Notice du patois vendéen. Précédée d'une biographie de l'auteur, 1867
- Mémoires de La Revellière-Lépeaux. Membre du Directoire executif de la République Française et de l'Institut national. Tome premier; Tome dieuxième; Tome troisième, publiés par son fils. Paris: Libraire Plon. 1895
