= Coup of 30 Prairial VII =

June 1799 French bloodless coup

The Coup of 30 Prairial Year VII (French: Coup d'État du 30 prairial an VII), also known as the Revenge of the Councils (French: revanche des conseils), was a bloodless coup in France that occurred on 16 June 1799 (30 Prairial Year VII by the French Republican Calendar). It left Emmanuel-Joseph Sieyès as the dominant figure of the French government, and prefigured the coup of 18 Brumaire that brought Napoleon Bonaparte to power.

== Prelude ==
The March–April 1799 elections of 315 new deputies into the two councils had produced a new neo-Jacobin (The Mountain) majority in these two bodies, particularly in the lower house. The Council of Five Hundred — the lower house in the legislature under the French Directory — became unhappy with the directors' conduct of the War of the Second Coalition, and in particular with their recall of General Jean Étienne Championnet, a former Jacobin. The Council of Ancients and Council of Five Hundred—the two legislative branches under the French Directory—voted an act declaring that the election of Director Jean-Baptiste Treilhard had been illegal, and on 29 Prairial/17 June had replaced him with Louis Gohier, erstwhile Jacobin deputy and minister during the French Convention.

== Coup ==
But the Councils were not satisfied with one removal. The new anti-Jacobin Director Emmanuel-Joseph Sieyès shared, in some degree, the Councils' sentiments and, by holding this view, it likely helped him into his new appointment to office in May 1799. He was glad to see his colleagues removed, and was perfectly willing to work with Jacobin generals to achieve his ends. In the Council of Five Hundred, the deputy Antoine, comte Boulay de la Meurthe, generally seen as a moderate, demanded the resignation or removal of directors Louis-Marie de La Révellière-Lépeaux and Philippe Antoine Merlin de Douai. In this he was soon joined not only by his own Council but by the Council of Ancients, and by directors Paul Barras, a Directory veteran since 1795 who was popularly known for his cunning, a trait which likely ensured that he was not to be yet another director who should have been removed, and by the newly appointed Sieyès.

When Révellière de Lépeaux and Merlin de Douai resisted, General Barthélémy Catherine Joubert, recently placed in command of the 17th military division (Paris), organized some troop movements of soldiers in Paris. By the evening of 18 June, Révellière-Lépeaux and Merlin had both tendered their resignations. Although nothing in this sequence of events formally violated the French Constitution of 1795, it is generally considered a coup.
