= Cult of Reason =

1793–1794 French state-sponsored atheist belief system

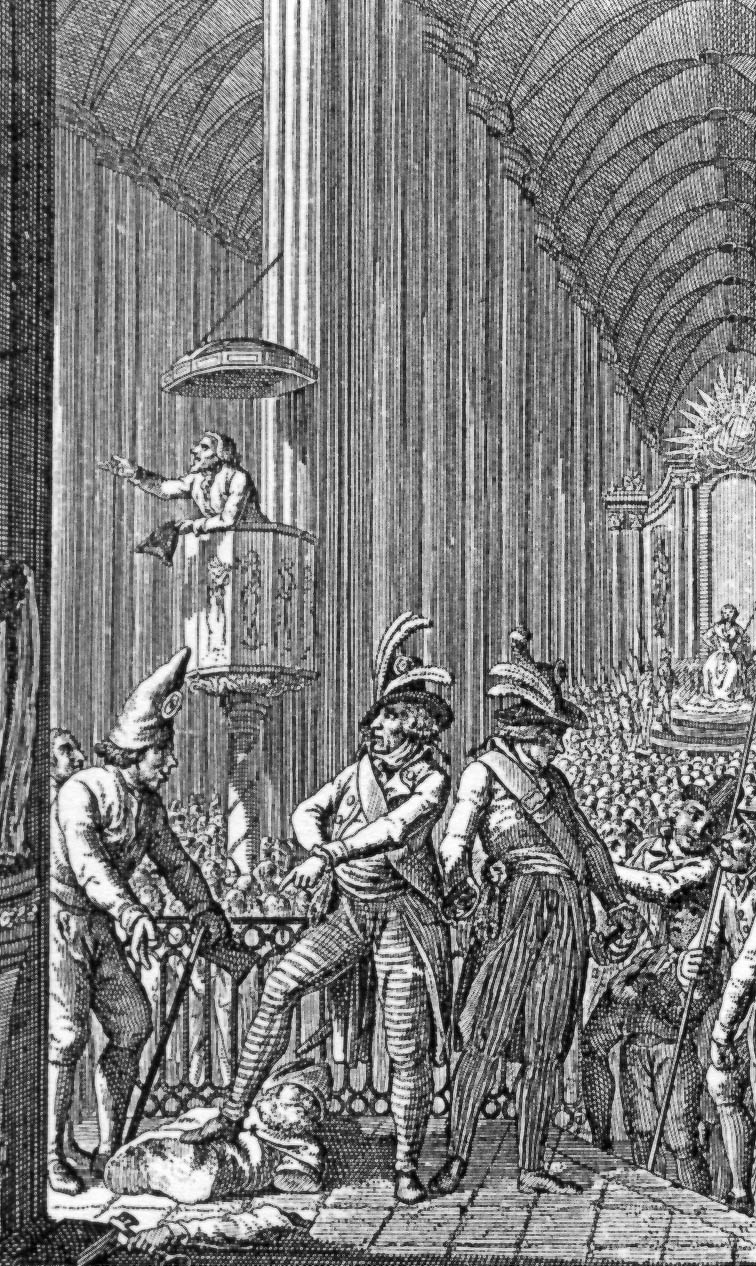
The Cathedral of Our Lady of Strasbourg turned into a Temple of Reason, depicted in 1794.

The Cult of Reason (French: Culte de la Raison) (Note: The word "cult" in French means "a form of worship", without any of its negative or exclusivist implications in English; its proponents intended it to be a universal congregation.) was France's first established state-sponsored atheistic religion, intended as a replacement for Christianity during the French Revolution. After holding sway for barely a year, in 1794 it was officially replaced by the rival deistic Cult of the Supreme Being, promoted by Robespierre. Both cults were officially banned in 1802 by Napoleon Bonaparte with his Law on Cults of 18 Germinal, Year X.

== Origins ==
Opposition to the French Catholic Church was integral among the causes of the French Revolution, and this anti-clericalism solidified into official government policy in 1792 after the French First Republic was declared. Most of the dechristianisation of France was motivated by political and economic concerns, and philosophical alternatives to the Church developed more slowly. Among the growing heterodoxy, the so-called Culte de la Raison became defined by some of the most radical revolutionaries like Anacharsis Cloots, Jacques Hébert, Antoine-François Momoro, Pierre-Gaspard Chaumette, and Joseph Fouché.

== Composition ==
Considerable debate has always persisted about the religiosity of the Cult of Reason. It was a hodgepodge of ideas and activities, a "multifarious phenomenon, marked by disorderliness". The Cult encompassed various elements of anticlericalism, including subordination of priests to secular authority, wealth confiscation from the Church, and doctrinal heresies both petty and profound. It was atheistic, but celebrated different core principles according to locale and leadership: most famous was Reason, but others were Liberty, Nature, and the victory of the Revolution.

=== Antoine-François Momoro ===
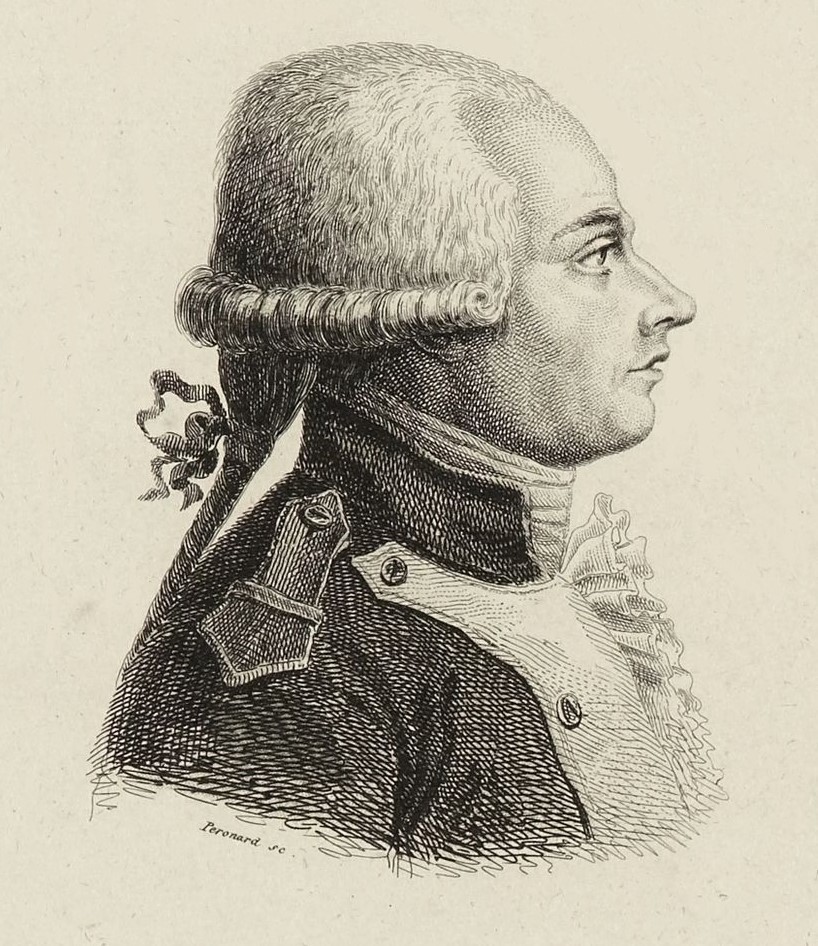
Antoine-François Momoro (1756–1794)

One of the more philosophical proponents was Antoine-François Momoro in Paris. In his hands, the capital city's Cult of Reason was explicitly anthropocentric. Its goal was the perfection of mankind through the attainment of Truth and Liberty, and its guiding principle to this goal was the exercise of Reason. In the manner of conventional religion, it encouraged acts of congregational worship and devotional displays to the ideal of Reason. A careful distinction was always drawn between the rational respect of Reason and the veneration of an idol: "There is one thing that one must not tire telling people," Momoro explained, "Liberty, reason, truth are only abstract beings. They are not gods, for properly speaking, they are part of ourselves."

The overarching theme of the Cult was summarized by Anacharsis Clootz, who declared at the Festival of Reason that henceforward there would be "one God only, Le Peuple". The Cult was intended as a civic religion—inspired by the works of Rousseau, Quatremère de Quincy, and Jacques-Louis David, it presented "an explicit religion of man".

Adherence to the Cult of Reason became a defining attribute of the Hébertist faction. It was also pervasive among the ranks of the sans-culottes. Numerous political factions, anti-clerical groups and events only loosely connected to the cult have come to be amalgamated with its name.

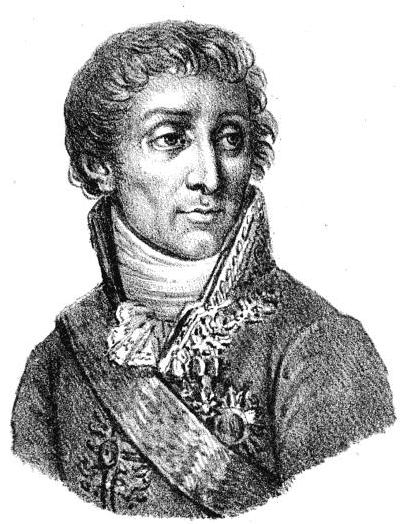
Joseph Fouché (1759–1820)

=== Joseph Fouché ===
As a military commander dispatched by the Jacobins to enforce their new laws, Fouché led a particularly zealous campaign of dechristianisation. His methods were brutal but efficient and helped spread the developing creed through many parts of France. In his jurisdictions, Fouché ordered all crosses and statues removed from graveyards, and he gave the cult one of its elemental tenets when he decreed that all cemetery gates must bear only one inscription—"Death is an eternal sleep." Fouché went so far as to declare a new civic religion of his own, virtually interchangeable with what would become known as the Cult of Reason, at a ceremony he dubbed the "Feast of Brutus" on 22 September 1793.

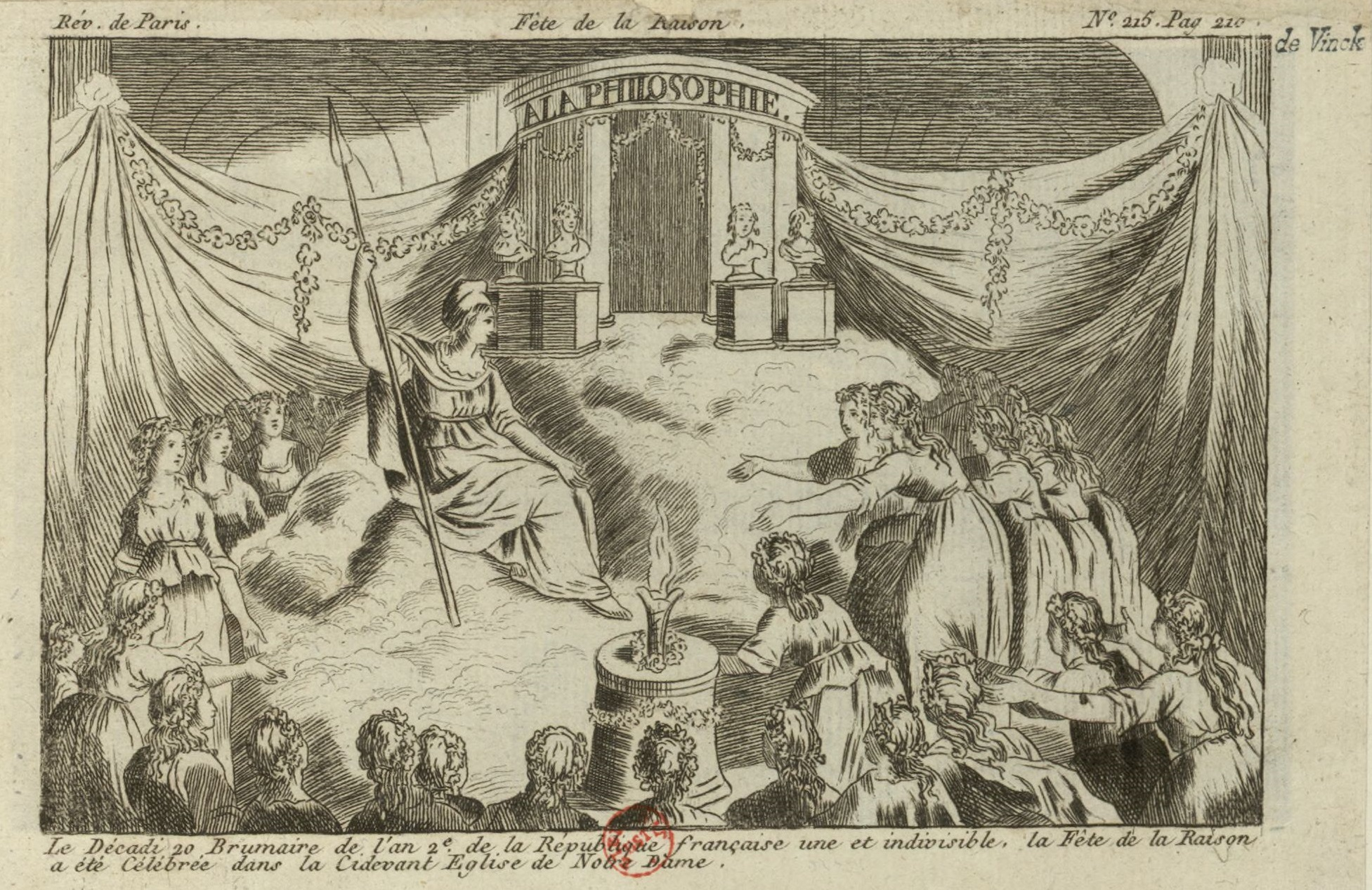
Fête de la Raison ("Festival of Reason"), Notre Dame, Paris.

== Festival of Reason ==
The official nationwide Fête de la Raison, supervised by Hébert and Momoro on 20 Brumaire, Year II (10 November 1793), came to epitomize the new republican way of religion. In ceremonies devised and organised by Chaumette, churches across France were transformed into modern Temples of Reason. The largest ceremony of all was at the cathedral of Notre Dame in Paris. The Christian altar was dismantled and an altar to Liberty was installed and the inscription "To Philosophy" was carved in stone over the cathedral's doors. Festive girls in white Roman dress and tricolor sashes milled around a costumed Goddess of Reason who "impersonated Liberty". A flame burned on the altar which was symbolic of truth. To avoid statuary and idolatry, the Goddess figures were portrayed by living women, and in Paris the role was played by Momoro's wife, Sophie, who is said to have dressed "provocatively" and, according to Thomas Carlyle, "made one of the best Goddesses of Reason; though her teeth were a little defective."

Before his retirement, Georges Danton had warned against dechristianizers and their "rhetorical excesses", but support for the Cult only increased in the zealous early years of the First Republic. By late 1793, it was conceivable that the Convention might accept the invitation to attend the Paris festival en masse, but the unshakeable opposition of Maximilien Robespierre and others like him prevented it from becoming an official affair. Undeterred, Chaumette and Hébert proudly led a sizable delegation of deputies to Notre Dame.

== Reaction ==
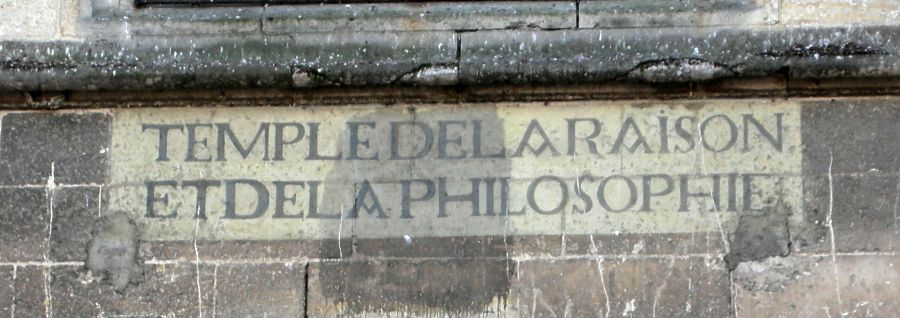
Inscription on church at Ivry-la-Bataille

Many contemporary accounts reported the Festival of Reason as a "lurid", "licentious" affair of scandalous "depravities", although some scholars have disputed their veracity. These accounts, real or embellished, galvanized anti-revolutionary forces and even caused many dedicated Jacobins like Robespierre to publicly separate themselves from the radical faction. Robespierre particularly scorned the Cult and denounced the festivals as "ridiculous farces".

In the spring of 1794, the Cult of Reason was faced with official repudiation when Robespierre, nearing complete dictatorial power during the Reign of Terror, announced his own establishment of a new, deistic religion for the Republic, the Cult of the Supreme Being. Robespierre denounced the Hébertistes on various philosophical and political grounds, specifically rejecting their perceived atheism. When Hébert, Momoro, Ronsin, Vincent, and others were sent to the guillotine on 4 Germinal, Year II (24 March 1794), the cult lost its most influential leadership; when Chaumette and other Hébertistes followed them four days later, the Cult of Reason effectively ceased to exist. Both cults were officially banned in 1802 by Napoleon Bonaparte with his Law on Cults of 18 Germinal, Year X.

== See also ==
- Dechristianisation of France during the French Revolution
- Religion of Humanity
- Cult of the Supreme Being
- God-Building
