= Sans-culottes =

Armed workers supporting the French Revolution

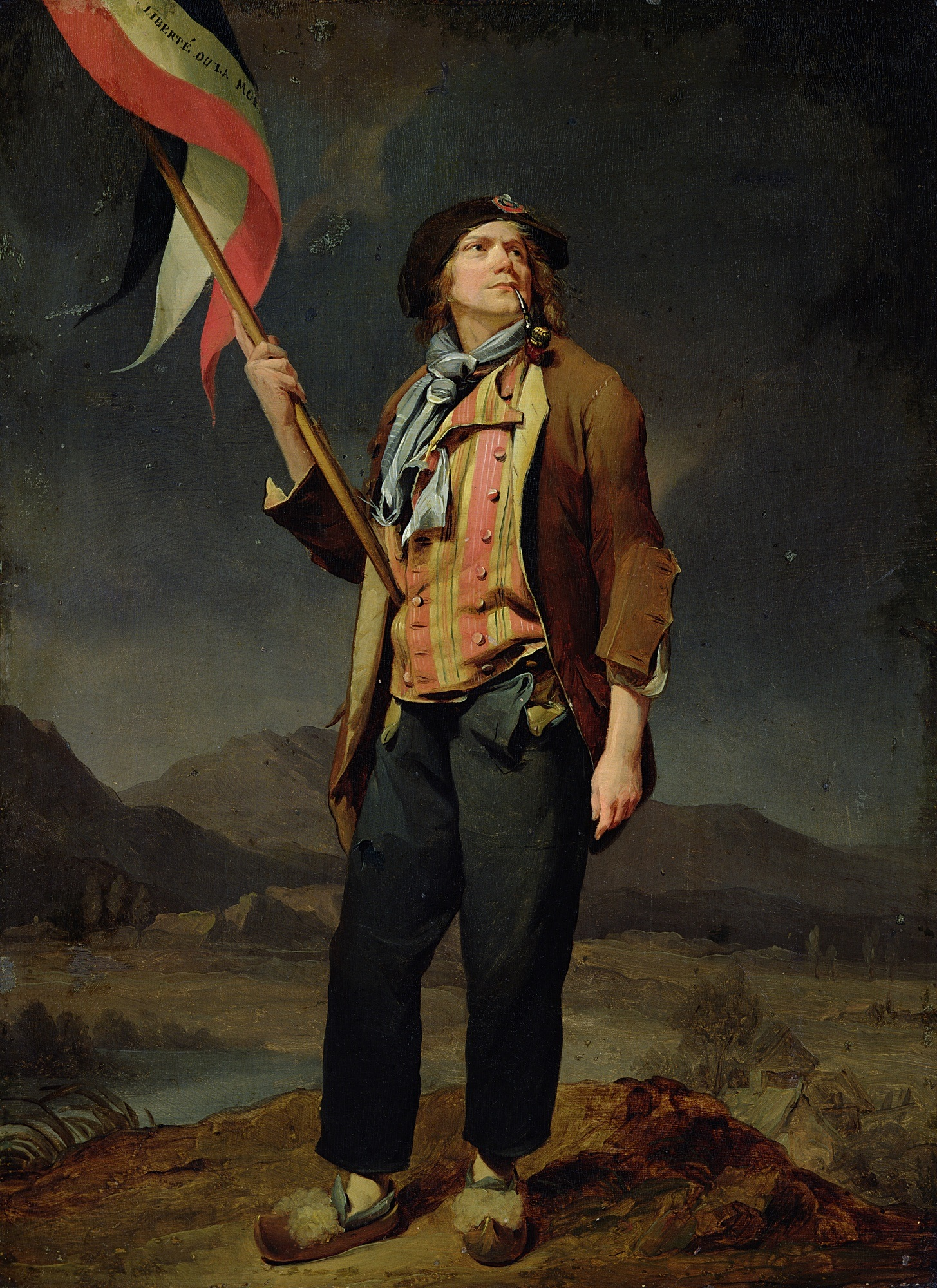
- Simon Chenard as a Sans-Culotte by Louis-Léopold Boilly, c. 1792
- Years active: 1791-1830
- Country: Kingdom of France - July Monarchy
- Major figures: François Chabot; Jacques Hébert; Jean-Paul Marat; Jacques Roux
- Influenced: The Montagnards

The sans-culottes (French: [sɑ̃kylɔt]; lit. 'without breeches') were the common people of the lower classes in late 18th-century France, a great many of whom became radical and militant partisans of the French Revolution in response to their poor quality of life under the Ancien Régime.

The name sans-culottes refers to their clothing, and through that to their lower-class status: culottes were the fashionable silk knee-breeches of the 18th-century nobility and bourgeoisie, and the working class sans-culottes wore pantaloons, or long trousers, instead. The sans-culottes, most of them urban labourers, served as the driving popular force behind the revolution. Journalists and political activists such as Jean-Paul Marat, Jacques Hébert, and Jacques Roux became influential spokesmen for the sans-culottes, although the movement had no formal leadership.

The word sans-culotte, which is opposed to "aristocrat", seems to have been used for the first time on 28 February 1791 by Jean-Bernard Gauthier de Murnan in a derogatory sense, speaking about a "sans-culottes army". The word came into vogue during the demonstration of 20 June 1792.

They were judged by the other revolutionaries as "radicals" because they advocated a direct democracy, that is to say, without intermediaries such as members of parliament. Though ill-clad and ill-equipped, with little or no support from the middle and upper classes, they made up the bulk of the Revolutionary army and were responsible for many executions during the early years of the French Revolutionary Wars.

According to Peter Stephen Du Ponceau, secretary and interpreter to Baron de Steuben, Steuben first used the expression sans culottes in 1778: "The Baron loved to speak of that dinner, and of his sans culottes as he called us. Thus the denomination was first invented in America, and applied to the brave officers and soldiers of our revolutionary army, at a time when, it could not be foreseen, that the name which honoured the followers of Washington would afterwards be assumed by the satellites of a Marat and a Robespierre".

== Political ideals ==
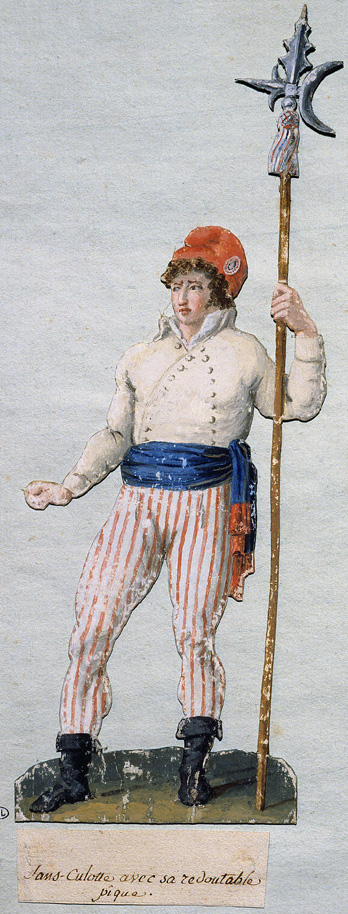
A sans-culotte with a halberd, by Jean-Baptiste Lesueur

The most fundamental political ideals of the sans-culottes were social equality, economic equality, and popular democracy. They supported the abolition of all the authority and privileges of the monarchy, nobility, and Roman Catholic clergy, the establishment of fixed wages, the implementation of price controls to ensure affordable food and other essentials, and vigilance against counter-revolutionaries.

The sans-culottes ... campaigned for a more democratic constitution, price controls, harsh laws against political enemies, and economic legislation to assist the needy.

They expressed their demands through petitions of the sections presented to the assemblies (the Legislative, and Convention) by the delegates. The sans-culottes had a third way of applying pressure to achieve their demands: the police and the courts received thousands of denunciations of traitors and supposed conspirators. The height of their influence spanned roughly from the original overthrow of the monarchy in 1792 to the Thermidorian Reaction in 1794.Throughout the revolution, the sans-culottes provided much of the popular support for radical factions in Paris, particularly the Enragés and the Hébertists. Revolutionaries such as Jacques Roux and Jacques Hébert acted as influential spokesmen for their political and economic demands.

In the summer of 1793 the sans-culottes, the Parisian enragés especially, accused even the most radical Jacobins of being too tolerant of greed and insufficiently universalist. From this far-left point of view, all Jacobins were at fault because all of them tolerated existing civil life and social structures.

The sans-culottes also populated the ranks of paramilitary forces charged with physically enforcing the policies and legislation of the revolutionary government, a task that commonly included violence and the carrying out of executions against perceived enemies of the revolution.

During the peak of their influence, the sans-culottes were seen as the truest and most authentic sons of the French Revolution, held up as living representations of the revolutionary spirit. During the height of revolutionary fervor, such as during the Reign of Terror when it was dangerous to be associated with anything counter-revolutionary, even public functionaries and officials actually from middle or upper-class backgrounds adopted the clothing and label of the sans-culottes as a demonstration of solidarity with the working class and patriotism for the new French Republic.

But by early 1794, as the bourgeois and middle-class elements of the revolution began to gain more political influence, the fervent working-class radicalism of the sans-culottes rapidly began falling out of favour within the National Convention. It was not long before Maximilien de Robespierre and the now dominant Jacobin Club turned against the radical factions of the National Convention, including the sans-culottes, despite their having previously been the strongest supporters of the revolution and its government. Several important leaders of the Enragés and Hébertists were imprisoned and executed by the very revolutionary tribunals they had supported. The execution of radical leader Jacques Hébert spelled the decline of the sans-culottes, and with the successive rise of even more conservative governments, the Thermidorian Convention and the French Directory, they were definitively silenced as a political force. After the defeat of the 1795 popular revolt in Paris, the sans-culottes ceased to play any effective political role in France until the July Revolution of 1830.

== Appearance ==
The distinctive costume of typical sans-culottes featured:

- the pantalon (long trousers) – in place of the culottes (silk knee-breeches) worn by the upper classes
- the carmagnole (short-skirted coat)
- sabots (a type of wooden clog), and
- the red Phrygian cap, also known as a "liberty cap"

== Events ==
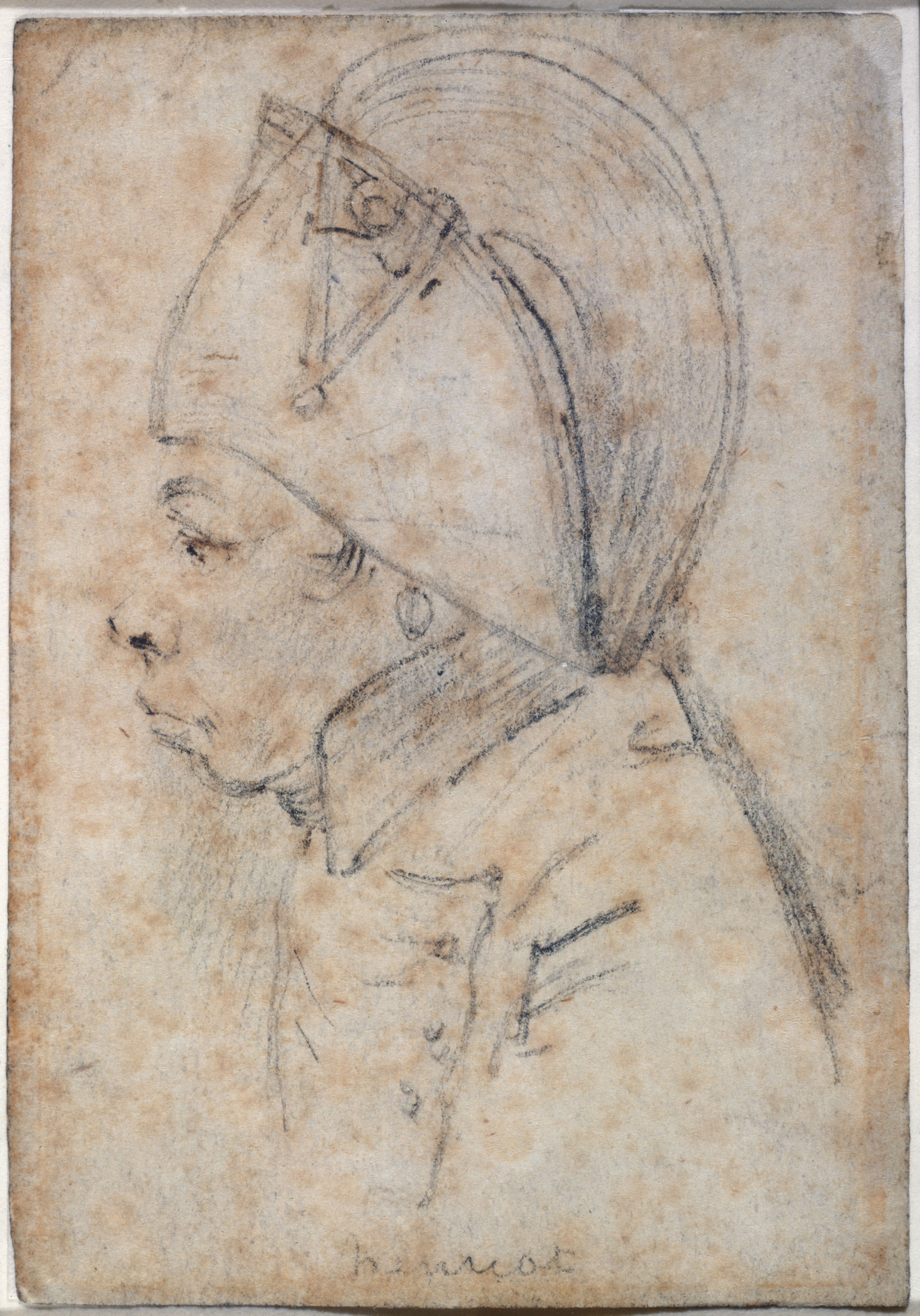
François Hanriot chef de la section des Sans-Culottes (Rue Mouffetard); drawing by Gabriel in the Carnavalet Museum

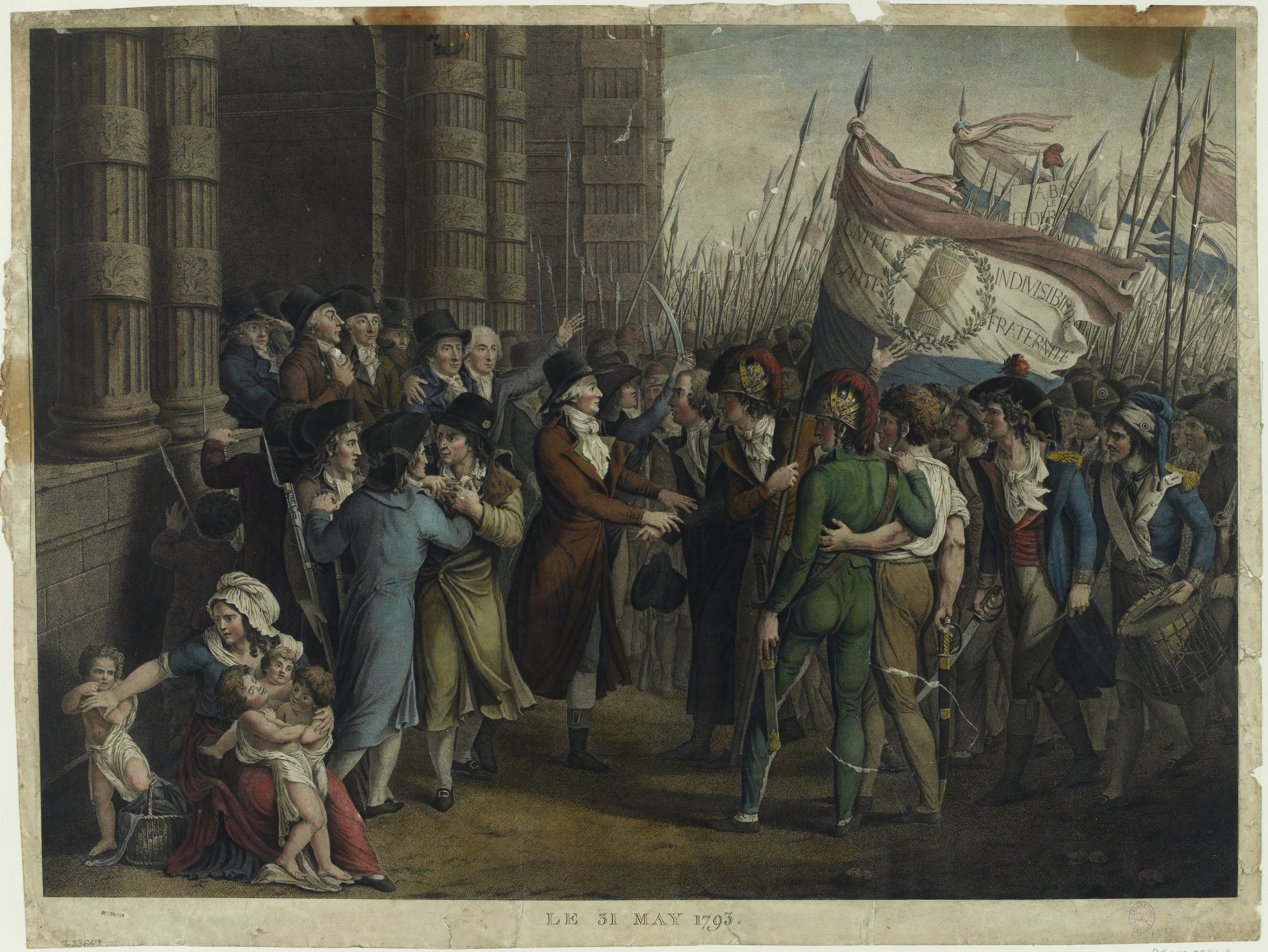
The uprising of the Parisian sans-culottes from 31 May to 2 June 1793. The scene takes place in front of the Deputies Chamber in the Tuileries. The depiction shows Marie-Jean Hérault de Séchelles and Pierre Victurnien Vergniaud.

On 27 April 1791, Robespierre opposed plans to reorganize the National Guard and restrict its membership to active citizens, largely property owners. He demanded the reconstitution of the army on a democratic basis to allow passive citizens. He felt that the army had to become the instrument of defence of the Revolution and no longer be a threat to it. On 28 April, despite Robespierre's intensive campaign, the principle of an armed bourgeois militia was definitively enacted in the Assembly.

Along with other Jacobins, he urged in his magazine the creation of a revolutionary army in Paris, consisting of 20,000 men, with the goal to defend "liberty" (the revolution), maintain order in the sections, and educate the members in democratic principles; an idea he borrowed from Jean-Jacques Rousseau and Machiavelli. According to Jean Jaures, he considered this even more important than the right to strike.

Following the king's veto of the Assembly's efforts to raise a militia of volunteers, the reinstatement of Brissotin ministers and suppression of non-juring priests, the monarchy faced an abortive Demonstration of 20 June 1792. Sergent-Marceau and Panis, the administrators of police, urged the sans-culottes to lay down their weapons, telling them it was illegal to present a petition in arms, although their march to the Tuileries was not banned. They invited the officials to join the procession and march along with them.

Early in the morning (10 August 1792) 30,000 Fédérés, and sans-culottes militants from the sections led a successful assault upon the Tuileries; according to Robespierre a triumph for the "passive" (non-voting) citizens. Sulpice Huguenin, head of the sans-culottes in the Faubourg Saint-Antoine, was appointed provisional president of the Insurrectionary Commune.

In Spring 1793, after the defection of Dumouriez, Robespierre urged the creation of a "sans-culotte army" to sweep away any conspirator.

On 1 May, the crowds threatened armed insurrection if the emergency measures demanded (price control) were not adopted. On 8 and 12 May Robespierre repeated in the Jacobin club the necessity of founding a revolutionary army consisting of sans-culottes, paid by a tax on the rich, to beat the aristocrats inside France and the convention. Every public square should be used to produce arms and pikes. On 18 May, Marguerite-Élie Guadet proposed to examine the "exactions" and to replace municipal authorities.

As rioting persisted, a commission of inquiry of twelve members, with a very strong Girondin majority, was set up to investigate the anarchy in the communes and the activities of the sans-culottes. On 28 May, the Paris Commune accepted the creation of a sans-culottes army to enforce revolutionary laws. Petitioners from the sections and the Commune appeared at the bar of the Convention at about five o'clock in the afternoon on 31 May. They demanded that a domestic revolutionary army should be raised and that the price of bread should be fixed at three sous a pound, that nobles holding senior rank in the army should be dismissed, that armouries should be created for arming the sans-culottes, the departments of State purged, suspects arrested, the right to vote provisionally reserved to sans-culottes only, and a fund set apart for the relatives of those defending their country and for the relief of aged and infirm. According to Hampson, the subject is quite extraordinarily complicated and obscure. The next day all Paris was in arms.

Hanriot was ordered to march his National Guard, by this time mostly consisting of sans-culottes, from the town hall to the Palais National. On 2 June 1793, a large force of supposedly 80,000 sans-culottes and National Guards led by Hanriot, surrounded the convention with 160–172 guns.

On 4 September, the sans-culottes again invaded the convention. They demanded tougher measures against rising prices and the setting up of a system of terror to root out the counter-revolution. The sans-culottes took an especially active interest in the revolutionary army.

Barère voiced the Committee of Public Safety's support for the measures desired by the assembly: he presented a decree that was passed immediately, establishing a paid armed force of 6,000 men and 1,000 gunners "designed to crush the counter-revolutionaries, to execute wherever the need arises the revolutionary laws and the measures of public safety that are decreed by the National Convention, and to protect provisions (A force of citizen-soldiers which could go into the countryside to supervise the requisition of grain, to prevent the manoeuvres of rich égoistes and deliver them up to the vengeance of the laws)".) For that reason, twelve travelling tribunals (with moveable guillotines) were set up.

Three months later, on 4 December, the departmental revolutionary armies (except in Paris) were banned on proposal of Tallien. The sections lost all rights to control their delegates and officials.

On 4 March 1794, there were rumours of uprising in the Cordeliers club. The Hébertists hoped that the National Convention would expel Robespierre and his Montagnard supporters. The sans-culottes did not respond, and Hanriot refused to cooperate. On 13 March Hébert, the voice of the sans-culottes, had been using the latest issue of Le Père Duchesne to criticise Robespierre. On 18 March Bourdon attacked the Commune and the sans-culottes army. Jacques Hébert, Ronsin, Vincent, Momoro, Clootz, De Kock were arrested on charges of complicity with foreign powers (William Pitt the Younger) and guillotined on 24 March. On 27 March the infantry and cavalry of the revolutionary army, for eight months active in Paris and surroundings, were finally disbanded, except their artillery. (Hanriot was denounced by the Revolutionary Tribunal as an accomplice of Hébert, but seems to have been protected by Robespierre.)

== Montagnard influence ==
The working class was especially hurt by a hail storm which damaged grain crops in 1788, which caused bread prices to skyrocket. While the peasants of rural France could sustain themselves with their farms, and the wealthy aristocracy could still afford bread, the urban workers of France, the group that comprised the sans-culottes, suffered. In the city, the division grew between the sans-culottes and these wealthy aristocrats; the former had a particular hostility "towards those with large private incomes."

The faction known as the Montagnards expressed concern for the working classes of France. When the National Convention met to discuss the fate of the former king Louis XVI in 1792, the sans-culottes vehemently opposed a proper trial, instead opting for an immediate execution. The moderate Girondin faction voted for a trial, but the radical Montagnards sided with the sans-culottes, deeming that a trial was not necessary, and won with a slim majority. Louis XVI was executed on January 21, 1793.

The demands of the sans-culottes did not stop with the execution of the King, and the Montagnards worked hard to fulfil their mounting orders. This increased pressure from the radical masses exacerbated the ideological split between the Montagnards and the Girondins, and tensions began to grow within the convention. Eventually, by May 1793, the Montagnards worked with the National Guard—which was, at this time, mostly sans-culottes—to depose many of the Girondin deputies. Jeremy Popkin writes, "[the Montagnards and the sans-culottes] surrounded the Convention, and two days later the intimidated assembly suspended twenty-nine Girondin deputies. The defeated Girondin leaders fled to the provinces. The Montagnards were left in control of the Convention, which itself was clearly at the mercy of whoever could command the armed sans-culottes battalions." Now, whoever was in control of France's destiny had to answer to the sans-culottes, who "effectively exercised legislative power" in situations of unrest. Otherwise, they would risk a similar uprising and their own exile, or possibly even execution. This political shift towards radicalism would soon turn into the Reign of Terror.

== Reign of Terror ==
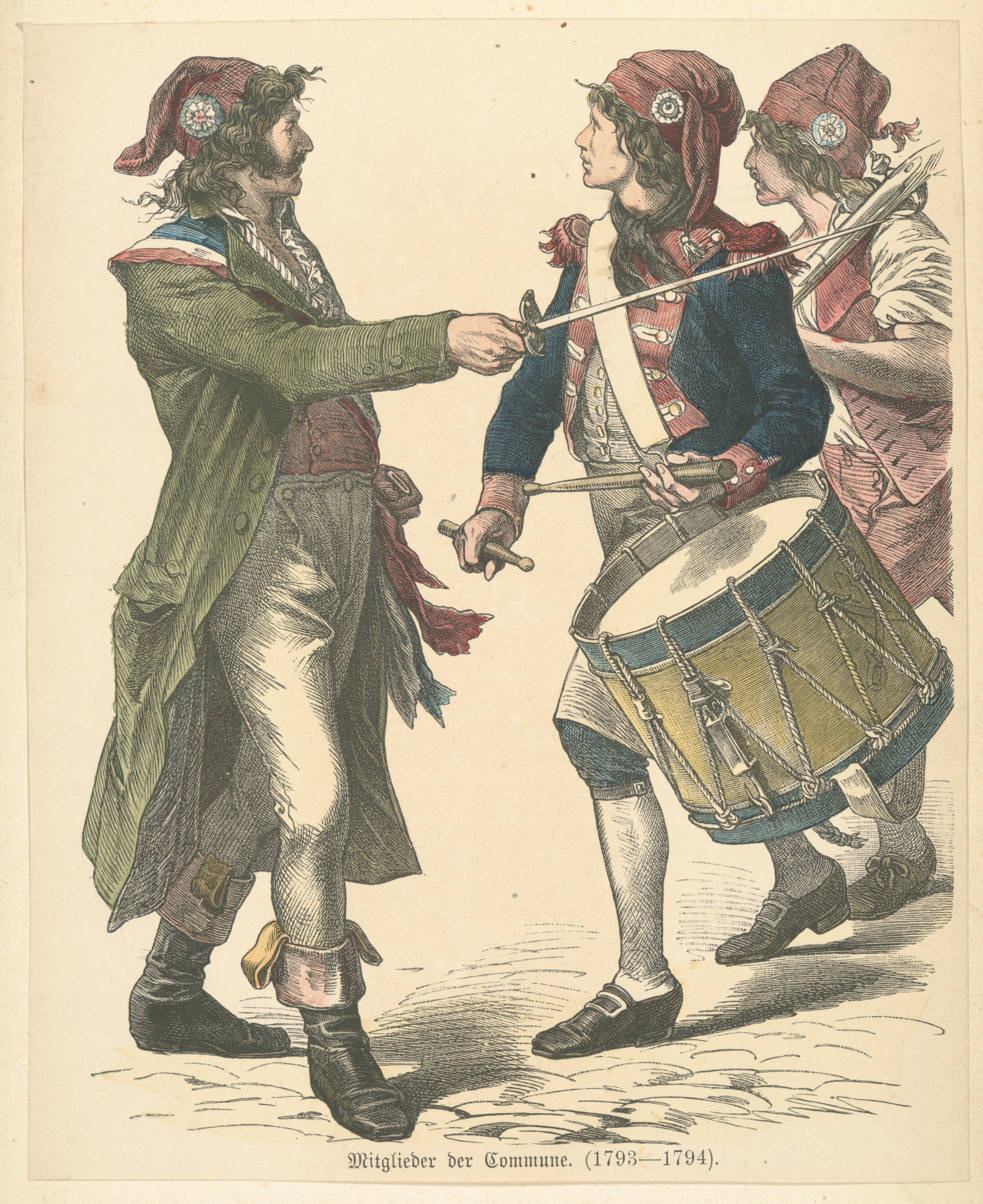
A sans-culottes (left, wearing full length trousers), compared with figures wearing culottes (right, knee length breeches)

The mass violence of the sans-culottes created a lasting impact during the Reign of Terror. These revolutionaries allied themselves most readily with those in power who promised radical change. The sans-culottes believed in a complete upheaval of the government, pushing for the execution of any that were considered corrupt by the leaders, even going as far as wanting "the enemies of the republic [to] hang-main and the guillotine to stand like the first patriots, the finisher of the law." The support of the sans-culottes could be used as a political weapon to get rid of enemies of the Revolution. The key to Robespierre's Terror lay in their willingness and ability to mobilize. Thus, the Committee leaders used speeches to gain their support. In a speech On the Principles of Political Morality. Robespierre proclaimed: "It has been said that terror was the mainspring of despotic government. Does your government, then, resemble a despotism? Yes, as the sword which glitters in the hands of liberty's heroes resembles the one with which tyranny's lackeys are armed." Robespierre expressed a desire for liberty that the sans-culottes admired. They pushed the committee for radical changes and often found a voice with Robespierre.

== Legacy ==
The popular image of the sans-culotte has gained currency as an enduring symbol for the passion, idealism and patriotism of the common man of the French Revolution. The term sans-culottism, sans-culottisme in French, refers to this idealized image and the themes associated with it. Many public figures and revolutionaries who were not strictly working class styled themselves citoyens sans-culottes in solidarity and recognition. However, in the period immediately following the Thermidorian Reaction, the sans-culottes and other far-left political factions were heavily persecuted and repressed by the likes of the Muscadins.

The French Republican Calendar at first termed the complementary days at the end of the year Sansculottides; however, the National Convention suppressed the name when adopting the Constitution of the Year III (1795) and substituted the name jours complémentaires ("additional days").

== Analysis ==
According to Sally Waller, part of the sans-culottes mantra was "permanent anticipation of betrayal and treachery". The members of the sans-culottes were constantly on edge and fearing betrayal, which can be attributed to their violent and radical rebellion tactics. Marxist historian Eric Hobsbawm observes that the sans-culottes were a "shapeless, mostly urban movement of the labouring poor, small craftsmen, shopkeepers, artisans, tiny entrepreneurs and the like". He further notes they were organised notably in the local political clubs of Paris and "provided the main striking-force of the revolution". Hobsbawm writes that these were the actual demonstrators, rioters and constructors of the street barricades. However, Hobsbawm maintains, sans-culottism provided no real alternative to the bourgeois radicalism of the Jacobins; from Hobsbawm's Marxist perspective, the ideal of the sans-culottes, which sought to express the interests of the "little men" who existed between the poles of the bourgeoisie and the proletariat, was contradictory and ultimately unrealizable.

The Marxist historian Albert Soboul emphasized the importance of the sans-culottes as a social class, a sort of proto-proletariat that played a central role in the French Revolution. That view has been sharply attacked by scholars who say the sans-culottes were not a class at all. As one historian observes, Soboul's concept has not been used by scholars in any other period of French history.

== Modern colloquial usage ==
The term "culottes" in more recent French describes women's underpants, an article of clothing that has little or no relation to the historical culottes, but now also refers to apparent skirts that are actually split with two legs. The term sans-culottes has been used colloquially to mean not wearing underpants.

== See also ==
- The first man who was called a sans-culotte was the poet Nicolas Joseph Laurent Gilbert; also Robespierre and Pétion de Villeneuve were described as sans-culottes before the word came in vogue.
- Croppy
- Descamisado
- François Chabot
- Lazzaroni (Naples)
- Lumpenproletariat
- Pétroleuses
