= Stanislas-Marie Maillard =

French volunteer in the attack on the Bastille

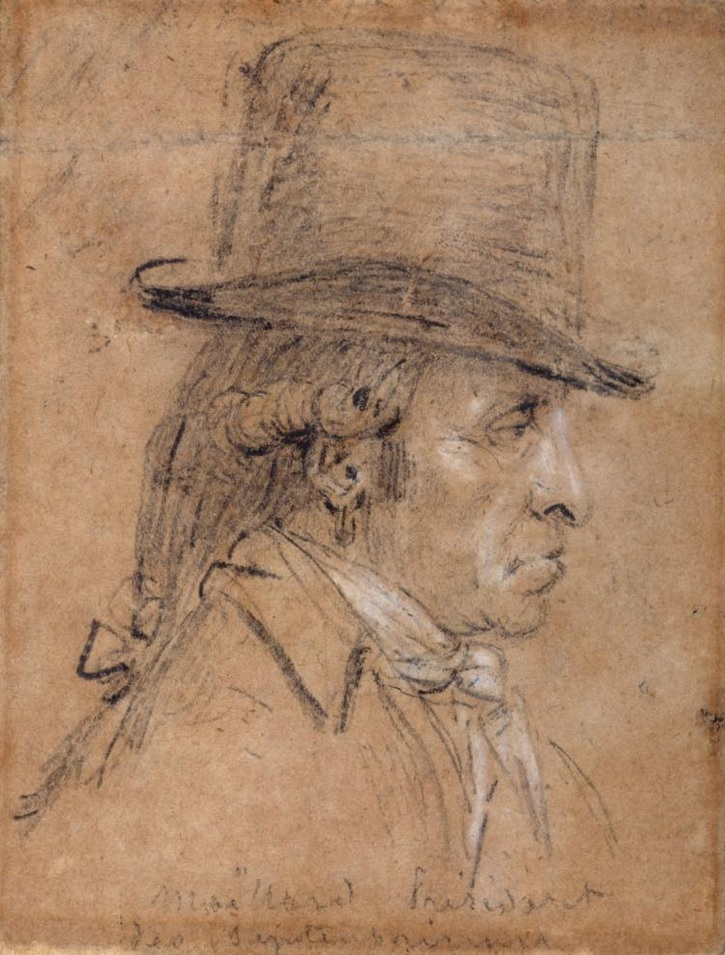
Stanislas-Marie Maillard, sketch by Georges-François-Marie Gabriel, Paris, Musée Carnavalet.

Stanislas-Marie Maillard (11 December 1763 – 11 April 1794) was a captain of the Bastille Volunteers. As a national guardsman, he participated in the attack on the Bastille, being the first revolutionary to get into the fortress, and also accompanied the women who marched to Versailles on 5 October 1789. Maillard testified in court to the events at Versailles.

== Activities ==
Maillard participated in the taking of the Bastille on 14 July 1789. Henceforth bearing the title “Captain of the Volunteers of the Bastille”, he took an active part in most of the landmark revolutionary events. Recruited into the ranks of the “Hébertistes”, he was charged by the Committee of Public Safety with the task of organizing a revolutionary police force. He was also one of the leaders of the “October Days”, which took place on 5 and 6 October 1789, but for which he was present only on 5 October. The October days consisted of the famous march of the poissardes, or market women, to Versailles, to demand bread and justice against the royal bodyguards who had supposedly disrespected the revolution. Presenting himself as the spokesperson for the women's grievances, Maillard presented the following statement before the Constituent Assembly: « Nous sommes à Versailles pour demander du pain et en même temps pour punir les gardes du corps qui ont insulté la cocarde patriotique1. », or “We have come to Versailles to demand bread, and to request the punishment of the royal body-guards who have insulted the patriotic cockade”. This latter statement referred to rumors that, at the banquet of 2 October 1789, put on for the visiting Flanders regiment by the royal bodyguards, the national cockade had been trampled underfoot. The marchers themselves behaved violently on the 5th, insulting the Queen and the priests they met in the National Assembly, and clashing with the guards of the palace. (The 6th was a disaster for which he was not present: two royal bodyguards were murdered, and the palace itself was forcibly entered, and the queen's chambers penetrated.)

Named captain of the national guard in 1790, he signed, on 17 July 1791, the petition of the Champs-de-Mars, which proclaimed the creation of a Republic. Charged by the Commune of Paris in September 1792 to put an end to recent wholesale massacres of prisoners, he would play a controversial role. He seems to have aided and abetted the massacres, having loaned them an air of legality with his presence. Others credit him with having a “providential role" in the affair. Posterity knows him as “the grand judge of the Abbaye” or “Chief of the Murderers”.

While serving as president of the improvised tribunal at the Prison de l’Abbaye, he released the marquis Charles François de Virot de Sombreuil, who had been saved by his daughter Marie-Maurille, to whom legend confers the status of l'héroïne au verre de sang. This name refers to the legend that, in order to spare her father's life, she was compelled to drink a glass of blood. Jules Claretie, in the role of second-in-command, gave an eyewitness account of Maillard in the role of judge: “Maillard was a young man of thirty, large, dark, with matted hair. He wears stockings, and a grey habit with large pockets."

Detained twice under The Terror, due to his ties with the Hébertists, he died, in misery, of tuberculosis.
