= Simon Chenard as a Sans-Culotte =

Painting by Louis-Léopold Boilly

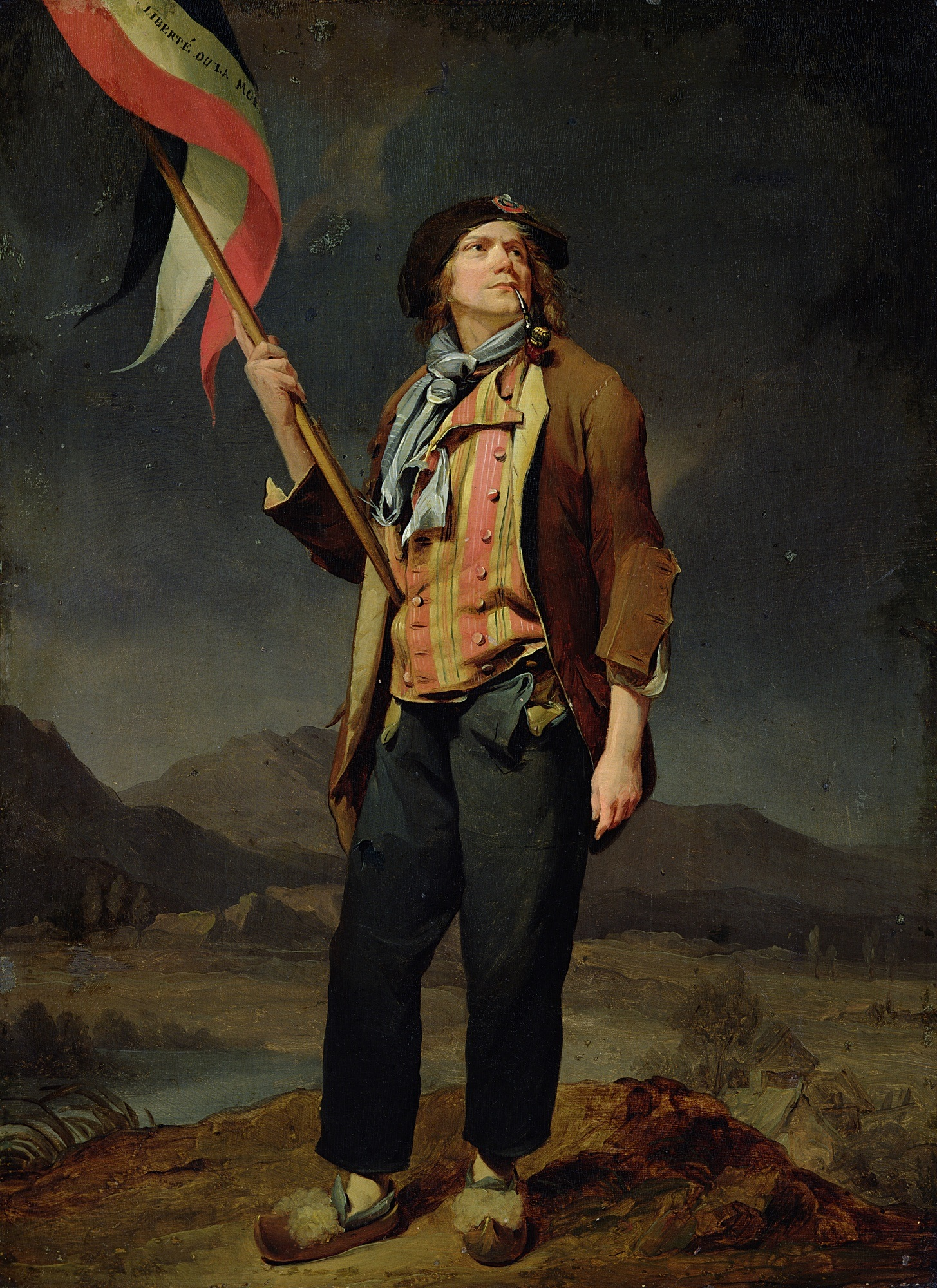
- Artist: Louis-Léopold Boilly
- Year: 1792
- Type: Oil on canvas, portrait painting
- Dimensions: 33.5 cm × 25.4 cm (13.2 in × 10.0 in)
- Location: Musée Carnavalet, Paris

Simon Chenard as a Sans-Culotte (French: Portrait du chanteur Simon Chenard en costume de sans-culotte) is an oil on canvas portrait painting by the French artist Louis-Léopold Boilly from 1792. The painting is also known as Flag-bearer at the Festival of the Liberation of the Savoyens. It is held in the Musée Carnavalet, in Paris, having been acquired in 1892.

== History and description ==
The painting depicts the singer Simon Chenard (1758-1832) holding up a French tricolour, dressed as a Sans-culotte. It was inspired by the costume he had worn at the Fête de la Liberté (Liberty's Party), on 14 October 1792, where he had sung the French Revolutionary anthem La Marseillaise. The Fête was held to celebrate the French conquest and annexation of Savoy, following their surprising victory at the Battle of Valmy, on 20 September 1792, where the French defeated the Kingdom of Prussia and the Holy Roman Empire. The flag has the Jacobin slogan "Liberty or Death" written on it. Chenard stands still, looking into the sky, as if searching for inspiration, and has a pipe in his mouth. He also is wearing clogs, to emphasize the humble status of the character he portrays. The sky is dark and cloudy, which indicates that the scene takes place at night. A landscape is the background for his portrait, with a river or a lake, at his left, and some mountains.

Rolf Reichardt and Hubertus Kohle state that the work: "In a remarkable mixing of categories typical of revolutionary art, Boilly's small picture unites portrait, genre and history painting, with the aim of eliminating social categories (...) to give artistic expression to the break with the hierarchical social order of the Estates."

== Bibliography ==
- Hould, Claudette. Images of the French Revolution. Musée du Québec, 1989.
- Reichardt, Rolf & Kohle, Hubertus. Visualizing the Revolution: Politics and the Pictorial Arts in Late Eighteenth-century France. Reaktion Books, 2008.
- Smith, Anthony D. The Nation Made Real: Art and National Identity in Western Europe, 1600-1850. OUP Oxford, 2013.
- Whitlum- Cooper, Francesca. Boilly: Scenes of Parisian Life. National Gallery Company, 2019.
