= Pierre-Ulric Dubuisson =

French actor, playwright and theatre director

Pierre-Ulric Dubuisson (French pronunciation: [pjɛʁ ylʁik dybɥisɔ̃]; 23 January 1746 in Laval, Mayenne – 24 March 1794) was an 18th-century French actor, playwright and theatre director.

Sympathetic to the Hébertists he was denounced by Robespierre as having intended to sow discord among the Jacobins and was tried by the Revolutionary Court. He was sentenced to death and guillotined with other Hébertists on 24 March 1794 at the age of 48 years.

== Works ==
Theatre

- 1778: L'École des pères, ou les Effets de la prévention, Cap-Français, 21 March
- 1780: Nadir, ou Thamas-Kouli-Kan, tragedy in 5 acts and in verse, Paris, Théâtre de la Nation (Salle des Machines), 31 August
- 1782: Le Vieux Garçon, comedy in 5 acts, in verse, Théâtre de l'Odéon, 16 December.
- 1783: Trasime et Timagène, tragedy in 5 acts and in verse, Rouen, Grand Théâtre.
- 1785: Le Nouveau Sorcier, comedy en trois acts, Théâtre de Gand, 29 January
- 1785: Albert et Émilie, tragedy, Paris, Théâtre de l'Odéon, 30 April
- 1786: Scanderberg, tragedy in 5 acts and in verse, Théâtre de l'Odéon, 9 May
- 1786: Le Roi Théodore à Venise, opera héroï-comique in 4 acts, music by Giovanni Paisiello, Vienna.
- 1786: Hélène et Francisque, opéra-comique en 4 actes, Château de Versailles, August
- 1789: L'Impresario in angustie, ou le Directeur dans l'embarras, opera bouffe in 2 acts, music by Domenico Cimarosa, Théâtre de Monsieur, 6 May Text online
- 1789: L'Arbre de Diane, comédie en vaudeville in 3 acts, Brussels, Théâtre de la Monnaie, 12 September.
- 1790: Les Époux mécontents, opéra-comique en 3 actes, music by Stephen Storace, Théâtre Montansier, 12 April.
- 1790: La Villageoise enlevée, comédie en vaudeville in 3 acts, Théâtre-Français, 5 July.
- 1790: Le Curieux indiscret, opera bouffe in 3 acts, Théâtre Montansier, 23 September
- 1791: Les Époux mécontents, ou le Divorce, Brussels, Théâtre de la Monnaie, 4 March
- 1792: La Revanche, ou les Deux Frères, opera in 3 acts, Théâtre des Amis de la Patrie, 11 January
- 1792: Les Talismans, opera in 3 acts, Théâtre des Amis de la Patrie, 12 January
- 1792: Flora, opera in 3 acts, Théâtre des Amis de la Patrie, 4 February
- 1794: Zélia, ou le Mari à deux femmes, drama in three acts mingled with music, after Goethe, music by Prosper-Didier Deshayes, Théâtre des Amis de la Patrie, 3 June Text online
- 1796: Zelia, ou la Grille enchantée, Comédie Italienne, 26 November
- undated: Stella, drama in 3 acts, mingled with music, after Goethe, Text online

Varia

- 1771: Le Tableau de la volupté, ou les Quatre parties du jour, poem in free verse.
- 1778: Abregé de la Révolution de l'Amérique anglaise, depuis le commencement de l'année 1774 jusqu'au premier janvier 1778, Text online
- 1785: Nouvelles considérations sur St-Domingue, en réponse à celles de M. H. D..
- 1785: Lettres critiques et politiques sur les colonies et le commerce des villes maritimes de France, adressées à G.-T. Raynal, with Dubucq, Text online

== Bibliography ==
- Auguste-Philippe Herlaut, Autour d'Hébert. I. Deux témoins de la Terreur : le citoyen Dubuisson, le cidevant baron de Haindel, Paris, Clavreuil, 1958
- Louis-Gabriel Michaud, Biographie universelle ancienne et moderne, Paris, 1855, t. XL;
- Jean-Barthélemy Hauréau, Histoire littéraire du Maine. Paris, 1872, t. IV.;
- Archives nationales, W lA 76 et W 339. T 1683. #°406 and T 1685, #230.;
