= Antoine-François Momoro =

French printer, bookseller and politician

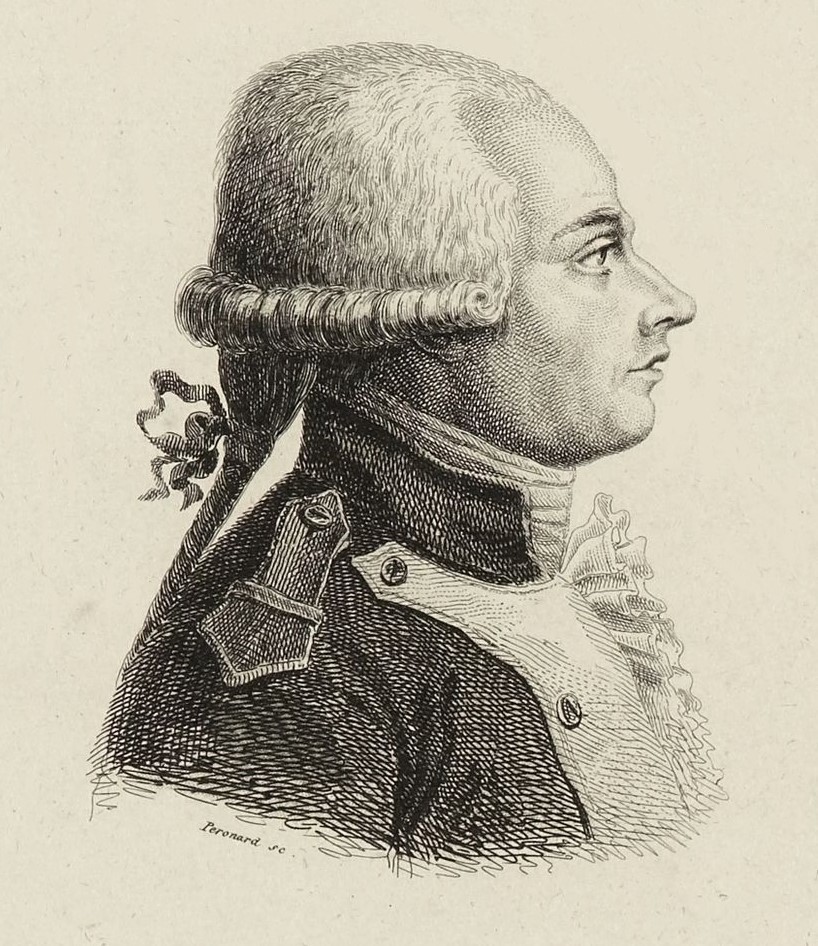
- Antoine-François Momoro
- Born: 1756; Besançon, France
- Died: 24 March 1794 (aged 37–38); Paris, France
- Occupation: Printer
- Known for: Originator of the phrase ″Unité, Indivisibilité de la République; Liberté, Égalité, Fraternité ou la mort″, one of the mottos of the French Republic
- Spouse: Sophie Momoro (1786–1794)
- Children: 4

Signature
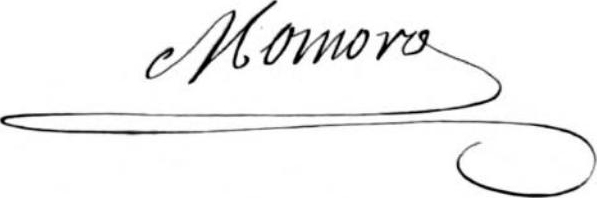

Antoine-François Momoro (French pronunciation: [ɑ̃twan fʁɑ̃swa mɔmɔʁo]; 1756 – 24 March 1794) was a French printer, bookseller and politician during the French Revolution. An important figure in the Cordeliers club and in Hébertisme, he is the originator of the phrase ″Unité, Indivisibilité de la République; Liberté, égalité, fraternité ou la mort″, one of the mottoes of the French Republic.

== Life ==
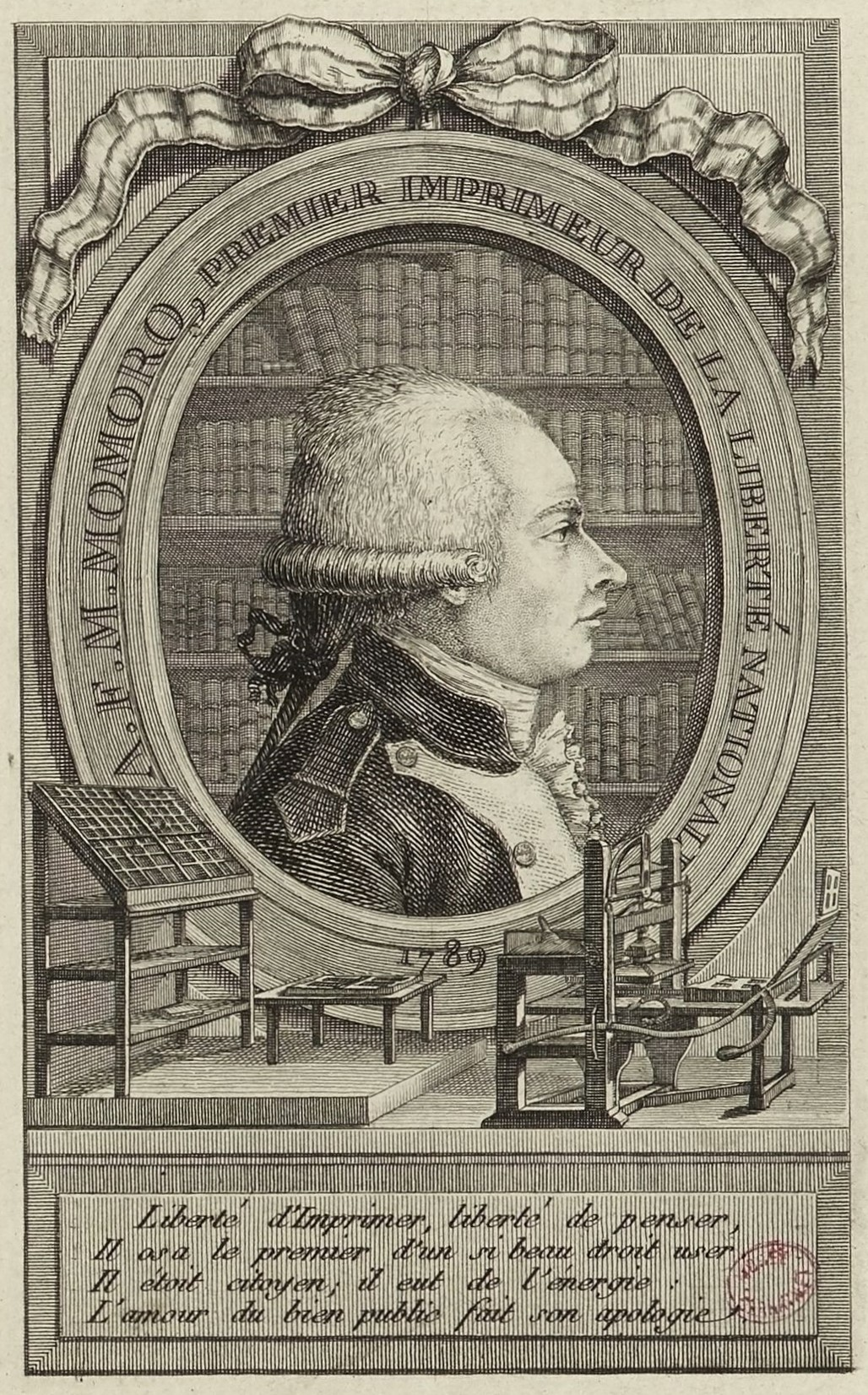
Antoine François Momoro, "First Printer of National Liberty" (Musée Carnavalet)

=== "First Printer of Liberty" ===
Momoro's family was originally from Spain but settled in the Franche-Comté region of eastern France. Antoine-François Momoro studied in his home town and moved to Paris while still very young. He showed a particular talent as a typographer and he was admitted to the Parisian printers' guild in 1787. He was one of many publishers in the French capital, but he established his credentials quickly by issuing his own highly regarded printer's manual, Traité élémentaire de l'imprimerie, ou le manuel de l'imprimeur (1793). The outbreak of the Revolution and the declaration of the freedom of the press in August 1789 massively boosted his output and would change his destiny.

An open opponent of even a constitutional monarchy and of the Roman Catholic religion, Momoro keenly threw himself into the revolutionary cause and put his abilities at the service of the new ideas. At the start of the Revolution he bought up several presses, opened a press at 171 rue de la Harpe and launched himself into politics. His initial output remained cautious however, as shown by his refusal, in June 1789, to be the first publisher of La France Libre by Camille Desmoulins. He won the exclusive concession to typography and printing from the Paris Commune and became secretary to the Société des droits de l'homme, which later became the Club des Cordeliers, whose journal he published as well as becoming one of its loudest orators.

Momoro was also among the signatories of the anti-monarchical petition which led to the Champ de Mars massacre, an event that would end in formalizing the split between the moderates and extremists. In the wake of this affair, which led to his imprisonment until September 1791, Momoro resumed his printing activities under his self-given title of "first printer of the national liberty", publishing Jacques-René Hébert's radical newspaper, Le Père Duchesne.

=== Radicalization ===
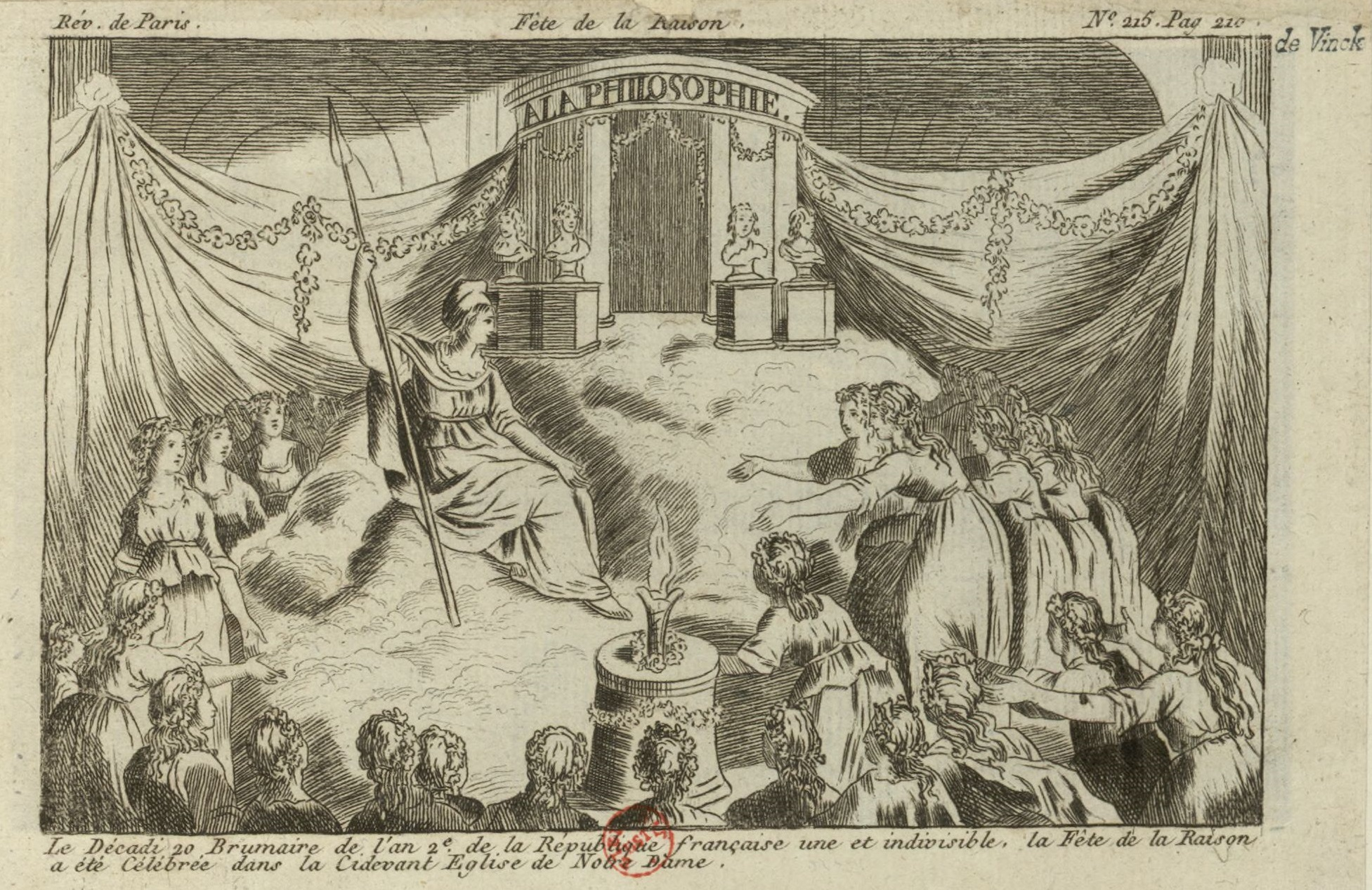
Fête de la Raison à Notre-Dame (Etching, 1793, Paris, BNF, Estampes)

A member of the section du Théâtre-Français, in June 1792 he, Danton and Chaumette wrote and signed a declaration which suppressed the distinction between passive and active citizens in the section. He then took an active part in the insurrection of 10 August 1792. He more and more supported the enragés more than the more moderate indulgents. He was elected by the section to the Directoire du département de Paris and it was then that he and mayor Pache inscribed the motto Unité, Indivisibilité de la République; Liberté, Egalité, Fraternité ou la mort on the façades of all public buildings. After a recruiting mission in Calvados and Eure, he returned to Paris where he was made president of the section du Théâtre-Français.

He took an active part in dechristianisation and was a principal proponent of the Cult of Reason. It was his wife, Sophie Momoro (née Fournier), who played the part of the Goddess at the "Festival of Reason" on 20 Brumaire, Year II (10 November 1793).

He was sent into the Vendée in May 1793, where he acted as deputy to Charles-Philippe Ronsin at the siege of the état-major at Saumur, in a mission to ensure the army fighting against the revolt there was well supplied. On his return to Paris, in a long Rapport sur la politique de la Vendée fait au comité de Salut Public, he explained the reasons for setbacks to Ronsin's strategy in the Vendée and defended General Rossignol, contributing to his rehabilitation.

When Marat was assassinated on 13 July 1793 by Charlotte Corday, Momoro aspired to succeed him as champion of the people and their cause. He persuaded the Cordeliers to go ahead with the publication of the L'Ami du Peuple at his press.

=== Fall ===
After working for the fall of the Girondists in the struggle between the commune and the convention, he participated in attacks on Danton, Robespierre (whom he accused of modérantisme), and the Committee of Public Safety. Pushed onwards by a report by Saint-Just to the Convention denouncing the "complot de l'étranger" woven by the Indulgents and Exagérés, the committee decided on the arrest of the Hébertistes on 13 March 1794. The Revolutionary Tribunal condemned Momoro to death, and he loudly replied "You accuse me, who has given everything for the Revolution!" He was guillotined with Hébert, Ronsin, Vincent and other leading Hébertistes (Cloots, Jean Conrad de Kock) the following afternoon, 4 Germinal, Year II (24 March 1794). Their death of was a sort of carnival, a pleasant spectacle according to Michelet's witnesses.

== Bibliography ==
- 1796 - Traité élémentaire de l'imprimerie, ou le manuel de l'imprimeur; avec 36 planches en tailledouce. Paris, Chez veuve Tilliard & fils

== Sources ==
- Dictionnaire des rues (in French)
- Antoine-François MOMORO (1756-1794) (in French)
- The New World of the Printed Word, 1789–1799
- Texte du citoyen Nicolas Leblanc (in French)
- Lavallée, T. Histoire de Paris depuis le temps des Gaulois jusqu'à nos jours - I (in French)
- Le Club des Cordeliers (in French)
