= Hébertists =

1791–1794 radical political group during the French Revolution

Hébertists Hébertistes
- Founder: Jacques Hébert
- Founded: 1791; 235 years ago
- Dissolved: 1794; 232 years ago
- Headquarters: Paris
- Newspaper: Le Père Duchesne
- Ideology: Jacobinism; State atheism Radicalism; Populism; Anti-clericalism; Revolutionary terrorism
- Political position: Far-left
- National affiliation: Cordeliers
- Colours

The Hébertists (French: Hébertistes, [e.bɛʁ.tist]), or Exaggerators (French: Exagérés), were a radical revolutionary political group associated with the populist journalist Jacques Hébert, a member of the Cordeliers club. They came to power during the Reign of Terror and played a significant role in the French Revolution.

The Hébertists were ardent supporters of the dechristianization of France and of extreme measures in service of the Terror, including the Law of Suspects enacted in 1793. They favoured the direct intervention of the state in economic matters in order to ensure the adequate supply of commodities, advocating the national requisition of wine and grain.

The leaders went to the guillotine on 24 March 1794.

== Rise to popularity ==
The rise in power of the Hébertists can be largely attributed to the popularity of Hébert's newspaper, Le Père Duchesne. This newspaper, which purported to present the frank opinions of Père Duchesne, a fictional working-class furnace-maker, had a large following amongst the sans-culottes. The government-funded distribution of Le Père Duchesne to the French armies, a policy arranged by the Hébertist Minister of War Jean Baptiste Noël Bouchotte in 1793, widened support and sympathy for Hébertist ideas.

On 24 May 1793, the newly appointed Commission of Twelve ordered the arrest of Hébert, who had been using Le Père Duchesne to incite violence against members of the Girondin faction. The tremendous public outcry and civil unrest which ensued rapidly resulted in Hébert's release. However, rioting continued, culminating in a series of insurrections. On 31 May 1793, a large crowd of sans-culotte agitators surrounded the National Convention in an attempt to force its accession to their demands, namely the dissolution of the Commission of Twelve, the arrest of a list of Girondin deputies, a tax on the rich and the restriction of suffrage to sans-culottes. The Commission was abolished, but on 2 June 1793 the crowds—now supported by National Guard forces headed by Hébertist and newly appointed Commandant-General François Hanriot—returned. Hanriot threatened to set fire to the Convention if the offending Girondin deputies were not expelled. Ultimately, the arrest of twenty-nine Girondins was decreed, marking the end of the Girondin faction's political power.

Following the assassination of Jean-Paul Marat by a Girondin sympathizer in July 1793, Hébert positioned himself as Marat's natural successor in the affections of those who had shared the dead man's ultra-revolutionary beliefs. The Hébertists' popularity grew. Their evident and increasingly destabilizing influence was disturbing to many less extreme revolutionary politicians, including leading Montagnard figures such as Georges Danton and Maximilien Robespierre—the latter of whom especially disapproved of the Hébertists' atheism.

== Accusations and denunciation ==
Over the course of October 1793, a number of accusations were leveled against prominent Hébertists by Fabre d'Églantine, a friend and supporter of Danton. Fabre claimed to have discovered a foreign plot in which Stanislas-Marie Maillard and Anacharsis Cloots, among others, were implicated as agents. This succeeded in casting suspicion on the Hébertist faction. However, Fabre himself was rapidly revealed to have been acting in part as part of an elaborate attempt to conceal his own involvement in a scandal surrounding the liquidation of the French East India Company and his credibility was thereby diminished.

In December 1793, the journalist Camille Desmoulins—whose political opinions had long been aligned with those of Danton and Robespierre—began publishing a journal, Le Vieux Cordelier, aimed in part at the discrediting of the Hébertist faction. The journal's title alluded to the fact that the Cordeliers Club, formerly a moderate revolutionary society dominated by the policies of Danton, had become overrun by sans-culotte Hébertists and their sympathizers. Desmoulins attacked Hébert for bringing the French Republic into disrepute through his writings, claiming that "when the tyrants of Europe wish[ed] to vilify the Republic, to make their slaves believe that France is covered with the darkness of barbarism, that Paris [...] is peopled with Vandals", they reprinted Le Père Duchesne. He also mocked Hébert for having pretended to be a "man of the people" and a representative of the sans-culottes—when in fact he had profited handsomely from the contracts his follower Bouchotte had secured to distribute Le Père Duchesne to the armies. In turn, Hébert accused Desmoulins of hypocrisy, pointing out that his current opposition to violence and extremism (in addition to attacking ultra-revolutionary excesses, Desmoulins had called for an end to the Terror) stood in sharp contrast to his support for such tactics in a 1789 pamphlet, Discours de la lanterne aux Parisiens, which had advocated the execution of those opposed to revolution. The vitriolic exchange continued throughout the winter of 1793–1794, ultimately contributing to the downfall of both Desmoulins and Hébert.

== Fall from power ==
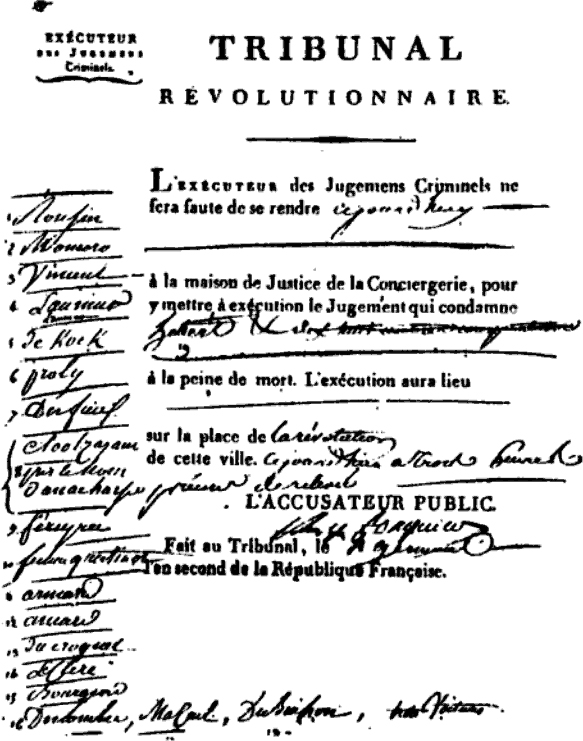
Order of execution for the Hébertists published by the Revolutionary Tribunal and signed by the hand of Antoine Quentin Fouquier-Tinville

Following the February 1794 recall of Hébertist deputy Jean-Baptiste Carrier from Nantes, where he had been engaged in mass executions to suppress the Vendéen revolts, the Hébertists attempted to stage a popular revolt, hoping to mimic that which had led to the downfall of the Girondins. On 4 March 1794, Carrier and Hébert veiled the bust of Liberty at the Cordeliers Club, declaring according to ritual a state of insurrection. They had hoped to demand that the National Convention expel Robespierre and his Montagnard supporters. However, the city of Paris did not rise and the Paris Commune failed to provide military support for the coup.

The Hébertists were denounced by Louis Antoine de Saint-Just and Robespierre, and the leaders of the faction were arrested on 13 March 1794. Some twenty of them, including Anacharsis Cloots, Pierre-Ulric Dubuisson, Jean-Baptiste-Joseph Gobel, Jean Conrad de Kock, Antoine-François Momoro, Charles-Philippe Ronsin, François-Nicolas Vincent and Hébert himself were tried before the Revolutionary Tribunal and convicted on 24 March 1794. They went to the guillotine that same evening. Pierre Gaspard Chaumette followed a few days later, followed by Hébert's widow Marie Marguerite Françoise Hébert.

Other Hébertists, including Joseph Le Bon, Jean-Baptiste Carrier, François Chabot and François Hanriot, were to also fall victim to the guillotine on various dates in 1794 and 1795.

== Notable Hébertists ==
- Jacques-Claude Bernard
- Joseph Le Bon
- Jean Baptiste Noël Bouchotte
- Jean-Baptiste Carrier
- François Chabot
- Pierre Gaspard Chaumette
- Anacharsis Cloots
- Pierre-Ulric Dubuisson
- Jean-Baptiste-Joseph Gobel
- François Hanriot
- Jacques Hébert
- Jean Conrad de Kock
- Stanislas-Marie Maillard
- Jean-Paul Marat (supporter)
- Antoine-François Momoro
- Jacob Pereira
- Charles-Philippe Ronsin
- François-Nicolas Vincent

== Gallery ==
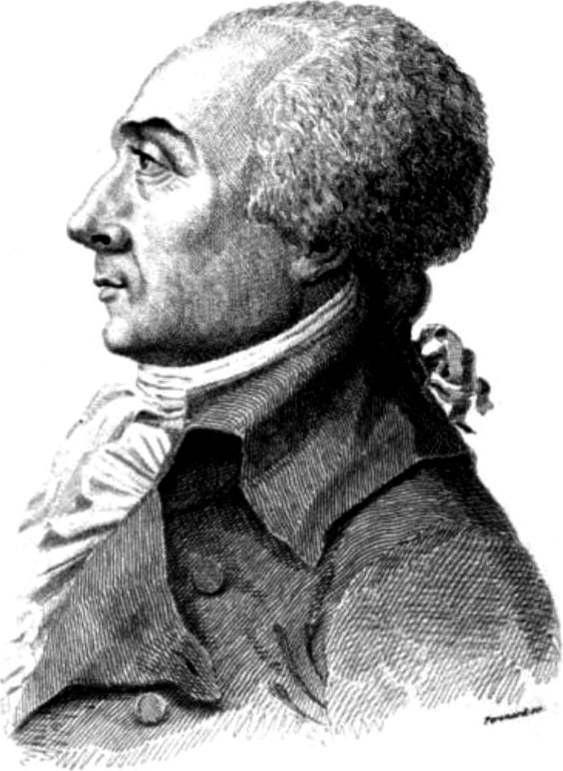
Jacques Hébert

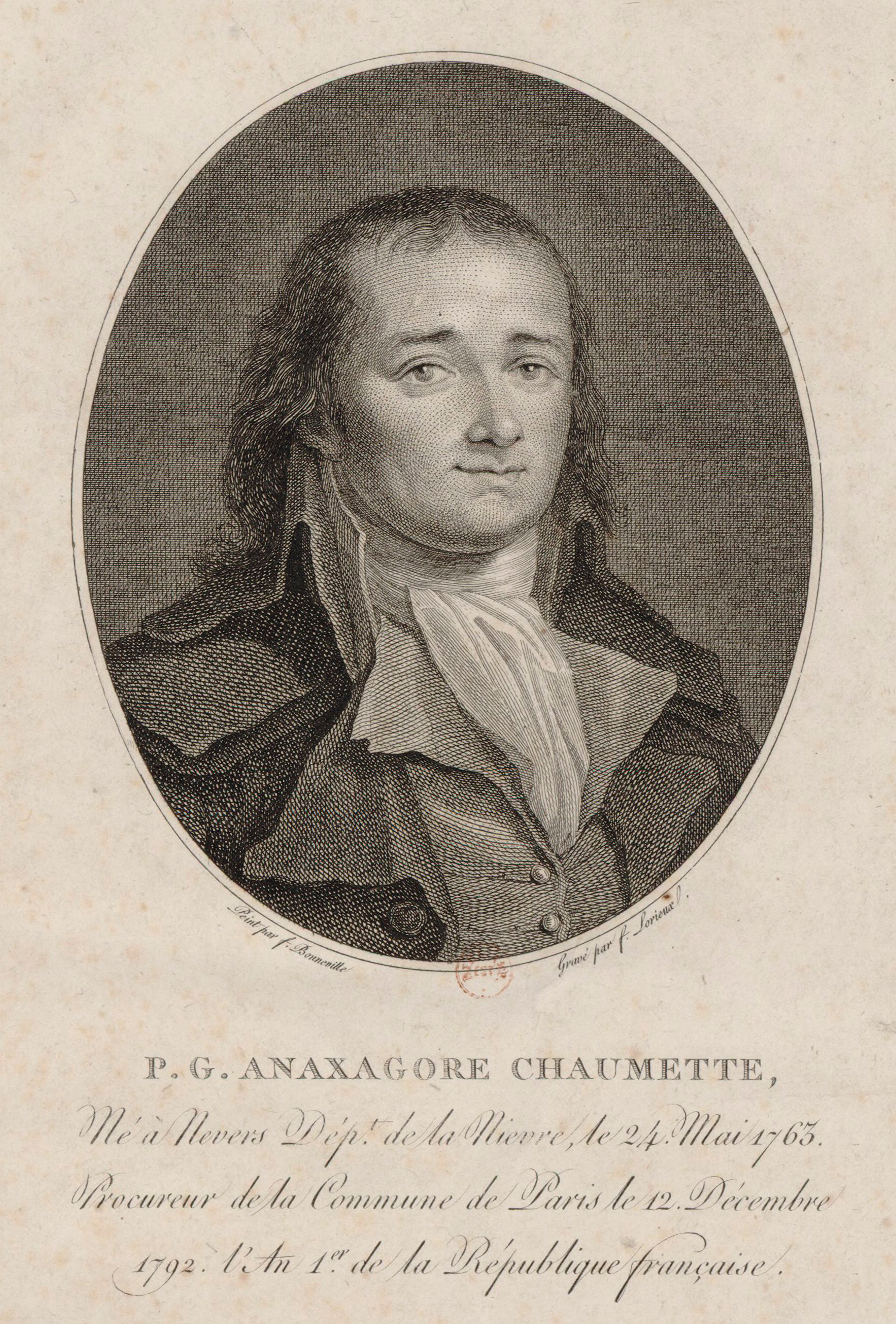
Pierre-Gaspard Chaumette

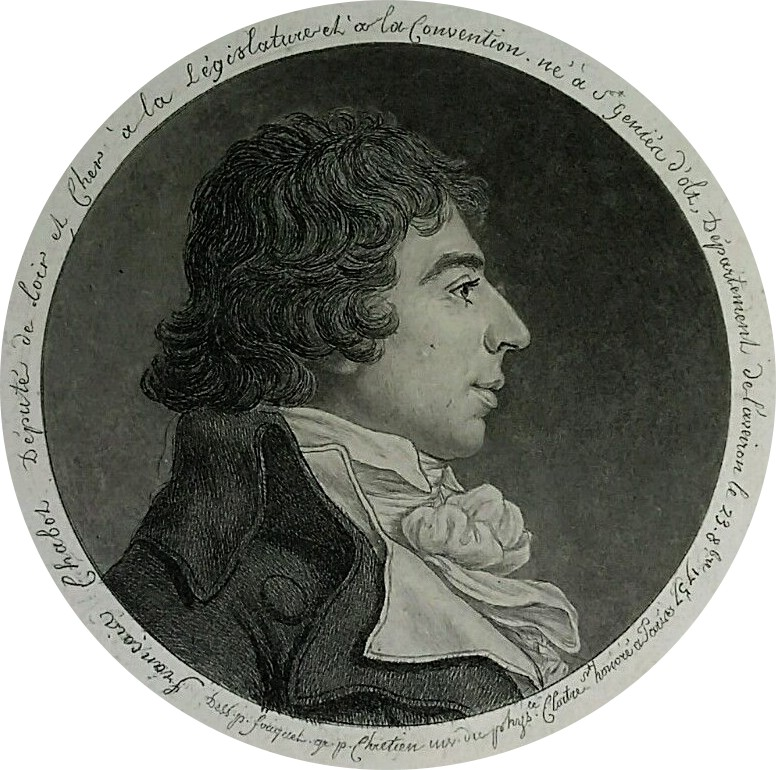
François Chabot

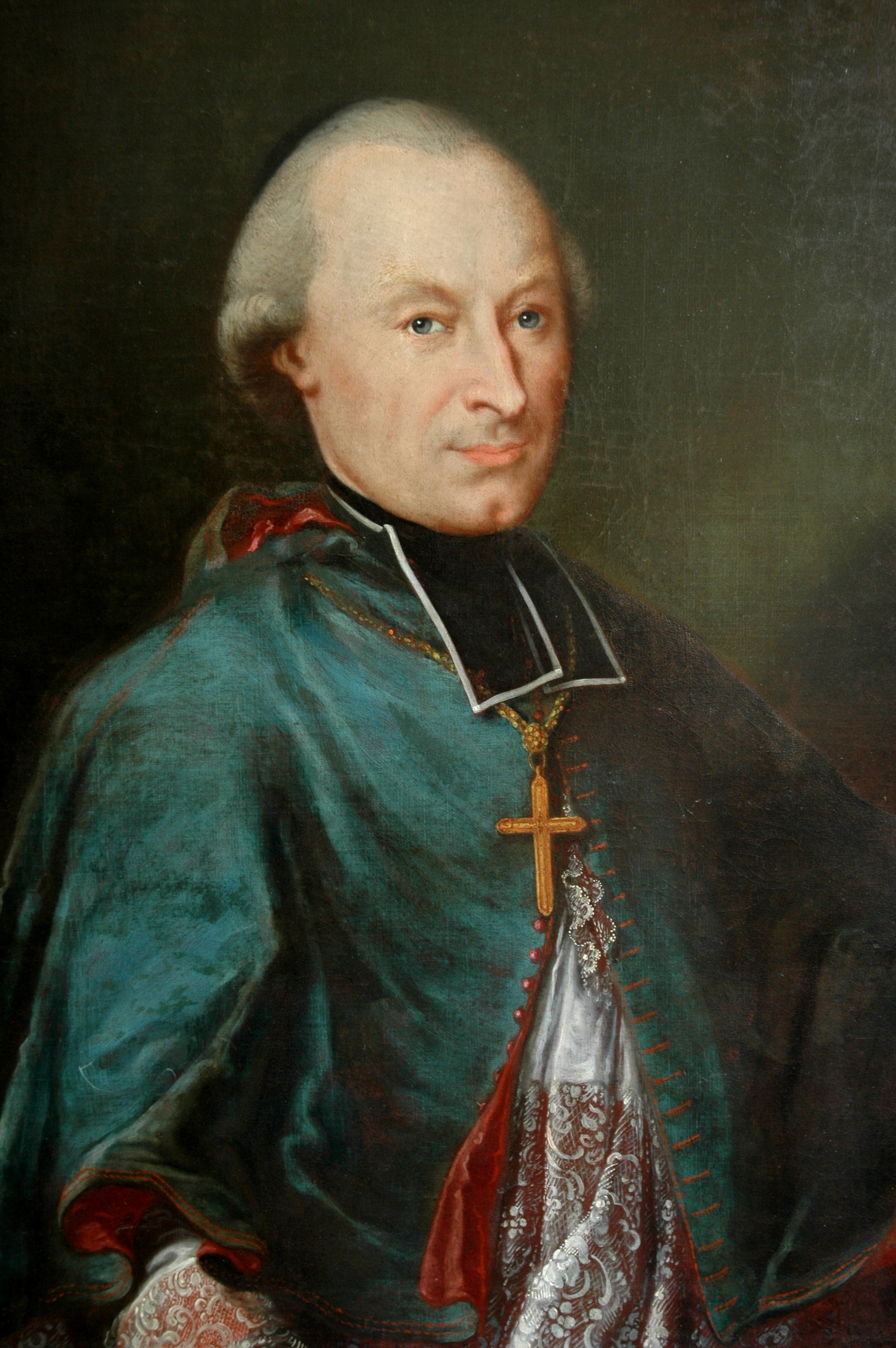
Jean-Baptiste-Joseph Gobel

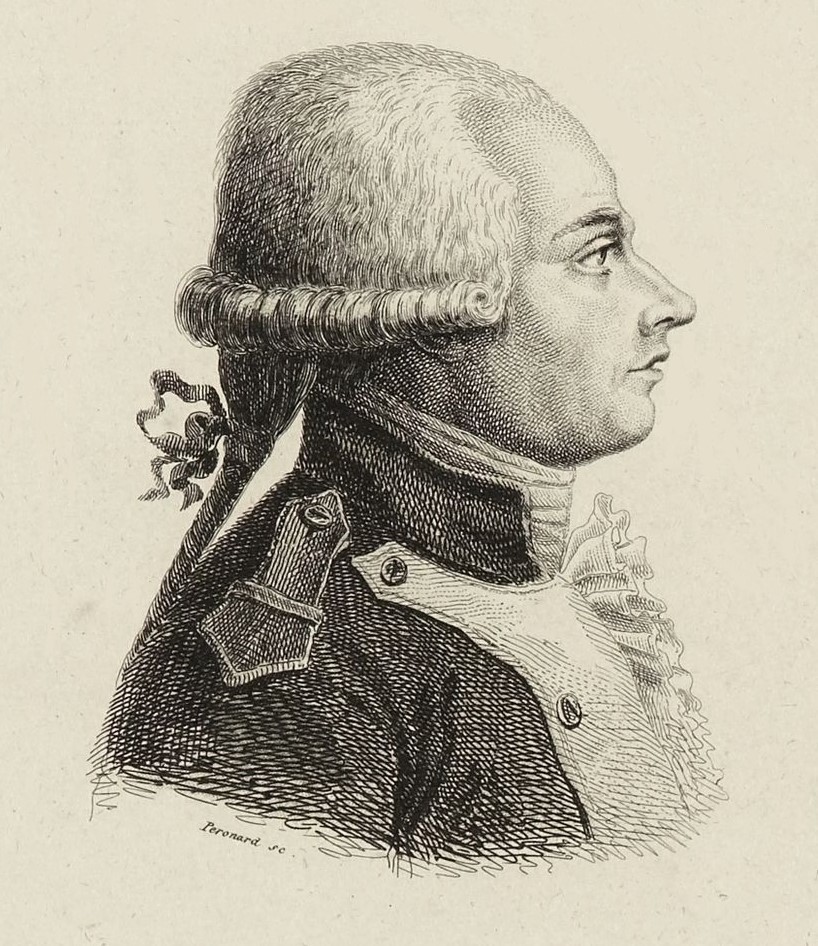
Antoine-François Momoro
