= Charles Paul de Kock =

French novelist

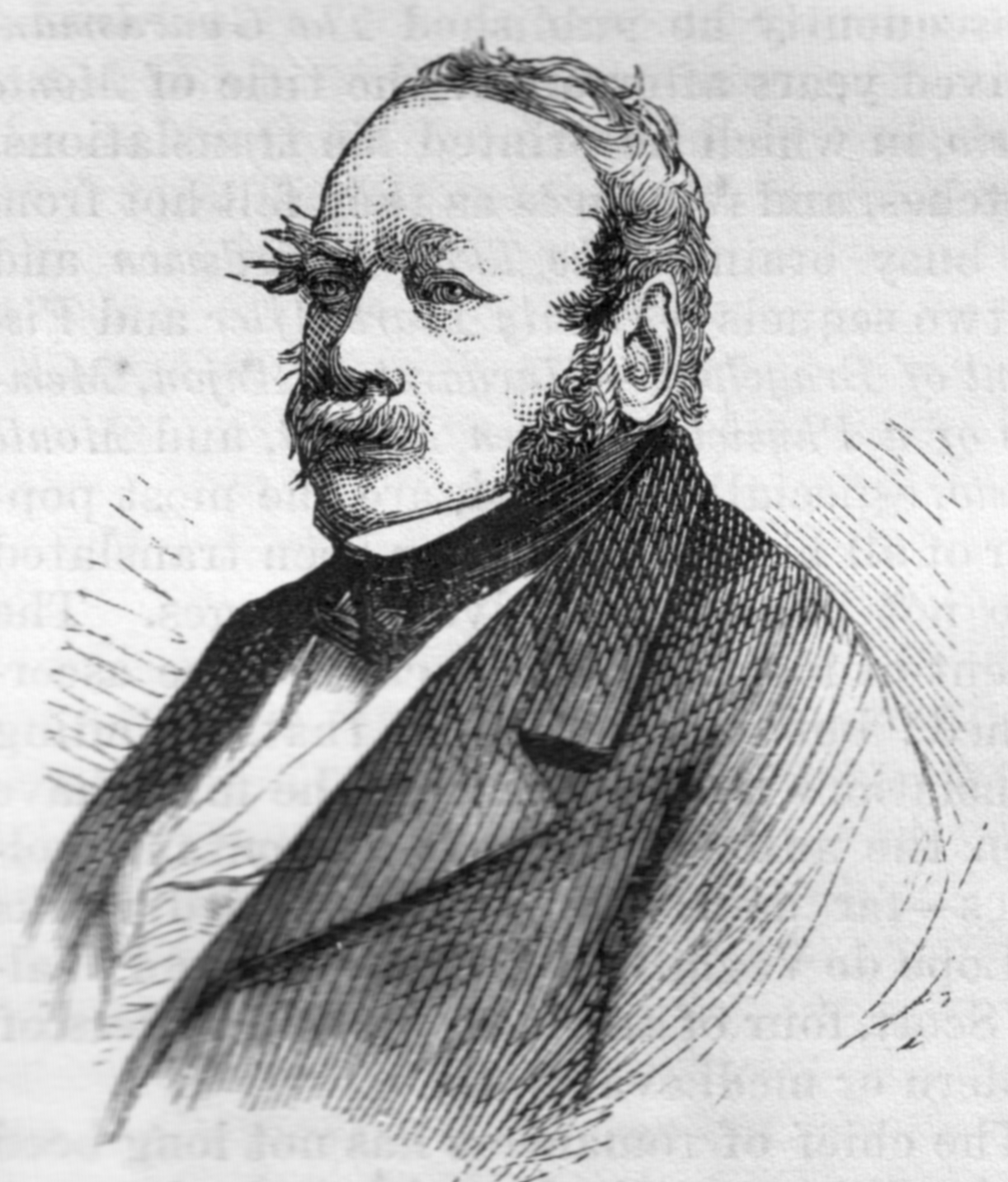
An engraving of de Kock from 1873.

Charles Paul de Kock (May 21, 1793 in Passy, Paris – April 27, 1871 in Paris) was a French novelist. Although one of the most popular and beloved writers of his day, especially in terms of book sales, he acquired a literary reputation among critics for being low-brow and in poor taste. In 2021 Brad Bigelow wrote: "Today, if we set aside over-priced print on demand reprints of his ancient editions, the works of Paul de Kock haven't seen a new English edition (or translation) in at least a century."

== Biography ==
His father, Jean Conrad de Kock, a banker of Dutch extraction, was guillotined in Paris 24 March 1794, a victim of the Reign of Terror. His mother, Anne-Marie Perret, née Kirsberger, was a widow from Basel.

Paul de Kock began life as a banker's clerk. For the most part he resided on the Boulevard St. Martin in Paris, where he was born and lived out his life, rarely leaving the city.

He began to write for the stage very early and composed many operatic libretti. His first novel, L'Enfant de ma femme (1811), was published at his own expense when he was 18 years old. In 1820 he began his long and successful series of novels dealing with Parisian life with Georgette, ou la Nièce du tabellion. He was most prolific and successful during the Restoration and the early days of Louis Philippe.

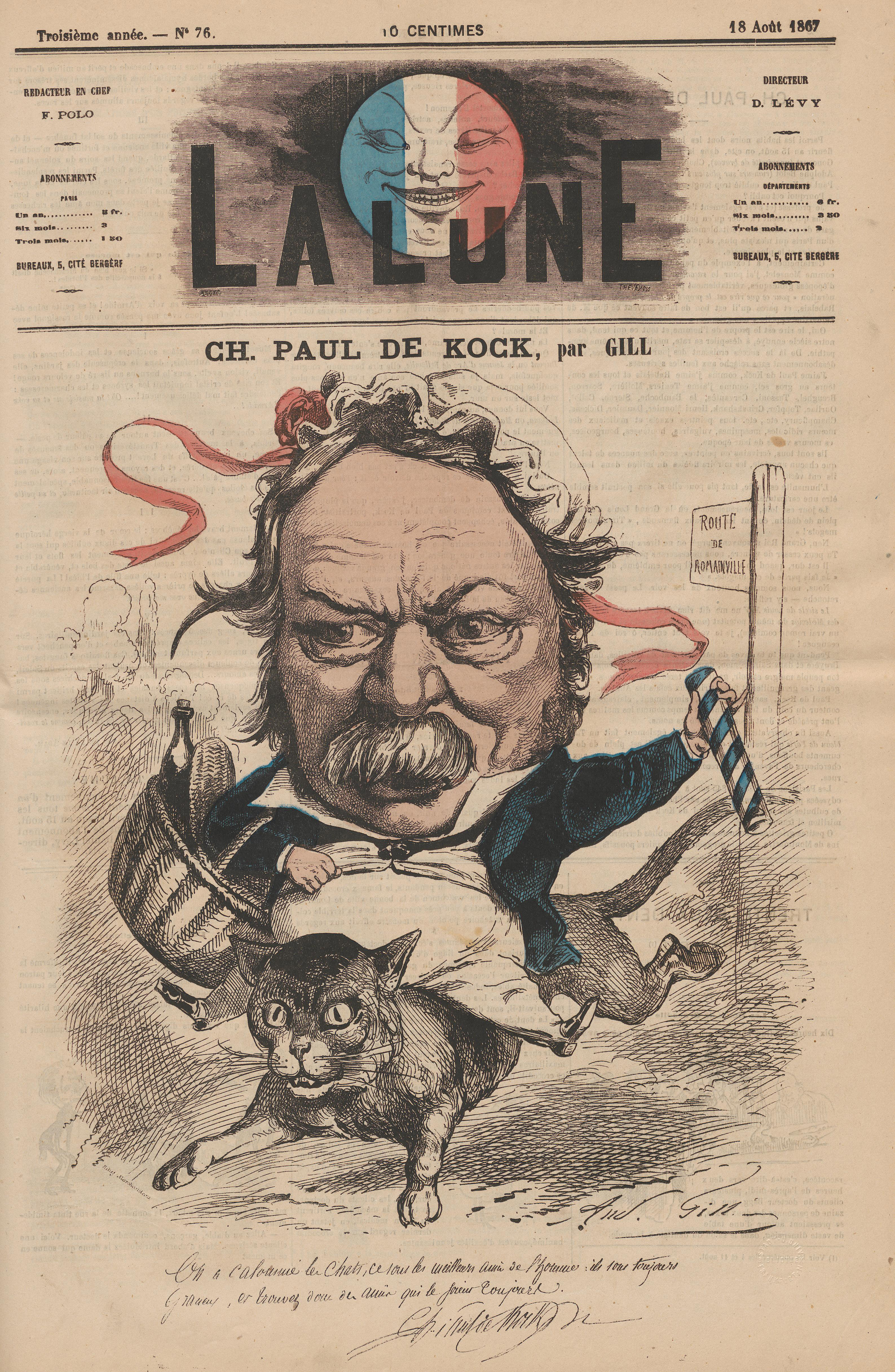
Caricature of de Kock, André Gill, 1867.

== Literary reputation ==
By 1830, de Kock was one of the most popular authors in Europe. His books typically sold 2–3,000 copies, while Balzac, George Sand, and Eugène Sue were fortunate to sell more than 1,000 of theirs.

According to Théophile Gautier, "There never was an author more popular in the real meaning of the word. He was read by everybody, by the statesman as well as by the commercial traveller and the schoolboy, by the great ladies in society and by the grisettes." According to William Thackeray, in 1841, "The French writer whose works are best known in England is Monsieur Paul de Kock." But, he cautioned, "Talk to a French educated gentleman about this author, and he shrugs his shoulders, and says it is pitoyable."

One of the characters in Dostoevsky's novel Poor Folk (1846) wrote that reading a novel by de Kock was not becoming for ladies. In The Idiot, Aglaya Ivanovna declares that she "read a couple of Paul de Kok’s [sic] novels two years since on purpose, so as to know all about everything." James Joyce's Ulysses includes references to de Kock; Joyce plays with his name for bawdy humor in the Calypso, Sirens and Circe episodes, the last of which also specifically mentions de Kock's novel The Girl with the Three Pairs of Stays. In Thackeray's Pendennis, the title character of the book remarks that he had read nothing of the "novel kind" for thirty years, except Paul de Kock, who certainly made him laugh. The 1920 Encyclopedia Americana attributes his popularity abroad to his style, which it describes as his "worst feature . . . barely presentable, a fault evidently due to deficiency of education. . . . the defects of style disappear in translation."

The 1905 New International Encyclopædia describes his stories as "rather vulgar, but not immoral, demanding no literary training and gratifying no delicate taste". By this time he was seldom mentioned in the more conventional French histories of French literature.

Anne O'Neil-Henry, a modern academic who has taken an interest in de Kock, calls him "the July Monarchy's bourgeois writer par excellence," but that "by the 1830s his name carried a specific connotation: 'Paul de Kock' signified 'bad' literature, a sort of … marker of poor taste." However, she clarifies, "while critics around 1830 began to use his name synonymously with lowbrow literature, many of their reviews evinced an appreciation of some elements of his work and recognition of his successful command of the taste of modern readers. Simply put, 'Paul de Kock' did not always signify 'Paul de Kock'."

== Works ==
Paul de Kock wrote about 100 volumes. With the exception of a few excursions into historical romance and some miscellaneous works of which his share in La Grande yule, Paris (1842), is the chief, they are all stories of middle-class Parisian life, of guinguettes and cabarets and equivocal adventures of one sort or another. The most famous are André le Savoyard (1825) and Le Barbier de Paris (1826). The stories are full of observation at first hand and of spicy humor.

Typical examples of his work are:

- Gustave le mauvais sujet (1821)
- Frère Jacques (1822)
- La laitière de Montfermeil (1827)
- Monsieur Dupont (1825)
- Un Tourlouron (1837)
- La femme, le mari et l'amant (1829)
- Le cocu (1831)
- La pucelle de Belleville (1834)

A 56-volume edition of his works came out in 1884. He has had imitators, among them his son Henri (1819–92).
