= Jean Conrad de Kock =

Dutch lawyer, banker and Dutch republican

Jean Conrad de Kock (26 January 1755 – 24 March 1794) (born Johannes Conradus de Kock) was a Dutch lawyer, banker and Dutch republican. He was born in Heusden in the Low Countries and guillotined in Paris on 4 Germinal, Year II (24 March 1794).

De Kock was born the son of Govert Kock, mayor of Heusden and studied law to become a lawyer, developing republican principles. In 1787 he fled, with 40,000 of the free militia, when the Prussian army occupied Amsterdam at the request of Wilhemine, the stadtholder's wife and became a refugee in France with his wife, Marie-Pétronille Merkus, and two sons. Three daughters were left with a sister. When his wife died in 1789 he married a rich widow, Anna Maria Kirsberger, with whom in 1793 he had a further son, the novelist Charles Paul de Kock.

He joined the Sartorius-Shokard Bank and progressed to become Commissioner for Low Country Affairs. Still upholding his republican ideals he founded the "Comité Révolutionnaire Batave" which formed and sent to the Dutch Republic a force of volunteers under General Daendels. The force was intended to assist General Dumouriez in freeing the Low Countries from Austrian rule but Dumouriez subsequently defected from the Revolutionary government to support King Louis XVI.

When the French Revolution began in 1792 de Kock expressed his backing for the planned assassination of King Louis. In 1793 he met the revolutionary Jacques René Hébert and the two became good friends. He also associated with fellow Hébertist revolutionaries Anacharsis Cloots and Charles-Philippe Ronsin.

In March 1794, having by now left the bank, he was accused by the Committee of Public Safety (the provisional government in France during the Reign of Terror), of being an agent for the British. He was arrested at his home on March 18 and taken to the Conciergerie where the public prosecutor Fouquier-Tinville charged him with having had meetings against the government and of having been the friend of the traitor Dumouriez. He appeared in court on March 24 in company with Jacques Hébert and his Hébertist followers and was sentenced to death along with some 20 others. They were all guillotined that same evening. Their death of was a sort of carnival, a pleasant spectacle according to Michelet's witnesses.

His eldest son Hendrik Merkus de Kock (1779 in Heusden–1845) became a Dutch general in the Batavian Navy and Lieutenant Governor-General of the Dutch East Indies. He was made a baron.
