= Roland Mortier =

Belgian scholar, philosopher, and academic

Roland Mortier (21 December 1920 – 31 March 2015) was a prominent Belgian scholar, philosopher and academic, known for his contributions to linguistics and literature. Mortier obtained his PhD in Philology, specialisting in 18th century literature and Franco-German reports, from the Université libre de Bruxelles in 1946. He was a member of the Académie royale de langue et de littérature françaises de Belgique and the Académie des Sciences Morales et Politiques. In 1965, he was awarded the Francqui Prize in Human Sciences.

== Background ==
Mortier was born on 21 December 1920 in Ghent, Belgium. His family spoke primarily French, and he studied in Dutch at the Royal Athenaeum in Antwerp. Mortier extended his language skills further, learning German, when holidaying with his maternal grandmother in Luxembourg.

In 1938, he enrolled at the Université libre de Bruxelles. However, in November 1941, the institution was forced to close its doors due to the occupier's ukase. Mortier then chose to attend a university in his hometown, Gent. In 1942, he successfully completed his degree in philosophy and literature, graduating with the highest distinction.

His dissertation was on the Archives littéraires de l'Europe, a German-language journal of the First Empire. This work was later published in 1957. On the advice of his teacher Gustave Charlier, Mortier was struck by the fact that one of the editors of the journal, Charles Vanderbourg, had been unjustly forgotten. Mortier dedicated his doctoral thesis, which was defended in 1950 at the Université libre de Bruxelles, to Vanderbourg. The thesis was published in 1955 and titles Un précurseur de Madame de Staël: Charles Vanderbourg (1765-1827).

In addition to his teaching careers at Athénée Royal de Malines from 1944 and his assistantship at the University of Brussels, Mortier also participated in a research project headed by Charlier. The project, which was published in 1952, focused on the Journal Encyclopédique and its role in popularising the ideas of Diderot and d'Alembert's Encyclopédie. Mortier went on to succeed Charlier and took a tenure as a professor at the University of Brussels. Four years later, Mortier wrote a groundbreaking dissertation on Diderot's influence on German thought and literature, which was later published as Diderot en Allemagne (1750-1850). This work was recognised as a fundamental and influential contribution to the field and was translated to German in 1967, with an updated edition released in 1986.

In 1965, Mortier's outstanding work was recognised by the Fondation Francqui as they awarded him with their triennial prize.

Throughout his career, Mortier taught at various universities including the Université libre de Bruxelles, the Katholieke Universiteir Leuven, and the Université de Liège. He was also invited to be a visiting professor at universities in Canada (including Toronto), the United States (including Yale, Princeton, Standford, Cleveland, Maryland), the United Kingdom (including Exeter and London), Paris-Sorbonne, Montpellier, Cologne, Pisa, Duisburg, and Japan.

On March 31, 2015, Mortier died at the age of 94 in Brüssel.

== Awards and Memberships ==
In recognition of his contributions to academia, Mortier received numerous honours and awards, including the Francqui Prize, the highest scientific award in Belgium. He was a member of several prestigious academic organisations including the Royal Academy of Flemish Language and Literature.

=== Awards ===
Francqui Prize (1965)

Prix Montaigne (1983)

Prix Counson of the Académie royale de langue et littérature françaises de Bruxelles (1985)

Prix de l'Union rationaliste (1992)

Prix du Rayonnement de la langue et de la littéeature françaises (2001)

Grand Prix de la Francophonie (2006)

=== Memberships ===
Académie royale de langue et de littérature françaises (1969)

Foreign member of the Academy of Sciences of the GDR (1971–1992)

President of l'Association Internationale de littérature comparée (1976–1979)

Member and Honorary President of l'Association Internationale des Études Françaises (1976)

President of the Société internationale d'étude du XVIIIe siècle (1983–1987)

Corresponding Fellow of the British Academy (1984)

President of the Comité d'honneur des Études staëliennes

Member of the Comité directeur des Œuvres complètes de Diderot

Member of the Conseil consultatif des Œuvres complètes de Voltaire

Foreign associate of the Académie des Sciences morales et politiques (1993)

Honorary member of the Hungarian Academy of Sciences

Member of the Academia Europaea

Professor Emeritus of the University of Brussels

Vice-President of the Institut des hautes études de Belgique

President of the Honorary Committee of Stalinist Studies (Paris)

Honorary Member of The Japan Academy (2012)

=== Honorary Doctorates ===
He held honorary doctorates from the Universities of Montpellier, Göttingen and Jerusalem.

== Works ==
In addition to his linguistic research, Mortier was a well-respected literary critic and author. He wrote extensively - the result of fifty years of teaching and research concluded in publication of Le Coeur et la raison (The Heart and Reason), in 1990, by the Voltaire Foundation in Oxford. The publication brought together thirty-five of the two hundred and thirty articles Mortier published by that time. In 2006 a further book was published, presenting twenty-four texts written by Mortier on the subject of the Enlightenment, to mark his eightieth anniversary. The publication was entitled Les Combats des Lumières: Recueil d'études sur le dix-huitième siècle.

=== Written works ===
- Le journal encyclopédique, 1756-1793. (1952)
- Diderot en Allemagne: 1950-1850. (1954)
- Un precursor de Madame de Staël: Charles Vanderbourg (1765-1827). His contribution to intellectual exchanges at the dawn of the 19th century. (published Doctoral Thesis 1955)
- Les Archives Litteraires de L'Europe.
- Le "Hochepot, ou, Salmigondi des Folz" (1596): étude historique et linguistique suivie d'une édition du texte. (1959)
- Unité ou scission du siècle des lumières?, Studies on Voltaire and the Eighteenth Century. (1963)
- Les Annees De Formation De F.H.Jacobi, D'Apres Ses Lettres Indedites a M.M. Rey (1763-1771) Avec Le Noble, De Madame De Charriere (ST). (1966)
- Diderot in Deutschland, 1750-1850. (1967)
- Clartés et Ombres du siècle des Lumières: Études sur le 18e siècle littéraire. (1969)
- Le "Tableau littéraire de la France au XVIIIe siècle": un épisode de la "guerre philosophique" à l'Académie française sous l'Empire 1804-1810. (1972)
- La Poétique des ruines en France : ses origines, ses variations, de la Renaissance à Victor Hugo. (1974)
- Histoire de la littérature française: la poésie : notes prises au cours du professeur R. Mortier. (1977)
- Voltaire: les ruses et les rages du pamphlétaire. (1979)
- L' Art nouveau: littérature et beaux-arts à la fin du 19e s. (1981)
- Diderot et le grand goût : the prestige of history painting in the 18th century. (1982)
- L'Originalité: une nouvelle catégorie esthétique au siècle des Lumières. (1982)
- Diderot et son temps (catalogue d'exposition). (1985)
- Denis Diderot, Le Pour et le Contre. (1987)
- Mes écarts. (1990)
- Le Coeur et la raison. (1990)
- Schnittpunkte: komparatistische Studien zur romanischen Kultur : gewidmet Peter-Eckhard Knabe. (1994)
- Contes immoraux. (1995)
- Un précurseur de Madame de Stäel: Charles Vanderbourg, 1765-1827; sa contribution aux échanges intellectuels à l'aube de XIXe siècle. (1995)
- Anacharsis Cloots, ou, L'utopie foudroyée. (1995)
- Denis Diderot, Pensées philosophiques. (1998)
- Dictionnaire de Diderot. (1999)
- Les combats des Lumières: recueil d'études sur le dix-huitième siècle. (2000)
- Portraits de femmes. (2000)
- Le XVIIIe siècle au quotidien .(2001)
- L'aube de la modernité 1680-1760 (2002)
- Juliette de Robersart, une voyageuse belge oubliée. (en: Juliette de Robersart, a forgotten Belgian traveler) (2003)
- Les Combats des Lumières: Recueil d'études sur le dix-huitième siècle. (2006)
