= François-Nicolas Vincent =

French law clerk and revolutionary general

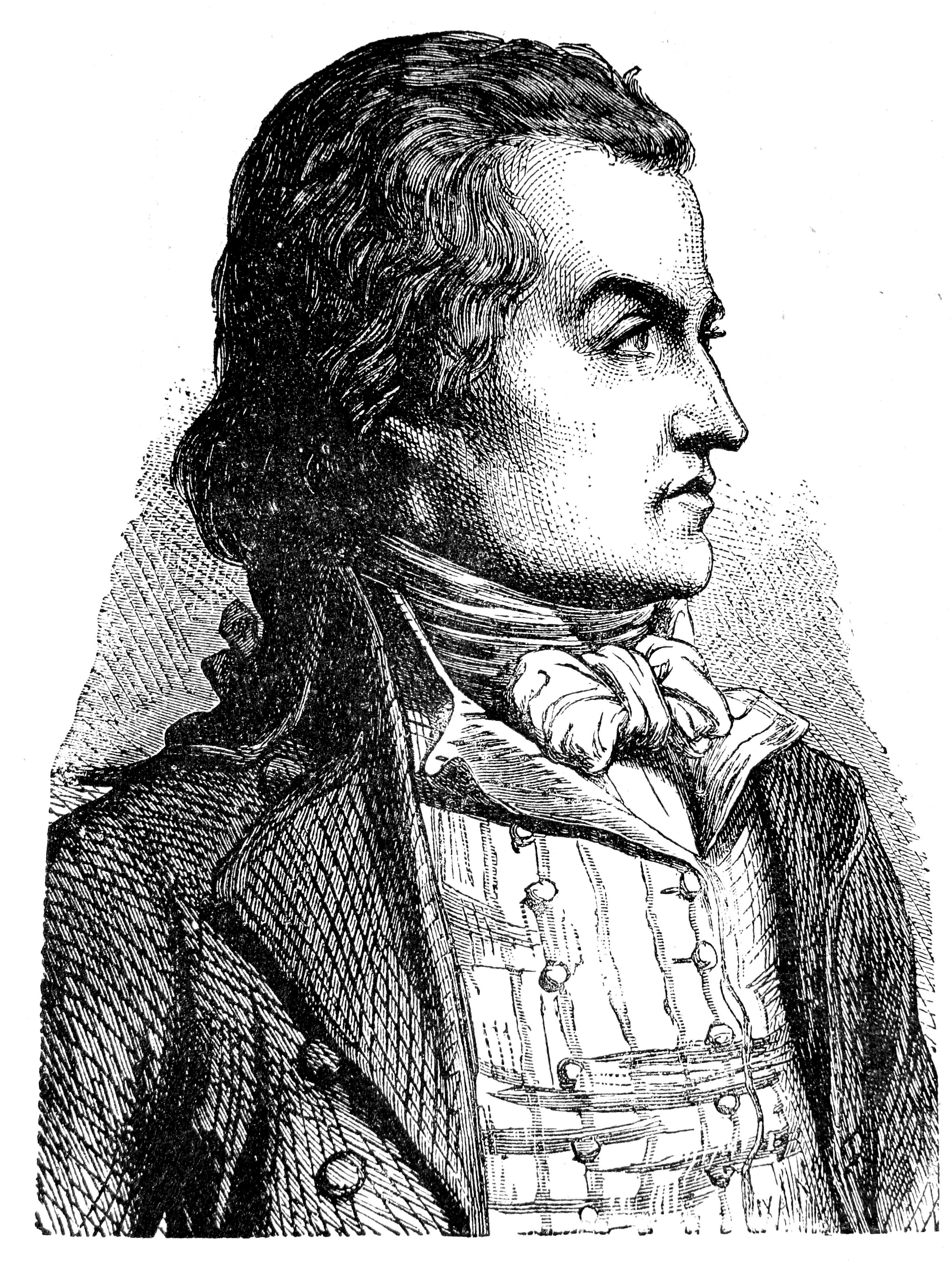
François-Nicolas Vincent

François-Nicolas Vincent (French pronunciation: [fʁɑ̃swa nikɔla vɛ̃sɑ̃]; born 1766 or 1767; died 24 March 1794) was the Secretary General of the War Ministry in the French First Republic, and a significant figure in the French Revolution. A member of the Cordelier Club, he is best known as a radical sans-culottes leader and prominent member of the Hébertist faction.

== Leadership ==
The son of a prison concierge and a native Parisian, Vincent worked as a lawyer's clerk and is believed to have lived in substantial poverty until 1792, at which point he became an active participant in the radical Revolutionary effort. The youngest of the men to follow Jacques Hébert, Vincent, along with fellow Hébertist Charles-Philippe Ronsin, took the Revolution to the country, becoming revolutionaries-on-a-mission. Upon his return to Paris, Vincent became more active in the Cordelier Club and was soon elected Orator. After this advancement, Vincent was eventually made General Secretary of the War Ministry under Jean Baptiste Noël Bouchotte. It is this job that allowed Vincent to bring more power to the sans-culottes.

== Downfall ==
Jacques Hébert, writer and publisher of the La Pere Duchesne, led Vincent, among others, on a campaign against what they deemed the soft 'moderation' of the Committee of Public Safety, along with attempts to aid in the 'de-Christianization' of France. Vincent supported the overthrow of Maximilien Robespierre and when he and his fellow Hébertists became active enough in their opposition, Robespierre reacted with an arrest and trial for 'treasonous activity'. The Hébertists, along with some of their close friends and companions, were charged with attempting to overthrow the Committee of Public Safety to ensure the re-establishment of the monarchy and conspiring with foreigners to take down the Republic. No physical evidence was given to support these allegations but, even so, Vincent and his fellow Hébertists were found guilty and sentenced to death. On 24 March 1794, at the age of twenty-seven, François-Nicolas Vincent was beheaded at the guillotine along with Hébert, Ronsin, Momoro, and the other leaders of the Hébertist faction.
