= Charles-Philippe Ronsin =

French revolutionary general

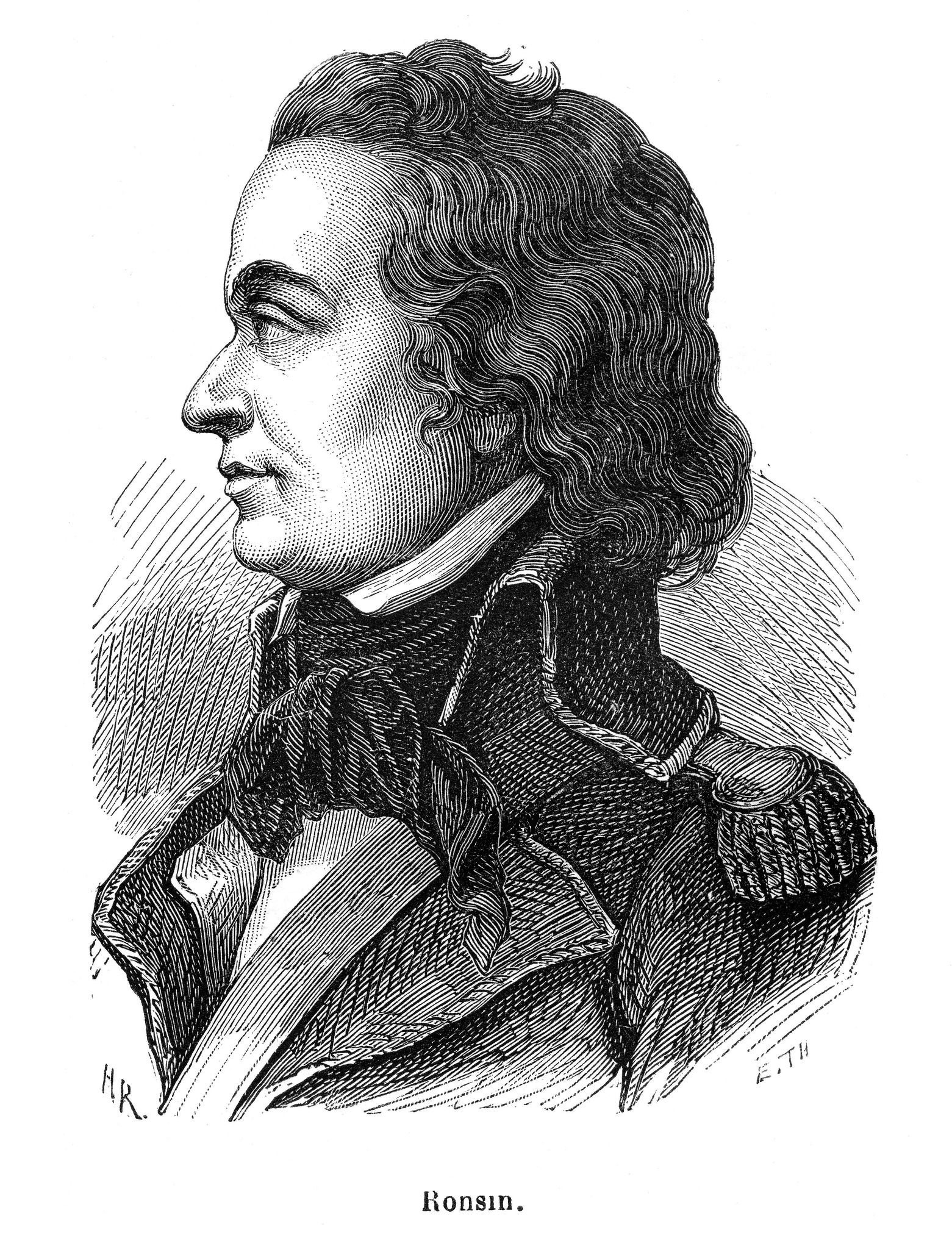
Charles-Philippe Ronsin.

Charles-Philippe Ronsin (French pronunciation: [ʃaʁl filip ʁɔ̃sɛ̃]; 1 December 1751 – 24 March 1794) was a French general of the Revolutionary Army of the French First Republic, commanding the large Parisian division of l'Armée Révolutionnaire. He was an extreme radical leader of the French Revolution, and one of the many followers of Jacques-René Hébert, known as the Hébertists.

== Life ==
Born in 1751 in Soissons, Aisne, a city northeast of Paris, Ronsin was son of a master cooper or barrel maker. At the age of seventeen, Charles-Philippe Ronsin joined the Parisian army. By 1772 he left the army with the position of corporal and soon became a playwright and a tutor. In these years he met the artist Jacques-Louis David and they became good friends.

Welcoming the Revolution, Ronsin became the Bourgeois Guard Captain in the district of Saint-Roch in 1789. He presented several patriotic pieces in some of the theatres in the capital between the years 1790 and 1792. It was in this period that Ronsin became a club orator and joined the club of the Cordeliers.

== Influences ==
In August and September 1792, the Executive Council entrusted him three missions. In November, the minister of war, Pache, named him commissioner-organizer in Belgium to the army of Dumouriez. In this post, Ronsin denounced the acts of violence of the suppliers to the armed forces, who were protected by the general.

Ronsin was named assistant of the minister of war of Bouchotte on 23 April 1793, without ever commanding a squadron. It is possible that Ronsin received that position thanks to his friendship with Chaumette and Hébert. In May, he left to Vendée, to help the provisioning armies. There was an incident in which Ronsin was upset that his plan for defeating the Vendeans was rejected, therefore, he decided to make sure that General Canclaux was defeated by the Vendeans, ensuring his own victory. He led his troops to Vihiers and Beaulieu and was eventually trapped at Coron. Because of Ronsin's decision the Vendeans took over Beaulieu and managed to convince the committee to get rid of Canclaux.

Ronsin's support among the Cordeliers and the ministry allowed him to cross the rank of captain to that of brigadier general in the army of the coasts of Rochelle. In September 1793, he becomes chief general of the revolutionary army of Paris. Ronsin had a violent character and was very outspoken. He, however, proved to be a good leader. Ronsin was witty and clever when dealing with his different functions. However, thanks to his quick ascent and his character Ronsin acquired numerous enemies, particularly Pierre Philippeaux and Fabre d'Eglantine.

Ronsin created a bill that was posted in Paris after his return from Lyon that stated that there were one hundred and forty thousand people living in Lyon, fifteen hundred of which had nothing to do with the rebellions. Ronsin stated that before the end of September, all of the people who were guilty would die. On 17 December Fabre d'Eglantine denounced Ronsin for being an ultra-revolutionist. Ronsin was arrested along with François-Nicolas Vincent, who was another member of the Cordeliers Club.

== Last days ==
While in prison the Cordeliers wrote a petition in favor of both Vincent and Ronsin, stating that they were great patriots and that Ronsin should not be punished for attacking Dumouriez, Custine, and Brissot. Among those who were defending Ronsin was Collot d'Herbois, who was also part of the committee. Collot d'Herbois defended Ronsin, saying that while fighting in the South along with all of the other patriots of the Revolution, Ronsin showed great determination in enforcing respect for the republic.

With the help of Fouquier-Tinville, Ronsin was believed to be working on a military conspiracy to replace the revolutionary government with a military dictatorship. Fouquier-Tinville called him one of the "new Cromwell".

Ronsin was finally arrested along with Hébert, Momoro, and Vincent. While in prison Ronsin is quoted with saying these words to his co-accused: "...you will be condemned. When you should have acted, you talked. Know how to die. For my part, I swear that you shall not see me flinch. Strive to do the same." Some of his final words before his death were, "Liberty undone!...because a few paltry fellows are about to perish! Liberty is immortal. Our enemies will fall in their turn, and liberty will survive them all!" On 24 March 1794, five carts full of condemned Hébertists were taken to the guillotine, Charles-Philippe Ronsin among them. Their death of was a sort of carnival, a pleasant spectacle according to Michelet's witnesses. Ronsin stayed true to his words in prison: as Thomas Carlyle relates the event, he alone among the Hébertists went to the scaffold with an "air of defiance", still maintaining a steely "eye of command". Within a week of his death, Ronsin's army (l'Armée Révolutionnaire de Paris) was disbanded.

== Works ==
- 1786 -Théatre de M. Ronsin, imprimé au profit de sa belle-mere. A Paris: De l'imprimerie Cailleau
- 1789 - La ligue aristocratique, ou, Les catilinaires françoises. Paris: Au Palais-Royal, de l'imprimerie de Josseran
- 1790 - Louis XII, Père du Peuple. Tragédie, dédiée a la Garde Nationale. A Paris, chez L. Potier de Lille
- 1792 - Discours prononcé par Ch. Ph. Ronsin, le samedi 18 août 1792, l'an 4ème. de la liberté et le premier de l'egalité, à la section du Théâtre François, dite de Marseille, à l'occasion de la cérémonie funèbre ordonnée en l'honneur de nos frères d'armes morts à la journée du 10, pour la défense de la liberté et de l'égalite. A Paris: De l'imprimerie de Pougin
- 1792 - Grand discours fait par Ch.-Ph. Ronsin, l'an 4me. de la liberté, et le 1er. de l'égalité, à l'occasion de la cérémonie funèbre, faite le 26 août 1792, au jardin des Tuileries, ordonnée en l'honneur de nos frères d'armes morts à la journée du 10, pour la défense de la liberté et de l'égalité. Paris]: De l'imprimerie de Pougin
- 1793 - Arétaphile, ou, La révolution de Cyrene : tragédie, en cinq actes, en vers, faite en 1786. Représentée, pour la première fois, sur le théâtre de la rue de Louvois, le 23 juin 1792. A Paris, Chez Guillaume, junior
