= Outline of the French Revolution =

Revolution in France from 1789 to 1799

The following outline is an overview of and topical guide to the French Revolution.

The French Revolution was a period resulting in the political and societal changes in France that began with the Estates General of 1789 and ended with the Coup of 18 Brumaire on 9 November 1799. Many of the revolution's ideas are considered fundamental principles of liberal democracy, and its values remain central to modern French political discourse. It was caused by a combination of social, political, and economic factors which the existing regime proved unable to manage.

Financial crisis and widespread social distress led to the convocation of the Estates General in May 1789, its first meeting since February 1614. The representatives of the Third Estate broke away and re-constituted themselves as a National Assembly in June. The Storming of the Bastille in Paris on 14 July led to a series of radical measures by the Assembly, including the abolition of feudalism, state control over the Catholic Church in France, and issuing the Declaration of the Rights of Man and of the Citizen.

== What type of thing is the French Revolution? ==
- An event in history
  - A war
    - A revolution

== Terminology ==
- Glossary of the French Revolution

== Background ==
Factors which can be seen as leading to the French Revolution:

- Ancien régime
- Ruling Elite
- Age of Enlightenment
- American Revolution
  - Influence of the American Revolution on the French Revolution
- Anglo-French War (1778–1783)
- Affair of the Diamond Necklace
- Estates General of 1789
- Tennis Court Oath

== Important events ==
- Timeline of the French Revolution

=== Abolition of the Ancien Régime ===
- Storming of the Bastille
- Creation of the Paris Commune
- August Decrees
- Abolition of feudalism in France
- National Assembly (French Revolution)
- Declaration of the Rights of Man and of the Citizen
- Women's March on Versailles
- Insurrection of 10 August 1792
- Proclamation of the abolition of the monarchy

=== Creation of the First French Republic ===
French First Republic

- Legislative Assembly
- National Convention
- Execution of Louis XVI
- Insurrection of 31 May – 2 June 1793
- September Massacres
- Creation of the French Republican calendar
- Creation of the Committee of Public Safety
- Commission of Twelve
- French Constitution of 1793

=== Reign of terror ===
Reign of Terror

- Law of General Maximum
- Law of Suspects
- Drownings at Nantes
- Anti-Religious Policies
- Law of 22 Prairial
- Cult of the Supreme Being
- Fall of Maximilien Robespierre

=== Thermidorian Reaction ===
Thermidorian Reaction

- First White Terror
- Law of 22 Prairial
- Companions of Jehu
- Constitution of the Year III
- Council of Ancients
- Council of Five Hundred
- Hyperinflation of Assignat

=== The Directory ===
French Directory

- 13 Vendémiaire
- 1795 French legislative election
- Conspiracy of the Equals
- Coup of 18 Fructidor
- 1798 French legislative election

=== The Consulate ===
French Consulate

- 1799 French legislative election
- Coup of 30 Prairial VII
- Coup of 18 Brumaire
- French Consulate
- Constitution of the Year VIII
- Napoleon proclaims himself Emperor of the French

== Leading political figures ==
=== Political parties and clubs ===
- Cordeliers
- Enragés
- Girondins
- Hébertists
- Jacobins
- Sans-culottes
- The Mountain

=== Political Leaders ===
- Bertrand Barère
- Billaud-Varenne
- Camille Desmoulins
- Collot d'Herbois
- Georges Couthon
- Georges Danton
- Marie-Jean Hérault de Séchelles
- Jean-Lambert Tallien
- Jacques Pierre Brissot
- Jean-Paul Marat
- Jean Jacques Régis de Cambacérès
- Joseph Fouché
- Lazare Carnot
- Louis Antoine de Saint-Just
- Maximilien Robespierre
- Paul Barras

== French Revolutionary Wars ==
French Revolutionary Wars

=== Participants ===
==== Anti-French coalition ====
- Catholic and Royal Armies
  - Armée des Émigrés
- Dutch Republic (1793–95)
- Holy Roman Empire
  - Austria (until 1801)
  - Prussia (1792–95)
  - Prince-Bishopric of Würzburg
  - Baden
  - Landgraviate of Hesse-Kassel
  - Wurttemberg
  - Brunswick
- Kingdom of Great Britain (Until 1801)
  - Anglo-Corsican Kingdom (until 1796)
- United Kingdom
- Kingdom of Spain (1793–95)
- Kingdom of Sardinia
- Kingdom of Naples
- Old Swiss Confederacy (1798)
- Order of Saint John (1798)
- Malta (1798–1800)
- Ottoman Empire
- Portugal
- Russia (1799)
- Tuscany

==== France and allies ====
- Kingdom of France (until 1792)
- French Republic (from 1792)
  - Batavian Republic (1795–1802)
  - Irish Republic
  - Polish Legions
  - Helvetic Republic (1798, 1802)
- Spain (1796–1802)

=== War of the First Coalition ===
- War of the First Coalition
- List of battles of the War of the First Coalition
- Campaigns of 1792 in the French Revolutionary Wars
- Campaigns of 1793 in the French Revolutionary Wars
- Campaigns of 1794 in the French Revolutionary Wars
- Campaigns of 1795 in the French Revolutionary Wars
- Campaigns of 1796 in the French Revolutionary Wars
- Campaigns of 1797 in the French Revolutionary Wars
- Campaigns of 1798 in the French Revolutionary Wars

=== War of the Second Coalition ===
- War of the Second Coalition
- Campaigns of 1799 in the French Revolutionary Wars
- Campaigns of 1800 in the French Revolutionary Wars
- Campaigns of 1801 in the French Revolutionary Wars
- Treaty of Amiens

== Leading military figures ==
=== France ===
- André Masséna
- Charles François Dumouriez
- François Kellermann
- Jean-Baptiste Jourdan
- Jean-Charles Pichegru
- Jean Lannes
- Jean Victor Moreau
- Lazare Hoche
- Jean Humbert
- Louis Desaix
- Marquis de Lafayette
- Napoleon Bonaparte

=== Spain ===
- Antonio Ricardos
- Ignacio de Álava
- Luis Firmín

=== Catholic and royal armies ===
- Prince of Condé
- Jacques Cathelineau
- Henri de la Rochejaquelein
- Georges Cadoudal
- Jean Chouan

=== Holy Roman Empire ===
- József Alvinczi
- Michael von Melas
- Count of Clerfayt
- Prince Josias
- Sigmund von Wurmser

=== Prussia ===
- Frederick William II
- Duke of Brunswick
- Prince of Hohenlohe

=== Great Britain ===
- Horatio Nelson
- Ralph Abercromby
- Sidney Smith

== Cultural aspects of the French Revolution ==
- Symbolism in the French Revolution

== Publications about the French Revolution ==
- Bibliography of the French Revolution

== Notable people associated with the French Revolution ==
- List of political groups in the French Revolution
- List of people associated with the French Revolution

== The French Revolution in popular media ==
- List of films set during the French Revolution and French Revolutionary Wars

== See also ==
- Age of Revolution
- Bourgeois revolution
- Cordeliers
- Democracy in Europe
- History of France
- History of Savoy (1792–1815)
- Paris in the 18th century

=== Place these in the outline above ===
- Musée de la Révolution française
- Savoy's annexation to France (1792)
