= Courbis =

Courbis is a French surname. Notable people with the surname include:

- Jean-Antoine Courbis (1752–1795), French lawyer and revolutionary
- Paul Courbis (born 1967), French programmer
- Rolland Courbis (1953–2026), French footballer and manager
