= Companions of Jesus =

Companions of Jesus may refer to:

- Apostles of Jesus
- Faithful Companions of Jesus, a Catholic religious order
- Companions of Jehu, a group of militant French anti-Jacobins in the 1790s
