= Centre-right politics =

Political orientation

Centre-right politics is the set of right-wing political ideologies that lean closer to the political centre. It is commonly associated with conservatism, Christian democracy, liberal conservatism, and conservative liberalism. Conservative and liberal centre-right political parties have historically performed better in elections in the Anglosphere than other centre-right parties, while Christian democracy has been the primary centre-right ideology in Europe.

The centre-right commonly supports ideas such as small government, law and order, freedom of religion, and strong national security. It has historically stood in opposition to radical politics, redistributive policies, multiculturalism, illegal immigration, and LGBT acceptance. Economically, the centre-right supports free markets and the social market economy, with market liberalism and neoliberalism being common centre-right economic positions. It typically seeks to preserve the cultural and socioeconomic status quo and believes that changes should be implemented gradually.

The centre-right is derived from the left–right political spectrum of the French Revolution. It first developed as a political force with the creation of party systems in the 19th century, when monarchist and religious conservatives competed with individualist and anti-clerical liberals. Christian democracy developed in the 1870s as another response to anti-clericalism. The centre-right provided a moderate position to compete with socialism in the 19th century, and it became a driving force for liberal democracy in the early 20th century.

The centre-right was reconfigured in the aftermath of World War II to temper support for nationalism; it became a dominant political position throughout the Western world, particularly with the spread of Christian democracy across Europe. It aligned with the Western bloc during the Cold War, and in Europe it heavily influenced democratic consolidation and European integration. Global economic downturn in the 1970s caused a rise in support for neoliberalism and neoconservatism. The dissolution of the Soviet Union allowed a new centre-right movement to develop and take power in Central and Eastern Europe through the 1990s. The 2008 financial crisis led to declining support for the centre-right.

== Ideologies ==
The centre-right is heterogeneous and encompasses multiple distinct ideologies. Centre-right parties and coalitions are traditionally understood to be divided into separate factions depending on their priorities: economic, social, and cultural. They are unified by their opposition to left-wing politics.

Christian democracy is a political ideology predominant in Europe that is often described as centre-right. It applies Christian morality to political issues, giving a religious justification for supporting democratization, individual liberties, and international cooperation. Christian democrats hold conservative positions on most issues, but in a more moderate fashion than groups specifically described as conservative, and they trend centrist on economic issues. Instead of a strong government, it advocates decentralization where other social units such as family, the community, and various organizations are major actors in society. While still supporting a market economy, Christian democrats are more open to market intervention than conservatives, so as to prevent social inequality. Unlike historical Christian political movements, Christian democracy is non-denominational and is not affiliated with the Catholic Church. Political scientists disagree as to whether post-war Christian democracy is continuous with that of the 19th century or if it is a new school of thought. Conservatism is commonly grouped with the centre-right, though adherents of the far-right may argue that the centre-right is insufficiently conservative. Liberalism is sometimes grouped with the centre-right when it is expressed as conservative liberalism. The centre-right can also include a liberal variant of conservatism. Conservative centre-right parties are more likely to incorporate ethnic nationalism relative to liberal centre-right parties. Conservatives and liberals both oppose heavy governmental involvement in the economy. Right-liberalism is common in Europe, contrasted with the centrist liberalism in Canada and the United Kingdom, and with the left-liberalism of the United States. Economic ideologies associated with the centre-right include neoliberalism and market liberalism. Other ideologies sometimes grouped under the centre-right descriptor include agrarianism and populist nationalism.

Centre-right liberal and conservative parties have historically been successful in the Anglosphere, such as those in Australia, New Zealand, and the United Kingdom, and they have made up the primary centre-right ideologies in Scandinavia. In contemporary politics, these two ideologies often co-exist in the same party. Christian democracy has been the predominant centre-right ideology in continental Europe, particularly in Austria, Belgium, Germany, Italy, and the Netherlands. It has performed most successfully in Catholic countries, while Christian democracy in other countries takes on more left-wing positions or fails to gain influence. Christian democratic parties are affiliated with the Centrist Democrat International and centre-right liberal parties are affiliated with the International Democracy Union. In Europe, centre-right parties are affiliated with the European People's Party.

== Positions ==
=== Governance ===
Centre-right politics is associated with conservative positions on social and cultural issues and free-market liberal positions on economic issues while being opposed to not only left wing politics, but Also far right politics—centre-right parties see their strongest support among demographics that share all of these positions. It broadly supports small government, though different factions hold different beliefs about when the state should intervene in economic and social affairs. Conservatives generally have limited trust in human nature and believe society forms a natural hierarchical structure. Liberalism is individualist and maintains that people are best fit to make decisions for themselves. Christian democrats lean toward personalism, which places value on individuals but adopts collectivist and corporatist elements as well as hierarchy.

The centre-right generally seeks to preserve the societal status quo, in both a cultural and socioeconomic context, and it is opposed to the radical politics espoused by the far-right. Instead, it displays loss-averse tendencies and leans toward gradualism. Constitutionalism and separation of powers are championed by the centre-right, combining protections for individual liberties with rule of law. The centre-right's handling of the economy, its incrementalist approach to politics, and its support for the status quo have been attributed to its ability to remain in power for extended periods of time.

=== Economics ===
The centre-right commonly supports a social market economy, rejecting both socialism and laissez-faire capitalism. First developed by Christian democrats in post-war Germany, this system allows the state to intervene in the economy to regulate how business may be conducted, but it opposes nationalization or infringement on the free market. Social market economies allow cooperation between employers and unions, and they provide for basic welfare programs. This is more common among centre-right parties that appeal to working-class voters, as they otherwise have less incentive to hold these positions. Centre-right conservatives oppose redistributive policies, believing that individuals should be allowed to retain their wealth. This tends to attract the more wealthy to the ideology. While left-wing politics involves class conflict, centre-right parties forgo this in favour of supporting overall economic growth across classes.

Alongside its support for lowering spending, the centre-right supports lower taxes. In some cases, they may advocate private-public partnership or emphasize policies geared toward economic growth—these traits are common in Latin America where centre-right parties differentiate themselves from far-right parties by appealing to the middle and working classes. In most countries, centre-right ideologies such as conservatism and Christian democracy are perceived by the public as most capable of managing the economy. Economic downturn often leads to a short-term benefit for centre-right parties before a longer-term benefit for centre-left parties.

=== Social and cultural issues ===
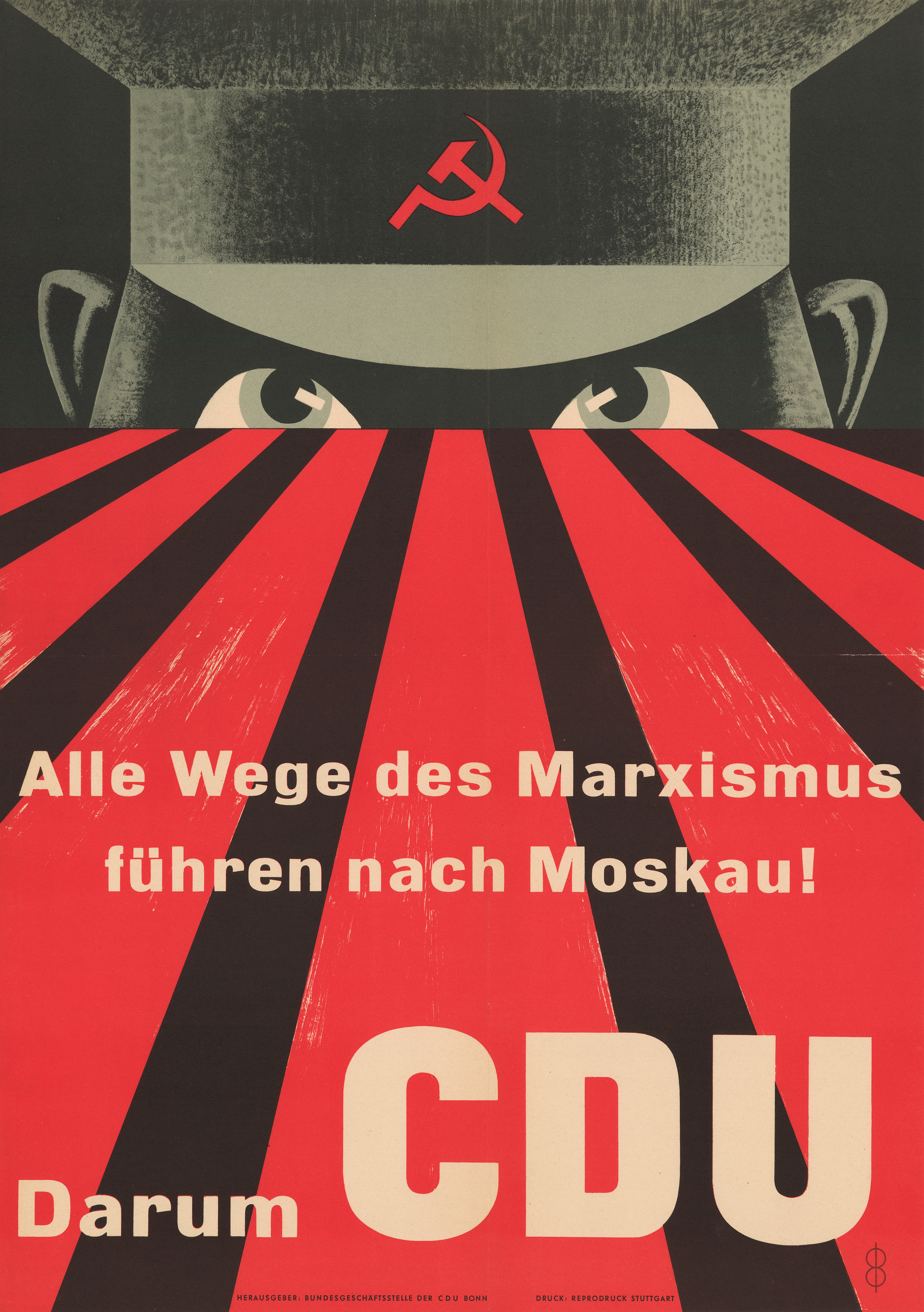
A 1953 poster for the centre-right Christian Democratic Union in Germany, invoking anti-communism. In English: "All ways of Marxism lead to Moscow! Therefore CDU"

The centre-right places emphasis on protecting public safety, preserving national security, and maintaining law and order. It supports democratization around the world, and some centre-right groups consider regime change an appropriate means to spread and protect democracy. Taking a strong pro-peace stance can alienate members of a centre-right voting bloc. It is often more reluctant to support peace agreements because these often involve compromising on other centre-right positions such as maintaining a strong ethnic and religious identity. The centre-right leans toward paternalism over individualism and social harmony over societal conflict. It is also associated with anti-communism, which earned it support during the Cold War.

Culturally, the centre-right has prioritized national and religious identity, especially by the mid-20th century. It has used religion and moral values as uniting elements, particularly with the middle class. European centre-right parties place higher priority on Christianity and providing support to Christians—a trait often shared with their far-right counterparts. The centre-right more strongly supports freedom of religion overall, as opposed to generalized support of human rights expressed by left-wing ideologies. As the European centre-right secularizes, it becomes less likely to support conservative positions on social issues. Centre-right parties that take strong stances on cultural issues are more susceptible to radicalize and adopt far-right positions.

While opposition to immigration is most commonly associated with far-right politics, the centre-right can attract support from voters with more moderate anti-immigrant positions. Centre-right opposition to immigration comes from the challenge that immigration presents to the status quo and to national identity. Supporters of centre-right politics in Europe often fear that immigration will lead to consequences such as increased crime, abuse of welfare, or acts of terrorism. Centre-right political parties sometimes take stronger positions against multiculturalism to gain an advantage over far-right parties. The centre-right is more likely to present immigration as a prominent issue when it is placed in the context of economic and cultural policy.

Right-wing politics has historically opposed social acceptance of lesbian, gay, and bisexual people, but the European centre-right has come to support protections on the basis of sexual orientation. Some centre-right groups have taken the position that gay marriage and adoption by gay couples are an extension of the traditional nuclear family. Such support has not been widely extended to transgender people.

Centre-right parties support environmental preservation, though they are often seen as less interested in the subject than left-wing parties. The centre-right rejects concepts of climate grief or catastrophism, arguing that they can reduce interest in solving environmental issues.

== History ==
=== Early history ===
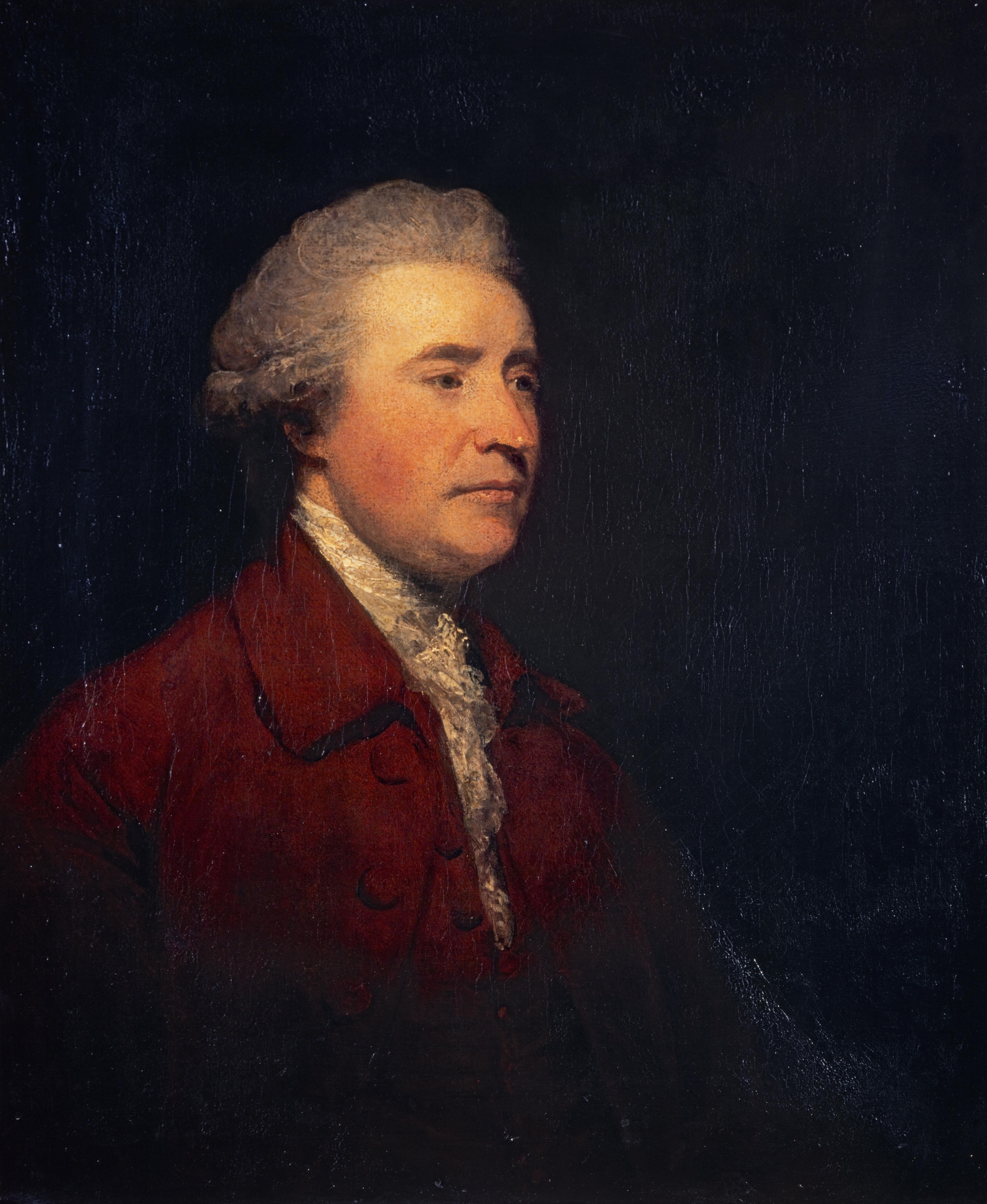
The philosophy of Edmund Burke was a foundation for modern conservatism.

The concept of centre-right politics is derived from the left–right political spectrum, which originated with the seating arrangements of the National Assembly during the French Revolution. The centre-right came into being in the 19th century, developing with the earliest political parties. Modern conservatism was derived from the ideas of British philosopher Edmund Burke and various 17th century figures who preceded him. The liberal movement was heavily influenced by English philosopher John Locke, including his support for property rights and the right to overthrow tyrannical government.

Early conservative and liberal parties clashed with one another: conservatives supported monarchy, land-owners, and the church, while liberals supported anti-clericalism, free markets, individualism, and scientific advancement. Due to limitations in suffrage, early centre-right parties were able to maintain sufficient support by appealing solely to the upper class. Christian democracy developed as a new European ideology in the 1870s as a response to the anti-clericalism advocated by liberals. Closely aligned with Catholicism, its ideals were reflected in the Rerum novarum issued by Pope Leo XIII.

The European centre-right was a force of moderation in the late 19th and early 20th centuries. Conservatism stood between socialism and the strongly anti-socialist church by advocating a more tempered approach. Christian democracy likewise presented itself as an alternative to liberalism and socialism. Centre-right figures were involved in early democratization processes to ensure that their own advantages from the previous status quo were retained. Centre-right liberalism declined with the beginning of the 20th century, and many liberal parties merged with conservative parties.

=== Interwar period ===
After World War I, several European nations formed weak centre-right parties, which grew through a consolidation of the middle-class at the expense of socialist parties. These centre-right parties gained influence during the Depression of 1920–1921, where they responded with measures such as a restoration of the gold standard. Among the strongest of these parties were National Bloc and its successors in France, the Conservative Party in the United Kingdom, and a coalition of the Catholic Conservative Party and the Radicals in Switzerland. Christian democracy found a place among the European centre-right during the interwar period. Centre-right parties became the primary supporters of liberal democracy at this time, challenging the historical association of liberalism with the labour movement. The liberal centre-right opposed the other two European ideologies that were growing in popularity: fascism and social democracy.

The European centre-right declined between 1931 and 1935 as the Great Depression set in. In nations where the centre-right lacked a unified party, such as Germany, Italy, Portugal, and Spain, far-right movements seized power. Strong pre-existing centre-right parties retained power in other countries, including Belgium, Denmark, the Netherlands, Sweden, and the United Kingdom. The use of market economics to keep wages steady, as well as the relative weakness of labour unions, meant that centre-right liberalism went unchallenged in much of Europe.

=== Post-war era ===
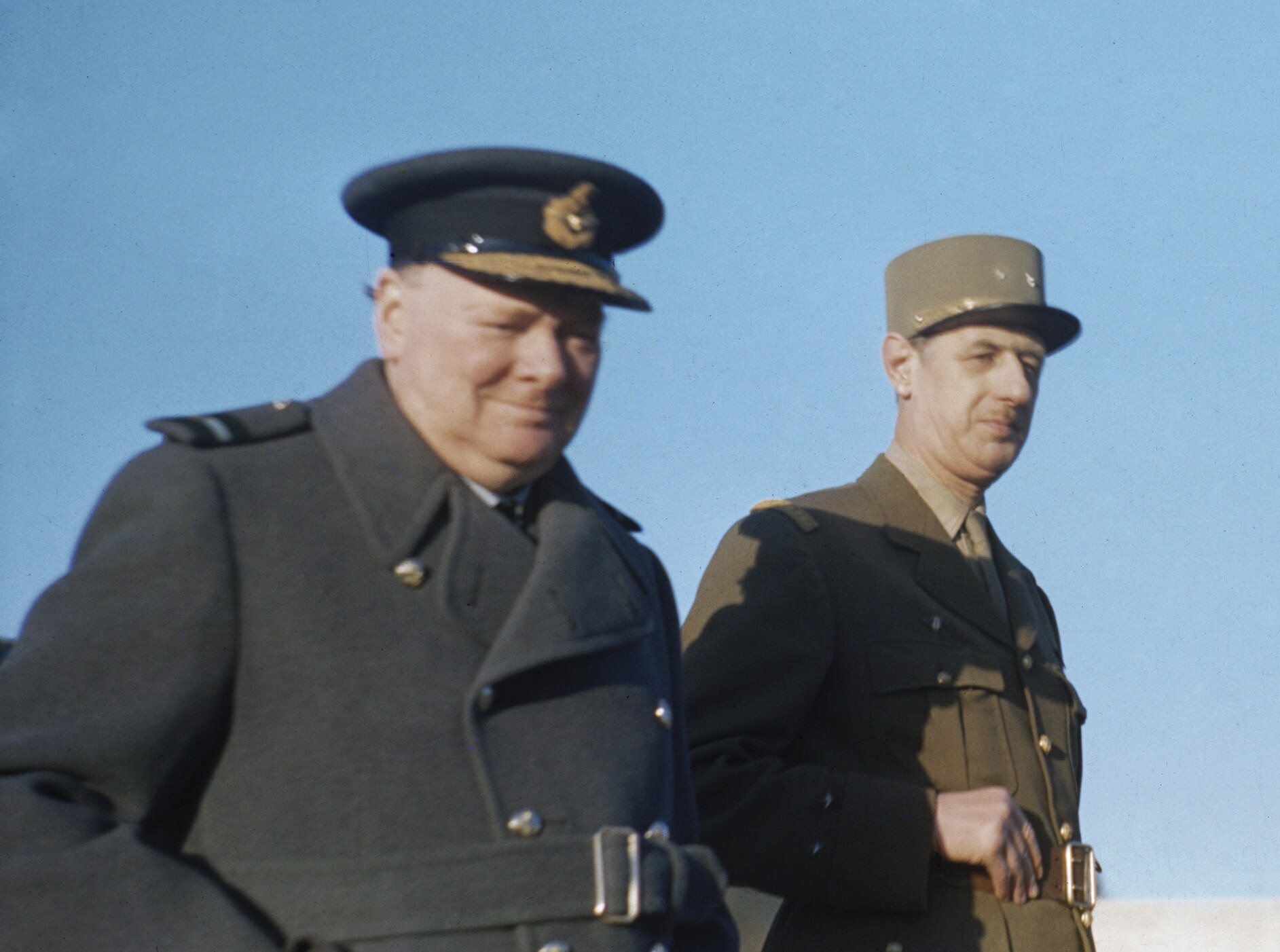
Winston Churchill (left) and Charles de Gaulle (right) were leading post-war figures of British conservatism and Gaullism, respectively.

In the aftermath of World War II, the old centre-right was discredited in Europe, where it was seen as responsible for the Great Depression and complicit in the rise of fascism. European centre-right parties worked closely with the centre-left and the political centre in the post-war era, helping to define the welfare state, democratic consolidation, and European integration. They sought to avoid the far-right and far-left politics that had brought about Nazi Germany and the Soviet Union, respectively, and they saw European integration as a means to protect against socialism and anti-Christianity. The modern centre-right developed in response as a political unification of several distinct right-wing schools of thought. Ideological diversity meant flexibility in policy positions, but it also caused factionalism across centre-right parties. The centre-right became a dominant political force in much of the western world over the following decades, including the American Republican Party as led by Dwight D. Eisenhower, one-nation conservatism of the British Conservative Party, and Gaullism of the Rally of the French People.

Europe had little appetite for nationalist ideologies after the end of fascism, so Christian democracy was popularized as an alternative right-wing ideology. Instead of nationalism, its ideas were based on traditional values, pragmatism, and support for moderate state intervention. Its conception of government was heavily influenced by the constitutionalism and separation of powers of the United Kingdom and the United States. West Germany reformed its centre-right faction with the creation of the Christian Democratic Union of Germany (CDU). Formed by a grassroots Christian movement, the CDU played a significant role in forming post-war Germany, combining social Christianity, market liberalism, and national conservatism. Its social market economy model proved to be influential across Europe. Alcide De Gasperi similarly brought about the creation of a strong Christian democratic movement in Italy, which was a leading political force in various coalitions for over 50 years. The United Kingdom was the only major exception to the spread of Christian democracy, as its old centre-right was seen as triumphant under the wartime leadership of Winston Churchill, and the failure of Nazi Germany to invade meant that its pre-war institutions remained intact. Here conservatism remained dominant, meaning less state intervention relative to other European nations.

=== Cold War ===
During the Cold War, centre-right groups supported the United States and the Western Bloc, opposing the Soviet Union and the Eastern Bloc. In several countries, centre-right parties were opposed by domestic communism on top of their opposition to the Soviet Union. As suffrage expanded and the centre-right spread across social classes, cultural issues and social identity, such as support for nationalism and religion, became more prominent themes. The European centre-right began supporting social integration as a means to limit the appeal of the nationalism that had led to fascism. In the United States, the centre-right was associated with the Rockefeller Republican faction of the Republican Party. The American centre-right promoted pro-business stances over the following decades, which led to economic justifications for supporting higher taxes as well as social programs such as public housing.

Christian democrats supported a modest welfare state, and the European centre-right was reluctant to support more radical initiatives to liberalize the economy. In Southeast Asia, the centre-right secured power in countries such as Indonesia, Malaysia, and Thailand, implementing growth-oriented policies based on free market policies with moderate governmental intervention, leading to significant economic expansion. The centre-right rose to power in Greece with the New Democracy party in the 1970s, led by Konstantinos Karamanlis as Greece transitioned from dictatorship to democracy. Spain and Portugal underwent similar transitions as they emerged from dictatorship.

The 1970s saw decreasing support for welfare policies with the end of the postwar economic boom and the economic fallout of the 1970s energy crisis. This led to increased support for privatization and cuts in welfare spending. It also led a period of opposition to immigration in Europe at this time. By the 1980s, the post-war consensus had ended, with the new right supporting neoconservatism and neoliberalism. At this time, centre-right parties took a more active role in challenging the welfare state and union influence.

The predominantly centre-right United States Republican Party began a rightward shift in the 1980s, with its moderate factions declining in numbers over the following decades. The Indian Bharatiya Janata Party followed the Western centre-right strategy in the 1980s and 1990s, appealing to the centre while maintaining a militarist, nationalist platform. New political parties were formed in Turkey after the 1980 coup d'état, and the Motherland Party, led by businessmen and tradesmen, implemented secular neoliberal policies. In European nations, women were most likely to support the centre-right until a leftward shift among women took place over the 1970s and 1980s.

=== 1990s ===
Eastern and Central Europe were introduced to centre-right politics in the 1990s after the dissolution of the Soviet Union. These movements—which preferred not to be identified as parties due to the term's association with communism—were made up of intellectual groups that had been dissidents during communist rule. The Czech Republic, Hungary, and Poland all had strong opposition movements under communism, allowing these movements to form strong centre-right parties. In nations where the centre-right lacked experience in political organization, many of the first-generation centre-right movements lost momentum and faded into irrelevance in the years thereafter. Nationalism and populism became the dominant political forces here until the end of the decade.

Centre-right liberals in Central and Eastern Europe supported integration with the Western World and acceleration of industrialization, while conservatives wished to preserve individual national identities and protect Catholic traditions from Western secularism. Post-communist centre-right groups were more inclined toward liberal positions, favouring market capitalist policies over government intervention, which was associated with communist rule. Anti-communism and anti-totalitarianism were paramount among all factions of the centre-right in these regions, and they condemned the West for treating mass killings under communist regimes differently than the Holocaust.

More broadly, the European centre-right became increasingly secular by the 1990s, creating a division between centre-right parties that were more liberal on social issues and religious right parties that maintained conservative positions on social issues. Secularism especially became a challenge for Christian democracy, causing it to lose political influence. African political parties rapidly began joining political internationals in the 1990s. Among the centre-right, collaboration began between the Ghana New Patriotic Party, the Malawi Congress Party, and the Kenya Democratic Party. Japan, which had been ruled almost consistently by the centre-right Liberal Democratic Party for decades, saw a proliferation of centre-right opposition parties by the 1990s, with new parties forming and established parties shifting toward the centre-right to remain competitive.

Following the rise of the Third Way among left-wing politics in the 1990s, the centre-right was forced to moderate, sacrificing the more aggressive aspects of right-wing politics that developed in the 1980s and abandoning its opposition to the welfare state. It saw reduced support at this time as the centre-left usurped much of its leverage on economic issues. In Western Europe, this marked the beginning of a broader decline in moderate politics.

=== 21st century ===
The 2000s saw a shift back to the right in Europe, where centre-right parties formed coalition governments with far-right parties in countries such as France, Italy, and the Netherlands. The European and American centre-right adopted some nationalist far-right ideas at this time, including positions on immigration and crime. Centre-right parties in other countries shifted leftward with pro-labour policies to remain competitive with the centre-left—this included parties in Denmark, Finland, the Netherlands, New Zealand, and Sweden. The 2000s also saw an example of a successful populist centre-right party with the ascension of Forza Italia, led by Silvio Berlusconi.

During the 2003 invasion of Iraq, centre-right parties in Europe were more likely to send military forces than centre-left parties. This was especially true in Central and Eastern Europe, where memories of the Soviet Union encouraged close alignment with the United States and strong support for combatting dictatorships. The centre-right in this region fragmented at the onset of the 21st century as much of the centre-right shifted away from liberalism to more conservative and nationalist politics with a strong stance against European integration. As Islamism lost support in Turkey, many Islamists moved to the centre-right, forming the new Justice and Development Party. This party was more accepting of secularism and neoliberalism, and it became the nation's dominant political force.

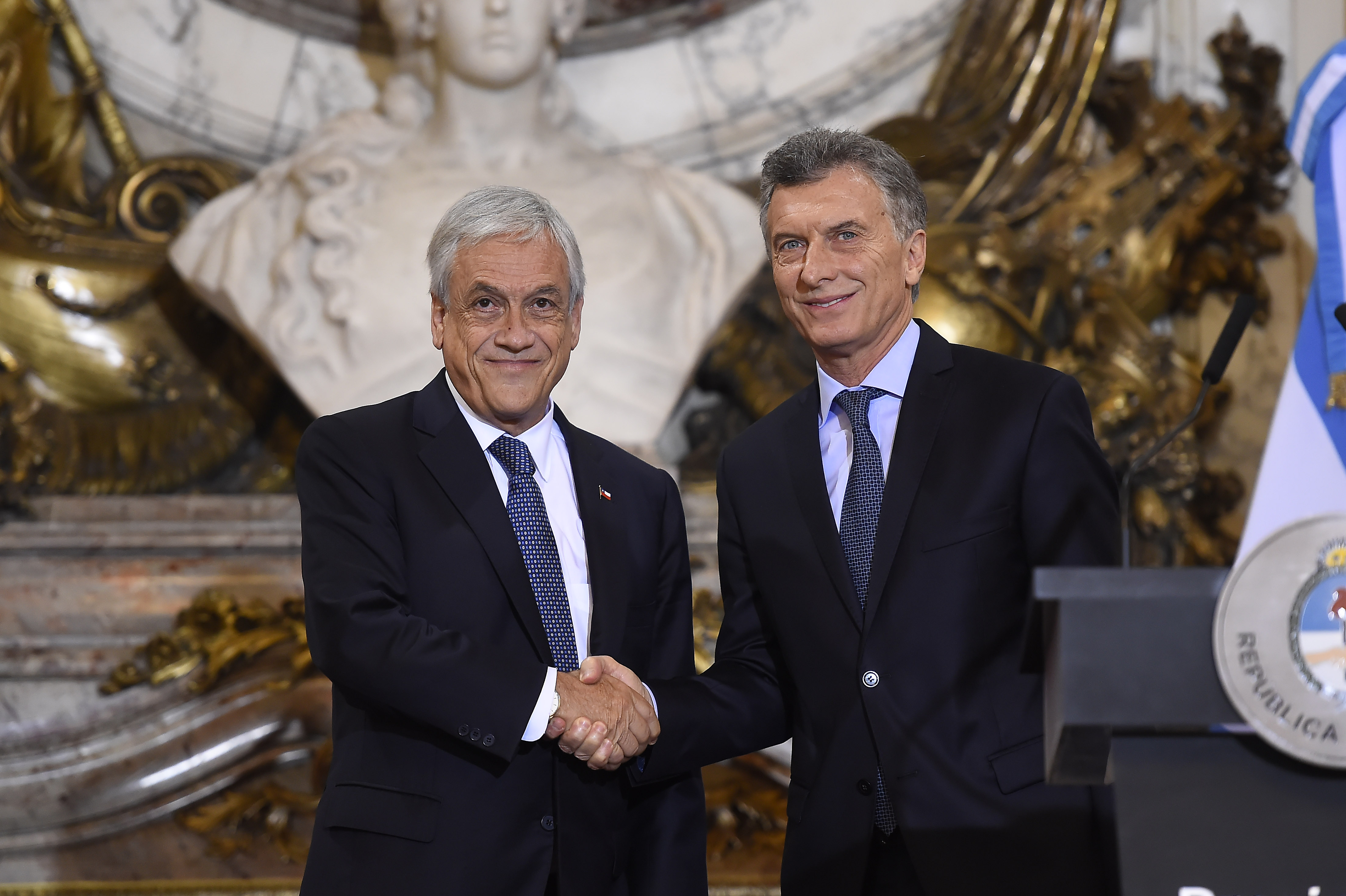
Presidents Sebastián Piñera (left) of Chile and Mauricio Macri (right) of Argentina were elected amid a resurgence of the centre-right in their respective nations in the 2010s.

Although citizens throughout Latin America most commonly self-identified as centre-right, the region saw a surge of popularity for expanding government programs and state ownership, leading to a leftward shift that began in 1998. In Bolivia, dissatisfaction with the centre-right's handling of economic crises reached a crescendo with public demonstrations that relegated the centre-right to a relatively ineffective opposition. Colombia was an exception, where the long-standing centre-right dominance remained unchallenged. Centre-right parties retook power in several Latin American countries by the 2010s, including the National Renewal in Chile and the Republican Proposal in Argentina, as well as a centre-right coalition in Venezuela.

Canada was one of the last Anglosphere countries for the centre-right to be restored after World War II, with no centre-right parties holding power until the premiership of Stephen Harper in 2006. The 2008 financial crisis was followed by a decline in support for major centre-right and centre-left parties through the 2010s. For the centre-right, this occurred most prominently in newer democracies, while support was steadier in more established ones. To regain support, the European centre-right shifted toward the centre and moved away from neoliberalism, replacing it with a renewed focus on public safety, economic growth, and social issues. It saw further trouble later in the decade with the European debt crisis causing governments to enact controversial austerity policies, particularly through spending cuts and value-added taxes. These further pushed the public from the centre-right to opposition parties across the political spectrum. The weakening of the centre-right corresponded with increased support for the far-right.

To align more closely with conservative allies, Christian democratic parties had begun adopting more conservative economic policies by 2013. The American centre-right supported traditionalist conservatism and neoconservatism at the beginning of the 21st century; however, by the 2010s these groups had lost influence as the Republican Party shifted from the centre-right to right-wing populism.

The centre-right underwent a decline throughout the western world in the late 2010s and early 2020s, led by demographic changes such as increased tertiary education and ethnic diversity as well as the waning influence of religion and the rise of identity politics. At this time, the centre-left came into power and centre-right parties drifted rightward or were supplanted by new far-right parties.

== See also ==
- Bourgeois party – German political party description
- Classical liberalism – Ideology supporting both civil and economic liberties
- Counter-revolutionary – Someone who opposes a revolution
- Cultural conservatism – Conservative ideology advocating for the preservation of cultural traditions
- Glossary of the French Revolution
- List of right-wing political parties
- Moderate conservatism – Politically moderate variant of conservatism
- National liberalism – Liberalism combined with elements of nationalism
- Paternalistic conservatism – Strand of conservatism
- Reactionary – Political view advocating return to a previous societal state
- Religion in politics
- Whiggism – British political philosophy
