= The Companions of Jehu =

1857 novel

- 1955 edition
- Author: Alexandre Dumas
- Language: French
- Genre: Historical adventure
- Publication date: 1857
- Publication place: France
- Media type: Print

The Companions of Jehu (French: Les Compagnons de Jéhu) is a historical adventure novel by the French writer Alexandre Dumas first published in 1857. It is inspired by the story of the Companions of Jehu, a group of Royalist vigilantes during the French Revolution. It was also turned into a play by Dumas and Charles Gabet premiering at the Théâtre de la Gaîté on 2 July 1857.

== Adaptations ==
In 1946 it provided the loose inspiration for the American swashbuckler film The Fighting Guardsman produced by Columbia Pictures and starring Willard Parker, Anita Louise and Janis Carter. In 1966 it was made into a French television series The Companions of Jehu which ran for thirteen episodes.

== Bibliography ==
- Best, Janice. Power and Propaganda in French Second Empire Theatre: Playing Napoleon. Cambridge Scholars Publishing, 2023.
- Goble, Alan. The Complete Index to Literary Sources in Film. Walter de Gruyter, 1999.
