= The Fighting Guardsman =

1946 film by Henry Levin

- Directed by: Henry Levin
- Screenplay by: Edward Dein; Franz Schulz
- Based on: The Companions of Jehu by Alexandre Dumas
- Produced by: Michael Kraike
- Starring: Willard Parker; Anita Louise; Janis Carter; John Loder
- Cinematography: Burnett Guffey
- Edited by: Viola Lawrence
- Music by: Paul Sawtell
- Production company: Columbia Pictures
- Distributed by: Columbia Pictures
- Release date: March 1945
- Running time: 84 minutes
- Country: United States
- Language: English

The Fighting Guardsman is a 1945 American historical adventure film directed by Henry Levin and starring Willard Parker, Anita Louise, Janis Carter and John Loder. Distributed by Columbia Pictures, it is a swashbuckler based on the 1857 novel The Companions of Jehu by Alexandre Dumas.

== Plot ==
A French baron leads rebels like a Robin Hood, stealing Louis XVI's taxes to give to the poor. He is love with an aristocrat woman, Amelie, whose brother Gaston is determined to catch the thief.

== Cast ==
- Willard Parker as Roland, also known as the Baron de Saint-Hermaine
- Anita Louise as Amelie de Montrevel
- Janis Carter as Christine Roualt
- John Loder as Sir John Tanlay
- Edgar Buchanan as Pepe
- George Macready as Gaston de Montrevel
- Lloyd Corrigan as King Louis XVI
- Shelley Winters as Nanette
- Edith Evanson as Madame Paquin
- Mauritz Hugo as Andre
- Ray Teal as Albert
- Maurice Tauzin as Edouard de Montrevel
- Victor Kilian as Montebar
- Elisabeth Risdon as Madame de Montrevel
- Ted Hecht as Emile
- Ian Wolfeas Prefect Berton
- John Cason as Baptiste
- Ethan Laidlaw as Jacques
- Gino Corrado as Roualt

== Production ==
It was Parker's first lead role; he made it on his return from the army. Leslie Brooks was to play a key role but fell ill and was replaced by Janis Carter. Filming started in December 1944.

== Reception ==
Variety said "Film, despite its period setting, is an overdressed cops-and-robbers opera with plenty of flintlock and saber play to provide the major source of interest... Henry Levin's direction strives too hard for swashbuckling effects and while the film-goes at a fast clip, it falls foo casily into hokey lines. Attempts to set off Parker as a superman capable of takine on a dozen adversaries imultaneously often brings titters. Acting is routine."
