= Joseph Fernex =

Joseph Fernex (died 14 February 1795) was a judge in the Revolutionary Tribunals during the French Revolution.

A silk weaver from Lyon, close to Joseph Chalier, he was one of fived judges appointed in Lyon following the victory of the revolutionary armies. He later served as a judge in Orange, Vaucluse.

He was killed during the First White Terror in Lyon and his body thrown into the Rhone.
