= List of people associated with the French Revolution =

This is a partial list of people associated with the French Revolution, including supporters and opponents. Note that not all people listed here were French.

== A ==
Reine Audu	Participant in The Women's March on Versailles and the 10 August (French Revolution).
Charles Augereau, duc de Castiglione	Officer throughout the Revolutionary era and Empire; later a general and Marshal of France.
Jean-Pierre-André Amar	Deputy to the National Convention from Isère; member of the Committee of General Security.
== B ==
François-Noël Babeuf	Proto-socialist, guillotined in 1797 after an attempted coup d'etat.
Jean Sylvain Bailly	President of the Third Estate who administered the Tennis Court Oath; made Mayor of Paris after the storming of the Bastille; guillotined during the Reign of Terror.
Antoine Barnave	Constitutional monarchist and Feuillant; guillotined.
Paul Nicolas, vicomte de Barras	A Montagnard, then Thermidorian; ultimately the Directory régime's executive leader.
Madame du Barry	Mistress of King Louis XV and famous victim of the guillotine during the Reign of Terror.
François-Marie, marquis de Barthélemy	Briefly a Director; exiled to French Guiana; returned to France during the Empire.
Jean-Baptiste Bernadotte	General, Ambassador to Vienna and Minister of War; later King of Sweden and Norway.
Joséphine de Beauharnais	Empress; wife of Napoleon Bonaparte.
Louis Alexandre Berthier	General; effectively Napoleon Bonaparte's chief of staff.
Jacques Nicolas Billaud-Varenne	Committee of Public Safety member; survived 9 Thermidor; later deported to French Guiana.
Joseph Bonaparte	Eldest Bonaparte brother; supported his brother Napoleon; later made King of Naples and then Spain.
Lucien Bonaparte	Younger brother of Napoleon; President of the Assembly during the Directory; later fell out with Napoleon.
Napoleon Bonaparte	General; seized power as First Consul in the 18 Brumaire coup. Made virtual dictator as Consul for Life in 1802. Declared Emperor of the French in 1804. Founded the First French Empire.
Louis Antoine de Bourbon, duc d'Enghien	Prince of the Blood; son of the Duc de Bourbon; kidnapped and executed by Napoleon.
Louis François de Bourbon	Prince of the Blood; briefly emigrated from 1789 to 1790, but returned to France; expelled by Directory; died in exile.
Louis Henri, duc de Bourbon	Prince of the Blood, son of the Prince de Condé and father of the Duc d'Enghien; emigrated.
Louis Joseph de Bourbon	Prince of the Blood; composed the Brunswick Manifesto.
Charles de Bouvens	Orator who had to flee the French Revolution due to his conservative views.
Louis de Breteuil	Royalist; briefly supplanted Necker in the royal cabinet.
Cardinal Étienne Charles de Brienne	Royalist; President of the Royal Council of Finances shortly before the Revolution.
Jacques Pierre Brissot de Warville	Girondist (Brissotin); guillotined.
Guillaume Marie Anne Brune	Political journalist; Jacobin; friend of Georges Danton; appointed a general, then Marshal of France; murdered by royalists during the White Terror.
Edmund Burke	English philosopher and politician; author of famous 1790 polemic against the Revolution.
== C ==
Charles Alexandre de Calonne	French Controller-General of Finances from 1783 to 1787, whose discovery of the perilous state of French finances in 1786 precipitated the crisis leading to the Revolution.
Jean Jacques Régis de Cambacérès	Moderate; Second Consul under Bonaparte; chief contributor to the Napoleonic Code.
Pierre Joseph Cambon	Legislative and the Convention member; directed French financial policy and aided in the Thermidor coup.
Lazare Nicolas Marguerite Carnot	Mathematician; physicist; Committee of Public Safety member; "Organizer of Victory"; turned against Robespierre on 9 Thermidor; a Director; ousted in 18 Fructidor coup.
Louis Philippe, duc de Chartres	Eldest son of the Duke of Orleans; defected to Austria with Dumouriez in 1793; later King of France.
Pierre Gaspard Chaumette	Cult of Reason devotee; guillotined, as was fellow devotee Jacques Hébert.
André Chénier	Poet; guillotined.
Jean Chouan	Royalist counter-revolutionary.
Étienne Clavière	Girondist; finance minister 1792; died in prison by suicide 1793.
Anacharsis Cloots	Philosopher and writer; guillotined.
Jean Marie Collot d'Herbois	Actor; Paris Commune member; belated Montagnard; Committee of Public Safety member; deported to French Guiana after 9 Thermidor revolt, where he died.
Marquis de Condorcet	Philosopher; mathematician; Girondist associate; died in prison.
Charlotte Corday	Assassinated Marat; guillotined.
Charles-Augustin de Coulomb	Scientist; metric system pioneer.
Georges Couthon	Montagnard; Committee of Public Safety member; guillotined following 9 Thermidor.
== D ==
Georges Danton	Writer; Jacobin, but neither a Girondist nor a Montagnard; Committee of Public Safety member; guillotined.
Pierre Claude François Daunou	Historian; loosely associated with the Girondists faction; served both Directory and Empire.
Jacques-Louis David	Painter; Montagnard; Committee of General Security member; survived fall from power following 9 Thermidor.
Louis Charles Antoine Desaix	General; killed while leading the French to victory during the Battle of Marengo (1800).
Camille Desmoulins	Journalist; Montagnard; Danton associate; guillotined.
Denis Diderot	Enlightenment author; atheist philosopher; influenced Revolutionary theory.
Jacques François Dugommier	General; National Convention deputy. Killed in 1794 at the Battle of the Black Mountain
Charles François Dumouriez	General; sometime Girondist and Foreign Minister in the Girondist cabinet; eventually defected to Austria.
Pierre Samuel du Pont de Nemours	Constitutional monarchist; National Constituent Assembly president; eventually exiled.
Roger Ducos	Deputy from Landes; member of the Council of Five Hundred; vice-president of the Consulate Senate.
== E ==
Grace Elliott	Scottish courtesan; former mistress of Louis Philippe II, Duke of Orléans; resident in Paris throughout the Revolution.
Antoine Joseph Marie d'Espinassy	Politician, Knight, General and Deputy; Royal of Signes and Revolutionary.
== F ==
Fabre d'Églantine	Author of the French Revolutionary Calendar; guillotined.
Joseph Fesch	Cardinal; closely associated with Napoleon Bonaparte.
Joseph Fouché	Jacobin deputy; Thermidorian; Minister of Police under Napoleon.
Antoine Quentin Fouquier-Tinville	Public Prosecutor during the Reign of Terror; subsequently guillotined (1795).
== G ==
Olympe de Gouges	Writer; advocate of gender equality; guillotined.
Henri Grégoire	Revolutionary priest; supported Civil Constitution of the Clergy.
== H ==
Jacques Hébert	Polemicist; editor of Le Père Duchesne; guillotined.
Marie Jean Hérault	Committee of Public Safety member; revised Condorcet's Constitution of 1793; Danton associate; guillotined.
Lazare Hoche	Soldier rapidly promoted to General during early years of Revolution.
Pierre-Augustin Hulin	Ex-royal soldier and one of the first revolutionaries to enter the Bastille; later general under Bonaparte.
== J ==
Jean-Baptiste Jourdan	General; victor at the battles of Wattignies and Fleurus.
== K ==
François Christophe Kellermann	Promoted to General early in the Revolution; Battle of Valmy hero; Marshal of France; army administrator during Empire years.
Jean-Baptiste Kléber	Revolutionary general; assassinated in 1800.
== L ==
Pierre Choderlos de Laclos	Bonapartist general; author of Les Liaisons dangereuses.
Marie Thérèse, princesse de Lamballe	Friend of Marie Antoinette; victim of the September Massacres.
Gilbert du Motier, Marquis de La Fayette	General; constitutional monarchist, co-wrote the Declaration of the Rights of Man and of the Citizen.
Claire Lacombe	Feminist revolutionary, founder of the Society of Revolutionary Republican Women.
Alexandre-Théodore, comte de Lameth	Leading Feuillant; formed "Triumvirate" with Barnave and Duport; eventually emigrated.
Charles Malo François Lameth	Brother of Alexandre de Lameth; Feuillant; emigrated.
Jean Lannes	Soldier rising through ranks to become general; Marshal of France; close to Bonaparte. Killed at Aspern-Essling in 1809.
Arnaud de Laporte	High royal government official, headed up antirevolutionary activities; second political victim of the guillotine.
Marquis de Launay	Royalist governor of the Bastille; killed after its storming.
Antoine Lavoisier	Scientist; metric pioneer; tax collector; guillotined.
Charles Leclerc	General; close to Bonaparte; served in Haiti.
Philippe-François-Joseph Le Bas	Deputy to the National Convention from Pas-de-Calais; Robespierrist and close ally of Saint-Just; committed suicide at Robespierre's downfall.
Louis Michel le Peletier de Saint-Fargeau	Former noble; voted to execute Louis XVI; assassinated one day before the execution of Louis XVI.
Louis Legendre	Deputy for the Seine, present at various events. Eventual president of the convention, member of the Council of Ancients and Council of Five Hundred.
Jacques-Donatien Le Ray	Promoted French support for the American Revolution.
Jean-Baptiste Robert Lindet	Committee of Public Safety member; opposed Girondist faction.
Toussaint L'Ouverture	Commander of Haitian rebels fighting against French occupying forces; captured and imprisoned by Napoleon's government.
Louis XVI	French king at outbreak of Revolution; deposed; guillotined.
Louis XVII	The "Lost Dauphin"
Nicolas, Comte Luckner	German-born Marshal of France; commanded troops for the First Republic; guillotined during the Reign of Terror.
== M ==
Stanislas-Marie Maillard	National Guardsman; the first revolutionary to enter the fortress in the Storming of the Bastille
Guillaume-Chrétien de Malesherbes	Louis XVI's defense counsel at his trial, although not known as a royalist; guillotined.
Jean-Paul Marat	Radical journalist; Montagnard; assassinated by Charlotte Corday.
François-Séverin Marceau	Soldier who participated in the storming of the Bastille; later a general.
Marie Antoinette	Queen consort of France; deposed, guillotined.
André Masséna	General; victor at the Battle of Zürich. Became Marshal of the Empire in 1804.
Jean-Sifrein Maury	French cardinal; Archbishop of Paris; royalist.
Théroigne de Méricourt	Radical agitator, organizer.
Philippe-Antoine Merlin ("Merlin de Douai")	Director; later a Bonapartist.
Honoré Gabriel Riqueti, comte de Mirabeau ("Mirabeau")	Represented the Third Estate in the Estates-General of 1789, despite being a noble; remained a major political figure throughout the rest of his life.
Antoine-François Momoro	Printer, publisher, and section leader; Hébertist; originator of the phrase Liberté, Égalité, Fraternité; guillotined.
Charles, baron de Montesquieu ("Montesquieu")	Enlightenment political philosopher; influenced Revolutionary thinking
Jean Victor Marie Moreau	General; victor at the Battle of Hohenlinden.
Gouverneur Morris	American minister to France; witness and diarist of the early Revolution, 1792–94.
Jean-François-Auguste Moulin	General; member of the Directory.
Jean Joseph Mounier	Monarchist deputy; president of the National Constituent Assembly, 1789.
Joachim Murat	Prominent cavalry general; became Napoleon's brother-in-law; later made King of Naples. Executed by firing squad in 1815.
== N ==
Jacques Necker	Liberal royalist; Director-General of Finance whose dismissal precipitated the storming of the Bastille.
== O ==
Louis Philippe II, duc d'Orléans	First Prince of the Blood; supported the Revolution, taking the name Philippe Egalité; voted to execute his cousin the King; later guillotined on suspicion of plotting to become King.
Louis Philippe d'Orléans	Prince of the Blood; son of Louis Philippe II, duc d'Orléans; Jacobin; General; broke with the Republic in 1793; exiled from France the same year; later King of the French.
== P ==
Thomas Paine	American revolutionary writer; moved to France during French Revolution but subsequently fell out of favor; arrested, imprisoned and sentenced to death during Reign of Terror, but survived.
Jérôme Pétion de Villeneuve	Insurrectionary mayor of Paris; member of first Committee of Public Safety; associated with Girondists; committed suicide during Reign of Terror.
Pierre Philippeaux	Montagnard; Danton associate; guillotined.
Philippe Egalité	See Orléans, Louis Philippe II, duc d' above.
Charles Pichegru	General; member of the Council of Five Hundred; conspirator in the Coup of 18 Fructidor.
Claude Antoine, comte Prieur-Duvernois ("Prieur de la Côte-d'Or")	Engineer; Committee of Public Safety member; Carnot associate; turned against Robespierre on 9 Thermidor; Council of Five Hundred member during Directory.
Pierre Louis Prieur ("Crieur de la Marne")	National Constituent Assembly secretary; Committee of Public Safety member; exiled following Bourbon Restoration.
Louis, comte de Provence	Louis XVI's younger brother; emigrated 1791; declared himself Louis XVIII, King of France in 1795, but did not actually assume the throne until 1814.
== R ==
Jean-François Rewbell	Deputy; Feuillant; member of the Directory.
Maximilien Robespierre	Montagnard; Committee of Public Safety member; prominent during Reign of Terror; guillotined after 9 Thermidor.
Comte de Rochambeau	Senior general and former commander of French troops during the American Revolution, commander of the Armee du Nord for the Republic; imprisoned during the Reign of Terror but not executed.
Jean-Marie Roland de la Platière	Girondist; interior minister in 1792; committed suicide in 1793 following his wife's condemnation.
Madame Roland (Manon-Jeanne Roland, née Philpon)	Jean-Marie Roland's wife; author of influential Revolutionary writings under Roland's name; salonière; guillotined.
Gilbert Romme	Initially a Girondist politician, then Montagnard; designed French Republican Calendar; condemned after Girondists' return to power; committed suicide before execution.
Jean-Jacques Rousseau	Enlightenment political philosopher; influenced Revolutionary thinking.
Jacques Roux	Hébertist leader of the Enragés faction; member of Paris Commune; arrested during Reign of Terror; committed suicide before trial.
== S ==
Marquis de Sade	Author of erotica and philosophy; imprisoned on charges of sodomy and poisoning at the outbreak of the Revolution; released 1790; elected to the National Convention; escaped execution during the Reign of Terror.
Jean Bon Saint-André	Montagnard; Committee of Public Safety member; later became a naval officer and administrator.
Louis Antoine de Saint-Just	Committee of Public Safety member; Montagnard; close associate of Robespierre; prominent in Reign of Terror; guillotined after 9 Thermidor.
Joseph Servan	General; Minister of War.
Abbé Emmanuel Joseph Sieyès	Although a cleric, entered the Estates-General of 1789 as a representative of the Third Estate; author of pamphlet What is the Third Estate?; instigated the 18 Brumaire coup, but outflanked by Bonaparte.
Madame de Staël	Daughter of Jacques Necker; salonière and writer; adopted moderate Revolutionary position; opposed Napoleon.
== T ==
Jean Lambert Tallien	Montagnard; later a leading Thermidorian.
Madame Tallien (Thérésa Tallien, née Teresa Cabarrús)	Her moderating influence on her husband Jean Lambert Tallien saved lives in the wake of 9 Thermidor, earning her the moniker Notre-Dame de Thermidor ("Our Lady of Thermidor").
Charles Maurice de Talleyrand-Périgord ("Talleyrand")	Clergyman and diplomat; initially a royalist, then revolutionary; co-wrote the Declaration of the Rights of Man and of the Citizen and the Civil Constitution of the Clergy; survived 9 Thermidor to become Foreign Minister under Directory, Napoleon, and the Bourbon Restoration.
Gui-Jean-Baptiste Target	Lawyer and politician; deputy of the Third Estate in the Estates-General of 1789; survived Reign of Terror to become Directory politician.
Jean Baptiste Treilhard	Deputy from Paris; held multiple high-ranking offices including Director.	== U ==
== V ==
Pierre Victurnien Vergniaud	Girondist leader; guillotined.
Bertrand Barère de Vieuzac	Girondist, then Montagnard; Committee of Public Safety member; drew up 9 Thermidor report outlawing Robespierre; later a Bonapartist.
Voltaire (François-Marie Arouet)	Enlightenment author and philosopher whose writings influenced Revolutionary thinking.

== See also ==
- Glossary of the French Revolution
- List of historians of the French Revolution
