= Paul Courbis =

French programmer

Paul Courbis de Bridiers de Villemor, aka Paul Courbis (born 3 November 1967), is a French programmer, mostly known for reverse engineering the HP-28 and then the HP 48 series of calculators, and writing multiple articles and books disclosing his findings. These books had a surprising success in France.

Very soon, a team of enthusiasts formed, gathering around Maubert Electronic, a small electronics shop in Paris' Latin Quarter, and developing a large number of utilities and games (one of the most impressing one was Pac-Man for the 48, one of the first programs using the hardware scrolling device of the 48). Most of these programs are still available and can be traced back to the original reverse-engineering published by Paul Courbis.

Paul Courbis was the chief information officer at the French Ordre National des Médecins, he is also working during his spare time on a set of tools to help people administrating Alcatel's PABX (for the 4400 series). He also publishes various tricks (iPhone, shells scripts, etc.) on his web site.

== Bibliography ==
His main books are available as paperprints on Amazon but are still available on-line for free:

- Courbis, Paul; Lalande, Sébastien (2006-06-27) [1989]. Voyage au centre de la HP28c/s (in French) (2 ed.). Paris, France: Editions de la Règle à Calcul. OCLC 636072913. Archived from the original on 2016-08-06.
- Courbis, Paul; Lalande, Sébastien (2006-06-25) [1993]. HP48 Machine Language - A Journey to the Center of the HP 48s/sx. Translated by Cannon, Douglas R. (2nd ed.). Corvallis, Oregon, USA: Grapevine Publications, Inc. OCLC 34148948.
- Courbis, Paul; Lalande, Sébastien (2006-06-25) [1991]. Voyage au centre de la HP48 s/sx. 3.02 (in French) (3rd ed.). Paris, France: Editions Angkor. ISBN 2-87892-003-1. OCLC 29438911.
- Courbis, Paul (2006-06-25) [1993]. Voyage au centre de la HP48 g/gx. 3.05 (in French) (3rd ed.). Paris, France: Editions Angkor. ISBN 2-87892-006-6. OCLC 29640044. Archived from the original on 2016-08-06.
- Courbis, Paul; de Brébisson, Cyrille (March 1994). Le compagnon de Voyage de la HP48 G/GX (in French). Paris, France: Editions Angkor. ISBN 2-87892-007-4. Archived from the original on 2016-08-06.
- Courbis de Bridiers de Villemor, Paul. Dictionnaire des changements de noms - Autorisations par décrets en France - 2010-2020 (in French). Patrice du Puy. ISBN 979-10-90452-40-4.
- Courbis, Paul. "Published articles".

== Other works ==
=== Published works ===
- A HP 48 "emulator/decompiler" running on Unix/X11 and used for automatizing the understanding of the 48G internals;
- Courbis is also the conceptor of the website of the first French computer bookstore on the Internet: "Le Monde en Tique".
- "Alca-Line", a set of tools to help people administrating an Alcatel 4400 PABX (website in construction)
- The "HTTP filtering module" for the "Hybrid Application Layer GateKeeper". Archived from the original on 2007-02-05.
- Some modules for sybtcl: "sp_who" and "sybmon".

=== Unpublished works ===
- An expandable RPL interpreter written in object-oriented C.

== See also ==
- HP-28
- HP 48 series
- Saturn (microprocessor)
