= Companions of Jehu =

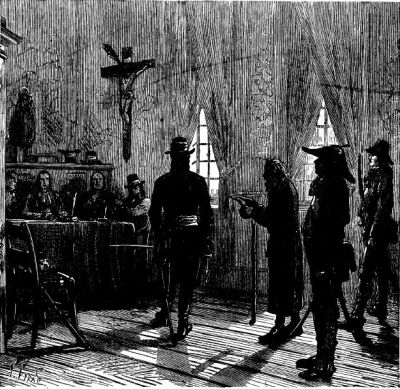
The Companions of Jehu, from an illustration accompanying Alexandre Dumas' novel of the same name

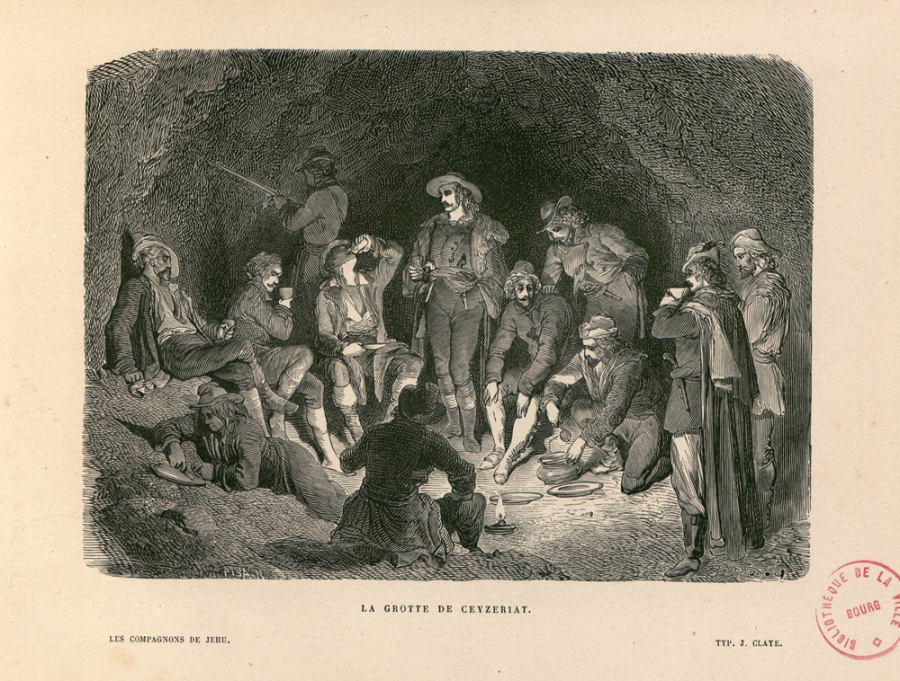
Illustration by Gustav Dore to accompany Alexandre Dumas' novel 'Les compagnons de Jehu'

The Companions of Jehu were formed in the Lyon region of France in April 1795 to hunt down Jacobins implicated in the Reign of Terror. It is possible that they were founded by the Marquis de Besignan, who also founded royalist underground groups in Forez and Dauphiné with the Prince of Condé in 1796. Their victims are believed to have numbered at least in the hundreds. They were made famous by the 1857 novel The Companions of Jehu by Alexandre Dumas which presented a highly romanticised account of them.

== Origins of the name ==
Jehu is an Old Testament character, immortalised in Jean Racine's drama Athalie. Jehu was famous for killing Jezebel by having her thrown out of a window and stomping her to death. According to the Books of Kings, Jezebel was responsible for inciting her husband King Ahab to embrace the cult of Baal and for subjecting the prophets of the God of Israel to religious persecution, including mass murder. She also brought false testimony against Naboth and had him killed. By analogy, Jezebel represented the Jacobin regime, responsible for similarly persecuting the Catholic Church in France and using judicial murder against both real and imagined dissidents through the Reign of Terror. By the same analogy, Jehu was the force of righteous retribution, come to restore the true religion, and kill Jezebel, her children and all those who had turned away from the God of Israel. The reference to Jehu was not universally understood however, and through misunderstanding, uncertain repetition and assimilation with the broader idea of religious restoration, many people referred to the Companions of Jesus instead of the Companions of Jehu, despite this name being essentially meaningless, as was pointed out by Louis Blanc.

The first reference to their existence appears in the records of the National Convention in a report presented on 25 June 1795 from Marie-Joseph Chénier on the recent killings in Lyons. His account says:

An association of traitors has been organised at Lyon, banded together for the purpose of murder. This company, mixing together religious ideas with massacres, the call for royalism with words of justice and humanity, is known as the 'Companions of Jesus'. It is this company which is spreading a new terror in this commune, more vigorous and more widespread than Chalier and his bloody accomplices unleashed.

== Activities ==
On 4 May 1795, 99 Jacobin prisoners were massacred in the town prisons by members of the companions. Over the following days the violence became more widespread and more murders took place as Jacobins were drowned, beaten to death and had their throats cut in their own homes or in the streets. The newspapers encouraged the murder of Terrorists and Drinkers of Blood, and a list of people to be targeted, ninety pages long, was published in Lausanne and openly circulated. This phase of the White Terror continued until the army re-established control and various ringleaders were arrested and brought before the criminal court of Isère. The number of victims of the Companions of Jehu is impossible to know, because there is no reliable way of distinguishing between organised murders and more chaotic lynchings.

An order of 23 May 1796 by General Mointchoisy directed that "to prevent the assassinations committed by the Companions of Jesus, it is forbidden to all citizens under any pretext whatsoever to carry swordsticks, throwing sticks, or batons weighted with lead or iron."

== Questions over their existence ==
Some historians, including Jacques Godechot, have argued that the Companions of Jehu never actually existed. According to Lenotre, the Directory sought to identify and punish royalists, emigres and refractory priests, and actively looked for people associated with the Companions of Jehu. However although various criminals were arrested, none of them was a priest, emigre or royalist. All those arrested for murder and other serious crimes had been acting independently and there was no organised movement or any coordination between them. The tribunal, under Legris, concluded that there were no registers or membership lists for the Companions of Jehu. Later, under Louis XVIII, many royalists who had played very minor parts in resisting the revolution received pensions or decorations, but nobody ever came forward and claimed to have been a member of the Company of Jehu.

== Les Compagnies du Soleil ==
While the Companions of Jehu were organised in and around Lyon, a similar group known as 'les Compagnies du Soleil' (The Companions of the Sun) formed and was active in Provence and Gard. The company's members considered it a sign of strength to carry the symbol of a splash of blood on their hands. During the White Terror a group of Jacobins was able to take control of the city of Toulon from 17 to 23 May 1795, and the Companions of the Sun were particularly associated with the repression and reprisals which took place after the army under General Pactod regained control of the city.

== See also ==
- 1966 TV drama fr:Les Compagnons de Jéhu (mini-série) (in French)
