= Chalier =

Chalier is a surname of French origin. Notable people with the surname include:

- Joseph Chalier (1747–1793), French lawyer
- Xavier Chalier (born 1974), French footballer

== See also ==
- French ship Chalier (1794)
