= First White Terror =

1795 wave of counter-revolutionary attacks in France

- Part of the French Revolution
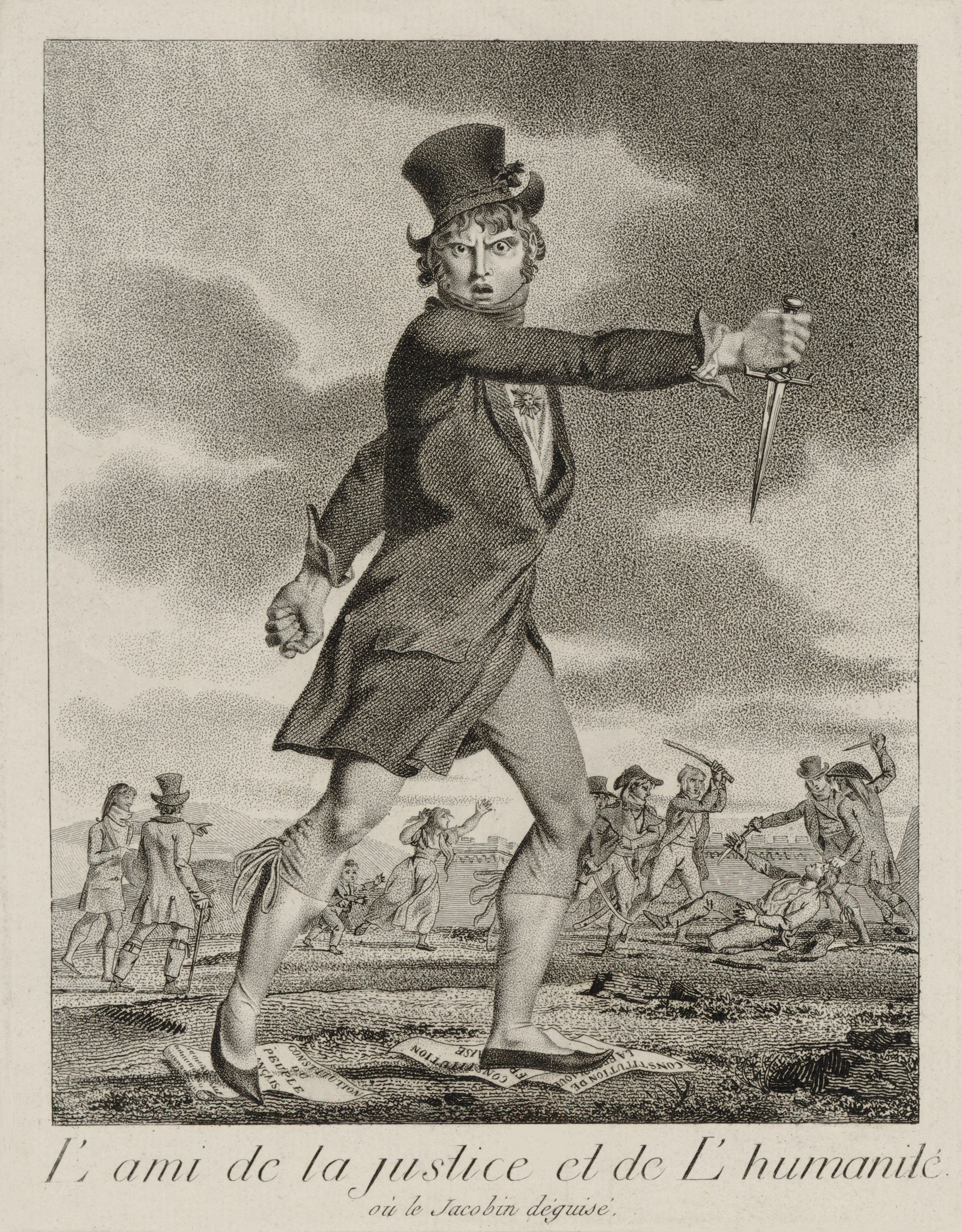
- Picture by an unknown artist showing a member of the 'Compagnons du Soleil', who carried out White Terror attacks in southeastern France
- Location: Southern France
- Date: 1795
- Deaths: several hundreds
- Perpetrators: Muscadins, Girondins, Monarchists
- Motive: Anti-Jacobinism, revenge for the Reign of Terror

The White Terror (French: Terreur Blanche) was a period during the French Revolution in 1795 when a wave of violent attacks swept across much of France. The victims of this violence were people identified as being associated with the Reign of Terror – followers of Robespierre and Marat, and members of local Jacobin clubs. The violence was perpetrated primarily by those whose relatives or associates had been victims of the Great Terror, or whose lives and livelihoods had been threatened by the government and its supporters before the Thermidorian Reaction. Principally, these were, in Paris, the Muscadins, and in the countryside, monarchists, supporters of the Girondins, those who opposed the Civil Constitution of the Clergy and those otherwise hostile to the Jacobin political agenda.

The Great Terror had been largely an organised political programme, based on laws such as the Law of 22 Prairial, and enacted through official institutions such as the Revolutionary Tribunal, but the White Terror was essentially a series of uncoordinated attacks by local activists who shared common perspectives but no central organization. In particular locations, there were, however, more organized counter-revolutionary movements, such as the Companions of Jehu in Lyon and the Companions of the Sun in Provence. The name 'White Terror' derives from the white cockades worn in the hats of royalists.

== Background ==
The Reign of Terror ended on 9 Thermidor Year II (27 July 1794) when Robespierre and his associates were overthrown. However, there was not an immediate reaction to his rule, and for many months, an unstable political climate prevailed before a new order emerged. In Paris, there were increasing attacks on sans-culottes by Muscadins, and there were attacks on Jacobins in Lyon and Nimes in February 1795. However, only when a number of conditions changed did anti-Jacobin forces feel sufficiently confident to escalate these attacks into a full-scale White Terror.

Politically, the Thermidorian Reaction did not remove from power all those who had been involved in the Reign of Terror – indeed, some of the most feared terrorists, including Jean-Baptiste Carrier and Joseph Fouché had been involved in overthrowing Robespierre, largely because they feared him calling them to account. It took a period of several months before all of the leading figures associated with the Reign of Terror were brought to trial or removed from power.

Economically, there were food shortages as a result of a hard winter in 1794–5, and the assignat currency collapsed. The harvest of 1794 was poor, particularly in the areas which supplied Paris, and in many northern areas, people were reduced to consuming seed during the winter. Further south, rivers remained iced over and roads remained impassable in the spring, hindering trade and raising local prices. The assignat fell from 31% of its face value in August 1794 to 24% in November, 17% in February, and 8% in April 1795. In Paris, hunger and desperation led to the Germinal uprising of April 1795.

Militarily, the National Convention was fighting the Chouannerie rebellion in western France until December 1794. The Treaty of La Jaunaye which ended the rebellion allowed the return of non-juring priests. The agreement ended the direct military emergency facing the Republic and weakened the standing of the Civil Constitution of the Clergy.

== Timeline of events leading to the White Terror ==
(source)

- 1 August 1794 – Arrest of Fouquier-Tinville. The Convention repeals the Law of 22 Prairial
- 3 September 1794 – Arrest of Jean-Baptiste Carrier
- 8 September 1794 – The Revolutionary Tribunal begins to hear the case of the 94 Nantes Federalists. The accused made a very powerful appeal to public opinion by recounting in horrific detail the Terror in their city under Carrier. This trial was critical in hardening public opinion against the Jacobins.
- 16 October – The Convention bans any correspondence and affiliations between clubs, effectively outlawing the nationwide network of Jacobin clubs.
- 17 October 1794 – The trial of the 94 Nantais ends with their acquittal and new accusations are brought against Carrier.
- 12 November 1794 – Following attacks by Muscadins who stone men and whip women, the Jacobin Club is closed by the Committee of General Security because it was a focus on violence
- 8 December 1794 – The Convention invites Girondin deputies excluded since 3 June to take their places again
- 16 December 1794 – Jean-Baptiste Carrier executed
- 7 February 1795 – The arrest of noted radical Gracchus Babeuf
- 8 February 1795 – The Convention decides Marat's remains are to be removed from the Pantheon
- 2 March 1795 – The Convention decrees the arrest of Jacobin Barère, Billaud-Varenne, Vadier, and Collot d'Herbois
- 1–2 April 1795 – Germinal uprising of sans-culottes in Paris against hunger and reaction, rapidly suppressed. The Convention imposes martial law in Paris and decides that the arrested Jacobins Barère, Billaud-Varenne, Vadier and Collot-d'Herbois should be deported to Guyana without a trial.
- 5 April 1795 – the Convention issues arrest warrants for a number of left-wing deputies, including Cambon, Levasseur de la Sarthe, Thuriot, and Lecointre.
- 6 April 1795 – The Convention reduces the power of the Revolutionary Tribunal
- 10 April 1795 – The Convention passes a decree ordering the disarming of everyone involved in the Reign of Terror
- 7 May 1795 – Fouquier-Tinville guillotined together with other associated with the Revolutionary Tribunal: Lanne (judge); Renaudin (juror), Leroy (juror), Foucault (judge); Vilate (juror); Scellier (Vice-chairman of the Revolutionary Court), Garnier-Launay (judge); Prieur (juror), Chatelet (juror), Girard (juror); Boyaval; Trey; Verney, and Dupaumier.

== Timeline of events in the White Terror ==
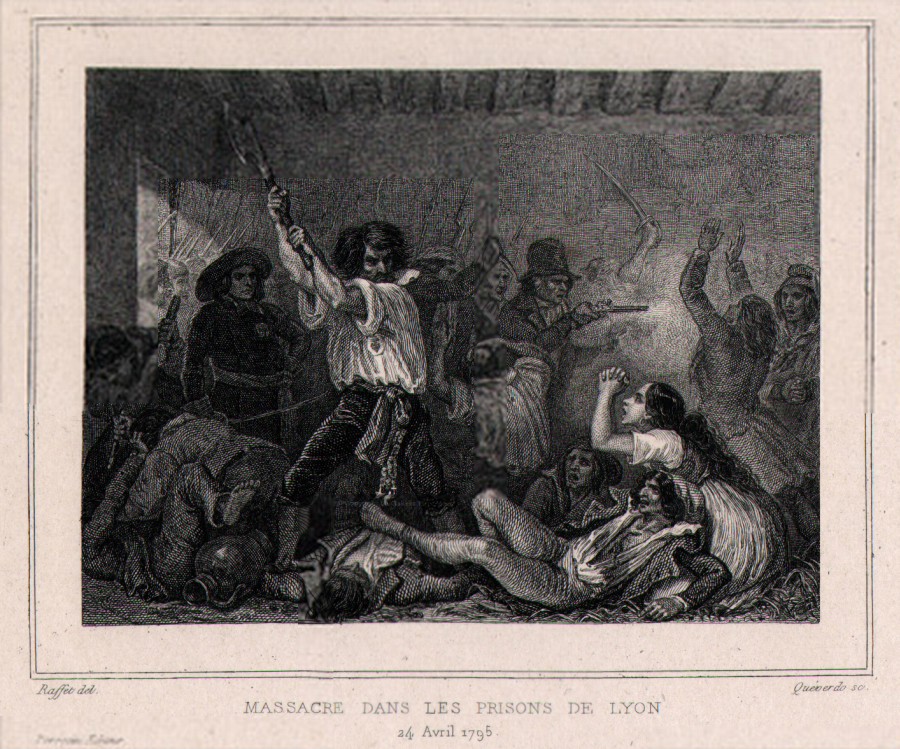
Massacre of Jacobin prisoners in Lyon in 1795

(source)

- August–October 1794 – Newly freed press allows right-wing papers in Paris to call for revenge on the Jacobins, gave instructions for action and pointed out prominent Terrorist targets. In the provinces, Thermidorian représentants en mission opened the prisons and stirred up calls for revenge on Jacobins – Boisset at Bourg, Goupilleau at Avignon and Auguis and Serre at Marseilles. They broke up local Jacobin committees and imprisoned many associated with them.
- 2 February 1795 – Massacre of Jacobin prisoners at Lyon. On 14 February Joseph Fernex, a judge on the former Revolutionary Committee, in prison since Thermidor, is killed and thrown into the Rhône by a mob. On 1 March another member of the Revolutionary Committee, Sautemouche, is killed. Later in February Jacobin prisoners in Nimes are killed.
- 30 March 1795 – In Lyon, the threat of a massacre of prisoners and other Jacobins is now so great that Boisset orders detainees to be taken away to Roanne and Mâcon Nevertheless, on 4 April several thousand rioters break into three jails in the city and kill 99 Jacobin prisoners.
- 7 April – At St Etienne, the former Jacobin mayor Johannot is killed.
- 19 April 1795 – At Lons le Saunier, six Jacobins who had been arrested and were being taken into the town are killed on the road.
- 11 May – At Aix en Provence thirty Jacobin prisoners are killed. In Nîmes, Jean-Antoine Courbis is killed.
- 20 May 1795 – Prairial uprising of sans-culottes in Paris put down by the army.
- 23 May 1795 – Military Commission to judge Prairial insurgents established. It disarms the sections and pronounces 36 death sentences. Around 1,200 people are imprisoned in Paris, and tens of thousands more in the provinces.
- 25 May – A number of Jacobin prisoners at Tarascon are killed
- 2 June – Twelve Jacobin prisoners killed at St Etienne
- 5 June – At Marseilles, 700 Jacobin prisoners are massacred in the prison of Saint-Jean fort.
- 27 June – Members of the former Revolutionary Tribunal at Orange are killed and thrown into the Rhône.

== Effects in other towns ==
The White Terror spread throughout the country, with some regions claiming not to have been disgraced by the Reign of Terror and others believing that there had to be significant retributions. Individuals accused as terrorists were then put on trial and executed. Overall, the severity of the reactions to the Reign of Terror was dependent on how each region was involved in the Revolution and on that region's specific history. Lists of those persecuted, as well as existing judicial and police records, indicate that a strong majority of accusations made did not arise from actions during the Reign of Terror at all but rather from personal or regional grudges.

- In the department of Pyrenees-Orientales, records state that after Thermidor, there were no terrorists residing there. They boasted of not having been "disgraced" by either the Terror or the Reaction.
- In the small village of Velleron the Vaucluse, with a population of about 900 people, quite a few of its citizens had been wrongfully convicted and executed in the Reign of Terror. Many of the people who brought these charges were their fellow citizens. Many of the accused were eventually persecuted or sent to the guillotine. After the Reign of Terror, from 1796 to 1797, the families that had been the victims of these arrests led a "reaction" against the accusers of the Reign of Terror. The most common methods of persecution against the accused during the White Terror were either arson or murder. Judicial records indicate about 9 convictions of individuals alongside their families.
- In the 8,000 person community of Aubagne there was a large local impact from the Reign of Terror. Primarily from 1795 to 1797, there was a phase of prolonged violence. The town had a large number of revolutionaries, as well as a long history of factional conflict. From 1795 to 1797, the years that are considered the town's "Reaction" to the Reign of Terror, 413 people were imprisoned and eventually executed. Judicial records indicate that the accusations and deaths during the Reign of Terror and the White Terror both followed historical familial struggles and traditional regional struggle patterns.

== See also ==
- White Terror
- Second White Terror
