= Charles de Bouvens =

French pulpit orator

Charles de Bouvens was a French Catholic priest, pulpit orator, and chaplain of Louis XVIII.

== Biography ==
Born at Bourg in 1750, de Bouvens became a priest at a young age. He was appointed vicar general by Joachim François Mamert de Conzié, the Archbishop of Tours.

During the French Revolution, de Bouvens refused to take the oaths imposed by the Civil Constitution of the Clergy, instead fleeing to Germany along with de Conzié. After de Conzié's death near Frankfurt, de Bouvens traveled to London. There, Louis-Hilaire de Conzié, the Bishop of Arras and brother of Joachim de Conzié, had also taken refuge, becoming a spiritual advisor to the future Charles X.

While in London, de Bouvens gave a number of funeral orations for prominent French figures, including Marie Joséphine of Savoy, Louis Antoine, and Henry Essex Edgeworth. His audience included both Louis XVIII and the future Charles X, both living in exile.

In 1815, the Bourbon Restoration allowed de Bouvens to return to France. There he became the chaplain of Louis XVIII, whose funeral oration he gave. He held this post until his retirement in 1828, after which he retained the title of Honorary Chaplain.

The orations of de Bouvens were published individually in Paris in 1814, and a complete edition was published in 1824 under the title Oraisons funebres.

The July Revolution of 1830 drove de Bouvens from France once more, and he died not long after.
