= Jean-Antoine Courbis =

French lawyer and revolutionary

Jean-Antoine Courbis (28 January 1752, Tournon – 11 May 1795, Nîmes) was a French lawyer and revolutionary.

== Life ==
A merchant's son, he was a lawyer to the Parlement of Toulouse and became procurer for the sénéchaussée of Nîmes in 1785. An elector and from 1790 a member of Nîmes' Amis de la Constitution club, he became a municipal officer on 27 March 1791, dominated by revolutionary merchants. Even so, he joined the sans-culottes and in October 1792 joined the Société populaire, mainly made up of textile workers. In November 1792 he was elected procurer-syndic for the district of Nîmes.

In the Federalist revolts in the Midi in June and July 1793, he hid. In September that year the représentants Rovère and Poultier made him mayor of Nîmes and president and member of the committee for revolutionary surveillance for Le Gard. They also offered him the presidency of the criminal tribunal but he refused it.

The rigour with which he pursued the federalists led to his dismissal and arrest on 28 December 1793 at the request of représentant Boisset. Even so, the National Convention reappointed him to his roles at the request of Jean Borie on 11 March the following year.

He led the local Jacobins and - supported by the popular society of Nîmes - violently pursued former federalists, deserters and those who had broken the General maximum law. He also ensured the Gard tribunal was renewed on 15 May 1794 - in it he condemned 17 local figures to death on 19 July 1794, including Jean Valz and all the federalist-era members of the municipal council.

On 7 August 1794 he was dismissed and arrested as a supporter of Robespierre. He remained in prison until the First White Terror. On the night of 11 May 1795, unknown armed men forced the citadel gates and massacred him and two other Jacobins, Jean Allien, the former keeper of the Capucins prison, and Moulin, the former inspector of military transport. Courbis and Allien's bodies were later found in the courtyard and Moulin's in a dungeon.

== Sources ==
- Anne-Marie Duport, « Courbis Jean Antoine », Albert Soboul (dir.), Dictionnaire historique de la Révolution française, Paris, Presses universitaires de France, 1989 (rééd. Quadrige, 2005, p. 306-307)

== Bibliography ==
- (in French) Anne Marie Duport, Terreur et révolution: Nîmes en l'an II, 1793-1794, présentation de Michel Vovelle, J. Touzot, 1987, 397 pages
- (in French) Hippolyte Fajon, Pièces et documents officiels pour servir à l'histoire de la Terreur à Nîmes et dans le département du Gard, Nîmes, Soustelle, 1867
- Michael L. Kennedy, The Jacobin clubs in the French Revolution, 1793-1795, Berghahn Books, 2000, 312 pages, ISBN 1571811869
- Gwynne Lewis, The Second Vendée: The Continuity of Counter-revolution in the Department of the Gard, 1789-1815, Clarendon Press, 1978
- (in French) Albert Mathiez, Girondins et Montagnards, Firmin-Didot, 1930, 305 pages
- (in French) François Rouvière, Histoire de la Révolution Française dans le Département du Gard, 3 volumes, A. Catélan, 1887-1889
