= Glossary of the French Revolution =

This glossary of the French Revolution generally does not explicate names of individual people or their political associations; those can be found in List of people associated with the French Revolution.

The terminology routinely used in discussing the French Revolution can be confusing. The same political faction may be referred to by different historians (or by the same historian in different contexts) by different names. During much of the revolutionary period, the French used a newly invented calendar that fell into complete disuse after the revolutionary era. Different legislative bodies had rather similar names, not always translated uniformly into English.

== The three estates ==
The estates of the realm in ancien régime France were:

- First Estate (Premièr État, le clergé ) – The clergy, both high (generally siding with the nobility, and it often was recruited amongst its younger sons) and low.
- Second Estate (Second État, la noblesse ) – The nobility. Technically, but not usually of much relevance, the Second Estate also included the Royal Family.
- Third Estate (Tiers État) – Everyone not included in the First or Second Estate. At times this term refers specifically to the bourgeoisie, the middle class, but the Third Estate also included the sans-culottes, the labouring class. Also included in the Third Estate were lawyers, merchants, and government officials.

Fourth Estate is a term with two relevant meanings: on the one hand, the generally unrepresented poor, nominally part of the Third Estate; on the other, the press, as a fourth powerful entity in addition to the three estates of the realm.

== Social classes ==
- Royalty – House of Bourbon. Later House of Bonaparte after the Empire was established.
- Nobility (noblesse) – Those with explicit noble title. These are traditionally divided into
  - noblesse d'épée ("nobility of the sword"), the hereditary gentry and nobility who originally had to perform military service in exchange for their titles.
  - noblesse de robe ("nobility of the gown"), the magisterial class that administered royal justice and civil government, often referring to those who earned a title of nobility through generations of long periods of public service (bureaucrats and civil servants) or bought it (rich merchants).
  - noblesse de cloche ("nobility of the bell"), mayors and aldermen of certain cities under royal charter were considered gentry. Some mayors and aldermen held a noble title for life after a long period of service in office.
  - Noblesse de race, ("Nobility through breeding"), The "old" nobility, who inherited their titles from time immemorial.
  - Noblesse d’extraction, Nobility of seize-quartiers ("sixteen Quarterings"); having pure noble or gentle ancestry for four generations.
  - Noblesse de lettres ("Nobility through letters patent"), The "new" nobility, from after circa 1400 AD.
- Ci-devant nobility (literally "from before"): nobility of the ancien régime (the Bourbon kingdom) after it had lost its titles and privileges.
- Bourgeoisie (literally "Suburbanites") – Roughly, the non-noble wealthy and the middle classes: typically merchants, investors, and professionals such as doctors and lawyers. The dwellers in the small bourgs ("walled towns and communities") outside the city.

== Constitutions ==
- Liberal monarchical constitution – Adopted 6 October 1789, accepted by the King 14 July 1790.
- The Constitution of 1791 or Constitution of 3 September 1791 – Establishes a limited monarchy and the Legislative Assembly.
- The Constitution of 1793, Constitution of 24 June 1793 (Acte constitutionnel du 24 juin 1793, or Montagnard Constitution (Constitution montagnarde) – Ratified, but never applied, due to the suspension of all ordinary legality 10 October 1793.
- The Constitution of the Year III, Constitution of 22 August 1795, Constitution of the Year III, or Constitution of 5 Fructidor – Establishes the Directory.
- The Constitution of the Year VIII – Adopted 24 December 1799, establishes the Consulate.
- The Constitution of the Year X – Establishes a revised Consulate, with Napoleon as First Consul for Life.
- The Constitution of the Year XII – Establishes Bonaparte's First Empire.

== Governmental structures ==
In roughly chronological order:

- The ancien régime – The absolute monarchy under the Bourbon kings, generally considered to end some time between the meeting of the Estates-General on 5 May 1789, and the liberal monarchical constitution of 6 October 1789.
- Parlements – Royal Law courts in Paris and most provinces under the ancien régime.
- The Estates-General, also known as States-General (Etats-Généraux) – The traditional tricameral legislature of the ancien régime, which had fallen into disuse since 1614. The convention of the Estates-General of 1789 is one of the events that led to the French Revolution. The Estates General, as such, met 5–6 May 1789, but reached an impasse because the Third Estate refused to continue to participate in this structure. The other two estates continued to meet in this form for several more weeks.
- The Communes – The body formed 11 May 1789, by the Third Estate after seceding from the Estates General. On 12 June 1789, the Communes invited the other orders to join them: some clergy did so the following day.
- The National Assembly (Assemblée Nationale) – Declared 17 June 1789, by the Communes. The clergy joined them June 19. This was soon reconstituted as...
- The National Constituent Assembly (Assemblée nationale constituante); also loosely referred to as the National Assembly – From 9 July 1789 to 30 September 1791, this was both the governing and the constitution–drafting body of France. It dissolved itself in favour of:
- The Legislative Assembly (Assemblée Legislative) – From 1 October 1791, to September 1792, the Legislative Assembly, elected by voters with property qualifications, governed France under a constitutional monarchy, but with the removal of the king's veto power on 11 July 1792, was a republic in all but name, and became even more so after the subsequent arrest of the Royal Family.
- The Paris Commune – During the waning days of the Legislative Assembly and the fall of the Monarchy, the municipal government of Paris functioned, at times, in the capacity of a national government, as a rival, a goad, or a bully to the Legislative Assembly.
  - Further, the Sections were directly democratic mass assemblies in Paris during the first four years of the Revolution.
- The Provisional Executive Committee – Headed by Georges Danton, this also functioned in August–September 1792 as a rival claimant to national power.
- The National Convention, or simply The convention – First met 20 September 1792; two days later, declared a republic. The National Convention after the fall of the Montagnards (27 July 1794) is sometimes referred to as the "Thermidorian Convention". Three committees of the National Convention are particularly worthy of note:
  - The Committee of Public Safety (Comité de salut public) – During the Reign of Terror, this committee was effectively the government of France. After the fall of the Montagnards, the committee continued, but with reduced powers.
  - The Committee of General Security (Comité de sûreté générale) – Coordinated the War effort.
  - The Committee of Education (Comité de l'instruction)
  - The Revolutionary Tribunal (Tribunal révolutionaire) instituted in March–October 1793 to prosecute all threats to the revolutionary republic, was the effective agent of the Comité de Salut Public's reign of terror in Paris until its dissolution on 31 May 1795.
- The Directory (Directoire) – From 22 August 1795, the convention was replaced by the Directory, a bicameral legislature that more or less institutionalized the dominance of the bourgeoisie while also enacting a major land reform that was henceforward to place the peasants firmly on the political right. The rightward move was so strong that monarchists actually won the election of 1797 but were stopped from taking power by the coup of 18 Fructidor (4 September 1797), the first time Napoleon played a direct role in government. The Directory continued (politically quite far to the left of its earlier self) until Napoleon took power in his own right, 9 November 1799 (or 18 Brumaire), the date that is generally counted as the end of the French Revolution. The Directory itself was the highest executive organ, comprising five Directors, chosen by the Ancients out of a list elected by the Five Hundred; its legislative was bicameral, consisting of:
  - The Council of Five Hundred (Conseil des Cinq-Cents), or simply the Five Hundred.
  - The Council of Ancients (Conseil des Anciens), or simply the Ancients or the Senate.
- The Consulate (Consulat) – The period of the consulate (December 1799 – December 1804) is only ambiguously part of the revolutionary era. The government was led by three individuals known as Consuls. From the start, Napoleon Bonaparte served as First Consul (Premier Consul) of the Republic. In May 1802, a plebiscite made Bonaparte First Consul for Life. In May 1804 the Empire was declared, bringing the Revolutionary era to a yet more definitive end.
- The tribunat was one of the legislative chambers instituted by the Constitution of year VIII, composed of 100 members nominated by the Senate to discuss the legislative initiatives defended by the government's Orateurs in the presence of the Corps législatif; abolished in 1807

== Political groupings ==
- Royalists or Monarchists – Generally refers specifically to supporters of the Bourbon monarchy and can include both supporters of absolute and constitutional monarchy. See Reactionary.
- Jacobins – strictly, a member of the Jacobin club, but more broadly any revolutionary, particularly the more radical bourgeois elements.
- Feuillants – Members of the Club des Feuillants, result of a split within the Jacobins, who favoured a constitutional monarchy over a republic.
- Republicans – Advocates of a system without a monarch.
- The Gironde – Technically, a group of twelve republican deputies more moderate in their tactics than the Montagnards, though arguably many were no less radical in their beliefs; the term is often applied more broadly to others of similar politics. Members and adherents of the Gironde are variously referred to as "Girondists" ("Girondins") or "Brissotins"
- The Mountain (Montagne) – The radical republican grouping in power during the Reign of Terror; its adherents are typically referred to as "Montagnards".
- Septembriseurs – The Mountain and others (such as Georges Danton) who were on the rise in the period of the September Massacres
- Thermidorians or Thermidoreans – The more moderate (some would say reactionary) grouping that came to power after the fall of the Mountain.
- Society of the Panthéon, also known as Conspiracy of the Equals, and as the Secret Directory – faction centered around François-Noël Babeuf, who continued to hold up a radical Jacobin viewpoint during the period of the Thermidorian reaction.
- Bonapartists – Supporters of Napoleon Bonaparte, especially those who supported his taking on the role of Emperor.
- Émigrés – This term usually refers to those conservatives and members of the elite who left France in the period of increasingly radical revolutionary ascendancy, usually under implied or explicit threat from the Terror. (Generically, it can refer to those who left at other times or for other reasons.) Besides the émigrés having their property taken by the State, relatives of émigrés were also persecuted.

== Ancien régime taxes ==
- Corvée – A royal or seigneurial tax, taken in the form of forced labour. It came in many forms, including compulsory military service and compulsory tillage of fields. Most commonly, the term refers to a royal corvée requiring peasants to maintain the king's roads.
- Gabelle – A tax on salt.
- Taille – A royal tax, in principle pro capita, whose amount was fixed before collecting.
- Tithe – A tax to church.
- Aide – A tax on wine.
- Vingtième – 5 percent direct tax levied on income.
- Capitation – A poll tax.

== Months of the French Revolutionary Calendar ==
- Vendémiaire
- Brumaire
- Frimaire
- Nivôse
- Pluviôse
- Ventôse
- Germinal
- Floréal
- Prairial
- Messidor
- Thermidor
- Fructidor

Under this calendar, the Year I or "Year 1" began 22 September 1792 (the date of the official abolition of the monarchy and the nobility).

== Events commonly known by their Gregorian dates ==
- 14 July – The storming of the Bastille, 14 July 1789. The flashpoint of the revolution.
- 4th of August – The National Constituent Assembly voted to abolish feudalism on 4 August 1789.
- 10th of August – The storming of the Tuileries Palace, 10 August 1792. The effective end of the French monarchy.

== Events commonly known by their Revolutionary dates ==
- 22 Prairial Year II – Passage of a law greatly expanding the power of the Revolutionary Tribunals.
- 9 Thermidor Year II – The fall of the Mountain and the execution of Robespierre and others, 27 July 1794.
- 13 Vendémiaire Year IV – Failed coup and incidence of Napoleon's "whiff of grapeshot", 5 October 1795
- 18 Fructidor Year V – The coup against the monarchist restorationists, 4 September 1797.
- 22 Floréal Year VI – Coup in which 106 left–wing deputies were deprived of their seats, (11 May 1798).
- 30 Prairial Year VII – Coup backed militarily by General Joubert, under which four directors were forced to resign (18 June 1799).
- 18 Brumaire Year VIII – The coup that brought Napoleon to power, establishing the Consulate (9 November 1799).

== War ==
- The First Coalition – the opponents of France 1793 – 1797: Austria, England, Prussia, Sardinia, The Netherlands, and Spain.
- The Second Coalition – the opponents of France 1798 – 1800: Austria, England, Russia, and Turkey.
- The Vendée – Province where peasants revolted against the Revolutionary government in 1793. Fighting continued until 1796.

== Symbols ==
- Tricolour – the flag of the Republic, consisting of three vertical stripes, blue, white, and red.
- Fleur-de-lys – the lily, emblem of the Bourbon monarchy.
- Phrygian cap – symbol of liberty and citizenhood
- "La Marseillaise" – the republican anthem.
- The "Ça ira" – the militant sans–culottes anthem

=== Cockades ===
Cockades (cocardes) were rosettes or ribbons worn as a badge, typically on a hat.

- Tricolour cockade – The symbol of the Revolution (from shortly after the Bastille fell) and later of the republic. Originally formed as a combination of blue and red—the colours of Paris—with the royal white.
- Green cockade – As the "colour of hope", the symbol of the Revolution in its early days, before the adoption of the tricolour.
- White cockade – Bourbon monarchy and French army.
- Black cockade – Primarily, the cockade of the anti–revolutionary aristocracy. Also, earlier, the cockade of the American Revolution.

Other countries and armies at this time typically had their own cockades.

== Religion ==
- Civil Constitution of the Clergy (Constitution civile du clergé) – 1790, confiscated Church lands and turned the Catholic clergy into state employees; those who refused out of loyalty to Rome and tradition were persecuted; those who obeyed were excommunicated; partially reversed by Napoleon's Concordat of 1801.
- Cult of Reason, La Culte de la raison – Official religion at the height of radical Jacobinism in 1793–4.
- "Juror" ("jureur"), Constitutional priest ("constitutionnel") – a priest or other member of the clergy who took the oath required under the Civil Constitution of the Clergy.
- "Non–juror", "refractory priest" ("réfractaire"), "insermenté" – a priest or other member of the clergy who refused to take the oath.

== Other terms ==
- Assignats – notes, bills, and bonds issued as currency 1790–1796, based on the noble lands appropriated by the state.
- Cahier – petition, especially Cahiers de doléances, petition of grievances (literally "of sorrow").
- Declaration of the Rights of Man and of the Citizen (Déclaration des droits de l'homme et du citoyen – 1789; in summary, defined these rights as "liberty, property, security, and resistance to oppression."
- Flight to Varennes – The Royal Family's attempt to flee France June 20–21, 1791.
- The "Great Fear" – Refers to the period of July and August 1789, when peasants sacked the castles of the nobles and burned the documents that recorded their feudal obligations.
- guillotine – name, originating during this period, of an execution-by-decapitation machine.
- Lettre de cachet – Under the ancien régime, a private, sealed royal document that could imprison or exile an individual without recourse to courts of law.
- "Left" and right" – These political terms originated in this era and derived from the seating arrangements in the legislative bodies. The use of the terms is loose and inconsistent, but in this period "right" tends to mean support for monarchical and aristocratic interests and the Roman Catholic religion, or (at the height of revolutionary fervor) for the interests of the bourgeoisie against the masses, while "left" tends to imply opposition to the same, proto-laissez faire free marketeers and proto-communists.
- Terror – in this period, "terror" usually (but not always) refers to State violence, especially the so–called Reign of Terror.
- Reactionary – coined during the revolutionary era to refer to those who opposed the revolution and its principles and sought a Restoration of the monarchy.
- September Massacres – the September 1792 massacres of prisoners perceived to be counter–revolutionary, a disorderly precursor of the Reign of Terror.
- Tricoteuse ("Knitter") - The term for the old ladies who would knit while watching the guillotine executions of enemies of the state. They were spies for the sans-culottes and often whipped up the crowds into a fervor.
