= Mourya Sawant =

Mourya Sawant (died 1912) was a Hindu Ranes leader who led a revolt against the Portuguese Empire in 1912.

Mourya Sawant led an unsuccessful Goan Hindu revolt against Portuguese colonial rule. He was killed in his home while asleep. Portuguese troops reportedly entered secretly, attacked him, and decapitated him. His associate, Jhil Sawant, was captured at the time of Mourya's death.

The Portuguese ruled over Goa for nearly four hundred years. They ruled Goa with a high degree of repression and converted Hindus to Catholicism by force. Many Hindus fled to neighboring territories.
