= Côte d'Azur University =

Public research university in Nice, France

- Université Côte d'Azur
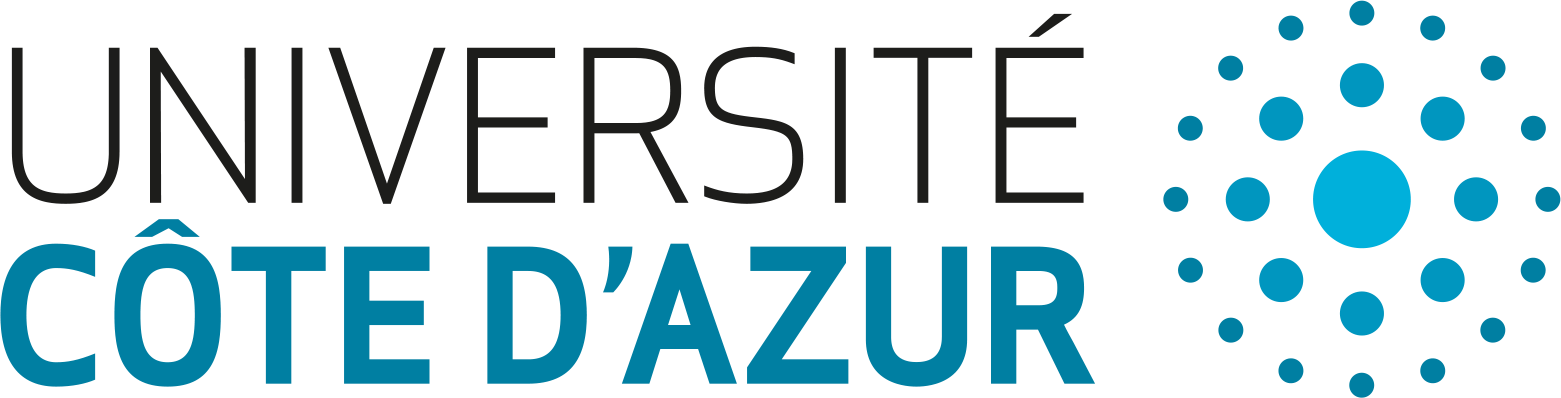
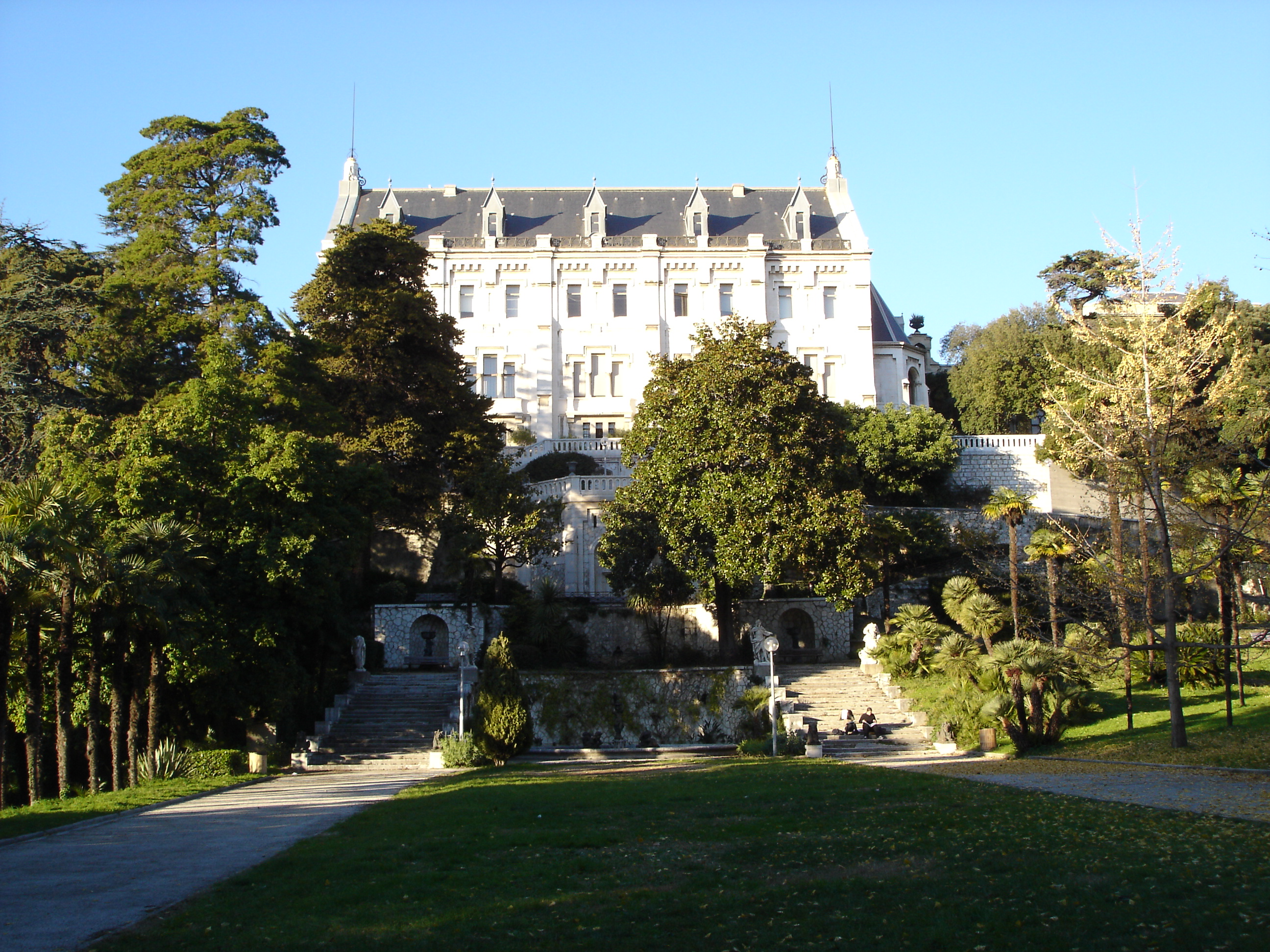
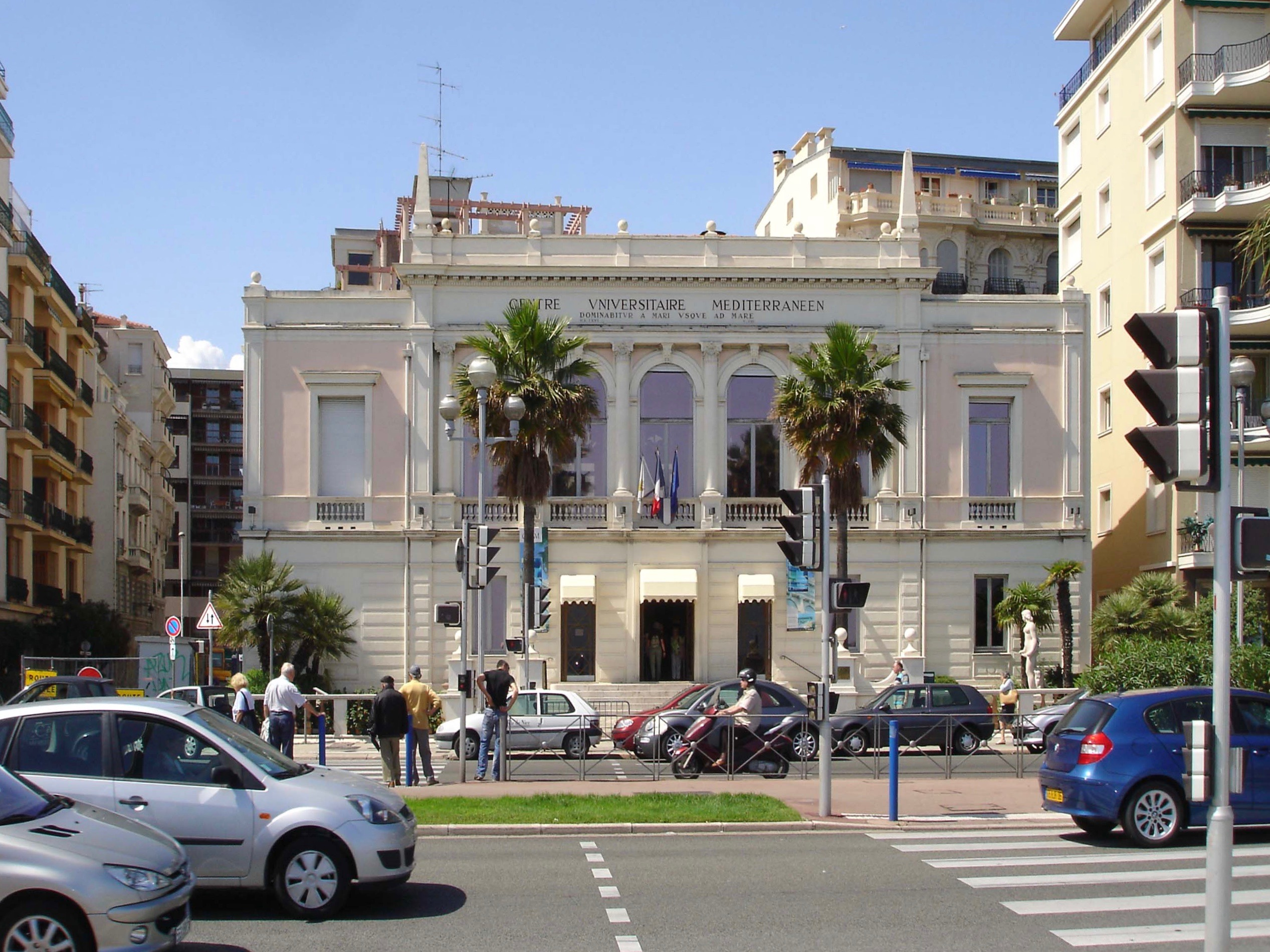
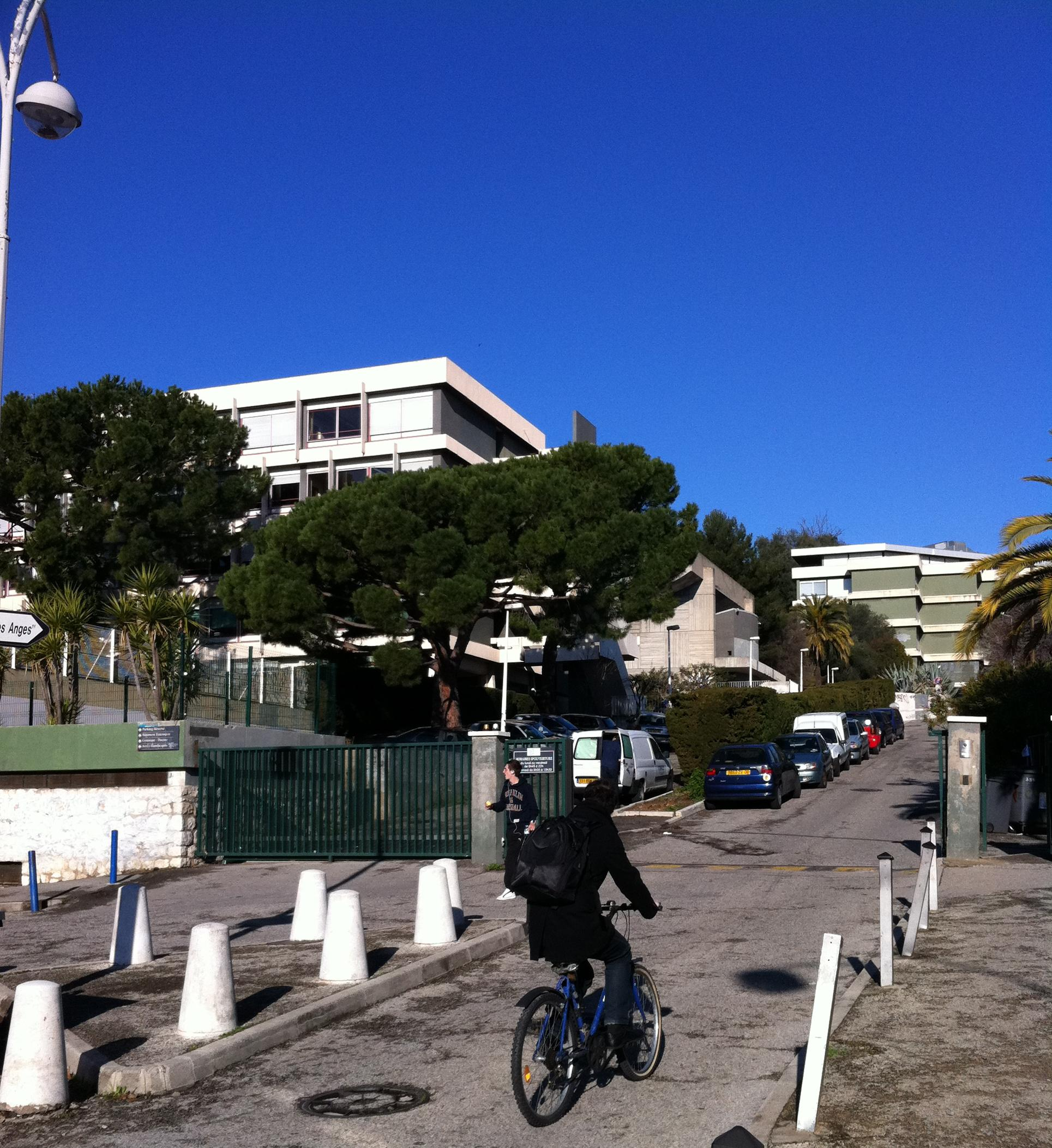
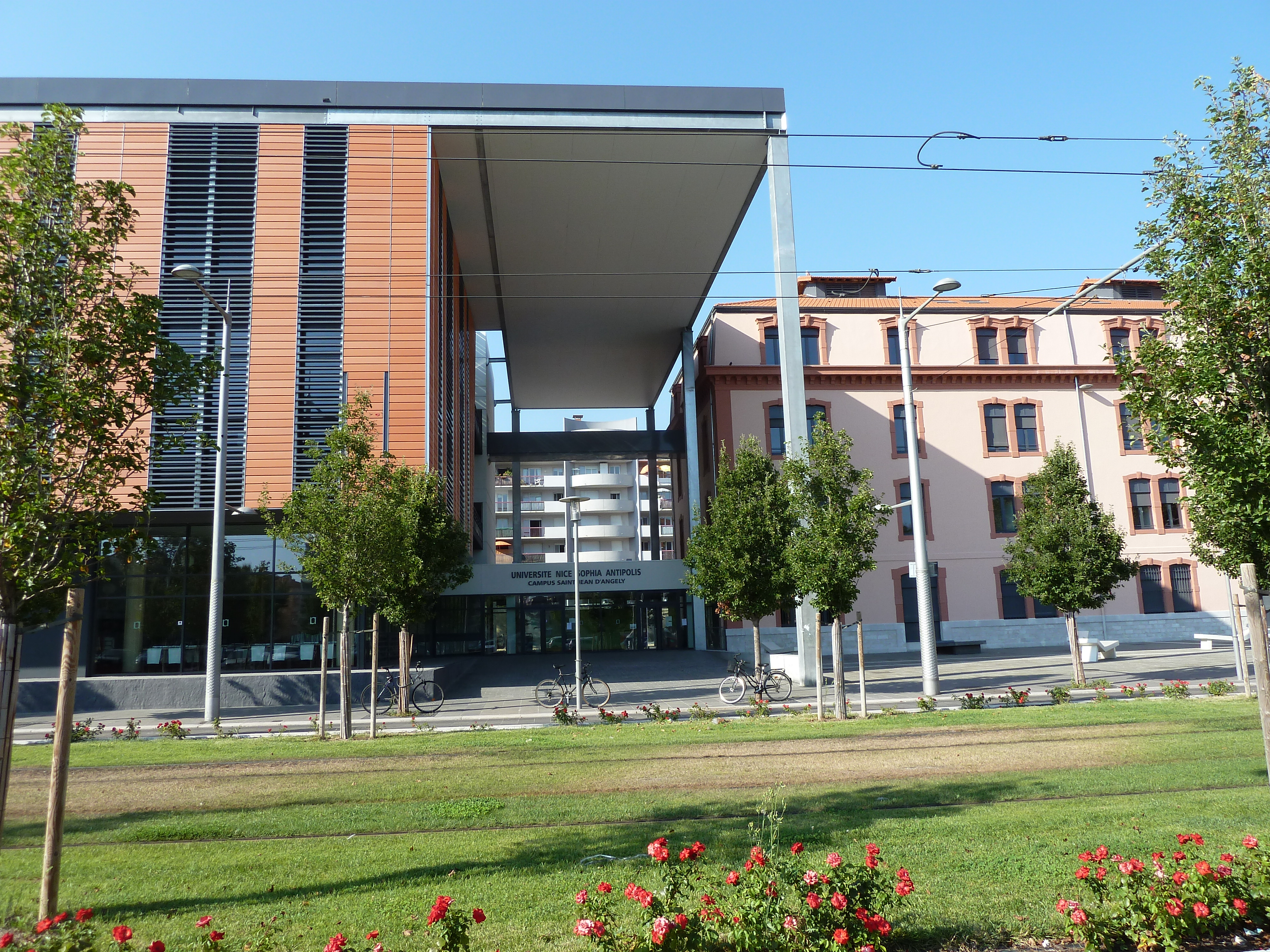
- The "Grand Château" building at UCA's Valrose campus.
- Motto: Dare to create
- Type: Public
- Established: c. 1639 : Collegium jurisconsultorum niciensium October 23, 1965 : University of Nice; July 25, 2019 : University of Côte d'Azur
- Affiliations: Campus Europae
- Endowment: 243 million euros
- President: Jeanick Brisswalter
- Rector: Richard Laganier
- Faculty: 1,575
- Administrative staff: 1,152
- Students: 35,000
- Undergraduates: 12,565
- Postgraduates: 5,146
- Doctoral students: 1,340
- Location: Nice, France
- Campus: Multiple campuses in Alpes-Maritimes (Nice and Cannes)
- Website: www.univ-cotedazur.fr

Côte d'Azur University (French: Université Côte d'Azur) is a grand établissement located in Nice, France, and neighboring areas. In 2019, it replaced the University of Nice Sophia Antipolis and the community (ComUE) that was created in 2013. On 9 January 2020, Jeanick Brisswalter was elected as president of Côte d'Azur University.

The University of Nice Sophia Antipolis was founded in 1965 and organised in eight faculties, two autonomous institutes and one engineering school. It was merged in 2019 into the Côte d'Azur University.

It has nearly 35,000 students in initial and continuing education, including 20% foreign students, and eight University and Research Schools (EUR). Its university campuses are located in several cities of the Alpes-Maritimes department (Nice, Cannes, Grasse, Menton) as well as Sophia Antipolis technology park. It is part of the academic region Provence-Alpes-Côte d'Azur which includes the academies of Aix-Marseille and Nice.

Under the chairmanship of Frédérique Vidal, the university was awarded IDEX for its project called "UCA Jedi" supported by numerous companies. The "University Côte d'Azur Foundation" was created in 2017 to collect donations to finance research projects.

It also hosts the first WWW Interactive Multipurpose Server (WIMS).

== History ==
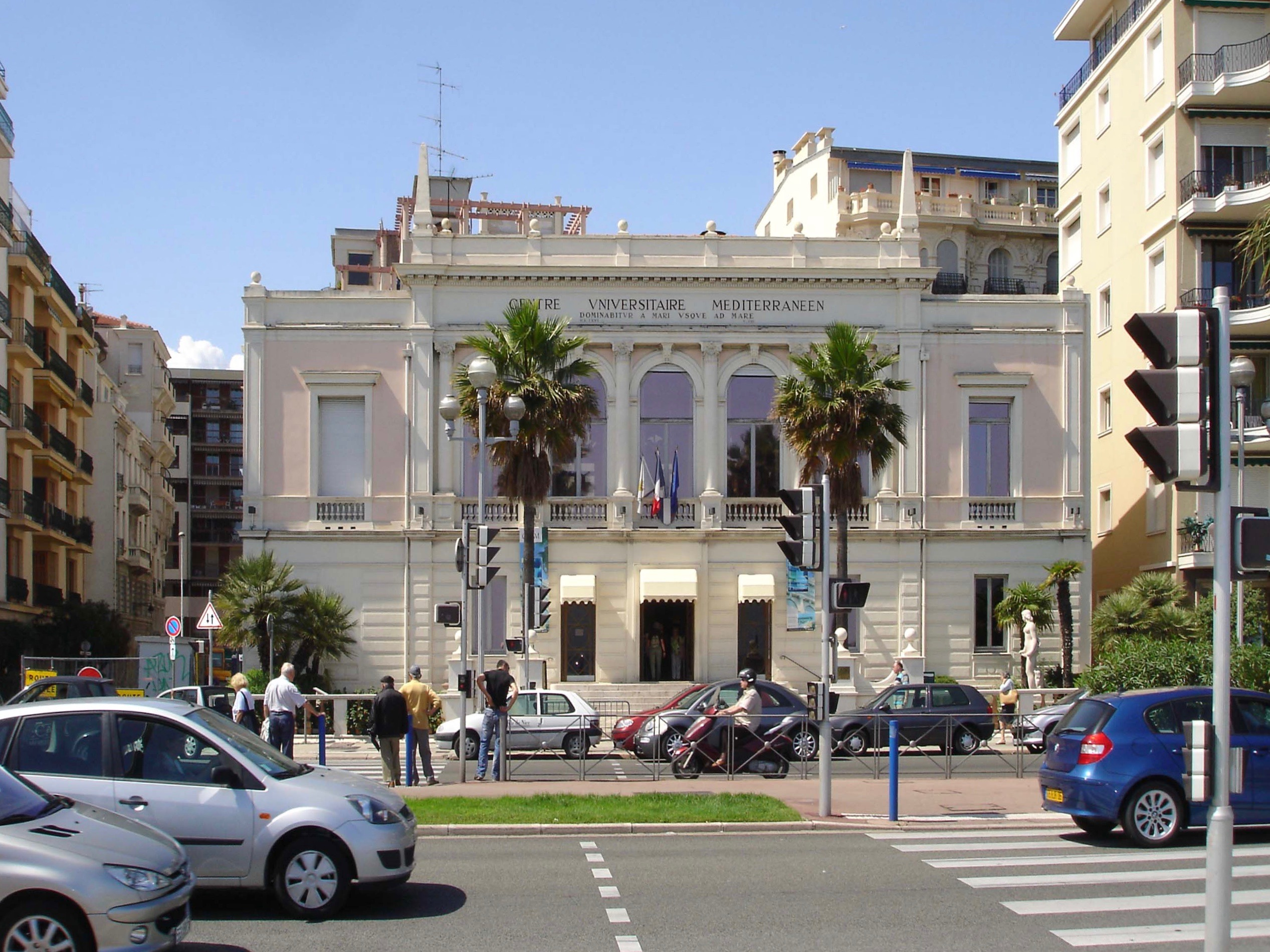
University Center.

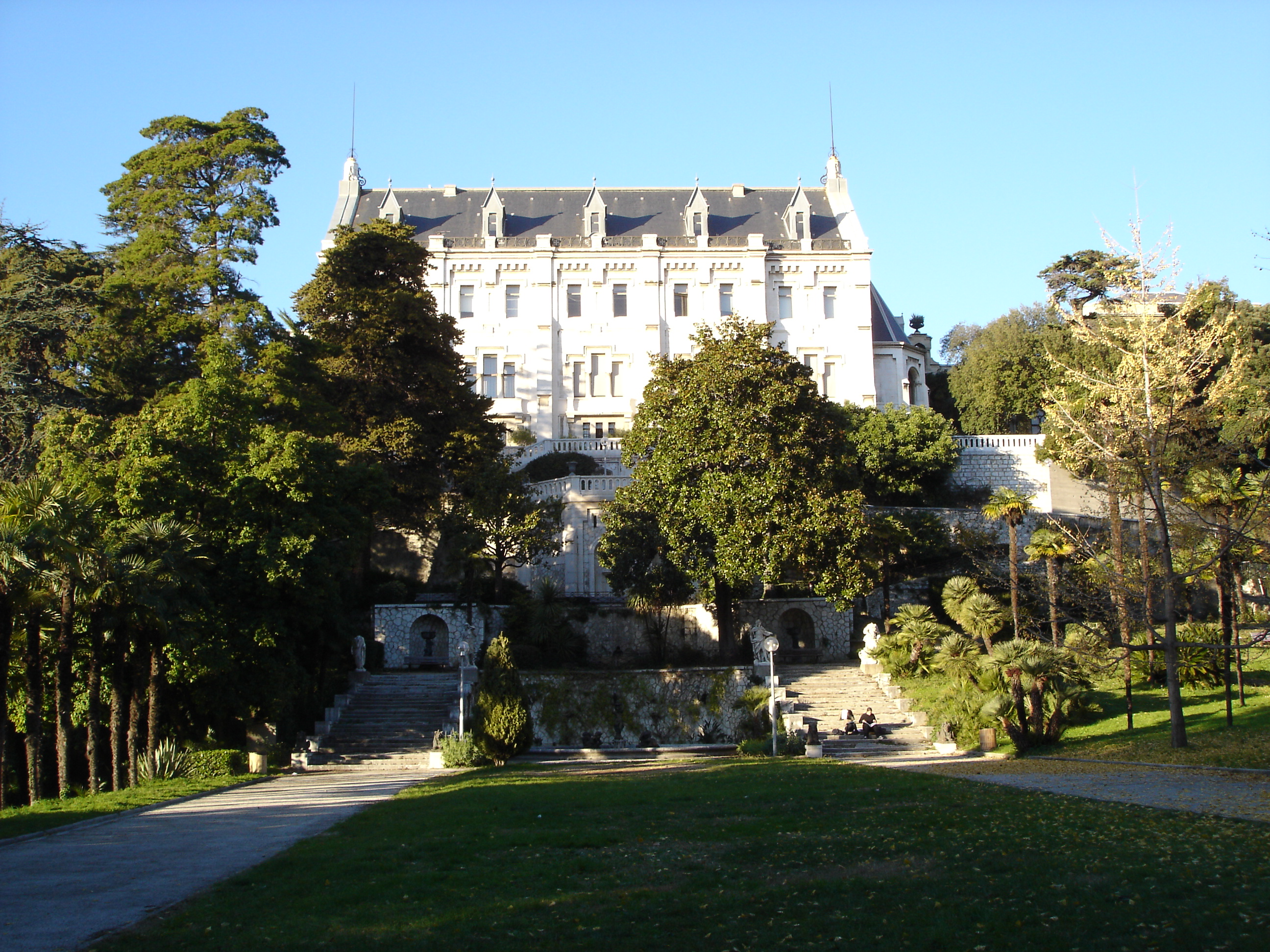
Château de Valrose.

Côte d'Azur University, under the name of University of Nice Sophia Antipolis, was officially established by decree dated October 23, 1965. However, it has roots that go back to the 17th century, with the Collegium Jurisconsultorum Niciensium created in 1639 by the Princes of Savoy. It was composed of a body of jurisconsuls (law consultants and lawyers) and it lasted until Nice was incorporated into France in 1860. In the 17th century, courses were taught at its College of Medicine.

Côte d'Azur University's vocation was asserted at the beginning of the 20th century, thanks to the combined efforts of several university members, such as the Dean Louis Trotabas and Maurice Mignon. In 1933 with the help of local communities and the city of Nice in particular, they created the Centre Universitaire Méditerranéen (currently a conference center) situated on the Promenade des Anglais whose first administrator was the French poet, Paul Valéry. Following that, the Institut d'Etudes Juridiques was established In 1938, the Institut d'Etudes Littéraires in 1941, and the Institut d'Etudes Scientifiques in 1945. La Faculté de Droit et des Sciences Economiques (The College of Law and Economics) was created by decree on August 2, 1962, and was connected to the Aix-Marseille University.

== Campus ==
The university has six main campuses: the Valrose campus (Sciences), the Trotabas campus (Law and Political science ), the Carlone campus (Letters, Arts and Humanities), the Saint-Jean d'Angély campus (Economics and Management - Odontology), the Pasteur campus (Médicine), Polytech Sophia Antipolis (Engineering).

However, the university operates on several secondary locations, like STAPS for sports, or Villefranche-sur-Mer outside Nice, like Cannes, Menton.

University rankings

Global – Overall
- QS World: =688 (2026)

== Academics ==
=== Departments and faculties ===
- Law, Political, Economic and Management Sciences
- Institute of Law, Peace and Development
- Spaces and Cultures
- Letters, Arts and Social sciences
- Medicine
- Odontology
- Sciences
- Sciences and Technology of Physical and Sporting Activities

=== Institutes and graduate schools ===
Côte d'Azur University is organised with graduate schools.

- SPECTRUM: Graduate School Formal, Physical and Engineering Sciences centered around of mathematics, physical sciences, astrophysics, chemistry and earth sciences. It trains around 450 master's level students and 300 doctoral students, it relies on 400 researchers and teacher-researchers spread over 7 renowned laboratories, these themes being recognized in international rankings.
- DS4H : Graduate School Digital Systems for Humans with 300 researchers and professors staff affiliated to laboratories in Computer Science, Electronics and Social Sciences and national research centres (CNRS, Inria), trains more than 250 Master and 250 PhD students in the domains of IT, electronics, digital law and digital economy.
- LIFE & HEALTH SCIENCES : Graduate School centered around biology, biochemistry, pharmacology, molecular genetics and signaling, about 1000 researchers within 82 teams in 9 institutes, in connection with CEA, CNRS, INSERM, INRA.
- HEALTHY : Graduate School Health Science Ecosystems (humanities and social sciences, psychology, sports sciences).
- ELMI : Graduate School of Economics and Management in partnership with Skema Business School
- LEX SOCIETY : Graduate School Law, Political Science and Management.
- CREATES : Graduate School Arts and Humanities.
- ODYSSEE : Graduate School Sciences of Society and the Environment.
- IAE Nice Graduate School of Management IAE Nice
- Institute of the Right of Peace and Development (IDPD)
- University Institute of Technology
- University Polytechnic School - Polytech Nice Sophia
- Centre de la Méditerranée Moderne et Contemporaine, which produces the academic journal Cahiers de la Méditerranée, ISSN 1773-0201
- Observatory of the Côte d'Azur Côte d'Azur Observatory, Nice
- 3IA Côte d'Azur : Institute of Artificial Intelligence is one of 4 artificial intelligence institutes in France, focused on health and digital biology applications on the one hand and smart territories including autonomous and connected vehicles on the other.
- IMREDD : Mediterranean Institute for Risk, Environment and Sustainable Development develops its activities in the field of sustainable development and the Smart City around four Strategic Activity Areas : environment, risks, energy, mobility.

The university's Institute of Languages also provides lectures and summer courses in French to foreign students.

=== Associated institutions of University Côte d'Azur ===
- SKEMA Business School
- EDHEC Business School
- University hospital center of Nice (CHU)
- ESRA Côte d'Azur, Higher school of audiovisual production
- Sustainable Design School
- the Rosella Hightower Cannes dance school
- the Nice Regional Conservatory.

=== National research organizations ===
They contribute to the construction of Côte d'Azur University's strategy, with which they interact in particular in the fields of research, training, innovation, international and territorial relations. These research organizations are:

- National Center for Scientific Research (CNRS)
- National Institute for Research in Computer Science and Automation (INRIA)
- National Research Institute for Agriculture, Food and the Environment (INRAE)
- National Institute of Health and Medical Research (INSERM)
- Development Research Institute (IRD)

== Notable alumni ==
Alphabetically by surname:

- Yukiya Amano - Japanese diplomat, Director General of IAEA
- Robert B. Asprey – American military historian and author
- William Boyd – Scottish novelist writer
- Merieme Chadid – Astronomer and Explorer
- Simon Critchley – English philosopher
- Noah Dana-Picard – Israeli mathematician, professor, and Talmudic scholar
- Driss Dahak – Moroccan diplomat, General Secretary of the Government
- Jean-Lou Justine – parasitologist and zoologist
- Philippe Kahn - mathematician, technology innovator and entrepreneur
- Jean-Marie Gustave Le Clézio – writer, Nobel Prize in Literature
- Philippe Mariani – British entrepreneur
- Zita Martins – Portuguese astrobiologist
- Mohammed VI – King of Morocco
- Tomer Sisley – Israeli humorist, actor, screenwriter, comedian, and film director
- Fatoumata Tambajang – Vice-President of the Gambia
- Gilles Tonelli – Monegasque engineer, diplomat and politician
- Zeine Ould Zeidane – Former Prime Minister of Mauritania
