= Laure Blanc-Féraud =

French image processing researcher (born 1963)

Laure Blanc-Féraud (born 27 August 1963) is a French applied mathematician and image processing researcher specializing in three-dimensional medical imaging. She is a senior scientist for the French National Centre for Scientific Research (CNRS), affiliated with the Laboratoire d'Informatique, Signaux et Systèmes at Côte d'Azur University.

== Education and career ==
Blanc-Féraud earned a master's degree in 1986 at Paris Dauphine University, and a Ph.D. in 1989 at the University of Nice Sophia Antipolis, the predecessor institution to Côte d'Azur University. She earned a habilitation there in 2000.

After working in industry on sonar from 1989 to 1990, she became a researcher for CNRS in 1990.

== Recognition ==
Blanc-Féraud became a knight of the Ordre national du Mérite in 2011, and of the Legion of Honour in 2015.

She won the Prix Michel-Monpetit of the French Academy of Sciences in 2013. She was named a chair holder of the French national Artificial Intelligence Interdisciplinary Institute (3IA) in 2019.

In 2022, Blanc-Féraud was named an IEEE Fellow "for contributions to inverse problems in image processing".
