= Deaths of philosophers =

The documented history of philosophy is often said to begin with the notable death of Socrates. Since that time, there have been many other noteworthy deaths of philosophers.

== List ==
- 495 BC – According to legend, Pythagoras was killed during an attack on the house of Milo led by Cylon of Croton, though this is highly contested.
- 479 BC – Confucius died of natural causes following the loss of his son and favorite disciples.
- 475 BC – Neanthes of Cyzicus reported that Heraclitus died covered in dung after failing to cure himself of dropsy.
- 458 BC – Zeno of Elea, according to Valerius Maximus, was tortured and killed by the tyrant Nearchus of Elea after biting off his ear.
- 435 BC – According to legend, Empedocles leapt to his death into the crater of Mount Etna.
- 420 BC – According to some reports, Protagoras died in a shipwreck.
- c. 400 BC – Siddhartha Gautama (the Buddha) died of food poisoning.
- 399 BC – Socrates, condemned to death for corrupting the young, drank hemlock amongst his friends, as described in Plato's Phaedo.
- 348 BC – Plato either died while being serenaded by a Thracian flute-playing girl, at a wedding feast, or in his sleep.
- 338 BC – According to legend, Isocrates starved himself to death.
- 323 BC – Accounts differ regarding the death of Diogenes of Sinope. He is alleged to have died from eating raw octopus, from being bitten by a dog, and from holding his breath. He left instructions for his corpse to be left outside the city walls as a feast for the animals and birds.
- 322 BC – Aristotle died of stomach disease.
- 320 BC – Ancient sources state that Nicocreon the tyrant had Anaxarchus pounded to death in a mortar with iron pestles; Anaxarchus is said to have made light of the punishment.
- 314 BC – Xenocrates tripped over a bronze pot, hit his head, and died.
- 270 BC – Epicurus died of kidney stones.
- 262 BC – Zeno of Citium tripped and broke his toe and then died from holding his breath.
- 212 BC – Archimedes was murdered by a Roman soldier during the Siege of Syracuse despite orders that he not be harmed.
- 207 BC – Chrysippus is said to have died of laughter after giving wine to his donkey and watching it attempt to eat figs.
- 52 BC – Lucretius is alleged to have killed himself after being driven mad by taking a love potion, although this is debated.
- 43 BC – Cicero was beheaded by two killers, allegedly sent by Mark Antony, while leaving his villa in Formiae.
- 65 AD – Paul the Apostle was beheaded on the orders of Nero.
- 65 AD – Seneca was forced to commit suicide after falling out with Nero.
- 100 AD – John the Apostle died of natural causes.
- 180 – Marcus Aurelius likely died of the Antonine Plague.
- 415 – Hypatia was lynched by a mob of Christians.
- 420 – St. Jerome died naturally in Bethlehem.
- 430 – Saint Augustine died in Hippo while the city was under siege by the Vandals.
- 526 – Boethius was strangled on the orders of the Ostrogoth king Theodoric the Great.
- 1141 – Judah Halevi was killed on a pilgrimage to Jerusalem.
- 1180 – Abraham ibn Daud was martyred.
- 1204 – Maimonides died of exhaustion after extensive traveling.
- 1274 – Thomas Aquinas died of a traumatic brain injury while giving commentary on the Song of Songs.
- 1277 – Pope John XXI (usually identified with the logician Peter of Spain) was killed by the collapse of a roof.
- 1284 – Siger of Brabant was stabbed to death by his clerk.
- 1415 – Jan Hus was executed at the Council of Constance.
- 1487 – John Argyropoulos supposedly died after consuming too much watermelon.
- 1527 – Niccolò Machiavelli died of a stomach ailment.
- 1535 – Thomas More was beheaded in 1535 after he had fallen out of favour with King Henry VIII.
- 1546 – Martin Luther died of Menière's disease.
- 1572 – Girolamo Maggi was executed by strangulation on the orders of a prison captain in Constantinople; Maggi had been incarcerated after being arrested during the Siege of Famagusta.
- 1572 – Peter Ramus was killed in the St. Bartholomew's Day Massacre.
- 1600 – Giordano Bruno was burnt at the stake by the Catholic Church for allegedly committing heresy.
- 1619 – Lucilio Vanini was executed by strangulation by the local authorities of Toulouse, France for allegedly being an atheist and blasphemer.
- 1626 – Francis Bacon died of pneumonia, contracted while stuffing snow into a chicken as an experiment in refrigeration.
- 1640 – Uriel da Costa, after being beaten and trampled by a religious group he had offended, went home and shot himself.
- 1650 – René Descartes died of a cold after rising early to instruct Queen Christina of Sweden.
- 1677 – Baruch Spinoza died of a pulmonary ailment, thought to be either tuberculosis or silicosis, brought on by inhaling glass dust while working as a lens grinder.
- 1683 – Algernon Sidney was executed for treason.
- 1704 – John Locke died of respiratory disease.
- 1716 – Gottfried Wilhelm Leibniz died in Hanover on 14 November 1716 after a prolonged case of arthritis and gout. The only one to attend his funeral was his secretary, Johann Georg von Eckhart.
- 1778 – Jean-Jacques Rousseau died of an apoplectic stroke.
- 1778 – Voltaire died after a five-day journey to Paris to attend the opening of his tragedy Irène.
- 1790 – Benjamin Franklin died of pleurisy.
- 1794 – The Marquis de Condorcet died in prison.
- 1814 – Johann Gottlieb Fichte died of typhus in Berlin, during the campaign against Napoleon.
- 1826 – Thomas Jefferson died of complications from a variety of issues likely stemming from undiagnosed prostate cancer.
- 1831 – Georg Wilhelm Friedrich Hegel died of a gastrointestinal disease during a cholera outbreak in Berlin.
- 1832 – Johann Wolfgang von Goethe died of a heart attack in Weimar.
- 1837 – Giacomo Leopardi died in Naples during a cholera epidemic, perhaps from pulmonary edema.
- 1860 – Arthur Schopenhauer died of pulmonary-respiratory failure
- 1862 – Henry David Thoreau died of tuberculosis.
- 1864 – Ferdinand Lassalle died in a duel.
- 1866 – William Whewell was thrown from his horse and sustained fatal injuries.
- 1873 – John Stuart Mill died of erysipelas in Avignon.
- 1876 – Philipp Mainländer hanged himself in his residence in Offenbach
- 1882 – Ralph Waldo Emerson died of pneumonia.
- 1882 – William Jevons drowned while bathing.
- 1883 – Karl Marx died of bronchitis.
- 1889 – Benno Kerry died as a result of an ear infection.
- 1900 – Friedrich Nietzsche died after 10 years of being in a psychosis-like state.
- 1901 – Paul Rée fell to his death from a mountain.
- 1903 – Otto Weininger committed suicide by shooting himself.
- 1906 – Ludwig Boltzmann hanged himself.
- 1910 – Carlo Michelstaedter committed suicide by shooting himself.
- 1911 – Paul Lafargue committed joint suicide with his wife, Laura.
- 1911 – Steno Tedeschi committed suicide in front of his dying mother, Peppina Tedeschi.
- 1915 – Emil Lask was killed in action as a soldier in World War I.
- 1916 – J. Howard Moore committed suicide by shooting himself.
- 1917 – Adolf Reinach fell outside Diksmuide in Flanders during World War I.
- 1919 – Rosa Luxemburg was murdered by the Freikorps.
- 1924 – Vladimir Lenin died of a brain hemorrhage.
- 1928 – Alexander Bogdanov died as a result of one of his experiments in blood transfusion.
- 1930 – Frank P. Ramsey died after "contracting jaundice" at the age of 26 (jaundice by itself is not a cause of death but instead indicates hemolytic or hepatic disease).
- 1931 – Jacques Herbrand died in a mountaineering accident in the Alps at the age of 23.
- 1934 – Hans Hahn died in 1934 following surgery for a newly diagnosed cancer.
- 1936 – G. K. Chesterton died of congestive heart failure.
- 1936 – Moritz Schlick was murdered by an insane student.
- 1937 – Gustav Shpet was executed after being accused of involvement in an anti-Soviet organization.
- 1937 – Pavel Florensky was executed by the NKVD.
- 1937 – Antonio Gramsci died during his imprisonment by Benito Mussolini.
- 1939 – Stanisław Ignacy Witkiewicz committed suicide by taking an overdose of barbital and trying to slit his wrists a day after the Soviet invasion of Poland; it was planned to be a joint suicide with a close friend of his, but she survived the attempt.
- 1940 – Walter Benjamin committed suicide at the Spanish-French border after attempting to flee from the Nazis.
- 1940 – Leon Trotsky was assassinated in Mexico, along with most of his family, by Soviet agent Ramón Mercader on direct orders from Joseph Stalin.
- 1941 – Henri Bergson died of pneumonia in occupied Paris, which he supposedly contracted after standing in a queue for several hours in order to register as a Jew.
- 1941 – Kurt Grelling was killed by the Nazis.
- 1941 – Edith Stein died in a gas chamber in Auschwitz concentration camp.
- 1942 – Georges Politzer was executed by the Nazis.
- 1943 – Simone Weil starved herself to death (the technical cause of death was tuberculosis, possibly aggravated by malnutrition).
- 1944 – Jean Cavaillès was shot by the Gestapo.
- 1944 – Albert Lautman was shot by the Gestapo.
- 1944 – Marc Bloch was shot by the Gestapo for his work in the French Resistance.
- 1944 – Giovanni Gentile was murdered by communist partisans.
- 1944 – Eugenio Colorni was murdered by a Nazi-Fascist ambush in 1944.
- 1944 – Pilo Albertelli was killed along with 334 other people in the Ardeatine Caves massacre.
- 1944 – Gioacchino Gesmundo was killed along with 334 other people in the Ardeatine Caves massacre.
- 1944 – Paul-Ludwig Landsberg died in Sachsenhausen concentration camp.
- 1945 – Dietrich Bonhoeffer was executed by hanging.
- 1945 – Gerhard Gentzen died of malnutrition while being detained in a Russian prison camp.
- 1944 – Johannes Maria Verweyen died in Bergen-Belsen concentration camp.
- 1945 – Ernst Bergmann committed suicide after the Allied forces captured Leipzig.
- 1945 – Johan Huizinga died in De Steeg where he was being held in detention by the Nazis.
- 1945 – Miki Kiyoshi died in prison; he had been imprisoned after helping a friend on the run from the authorities.
- 1945 – Otto Neurath died of a stroke, suddenly and unexpectedly
- 1948 – Mahatma Gandhi was shot and killed by a Hindu zealot.
- 1951 – Ludwig Wittgenstein died of cancer in Cambridge, three days after his 62nd birthday. His last words: "Tell them I've had a wonderful life."
- 1954 – Alan Turing ate a cyanide-poisoned apple. He was believed at the time to have committed suicide due to chemical depression, but his death was possibly an accident.
- 1960 – Albert Camus died in an automobile accident.
- 1961 – Maurice Merleau-Ponty died of a stroke while preparing a lecture on Descartes.
- 1963 – W. E. B. DuBois died of diphtheria in Ghana.
- 1965 – Malcolm X was assassinated.
- 1968 – Martin Luther King Jr. was assassinated.
- 1969 – Theodor Adorno died of a heart attack after attempting to climb a 3000 meter high mountain.
- 1970 – Bertrand Russell died of the flu in Wales. There was no religious ceremony.
- 1971 – Richard Montague was beaten to death, presumably by a male prostitute.
- 1973 – Amílcar Cabral was assassinated while fighting for the independence of Portuguese colonies in Africa.
- 1977 – Jan Patočka died of an apoplexy after having been interrogated by the Czechoslovak secret police for eleven hours.
- 1977 – Jacques Maritain died in Toulouse.
- 1978 – Kurt Gödel starved himself to death for fear of being poisoned.
- 1979 – Evald Ilyenkov committed suicide.
- 1979 – Nicos Poulantzas committed suicide by jumping out of the twentieth floor of an apartment building.
- 1980 – Roland Barthes was struck in the street by a laundry van after leaving a luncheon with future French President François Mitterrand.
- 1980 – Jean-Paul Sartre, a notorious chainsmoker, died of an edema of the lung.
- 1980 – Gareth Evans died of cancer at the age of 34.
- 1983 – Arthur Koestler committed joint suicide with his third wife, Cynthia, by taking an overdose of drugs following a painful struggle with disease.
- 1984 – Michel Foucault was the first high-profile French personality to die of AIDS.
- 1986 – Simone de Beauvoir died of pneumonia.
- 1989 – Wilfrid Sellars died of complications from long-term alcohol abuse.
- 1990 – Louis Althusser died of a heart attack.
- 1992 – Félix Guattari died of a heart attack.
- 1994 – Paul Feyerabend died of a brain tumour.
- 1994 – David Stove committed suicide by hanging himself following a painful struggle with disease.
- 1994 – Sarah Kofman committed suicide on Nietzsche's birthday.
- 1994 – Guy Debord committed suicide by shooting himself following a painful struggle with polyneuritis.
- 1995 – Gilles Deleuze committed suicide by jumping out of his fourth-story apartment window following years of debilitating respiratory ailments.
- 1996 – Thomas Kuhn died of cancer of the bronchial tubes and throat.
- 1998 – Dimitris Liantinis committed suicide on the mountains of the Taygetus.
- 2000 – Willard Van Orman Quine died of Alzheimer's disease.
- 2000 – Stephan Körner committed joint suicide with his wife, Edith.
- 2001 – David Lewis died of complications from diabetes.
- 2002 – Robert Nozick died of stomach cancer.
- 2002 – John Rawls died of heart failure.
- 2003 – Bernard Williams died of heart failure.
- 2003 – Donald Davidson died of complications following knee replacement surgery.
- 2004 – Jacques Derrida died of pancreatic cancer.
- 2005 – Pope John Paul II died of heart failure from hypotension and circulatory failure from septic shock.
- 2006 – Murray Bookchin died of congestive heart failure.
- 2007 – Richard Rorty died of pancreatic cancer.
- 2007 – André Gorz committed joint suicide with his wife by lethal injection.
- 2008 – David Foster Wallace hanged himself on the back porch of his house in Claremont, California.
- 2009 – G. A. Cohen died of a stroke.
- 2014 – Edward Jonathan Lowe died after several months of illness.
- 2016 – Hilary Putnam died of mesothelioma, a type of cancer.
- 2017 – Anne Dufourmantelle drowned while trying to rescue two children.
- 2017 – Mark Fisher committed suicide by hanging.
- 2019 – Ágnes Heller drowned in Lake Balaton near Balatonalmádi while she was swimming.
- 2020 – Roger Scruton died of lung cancer.
- 2020 – Bernard Stiegler committed suicide.
- 2020 – David Graeber died of necrotic pancreatitis.
- 2022 – Saul Kripke died of pancreatic cancer.
- 2022 – Pope Benedict XVI died from cardiogenic shock.
- 2024 – Daniel Dennett died of interstitial lung disease.
- 2024 – Gustavo Gutiérrez died of pneumonia in a convent.
