= A Companion to Continental Philosophy =

1998 book edited by Simon Critchley and William R. Schroeder

- Author: Simon Critchley and William R. Schroeder
- Cover artist: Giorgio de Chirico, Il grande metafisico, 1917
- Subject: Continental philosophy
- Published: 1998
- Publisher: Wiley-Blackwell
- Pages: 700 pp.
- ISBN: 9780631218500

A Companion to Continental Philosophy is a 1998 book edited by Simon Critchley and William R. Schroeder with 58 essays on Continental philosophy.
