= Noah Dana-Picard =

Israeli mathematician and Talmudic scholar

Noah Thierry Dana-Picard
- נח טיירי דנה-פיקארד
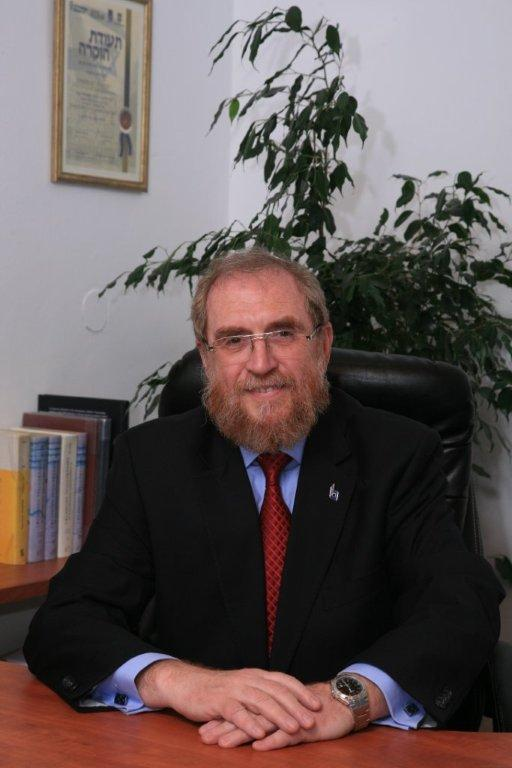
- Dana-Picard in February 2012

President of Jerusalem College of Technology
- In office 2009–2013
- Preceded by: Joseph Bodenheimer
- Succeeded by: Chaim Sukenik

Personal details
- Born: May 6, 1954 (age 72) Nice, France
- Education: University of Nice; Bar Ilan University
- Profession: Mathematician
- Website: ndp.jct.ac.il

Noah Dana-Picard (Hebrew: נואה דנה-פיקארד; born May 6, 1954) is an Israeli mathematician, professor and Talmudic scholar who has been the president of the Jerusalem College of Technology (JCT) since 2009.

== Life ==
Born in France, Dana-Picard holds two PhDs; the first from Nice University, France (1981) and the second from Bar Ilan University in Israel (1990). He is also a Talmudic scholar and speaks four languages.

Dana-Picard has taught at JCT for two decades and published more than 70 scientific articles in algebra, infinitesimal calculus and geometry, as well as many articles in Jewish law, philosophy and the Bible. He is also an expert in technology-based mathematics education.

Dana-Picard believes in contributing to the community and has built his professional career on the synthesis of Jewish studies and higher education. On this topic, he stated that:

My children, my students, and indeed all the students who study at JCT, have been taught that it is a religious value to obtain a full-scale academic and professional education. They know that Jewish history and Jewish values dictate that they must serve the Jewish people and the state of Israel. Their job is to build and strengthen this country, as scientists, engineers, accountants, businessmen, nurses, educators and, at the same time, Torah scholars. JCT teaches this wholesome approach, seeking to imbue its students with the morals and ethics of Jewish tradition alongside expertise in their chosen technological profession.

In addition to his position at JCT, Dana-Picard also sits on the editorial board of two prestigious journals in Europe, The International Journal of Mathematics Education in Science and Technology and The International Journal for Technology in Mathematics Education, and has served as an advisor for several academic institutions in Israel, including the Weizmann Institute of Science and the Haifa University. Besides his academic activities, Dana-Picard is the spiritual leader of his congregation in Jerusalem, and is active there both in education and assistance to new immigrants.

== Published works ==
Th. Dana-Picard, G. Mann and N. Zehavi (2011): From conic intersections to toric intersections: the case of the isoptic curves

Th. Dana-Picard (2007): Motivating constraints of a pedagogy embedded Computer Algebra System, International Journal of Science and Mathematics Education 5 (2), 217-235;

G. Mann, Th. Dana-Picard and N. Zehavi (2007): Technological Discourse on CAS-based Operative Knowledge, International Journal of Technology in Mathematics Education 14 (3), 113-120.

Th. Dana-Picard (2004): Three-fold activities for discovering conceptual connections within the cognitive neighborhood of a mathematical topic, Proceedings of TIME-2004 (ACDCA symposium) in Montreal (Canada), Journal B¨ohm (ed.), CD, bk teachware Schriftenreihe 41, Linz, Austria.

Th. Dana-Picard (2005): Technology assisted discovery of conceptual connections within the cognitive neighborhood of a mathematical topic, Proceedings of CERME 4, M. Bosch (ed), San Feliu de Guixols (Spain).

Th. Dana-Picard and I. Kidron (2006): A pedagogy-embedded Computer Algebra System as an instigator to learn more Mathematics, Proceedings of the ICMI Study 17 Conference, Hanoi, Vietnam, 2006.

Th. Dana-Picard, I. Kidron and D. Zeitoun (2007): Strange 3D plots, Proceedings of the Fifth Congress of the European Society for Research in Mathematics Education, D. Pitta-Pantazi and G. Philipou (edt.) Larnaca, 1379-1388.

Th. Dana-Picard, G. Mann and N. Zehavi (2012): Instrumented techniques and extension of curriculum in Analytic Geometry, Proceedings of ICME-12, Seoul, South Korea, 3796-3804.

Full list of publications: http://ndp.jct.ac.il/publications/home.html
