= IAE Nice =

Institut d'Administration des Entreprises de Nice (IAE Nice)
- Logo of IAE Nice
- Type: Business school
- President: Anis Nassif
- Academic staff: permanent: 33, visiting professors: 110
- Students: 1386
- Location: Nice, France; 43°42′34″N 7°17′23″E
- Campus: Saint Jean d'angély
- Website: iae.unice.fr

The IAE Nice (Institut d'Administration des Entreprises de Nice) is a business school in the South of France, part of Nice University.

It delivers degrees in finance, audit, marketing, wealth management, public management and tourism management.

== Faculty ==
The school is composed of 33 permanent faculty members, and invites more than 110 external speakers each year to conduct lectures and courses within the various programs. It welcomes more than 1000 students every year.

=== MBA program ===
IAE Nice is well known for its MBA programs in Finance and Marketing, one of the first of its kind in France.
