= Zeʼev Lev =

Israeli physicist

Ze'ev Lev
- זאב לב
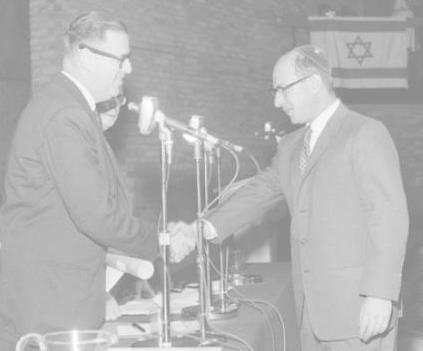
- Lev (right) receiving the Israel Prize in 1962
- Born: William Low; 25 April 1922; Vienna, Austria
- Died: 3 October 2004 (aged 82); Israel
- Citizenship: Israeli
- Awards: Israel Prize (1962)

Ze'ev Lev (Hebrew: זאב לב; born William Low; 25 April 1922 – 3 October 2004) was an Israeli physicist, Torah scholar, and founder of the Jerusalem College of Technology. After being educated in Europe, Canada and the U.S., and having lost his parents and sister in the Holocaust, he became one of Israel's leading scientists and educators.

== Early years ==
Lev was born in Vienna to a Chassidic family. In 1934, his family moved to Berlin. At the age of 16, he was able to leave Germany in order to study at the Gateshead Yeshiva in England, thereby avoiding the fate of all other members of his immediate family.

Having decided to enter the academic world rather than become a rabbi like his grandfather, he obtained a scholarship to Queen's University in Ontario, Canada and graduated with honors. He then received his master's degree and doctorate at Columbia University in New York City, where he studied with Nobel Prize laureate Isidor Isaac Rabi.

With his wife, Dvora Lederer, he moved to Israel in 1950, adopting his grandfather's name, Ze'ev, and changing his last name to Lev. This name, like the Germanic version Low, indicated he was a descendant of the tribe of Levi.

== Work in Israel ==
Lev took a position as a lecturer in paramagnetic resonance at Hebrew University of Jerusalem. He became a worldwide expert in this field, and his research led to the development of microwave and magnetic resonance imaging (MRI) devices.

Later in the 1960s, Lev decided there was a need for a college in Jerusalem that combined scientific study with religious studies. Despite resistance from many rabbis and educators, the institution he started with a dozen students in 1969 grew to have an enrollment of more than 2,000, becoming one of Israel's four accredited engineering schools.

Lev led the development of the Jerusalem College of Technology for ten years, and afterwards continued to do research and academic work. His scientific articles covered subjects including atomic physics and shock waves, and he also wrote about science in relation to the Torah.

== Awards ==
- In 1962, at the age of 40, Lev was awarded the Israel Prize, in exact sciences.

== Legacy ==
The Jerusalem College of Technology has developed special programs for high school students, members of the Israel Defense Forces, ultra-Orthodox women, and members of the Ethiopian immigrant community. Many of its alumni have joined Israeli high-tech firms.

Lev had five children, and after the death of his first wife, he married Sarah Katzburg, who herself was the mother of four children. In his later years he also devoted himself to compiling a family tree of the Lev family. It started with his great-grandfather's life in Poland during the early 19th century and has grown to include approximately 1,000 descendants.

One of his sons, Nahum, became a high-ranking officer in the elite Sayeret Matkal unit, and the first religious officer in that unit. He led the commando operation to assassinate Khalil al-Wazir in Tunis in 1988. Nahum Lev died in a traffic accident in August 2000.

== See also ==
- List of Israel Prize recipients
