= What We Think About When We Think About Football =

2017 book by Simon Critchley

What We Think About When We Think About Soccer
- Author: Simon Critchley
- Language: English
- Subject: Football, phenomenology
- Genre: Philosophy
- Publisher: Penguin Books, Profile Books (UK)
- Publication date: 2017
- Publication place: United States
- Pages: 208
- ISBN: 9780525504603

What We Think When We Think About Football it is a book written by the British philosopher Simon Critchley, published in 2017 by Penguin Books in United States. In United Kingdom the book was published by Profile Books, in the same year.

== Content ==
In What We Think About When We Think About Football, British philosopher and professor by The New School for Social Research, in New York City, Simon Critchley proposes a phenomenological reading of football focused on a “phenomenological” approach to the game and on outlining a “poetics of the soccer experience”, not in terms of tactics or statistics, but in terms of the lived experience of playing, cheering, and watching a match.

The book explores what soccer reveals about memory, history, place, social class, gender, and family, tribal, and national identities, as well as the nature of human groups. For the author, the sport is, in its form, essentially collective and even socialist, yet it exists immersed in a logic of greed, corruption, capitalism, and autocracy; drawing on this tension, he outlines an aesthetic. Throughout the book, Critchley engages with references from continental philosophy, such as Martin Heidegger, Jean-Paul Sartre, Maurice Merleau-Ponty, and Hans-Georg Gadamer, and illustrates his ideas with figures from football universal like Zinedine Zidane, Johan Cruyff, Brian Clough, Don Revie, Bill Shankly, and Jürgen Klopp.

== Reception ==
Alan Pattullo, from The Scotsman, gave a mostly positive review and noted that: “The idea that soccer is much more than just a game is not new, of course. Still, this is a thought-provoking little book that rewards the reader’s perseverance, even if, in some parts, it can be a bit dense.”

Cristovão Feil, from Brazilian online newspaper Brasil de Fato, gave the book a positive review and noted that “One of the book’s central themes is the contradiction inherent in soccer. On the one hand, Critchley argues that the game is ‘essentially collaborative, even socialist,’ a space for collectivity and shared enjoyment. On the other hand, he acknowledges that it exists “wrapped up in a mix of greed, corruption, capitalism, and autocracy.”
