= Continental Philosophy: A Critical Approach =

2005 book by William R. Schroeder

- Author: William R. Schroeder
- Subject: Continental philosophy
- Published: 2005
- Publisher: Wiley-Blackwell
- Pages: 480
- ISBN: 9781557868817

Continental Philosophy: A Critical Approach is a 2005 book by William R. Schroeder in which the author provides an "introduction to the key figures and philosophical movements of the nineteenth and twentieth centuries".

== Reception ==
The book was reviewed by Richard Schacht (University of Illinois), Frithjof Bergmann (University of Michigan), Todd May (Clemson University), Marie Ramoya (Ateneo de Manila University) and Jeffrey M. Jackson.
