= Sartre and His Predecessors =

1984 book by William R. Schroeder

Sartre and his Predecessors: The Self and the Other
- Author: William R. Schroeder
- Subject: Jean-Paul Sartre
- Published: 1984
- Publisher: Routledge & Kegan Paul
- Pages: 326 pp.
- ISBN: 9780710202741

Sartre and his Predecessors: The Self and the Other is a 1984 book by William R. Schroeder, in which the author provides an explanation and critical examination of the thought of Jean-Paul Sartre, Martin Heidegger, Edmund Husserl and Georg Wilhelm Friedrich Hegel.
