= William R. Schroeder =

American philosopher

- Born: William Ralph Schroeder; April 9, 1947; Detroit, Michigan, U.S.
- Died: July 26, 2021 (aged 74); Urbana, Illinois, U.S.

Education
- Education: University of Michigan (Ph.D.)
- Thesis: Others: An Examination of Sartre and His Predecessors (1979)
- Doctoral advisor: Frithjof Bergmann

Philosophical work
- Era: Contemporary philosophy
- Region: Western philosophy
- School: Continental
- Main interests: Phenomenology, existentialism, ethics

William Ralph Schroeder (April 9, 1947 – July 26, 2021) was an American philosopher and emeritus professor of Philosophy at the University of Illinois at Urbana-Champaign. He was known for his expertise in continental philosophy and ethics.

Schroeder authored several books on philosophy, including Continental Philosophy: A Critical Approach and Sartre and His Predecessors: The Self and the Other.

== Books ==
- Sartre and His Predecessors (Routledge & Kegan Paul, 1984)
- A Companion to Continental Philosophy (Blackwell, 1998), co-editor with Simon Critchley
- Continental Philosophy: A Critical Approach (Blackwell, 2005)
