= Zeno of Elea =

Greek philosopher (c. 495 – c. 430 BC)

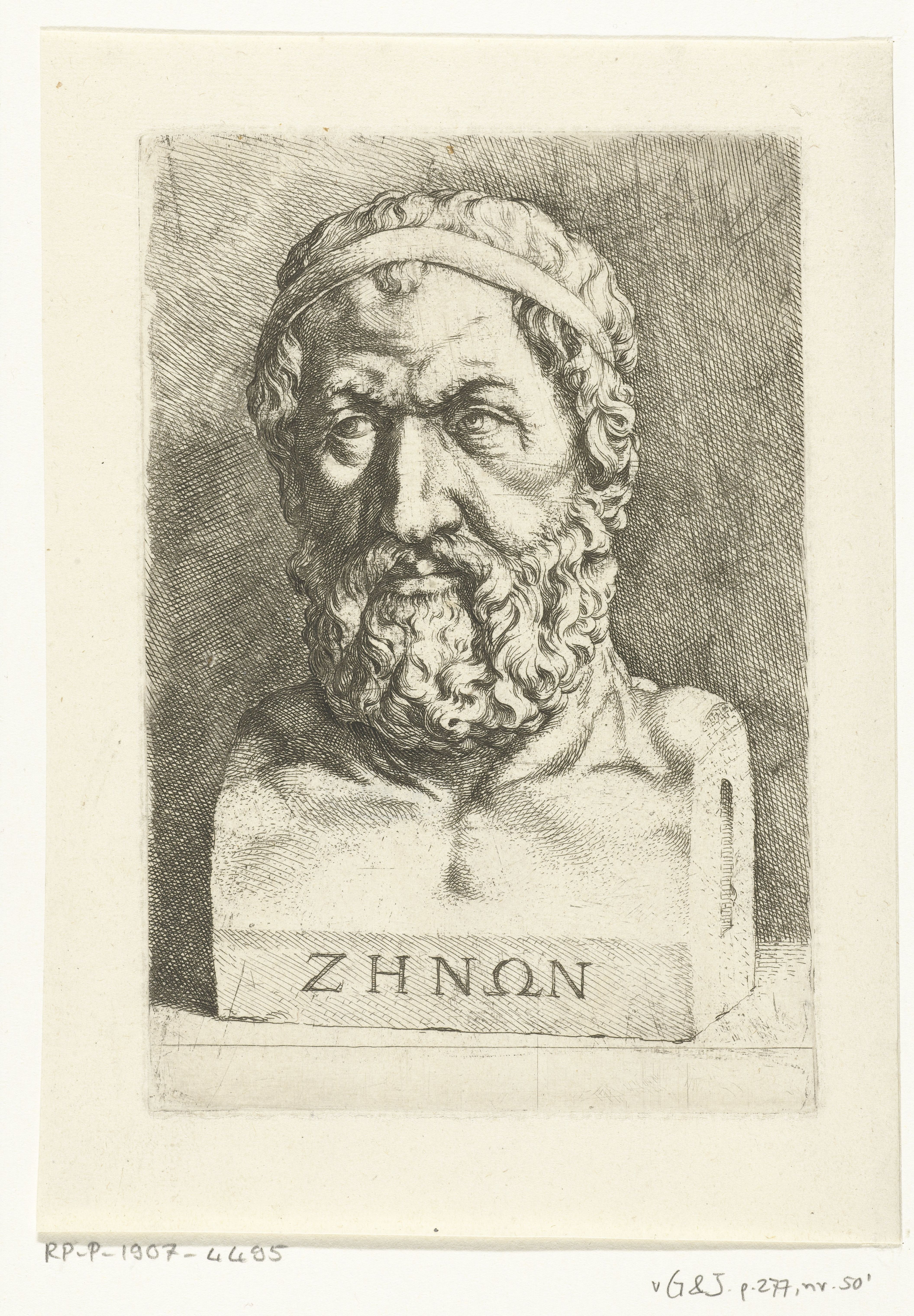
- Portrait of Zeno of Elea by Jan de Bisschop (1628–1671)
- Born: c. 490 BC; Elea
- Died: c. 430 BC (aged around 60); Elea or Syracuse

Philosophical work
- Era: Pre-Socratic philosophy
- Region: Western philosophy
- School: Eleatic
- Main interests: Metaphysics, ontology
- Notable ideas: Zeno's paradoxes

Zeno of Elea (/ˈziːnoʊ ... ˈɛliə/; Ancient Greek: Ζήνων ὁ Ἐλεάτης; c. 490 – c. 430 BC) was a pre-Socratic Greek philosopher from Elea, in what is now Southern Italy (Magna Graecia). He was a student of Parmenides and one of the Eleatics. Zeno defended his instructor's belief in monism, the idea that only one single entity exists that makes up all of reality. He rejected the existence of space, time, and motion. To disprove these concepts, he developed a series of paradoxes to demonstrate why they are impossible. Though his original writings are lost, subsequent descriptions by Plato, Aristotle, Diogenes Laertius, and Simplicius of Cilicia have allowed study of his ideas.

Zeno's arguments are divided into two different types: his arguments against plurality, or the existence of multiple objects, and his arguments against motion. Those against plurality suggest that for anything to exist, it must be divisible infinitely, meaning it would necessarily have both infinite mass and no mass simultaneously. Those against motion invoke the idea that distance must be divisible infinitely, meaning infinite steps would be required to cross any distance.

Zeno's philosophy is still debated in the present day, and no solution to his paradoxes has been agreed upon by philosophers. His paradoxes have influenced philosophy and mathematics, both in ancient and modern times. Many of his ideas have been challenged by modern developments in physics and mathematics, such as atomic theory, mathematical limits, and set theory.

== Life ==
Zeno was born c. 490 BC. Little about his life is known for certain, except that he was from Elea and that he was a student of Parmenides. Zeno is portrayed in the dialogue Parmenides by Plato, which takes place when Zeno is about 40 years old. In Parmenides, Zeno is described as having once been a zealous defender of his instructor Parmenides; this younger Zeno wished to prove that belief in the physical world as it appears is more absurd than belief in the Eleatic idea of a single entity of existence. By the time that Parmenides takes place, Zeno is shown to have matured and to be more content to overlook challenges to his instructor's Eleatic philosophy. Plato also has Socrates hint at a previous romantic or sexual relationship between Parmenides and Zeno. It is unknown how accurate the depiction in Parmenides is to reality, but it is agreed that it bears at least some truth.

Zeno died c. 430 BC. According to Diogenes Laertius, Zeno was killed while he was engaged in a plot to overthrow the tyrant Nearchus. This account tells that he was captured, and that he was killed after he refused to give the names of his co-conspirators. Before his death, Zeno is said to have asked to whisper the names into Nearchus's ear, only to bite the ear when Nearchus approached, holding on until he was killed.

=== Writings ===
The writings of Zeno have been lost; no fragments of his original thoughts exist. Instead, modern understanding of Zeno's philosophy comes through recording by subsequent philosophers. Zeno is only known to have written one book, most likely in the 460s BC. This book is told of in Parmenides, when the character of Zeno describes it as something that he wrote in his youth. According to Plato's account, the book was stolen and published without Zeno's permission. Zeno's paradoxes were recorded by Aristotle in his book Physics. Simplicius of Cilicia, who lived in the 6th century AD, is another one of the main sources of present day knowledge about Zeno.

== Philosophy ==
Zeno is one of three major philosophers in the Eleatic school, along with Parmenides and Melissus of Samos. This school of philosophy was a form of monism, following Parmenides' belief that all of reality is one single indivisible object. Both Zeno and Melissus engaged in philosophy to support the ideas of Parmenides. While Melissus sought to build on them, Zeno instead argued against opposing ideas. Such arguments would have been constructed to challenge the ideas of pluralism, particularly those of the Pythagoreans.

Zeno was the first philosopher to use argumentative rather than descriptive language in his philosophy. Previous philosophers had explained their worldview, but Zeno was the first one to create explicit arguments that were meant to be used for debate. Aristotle described Zeno as the "inventor of dialectic". To disprove opposing views about reality, he wrote a series of paradoxes that used reductio ad absurdum arguments, or arguments that disprove an idea by showing how it leads to illogical conclusions. Furthermore, Zeno's philosophy makes use of infinitesimals, or quantities that are infinitely small while still being greater than zero.

Criticism of Zeno's ideas may accuse him with using rhetorical tricks and sophistry rather than cogent arguments. Critics point to how Zeno describes the attributes of different ideas as absolutes when they may be contextual. He may be accused of comparing similarities between concepts, such as attributes that physical space shared with physical objects, and then assuming that they be identical in other ways.

=== Plurality and space ===
Zeno rejected the idea of plurality, or that more than one thing can exist. According to Proclus, Zeno had forty arguments against plurality.

In one argument, Zeno proposed that multiple objects cannot exist, because this would require everything to be finite and infinite simultaneously. He used this logic to challenge the existence of indivisible atoms. Though the first part of this argument is lost, its main idea is recorded by Simplicius. According to him, Zeno began the argument with the idea that nothing can have size because "each of the many is self-identical and one". Zeno argued that if objects have mass, then they can be divided. The divisions would in turn be divisible, and so on, meaning that no object could have a finite size, as there would always be a smaller part to take from it. Zeno also argued from the other direction: if objects do not have mass, then they cannot be combined to create something larger.

In another argument, Zeno proposed that multiple objects cannot exist, because it would require an infinite number of objects to have a finite number of objects; he held that in order for there to be a finite number of objects, there must be an infinite number of objects dividing them. For two objects to exist separately, according to Zeno, there must be a third thing dividing them, otherwise they would be parts of the same thing. This dividing thing would then itself need two dividing objects to separate it from the original objects. These new dividing objects would then need dividing objects, and so on.

As with all other aspects of existence, Zeno argued that location and physical space are part of the single object that exists as reality. Zeno believed that for all things that exist, they must exist in a certain point in physical space. For a point in space to exist, it must exist in another point in space. This space must in turn exist in another point in space, and so on. Zeno was likely the first philosopher to directly propose that being is incorporeal rather than taking up physical space.

=== Motion and time ===
Zeno's arguments against motion contrast the actual phenomena of happenings and experience with the way that they are described and perceived. The exact wording of these arguments has been lost, but descriptions of them survive through Aristotle in his Physics. Aristotle identified four paradoxes of motion as the most important. Each paradox has multiple names that it is known by.

- The dichotomy, the racetrack, or the stadium argues that no distance can be traveled. To cross a certain distance, one must first cross half of that distance, and to cross that distance, one must first cross half of that distance, and so on. This appears to make crossing any distance impossible, as an infinite number of acts are required to do it. The argument contends that any appearance of movement is simply an illusion. It is unknown whether Zeno intended for it to be impossible to start or finish crossing a certain distance.
- Achilles and the tortoise, or simply Achilles, argues that a swift runner such as Achilles can never catch up to a slow runner, such as a tortoise. Every time Achilles goes to where the tortoise was, the tortoise will have moved ahead, and when Achilles reaches that next point, then the tortoise will have moved ahead again, and so on. This makes it seem that Achilles can never reach the tortoise. The dichotomy and Achilles are two variations of the same argument, and they effectively come to the same conclusions.
- The flying arrow, or simply the arrow, argues that all objects must be motionless in space. If an arrow is in the air, it is stationary at any given instant by occupying a specific area in space.
- The moving rows, also sometimes called the stadium, argues that periods of time can be both halved and doubled simultaneously. It describes a row of objects passing beside other rows of objects in a stadium. If one of the opposing rows is stationary and the other is moving, then it will take a different amount of time to pass them.
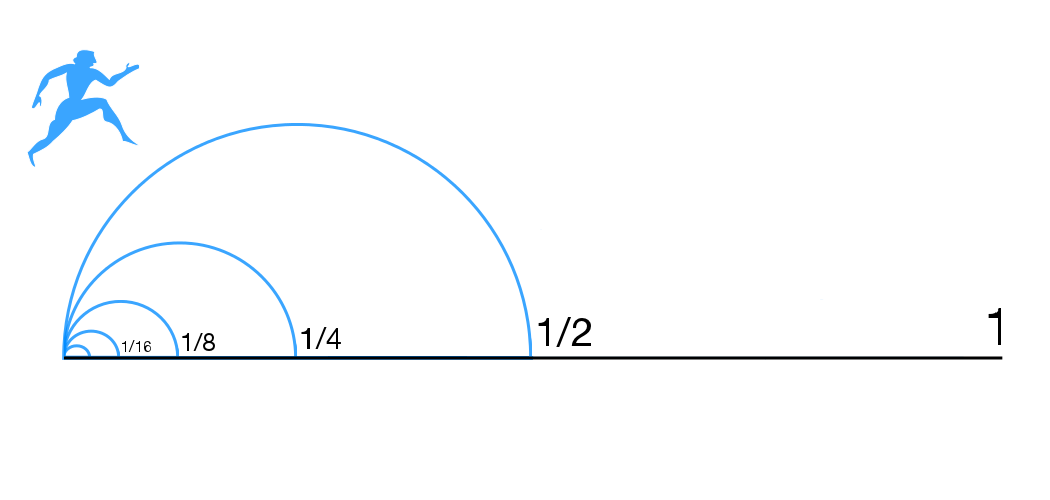
The dichotomy

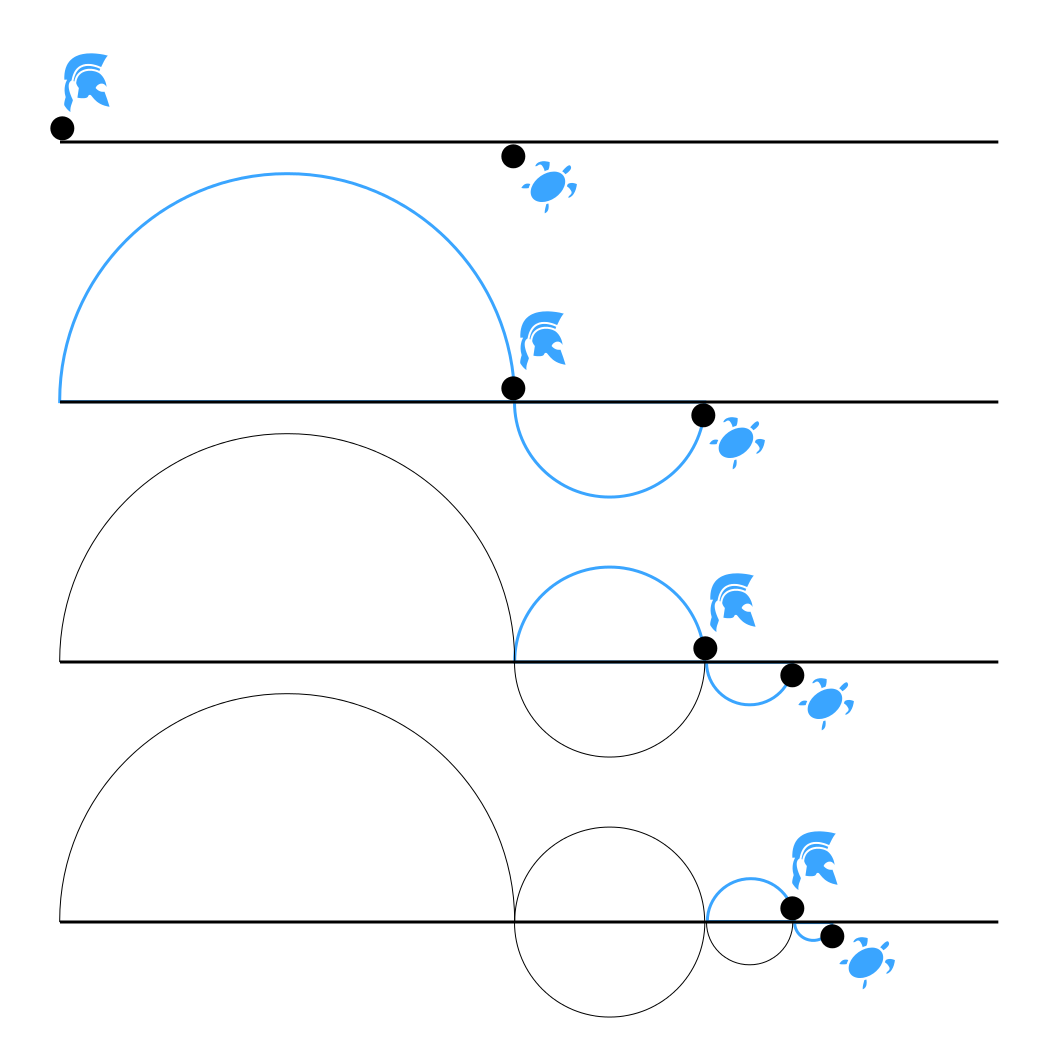
Achilles and the tortoise

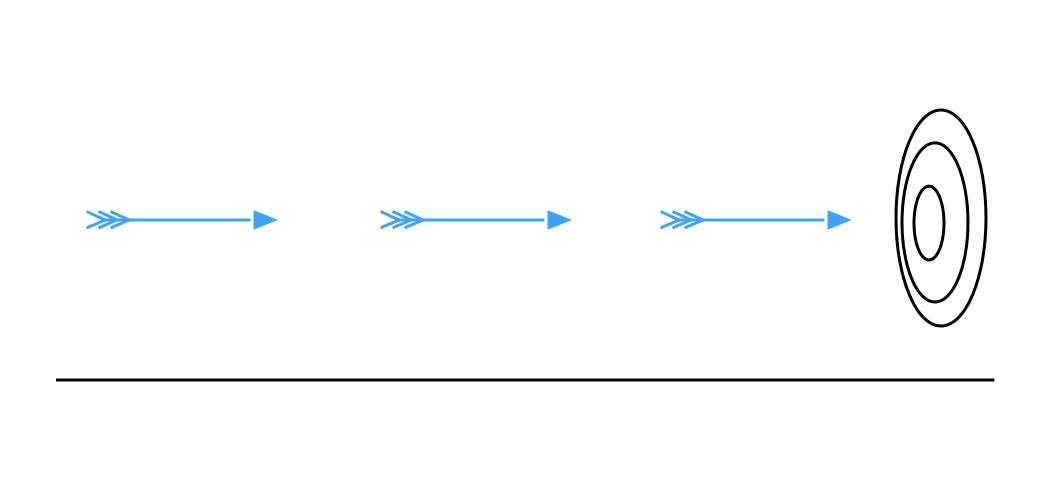
The flying arrow

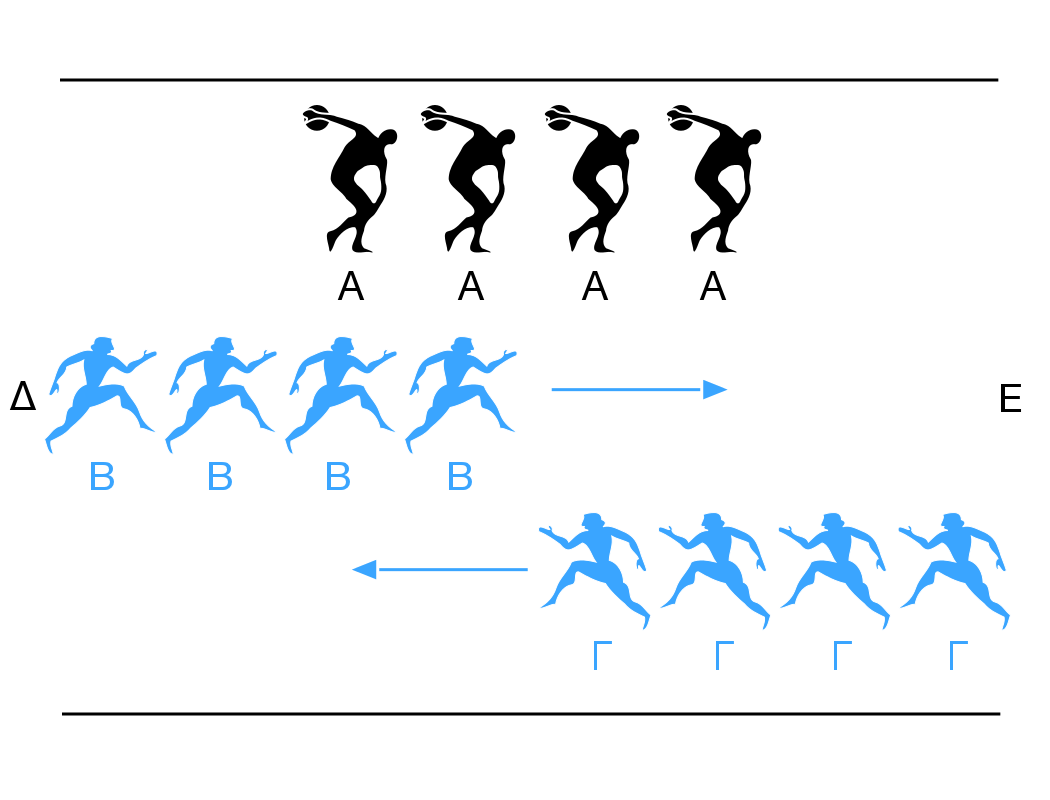
The moving rows

== Legacy ==
=== Antiquity ===
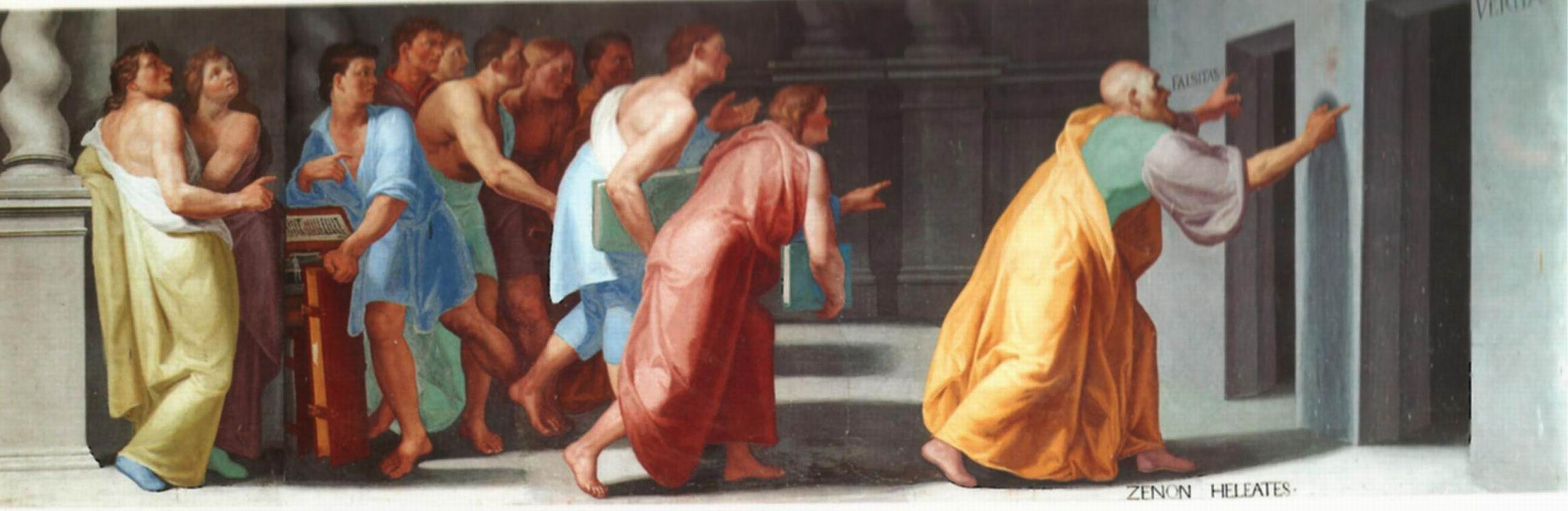
Zeno shows the Doors to Truth and Falsity (Veritas et Falsitas). Fresco in the Library of El Escorial, Madrid.

Zeno's greatest influence was within the thought of the Eleatic school, as his arguments built on the ideas of Parmenides, though his paradoxes were also of interest to Ancient Greek mathematicians. Zeno is regarded as the first philosopher who dealt with attestable accounts of mathematical infinity. Zeno was succeeded by the Greek Atomists, who argued against the infinite division of objects by proposing an eventual stopping point: the atom. Though Epicurus does not name Zeno directly, he attempts to refute some of Zeno's arguments.

Zeno appeared in Plato's dialogue Parmenides, and his paradoxes are mentioned in Phaedo. Aristotle also wrote about Zeno's paradoxes. Plato looked down on Zeno's approach of making arguments through contradictions. He believed that even Zeno himself did not take the arguments seriously. Aristotle disagreed, believing them to be worthy of consideration. He challenged Zeno's dichotomy paradox through his conception of infinity, arguing that there are two infinities: an actual infinity that takes place at once and a potential infinity that is spread over time. He contended that Zeno attempted to prove actual infinities using potential infinities. He also challenged Zeno's paradox of the stadium, observing that it is fallacious to assume a stationary object and an object in motion require the same amount of time to pass. The paradox of Achilles and the tortoise may have influenced Aristotle's belief that actual infinity cannot exist, as this non-existence presents a solution to Zeno's arguments.

=== Modern era ===
Zeno's paradoxes are still debated, and they remain one of the archetypal examples of arguments to challenge commonly held perceptions. The paradoxes saw renewed attention in 19th century philosophy that has persisted to the present. Zeno's philosophy shows a contrast between what one knows logically and what one observes with the senses with the goal of proving that the world is an illusion; this practice was later adopted by the modern philosophic schools of thought, empiricism and post-structuralism. Bertrand Russell praised Zeno's paradoxes, crediting them for allowing the work of mathematician Karl Weierstrass.

Scientific phenomena have been named after Zeno. The hindrance of a quantum system by observing it is usually called the Quantum Zeno effect as it is strongly reminiscent of Zeno's arrow paradox. In the field of verification and design of timed and hybrid systems, the system behavior is called Zeno if it includes an infinite number of discrete steps in a finite amount of time.

Zeno's arguments against plurality have been challenged by modern atomic theory. Rather than plurality requiring both a finite and infinite amount of objects, atomic theory shows that objects are made from a specific number of atoms that form specific elements. Likewise, Zeno's arguments against motion have been challenged by modern mathematics and physics. Mathematicians and philosophers continued studying infinitesimals until they came to be better understood through calculus and limit theory. Ideas relating to Zeno's plurality arguments are similarly affected by set theory and transfinite numbers. Modern physics has yet to determine whether space and time can be represented on a mathematical continuum or if it is made up of discrete units.

Zeno's argument of Achilles and the tortoise can be addressed mathematically, as the distance is defined by a specific number. His argument of the flying arrow has been challenged by modern physics, which allows the smallest instants of time to still have a minuscule non-zero duration. Other mathematical ideas, such as internal set theory and nonstandard analysis, may also resolve Zeno's paradoxes. However, there is no definitive agreement on whether solutions to Zeno's arguments have been found.

In the realm of metaphysics, the scholar Lewis White Beck has also observed that Zeno's utilization of a "skeptical method" may have influenced the development of several paradoxes and antinomies by Immanuel Kant. Beck notes that by adopting Zeno's methodology, Kant avoided the apparent contradiction between two opposing philosophical arguments by calling into question the legitimacy of the apparent disagreement itself, while judiciously declining to support either of the two opposing arguments. In the process, he established a metaphysical foundation for his claim that, "the world we experience is not and does not contain a thing in itself but is only phenomenal."

== See also ==
- Incommensurable magnitudes – Number that is not a ratio of integers
- List of speakers in Plato's dialogues
