= Jerusalem College of Technology =

Israeli college

Coordinates: 31°45′51″N 35°11′31″E

Jerusalem College of Technology - Lev Academic Center
- המרכז האקדמי לב (לשעבר: בית הספר הגבוה לטכנולוגיה)
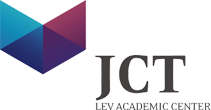
- Type: Private
- Established: 1969
- Affiliations: Orthodox Judaism
- President: Chaim Sukenik
- Dean: Rabbi Yosef Zvi Rimon
- Director: Kenneth Hochberg; Yosef Zaira
- Location: Jerusalem, Israel
- Website: jct.ac.il

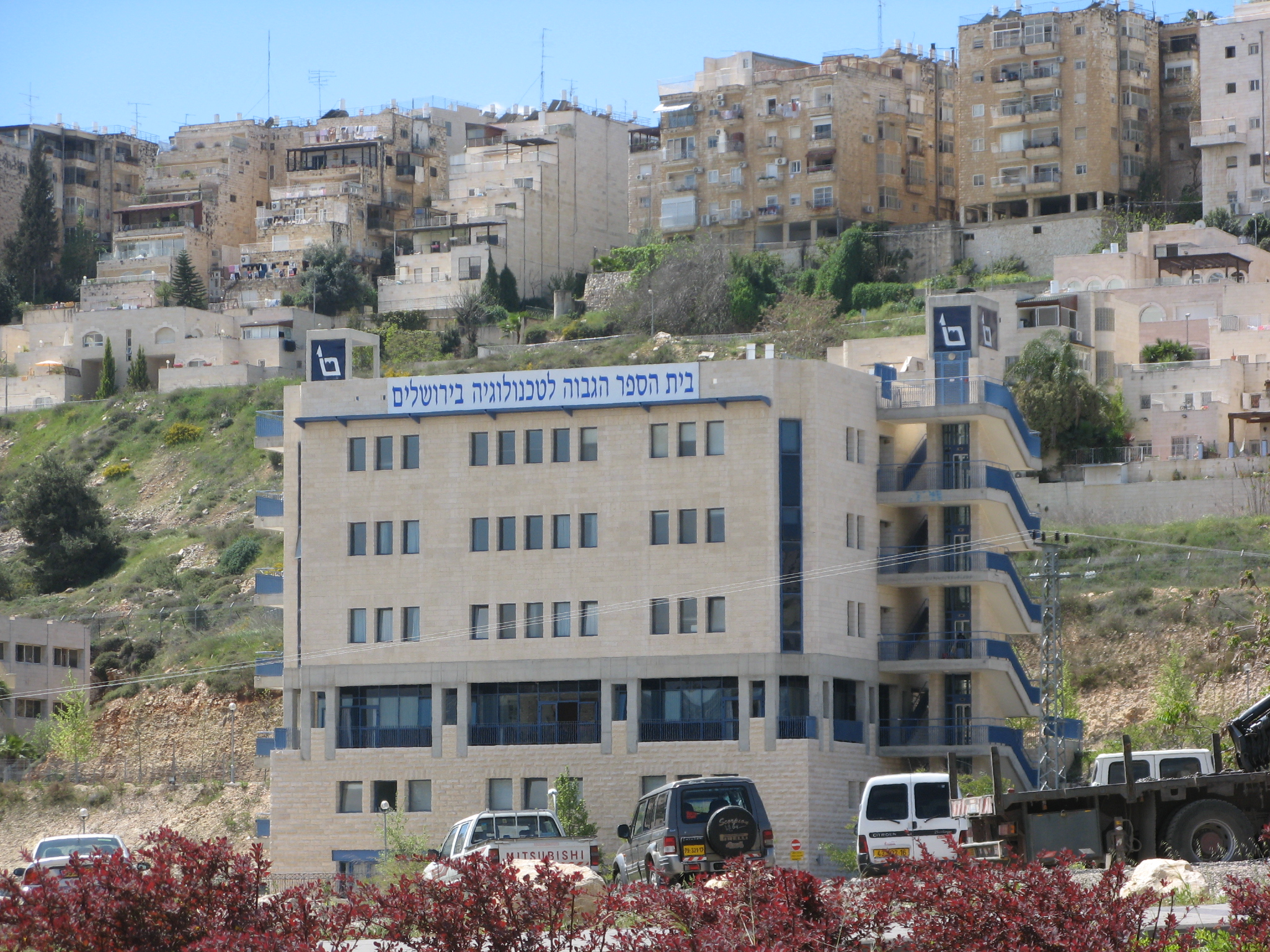
JCT main campus, Givat Mordechai

The Jerusalem College of Technology - Lev Academic Center (JCT; Hebrew: המרכז האקדמי לב) is a private college in Israel, recognized by the Council for Higher Education, which specializes in providing high-level science and technology education to the observant Jewish community. More than 2,000 of JCT's 4,700 students are ultra-Orthodox, and the remainder of the students are from diverse segments of Israeli society including Ethiopian-Israelis, national religious and international students.

JCT's main campus ("Lev") is situated in the Givat Mordechai neighborhood of Jerusalem. Other branches are located in the Givat Shaul neighborhood ("Tal Campus") of Jerusalem and Ramat Gan ("Lustig Campus"). JCT offers bachelor's degrees and master's degrees in several fields of study combined with intensive Jewish studies.

== History ==
The college, founded in 1969 by Professor Josef Haim Yakopow and Professor Ze'ev Lev, specializes in high-tech engineering, industrial management and life and health sciences. JCT is particularly known for its electro-optics faculty. The institution is fully accredited by the Council for Higher Education in Israel, the main authority overseeing Israel's academic institutions. Some 5,000 students are currently enrolled in JCT, with a faculty of over 500 professors, instructors and researchers. JCT's goal to bring higher education to under-served communities is most evident in their Program for Students from the Ethiopian Community and Haredi Integration programs.

JCT has separate campuses for men and women to allow the Orthodox and Haredi communities, who comprise the majority of its student body and insist on gender-separated classes, to study comfortably.

The college trains 20 percent of Israel's women engineers. One out of every five Israeli women studying for a BSc in computer science and/or software engineering does so at JCT, and 53 percent of the school's computer science students are women—18 percent higher than any other Israeli university.

== Branches ==
The Jerusalem College of Technology comprises the following campuses:

- Lev Campus - academic studies combined with yeshiva studies for men. This campus also includes the Naveh program for Haredi men.
- Tal Campus - academic studies combined with midrasha (religious) studies for women. This campus also includes the Tvuna program for Haredi and Hassidic women.
- Lustig Campus - founded in 1999 and geared toward Haredi women.

== Degrees awarded ==
=== Bachelor of Science ===
- Electronic Engineering
- Applied Physics/Electro-Optical Engineering
- Applied Physics/Medical Engineering
- Software Engineering
- Communication Systems Engineering
- Computer science
- Bioinformatics
- Industrial Engineering and Marketing
- Nursing (BSN)

=== Bachelor of Arts ===
- Accounting & Information systems
- Business Administration

=== Masters Degree ===
- (M.B.A.) - Business Administration
- (M.Sc) - Telecommunications Systems Engineering
- (M.Sc) - Physics/Electro-Optical Engineering
- (MSN) - Nursing

== Special Programs ==
=== The Reuven Surkis Program for Students from The Ethiopian Community ===
JCT was the pioneer among Israel's leading institutions of higher education in advancing the integration of Ethiopian immigrants. The Reuven Surkis Program for Students from The Ethiopian Community consists of a preparatory year program (Mechina) and a full degree program; most of the students studying in the full degree program participated first in the preparatory year program. The Reuven Surkis Program has produced 158 graduates.

=== Haredi Integration Program ===
The Center for Advancement of Haredim at JCT encourages Haredi men and women to pursue academic careers and consists, much like the program for the Ethiopian community of a preparatory year program (Mechina) and a full degree program. The Haredi Integration program has graduated thousands. There are currently more than 2,000 Haredi men and women studying towards degrees at JCT. According to Israel's Central Bureau of Statistics, about 50 percent of Haredi men in the country were employed by the end of 2017. JCT's Haredi graduates have attained an 89-percent employment rate, including 77 percent that are employed in their field of choice. Among the 1,000 Israeli Haredim who studied computer science in 2017, two-thirds of them studied at JCT.

=== International Program ===
The International Program in English at JCT is a three-year-long program with majors in Computer Science (Full-Time BSC), and Business Administration (Part-Time BA).

=== Cyber Elite ===
JCT's Cyber Elite program provides training to graduates in software engineering and computer science, while simultaneously placing them in cyber departments of multinational, aerospace and defense companies, and in cyber startups. This opens up the cyber field to the Haredi community and to others who previously experienced difficulty attaining cyber positions because they were not represented in cyber units within the Israel Defense Forces.

=== Nursing program ===
JCT's BSN (bachelor's of nursing) program in nursing accounts for 20 percent of all nursing students in Israel. The college's Nursing Department was awarded (2018) the Israeli Ministry of Health's National Prize for Excellence, ranking first among 24 departments nationwide in all measured criteria.

=== Israel's First Master's Program in Health Informatics ===
JCT's Nursing Department is launching Israel's first master's degree program in the growing field of Health Informatics, which focuses on managing and analyzing data to support the best clinical decisions and treatment for patients. Health informatics utilizes the study and application of clinical information and computer science to design and deploy effective technologies that support the delivery of healthcare services and improve information management.

JCT's health informatics program is open to registered nurses with a bachelor's degree and was developed with the assistance of the University of Toronto's Institute of Health Policy, Management and Evaluation, in addition to the support of the Canadian Friends of JCT. The certificate program that ran this year as a prelude to opening the MSc program completed its studies in April (2018), just as Israel's Council for Higher Education approved the Master of Health Informatics degree for the 2018-2019 academic year. The partnership between JCT and U of T was facilitated by Professor Judith Shamian, past president of the International Council of Nurses and a member of JCT's board of trustees.

== See also ==
- Education in Israel
- List of universities and colleges in Israel
- Science and technology in Israel
