= Nearchus of Elea =

5th-century BC Greek tyrant of Elea

Nearchus (Greek: Νέαρχος, Nearchos) was a tyrant of the ancient Greek city of Elea in Magna Graecia, who ruled in the 5th century BC. He is only known from an anecdote in connection with the philosopher Zeno of Elea, whom Nearchus tortured and, according to some sources, executed for having conspired against Nearchus's regime.
