= Philippe Mariani =

British CEO

Philippe Mariani is CEO of Genesis Investment Company (B.S.C.), which was incorporated in June 2008 as a wholly owned subsidiary of Kuwait Finance House Bahrain (B.S.C). Mariani was Honorary Consul of the Republic of Seychelles in Nice from 2003 to 2007.

== Early life and career ==
Mariani was born in London and was educated in the UK and France. He graduated from University of Nice Sophia Antipolis (France) with a BA in Economy, Institutional Affairs and Foreign Languages (LEA). He holds a professional post graduate degree (M2) specialized in Multimedia creation and engineering from the same university, under the direction of art theoretician Norbert Hillaire.

In 1989, he was appointed as campaign director to Pierre Laffitte a prominent French politician from Alpes-Maritimes (France) and subsequently became Parliamentary Assistant at the re-election of Pierre Laffitte as senator in 1998.

== Career ==
From 2002 to 2006 he was the Delegated Director of the Sophia Antipolis Foundation, in Sophia Antipolis Science and Technology park (France) and became the driving force behind major international strategic partnerships.

Mariani helped diffuse innovations in new media, creating the French art portal Artsophia under the patronage of the French Ministry of Culture, stating alongside artists such as Fred Forest and Ben that “the artist must conquer a new kind of space, cyberspace via computer art”.

This initiative led to the creation of the “Artsophia association for cultural life“ in which he was nominated as General Secretary under the Presidency of André Villers, the renown French photographer, who worked closely with Picasso in the 1950s, organizing a series of international Exhibitions including Picasso's most ambitious photographic project the series of lithographs entitled Diurnes (1962) and co-organizing the “Festival of the Fourth Dimension”, a festival dedicated to the fusion of Art, Science and Technology.

== Kuwait Finance House Bahrain ==
In 2006, Mariani led the initiative of a science and technology park in the Kingdom of Bahrain by the Kuwait Finance House Bahrain as Senior Business Development Advisor . In 2008 he was nominated CEO of Genesis Investment Company, a Holding Company with the purpose of investing in the worldwide domain of Science and Technology Parks.

He is spearheading the initiative in Bahrain with focus on Water and Marine Technologies and Information and communication technologies (ICT) as its primary clusters.

== Other activities ==
Mariani is the Head of Mosaic Bahrain chapter, a mentoring Network established by Charles, Prince of Wales to bridge the gap between Muslim youth and their peers in the world.

He leads the “Annual Sophia Antipolis Mentorship Programme” and the Crown Prince's International Scholarship Program (CPISP) for Kuwait Finance House Bahrain established by the Crown Prince and Deputy Supreme Commander, Prince Salman bin Hamad Al Khalifa.

He is a board member representing France of the “Club Sophia Nordic Link” (CSNL) a distinguished and selected club for business professionals to promote business and to strengthen commercial and cultural relations between the Nordic Countries (Denmark, Finland, Iceland, Norway and Sweden, South of France and Monaco, a business club he founded and of which he was president from 2003 to 2005.

== Notes and references ==
- http://www.africaintelligence.com/aif/channel/country/SEYCHELLES/31/
- http://www.senat.fr/rap/r00-386/r00-38697.html
- http://www.lexpress.fr/informations/initiative_641986.html
- http://www.ameinfo.com/84108.html
- http://www.albawaba.com/en/news/205399/&mod=print
- http://www.plymouth.ac.uk/pages/view.asp?page=25137
- http://incubateurs-paca.com/index2.php?option=com_content&do_pdf=1&id=51
- http://www.qatarmorningpost.com/news/newsfull.php?newid=309379
- http://www.ameinfo.com/204086.html
