= Simon Critchley =

British philosopher (born 1960)

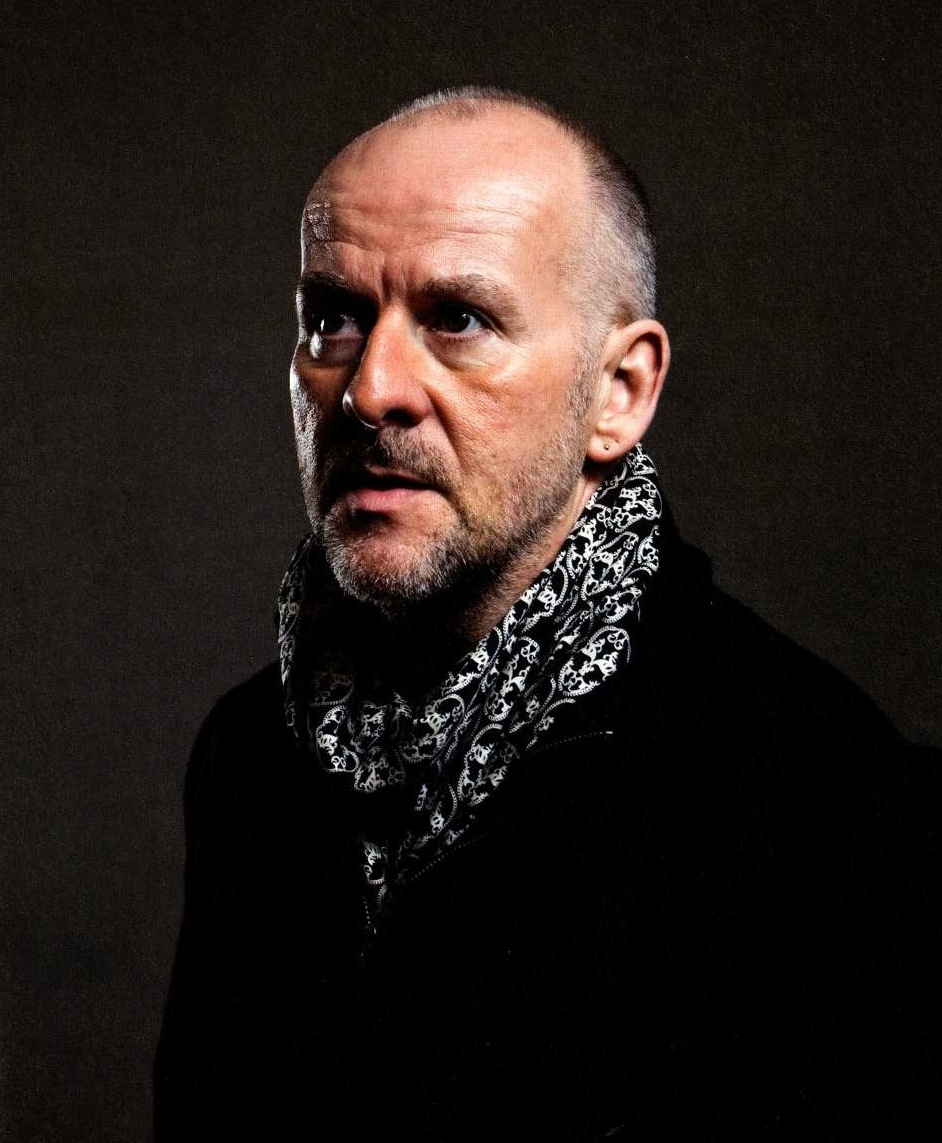
- Portrait, 2009
- Born: 27 February 1960 (age 66); Letchworth, Hertfordshire, England

Education
- Education: University of Essex (BA, PhD); University of Nice (MA)
- Thesis: The Chiasmus: Levinas, Derrida and the Ethics of Deconstructive Reading (1988)

Philosophical work
- Era: Contemporary philosophy
- Region: Western philosophy
- School: Continental philosophy
- Institutions: New School for Social Research
- Main interests: Political philosophy, ethics, aesthetics

Simon James Critchley (born 27 February 1960) is an English philosopher and the Hans Jonas Professor of Philosophy at the New School for Social Research in New York City, US.

== Biography ==
Critchley was born on 27 February 1960, in Letchworth, England, to a working-class family originally from Liverpool. In grammar school, he studied history, sciences, languages (French and Russian) and English literature. During this time, he developed a lifelong interest in ancient history. After intentionally failing his school exams, Critchley worked a number of odd jobs, including in a pharmaceutical factory in which he sustained a severe injury to his left hand. During this time, he was a participant in the emerging punk scene in England, playing in numerous bands that all failed.

After studying for remedial 'O' and 'A' level exams at a community college while doing other odd jobs, Critchley went to university aged 22. He attended the University of Essex to study literature, but switched to philosophy. Critchley completed his PhD in 1988; his thesis became the basis for his first monograph, The Ethics of Deconstruction.

Critchley became a university fellow at University College Cardiff in 1988. In 1989, he returned to the University of Essex as lecturer and where he would become reader in 1995 and full professor in 1999. From 1998 to 2004, he was Directeur de Programme at the Collège international de philosophie in Paris. Since 2004, Critchley has been professor of philosophy at the New School for Social Research in New York; he became the Hans Jonas Professor of Philosophy in 2011. Since 2015, he has served on the board of the Onassis Foundation. In 2021, Critchley was named by Academic Influence as one of the top 25 most influential philosophers of today. Critchley is married to Sophia Critchley, and they live in Brooklyn.

== Philosophical Work ==
=== Overview ===
Critchley is a prolific author and has written over twenty monographs, including works on philosophers’ deaths, Hamlet, Greek tragedy, suicide, association football, and David Bowie. He has also written numerous essays and articles on various thinkers and writers (such as Hegel, Heidegger, Jean Genet, Derrida, Levinas, Richard Rorty, Laclau, Lacan, Jean-Luc Nancy, and Blanchot) and on topics ranging from the dimensions of Plato's academy and the mysteries of Eleusis to Philip K. Dick, Mormonism, money, and the joy and pain of Liverpool Football Club fans. Many of these pieces appear in three essay collections: Ethics-Politics-Subjectivity: Essays on Derrida, Levinas, & Contemporary French Thought (1999); Bald: 35 Philosophical Short Cuts (2021); and I Want to Die, I Hate My Life: Three Essays on Tragedy and One on Beckett (2025).

Critchley's extensive work on Martin Heidegger has appeared in many formats: as a series of 8 articles written in 2009 for The Guardian; as a commentary, On Heidegger's "Being and Time" (2008), which was published along with Reiner Schürmann’s lectures on Heidegger; and as an extended series of podcasts, "Apply-Degger," which are intended to be a long-form, deep dive into Heidegger's magnum opus, Being and Time. Critchley has also sustained a long engagement with the work of Emmanuel Levinas. He is the co-editor (with Robert Bernasconi) of The Cambridge Companion to Levinas, and his The Problem with Levinas, an edited collection of four lectures, appeared in 2015.

His work and writing also appears in various other formats and genres: a volume on Continental Philosophy (2001) for Oxford University Press’ “Very Short Introductions” series; a series of interviews with Carl Cederström, How to Stop Living and Start Worrying (2010), based on a Swedish TV series; an edited collection of various interviews and conversations (spanning a decade) with Critchley himself, published as Impossible Objects (2012); a novella, Memory Theater (2014); a book-length philosophical essay titled Notes on Suicide (2015); and a book of fragments, ABC of Impossible Objects (2015).

=== Late 1990s ===
Critchley’s first monograph, The Ethics of Deconstruction: Derrida and Levinas (1992)—now in its third edition—argues against the received understanding of Derrida as either a metaphysician with his own ‘infrastructure’ or as a value-free nihilist who engages in endless relativization. Instead, Critchley argues that central to Derrida's thinking is a conception of ethical experience that is informed by his engagement with Levinas. Critchley also lays out “the ethical and political underpinnings of the deconstructive project itself.”

Critchley's second monograph, Very Little ... Almost Nothing: Death, Philosophy, Literature (1997), begins from the problem of religious disappointment and the “death of God”, which generates the “grander” question of the meaning of life. Critchley develops his thesis through “individual readings” of Blanchot, Levinas, Cavell, German Romanticism, Adorno, Derrida, Beckett, and Wallace Stevens.

=== 2000s ===
On Humour (2002) explores the role that humour, jokes, laughter, and smiling play in human life, all of which arise from the “brute, phenomenological fact” that we are “embodied actors”—physiognomy, Critchley thinks, is intimately bound up with what we find humorous and with laughter.

In Things Merely Are: Philosophy in the Poetry of Wallace Stevens (2005), Critchley argues that Stevens is the “philosophically most interesting poet to have written in English in the twentieth century” and that his poetry offers illuminating insights into how we can recast the relationship between mind, language, and material things. The book also includes an extended engagement with the cinema of Terrence Malick.

Critchley's Infinitely Demanding: Ethics of Commitment, Politics of Resistance (2007) challenges the ancient notion that philosophy begins in wonder, and argues that philosophy begins in disappointment. The book addresses the topic of political disappointment, and argues for an ethically informed neo-anarchism.

Perhaps Critchley's most famous work, The Book of Dead Philosophers (2008) takes its cue from Cicero’s remark that “to philosophize is to learn how to die”—a claim that is “axiomatic for most ancient philosophy” (and that can be found as far back as Socrates and down to Montaigne). Critchley “is as interested in what philosophers have thought about death as in how they died.” He catalogues and discusses the deaths (and lives) and last words of around 190 philosophers, from the pre-Socratic age right down to the 21st century.

=== 2010s–present ===
In The Faith of the Faithless: Experiments in Political Theology (2012), Critchley aims to use his account of “dividualism” from his 2007 book, Infinitely Demanding, as a jumping-off point to rethink faith as a political concept, without dismissing religion (as atheists do) or letting it fall into fundamentalist hands. The book takes its title from a remark by Oscar Wilde, and Critchley argues that it is in our failure to meet “the infinite ethical demands” that religion makes on us that a space is created for a paradoxically faithless faith. The last chapter, “the most rebarbative, and the funniest,” is a response to Žižek’s criticism of Infinitely Demanding.

Co-authored with Jamieson Webster, Stay, Illusion! The Hamlet Doctrine (2013) approaches Shakespeare’s Hamlet “through a double philosophical and psychoanalytic lens,” drawing on the play's various readings (by, for example, Carl Schmitt, Walter Benjamin, Hegel, Freud, Lacan, and Nietzsche).

Critchley has said that since the mid- to late 2010s, he has been explicitly trying to write on his “elemental passions,” and that Bowie and football (or soccer) figure at the top of that list. In his well-received, “elegant” 2014 book on David Bowie (which was expanded and re-published in 2016), he aimed, in his own words, “to try and find concepts that do justice to Bowie’s art in ways that are neither music journalism, dime store psychology, biography or crappy social history. . . . [to find] a language that gives the huge importance of pop culture its due, that describes and dignifies it in the right way.” In 2017, Critchley published What We Think When We Think About Football. In it, he explores the “poetics of football”—“an account of the game as a phenomenological experience, an inquiry into the fraught ecstasies of fandom, a delving into the contraction and expansion of time from first to last whistle, an exploration of the presence of history that lingers inside of momentous moments.”

Critchley's Tragedy, the Greeks, and Us (2019) was described by Simon Goldhill as “self-consciously obsessed with how and why philosophers have wanted to regulate tragedy” and that rejects “the tragic” as a subject or as an “abstract quality,” and emphasizes the experiential, phenomenological aspects of the plays. His most recent monograph, On Mysticism: The Experience of Ecstasy, is a survey and exploration of historical mystics (such as Julian of Norwich and Meister Eckhart) through the works of writers such as Annie Dillard and T.S. Eliot, and was published in 2024.

=== Public Philosophy ===
Critchley is explicit in his defense of the relevance of philosophy in the public realm and outside academia. Between 2010 and 2021, Critchley moderated The Stone in The New York Times. Contributors have included thinkers such as Linda Martín Alcoff, Seyla Benhabib, Gary Gutting, Philip Kitcher, Chris Lebron, Todd May, Jason Stanley, and Peter Singer. The forum has generated three collections of essays, co-edited by Critchley and Peter Catapano, and published by W.W. Norton & Co.: The Stone Reader: Modern Philosophy in 133 Arguments (2015), The Stone Reader: Modern Ethics in 77 Arguments (2017), and Question Everything: A Stone Reader (2022).

== Other Interests ==
Critchley is a self-confessed fan of David Bowie, Nick Cave, Iggy Pop, Otis Redding, Al Green, Curtis Mayfield, and Julian Cope. Critchley is also a musician and a member of the “self-styled ‘obscure music duo’” Critchley & Simmons, alongside John Simmons. The duo has released several albums, most recently “Gone Forever” (2024).

He is a lifelong, religious fan of Liverpool Football Club.

Together with writer Tom McCarthy, Critchley is a founding member of the International Necronautical Society (INS) and serves as Head Philosopher.

== Works ==
- (1992, 1999, 2014) The Ethics of Deconstruction: Derrida and Levinas, Edinburgh: Edinburgh University Press. ISBN 978-0748689323
- (1997) Very Little... Almost Nothing: Death, Philosophy, Literature, Routledge, London & New York (2nd Edition, 2004). ISBN 978-0415340496
- (1999) Ethics-Politics-Subjectivity: Essays on Derrida, Levinas, and Contemporary French Thought, Verso, London (Reissued, 2007). ISBN 978-1844673513
- (2001) Continental Philosophy: A Very Short Introduction, Oxford University Press. ISBN 978-0192853592
- (2002) On Humour, Routledge, London ISBN 978-0415251211.
- (2005) On the Human Condition, with Dominique Janicaud & Eileen Brennan, Routledge, London. ISBN 978-0415327961
- (2005) Things Merely Are: Philosophy in the Poetry of Wallace Stevens, Routledge, London. ISBN 978-0415356312
- (2007) Infinitely Demanding. Ethics of Commitment, Politics of Resistance, Verso, London & New York. ISBN 978-1781680179
- (2008) The Book of Dead Philosophers, Granta Books, London; Vintage, New York; Melbourne University Press, Melbourne. ISBN 978-0307390431
- (2008) On Heidegger’s ‘Being and Time’, with Reiner Schürmann, edited by Steven Levine, Routledge, London and New York. ISBN 978-0415775960
- (2008) Der Katechismus des Bürgers, Diaphanes Verlag, Berlin. ISBN 978-3037340325
- (2010) How to Stop Living and Start Worrying, Polity Press. ISBN 978-0745650395.
- (2011) Impossible Objects, Polity Press ISBN 978-0745653211.
- (2011) International Necronautical Society: Offizielle Mitteilungen
- (2012) The Mattering of Matter. Documents from the Archive of the International Necronautical Society, with Tom McCarthy, Sternberg Press, Berlin. ISBN 978-3943365344
- (2012) The Faith of the Faithless, Verso. ISBN 978-1781681688
- (2013) Stay, Illusion! The Hamlet Doctrine, Pantheon (North America); Verso (Europe). ISBN 978-0307950482
- (2014) Memory Theatre, Fitzcarraldo Editions (UK). ISBN 978-0992974718
- (2014) Bowie, OR Books. ISBN 978-1939293541
- (2015) Suicide, Thought Catalog/Kindle Single. ASIN: B00YB0UZDC
- (2015) Notes on Suicide, Fitzcarraldo Editions (UK). ISBN 978-1910695067
- (2015) The Problem With Levinas, Oxford University Press. ISBN 978-0198738763
- (2015) ABC of Impossibility, Univocal. ISBN 978-1937561499
- (2017) What We Think About When We Think About Football, Profile Books. ISBN 978-1781259214
- (2019) Tragedy, the Greeks, and Us, Pantheon Press (US), Profile Books (UK). ISBN 978-1524747947
- (2021) Bald: 35 Philosophical Short Cuts, Yale University Press. ISBN 978-0300255966
- (2024) On Mysticism, Profile Books (UK). ISBN 978-1800816930
- (2025) I Want to Die, I Hate My Life: Three Essays on Tragedy and One on Beckett, Eris. ISBN 978-1916809710

As Co-editor

- (1991) Re-Reading Levinas, ed. with Robert Bernasconi, Indiana University Press, Bloomington. ISBN 978-0253206244
- (1996) Deconstructive Subjectivities, ed. with Peter Dews, State University of New York Press, Ithaca, NY. ISBN 978-0791427248
- (1996) Emmanuel Levinas: Basic Philosophical Writings, ed. with Adriaan T. Peperzak and Robert Bernasconi, Indiana University Press, Bloomington. ISBN 978-0253210791
- (1998) A Companion to Continental Philosophy, ed. with William R. Schroeder, Blackwell Publishing, Oxford. ISBN 978-0631190134
- (2002) The Cambridge Companion to Levinas, ed. with Robert Bernasconi, Cambridge University Press. ISBN 978-0521665650
- (2004) Laclau: A Critical Reader, ed. with Oliver Marchart, Routledge, London. ISBN 978-0415238441
- (2014) The Anarchist Turn, eds. Jacob Blumenfeld and Chiara Bottici, Pluto Books. ISBN 978-0745333427
- (2017) The Stone Reader: Modern Philosophy in 133 Arguments, ed. with Peter Catapano, W.W. Norton & Co. ISBN 978-1631490712
- (2017) Modern Ethics in 77 Arguments, ed. with Peter Catapano, W.W. Norton & Co. ISBN 978-1631492983
- (2022) Question Everything: A Stone Reader, ed. with Peter Catapano, W.W. Norton & Co. ISBN 978-1324091837
