= Zita Martins =

Portuguese astrobiologist

Zita Carla Torrão Pinto Martins
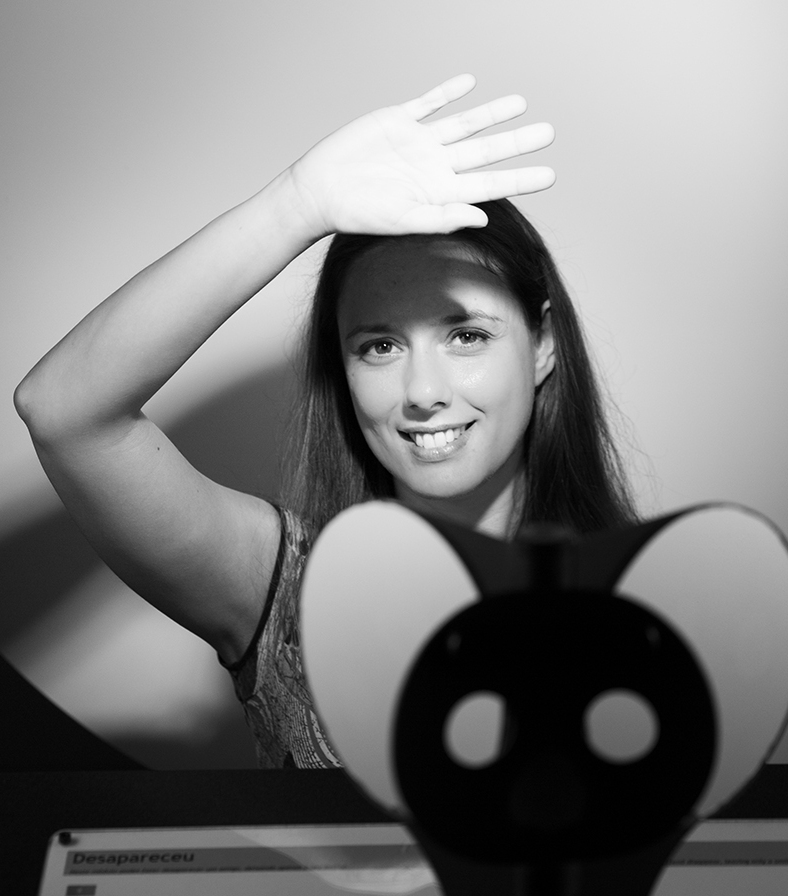
- Born: March 19, 1979 (age 47)
- Education: Leiden University; Instituto Superior Técnico
- Known for: Astrobiology, Meteorites and extraterrestrial organic matter, science communication
- Awards: Royal Society University Research Fellowship (2009-2017); Military Order of Saint James of the Sword (2015)
- Scientific career
- Fields: Astrobiology; Cosmochemistry; Planetary science
- Workplaces: Instituto Superior Técnico; Imperial College London; University of Nice Sophia Antipolis; Goddard Space Flight Center
- Thesis: Chemical analysis of organic molecules in carbonaceous meteorites (2007)
- Doctoral advisor: Pascale Ehrenfreund
- Website: fenix.tecnico.ulisboa.pt/homepage/ist31684

Zita Carla Torrão Pinto Martins (born 1979), OSE, is a Portuguese astrobiologist, and an associate professor at Instituto Superior Técnico. She was a Royal Society University Research Fellow (URF) at Imperial College London. Her research explores how life may have begun on Earth by looking for organic compounds in meteorite samples.

== Early life and education ==
As a child, Zita Martins studied classical ballet from the age of four and was encouraged by her teacher to progress to the National Ballet School in Portugal, which would have put her on track to become a professional dancer. Instead, at the age of 15, she decided she wanted to pursue science, gave up ballet and taught herself Russian. At secondary school, she filled in a careers test, which advised her strengths were in science and art, which Zita Martins says was not very helpful.

As an undergraduate studying chemistry, at Instituto Superior Técnico, Martins was unsure how to direct her education towards a career in space science. She says, "I emailed NASA and asked them what I should do. They told me to do an internship in the Netherlands. I did an internship there, and did a really cool project analysing samples from space (i.e. meteorites). I thought: ‘this is cool; I want to do this for the rest of my life’.

She was awarded a PhD in 2007 for Chemical analysis of organic molecules in carbonaceous meteorites from Leiden University supervised by Pascale Ehrenfreund. While completing her PhD, she gave a talk which led to an invitation to become an Invited Scientist at NASA.

== Research and career ==
In 2013, Zita Martins, working with colleagues from the University of Kent shot steel projectiles at ice samples, which simulated the composition of comets to find out if their impact is responsible for the production of complex organic molecules. The experiment found that the impact-shock of a comet produces a number of amino acids, which are the building blocks of proteins. This has implications for the origin of life on Earth but also potentially in the icy moons of Jupiter and Saturn.

Zita Martins is Co-Investigator of two European Space Agency missions, OREOcube and EXOcube, which will be installed on the International Space Station in the future.

Zita Martins has an active involvement with the international media. She is a BBC Expert Women Scientist.

=== Awards and honours ===
Her awards and honours include:

- Officer of the Military Order of Saint James of the Sword (25 February 2019) - For exceptional and outstanding merits in science.
- Royal Society University Research Fellowship (URF) a Research Fellowship in 2009.
