= Chaim Sukenik =

Israeli chemist

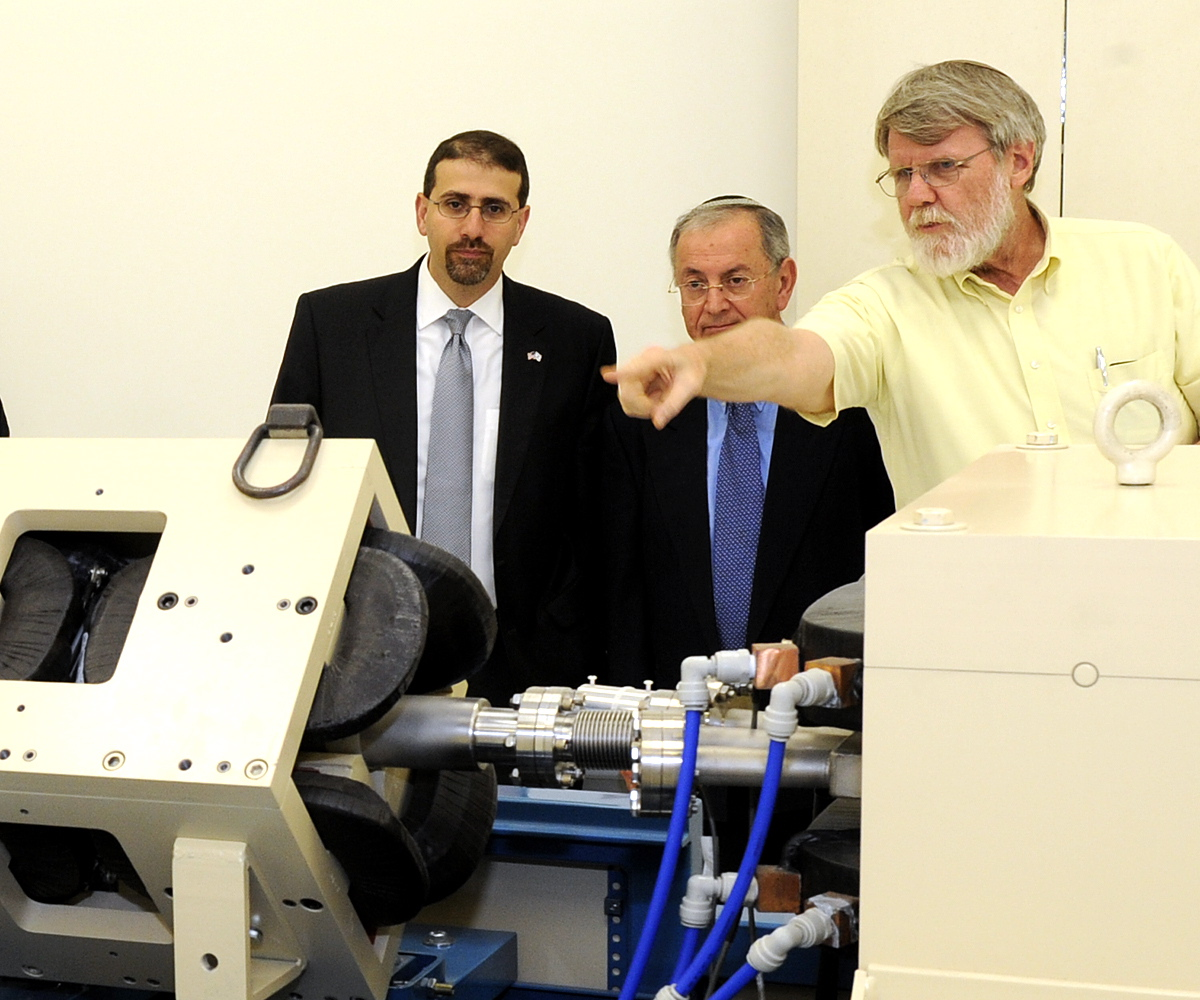
- Sukenik (right) with former BIU President Moshe Kaveh and former U.S. Ambassador Dan Shapiro.
- Born: May 1, 1951 (age 75); United States
- Education: Yeshiva University (BA); California Institute of Technology (PhD)
- Known for: Self-assembled monolayers, Surface modification, Nanofabrication
- Scientific career
- Fields: Organic chemistry, Nanotechnology, Materials science
- Workplaces: Jerusalem College of Technology; Bar-Ilan University; Case Western Reserve University
- Doctoral advisor: Robert G. Bergman

Chaim Sukenik (born May 1951) is an American-Israeli chemist and academic administrator. He is a professor emeritus of chemistry at Bar-Ilan University and served as the president of the Jerusalem College of Technology (JCT) from 2013 to 2025. Sukenik is widely recognized for his research in nanotechnology, surface chemistry, and materials science, particularly the development of self-assembled monolayers (SAMs).

== Early life and education ==
Sukenik was born and raised in the United States. He attended Yeshiva University, graduating magna cum laude in 1972 with a Bachelor of Arts in chemistry.

He completed his doctoral studies at the California Institute of Technology (Caltech), earning his Ph.D. in 1976 under the supervision of Robert G. Bergman. His dissertation focused on the catalysis of organic reactions and molecular orientation within crystals. He subsequently held a National Science Foundation postdoctoral fellowship at UCLA working with Orville L. Chapman.

== Academic career ==
Sukenik served as a faculty member at Case Western Reserve University from 1977 to 1995, where his research focused on interfacial chemistry and synthetic organic chemistry.

In 1995, Sukenik immigrated to Israel and joined the faculty of Bar-Ilan University (BIU). He held the Edward and Judy Steinberg Chair in Nanotechnology and served as the head of the Department of Chemistry and the dean of the Faculty of Exact Sciences. He was the founding director of the Bar-Ilan Institute for Nanotechnology and Advanced Materials (BINA).

In 2013, Sukenik was elected president of the Jerusalem College of Technology. During his tenure, the college significantly expanded its engineering and health science programs, particularly for the Haredi and religious sectors in Israel.

== Research ==
Sukenik's research is centered on surface modification and the chemical properties of thin films. He is a pioneer in the use of self-assembled monolayers (SAMs) to control the physical and chemical properties of surfaces at the molecular level.

His work has practical applications in:

- Microelectronics: Developing oxide thin films and interfacial layers for semiconductors.
- Aerospace: Designing protective coatings for satellite materials to withstand the harsh environment of low Earth orbit.
- Biomedical Engineering: Creating anti-bacterial coatings for medical devices and catheters to prevent biofouling.

== Awards and recognition ==
- Influential Olim Recognition (2014): Named by the Israeli Ministry of Aliyah and Integration as one of the most influential immigrants to Israel in the fields of science and medicine over the previous 25 years.
- Rector’s Prize for Excellence in Research: Awarded by Bar-Ilan University for his contributions to the field of chemistry and nanotechnology.
- Steinberg Chair in Nanotechnology: Appointed to this prestigious endowed chair at Bar-Ilan University in recognition of his leadership in the field.
- Phi Beta Kappa: Inducted as a member of the academic honor society during his undergraduate studies at Yeshiva University.
