= WWW Interactive Multipurpose Server =

WWW Interactive Multipurpose Server (WIMS)
- Developer(s): Xiao Gang
- Initial release: 1997
- Stable release: WIMS-4.17e / May 7, 2019
- Written in: C
- Type: Server software
- License: GNU General Public Licence
- Website: wims.unice.fr

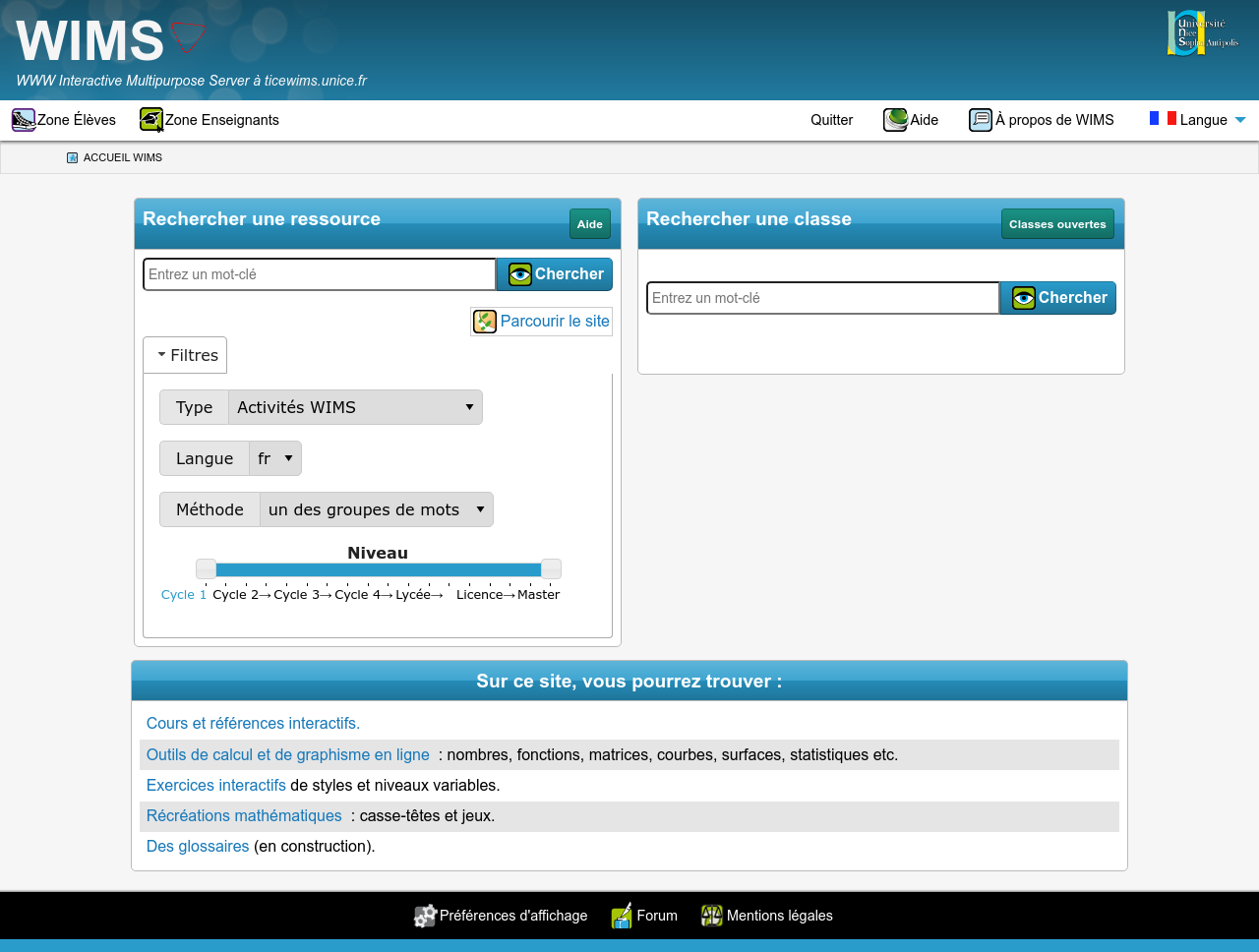
Screen shot of version 4.01 at the original University of Nice hosting.

The WWW Interactive Multipurpose Server (WIMS) (sometimes referred to as WWW Interactive Mathematics Server) project is designed for supporting intensive mathematical exercises via the Internet or in a computer-equipped classroom with server-side interactivity, accessible at the address http://wims.unice.fr.

The system has the following main features:

- A modular design allowing applications and software interfaces to be created and maintained independently from each other.
- Features interfaces for software including MuPAD, PARI/GP, Gnuplot, POV-Ray, Co.
- Dynamic rendering of mathematical formulas and animated graphics.
- A structure of virtual classes, including mechanisms for automatic score gathering and processing.

The program is open source and freely available under the GNU General Public Licence, however each WIMS module has its own copyright policy, which may differ from that of the server program.

It is often cited and linked for its sophisticated "online calculator" tools capable of generating animated GIFs of parametric 2D or 3D graphs or allowing prime tests with very large numbers.

== Author ==
Xiao Gang was a professor at University of Nice Sophia Antipolis. He was interested in solar energy and algebraic geometry. He was also the active site manager of the WIMS of the university he worked for. Xiao Gang died on June 27, 2014.

Xiao Gang taught himself during the Up to the Mountains and Down to the Countryside Movement. He obtained his master's degree from the University of Science and Technology of China. Xiao obtained his Ph.D. degree from University of Paris-Sud in 1984. Xiao Gang returned to China and became a lecturer at East China Normal University. He was promoted to professor in 1986, and was awarded the Shiing-Shen Chern Prize in Mathematics in 1991. In 1992, Xiao became a professor at University of Nice Sophia Antipolis.
