= Université Nice-Sophia-Antipolis =

French university in Nice

Coordinates: 43.7170°N 7.2665°E

University of Nice Sophia Antipolis
- Université Nice-Sophia-Antipolis
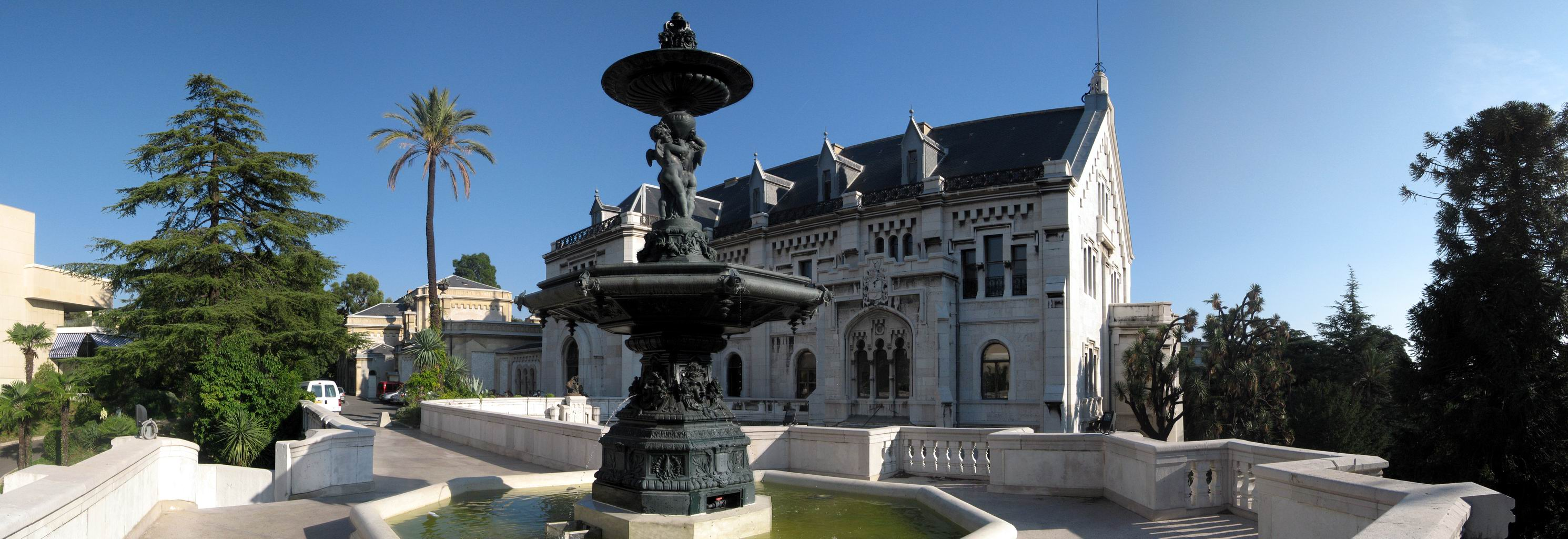
- The "Grand Château" building at UNSA's Valrose campus
- Motto: Passerelle vers le savoir et l'innovation
- Type: Public
- Active: 1965–2019
- Affiliations: Campus Europae
- Endowment: 243 million euros
- President: Frédérique Vidal
- Vice-president: Michel Rainelli
- Rector: Emmanuel Ethis
- Faculty: 1,575
- Administrative staff: 1,152
- Students: 25,049
- Undergraduates: 12,565
- Postgraduates: 5,146
- Doctoral students: 1,340
- Location: Nice, France
- Campus: Multiple campuses in Alpes-Maritimes
- Website: www.unice.fr

The University of Nice Sophia Antipolis (French: Université Nice-Sophia-Antipolis) was a university located in Nice, France, and neighboring areas. It was founded in 1965 and was organized in eight faculties, two autonomous institutes and an engineering school. It was merged in 2019 into the Côte d'Azur University.

It hosted the first WWW Interactive Multipurpose Server. It was a member of the Coordination of French Research-Intensive Universities, the equivalent of the Russell Group in the UK.

== History ==
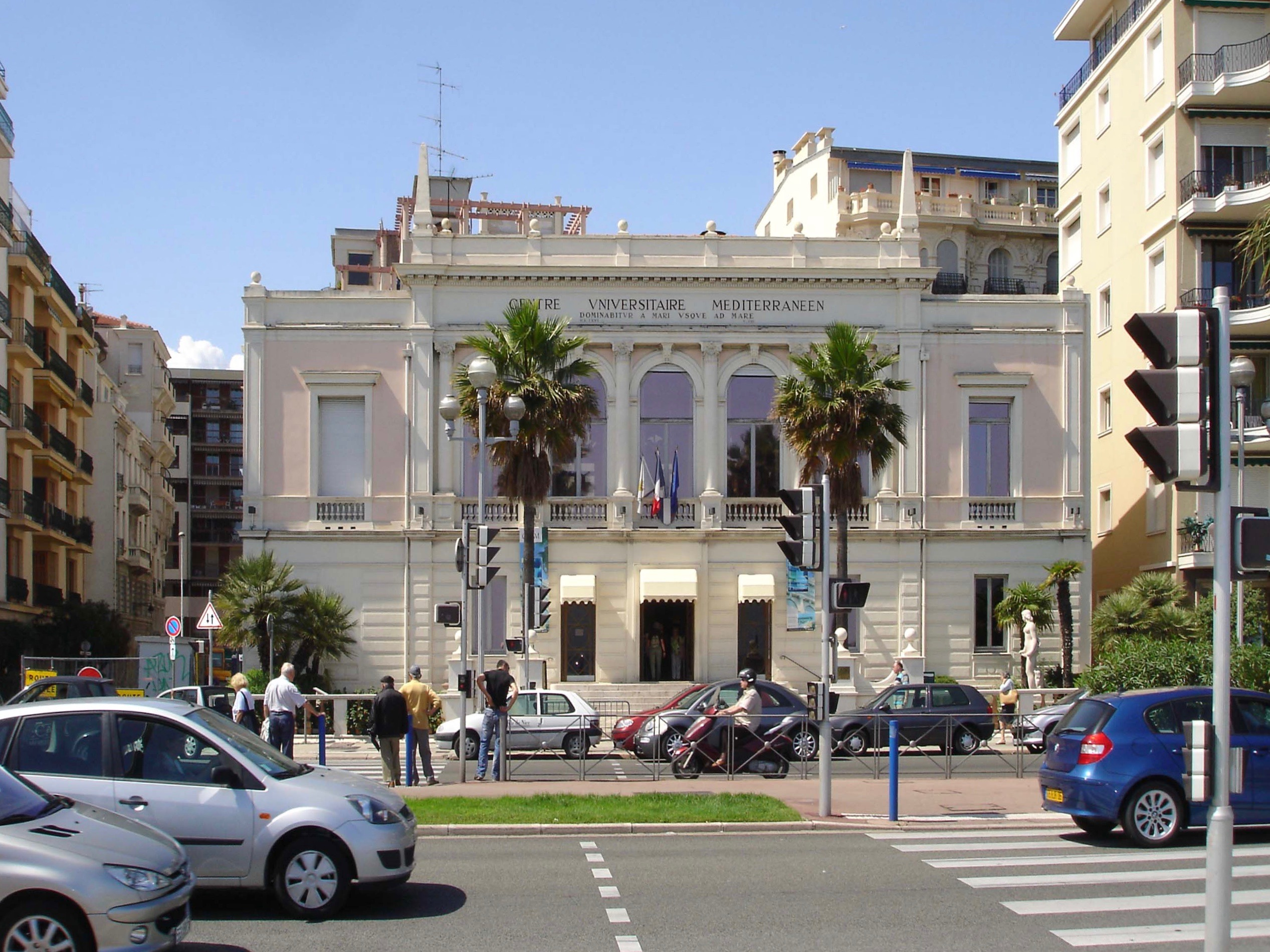
University Center.

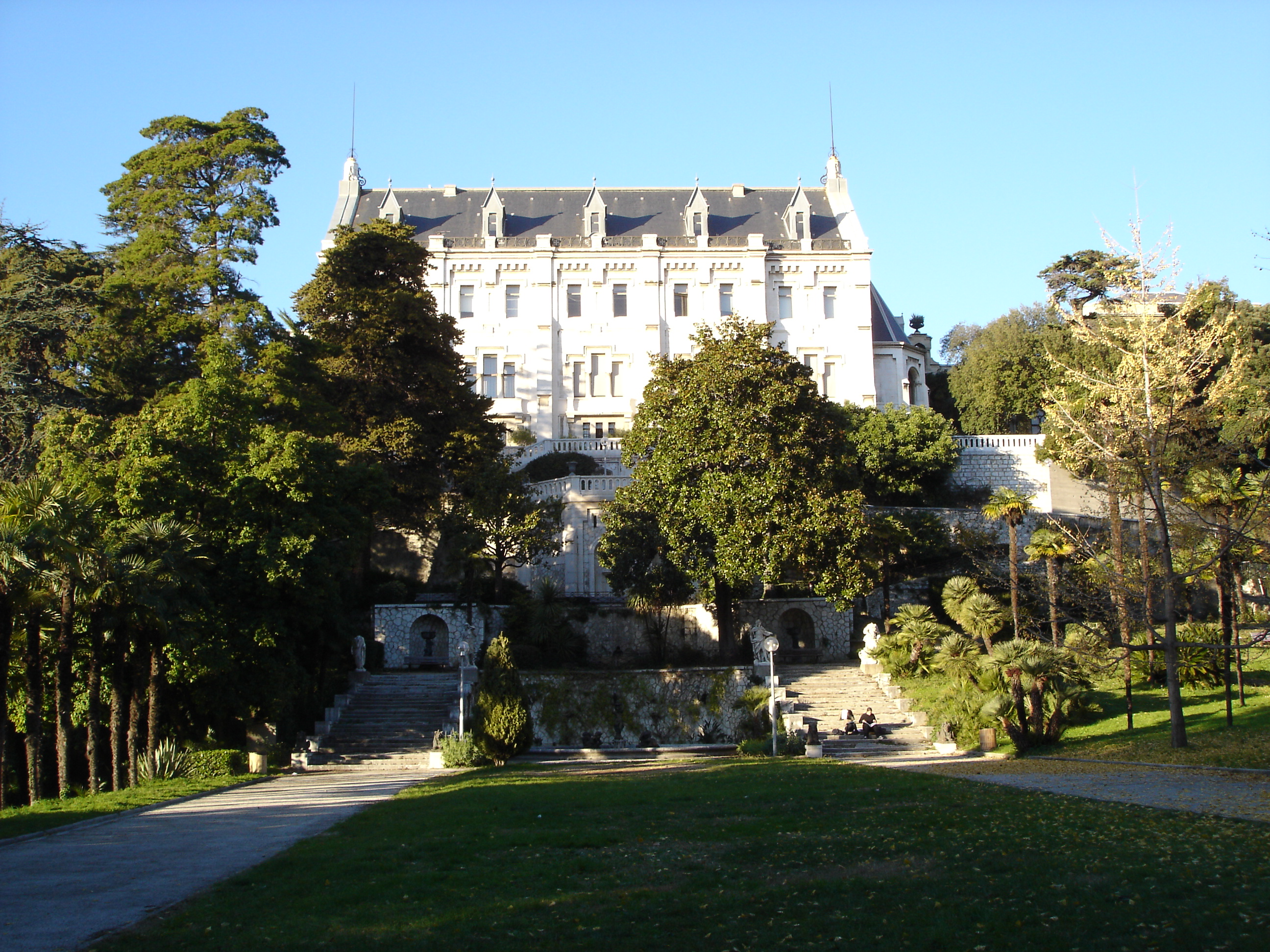
Château de Valrose.

The University of Nice was officially established by decree dated October 23, 1965. However, it has roots that go back to the 17th century, with the Collegium Jurisconsultorum Niciensium created in 1639 by the Princes of Savoy. It was composed of a body of jurisconsuls (law consultants and lawyers), and it lasted until Nice was incorporated into France in 1860. During the 17th century, courses were taught at its College of Medicine.

The University of Nice's vocation was asserted at the beginning of the 20th century, thanks to the combined efforts of several university members, such as Dean Louis Trotabas and Maurice Mignon. In 1933, with the help of local communities and the City of Nice in particular, they created the Centre Universitaire Méditerranéen (currently a conference center) situated on the Promenade des Anglais, whose first Administrator was French poet Paul Valéry. Following that, the Institut d'Etudes Juridiques was established in 1938, the Institut d'Etudes Littéraires in 1941, and the Institut d'Etudes Scientifiques in 1945. La Faculté de Droit et des Sciences Economiques (The College of Law and Economics) was created by decree on August 2, 1962, and was connected to the Université d'Aix-Marseille.

== Campus ==
The university had four main campuses: the Valrose campus (Sciences), the Trotabas campus (Law), the Saint-Jean d'Angély campus (Economics and Management), and the Carlone campus (Letters, Arts and Humanities).

However, the university also operated at several secondary locations, like Sophia Antipolis and Villefranche-sur-Mer outside Nice.

== Academics ==
=== Units of formation and research ===
- Law, Political, Economic and Management Sciences
- Institute of Law, Peace and Development
- Spaces and Cultures
- Letters, Arts and Social sciences
- Medicine
- Odontology
- Sciences
- Sciences and Technology of Physical and Sporting Activities

=== Institutes ===
- IAE Nice Graduate School of Management
- University Institute of Technology
- School of engineers
- University Polytechnic School – Polytech Nice-Sophia
- Laboratoire de Zététique
- Institute of the Right of Peace and Development (IDPD)
- Centre de la Méditerranée Moderne et Contemporaine, which produces the academic journal Cahiers de la Méditerranée, ISSN 1773-0201

The university's Institute of Languages also provided lectures and summer courses in French to foreign students.

== Notable alumni ==
Alphabetically by surname:

- Yukiya Amano – Japanese diplomat, Director General of IAEA
- Robert B. Asprey – American military historian and author
- William Boyd – Scottish novelist writer
- Nicolae Ceaușescu – Romanian dictator (honorary degree, 1975)
- Adrian Constantin – Romanian-Austrian mathematician
- Simon Critchley – English philosopher
- Driss Dahak – Moroccan diplomat, General Secretary of the Government
- Noah Dana-Picard – Israeli mathematician, professor, and Talmudic scholar
- Odile Hembise Fanton d'Andon – CEO of the ACRI-ST
- Jean-Lou Justine – parasitologist and zoologist
- Philippe Kahn – mathematician, technology innovator and entrepreneur
- Jean-Marie Gustave Le Clézio – writer, Nobel Prize in Literature
- Philippe Mariani – British entrepreneur
- Alexandra Martin – French MP
- Zita Martins – Portuguese astrobiologist
- Mohammed VI – King of Morocco
- Tomer Sisley – Israeli humorist, actor, screenwriter, comedian, and film director
- Fatoumata Tambajang – Vice-President of the Gambia
- Gilles Tonelli – Monegasque engineer, diplomat and politician
- Zeine Ould Zeidane – Former Prime Minister of Mauritania

== See also ==
- List of early modern universities in Europe
