= Education in Póvoa de Varzim =

Póvoa de Varzim has public, denominational and independent schools in the city and rural areas. Public education in the municipality is provided by five school districts (from kindergartens to 9th grade): Flávio Gonçalves, Cego do Maio, Aver-o-Mar, Campo Aberto, and Rates. These school districts arrange the schools of different locales of the municipality and are headed by EB 2/3 schools that give the name to the respective districts. In terms of independent schools the most distinguished are the Grande Colégio da Póvoa de Varzim and Campo Verde School of Agriculture.

Secondary education in Póvoa de Varzim was introduced in 1882 to respond to the needs of a community that prospered due to fishery and tourist industries. Thus the Municipal Institute with key skills in Portuguese, French, Latin, Geometry, History, and Complementary Primary Instruction was created. The Municipal Institute became the genesis of the National Lyceum created in 1904, now the Eça de Queirós Secondary School, that maintains its humanist outlook.

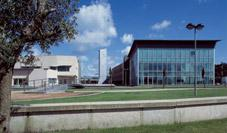
Porto Polytechnic's Superior School of Industrial Studies and Management.

In 1892, the formation of the trade association led to the immediate creation of mercantile and commercial accounting classes that would be genesis of the Rocha Peixoto Commercial School (created in 1924), which in 1940 was renamed Industrial and Commercial School, and is now Rocha Peixoto Secondary School, a school that still promises to turn out skilled professionals.

The Porto Polytechnic runs, jointly in Póvoa de Varzim and Vila do Conde, the Superior School of Industrial Studies and Management (ESEIG), which once was based in two campuses (one in each city), but it was united in a single new school, on the border between the two cities.

The illiteracy level in Póvoa de Varzim was reduced between 1991 and 2001 from 7 to 5.9 percent. A little more than one quarter of the population now has intermediate or superior level qualifications.
