= Faculdade de Media Artes e Design =

Faculty of Media Arts and Design
- Faculdade de Media Artes e Design
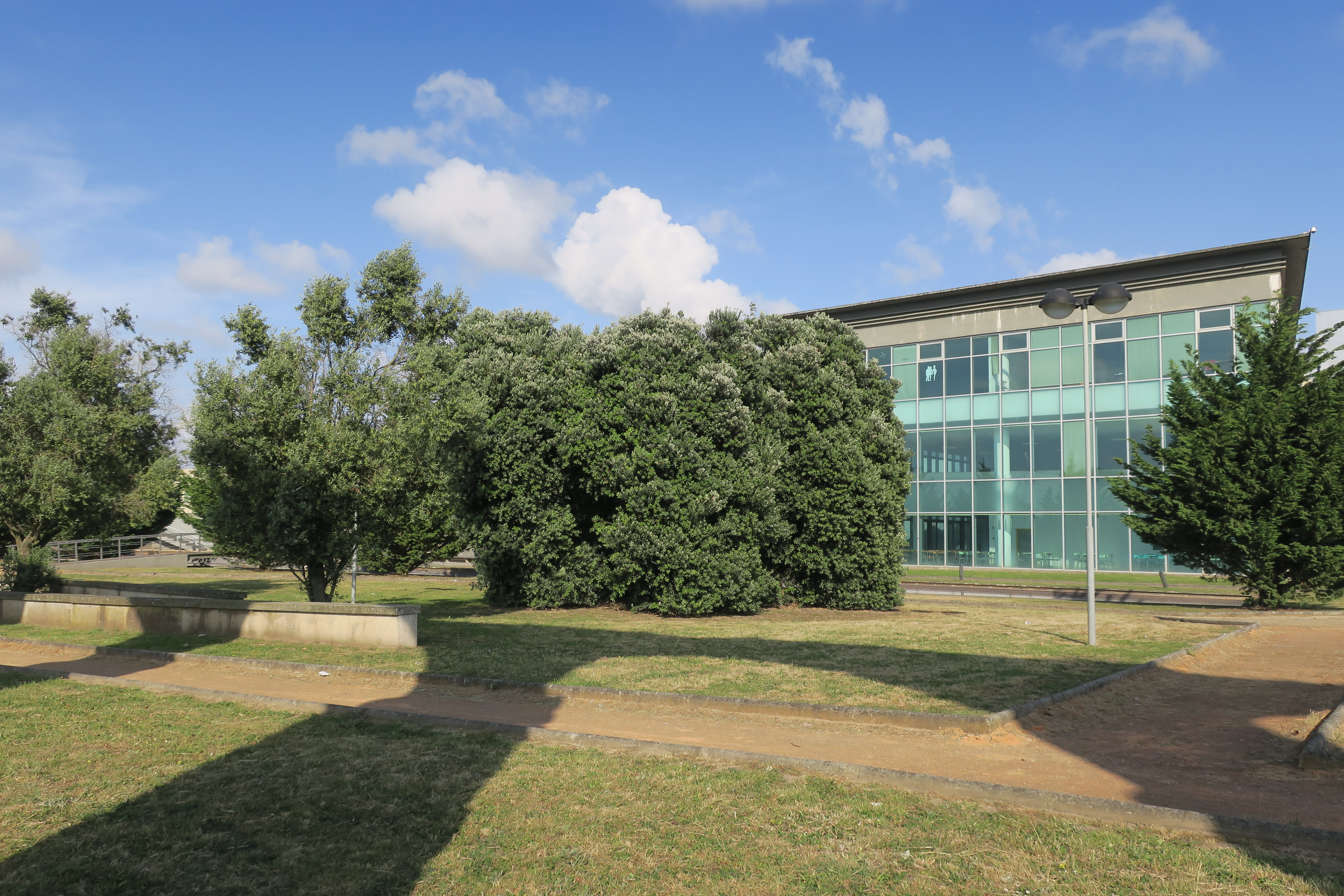
- Former names: School of Media Arts and Design (ESMAD)
- Type: Public university faculty
- Established: 1990 (as ESEIG), 2016
- Parent institution: Technical University of Porto
- Faculty: 101 (2025)
- Students: 817 (2025)
- Location: Póvoa de Varzim, Porto District, Portugal
- Campus: Campus 2
- Website: www.esmad.ipp.pt

The Faculty of Media Arts and Design (Faculdade de Media Artes e Design, FMAD) of the Technical University of Porto, formerly known as the School of Media Arts and Design (Escola Superior de Media Artes e Design, ESMAD), is a Portuguese public higher education institution specializing in cinema, audiovisual production, design, photography, multimedia, digital games, and web development. The faculty is located at Campus 2, situated on the border between the municipalities of Póvoa de Varzim and Vila do Conde.

== History ==
=== Origins as ESEIG (1990–2016) ===
The history of the institution traces back to 1990 with the creation of the Escola Superior de Estudos Industriais e de Gestão (ESEIG), established as a school of the Porto Polytechnic Institute (currently Technical University of Porto). Originally focused on industrial engineering, applied technology, and management, ESEIG moved its operations in 2001 to the newly constructed Campus 2 on the municipal border of Póvoa de Varzim and Vila do Conde. Throughout the 2000s, ESEIG progressively expanded its academic portfolio into digital media, graphic design, industrial design, photography, and web technologies.

=== Reorganization into ESMAD (2016) ===
In 2016, following a major strategic reorganization within the polytechnic university to specialize its regional academic offer, ESEIG was officially dissolved. Its operations and infrastructure were divided into two specialized organic schools operating at Campus 2:

- School of Media Arts and Design (ESMAD): Formed to inherit, consolidate, and expand programs in creative industries, visual arts, design, cinema, photography, and digital media.
- School of Hospitality and Tourism (ESHT): Created to house degrees in tourism, catering, and hospitality management.

Following this transition, ESMAD established four specialized academic departments (Image Arts, Design, Multimedia, and Informatics) and expanded its postgraduate and research initiatives, including the establishment of the uniMAD research unit.

=== Transition to Faculty Status (2026) ===
In 2026, amid legislative and structural changes in Portuguese higher education, the institution transitioned from its founding status as the School of Media Arts and Design (ESMAD) to become the Faculty of Media Arts and Design (FMAD), integrating as a faculty within the Technical University of Porto framework.

== Campus ==
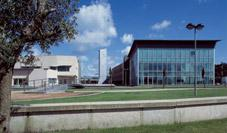
Campus 2 in early 2000s.

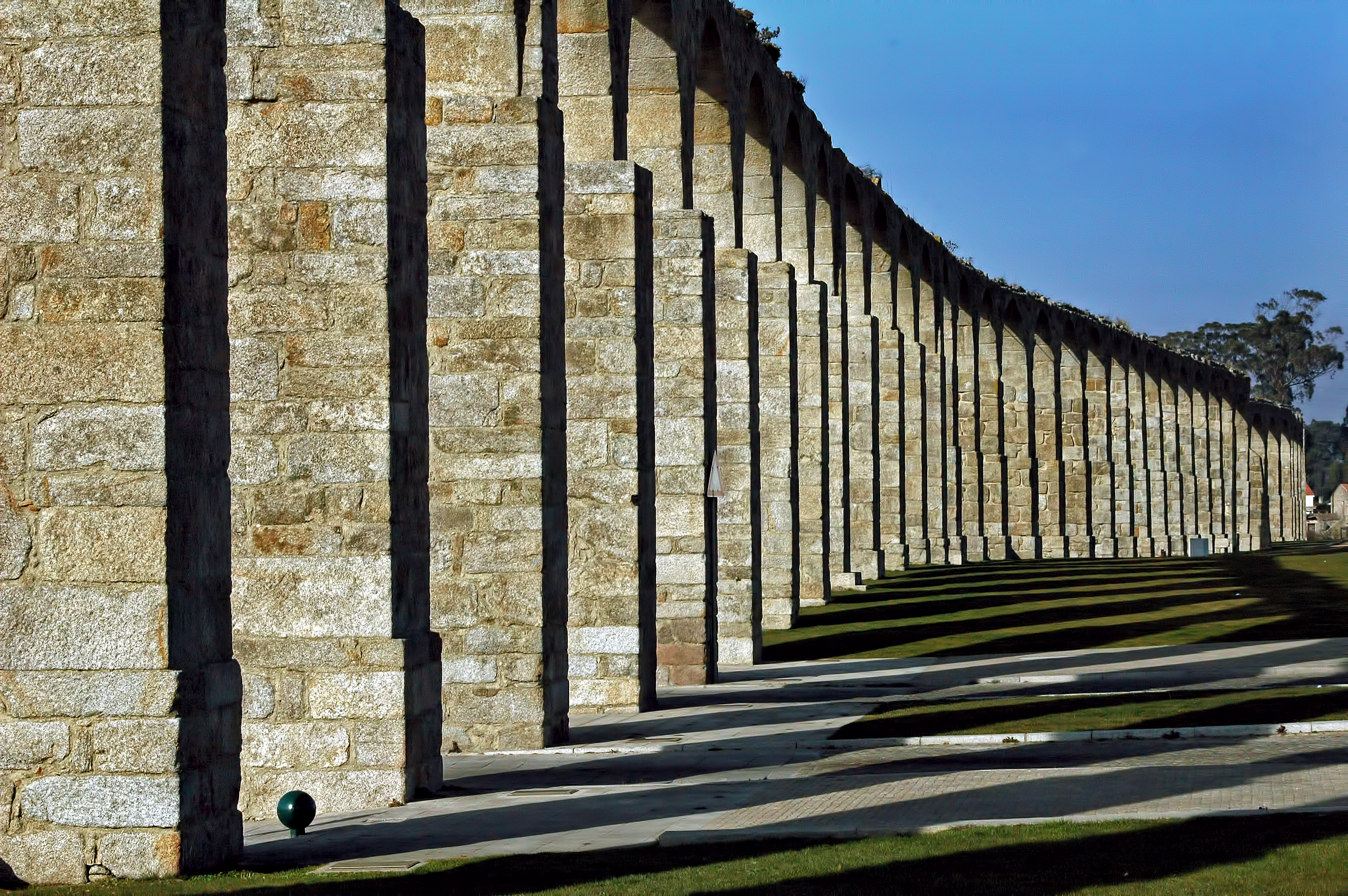
The historic Santa Clara Aqueduct bordering the grounds of Campus 2.

FMAD is hosted at Campus 2 of the Technical University of Porto (UTP), a purpose-built educational complex shared with the School of Hospitality and Tourism (ESHT). Located in Póvoa de Varzim at the border with neighboring Vila do Conde, the campus covers a total ground area of 31,544 m^{2} (339,540 sq ft) with 18,750 m^{2} (201,800 sq ft) of constructed floor area.

The architectural layout is aligned along a North–South axis, parallel to the remaining arches of a historic local aqueduct. The complex features four main functional blocks surrounding central plazas and landscaped outdoor spaces:

- South Building: Contains student support services, dining halls, cafeterias, student association offices, administrative centers, and the central campus library.
- East Building: Houses theoretical lecture halls and faculty offices, connected to the south building via an elevated pedestrian skywalk.
- West Building: Contains specialized practical laboratories, production studios, and technical computing units equipped for media and design instruction.
- North Building (Auditorium): Accommodates a major theater and auditorium venue for academic activities and public cultural programming.
- Central Features: The campus includes a landmark central tower, an open-air amphitheater, a landscaped park with an integrated lake, and parking structures.

To accommodate the growing student body and the technological demands of creative media instruction, Campus 2 has undergone successive infrastructure expansion and renovation projects. Supported by municipal partnerships and public funding from Porto Polytechnic, key structural additions include Block G, a modern media facility equipped with specialized television studios, a black box performance space, photography labs, and digital audio-video post-production suites. Ongoing development work continues to focus on refurbishing specialized laboratory infrastructure, improving energy efficiency across all functional blocks, and upgrading technical equipment to support advanced research and postgraduate studies.

=== Campus Library ===
The UTP Campus 2 Library provides a unified bibliographic collection supporting both FMAD and ESHT. Its catalogue covers specialized literature, technical references, and academic research relevant to media arts, design, informatics, hospitality, and tourism.

== Academics and Degree Programs ==
FMAD operates within the Bologna Process framework, offering undergraduate degrees (licenciaturas), Master's degrees, postgraduate diplomas, and Higher Professional Technical Courses (CTeSP).

FMAD adopts a laboratory-based educational model focused on employability, hands-on learning, and project-based teamwork. The institution combines technical training with artistic creation across disciplines such as graphic design, industrial design, interaction design, audiovisuals, photography, cinema, digital games, and web development. Its strategy emphasizes multidisciplinary collaboration, artistic awareness, and professional innovation.

Its academic programs are organized across four departments:

- Department of Image Arts (Departamento das Artes da Imagem): Cinema, audiovisual production, and photography.
- Department of Design (Departamento de Design): Graphic design, industrial design, and interaction design.
- Department of Multimedia (Departamento de Multimédia): Interactive media, digital games, and digital arts.
- Department of Informatics (Departamento de Informática): Web development and computational media systems.

=== Undergraduate Degrees ===
Undergraduate degree programs are offered on a full-time schedule across six main specialized tracks:

- Cinema and Audiovisual (Licenciatura em Cinema e Audiovisual – LCA): Combines theoretical instruction with creative and aesthetic tool applications.
- Design (Licenciatura em Design): Features specializations in Communication Design or Industrial Design, with student selection conducted via portfolio assessment and interview.
- Multimedia (Licenciatura em Multimédia): An interdisciplinary program combining arts, technology, communication, and culture.
- Photography (Licenciatura em Fotografia): Provides technical and artistic training for professional applications in photography.
- Technologies and Web Development (Licenciatura em Tecnologias e Desenvolvimento Web): Focuses on the conception, design, and development of web products and interactive media.
- Web Information Systems and Technologies (Licenciatura em Tecnologias e Sistemas de Informação para a Web): Emphasizes software engineering and product design for web applications.

=== Master's Degrees ===
Master's programs are delivered under mixed-time or after-labor (evening) schedules:

- Audiovisual Communication (Comunicação Audiovisual): Offers majors in *Photography and Documentary Film* or *Audiovisual Direction and Production*.
- Cinema and Photography (Cinema e Fotografia): Features specializations in *Documental and Experimental Cinema* and *Photography*.
- Design (Design): Focuses on graphic design with emphasis on experimentation, authorship, and multidisciplinary innovation.
- Interactive Digital Media / Interactive Media and Systems (Media Digitais Interativos / Media e Sistemas Interativos): Merges artistic creation with emerging technologies, covering virtual reality, augmented reality, and multimedia system design.

=== Postgraduate Programs ===
Specialized after-labor postgraduate certificates include:

- Interior and Space Design (Design de Interiores e do Espaço)
- Photography Preservation (Preservação Fotográfica)
- Screenplay (Roteiro / Guionismo): Advanced curriculum in creative writing for film, television, and digital media.
- Web Design (Web Design): Interdisciplinary specialization combining design, multimedia, and informatics.

=== Doctoral studies ===
The Faculty of Media Arts and Design participates in the Doctoral Programme in Artistic Creation, coordinated by the University of Aveiro in association with the Technical University of Porto and the University of Leiria and Oeste. The UTP's participating schools are FMAD and the School of Music and Performing Arts (ESMAE). The programme adopts a transdisciplinary approach to artistic creation, encompassing areas such as visual arts, sound arts, dance, theatre and music.

=== Higher Professional Technical Courses ===
Full-time technical short-cycle degrees (CTeSP) designed for vocational specialization:

- Design and Technologies for Mobile Applications (Design e Tecnologias para Aplicações Móveis – DTAM)
- Furniture and Spatial Design (Design de Mobiliário e do Espaço)
- Game Design and Digital Animation (Design de Jogos e Animação Digital)
- Motion Design and Visual Effects (Motion Design e Efeitos Visuais – MDEV)

== Admissions ==
Admission to FMAD's undergraduate degree programs for domestic and European Union students is managed primarily through the Portuguese National Competition for Higher Education Access (Concurso Nacional de Acesso), administered by the Directorate-General for Higher Education (DGES). FMAD consistently registers high applicant demand within public higher education. During national university entry procedures, the majority of its undergraduate programs reach a 100% occupancy rate in the first phase. Official data from the Ministry of Education, Science and Innovation indicates that degree programs across the university framework maintain a global enrollment rate of 98.9%.

Certain specialized degree programs in media, arts, and design require candidates to clear specific entrance conditions (pré-requisitos), which assess visual communication, artistic talent, and functional skills. Depending on the field of study, these entry evaluations include:

- Aptitude Tests and Portfolio Assessments: Practical examinations evaluating artistic ability, spatial reasoning, or creative design competencies.
- Functional and Technical Prerequisites: Specific physical, sensory, or communication capabilities required for practical studio work in areas such as audiovisual production, cinema, and photography.

Non-EU students can apply through the International Student Statute, which allocates dedicated application quotas for foreign applicants based on academic credentials, portfolio evaluations, or entrance exams.

FMAD also hosts international exchange students through the Erasmus+ mobility framework and bilateral cooperation agreements with partner universities across Europe, Latin America, and the Community of Portuguese Language Countries (CPLP).

== Research ==
Research associated with the Faculty of Media Arts and Design spans design, photography, cinema, communication and media, information technology, web technologies and digital arts. These fields provide a basis for interdisciplinary work combining artistic practice, technological development and media production.

The faculty's research activities have been associated with uniMAD, the Research Unit in Media Arts and Design. In 2025, the institution announced uniMAD's integration into ID+, the Research Institute for Design, Media and Culture, led by the University of Aveiro.

== Cultural activities ==
The Faculty of Media Arts and Design organises and participates in cultural activities that connect student work with the wider artistic and creative community. These include exhibitions of student projects, film screenings and participation in cultural events outside the institution.

The faculty's annual student showcases have included the presentation of short films at the Curtas Vila do Conde International Film Festival. Its RAVE exhibition presents final-year student projects in areas such as design, multimedia, photography, cinema and web technologies, with exhibitions held both at the school and in external cultural venues.

The school also hosts film-related initiatives involving external cultural organisations and international partners. In March 2026, it hosted MONSTRA Universitária, an extension of the Lisbon Animation Festival featuring animated films from international art and animation schools. In July 2026, the CINEPERFORM artistic residency brought together FMAD students and students from the Faculty of Arts of the University of Pristina to develop audiovisual projects collaboratively.

== Notable alumni ==
- João Gonzalez — Portuguese film director, animator and illustrator who graduated in Multimedia. His animated short film Ice Merchants won the Best Short Film award at the 2022 Cannes Critics' Week and the Best Animated Short award at the 2023 Annie Awards. It also became the first Portuguese production to receive an Academy Award nomination for Best Animated Short Film.
- Vier Nev (Xavier Neves) — Portuguese filmmaker and multimedia graduate. His short film A Mãe de Sangue (A Mind Sang) won the Young Portuguese Filmmaker Award at the 2019 CINANIMA International Animation Festival.
