= Escola Superior de Hotelaria e Turismo =

School of Hospitality and Tourism
- Escola Superior de Hotelaria e Turismo
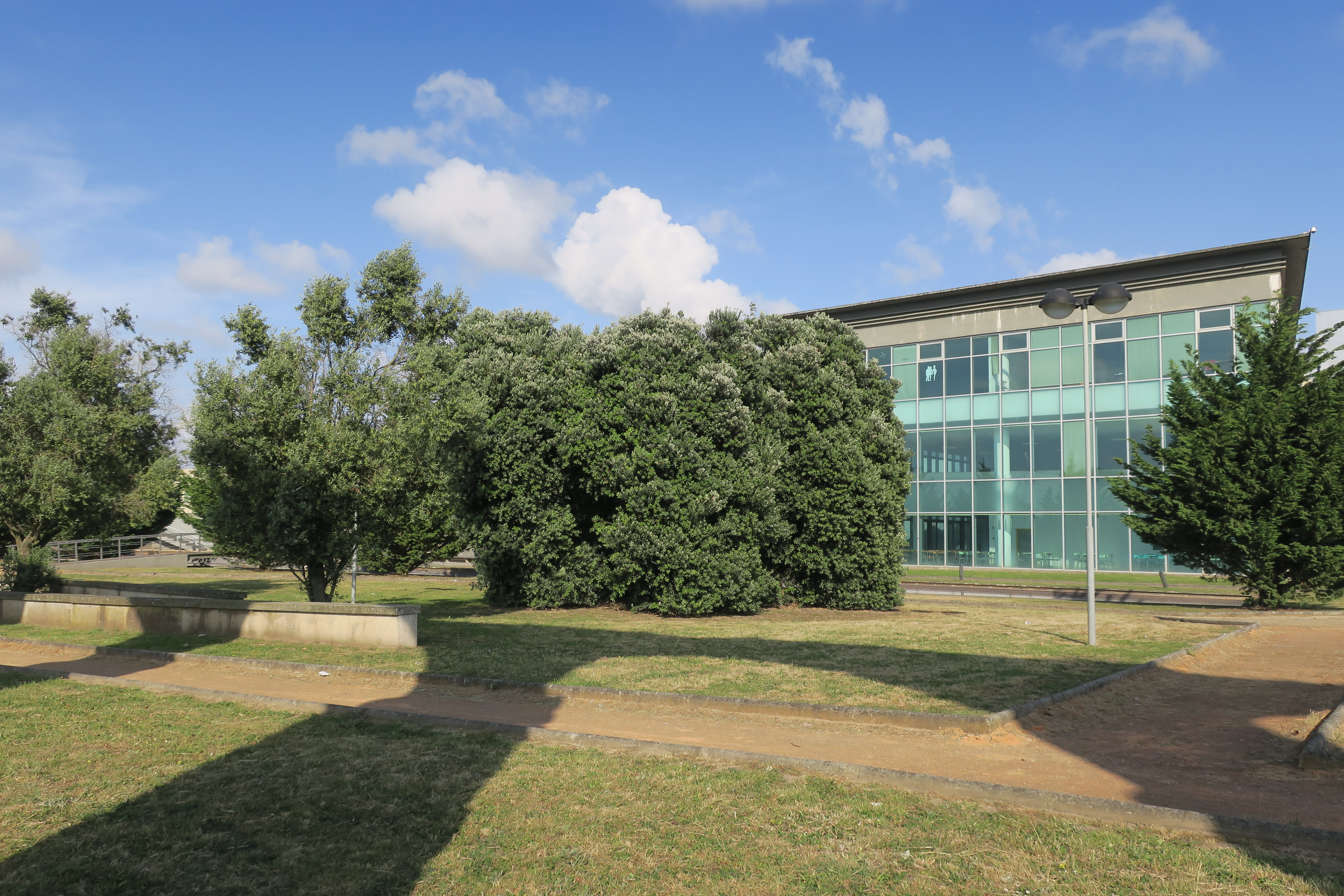
- Former names: School of Industrial and Management Studies (ESEIG)
- Type: Public polytechnic school
- Established: 1990 (as ESEIG), 2016 (as ESHT)
- Parent institution: Technical University of Porto
- Faculty: 71 (2025)
- Students: 784 (2025)
- Location: Póvoa de Varzim, Porto District, Portugal
- Campus: Campus 2
- Website: www.esht.ipp.pt

The School of Hospitality and Tourism (Escola Superior de Hotelaria e Turismo, ESHT) of the Technical University of Porto (UPT) is a Portuguese public higher education politechnic school specializing in hospitality management, tourism, and gastronomy. The school is located at Campus 2, situated in Póvoa de Varzim, at the border with Vila do Conde.

== History ==
The School of Hospitality and Tourism traces its institutional origins to the School of Industrial and Management Studies (Escola Superior de Estudos Industriais e de Gestão — ESEIG), established in 1990 as part of the Polytechnic Institute of Porto.

Initially operating from separate facilities in Póvoa de Varzim and Vila do Conde, ESEIG provided technical and management education aligned with the region's manufacturing, commerce, and service sectors, including traditional industries such as textiles, shipbuilding, and metalworking. In 2001, the two campuses were consolidated into a single site located on the boundary between the two municipalities.

Through this presence, ESEIG widened access to public higher education for families from the region's working-class and fishing communities, for whom studying outside the region could impose significant financial barriers.

Before its dissolution in 2016, ESEIG offered a multidisciplinary range of programmes, including web technologies and information systems, accounting and administration, design, biomedical engineering, industrial engineering and management, mechanical engineering, hotel management and human resources management. This broad academic profile reflected the school's role in providing technical and professional higher education in the region. By the later years of the ESEIG period, the school had established a sustained demand for its programmes beyond its immediate regional catchment area. In the first phase of the 2015 National Higher Education Admissions Competition, most of its undergraduate programmes filled all or nearly all available places, indicating a consistent level of demand across its diverse academic offer.

In 2016, the Polytechnic Institute of Porto reorganised ESEIG into two specialised schools: the School of Hospitality and Tourism and the School of Media Arts and Design. The restructuring redistributed the former school's academic activities across the institute. Engineering programmes were transferred to the Porto School of Engineering, while other programmes moved to the Porto Accounting and Business School. The new School of Hospitality and Tourism focused on hospitality, tourism and related fields, while the School of Media Arts and Design continued the media arts and design specialisations. The reorganisation prompted concern among ESEIG students and alumni about the loss of the school's established identity, the relocation of programmes and the financial implications for students and their families. The institute's leadership defended the changes as a means of reducing duplication and strengthening the organisation of its academic offer.

The reorganisation established the School of Hospitality and Tourism as a specialised school and it continues to provide polytechnic education and applied research in hospitality and tourism as part of the Technical University of Porto.

== Campus ==
ESHT is hosted at Campus 2, a purpose-built educational complex originally constructed in 2001 and designed by Porto architect Filipe Oliveira Dias. The campus is shared with the Faculty of Media Arts and Design (FMAD).

The School of Hospitality and Tourism is based in Block D of Campus 2, where its facilities include teaching rooms, showcooking areas, a central production kitchen, individual kitchens, a specialised pastry and bakery kitchen, a tasting room, food chemistry and microbiology laboratories, and an accommodation laboratory. The school also operates a training bar and restaurant, providing facilities for practical instruction in hospitality and food service. Some of its earlier restaurant and kitchen facilities in Block B remain operational. Campus 2 also contains shared facilities, including the Luís Soares Auditorium, the library, administrative offices, a canteen and a student bar.

A new student residence is also being developed as part of Campus 2, providing shared accommodation for students of the campus. the residence is located next to the School of Hospitality and Tourism and will have 174 beds in double rooms, adapted single rooms, and apartments for four students. Its circular design is set back 30 metres from the Santa Clara Aqueduct in order to respect the protected setting of the monument and integrate the building into the surrounding landscape.

=== Campus Library ===
The UTP Campus 2 Library offers a unified catalog supporting both ESHT and FMAD. Its collection covers specialized technical literature and academic research in hotel management, tourism, catering, food service, as well as media arts and design.

== Academics and Degree Programs ==
ESHT operates within the Bologna Process framework, offering undergraduate degrees (licenciaturas), Master's degrees, postgraduate diplomas, Higher Professional Technical Courses (CTeSP), and Specialized Higher Courses.

ESHT adopts a practical, applied learning approach ("hands-on") focused on high employability and professional readiness for the international hospitality and tourism industry. The school maintains strategic protocols and partnerships with major hotel chains and tourism companies, integrating real-context training models.

Extending its practical instruction, ESHT operates training activities at the **Porto School Hotel** (located in Baião), recognized as Portugal's first five-star school hotel, which provides immersive instruction in luxury hospitality, culinary arts, and beverage management.

=== Undergraduate Degrees (Licenciaturas) ===
Full-time undergraduate programs focusing on management and operational competencies:

- Hospitality Management and Administration (Gestão e Administração Hoteleira)
- Tourism Activities Management (Gestão de Atividades Turísticas)
- Catering and Restaurant Management (Gestão de Restauração e Catering)

=== Master's Degrees (Mestrados) ===
Master's level degree programs providing advanced training:

- Hotel Direction (Direção Hoteleira): Featuring specializations in *Health and Wellness Hospitality* (Hotelaria de Saúde e Bem Estar) and *Commercial Direction and Marketing* (Direção Comercial e Marketing).
- Tourism Management (Gestão do Turismo): Offered as a joint program with the School of Management of the Polytechnic University of Cávado and Ave (UPCA).

=== Postgraduate Programs ===
Specialized postgraduate training for industry professionals:

- Executive Financial Direction of Tourism and Hotel Enterprises (Direção Financeira de Empreendimentos Turísticos e Hoteleiros)
- Management of Rural Tourism Units (Gestão de Unidades de Turismo em Espaço Rural)
- Healthcare Units Management (Gestão de Unidades de Saúde)

=== Higher Professional Technical Courses (CTeSP) ===
Short-cycle vocational technical programs:

- Hotel Operations (Operações Hoteleiras)
- Restaurant and Catering Services (Serviços de Restauração e Catering)
- Tourism Animation (Animação Turística)
- Tourism and Tourist Information (Turismo e Informação Turística)

=== Specialized Higher Courses (Porto School Hotel) ===
Advanced technical programs delivered at the Porto School Hotel venue in Baião:

- Culinary and Innovation Management
- International Hospitality Management
- Wine and Beverage Service Management
