= School of Health of the Technical University of Porto =

School of Health
- Escola Superior de Saúde
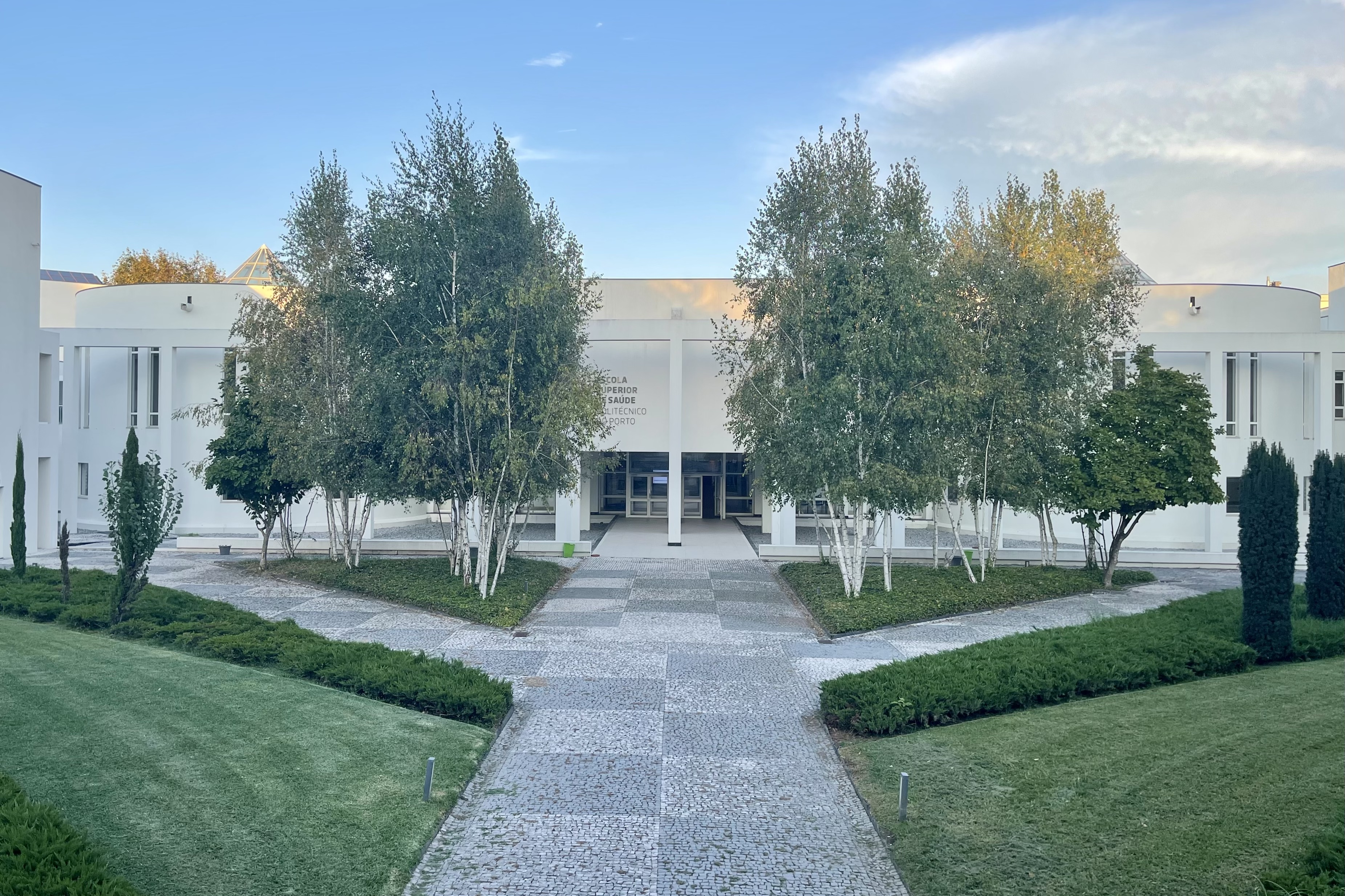
- Former names: Escola Técnica dos Serviços de Saúde do Porto, Escola Superior de Tecnologias da Saúde do Porto
- Type: Public polytechnic school
- Established: 1980
- Parent institution: Technical University of Porto
- Faculty: 438 (2025)
- Students: 3,222 (2025)
- Location: Porto, Porto District, Portugal
- Campus: Campus 1
- Website: www.ess.ipp.pt

School of Health of the Technical University of Porto (Escola Superior de Saúde da Universidade Técnica do Porto, ESS-UTP), institutionally branded as E2S, is a public higher education school dedicated to education, research, and community service in the health sciences and health technologies.

Located in Porto, it is one of the schools that historically formed the Polytechnic Institute of Porto before its structural transition into the Technical University of Porto framework.

== History ==
The institution originated in 1980 as the Escola Técnica dos Serviços de Saúde do Porto, established under the direct jurisdiction of the Portuguese Ministry of Health to formalize vocational training for Allied Health Professionals.

Driven by technological evolution in clinical diagnostic and therapeutic practices, the curriculum was integrated into the higher education system within the Polytechnic sector, changing its name to Escola Superior de Tecnologia da Saúde do Porto (ESTSP). In 2004, the institution joined the Polytechnic Institute of Porto (P.PORTO), receiving formal legislative recognition as an organic unit in 2006.

In 2016, the school changed its designation to Escola Superior de Saúde (ESS). In 2023, the institution adopted the acronym **E2S** as its official brand identity, modernizing its graphic line and institutional branding. Following higher education structural reforms, E2S was integrated into the Technical University of Porto as an organic health university school.

== Campus ==
E2S is situated within the Asprela University Campus (Pólo Universitário da Asprela) in northern Porto. The campus encompasses 10 functional buildings and specialized facilities:

- Building 1: Faculty offices, meeting rooms, Computer Center, Physiotherapy Gymnasiums, Occupational Therapy Laboratories, and general lecture halls.
- Building 2: Specialized laboratories for Audiology, Cardiopneumology, Neurophysiology, and Speech Therapy, alongside a multifunctional social area and cafe.
- Building 3: The Main Auditorium (Auditório Magno), secondary auditoriums, classrooms, Office of the Dean, Technical-Scientific Council, Pedagogical Council, and administrative support units.
- Building 4: Main Library and dedicated study rooms.
- Building 5: Students' Union headquarters, computer suites, and scientific laboratories for Clinical Analysis, Public Health, Pathology, Cellular Biology, Histology, Functional Sciences, Pharmacy, Environmental Health, Medicinal Biotechnology, Physics, Nuclear Medicine, Orthoptics, and Chemistry.
- Building 6: Main Food Court and dining infrastructure.
- Building 7: Classrooms and specialized laboratories for Radiotherapy and Radiology.
- Building 8: The E2S Pedagogical Clinic (Clínica Pedagógica E2S), Student Support Office, health laboratories, Center for Health and Environmental Research (CISA), Osteopathy laboratories, and the Health and Well-Being Studio.
- Porto Research and Innovation Health Unit (PRIHU): Acts Hall, main co-working hub, research laboratories, and the Center for Rehabilitation Research (CIR).
- Porto Research, Technology & Innovation Center (PORTIC): Classrooms and the Center for Translational Health and Medical Biotechnology Research (TBIO).

== Academics and Degree Programs ==
All academic cycles at E2S are structured according to the Bologna Process and accredited by the Agency for Assessment and Accreditation of Higher Education (A3ES).

According to Article 1 of the E2S Statutes (approved on 19 March 2018), the institutional mission of E2S is:

"...to contribute to the development of society, oriented towards the creation, transmission, and dissemination of culture and knowledge through education, research, and community outreach activities, in areas directly or indirectly related to health, within a national and international framework of reference."

The educational offerings include a preparatory "Year Zero" (Ano Zero), 10 Higher Professional Technical Courses (CTeSP), 14 Bachelor's degrees (Licenciaturas), 15 Master's degrees (including 3 joint programs), 2 proprietary Doctoral programs, 3 collaborative joint PhD programs, and non-degree continuing education programs. The curriculum covers specialized topics such as biosignal analysis, therapy implementation and rehabilitation methods, radiation application in medical imaging and treatment, biotechnological health processes, healthcare management, and environmental health and safety procedures.

=== Undergraduate Programs ===
Undergraduate degree programs are delivered primarily in daytime schedules with part-time study options. Most Bachelor's degrees require four years of study (240 ECTS), except for Medicinal Biotechnology and Digital Health, which have three-year durations (180 ECTS). Programs include:

- Audiology
- Biomedical Laboratory Sciences
- Cardiopneumology and Neurophysiology
- Dietetics and Nutrition
- Digital Health
- Environmental Health
- Medical Imaging and Radiotherapy
- Medicinal Biotechnology
- Occupational Therapy
- Orthoptics
- Physiotherapy
- Speech Therapy

=== Postgraduate and Doctoral Studies ===
Master's degrees span two academic years (120 ECTS) and are taught in daytime and evening regimes. Seven Master's programs offer track specializations at the end of the first year.

E2S participates in the Euro-Asian Master in Medical Technology and Healthcare Business (EMMaH), an international joint program funded by Erasmus Mundus and supported by the Franco-German University (UFA), delivered in consortium with the University of Lille (France), Hamburg University of Applied Sciences (Germany), and Taipei Medical University (Taiwan).

Doctoral programs (PhD) are offered through strategic protocols with regional and international partners, including the University of Porto, University of Vigo, University of A Coruña, and University of Salamanca.

=== Research Centers ===
E2S operates three primary research centers: 1. Center for Rehabilitation Research (CIR): Research on biomechanics, human movement, and physical therapy technology. 2. Center for Health and Environmental Research (CISA): Focused on public health, toxicology, environmental safety, and occupational hazards. 3. Center for Translational Health and Medical Biotechnology Research (TBIO): Based at PORTIC, specializing in molecular diagnostics, biotechnology, and health innovation.

== Student Life and Services ==
- E2S Pedagogical Clinic: A clinical-pedagogical infrastructure in Building 8 where students practice clinical skills under faculty supervision, delivering healthcare services directly to the surrounding community.
- Student Support Office (GAE): Provides individual psychological consultations, workshops, and career counseling to foster student well-being and academic retention.
- Mentoring Program (MESS): A peer-to-peer volunteer initiative coordinated by the Pedagogical Council and the Students' Union (aeESS) to integrate incoming students into academic life.
- Documentation and Information Service: Main library housing over 8,000 physical volumes along with specialized digital health database subscriptions.
- Academic Music Groups:
  - TunaTS – Founded in 1995, the official male academic tuna.
  - Tesuna – Founded in 1996, the official female academic tuna.
  - Grupo de Fados Salutaris – Founded in 2017, a traditional Fado ensemble.
