= Technical University of Porto =

P.PORTO

- Universidade Técnica do Porto
- Type: Public research university
- Established: 1852; 174 years ago (Escola Industrial do Porto); 1886 (Instituto Industrial e Comercial do Porto); 1985 (Instituto Politécnico do Porto); 2026 (Universidade Técnica do Porto)
- Academic affiliations: ATHENA
- Rector: Paulo Pereira
- Academic staff: 1.888 (2024)
- Administrative staff: 459 (2024)
- Students: 20.742 (2024)
- Undergraduates: 14.478 (2024)
- Postgraduates: 4.925 (2024)
- Doctoral students: 37 (2024)
- Location: Porto, Portugal; 41.18123°N 8.59668°W
- Website: www.utporto.pt

The Technical University of Porto (UTP, UT Porto; Universidade Técnica do Porto) is a public research university headquartered in Porto, Portugal. Educating more than 22,000 students (2026) across Greater Porto and Northern Portugal's industrial belt, the university specializes in engineering, technology, business, health sciences, education, hospitality, design, and the performing arts.

Comprising university faculties and specialized polytechnic schools, UTP maintains academic campuses in Porto, Matosinhos, Póvoa de Varzim, Vila do Conde, and Felgueiras. Its academic units include the historic Porto Institute of Engineering (ISEP), the Faculty of Business Sciences (FCEP), the Faculty of Media Arts and Design (FMAD), and the School of Health (ESS).

The university traces its origins to the Porto Industrial School founded in 1852 to foster regional industrial development through technical instruction. Evolving through the Industrial and Commercial Institute of Porto (1886) and the Polytechnic Institute of Porto (1985), the institution was reorganized into the Technical University of Porto in 2026, combining a century-old heritage of applied learning with a modern university model.

Characterized by a strong emphasis on technology transfer and applied innovation, UTP's research ecosystem spans artificial intelligence, autonomous systems, energy, health technologies, and creative practice. The university extends its international reach as the founding lead coordinator of the ATHENA European University Alliance.

Campus life at UT Porto is deeply rooted in Porto's academic traditions, national university sports, and vibrant cultural initiatives. The university maintains a diverse international community, welcoming degree-seeking and Erasmus+ students, while actively supporting student associations, artistic ensembles, and entrepreneurial projects across its campuses.

== History ==
=== Industrial and commercial origins (1852–1918) ===
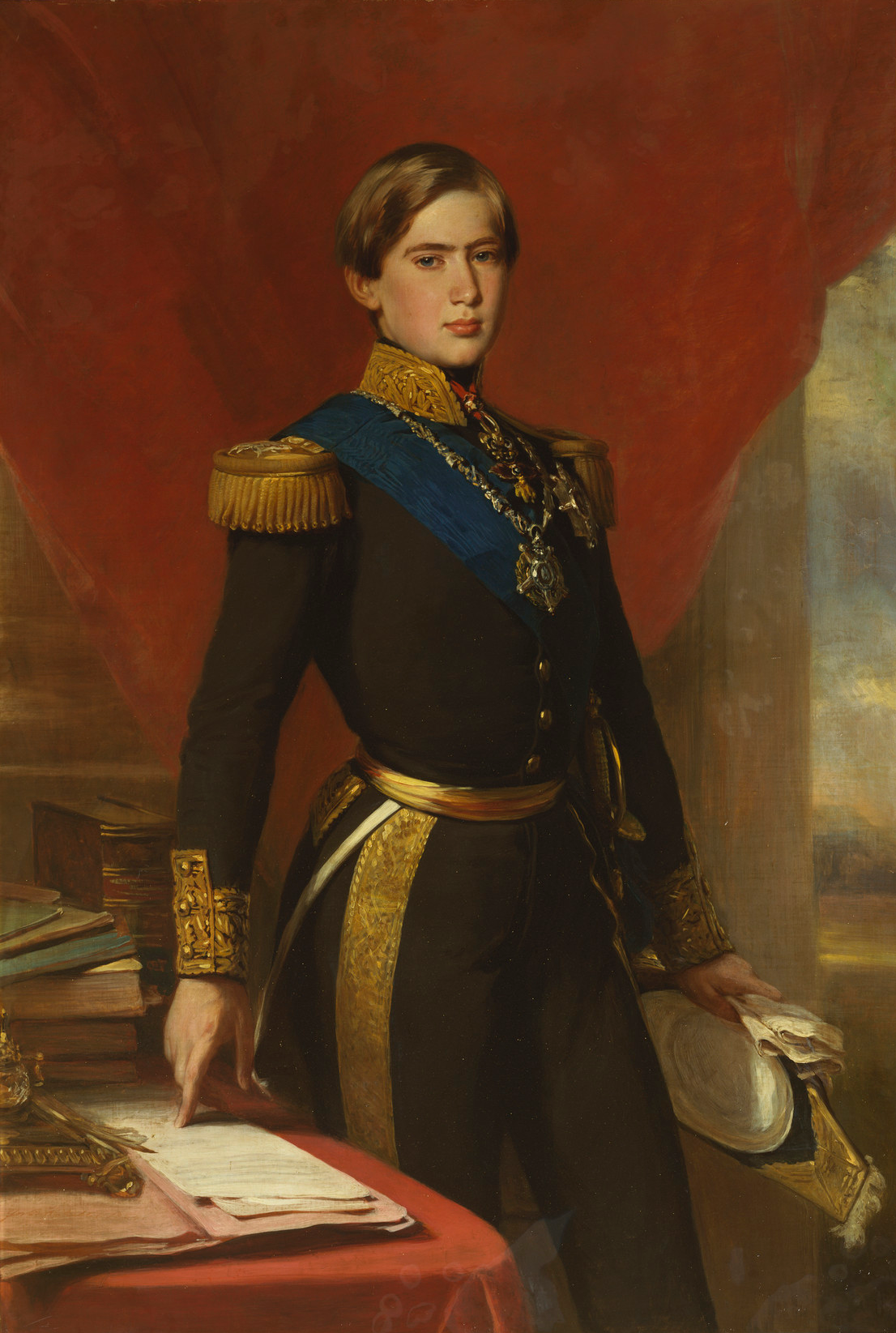
King Pedro V. Under his reign, the Porto Industrial School established the foundations of engineering education in Porto.

The Palácio da Bolsa, initial provisional seat of the Porto Industrial School in 1854; its Arabian Hall was later designed by architect and engineer Gustavo Adolfo Gonçalves e Sousa while serving as director of the school.

Founded by decree of Minister Fontes Pereira de Melo on 30 December 1852, the Porto Industrial School (Escola Industrial do Porto) was established to provide practical and experimental technical education, breaking away from the perceived theoretical model of the contemporary Academia Polytechnica to directly serve the needs of the emerging Industrial Revolution in Northern Portugal. The institution was structured around key applied departments, focusing heavily on technical drawing, mechanics, industrial chemistry, civil works, and commercial sciences to supply skilled directors, master craftsmen, and technicians for regional factories.

Patronized by King Pedro V, who advocated for vocational and scientific instruction over traditional scholasticism, the school operated in close proximity to Porto’s manufacturing and artistic sectors. The Porto Industrial School was inaugurated on 27 March 1854 in the physics classroom of the Polytechnic Academy. As renovation work was needed before classes could be installed in the Academy's building, the school temporarily used the headquarters of the Porto Industrial Association, which had initiated its establishment. In its initial decades, the school's evening courses in linear drawing, mechanics, and chemistry attracted a diverse cohort of students — including master builders, artisans, future industrialists, and prominent figures in Portuguese culture — shaping a practical technical elite that would design and construct the region's bridges, factories, and transport networks. Notable alumni include Silva Porto (1850–1893), a major figure in Portuguese Naturalist painting, who enrolled in industrial drawing in 1865, and José Joaquim Teixeira Lopes (1837–1918), a prominent sculptor who studied linear drawing at the school in the late 1850s.

Following its elevation to the Porto Industrial Institute (Instituto Industrial do Porto – IIP) in 1864, the institution solidified its role as a center for applied science and industrial leadership. Applied chemistry and mechanics laboratories catered to the expanding textile and footwear industries, while machine engineering courses supplied the region's growing metallurgy and foundry sectors. The Institute's practical orientation was reflected both in its links with public works and in its participation in international exhibitions. From 1879, its students could undertake practical work on projects carried out by the Public Works authorities. In 1876, the Institute had presented a mechanical lathe at the Centennial International Exhibition in Philadelphia, where it was awarded a medal of merit, demonstrating its technical knowledge and engagement with contemporary industrial technology. In 1884–1885, Josephina Baptista Azevedo da Cruz (b. 1864), a 20-year-old primary school teacher, became the first woman to enroll at the IIP, taking voluntary courses in Applied Physics, Applied Chemistry, and French and English.

During the late 19th century, institutional overlaps and spatial proximity spurred early proposals for consolidation. Both the Porto Industrial Institute and the Polytechnic Academy coexisted within the same building — occupying distinct left and right wings — while sharing faculty, laboratories, and classrooms. On 3 February 1882, the Academic Council of the Polytechnic Academy submitted a proposal to King Luís I for the creation of a unified "Polytechnic Institute of Porto" through their merger, citing the urgent need for educational reform, Northern Portugal's high population density, and the administrative hurdles of their shared infrastructure. However, the proposal was rejected by the IIP's School Council, led by Professor Guilherme de Parada e Silva Leitão, preserving the institutional independence of the industrial track.

Porto Industrial Institute, with physics and chemistry laboratories, technical drawing rooms and mechanical testing facilities, shared with the Polytechnic Academy, circa 1890.

Under a major educational reform introduced by Minister Emídio Navarro in 1886, the school was renamed the Industrial and Commercial Institute of Porto (Instituto Industrial e Comercial do Porto – IICP). This reform pioneered electrical engineering education in Portugal through dedicated chairs and laboratories in electrotechnics, while simultaneously expanding commercial education. This integrated commercial branch offered advanced studies in mercantile accounting, political economy, and modern languages, structuring the logistics and export networks crucial to Northern Portugal’s corporate ecosystem and the Port Wine trade.

While traditional institutions like the University of Coimbra and Porto's contemporary academies focused primarily on theoretical sciences and humanities, Porto Industrial Institute and its successor, the IICP, played an important role in technical education in Northern Portugal. The institutes trained a rising technical middle class — including factory directors, master builders, industrial chemists, accountants, and engineers — tailored specifically to the region's operational demands. Prominent alumnus António Almeida da Costa completed his technical training before founding the landmark Devesas Ceramic Factory (Fábrica de Cerâmica das Devesas), one of the largest industrial complexes in Northern Portugal. Concurrently, chemist António Joaquim Ferreira da Silva modernized the institution's laboratories in the late 19th century, pioneering advanced research in analytical chemistry and legal medicine that directly served regional industry and public health.

=== Technical Institutes and Industrialization (1918–1985) ===
Porto Commercial Institute, later ISCAP (left), which occupied the premises between 1933 and 1995; photographed c. 1900, when the building housed the Real Companhia Vinícola do Norte.

Following the 1918 division of the Industrial and Commercial Institutes of Porto, the Porto Industrial Institute and the Porto Commercial Institute (Instituto Comercial do Porto – ICP) became Northern Portugal's primary hubs for applied technical and vocational instruction. Throughout the mid-20th century, both institutes supplied the technical workforce — including site managers, surveyors, and practical engineers — essential for national public works and regional industrial growth.

Between the 1930s and 1950s, nationwide educational overhauls — most notably the Cordeiro Ramos Reform (Decree No. 20,419 of 1931) and the Law of Industrial Development (Lei de Fomento Industrial, Law No. 2,002 of 1945) — redefined technical instruction. The Porto Industrial Institute trained technical personnel responsible for managing the textile, metallurgy, and footwear factories concentrated across Northern Portugal, as well as technicians involved in major infrastructure projects, such as the regional electrical grid, railway connections, and the hydroelectric development of the Douro River basin. Concurrently, the Porto Commercial Institute provided advanced training in accounting, public administration, business management, and customs law, supporting Porto's commercial sector and port logistics at Leixões. However, from their 1918 division through the Estado Novo, their development was marked by legal subalternity and ongoing institutional tension with traditional classical universities, which limited their academic status and degree-granting autonomy.

The new IIP campus in Asprela opened in 1968, before its 1974 renaming as ISEP, capturing original buildings prior to later expansions.

Driven by regional industrial expansion and Portugal's opening to European markets through EFTA in the late 1960s, the technical institutes modernized their curricula to meet international standards. The move to a purpose-built campus in Paranhos in 1968, secured under the direction of Raul de Lima Aires (1957–1974), consolidated all operations after decades of spatial fragmentation, during which the IIP had split its activities between the historic building — shared with the University of Porto, successor to the Polytechnic Academy — and provisional facilities in the former Faculty of Letters building on Rua do Breiner. The new Asprela facilities provided expanded laboratories, workshops, and classrooms, positioning the Institute as a pioneer of Porto's primary university hub.

These developments laid the groundwork for the post-1974 democratic reforms that elevated both the IIP in 1974 and the ICP in 1976 into degree-granting higher institutes of engineering (ISEP) and accountancy (ISCAP). Explicitly rejecting the overly theoretical model of traditional classical universities — which the 1974 legislation criticized for failing national development needs — the reforms sought to establish a distinct, applied higher education paradigm rather than merely copying existing university structures. Under these founding diplomas, legacy professional diploma holders were recognized as holding a bacharelato (bachelor's equivalent) degree, with the institutes initially established as university-level schools and legally empowered to grant degrees up to the doctorate. These became restricted to three-year practical degrees in 1977 and the institutes began introducing post-graduate specialized diplomas (Diploma de Estudos Superiores Especializados – DESE) in 1988–1989, establishing a dedicated applied higher education track.

=== Porto Polytechnic (1985–2023) ===
Created in 1979 to modernize and relaunch polytechnic higher education in Portugal, the Polytechnic Institute of Porto (IPP) was formally constituted on 25 February 1985. Conceived along a university-style collegiate structure, the institute began operations through the School of Education (ESE) and the School of Music (later ESMAE), while laying the groundwork for the integration of the city's historic engineering and commercial institutes. The formal incorporation of ISCAP in 1988 and ISEP in 1989 united these century-old educational lineages under a single academic body. With these large legacy institutes, the IPP established itself by the late 1980s as the largest polytechnic in Portugal, a position of scale it maintained over the following decades.

Following Portugal’s accession to the European Economic Community (EEC) in 1986, Porto Polytechnic expanded to meet the growing demand for technical expertise across Northern Portugal's industrial belt — particularly in footwear, textiles, metalworking, and emerging information technology. It broadened access to higher education for working-class families and neighbouring industrial communities outside Porto's traditional university axis, relying on an applied model of mandatory internships, industry-linked laboratories, and direct partnerships with local businesses.

To support regional industries and advance territorial cohesion, the polytechnic decentralized its operations through dedicated regional campuses. The School of Industrial and Management Studies (ESEIG), established in 1990 with campuses in Póvoa de Varzim and Vila do Conde, served regional manufacturing, commerce and service industries, including textiles, shipbuilding and metalworking. Its campuses were consolidated at a site between the two municipalities in 2001, strengthening access to higher education for local working-class and fishing communities. In 1999, the School of Technology and Management (ESTG) extended this regional network to Felgueiras and the Tâmega e Sousa region, an industrial area dominated by small and medium-sized enterprises. Together, these campuses helped retain qualified talent within the coastal and interior manufacturing hubs, connecting the institute closely to regional industry through technical education, applied research and knowledge transfer.

The IPP also broadened its academic mission. Health education became a major component with the incorporation in 2004 of the Porto School of Health Technologies (later School of Health), whose origins lay in hospital-based training centres established in 1980 and incorporated into the polytechnic system in 1993. Parallel to this geographic expansion, IPP developed a broader applied research and innovation network across engineering, biotechnology, health, and social sciences. The implementation of the Bologna Process in the mid-2000s further restructured degree offerings, expanding second-cycle professional specialization through master's degrees, retaining the polytechnic emphasis on applied learning. By 2007–2008, the IPP enrolled 15,729 students across seven specialized schools.

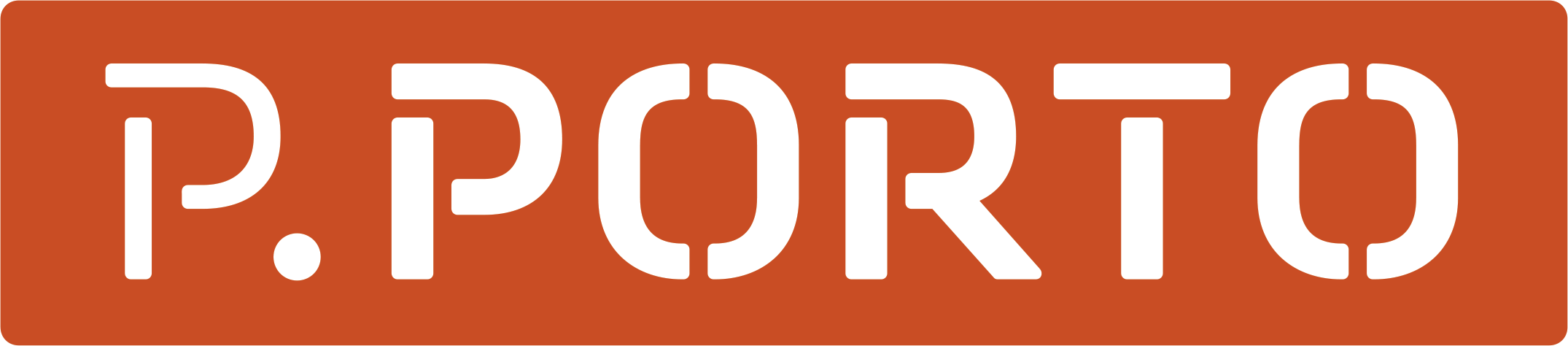
Institutional logos used by the Polytechnic Institute of Porto: an earlier IPP logo (top) and the P.PORTO brand (bottom).

In 2016, the institution reorganized Campus 2 by replacing ESEIG with two specialized schools: the School of Media Arts and Design (ESMAD) and the School of Hospitality and Tourism (ESHT). This reorganization gave the campus a more specialized profile while maintaining its role as a key higher-education hub between Póvoa de Varzim and Vila do Conde. Operating eight specialized schools across its campuses, Porto Polytechnic functioned as a large polytechnic university, ranking in 2016 as the fourth most sought-after higher education institution in Portugal, ahead of all other polytechnics and most classical universities. Around the same period, the institution adopted the unified public brand P.PORTO.

In 2018, the Technical School of Professional Higher Education (SETSP) was established to coordinate specialized professional higher-education diplomas (CTeSPs) across the institution. Two years later, the IPP joined as a founding member and lead coordinator of the ATHENA European University alliance, extending its international scope through cross-border education, joint research, and academic mobility in engineering and digital innovation. Through this trajectory, the Porto Polytechnic evolved from a initial nucleus of schools into a distributed multi-campus institution, seamlessly blending its century-old technical and commercial heritage with education in the arts, health, management, and technology, underpinned by an expanding global research footprint.

=== Transition to Technical University (2023–present) ===
Institutional banner marking 174 years of heritage and university status at the Technical University of Porto campus at ISEP.

The 2023 reform of Portugal's higher education framework enabled polytechnic institutions to award doctoral degrees and use the English designation "Polytechnic University". The Polytechnic of Porto (IPP) initially pursued this path, and the approval of its first doctoral programme in 2024 was described by the institution as a decisive step towards becoming a polytechnic university. By September 2024, three doctoral programmes had been accredited at ISEP. These programmes fulfilled the remaining requirement under Portuguese law for the IPP to qualify as a full university, with doctoral studies available in at least three different fields. The IPP subsequently pursued a more ambitious transformation, proposing the Technical University of Porto as an institution combining university faculties (~15,000 students) and polytechnic schools (~7,000 students). The proposal aimed to expand research and innovation, strengthen links with industry and the region, and diversify the educational offer. Developed in consultation with the institution's schools and academic community, it received unanimous approval from the General Council. On 28 February 2025, the IPP formally submitted the proposal to the Minister of Science, Technology and Higher Education.

On 17 July 2026, the Portuguese Government formally established the Technical University of Porto (UTP) through Decree-Law No. 145/2026, as the direct institutional successor to the IPP, assuming its existing rights, responsibilities, and operational framework. The reorganisation included transforming ISCAP into the Faculty of Business Sciences, ESE into the Faculty of Education, ESMAD into the Faculty of Media Arts and Design, and ESMAE into the Faculty of Performing Arts, while ISEP retained its historic name as the engineering faculty. Students of the IPP became students of the UTP, with their academic records transferred to the new university, including those of former students who had completed or interrupted their studies.

Over more than 170 years, the institution evolved from a 19th-century industrial school supporting the region's early industrialization into a comprehensive multi-campus university spanning engineering, business and management, health sciences, arts, education, and applied research, while integrating professional training with a strong regional and international footprint.

== Campus ==
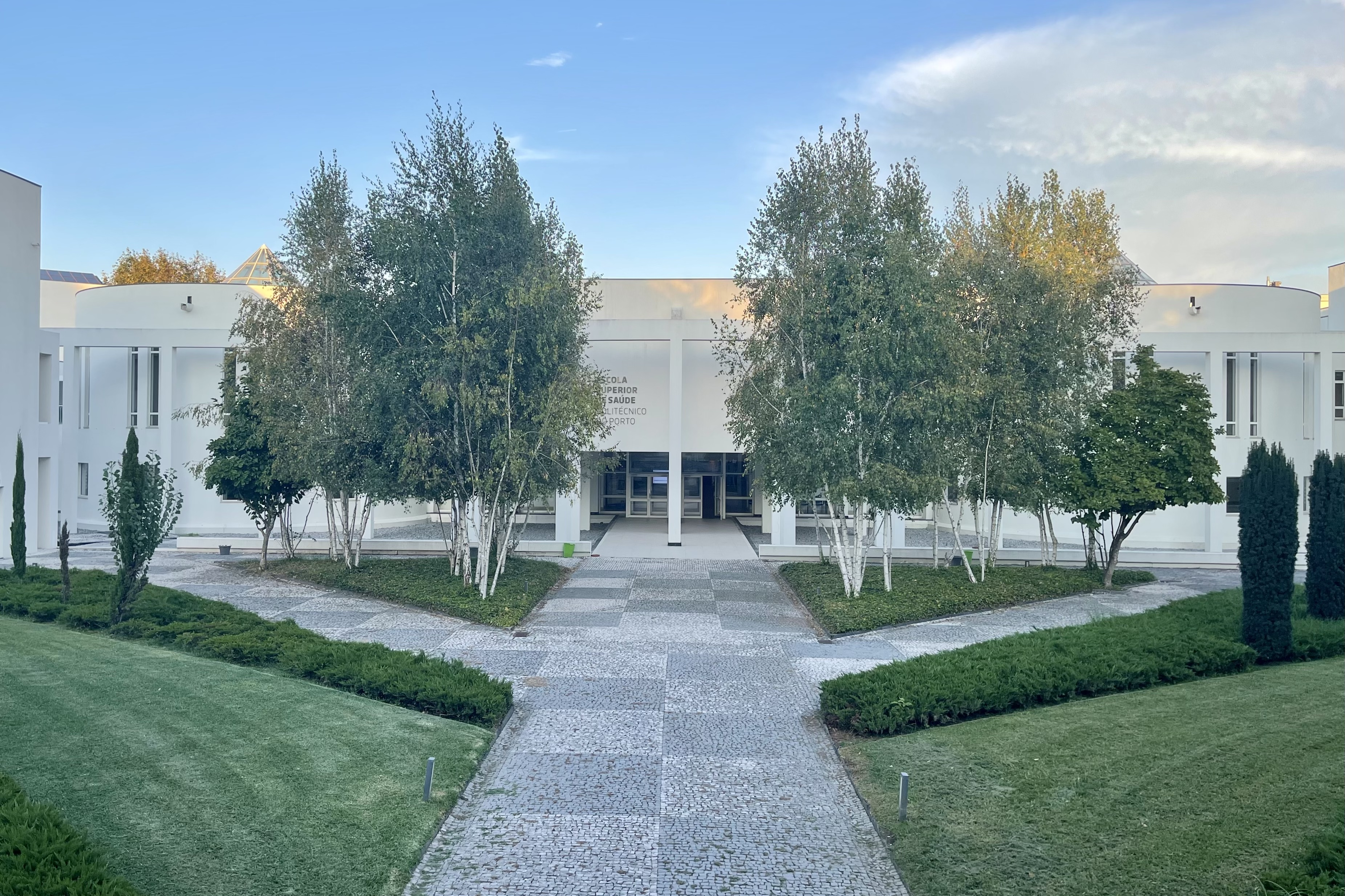
School of Health Sciences at Campus 1.

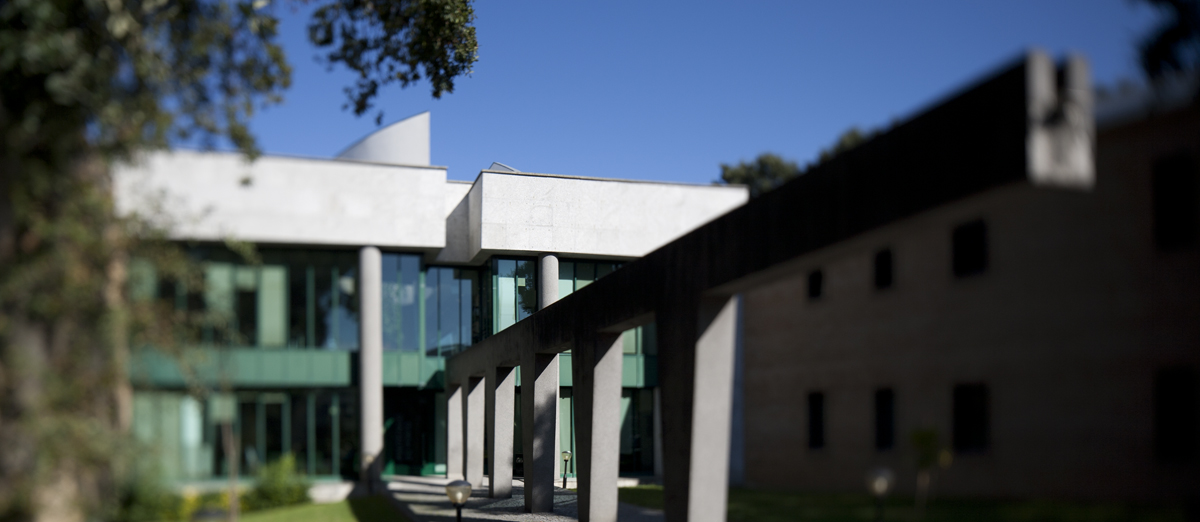
Rectorate of UT Porto.

The Technical University of Porto is officially structured across three major geographical campuses in Northern Portugal, bringing together its nine specialized schools:

=== Campus 1: Porto ===
Campus 1 is UTP's main campus, hosting over 15,000 students. It integrates the Institute of Engineering (ISEP), the Faculty of Business Sciences of Porto (FCEP), the Faculty of Education (FE), the Faculty of Performing Arts (FAP), and the School of Health (E2S). The campus also houses UTP's main research infrastructure, notably the Porto Research, Technology and Innovation Center (PORTIC), which serves as a central hub uniting multiple research groups, associated laboratories, and technology transfer units within a single physical facility. Integrated within this innovation ecosystem is the Porto Design Factory, an interdisciplinary platform within the Design Factory Global Network.

Campus 1 serves as the administrative, cultural, and intellectual hub of the institution. Its Central Services building and Central Library were designed in an integrated modern layout by architect Filipe Oliveira Dias. The Central Library anchors the university's library network, while the central complex displays UTP's contemporary art collection. Institutional heritage is further preserved by the accredited ISEP Museum (Museu do ISEP), which conserves a 170-year archive of scientific instruments and industrial equipment.

Situated directly within the Asprela Innovation District (Pólo Universitário da Asprela), Campus 1 forms part of Northern Portugal’s highest-density academic, medical, and technological corridor. The campus shares a contiguous urban footprint with several faculties of the University of Porto, the São João University Hospital (Hospital de São João), and major research centers such as INESC TEC and INEGI, fostering extensive cross-institutional research and clinical collaboration. Its infrastructure features high-performance computing clusters, advanced digital fabrication labs (FabLabs) at the Institute of Engineering and high-fidelity clinical simulation centers at the School of Health.

Away from the main campus cluster, the Faculty of Performing Arts (FAP) is geographically located in Porto's historic city centre. The school occupies a late 19th-century Neoclassical facility that originally housed the Escola Normal do Porto, the first purpose-built teacher training institution in the Iberian Peninsula. Between 1996 and 2000, the building was subject to an adaptive reuse project by Filipe Oliveira Dias, which preserved its original granite structure while inserting the modern Helena Sá e Costa Theatre into its central courtyard.

=== Campus 2: Póvoa de Varzim ===
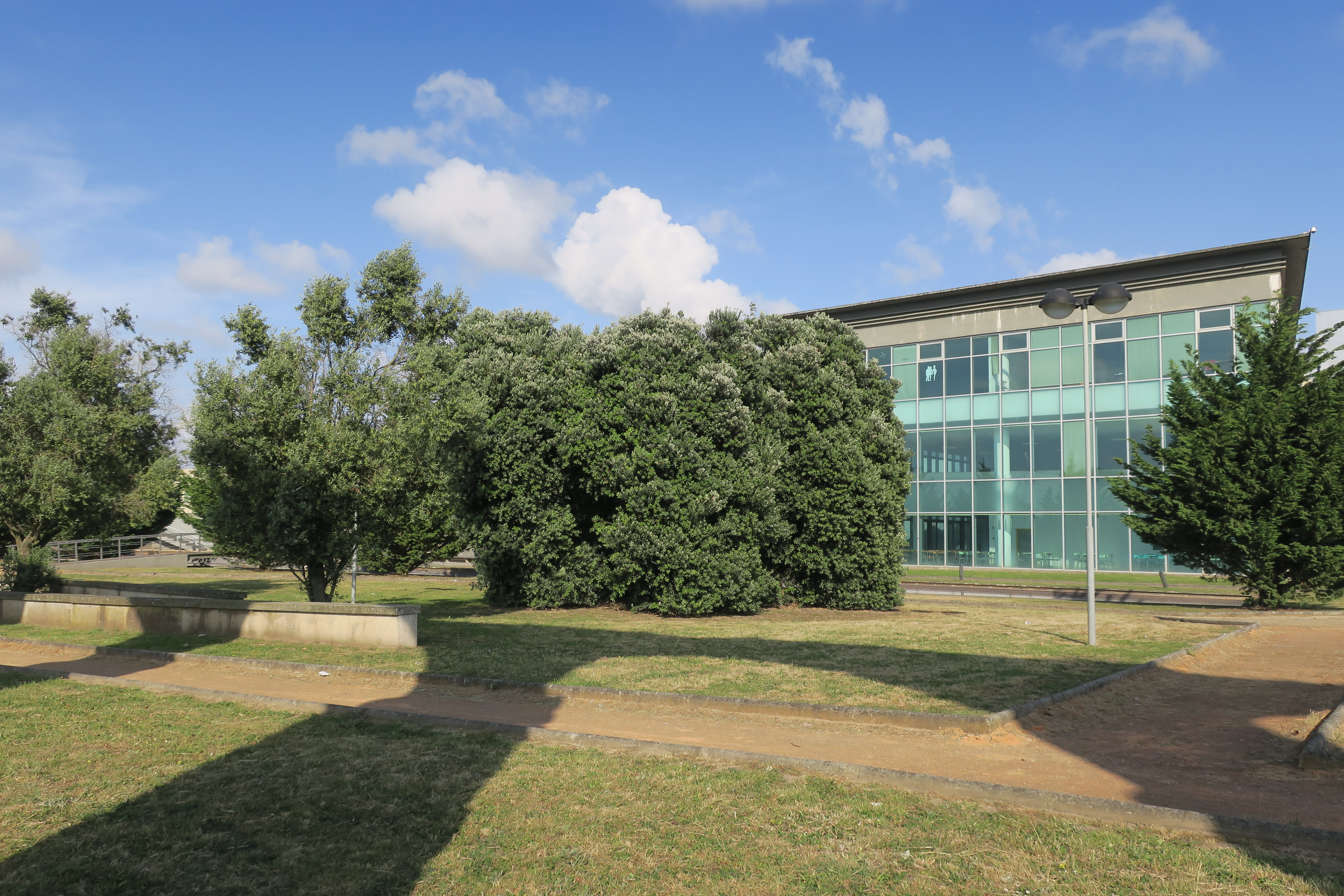
Campus 2 of UT Porto.

Located in Póvoa de Varzim on the municipal border with neighboring Vila do Conde, Campus 2 is home to the Faculty of Media Arts and Design (FMAD) and the School of Hospitality and Tourism (ESHT). The campus brings together teaching and research in creative industries, digital media, hospitality, and tourism. Originally designed by Portuguese architect Filipe Oliveira Dias, its architecture forms an integrated complex aligned with the nearby Santa Clara Aqueduct, with open plazas and distinct academic wings.

FMAD's facilities are centered on practical work in media arts and design, combining classrooms and project spaces with specialized facilities for photography, audiovisual production, multimedia, and digital fabrication. The campus includes the Luís Soares Auditorium and a dedicated studio complex with television and photography studios, a black box, and audio and video production facilities.

ESHT has facilities oriented towards practical training in hospitality and tourism, including teaching and production kitchens, showcooking spaces, pastry and bakery facilities, a tasting room for wine, olive oil, and coffee, food science laboratories, and an accommodation laboratory. Its application bar and restaurant provide a further setting for practical training and interaction with the community.

The campus also provides facilities and services shared by the two schools. These include the Campus 2 Library, with resources in design, media, and hospitality, as well as administrative and faculty offices, a canteen and bar, student associations, and the campus's female and male tunas.

A new student residence is also being developed as part of Campus 2, providing shared accommodation for students of the campus. The residence will have 174 beds in double rooms, adapted single rooms, and apartments for four students. Its circular design is set back 30 metres from the Santa Clara Aqueduct in order to respect the protected setting of the monument and integrate the building into the surrounding landscape.

=== Campus 3: Felgueiras ===
Located in Felgueiras in the Tâmega e Sousa region, Campus 3 is home to the School of Technology and Management (ESTG). The campus grew around the Casa do Curral, a historic building that now houses the school. The Casa do Curral is associated with Júlio Dinis's novel A Morgadinha dos Canaviais. The building had fallen into disrepair by the time the ESTG was established in 1999 and was restored in 2003 to a design by architect Filipe Oliveira Dias.

The campus has since expanded, adding teaching and technical facilities, the ESTG Library, computing facilities, and academic and student services. A recent expansion added further classrooms and technical facilities, as well as a multipurpose space, staff offices, and auditoriums.

A student residence is also being built next to the ESTG. The residence will provide 40 beds in 37 single rooms and three accessible single rooms.

The campus is also home to the CIICESI research centre and the Industry Business School (IBS), which offers postgraduate and continuing education programmes.

=== Student Housing ===
Student accommodation is coordinated through the university's Social Services (Serviços de Ação Social — SAS), which administers subsidized residences and student support services across the university's campuses. Accommodation is distributed across the Porto metropolitan area and Felgueiras, reflecting the university's multi-campus structure and providing options for students studying in different parts of the region.

Campus 1: Porto / Asprela: Student accommodation in Porto includes residences administered by the Social Services, including the Albergarias and Carmelitas residences. Additional public accommodation capacity has been developed through the S. Roque da Lameira Residence. These residences primarily serve students eligible for social support and those studying away from their home region, and provide facilities including study areas and communal services.

Campus 2: Póvoa de Varzim / Vila do Conde: Students at Campus 2 have access to Social Services accommodation in Vila do Conde, including the José Régio and São Roque residences. Accommodation in Póvoa de Varzim has also expanded through the Academia 24 residence, operated by the Academic Federation of Porto (FAP) in partnership with the municipality. The area is connected to Porto and the wider metropolitan area by the Metro do Porto and UNIR public transport networks.

Campus 3: Felgueiras: Student accommodation is being developed alongside Campus 3 through the university's Social Services. A dedicated residence was planned for the ESTG campus under the national higher-education accommodation programme, with capacity for 40 students, primarily serving those relocating from outside the region.

=== Transport and Connectivity ===
Transit networks are tailored to the distinct urban and regional characteristics of each campus location:

Campus 1: Porto / Asprela: As part of Porto's major academic hub, Campus 1 is fully integrated into the city's heavy public transit infrastructure. It is served directly by Line D (Yellow Line) of the Porto Metro as well as a dense network of STCP urban bus routes. This provides rapid transit links to downtown Porto, Campanhã railway station, and direct connections to Francisco Sá Carneiro International Airport (OPO).

Campus 2: Póvoa de Varzim / Vila do Conde: Situated directly at the intersection of Northern Portugal's primary coastal transit networks, Campus 2 sits along Line B (Red Line) of the Porto Metro, making it an easy commute for students residing anywhere in Vila do Conde, Póvoa, or even the northern suburbs of Porto. Road transit is heavily supported by major highway arteries, notably the A28 (connecting Greater Porto to Northern Galicia in Spain) and the A7 (linking the coastal belt to the Minho region and deep interior of Northern Portugal). Local mobility is further enhanced by flat coastal terrain, making bicycles and walking primary modes of daily transport.

Campus 3: Felgueiras: Unlike the metro-connected coastal campuses, transport in Felgueiras is tailored to regional road travel and short local commutes. It serves primarily local and regional commuters via key highway links (A42 and A11) and intercity bus routes across the Tâmega e Sousa district.

== Academics ==
UTP offers higher education qualifications fully integrated within the European Higher Education Area (Bologna Process) framework, spanning undergraduate degree programmes (licenciaturas), master's degree programmes (mestrados), and doctoral degrees (doutoramentos), alongside specialized postgraduate diplomas and higher professional technician courses (CTeSP). Its academic provision spans engineering, business, education, health sciences, arts, industrial design, hospitality, and technology, with a particular emphasis on applied research models developed in partnership with industry.

=== Faculties and schools ===
The Technical University of Porto's academic provision is organized through eight schools distributed across three campuses, most of which are based in the Asprela university district of Porto. The university combines university-level education, delivered by faculties, and polytechnic higher education, delivered by polytechnic schools. The schools span a range of disciplines, from engineering, business and technology to education, health sciences, hospitality, media arts and design, and the performing arts. Undergraduate programmes are offered across the eight schools, while postgraduate and doctoral provision varies according to each school's academic fields. Higher professional technical courses (CTeSP) are also offered through the schools, providing shorter, professionally oriented pathways into higher education.

Institution	Students (2024/2025)	Academic Staff (2024/2025)	Campus	Location	Type
Porto Institute of Engineering (ISEP); Department of Civil Engineering; Department of Electrical Engineering; Department of Geotechnical Engineering; Department of Computer Engineering; Department of Mechanical Engineering; Department of Chemical Engineering; Department of Physics; Department of Mathematics; Department of Organization and Management	7,013	567	Campus 1	Porto (Asprela)	Faculty
Porto Faculty of Business Sciences (FCEP; former ISCAP); Scientific areas including Accounting, Economics, Languages, Management, Marketing, and Information Systems	4,374	234	Campus 1	Matosinhos (Asprela)	Faculty
Faculty of Education (FE; former ESE); 11 Technical-Scientific Units, including Educational Sciences, Social Sciences, Languages and Communication, Arts, and Physical Education	2,011	174	Campus 1	Porto (Asprela)	Faculty
Faculty of Performing Arts (FAP; former ESMAE); Department of Music; Department of Theatre	657	136	Campus 1	Porto (Downtown)	Faculty
Faculty of Media Arts and Design (FMAD); Department of Image Arts; Department of Design; Department of Informatics; Department of Multimedia	817	101	Campus 2	Póvoa de Varzim	Faculty
School of Health (ESS); 22 Technical-Scientific Areas, including Clinical Analysis and Public Health, Audiology, Physiotherapy, Pharmacy, Radiology, Speech Therapy, and Occupational Therapy	3,222	438	Campus 1	Porto (Asprela)	Polytechnic School
School of Hospitality and Tourism (ESHT); Department of Hospitality and Catering; Department of Humanities; Department of Business and Administration; Department of Information Systems and Mathematics; Department of Tourism and Leisure	784	71	Campus 2	Póvoa de Varzim	Polytechnic School
School of Technology and Management (ESTG); Department of Business Sciences; Department of Legal and Social Sciences; Department of Natural and Exact Sciences; Department of Informatics; Department of Safety, Health and Environment	1,864	139	Campus 3	Felgueiras	Polytechnic School
Technical Professional School; Higher Professional Technical Courses (CTeSP) offered through all eight constituent schools	N/A	N/A	Multi-campus	Various locations	Polytechnic School

The Porto Institute of Engineering, originally founded as the Porto Industrial School in 1852 as part of the development of public industrial education in Portugal. It became the largest school in the Portuguese polytechnic sector after joining the Porto Polytechnic Institute. In 2024, it launched the institute's first doctoral programme, in Artificial Intelligence and Intelligent Systems Engineering, marking an important expansion of its role in advanced research and doctoral education.

The Porto Faculty of Business Sciences, formerly known as ISCAP, continues a tradition of commercial and accounting education dating to 1886. Accounting and Administration remains one of its long-established degree programmes, alongside a broader portfolio in business-related fields, including management, finance, marketing and information systems.

The Faculty of Education offers degree programmes in teacher education, social education and intervention, visual arts, sport, languages, cultural heritage management, and Portuguese Sign Language translation and interpretation. It continues Porto’s teacher-training tradition dating back to the Escola Normal do Porto (established in 1882), whose historical library and documentary collections it preserved. The former Normal School’s historic 1885 building now serves as the seat of the Faculty of Performing Arts (ESMAE). Established in 1985 as the School of Music, ESMAE later expanded its curriculum to theatre and dance, and includes the Helena Sá e Costa Theatre as its principal performance venue.

The School of Health offers programmes across a broad range of health sciences, including medical imaging, rehabilitation, biomedical technologies and health services management. It is the largest polytechnic higher education institution specializing in health sciences in Portugal. Its activities combine professional education with applied research and community services.

The Faculty of Media Arts and Design offers programmes spanning cinema, audiovisual production, photography, graphic and industrial design, and multimedia. Its educational approach combines technical training with artistic practice and authorial expression, supported by specialised facilities. The School of Hospitality and Tourism specialises in hospitality, tourism and related services. Both schools are based at Campus 2, in Póvoa de Varzim, on the approach to Vila do Conde. The School of Technology and Management, based in Felgueiras, offers programmes in technology and management, with an academic profile shaped by the needs of the surrounding industrial economy.

=== Undergraduate studies ===
Undergraduate education forms the foundational pillar of UTP's academic offering, comprising 63 three-year licenciatura programmes fully aligned with the Bologna framework and awarded upon the completion of 180 ECTS credits. The programmes span engineering and technology, business, education, health sciences, media and design, tourism and hospitality, and the performing arts. Instruction is predominantly delivered through semester-based coursework, combining theoretical lectures with laboratory practice, studio work, and mandatory industry or institutional internships in the final year. Academic performance is assessed on a national 0-to-20 grading scale, with a minimum score of 10 required to pass. Most students are admitted through the National Competition for Access to Higher Education (CNAES), while the Faculty of Performing Arts admits students to its music and theatre programmes through a separate local admission competition involving practical auditions.

In 2026, the largest undergraduate programmes admitted through the national competition were Accounting and Administration at FCEP (220 seats), Computer Engineering at ISEP (201), Electrical and Computer Engineering at ISEP (176), Basic Education at the Faculty of Education (120), and Mechanical Engineering at ISEP (120). Other large programmes included Marketing (90) at FCEP, Physiotherapy (70) at ESS, Computer Engineering at ESTG (70), Tourism Activities Management at ESHT (63), and Biomedical Laboratory Sciences at ESS (61). At the Faculty of Performing Arts, Music, Instrument and Singing was the largest undergraduate programme by number of places, with 73 places offered through the local admission competition.

Admission thresholds vary substantially across disciplines, reflecting regional demand and secondary school entrance examination requirements. Admission to several programmes is highly competitive, with minimum entry scores therefore approaching the 200-point maximum and overall student demand consistently outstripping available capacity across engineering, business, health, and education fields. Among the highest minimum entry scores for admitted students in the general contingent in the first phase of 2026 were Industrial Engineering and Management (181.0 out of 200) at ISEP, Management (178.0) at FCEP, Multimedia (174.0) at FMAD, Visual Arts and Artistic Technologies (174.0) at the Faculty of Education, Mechanical Engineering (169.0) at ISEP, Business Communication (168.0) at FCEP, and Physiotherapy (167.0) at ESS. In addition to standard CNAES applicants, UTP reserves dedicated quotas for international students, mature candidates over the age of 23, and graduates of higher professional technical courses (CTeSP), facilitating non-traditional academic progression pathways.

=== Postgraduate studies ===
UTP's postgraduate provision encompasses both second-cycle master's degree programmes (mestrados) and non-degree postgraduate diplomas (pós-graduações), representing the core of its advanced professional education. Comprising 82 master's programmes fully integrated into the Bologna framework, the university offers specialized academic and research tracks across engineering, business analytics, health sciences, media design, performing arts, and education.

Designed in close alignment with regional industry, these master's programmes emphasize practical innovation through industry-based dissertations, applied research projects, and corporate or clinical internships. Complementing its degree offerings, UTP provides non-degree postgraduate certificates and executive specialization courses tailored for professional retraining, skill upgrading, and lifelong learning. The university also participates in joint master's programmes through APNOR (Associação de Politécnicos da Região Norte), a network of polytechnic institutions in Northern Portugal.

Some master's programmes also include international double-degree arrangements. At ISEP, these have included cooperation with the Polytechnic University of Madrid, Paraná Federal University of Technology and Mackenzie Presbyterian University, while the Faculty of Business Sciences has established double-degree arrangements with the Miguel Hernández University of Elche and Chouaïb Doukkali University.

=== Doctoral studies ===
UTP's doctoral provision is characterized by an emphasis on applied science, technology, and practice-based research, reflecting the specialized research ecosystems of its constituent faculties and a focus on models developed in partnership with industry and real-world environments.

At the Porto Institute of Engineering (ISEP), doctoral degrees are closely integrated with its research units, including the CISTER Research Centre in Real-Time and Embedded Computing Systems and the Autonomous Systems Laboratory (LSA). Its Doctorate in Artificial Intelligence and Intelligent Systems Engineering was among the first dedicated applied AI doctoral degrees accredited in Portugal, focusing on machine learning, autonomous systems, and industrial AI applications. ISEP also offers doctorates in Electrical and Computer Engineering, centered on smart grids and cyber-physical systems; Analytical Chemistry and Environmental Sustainability Engineering; and Mechanical Engineering and Sustainable Production, aligning doctoral research with Industry 4.0 technologies and the green transition.

The School of Health launched a Doctorate in Translational Health, designed to connect fundamental research with applications in healthcare, population health, and the bioindustries, and organized into three specializations: Medical Metabolomics and Biotechnology, Translational Neurosciences, and Healthy Environments and Lifestyles. The programme is integrated with the Translational Health and Medical Biotechnology Research Centre (TBIO).

In the creative arts and humanities, the university pioneered practice-based doctoral degrees in Portugal. The Faculty of Performing Arts offers a doctorate in Music — Artistic Practices in the Portuguese Context, where artistic performance, electroacoustic composition, and musical heritage preservation serve as primary research methodologies. Additionally, the Faculty of Performing Arts collaborates with the Faculty of Media Arts and Design on the Doctoral Program in Artistic Creation, leveraging Campus 2's media arts, interaction design, and digital media production infrastructure to support research combining cinema, digital arts, and interdisciplinary performance.

Doctoral candidates across UTP have access to national FCT doctoral grants, Horizon Europe projects, and industry-sponsored R&D funding. Research infrastructure includes CISTER's cyber-physical systems facilities, LSA's autonomous robotics testbeds, FMAD's digital media studios, and FAP's electroacoustic laboratories. Through the ATHENA European University Alliance, doctoral researchers can also participate in joint supervision and cross-border research stays.

=== Higher professional courses ===
Alongside its degree programmes, UTP offers 43 Higher Professional Technician Courses (Cursos Técnicos Superiores Profissionais, CTeSP), representing two-year tertiary vocational qualifications (EQF Level 5) established under national legislative frameworks.

Designed to address regional skill shortages and support industrial modernization across Greater Porto and the Northern industrial corridor, these programmes integrate technical coursework with a mandatory six-month workplace internship in partner companies. CTeSP graduates earn a higher professional diploma (diploma de técnico superior profissional) and gain direct access to the institution's undergraduate licenciatura degree programmes through dedicated competitive entry pathways.

=== Admissions ===
National Admissions Rankings (1st Phase — 29 Institutions)
Category	2024	2025	2026

Polytechnic Universities
Initial Vacancies	1st	1st	1st
Occupancy Rate	1st	1st	1st

All Universities
Initial Vacancies	4th	4th	5th (Note: Ranked 5th if ESHTE vacancies are merged into NOVA University Lisbon; ranked 4th in the separate institutional classification of the Ministry of Education.)
Occupancy Rate	2nd	6th	2nd

Admissions to first-cycle undergraduate programs (licenciaturas) are managed primarily through the Portuguese national contest for access to higher education (Concurso Nacional de Acesso ao Ensino Superior — CNAES), in which the university maintains one of the highest applicant demand profiles in Portugal. In 2026, the institution recorded a 98.92% occupancy rate in the first phase of the 2026 National Higher Education Admissions Competition (CNAES), with 3,212 students placed for 3,247 initial places. This was the second-highest occupancy rate among higher-education institutions nationally, placing the institution ahead of the University of Lisbon and other major universities and behind only the University of Porto.

Specialized entry routes are also available for mature applicants (over-23 track) and professional technical diploma holders. Under the International Student Statute (EEI), international undergraduate applicants apply through dedicated institutional quotas, with admissions evaluated through recognized equivalencies such as the Brazilian ENEM or standardized country-specific secondary examinations.

Postgraduate admissions for second-cycle master's degrees and third-cycle doctoral programs are managed directly by individual faculties through localized application processes. Candidates are evaluated based on academic transcripts, professional portfolios, and research proposals. To foster internationalization, several postgraduate programs — particularly in fields such as Artificial Intelligence, Informatics, Embedded Computing Systems, Corporate Management, and Health Technologies — are offered fully or partially in English. International students also benefit from joint and double-degree pathways established through global academic partnerships and the ATHENA European University Alliance, facilitating cross-border credit transfer and mobility.

=== Accreditations ===
Academic programs across the institution hold several national and international quality accreditations. In engineering, multiple degree programs at the Institute of Engineering (ISEP) have been awarded the international European Accredited Engineer (EUR-ACE) quality label, certified through the European Network for Accreditation of Engineering Education (ENAEE) and the Portuguese Order of Engineers (Ordem dos Engenheiros). ISEP's engineering degrees also include courses recognised by the Portuguese Order of Technical Engineers (Ordem dos Engenheiros Técnicos, OET) as providing access to the profession of technical engineer. ISEP itself was named an Honorary Member of the OET in 2017 for its contribution to the development of the technical engineering profession. Additionally, selected engineering master's programs, including the Master of Science in Informatics Engineering, hold international accreditation by the Engineering Accreditation Commission of ABET (Accreditation Board for Engineering and Technology), a major United States-based accrediting organisation for university-level engineering programs.

In business and accounting sciences, undergraduate and master's programmes at the Faculty of Business Sciences (FCEP) maintain institutional cooperation and professional recognition frameworks with the Portuguese Association of Certified Accountants (Ordem dos Contabilistas Certificados — OCC), facilitating direct professional integration and exemptions for graduates. Professional degree programs across other faculties hold formal accreditation and professional body recognition. Programs offered at the School of Health, including Nursing and Health Technologies, are accredited by the Portuguese Order of Nurses (Ordem dos Enfermeiros) and the Order of Pharmacists (Ordem dos Farmacêuticos), granting automatic professional registration upon graduation. In law and administration, the Bachelor of Laws in Solicitorship at FCEP is recognized by the Association of Solicitors and Enforcement Agents (Ordem dos Solicitadores e dos Agentes de Execução — OSAE), fulfilling the academic prerequisites for entry into the regulated legal profession.

== Research ==
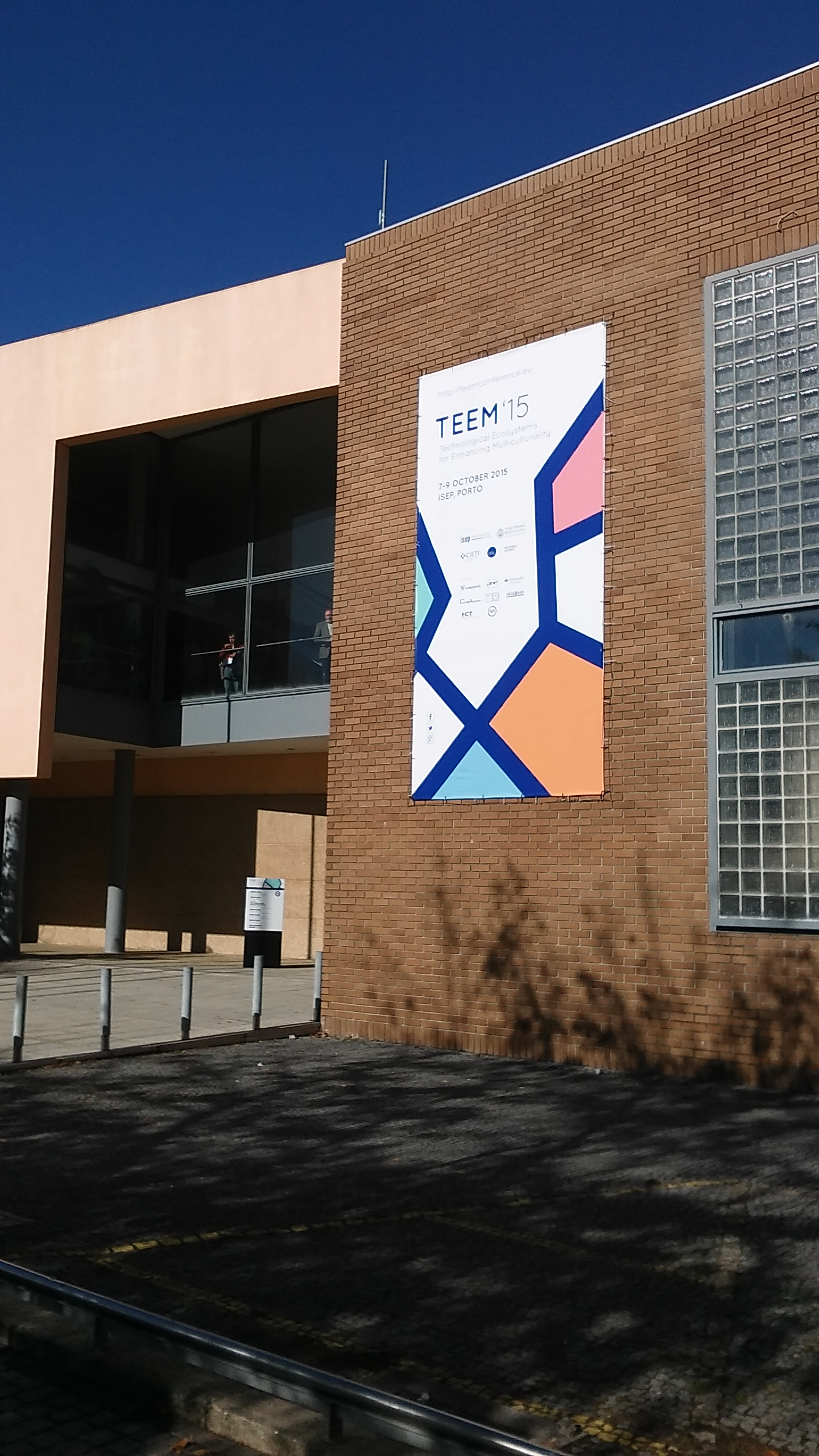
ISEP, UT Porto's engineering and R&D hub on Campus 1.

Research at UTP spans engineering, computing, autonomous systems, energy, health, environmental technologies, business, and creative media. Much of its research connects computing and engineering with practical applications, including industrial automation, autonomous vehicles, intelligent energy systems, and real-time data processing.

=== Robotics and artificial intelligence ===
Autonomous systems developed by UTP-affiliated researchers range from industrial drones to robotic platforms for maritime monitoring. A prominent example is an autonomous aerial vehicle developed by researchers at the Porto Institute of Engineering (ISEP) and INESC TEC for Volkswagen Autoeuropa. Faced with the challenge of automating warehouse inventory, the team found that commercially available drones did not meet the operational requirements and developed its own hardware and software solution. The vehicle combines autonomous indoor navigation, perception, localisation and trajectory planning with computer vision and artificial intelligence. It can read labels and barcodes, identify stored materials and cross-check inventory against warehouse-management data, bringing autonomous flight directly into the logistics workflow of an industrial plant. The system was developed under DRIVOLUTION, a collaborative research and industrial innovation agenda aimed at the “Factory of the Future”, involving companies and research institutions across Portugal, and was tested at Autoeuropa's facilities in Palmela.

The same broader field of autonomous systems extends to robotics for maritime environments. The Autonomous Systems Laboratory (LSA), associated with ISEP and INESC TEC, develops robotic platforms including ROAZ, an autonomous surface vehicle, and FALCOS, aerial systems for maritime monitoring. These platforms apply autonomous navigation and sensing to environments where remote observation and operation can be difficult or costly.

Artificial intelligence and autonomous decision-making also underpin research in energy and embedded computing. GECAD investigates intelligent energy systems, including smart grids, distributed energy resources, electricity markets and demand response. CISTER focuses on real-time and embedded computing, cyber-physical systems and wireless sensor networks, where software must operate reliably under strict timing and resource constraints. Research at SoftCPS extends these capabilities to edge computing and real-time AI, including data-processing frameworks for applications such as electric-vehicle charging and household energy management.

=== Engineering and applied research ===
ISEP's wider research activity covers mechanical and chemical engineering, biotechnology, materials science, automotive engineering, water and environmental technologies, and construction. Its research groups and laboratories include BIOMARK, which investigates biomimetic (bio)nanomaterials and sensor technologies for medical and industrial applications; GRAQ-REQUIMTE, which focuses on analytical chemistry, food safety, and environmental monitoring; and the Laboratory of Mathematical Engineering (LEMA), which applies mathematical modelling and numerical methods to engineering problems. Other facilities include CIDEM, CIETI, the Centre for Water Studies, the Automotive Laboratory, and the Laboratory of Geotechnics and Construction Materials.

Research at UTP's other academic units extends to business, health, education, and creative technologies. The Center for Organizational and Social Studies (CEOS.PP), associated with FCEP, conducts applied research in organizational studies, business analytics, governance, and information systems. The School of Health (ESS) undertakes research related to clinical diagnostics, health sciences, and rehabilitation. Research in music includes work by CESEM and CIPEM, the latter forming part of the Institute of Ethnomusicology – Centre for Studies in Music and Dance (INET-md). These groups contribute to research in music studies, music psychology, and music education. At the Faculty of Media Arts and Design (FMAD), research in creative technologies and digital media includes work associated with uniMAD and FAP, including interaction design and performance technology.

At Campus 3 in Felgueiras, the Center for Innovation and Research in Business and Industrial Sciences (CIICESI) connects research with the manufacturing sector of the Tâmega e Sousa region. Its areas of work include Industry 4.0, supply-chain optimization, and software engineering.

=== Research output and innovation ===
UTP's research ecosystem comprises 21 research and development units, five Associated Laboratories, three Collaborative Laboratories (CoLabs), and three Digital Innovation Hubs. It also extends beyond the university through participation in research institutes as a founding or associate member, alongside other academic, scientific and industry partners. These include INESC TEC, the i3S health research association and INEGI.

In 2024, UTP's scientific output included more than 1,000 publications indexed in the Web of Science and 1,200 in Scopus. Of its reported output, 31.9% appeared in first-quartile (Q1) journals and 54% was published open access. The institution also supports knowledge transfer and the development of spin-offs, connecting academic research with potential commercial and industrial applications.

At the regional level, UTP is involved in the Porto Innovation and Technology Community Hub (PITCH), an initiative originally launched by the Porto City Council in cooperation with the University of Porto and the Technical University of Porto. In September 2026, the project evolved towards a metropolitan framework, with the Porto Metropolitan Area taking a central role in plans to connect universities, research organisations, businesses and municipalities through a distributed network of innovation and technology facilities. The project remains under development.

== Governance ==
Institutional leadership
Leadership	Tenure
Presidents of the Polytechnic Institute of Porto (IPP)
Luís Soares	1985–2006
Vitor Santos	2006–2010
Rosário Gambôa	2010–2018
João Rocha	2018–2022
Paulo Pereira	2022–2026
Rectors of the Technical University of Porto (UTP)
Paulo Pereira	2026–present

The Technical University of Porto operates under a decentralized governance model that combines university and polytechnic education within a single public institution. Its nine constituent units, five university faculties and four polytechnic schools, retain substantial responsibility for their academic and operational affairs, while university-wide matters are coordinated by the central administration.

The Rector is the university's chief executive and legal representative and is assisted by the Vice-Rectors and the Rectorate (Reitoria). University-wide strategic and governance decisions are overseen by the General Council (Conselho Geral), which includes elected representatives of teaching and research staff and students, as well as external members. Financial and administrative management is the responsibility of the Management Board (Conselho de Gestão).

The decentralized structure gives the constituent faculties and schools a significant role in academic decision-making. Each unit has its own Director, Scientific Council and Pedagogical Council, dealing respectively with institutional leadership, scientific and academic matters, and teaching and pedagogical affairs. This creates a two-level governance structure: the central university administration provides institution-wide coordination, while the constituent units retain responsibility for much of their day-to-day academic activity.

The university was established in 2026 through the transformation of the Polytechnic Institute of Porto into the Technical University of Porto. During the transition, an Installative Commission (Comissão Instaladora) was established to oversee the implementation of the new institutional structure. The use of an installation regime prompted criticism from some teaching staff, who argued that the regime was designed primarily for newly established institutions, whereas the UTP succeeded an existing institution, the Polytechnic Institute of Porto, and its constituent schools were not newly created.

Academic quality is monitored through the university's Internal Quality Assurance System within Portugal's national higher-education accreditation framework, overseen by the Agency for Assessment and Accreditation of Higher Education (A3ES). Student welfare and support services, including scholarships, accommodation and campus dining, are provided through the Social Services (Serviços de Ação Social — SAS).

== Student Life ==
The Technical University of Porto has approximately 22,000 students enrolled across its schools. Student representation and campus culture across the university are organized by individual Student Unions (Associações de Estudantes — AEs) across its schools, coordinated under the broader umbrella of the Academic Federation of Porto (Federação Académica do Porto — FAP). Beyond policy representation and academic advocacy, these student unions actively drive campus life by organizing traditional academic festivities, sports tournaments, and cultural events.

The university's hands-on engineering and design philosophy is reflected in its student-led technical competition teams and extracurricular innovation groups. Notably, student teams from the Institute of Engineering (ISEP) regularly participate in international engineering challenges, such as Formula Student, where multidisciplinary teams design, build, and race prototype combustion and electric race cars. Similarly, student robotics clubs and software development groups compete in global competitions like RoboCup and IEEE autonomous vehicle challenges, leveraging the university's FabLabs and prototyping facilities to bridge academic instruction with competitive international engineering projects.

=== Academic Traditions ===
Academic tunas of UT Porto	School	Foundation
Tuna Académica do ISEP	ISEP	1990
Tuna Feminina do ISEP	ISEP	1991
Grupo de Fados do ISEP	ISEP	1990
Tuna de Contabilidade do Porto	FCEP	1992
Tuna Feminina do ISCAP	FCEP	1993
ESEPus Tunae	ESE	1993
Tuna Feminina da ESE	ESE	1997
Grupo Misto da ESE	ESE	2004
Tuna de Tecnologia da Saúde do Porto	E2S	1995
Tuna Feminina da ESS	E2S	1996
Grupo de Fados da ESS	E2S	2017
Gatunos Tuna Academica	Campus 2	1994
Tuna Academica Feminina do Campus 2	Campus 2	1996
Tuna Académica da ESTG	ESTG	2000
Tuna Feminina da ESTG	ESTG	2010

Students actively participate in Porto's historic academic customs, sharing traditions with the broader student community of the city and region. Academic life follows an annual cycle of initiation, student celebrations, musical traditions, and graduation-related ceremonies, with many activities organized at the level of individual faculties and schools. Central to freshman integration is the Praxe Académica, a system of peer-led initiation rites and codes of conduct governed by student-run decrees (Código de Praxe). Key milestones include the autumn Freshman Reception (Receção ao Caloiro), including traditional freshman activities, and the annual Queima das Fitas (Burning of the Ribbons) held every May, when students from institutions across Porto participate in parades, concerts, ceremonies, and other academic celebrations.

The Traje Académico (Academic dress) is an important part of student identity and ceremonial life in the academic community of Porto. Its use is closely associated with the city's academic traditions and major student celebrations, including the Queima das Fitas, and is represented in events organized by the Academic Federation of Porto. The academic dress also forms part of the traditions observed at inter-tuna festivals organized within Porto's academic community.

Campus cultural life is also strongly anchored by Tunas Académicas — traditional student musical ensembles. UTP's constituent schools host numerous male, female, and mixed groups, while ISEP and E2S also have student fado groups. Student fado forms part of a distinct academic musical tradition, with performances and practices associated with university life and the wider cultural heritage of Porto. The university has 15 recognized academic ensembles in total. These groups perform at academic ceremonies, festivals, integration events, and inter-tuna gatherings, forming an important part of student social and cultural life.

=== Sports ===
The university competes in national higher education championships (CNU – Campeonatos Nacionais Universitários) organized by FADU (Federação Académica do Desporto Universitário), with students participating in team and individual sports including volleyball, basketball, futsal, handball, athletics, swimming, martial arts, tennis, badminton, canoeing, climbing, rowing, surfing, table tennis, football, and beach volleyball, among others.

Student-athletes and recreational participants have access to university sports facilities. The main sports complex is located at Campus 1 (Porto / Asprela) and includes a multi-purpose sports hall homologated for official competitions, with seating for 400 spectators; synthetic outdoor courts; three sand courts for beach volleyball and beach tennis; a fitness facility offering cardio and strength training; a tennis school established in partnership with the Portuguese Tennis Federation; and a multi-activity climbing structure suitable for climbing, abseiling and zip-lining. A 2.5-kilometre maintenance circuit provides a dedicated route for running and jogging.

In 2023, the institution recorded 154 student-athletes and 68 medals in university competition. It has also achieved collective titles in several sports. In 2023, it won the team title at the Portuguese University Indoor Athletics Championships, ending the University of Porto's thirteen-season winning streak in the competition. In 2022, it also won the collective title at the Portuguese University Karate Championships, alongside individual titles for its athletes.

Students from different academic fields have also represented the university in international competition. These achievements include participation in Portugal's gold-medal-winning team at the 2022 FISU World University Championship in futsal and medal-winning performances in taekwondo and karate at the 2026 European University Combat Sports Championships.

Student associations also compete in university sports and esports. In 2025, the ISEP student association won the Portuguese University Championship in Rocket League, while the FMAD student association achieved podium finishes in Rocket League, Valorant and League of Legends at the Academic Esports Championships of Porto.

The university also hosts and supports university championship events. In 2023, it was responsible for the local organization of the Portuguese University Swimming Championships at the Campanhã Swimming Complex in Porto.

=== Cultural facilities ===
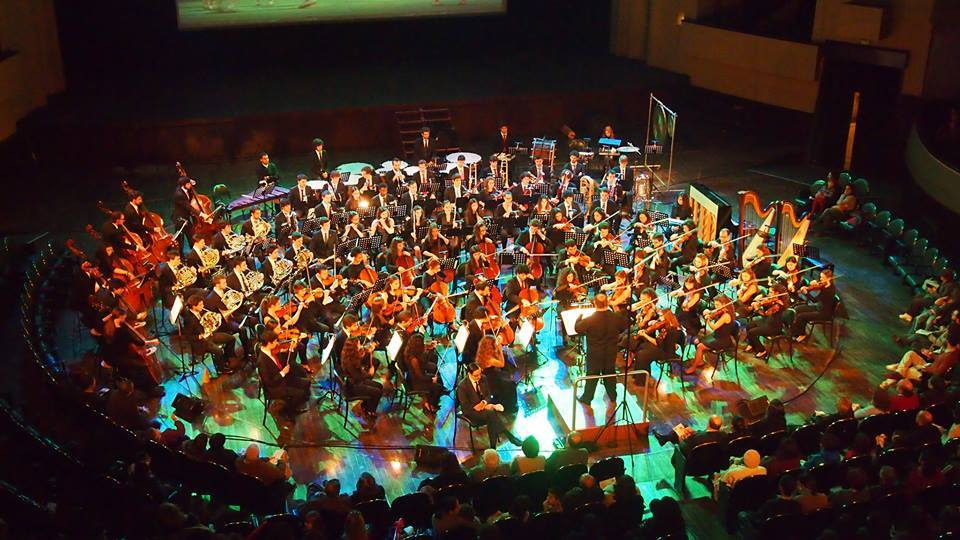
The ESMAE Symphony Orchestra.

UTP's cultural facilities and activities are centred on its Faculty of Performing Arts (ESMAE), which combines programmes in music, theatre and related performing arts with public performances, resident ensembles and creative spaces.

The Helena Sá e Costa Theatre (Teatro Helena Sá e Costa), located at ESMAE in Porto's historic centre, hosts student productions, opera workshops, dance performances and other public events. The faculty also maintains classical and contemporary ensembles, including the ESMAE Symphony Orchestra (Orquestra Sinfónica ESMAE), Symphonic Band (Banda Sinfónica), Big Band and chamber music groups, which perform both within the school and at venues such as Casa da Música.

Other spaces, including the Café-Concerto Francisco Beja and performance laboratories, support experimental theatre, sound production, film screenings and interdisciplinary artistic creation.

=== International Community ===
UTP’s international community comprises both degree-seeking international students and short-term mobility exchange participants. Under the International Student Statute, the university admits full-degree international students through special competition access pathways. This includes recognition of foreign secondary education qualifications, such as Brazil's Exame Nacional do Ensino Médio (ENEM), as well as dedicated entry channels for students from the Community of Portuguese Language Countries (CPLP). Consequently, students from the CPLP account for 86% of the degree-seeking international body, with particularly strong representation from Brazil and Portuguese-speaking African countries (PALOP).

In addition to degree-seeking enrolments, UTP hosts over 1,200 mobility exchange students annually through the Erasmus+ programme and bilateral academic partnerships across Latin America and Asia. International integration and student welfare are supported by local integration networks and student association services. European mobility is further reinforced through the institution's membership in the ATHENA European University Alliance, an initiative supported by the European Commission that promotes joint educational programmes, shared research infrastructure, and mobility across its ten member universities of Orléans, Siegen, Crete, Maribor, Vilnius Tech, Vigo, Salento, Lublin, and Kyiv Polytechnic.

== Notable alumni and faculty ==
The university has educated figures who made significant contributions to Portuguese engineering, industry, science, education and the arts. Among ISEP's former students was António Carvalho da Silva Porto, a Portuguese painter and one of the leading figures of Naturalism in Portugal who enrolled in industrial drawing in 1865. José Ferreira de Albuquerque e Castro, who studied at the institute before losing his sight in an accident during laboratory experiments, became an important figure in the education of blind people in Portugal and in the dissemination of Braille, founding a Braille press in Porto in 1956. Cândida Lencart, who graduated in chemical engineering in 1941, was among the relatively few women pursuing engineering at the time and went on to work as a chemical engineer in Switzerland. Ana Pires, who graduated in Geotechnical and Geoenvironmental Engineering, became a researcher in geotechnologies, geotechnical engineering and robotics at INESC TEC. In 2018, she was one of 12 people selected from hundreds of candidates for the PoSSUM Scientist-Astronaut Qualification Program, supported by NASA, becoming the first Portuguese woman to complete the program. She subsequently participated in an analogue Mars mission in Utah, conducting geotechnical and geotechnological fieldwork and testing technologies for planetary exploration. José Manuel dos Santos Fernandes, who studied electrotechnics and machinery, later became a co-founder of the Frezite industrial group, established in 1978 and subsequently expanded internationally.

The Faculty of Media Arts and Design has also produced internationally recognised artists, notably João Gonzalez, whose animated short Ice Merchants won the Annie Award for Best Short Film and the Best Short Film award in Competition at Cannes' Critics' Week in 2022, and became the first Portuguese film nominated for the Academy Award for Best Animated Short Film at the Oscars in 2023. Gonzalez completed his degree in Multimedia at the faculty; while studying there he made the animated films Nestor and The Voyager, which also received awards and festival selections internationally. Alumni of the Faculty of Performing Arts include Maria Mendes, a Portuguese singer, composer and arranger, is known for blending jazz with fado. She received Grammy nominations in 2021 and 2024 and Latin Grammy nominations in 2020 and 2023. She won the Edison Award for Best Jazz Vocal Album in 2020 for Close to Me. Ana Vieira Leite is a soprano specialising in early music and Baroque opera. She won first prize at the International Baroque Singing Competition of Froville in 2020 and has performed at major European opera houses, including the Opéra national de Paris, Teatro Real in Madrid and the Gran Teatre del Liceu in Barcelona. Other alumni include jazz vibraphonist and composer Eduardo Cardinho, and composer, conductor and pianist Carlos Lopes.

Among FCEP's alumni, Carlos da Silva Costa became an economist and was appointed Governor of the Bank of Portugal in 2010, after serving as Vice-President of the European Investment Bank and holding other senior positions in European financial institutions. Luís Miguel Ribeiro became President of the Associação Empresarial de Portugal (AEP) in 2019 and, as of 2026, also serves as President of the AEP Foundation and of Exponor, one of Portugal's major exhibition and convention centres.

Notable faculty at ISEP have included engineers, educators and artists. José Vitorino Damásio was one of the early figures in industrial education in Porto and was associated with the origins of the institute. An engineer, industrialist and teacher, he helped establish the Industrial School of Porto and was involved in the construction of Portugal's first dredger, the machinery of Porto's pioneering mechanical rope-making factory, and the city's first steam engine. He also founded the Fábrica de Fundição do Bolhão and introduced practical industrial training through workshops. Gustavo Adolfo Gonçalves e Sousa was an engineer, professor and director of the institute. As chief engineer of the Porto Public Works Board, he was involved in major works in the city, including the Palácio da Bolsa, the Palácio de Cristal and the development of Boavista, and planned and directed a railway project between Porto and Leça da Palmeira. Manoel da Terra Pereira Viana was an engineer, professor and public works official who taught civil construction. He worked on the inspection of bridges and metal structures, served on the administrative board of the Benguela Railway, and chaired the commission responsible for revising Portugal's reinforced-concrete regulations in 1932. Pedro Burmester, a concert pianist and music educator, has taught at the Faculty of Performing Arts since 2010 and received the Medal of Honour of the City of Porto in 2025.

Ana Pires, alumna of ISEP and researcher in geotechnologies and planetary exploration.

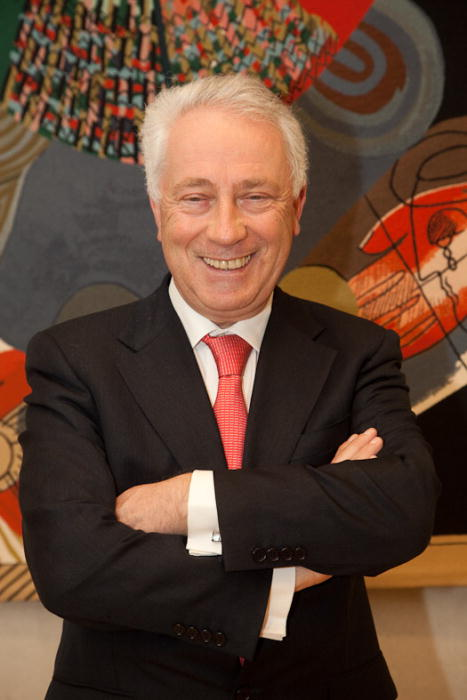
Carlos da Silva Costa, Governor of the Bank of Portugal from 2010 to 2020. He participated in a alumni event in 2025.

Pedro Burmester, concert pianist and music educator, has taught at the Faculty of Performing Arts since 2010.

== See also ==
- List of colleges and universities in Portugal
- Erasmus Programme
