= Froville =

- Commune
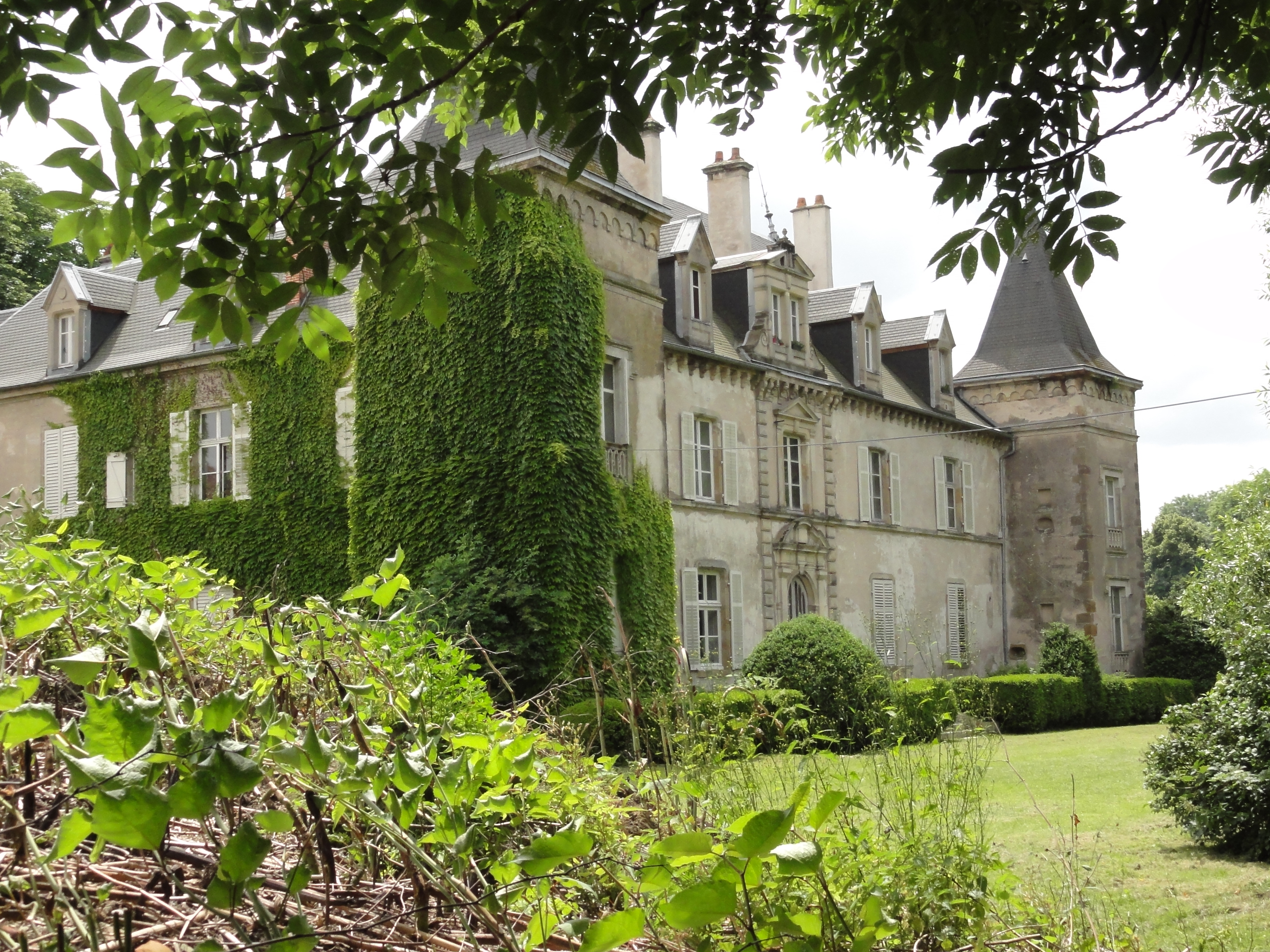
- The chateau in Froville

- Coat of arms
- Location of Froville
- Location within France Location within Grand Est
- Coordinates: 48°28′14″N 6°21′17″E
- Country: France
- Region: Grand Est
- Department: Meurthe-et-Moselle
- Arrondissement: Lunéville
- Canton: Lunéville-2

Government
  - Mayor (2021–2026): Patrick Morand
- Area^{1}: 5.89 km^{2} (2.27 sq mi)
- Elevation: 265 m (869 ft)
- Highest elevation: 307 m (1,007 ft)
- Lowest elevation: 249 m (817 ft)
- Population (2023): 119
  - Density: 20.2/km^{2} (52.3/sq mi)
- Time zone: UTC+01:00 (CET)
  - Summer (DST): UTC+02:00 (CEST)
- INSEE/Postal code: 54216 /54290
- ^{1} French Land Register data, which excludes lakes, ponds, glaciers > 1 km^{2} (0.386 sq mi or 247 acres) and river estuaries.

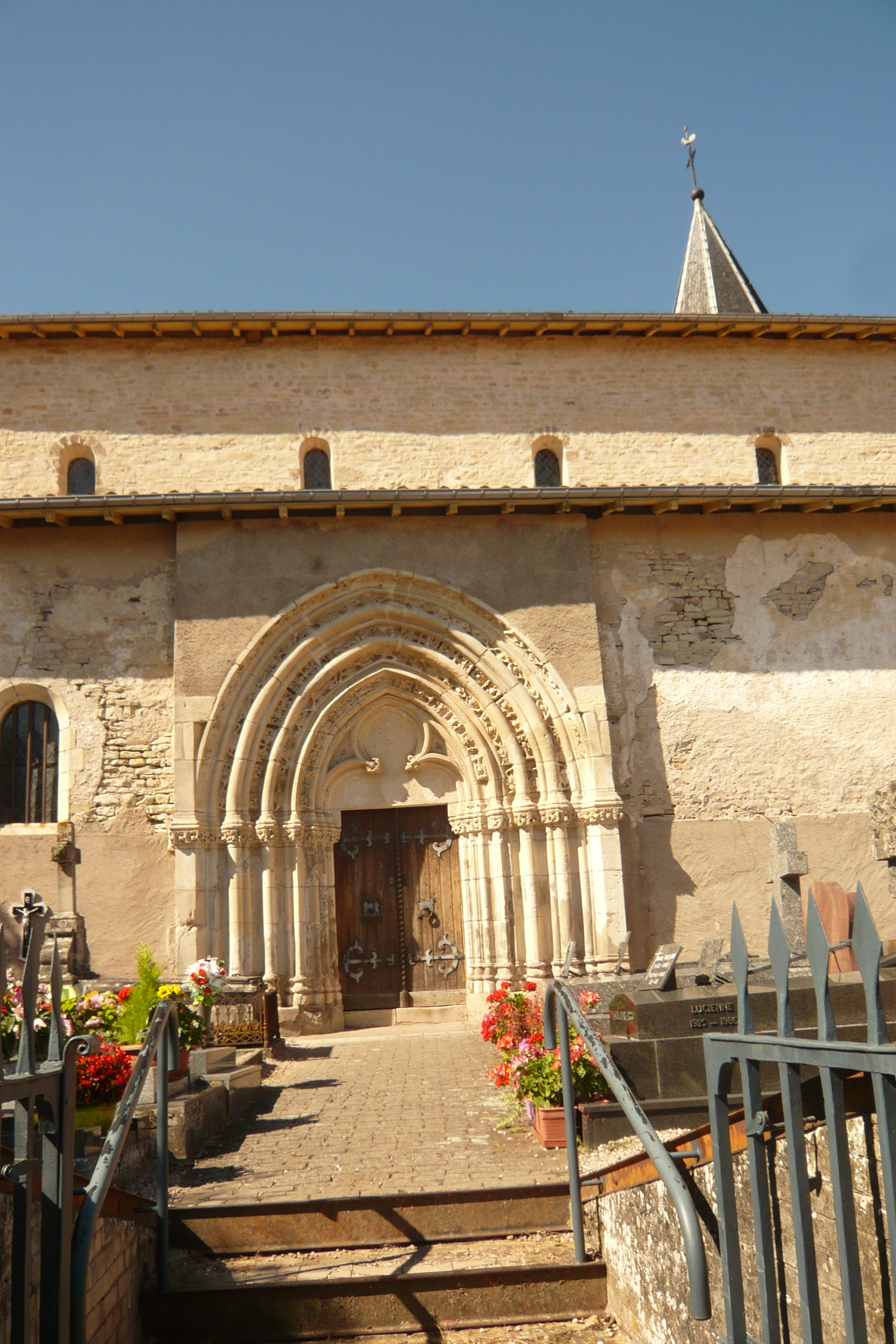
Gothic door of Romanesque priory church in Froville

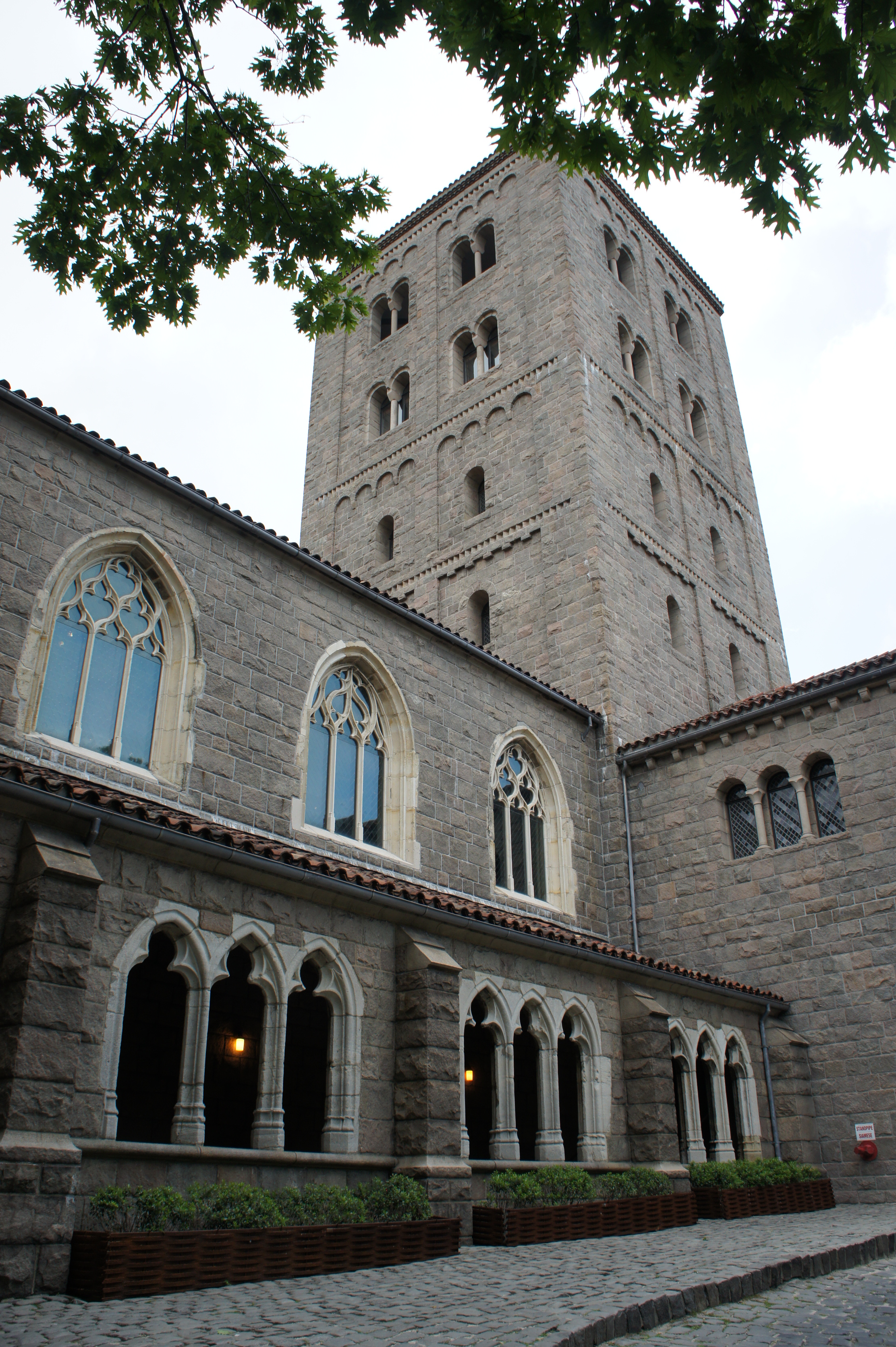
the Froville Arcade at the Cloisters Museum, NYC

Froville (French pronunciation: [fʁɔvil]) is a commune in the Meurthe-et-Moselle department in north-eastern France.

It is noted for its romanesque church, with a gothic cloister, part of which was moved to the Cloisters Museum of New York City.

Froville hosts a festival of sacred and baroque music.

== See also ==
- Communes of the Meurthe-et-Moselle department
