= Baião =

Baião may refer to:

- Baião (music)
- Baião, Portugal, a municipality in northern Portugal
- Baião, Pará, Brazil
- Baião de dois, Brazilian dish made of rice and beans.
