= Escola Superior de Estudos Industriais e de Gestão =

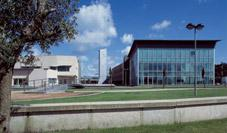
Polytechnic University of Porto's School of Management and Industrial Studies.

The Escola Superior de Estudos Industriais e de Gestão (ESEIG, English: School of Management and Industrial Studies) was a Portuguese public polytechnic higher education institution located on the border between the municipalities of Póvoa de Varzim and Vila do Conde in Northern Portugal. Founded as a constituent school of the Polytechnic University of Porto (Instituto Politécnico do Porto or P.PORTO), ESEIG operated until 2016, when a structural reorganization dissolved the school and divided its operations into two newly created specialized institutions housed on the expanded site, now known as Campus 2 of the Technical University of Porto.

== History ==
ESEIG was established in 1990 to address regional demand for higher vocational and technical education in the industrial and service-heavy coastal region north of Porto. In its early years, the school operated out of separate facilities in both Póvoa de Varzim and Vila do Conde.

To consolidate operations, Porto Polytechnic constructed a unified campus on the municipal border between Póvoa de Varzim and Vila do Conde. Although the vast majority of the physical campus grounds and facilities are situated in Póvoa de Varzim, the institution historically utilized an administrative mailing address associated with Vila do Conde.

Prior to its restructuring, ESEIG offered undergraduate (licenciatura) and master's degrees in a broad spectrum of disciplines:

Web Technologies and Information Systems

Science and Technology of Documentation and Information

Accounting and Administration

Design

Biomedical Engineering

Industrial Engineering and Management

Mechanical Engineering

Hotel Management and Administration

Human Resources Management

== Restructuring and Creation of Campus 2 (2016) ==
In 2016, the Polytechnic University of Porto reorganized its academic presence in the Póvoa de Varzim and Vila do Conde region via Decreto-Lei n.º 63/2016. The goal was to transition from ESEIG's broad multi-disciplinary structure into two domain-specific schools aligned with regional economic sectors: media, arts, design, tourism, and hospitality.

Under this legislative decree, ESEIG officially ceased operations, and its facilities were designated as P.PORTO Campus 2. Its academic programs, faculty, and assets were split into two newly founded schools on the same campus:

ESMAD (School of Media Arts and Design, Escola Superior de Media Artes e Design): Focused on digital media, web development, photography, cinema, graphic design, and interactive media. Currently transformed into the Faculty of Media Arts and Design.

ESHT (School of Hospitality and Tourism, Escola Superior de Hotelaria e Turismo): Focused on hospitality management, catering, tourism, and culinary arts.

Engineering and business administration programs previously hosted by ESEIG were reorganized into the new schools or integrated into other established P.PORTO faculties, such as the Instituto Superior de Engenharia do Porto (ISEP) and the Instituto Superior de Contabilidade e Administração do Porto (ISCAP).

== Facilities ==
Campus 2 features specialized laboratories, design studios, multimedia production units, industrial kitchen facilities, and an auditorium, serving thousands of students across undergraduate, postgraduate, and professional technical courses (CTeSP).
