= Santa Clara Aqueduct =

Aqueduct of Santa Clara
- Aqueducto de Santa Clara
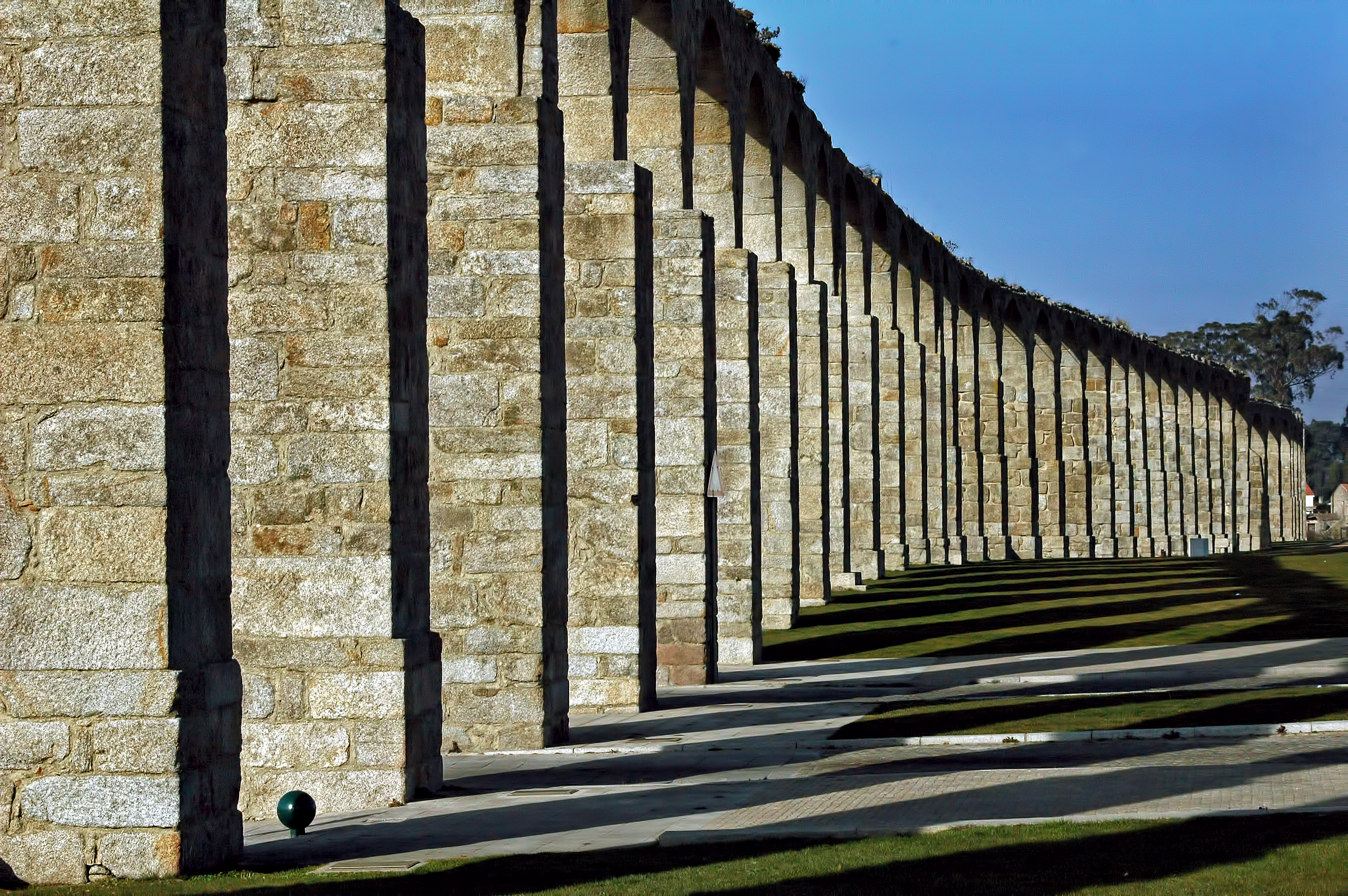
- Vertical pillars of the aqueduct near the Church of Santa Clara
- Interactive map of the Aqueduct of Santa Clara area

General information
- Type: Aqueduct
- Architectural style: Medieval
- Location: Vila do Conde, Vila do Conde, Portugal
- Coordinates: 41°21′22.7″N 8°44′23.8″W
- Construction started: 1626
- Completed: 1714
- Owner: Portuguese Republic

Technical details
- Material: Granite

Design and construction
- Architect: Manuel Pinho Villa Lobos

Portuguese National Monument
- Type: Non-movable
- Criteria: National Monument
- Designated: 16-06-1910
- Reference no.: PT011316280006

References
- http://www.monumentos.gov.pt/Site/APP_PagesUser/SIPA.aspx?id=3904

The Aqueduct of Santa Clara is the second largest Portuguese aqueduct system. Built between 1626 and 1714, it includes 999 arches stretching for 4 kilometres (2.5 mi) from the spring of Terroso in the municipality of Póvoa de Varzim to the Convent of Santa Clara in the municipality of Vila do Conde.

== History ==
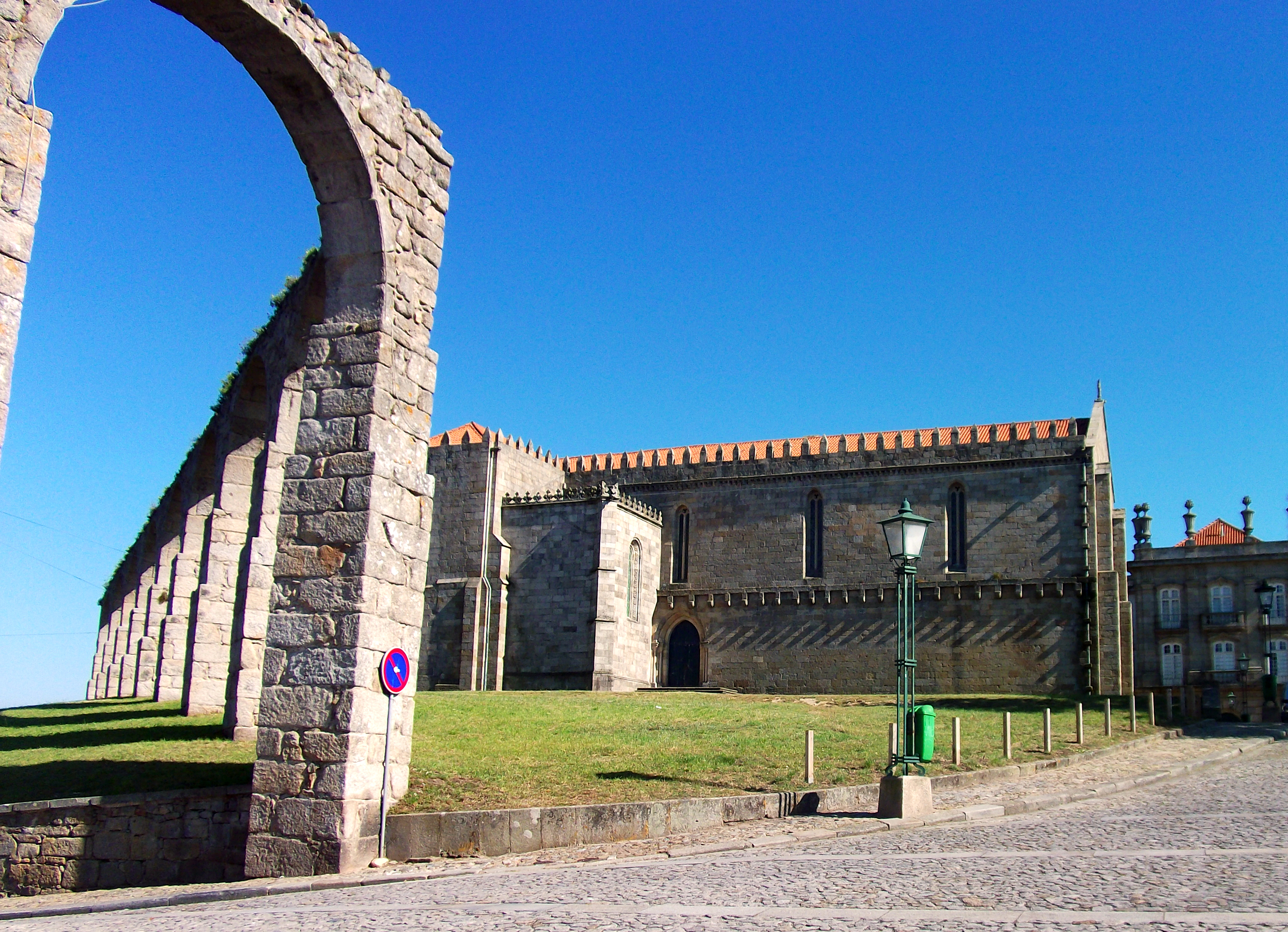
Segment of the aqueduct as it meets the convent

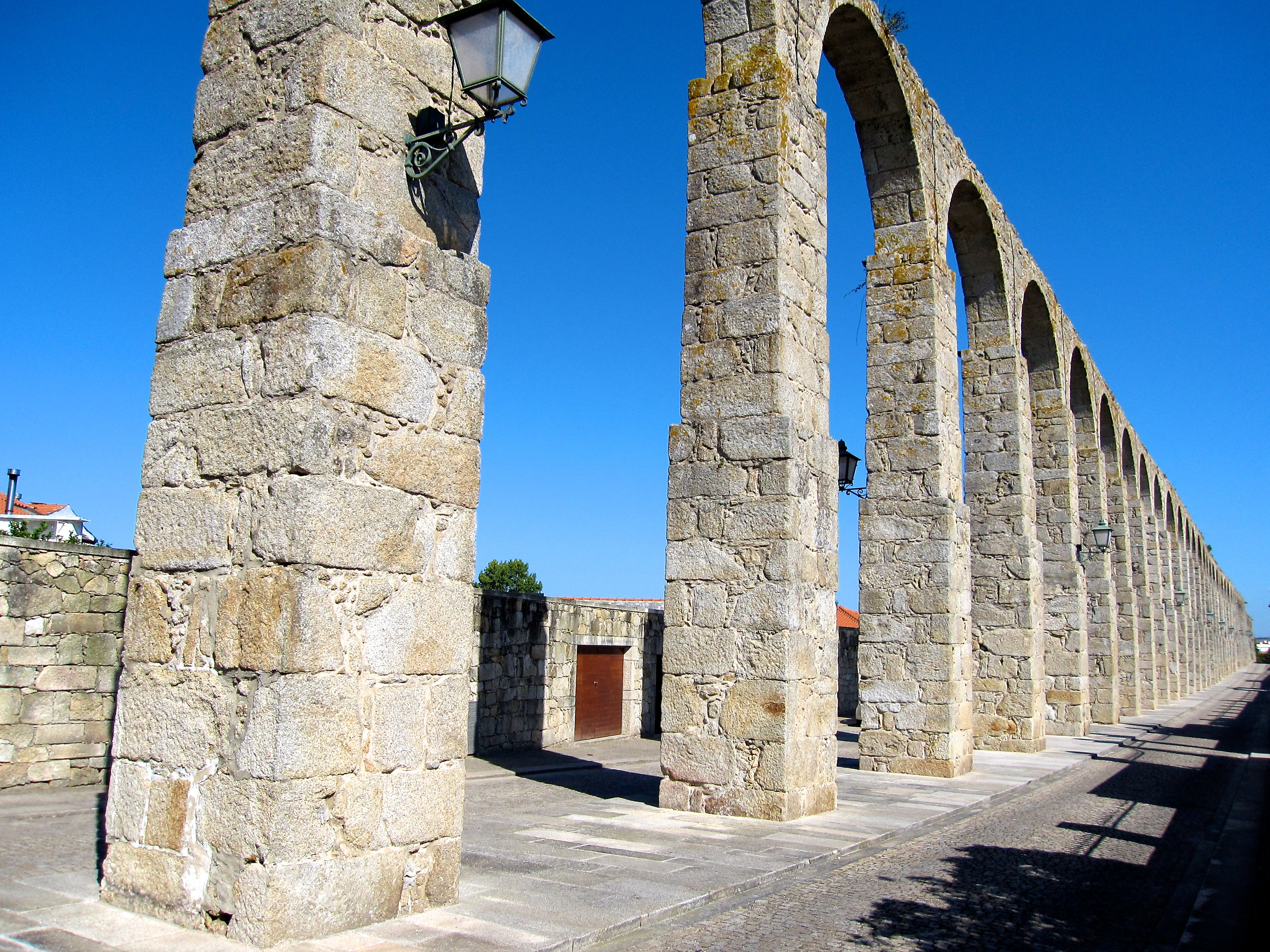
Part of the pillars of the 999 arches

Founded at the beginning of the 14th century, the monastic community of Santa Clara was always confronted with serious problems concerning the water supply to the monastery in the territory of Vila do Conde. At that time a tank (the arca de água) was constructed within the monastery, which quickly became insufficient to meet the communities' needs. In 1626, the abbess D. Maria de Meneses, from the House of Pentieiros, purchased lands and contracted a master-builder to construct an aqueduct to bring waters from a spring in Terroso, in Póvoa de Varzim, to support the convent. The construction was interrupted by abbess D. Catarina Lima in 1636, owing to the discovery of a significant slope, making the prior work useless.

On 19 December 1705, the project was restarted, under abbess D. Bárbara Micaela de Ataíde, from the House of Honra de Barbosa, in Penafiel. The abbess put the project under the direction of captain Domingos Lopes, from Porto and artillery lieutenant-general Manuel de Villa Lobos. Further support for the project was obtained by D. Bárbara de Ataíde, who along with sisters D. Maria Ângela and D. Maria Antónia) and her brother D. Manuel de Azevedo de Ataíde e Brito (Military Governor of the Province of Minho) petitioned the King to provide a private judge and exempt the workers from military service. Although the project was tendered to masterbuilder João Rodrigues (from Ponta de Lima), he failed to complete the project. It was then passed to Domingos Moreira (from Moreira da Maia), who was tasked to complete the project and paid 4400$00 réis.

The first waters reached the convent's cloister on 20 October 1714.

By 2 October 1739, the Congregation of Rites confirmed the excommunication of people caught stealing water from the aqueduct.

Somewhere around Casal do Monte, during a storm on 10 June 1794, 46 arches were knocked down.

Between 1929 and 1932, there was an intentional deconstruction of five arches, during the restoration of the Church of Santa Clara, in order to improve the view of the apse.

A tender was issued in January 2004, in order promote the conservation and consolidate the structure.

On 25 November 2006, the spaces surrounding the aqueduct were requalified (between the monastery of Santa Clara and Rua da Lada), authored by architect Manuel Maia Gomes, who received the Alexandre Herculano National Architecture Award by the Associação Portuguesa dos Municípios (APMCH), the Portuguese Municipal Association. Yet, although the structure was legally protected in 1910, several arches fell as recently as December 2009 and the destroyed arches were not recovered. This problem mostly affects the area of the monument located in Póvoa de Varzim, due to lack of maintenance, a responsibility of the national government.

== Architecture ==
The aqueduct is located in a rural environment, isolated and elevated position, annexed to existing structures; some parts of the aqueduct are connected to the Convent of Santa Clara and the Convent of Nossa Senhora da Encarnação.

The artificial canal extends from the convent to the spring, an extension formed by 999 arches. Of the original structure, a great part of the early aqueduct has been weakened over time, not including the segment from the Church of Santa Clara until the municipal limits, an extension of 500 metres (1,600 ft) of 4 kilometres (2.5 mi). The aqueduct has a decreasing arcade span and height, with pointed arches and a rounded upper channel profile.
