= École polytechnique (disambiguation) =

The École polytechnique is a French grande école founded in 1794 to train students in sciences and technology.

École polytechnique may also refer to the following schools:

== Algeria ==
- National Polytechnic School (Algeria), or École Nationale Polytechnique (ENP), an engineering school in Algiers

== Canada ==
- Polytechnique Montréal (formerly École polytechnique de Montréal), an engineering school affiliated with the Université de Montréal

== France ==
- Polytech Nantes (also known as École polytechnique universitaire de Nantes Université)
- Polytech Orléans (also known as École polytechnique universitaire d'Orléans)
- Polytech Nancy (also known as École polytechnique universitaire de Lorraine)
- EPF Engineering School (also known as École polytechnique féminine)

== Switzerland ==
- École Polytechnique Fédérale de Lausanne (EPFL), a Swiss research university

== See also ==
- École polytechnique massacre, a 1989 mass shooting targeting female students of École Polytechnique de Montréal
- L'Ecole Polytechnique Monument, a monument at the United States Military Academy, donated by students from the École Polytechnique
- Polytechnic (disambiguation)
