= Eurecom =

Graduate school and research center in France

EURECOM
- Type: Graduate school and research centre
- Established: 1991
- Founders: Télécom Paris and EPFL
- Affiliations: Institut Mines-Télécom
- Director: David Gesbert
- Location: Sophia Antipolis, Alpes-Maritimes, France; 43°37′36″N 7°02′47″E
- Campus: https://my.web-visite.com/F1rEAPJTEz/12782276p,2944817m,156.56h,90.00t
- Website: https://www.eurecom.fr/en/

EURECOM is a French Graduate school (Grande École) and a research center in digital sciences. It is part of the Institut Mines-Télécom and it is a founding member of the SophiaTech Campus in Sophia Antipolis, the largest Science and Technology Information campus in the Alpes-Maritimes. It was created in 1991 as a Groupement d'intérêt économique with French and foreign academic and industrial members. The Institut Mines-Télécom is a founding member of EURECOM consortium. Current members of the consortium are listed below:

- industrial members: Orange, BMW Group Research & Technology, Symantec, SAP, IABG;
- institutional members: Principality of Monaco;
- academic members: Institut Mines-Télécom, Aalto University (Helsinki), Politecnico di Torino, Technical University of Munich (TUM), Norwegian University of Science and Technology (NTNU), Chalmers University of Technology, Czech Technical University in Prague (CTU), TU Wien, ITMO University.

EURECOM is a member of the Secured Communication Solutions (SCS) competitiveness cluster.

Teaching and research activities of EURECOM are organized around three fields: Digital Security, Communication Systems and Data Science.

== Teaching ==
EURECOM provides graduate and post graduate courses including doctoral programs. All courses are taught in English and are accredited by the French State, Commission des Titres d'Ingénieur.

EURECOM awards 4 Master of Science Degrees, co-delivered by Institut Mines-Télécom and accredited by the French State:

- Master of Science in Data Science and Engineering;
- Master of Science in Digital Security;
- Master of Science in Mobile Computing Systems;
- Master of Science in Internet of Things.

In 2012, EURECOM was accredited by the CTI (French Accreditation Agency for Engineering Education) to deliver two post master's degrees (Diplôme d'ingénieur spécialisé), open to applicants with a completed master's degree, in:

- Communications for Intelligent Transport Systems - Connected Vehicles;
- Security for Computer Systems and Communications.

Both degrees were awarded the EURACE label, delivered by ENAEE (European Network for Accreditation of Engineering Education).

In 2020, EURECOM signed a double degree partnership agreement with EDHEC Business School (Ecole des Hautes Etudes Commerciales du Nord) on both Management (business) and Internet of Things (Engineering).

EURECOM is also a co-organising partner for BMW Group Summer School organised annually.

== Research ==
The research activity of EURECOM is organized around three principal themes:

- Communication Systems;
- Data Science;
- Digital Security.

EURECOM has currently 26 faculty members and around 70 PhD students. Its contractual research is recognized across Europe and contributes largely to its budget.

EURECOM's research was rewarded with three ERC grants in three years attributed to Prof. Davide Balzarotti, Prof. Petros Elia and Prof. David Gesbert.

Two Télécom Paris research labs are associated with EURECOM: System on Chip and ICT Usage.

== Rankings ==
2020

- 3rd among top 25 performers in "Co-publication with industrial partners" by U-Multirank.
- 3rd among top 25 performers in "Student Mobility" by U-Multirank.
- 2nd University for Computer Science and Electronics in France by Guide2Research.

2019

- 551/600 worldwide in Computer Science & Information Systems by QS World University Rankings.

2018

- 11th Higher Education Institution in France by Scimago Institutions Rankings.
- Five QS Stars in Teaching, Employability and Facilities.

== Memberships/Labels ==
EURECOM received the label of "Carnot Institute" since 2006. Moreover, it has a two-year double degree programme under Erasmus Mundus Master Label, and it is part of the two EIT Digital Masters in Autonomous System (AUS) and Cybersecurity (CSE).
