= List of institutions using the term "institute of technology" or "polytechnic" =

This is a list of institutions using the term institute of technology or polytechnic. "Institute of technology" is a designation employed for a wide range of learning institutions awarding different types of degrees and operating often at variable levels of the educational system. The English term "polytechnic" appeared in the early 19th century, from the French École Polytechnique, an engineering school founded in 1794 in Paris. The French term comes from the Greek πολύ (polú or polý, meaning "many") and τεχνικός (tekhnikós, meaning "arts"). While the terms "institute of technology" and "polytechnic" are synonymous, the preferred term varies from country to country.

== University level ==
There are many university level higher learning institutions granting the highest academic degrees (including doctorate), that use the terms "institute of technology" or "polytechnic" for historic reasons:

Australia

- Royal Melbourne Institute of Technology, Melbourne

Bahrain

- Bahrain Polytechnic, Isa Town

Brazil

- Escola Politécnica da Pontifícia Universidade Católica do Rio Grande do Sul, Porto Alegre
- Escola Politécnica de Pernambuco, Recife
- Escola Politécnica da Universidade de São Paulo, São Paulo
- Polytechnic School of Federal University of Rio de Janeiro, Rio de Janeiro

Canada

- École Polytechnique de Montréal
- Kwantlen Polytechnic University, Metro Vancouver, British Columbia

Chile

- Federico Santa María Technical University, Valparaíso

China

- Harbin Institute of Technology, Harbin, Heilongjiang

Czech Republic

- Czech Technical University, Prague

Denmark

- Technical University of Denmark, Copenhagen

Ecuador

- National Polytechnic School, Quito

Finland

- Kemi-Tornio University of Applied Sciences (KTUAS), Kemi-Tornio, Lapland

France

- École Polytechnique, Palaiseau
- École polytechnique de l'université de Nantes
- Ecole Polytechnique de l'Université d'Orléans
- Institut National Polytechnique de Grenoble
- ParisTech (Paris Institute of Technology), Paris
- Polytechnic Institute of Paris
- Polytech Group

Germany

- Technical University of Munich, Munich

Japan

- Tokyo Polytechnic University

Greece

- Polytechnic Universities of Greece (also known as Technical Universities)
- Technological Educational Institute (TEI) is also known as Institute of Technology

Hong Kong

- Hong Kong Polytechnic University

India

- Indian Institutes of Technology
- National Institutes of Technology

Indonesia

- Bandung Institute of Technology, Bandung
- Kalimantan Institute of Technology, Balikpapan
- Sepuluh Nopember Institute of Technology, Surabaya
- Sumatera Institute of Technology, Bandar Lampung

Iran

- Amirkabir University of Technology also known as Tehran Polytechnic, Tehran
- K.N.Toosi University of Technology, Tehran
- Sharif University of Technology , Tehran
- Isfahan University of Technology, Isfahan
- Babol Noshirvani University of Technology, Babol, Mazandaran
- Sahand University of Technology, Osku County, East Azarbaijan
- Malek Ashtar University of Technology, with campuses in Tehran and Shahin Shahr, Isfahan
- Shahrood University of Technology, Shahrood, Semnan
- Hamedan University of Technology, Hamedan
- Kermanshah University of Technology, Kermanshah
- Qom University of Technology, Qom
- Shiraz University of Technology, Fars, Shiraz
- Quchan University of Technology, Quchan, Razavi Khorasan
- University of Science and Technology of Mazandaran, Behshahr, Mazandaran
- Birjand University of Technology, Birjand, South Khorasan
- Urmia University of Technology, Urmia, West Azarbaijan
- Arak University of Technology, Arak, Markazi
- Sirjan University of Technology, Sirjan, Kerman

Ireland

- Dublin Institute of Technology, Dublin

Israel

- Technion - Israel Institute of Technology, Haifa

Italy

- Politecnico di Bari
- Politecnico di Milano
- Politecnico di Torino
- Università Politecnica delle Marche (Polytechnic University of the Marches), Ancona

Macau

- Instituto Politécnico de Macau

Mexico

- National Polytechnic Institute

Nigeria

- Eastern Polytechnic, Port Harcourt, Rivers State
- Yaba College of Technology (Yaba Tech), Lagos

Netherlands

- Delft University of Technology
- Eindhoven University of Technology
- University of Twente, Enschede
- Wageningen University & Research

Philippines

- Polytechnic University of the Philippines System

Poland

- Politechnika Białostocka, Białystok
- Politechnika Częstochowska, Częstochowa
- Politechnika Gdańska, Gdańsk
- Politechnika Koszalińska, Koszalin
- Politechnika Krakowska, Kraków
- Politechnika Łódzka, Łódź
- Politechnika Opolska, Opole
- Politechnika Poznańska, Poznań
- Politechnika Rzeszowska, Rzeszów
- Politechnika Śląska, Gliwice
- Politechnika Świętokrzyska, Kielce
- Politechnika Warszawska, Warsaw
- Politechnika Wrocławska, Wrocław

Puerto Rico

- Polytechnic University of Puerto Rico

Republic of the Congo

- Faculté polytechnique de l'université de Kinshasa, Kinshasa

Romania

- Gheorghe Asachi Technical University of Iași
- Politehnica University of Bucharest
- Polytechnic University of Timișoara
- Technical University of Cluj-Napoca

Russia

- Saint Petersburg Polytechnical University, Saint Petersburg

South Korea

- Korea Polytechnic University

Spain

- Universitat Politècnica de Catalunya
- Universidad Politécnica de Madrid
- Universitat Politècnica de València
- Universidad Politécnica de Cartagena

Sweden

- Blekinge Institute of Technology
- Royal Institute of Technology, Stockholm

Switzerland

- École Polytechnique Fédérale de Lausanne
- ETH Zurich

Thailand

- Asian Institute of Technology, Bangkok (Pathumthani)

Turkey

- Gebze Institute of Technology (GIT), Kocaeli
- İzmir Institute of Technology (İYTE), İzmir

United Arab Emirates

- Abu Dhabi Polytechnic, Abu Dhabi and Al Ain

United States

- California Institute of Technology (Caltech), Pasadena, California
- California Polytechnic State University (Cal Poly San Luis Obispo), San Luis Obispo, California
- California State Polytechnic University, Pomona (Cal Poly Pomona), Pomona, California
- California State Polytechnic University, Humboldt (Cal Poly Humboldt), Arcata, California
- Carnegie Institute of Technology, former name of Carnegie Mellon University, Pittsburgh, Pennsylvania
- DeVry Institute of Technology, former name of DeVry University, Phoenix, Arizona
- Florida Institute of Technology (Florida Tech), Melbourne, Florida
- Florida Polytechnic University, Lakeland, Florida
- Georgia Institute of Technology (Georgia Tech), Atlanta, Georgia
- Illinois Institute of Technology (IIT or Illinois Tech), Chicago, Illinois
- Indiana Institute of Technology (Indiana Tech), Fort Wayne, Indiana
- Kansas State University Polytechnic Campus, Salina, Kansas
- Massachusetts Institute of Technology (MIT), Cambridge, Massachusetts
- New Jersey Institute of Technology (NJIT), Newark, New Jersey
- New Mexico Institute of Mining and Technology (New Mexico Tech), Socorro, New Mexico
- New York Institute of Technology (NYIT), Old Westbury, New York
- Polytechnic Institute of New York University (Poly) (NYU-Poly), Brooklyn, New York
- Purdue Polytechnic Institute, West Lafayette, Indiana
- Rensselaer Polytechnic Institute (RPI), Troy, New York
- Rochester Institute of Technology (RIT), Rochester, New York
- Rose-Hulman Institute of Technology (RHIT), Terre Haute, Indiana
- State University of New York Institute of Technology (SUNYIT), Utica, New York
- Stevens Institute of Technology (Stevens Tech), Hoboken, New Jersey
- Southern Polytechnic State University, Marietta, Georgia
- Oregon Institute of Technology (OIT or Oregon Tech), Klamath Falls, Oregon
- University of Minnesota Institute of Technology, Minneapolis-St. Paul, Minnesota
- University of Wisconsin-Stout, Menomonie, Wisconsin
- Virginia Polytechnic Institute and State University (Virginia Tech), Blacksburg, Virginia
- West Virginia University Institute of Technology (WVU Tech or West Virginia Tech), Montgomery, West Virginia
- Worcester Polytechnic Institute (WPI), Worcester, Massachusetts

== Other higher education ==
There are many other types of higher education institutions (post-secondary education) which are not universities and use the terms "institute of technology" or "polytechnic":

Australia

- Melbourne Polytechnic, Melbourne

Canada

- British Columbia Institute of Technology, British Columbia
- Northern Alberta Institute of Technology, Edmonton, Alberta
- Southern Alberta Institute of Technology, Calgary, Alberta
- Lethbridge Polytechnic, Lethbridge, Alberta
- Red Deer Polytechnic, Red Deer, Alberta
- Saskatchewan Polytechnic, Saskatoon, Saskatchewan

Finland

- Savonia Polytechnic

Singapore

- Nanyang Polytechnic
- Singapore Polytechnic

Ireland

- Waterford Institute of Technology (WIT), Waterford

Malaysia

- Ungku Omar Polytechnic, Ipoh

New Zealand

- Christchurch Polytechnic Institute of Technology
- Otago Polytechnic
- Unitec Institute of Technology

Pakistan

- Saifi Polytechnic, Karachi, Sindh
- Textile Institute of Pakistan, Karachi, Sindh

Portugal

- Instituto Politécnico de Coimbra, Coimbra
- Instituto Politécnico de Leiria, Leiria
- Instituto Politécnico de Lisboa, Lisbon
- Instituto Politécnico do Porto, Porto
- ISLA - Instituto Politécnico de Gestão e Tecnologia, Porto

Tunisia

- Tunisia Polytechnic School

United States

- Institute of Technology - Clovis (IOT), Clovis, California
- Ivy Tech Community College of Indiana (Ivy Tech), 23 campuses throughout Indiana
- Fashion Institute of Technology (FIT), New York, New York
- New York City College of Technology (City Tech), Brooklyn, New York
- Pennsylvania College of Technology (Penn College), Williamsport, Pennsylvania

== Secondary education ==
There are also secondary education schools which use these words:

Argentina

- Instituto Politécnico Superior "Gral. San Martín", Rosario, Santa Fe

Singapore

- Ngee Ann Polytechnic
- Republic Polytechnic
- Temasek Polytechnic

Note: Polytechnics in Singapore provide industry-oriented education equivalent to a junior college or sixth form college.

United States

- Duncan Polytechnic High School, Fresno, California
- Francis Polytechnic High School, Los Angeles, California (was the business department of Los Angeles High School in the 1890s, and became separate in 1906)
- Long Beach Polytechnic High School, Long Beach, California
- Polytechnic School, Pasadena, California
- Baltimore Polytechnic Institute, Baltimore, Maryland
- Benson Polytechnic High School, Portland, Oregon

== See also ==
- Institute of technology
- Institute of Technology (United States)
- Polytechnic (United Kingdom)
