= Ekiti State College of Health Science and Technology =

College of Health Technology in Ekiti StateEdit

Coordinates: 7°48′35″N 5°04′56″E

Ekiti State College of Health Science and Technology, Ijero-Ekiti
- Motto: Knowledge is Power
- Type: Public
- Established: 2010
- Provost: Dr Olubamise Olufemi Moses
- Location: Ijero Ekiti, Ekiti State, Nigeria
- Website: https://eportal.escohsti-edu.ng/

Ekiti State College of Health Science and Technology, Ijero-Ekiti is a public medical college located in Ijero Ekiti, Ekiti, Nigeria. It was established in 2010 by the Ekiti State Government. The college is regulated by the National Board for Technical Education (NBTE) and the Ekiti State Ministry of Education, from which it has received full accreditation. It was established under the Ekiti State Law No. 3 of 2010.

== History ==
The college was established in 2010 by the Ekiti State Government and initially operated as a monotechnic. It was later converted to a polytechnic by the State Executive Council, presided over by Governor Biodun Oyebanji, following the report submitted by an eight-member committee constituted on March 15, 2024. The final approval for the conversion to a polytechnic was granted on February 19, 2025.

== Department and courses ==
The college comprises six schools, namely the School of Basic Medical Sciences, School of Health Information and Computer Studies, School of Therapeutic and Intervention Sciences, School of Diagnostic Sciences, School of Community Health and Public Health, and School of Environmental Health Studies. The programmes offered are; Dental Surgery Technology, Health Information Management, Health Information Management, Public Health Nursing, Institutional Administration, Community Health, Computer Science, Dental Therapy, Dispensing Opticianry, Environmental Health Technology, Health Information Management, Nutrition and Dietetics, Paramedics Technology, and Public Health Technology.

== Provost ==
The provost is a formal Director of ICT at the college, prior to his appointment Dr. Olubamise Olufemi Moses

== See also ==
- Ikirun College of Health Technology
- Ekiti State
