= Fran Bošnjaković =

Croatian thermodynamicist

- Born: April 27, 1902; Zagreb, Kingdom of Croatia-Slavonia, Austria-Hungary
- Died: October 1, 1993 (aged 91); Stuttgart, Germany
- Education: Dresden University of Technology; University of Zagreb
- Known for: Technical thermodynamics
- Scientific career
- Fields: Technical thermodynamics; Plasma physics
- Workplaces: Dresden University of Technology; Braunschweig University of Technology; University of Stuttgart; University of Belgrade; University of Zagreb
- Doctoral advisor: Richard Mollier

Fran Bošnjaković (1902–1993) was a noted Croatian thermodynamicist considered to be one of the pioneers in the development of technical thermodynamics.

Bošnjaković was born in Zagreb, where he was initially educated. He continued his education at the Technische Hochschule (Technical University) in Dresden, Germany. He obtained there a doctoral degree in engineering in 1928, and in 1931 he became a Privatdozent (university teacher) at the same Technical University.

When Hitler came into power, his further career in Germany was blocked, and he accepted in 1934 the position of an associate professor at the University of Belgrade. He moved back to the University of Zagreb as full professor in 1936. After 1945, during the Yugoslav communist regime, he was degraded to two years of forced labor. In 1951, he became rector of the University of Zagreb in Croatia, then part of Yugoslavia. However, continuing political disagreement with the communist régime in Yugoslavia made him decide to accept one of the research offers in post-war Germany.

In 1953, he started lecturing at the Technische Hochschule (Technical University) in Braunschweig in Germany, becoming the head of the Department for thermodynamics and director of the Thermotechnical institute. In 1961, he founded the Institute of Thermodynamics for Aeronautics and Astronautics at the university of Stuttgart, Germany, which he led until his retirement in 1968. There he established groups for Irreversible Thermodynamics, Mass Transfer and Thermokinetics, Radiation and Plasma, and Heat Transfer. After retirement, he spent several years as visiting professor at leading American universities.

His research covered a very wide area: problems of exergy, evaporation, binary and multi-component systems, heat and mass transfer, combustion and gasification, high temperature plasma, solar collectors and irreversibility of energy conversion in thermodynamic processes. With M. Jakob he laid down principles of nucleate bubble growth in superheated liquid.

His textbook Technische Thermodynamik, published in 1935 in Dresden, had seven improved and extended editions in Germany, and was translated into English (Technical Thermodynamics) and Russian (Tehnicheskaya termodinamika).

As one of world's leading experts in thermodynamics, professor Bošnjaković was a member of Academies in Heidelberg and Venice, Braunschweig Society of Sciences and since 1991, a corresponding member of the Croatian Academy of Sciences and Arts in Zagreb. He received a Grashof Commemorative Medal of the Verein Deutscher Ingenieure as well as Gold Medals of the Associazione Thermotechnica Italiana, and the Institut Français des combustibles et de l'énergie.
