= Polytech Nice Sophia =

French engineering college

Coordinates: 43.6150°N 7.0719°E

- Ecole polytechnique de l'université Côte d'Azur
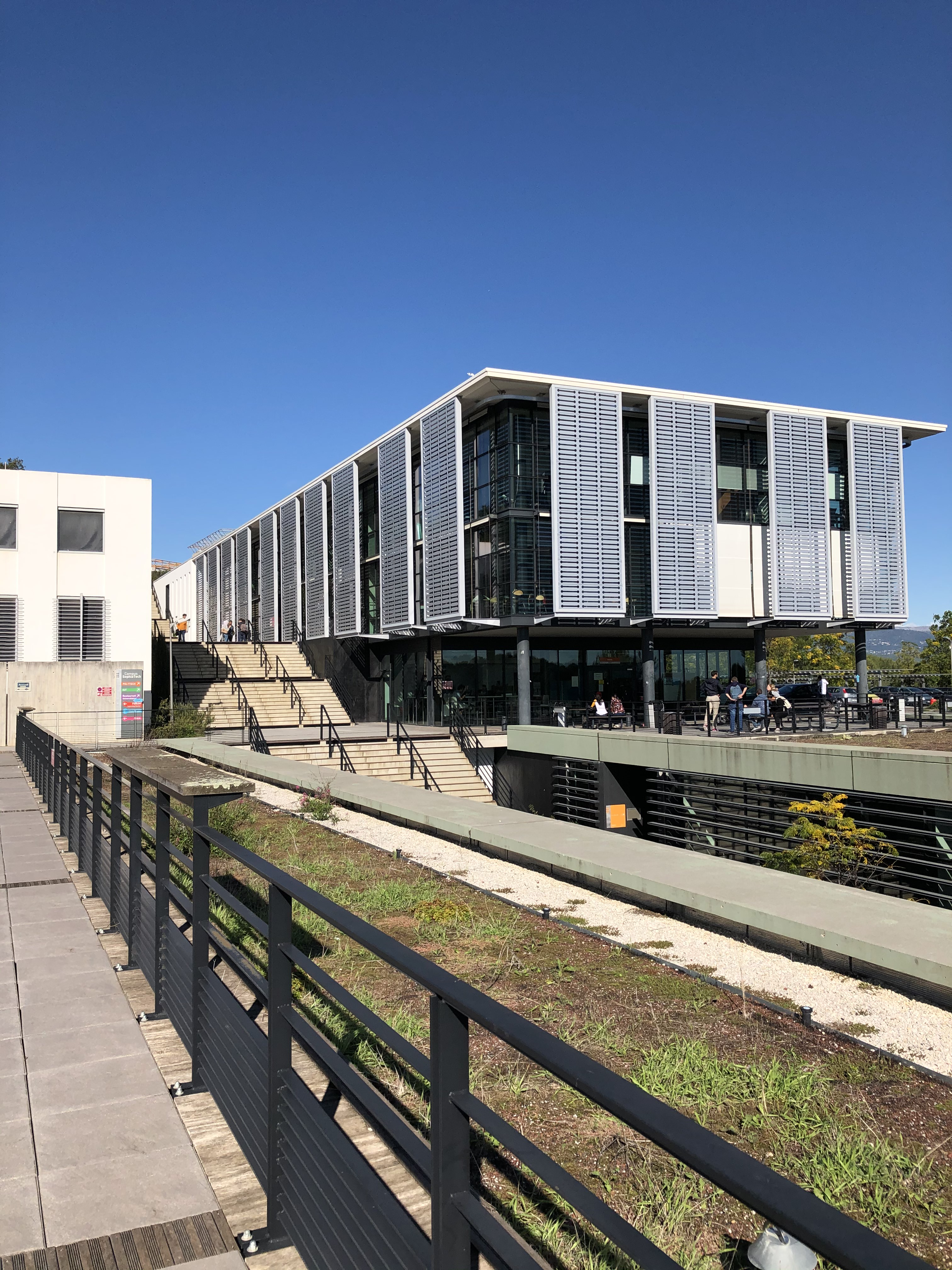
- Motto: Relevons les défis de demain
- Type: Public
- Established: 2005 (from ESINSA, ESSI & MP)
- Chairman: Alexandre Caminada
- Director: Philippe Lorenzini
- Academic staff: 75
- Administrative staff: 22
- Students: 989
- Doctoral students: 50
- Location: Sophia Antipolis, Nice, Alpes-Maritimes, Provence-Alpes-Côte d'Azur, France
- Campus: STIC
- Colors: Dodger blue; Yellow green
- Mascot: Broco le Dino
- Website: https://polytech.univ-cotedazur.fr/
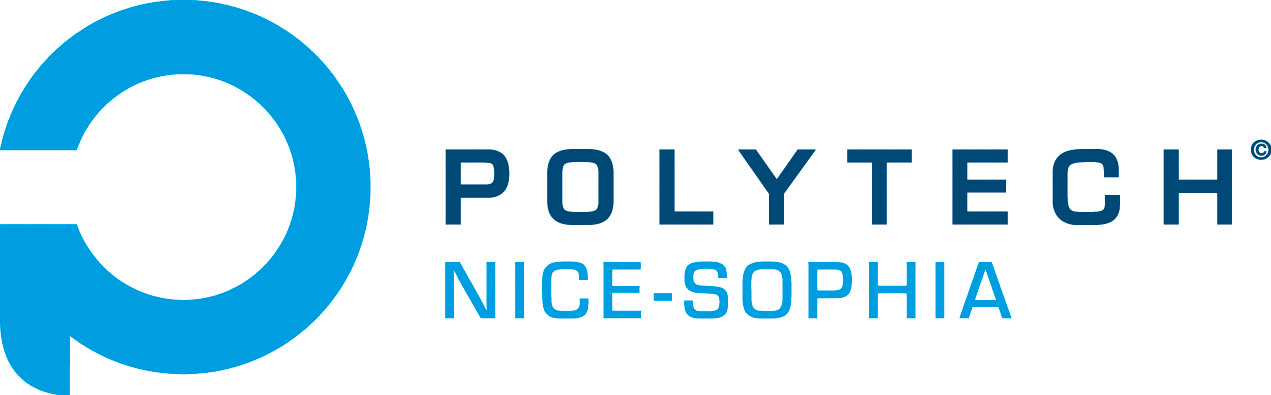

École polytechnique de l'Université Côte d'Azur (Polytech Nice Sophia or PNS) a higher education French engineering College based in the middle of the Sophia Antipolis technology park.

The school has 989 engineering students, 50 doctoral students, 75 faculty members, 22 administrative and technical staff and 7 research laboratories associated. More than 200 engineers graduate each year.

Polytech Nice Sophia is a member of the Polytech Group Network.

== History and Location ==
=== Establishing ===
Polytech Nice Sophia School is created as a result of the association of the Engineering Schools of ESINSA (École Supérieure d'Ingénieurs de Nice Sophia), ESSI (École Supérieure en Sciences Informatique) and Magisterium of Pharmacology at the publication of Decree No. 2005 - 219 at the French "Journal Officiel" on 10 March 2005. Polytech Nice Sophia is the Polytechnic Engineering unit of the Côte d'Azur University.

=== Location ===
The new Sophie-Politan campus of Nice Sophia University was inaugurated in September 2012, while the project is still not finished. Polytech campus is based on two separate area :

- The "Lucioles" area (ex Magisterium of Pharmacology) grouping PeiP, ISEM and Miage.
- The "Templier" area (ex ESSI) including every students engineering promotions (Master of Advanced Studies)

=== Administration ===
The new college is a member of Polytech Group was managed by Francis Rocca until 1 September 2007.
Philippe Gourbesville succeeds to Roger Marlin and seat as the Director of Polytech Nice Sophia considering the agreement of the School Administrative Council (AC) on 2 July 2007. Philippe Gourbesville was re-elected on 11 July 2012 for a term of 5 more years.
