= Polytech Nantes =

French engineering College

École polytechnique universitaire de Nantes Université
- Former names: IRESTE, ISITEM & ESA IGELEC
- Type: Grande école
- Established: January 2000
- Affiliations: Nantes University, Polytech group, Conférence des Grandes Ecoles
- Director: Philippe Dépincé
- Administrative staff: 200 (2019)
- Students: 1,700 (2019)
- Postgraduates: 8,000
- Doctoral students: 150
- Location: Polytech Nantes; La Chantrerie; Rue Christian Pauc; CS 50609; 44306 NANTES CEDEX 3 France, France
- Campus: multiple campuses : Nantes, Saint-Nazaire and La Roche-sur-Yon

Polytech Nantes or École polytechnique universitaire de Nantes Université (also known as ) is a grande école of engineering of Nantes University, accredited by the Commission des Titres d'Ingénieur (CTI), the French agency awarding engineering degrees. It is located in Loire Atlantique, which is in an attractive area of strong economic and demographic growth.

== Programs of study ==
=== "Ingénieur diplômé" (in French) ===
Polytech Nantes offers scientific and multidisciplinary training courses which correspond to high-level international master's degrees (Master of Science, Master of engineering with Honors). These programs have been awarded the European label EUR-ACE.

- Electronics and digital technologies
- Civil engineering
- Electrical engineering
- Process and bioprocess engineering
- Computer science
- Materials science
- Thermal and energy science
- Energies (by apprenticeship)
- Networking and telecoms systems (by apprenticeship)
- Control command of electric systems (by apprenticeship)

Scientific, technical, professional, linguistic, social and human elements are critical aspects of the curricula and the hallmarks of a French engineer..

French speaking students may attend any semester's programmes in French.

=== International programs (in English) ===
Five engineering specialties currently offer semesters taught in English:

- Computer science (Spring and Autumn – M1 and M2 level)
- Electronics and Digital Technologies (Autumn semester only - M2 level)
- Electrical engineering (Autumn semester only - M2 level)
- Process and bioprocess Engineering (Autumn semester only - M2 level)
- Thermal and Energy Sciences (Autumn semester only - M2 level)

The graduate school has agreements with more than 50 foreign universities and companies, as well as European universities via Erasmus+ exchange programs. Polytech Nantes welcomes and sends students wishing to gain experience of working abroad.

These international partnerships have allowed Polytech Nantes to develop a complete range of programs taught in English (International master's degrees):

- Master 2 Data Science / Advanced courses in data science, performing analyses and interpreting data.
- Master 2 Electrical Energy / Advanced courses in electrical energy (sustainable development, multi-source systems, energy conversion...)
- Master 2 Microalgae Bioprocess Engineering /Advanced courses to develop industrial processes for microalgae valorization.
- Master 2 Thermal Science and Energy /Advanced courses in heat transfer, fluid mechanics and energy systems.
- Master 2 Visual Computing /Advanced courses in visual information acquisition, processing, analysis and rendering.
- Master 2 Wireless Embedded Technologies /Advanced courses in the design and control of wireless communicating objects.

== Research and doctoral studies ==
Polytech'Nantes offers several Ph.D programs in Science and Technology, respectively:

- MATHSTIC ("Mathematics, Information and Telecommunications Science)
- SPI (Science for the Engineers)
- 3M (Matter, Molecules and Materials)

These Ph.D. programs are supported by several research laboratories, all associated with the CNRS:

- Digital Sciences Laboratory of Nantes (LSN)
- Electronics and Telecommunications Institute of Rennes (IETR) - Nantes campus
- Nantes Atlantique Electrical Engineering Research Institute (IREENA)
- Jean Rouxel Materials Institute (IMN)
- Institute of Research in Civil Engineering and Mechanics (GeM)
- Laboratory of Bioprocess Engineering, Environment and Agrifood (GEPEA)
- Nantes Thermokinetics Laboratory (LTeN)

== General information ==
It is located on three distinct campuses:

- "La Chantrerie" 47°16′59.16″N 1°30′51.16″W in the city of Nantes
- "Gavy" 47°15′2.11″N 2°15′29.07″W in the city of Saint-Nazaire
- "La Courtaisière in the city of La Roche-sur-Yon

The school was created in January 2000 through the merging of three existing engineering schools: ESA-IGELEC, IRESTE, and ISITEM.

== Affiliations ==
Polytech Nantes is a department of Nantes University and a member of the Polytech group, which is a network of 15 graduate engineering schools within France's leading science universities located in Marseille, Nantes, Montpellier, Nice, Annecy-Chambéry, Grenoble, Paris Upmc, Paris sud, Clermont-Ferrand, Orléans, Tours, Lyon, Lille, Nancy and Angers.
