= RepRisk =

Swiss ESG ratings company

RepRisk AG
- Type: Private
- Industry: Investment research, ESG risk analytics
- Founded: 1998
- Headquarters: Zurich, Switzerland
- Number of locations: 4
- Key people: Philipp Aeby (CEO)
- Website: www.reprisk.com

RepRisk AG is an environmental, social, and corporate governance (ESG) data science company based in Zurich, Switzerland, specializing in ESG and business-conduct risk research, and quantitative solutions.

The company runs an online due-diligence database that allows clients to monitor and assess the risk exposure of companies, infrastructure projects, sectors, and countries related to 28 ESG issues. The issues are mapped to the 10 principles of the UN Global Compact, the Sustainability Accounting Standards Board (SASB) Materiality Map, and the United Nations Sustainable Development Goals (SDGs).

On a daily basis, RepRisk assesses ESG risks such as environmental degradation, human rights abuses, child labor, forced labor, fraud, and corruption that can impact an organization's reputation, financial profitability, or lead to compliance issues. Financial institutions and corporations use RepRisk to prevent and mitigate ESG and business conduct risks related to their operations, business relationships, and investments.

The RepRisk database systematically identifies ESG risks by analyzing over 100,000 sources per day in 20 major business languages. As of July 2020, the database covered more than 150,000 public and private companies, and over 40,000 infrastructure projects reported to have links to ESG risks, as well as ESG risks related to all countries and 34 different sectors. It also includes data on ESG issues and topics, over 20,000 NGOs, and over 15,000 governmental bodies.

== History ==
RepRisk was formed in 1998 as ECOFACT, a Zurich-based environmental and social risk consultancy focused on the financial sector. In 2006, its ESG risk database was created at the request of UBS, and in 2010, RepRisk split from the consultancy and became an independent company.

== Methodology ==
=== Research scope and process ===
RepRisk screens, on a daily basis, over 100,000 public sources and external stakeholders, including international and local print and online media, news websites, newsletters, NGOs, governmental bodies, think tanks, blogs and Twitter, in 20 major business languages. This screening identifies companies and projects linked to ESG-related risk. RepRisk monitors 28 ESG issues (for example local pollution, child labor or tax evasion) and 67 topic tags, or "hot topics" (such as palm oil, arctic drilling, indigenous people, coal, or water scarcity). The research scope is defined in accordance with international standards and norms, such as the ten principles of the United Nations Global Compact (UNGC) and Sustainability Accounting Standards Board (SASB).

To achieve consistent data over time, RepRisk's database uses strict, rules-based processes that incorporate both artificial intelligence and machine learning with human intelligence. The following steps outline the high level RepRisk screening process:

1. Sources are screened through the company's proprietary AI tool that identifies risk incidents through text and metadata extraction from unstructured content, followed by multi-lingual de-duplication and clustering processes.
2. An analyst studies adverse incidents, defines severity and novelty of each, using international standards.
3. Relevant entities (companies, projects, sectors, and countries) are linked to the risk event, assigned a title, and a summary is completed.
4. The compiled news passes a quality check prior to being released to the RepRisk ESG risk platform database.

=== RepRisk Index (RRI) ===
The RepRisk Index (RRI) is a proprietary algorithm that dynamically captures and quantifies the reputational exposure to ESG and business conduct risks. The RRI is a quantitative measure ranging from 1 (lowest) to 100 (highest).

Companies that have been exposed to higher levels of criticism in the past are less sensitive to new adverse events and allegations in comparison to a company that experiences a first-time incident. If a company does not experience new criticism, their score will eventually drop to zero over a maximum period of two years.

A current RRI value indicates the current media and stakeholder exposure. The Peak RRI is an overall risk exposure indicator that indicates the highest level of criticism over the past two years.

The RRI score is calculated based on a number of factors, including the influence of the source of the information, the frequency and timing of criticisms, and the novelty and severity of the criticism.

=== RepRisk Rating (RRR) ===
The RepRisk Rating (RRR) is a letter rating (AAA to D) and is similar to a credit rating. It facilitates benchmarking and ESG integration. Available only to companies, it combines a company's own ESG risk exposure with the ESG risk exposure of the countries and sectors in which the company has been exposed to risks. Both the Rating and the RRI are updated daily for all companies in the database.

=== RepRisk UN Global Compact Violator Flag ===
This indicator identifies companies with a high potential risk of violating one or more of the ten UNGC Principles. The flag allows users to see if the UNGC violations are primarily linked to the operations or to the supply chain of a company.

== Data products and services ==
RepRisk data is available in various formats and products and is searchable online:

- Benchmarking Briefs benchmark the ESG risk exposure for up to ten companies.
- Company Reports outline the ESG and business conduct risks for a single company, and are available via PDF.
- Supplier Monitoring Briefs and Portfolio Monitoring Reports are also available on a monthly or quarterly basis and identify companies in a supplier list or investment portfolio that are most exposed to ESG risks, and are most likely to violate internal policies, ethical guidelines, or international standards and are available via PDF.

== Publications and research ==
=== Annual Most Controversial Companies Report ===
Since 2013, RepRisk releases a yearly ranking of the top ten most controversial companies in the world, related to ESG issues. The ranking is based on the companies that have the highest RRI over a particular year.

Rank	2009	2010	2012	2013	2014	2015	2016	2017	2018	2019
1	Peanut Corporation of America	Transocean.	Tazreen Fashions	FIFA	Chonghaejin Marine	Ruihai International Logistics Co	1Malaysia Development Berhad	The Weinstein Company	Lion Air	Technischer Überwachungsverein
2	Vedanta Resources	BP	Olympus Corporation	Punta Fa SL (Mango)	Takata Corporation	Uber	Mossack Fonseca	Kobe Steel	Xe-Pian Xe-Namnoy Power Co (PNPC)	Jiangsu Tianjiayi Chemical Co
3	Newmont Mining Corporation	Vedanta Resources	Lonmin	Comigel	Chang Guann Company	Samarco	Samarco	J&F Investimentos	Punjab National Bank	Hacienda Health Care
4	Rio Tinto	ExxonMobil	News Corp	HSBC	Zhongrong Metal Products	Takata Corporation.	Jiangsu Changlong Chemicals Co	Appleby Global Group Services. (Paradise Papers)	Changsheng Bio-Technology	Wilke Waldecker Fleisch- und Wurstwaren GmbH & Co
5	Walmart	Foxconn	Samsung Group	Findus Group.	Uber	Blue Bell Creameries	Daewoo Shipbuilding & Marine Engineering Unaoil	Stalreiniging Barneveld (Chickfriend)	JBS Tolleson	Burning Sun Entertainment Co
6	Siemens	Chevron Group	HSBC	Fonterra Co-operative Group	FIFA	HSBC Private Bank		Equifax.	Danske Bank Estonia	Lubrizol Corp20
7	KBR	BG Group	Reebok	GlaxoSmithKline	Dongguan Shinyang Electronics	Sony	Rizal Commercial Banking Corporation	Rolls-Royce Holdings	Cambridge Analytica	Guangzhou R&F Properties
8	ExxonMobil	Royal Dutch Shell	ING Bank	BNP Paribas	General Motors	Volkswagen	Lotte Corporation	Odebrecht SA	Autostrade per l'Italia SpA	Samherji hf
9	BP	Sinar Mas Group	Wyeth	ICAP	KT ENS Corporation	FIFA	Volkswagen	PDVSA	Greenyard	Henan Coal Gas Group Co
10	BHP Billiton	Magyar Aluminium	Telia Company	Samsung	Neiman Marcus	1Malaysia Development Berhad / Odebrecht / General Motors / Honda	Odebrecht SA	Transnet.	Keppel Offshore & Marine	Intercontinental Terminals Co

=== Annual Most Controversial Projects Report ===
Since 2013, RepRisk releases a yearly ranking of the top ten most controversial projects in the world, related to ESG issues. The ranking is based on the projects that have the highest RRI over a particular year.

Rank	2013	2014	2015	2016	2017	2018
1	Rana Plaza	Kunshan Zhongrong Metmmigration Factory	Rajput Polyester Factory	Fengcheng Power Plant Phase 3	Grenfell Tower	Winter Cherry Trade and Leisure Center
2	Pegasus Pipeline	Buenavista del Cobre Mine (Cananea Mine)	Valenzuela Slipper Factory	Hong'ao Landfill (Hong Ao Landfill; Hongao Construction Waste Dump)	Ctrip Day Care Center	Sanchi Tanker
3	Big Gossan Mine	Soma Komur Isletmeleri Mine	Vostochnyi Spaceport (Vostochny Kosmodrom)	ETP Crude Pipeline Project (Bakken pipeline; Dakota Access Pipeline)	Fu Yuan Lu Leng 999 Vessel	Craon Celia Factory
4	Four Rivers Refurbishment Project	Abbot Point Port Expansion	Tia Mia Gold Mining Project	Aliso Canyon Natural Gas Storage Facility	Brook House Immigration Removal Centre	Polokwane Factory
5	Fukushima Daiichi Nuclear Power Plant	Mauna Ocean Resort	Angra 3 Nuclear Reactor	Sports Direct Shirebrook Warehouse	Nord Stream 2 gas pipeline	One Belt One Road Initiative
6	Foxconn Zhengzhou Technology Park	2022 FIFA World Cup	Hpakant Gyi Jade Mine / Carmichael Coal Mine / Rail Project (Galilee Basin Project)	Petroquimica Mexicana de Vinilo (PMV) Plant	JalabiyaCement Works	Patel Dam
7	Gyama Polymetallic Mine	Mount Polley Mine	Ilha Pura Olympic Village	Agua Zarca Hydroelectric Project	OPL 245 Oil Block	Hyde County Farm
8	Mtwara Dar es Salaam Pipeline	Qingdao Port	Long Lake Oil Sands Project	Tongi Packaging Plant (Tampaco Foils)	Changwon Jinhae Shipyard	Tuticorin Copper Smelter Plant
9	Rustenburg Chrome Mine	Moscow Metro	Formosa Fun Coast Water Park	Angra dos Reis Nuclear Complex (Almirante Alvaro Alberto Nuclear Complex) / Jinshangou Coal Mine	Guangzhou No 7 Thermal Power Plant	Ituango Hydroelectric Power Project
10	San Jose del Progreso Gold and Silver	Dan River Steam Station	Grand Mosque Expansion Project		Imperial Pacific Resort Hotel	Barcarena Alumina Refinery

=== Research ===
- The Effect Of Bad News On Credit Risk (Research Study): Julian Koelbel, a PhD student at the Swiss Federal Institute of Technology (ETH) in Zurich, used RepRisk data in the research study: The effect of bad news on credit risk: a media based view of the pricing of corporate social responsibility. The paper, which won an Award for Excellence in Responsible Investment Research at the UN PRI's annual Academic Network conference in 2013, highlighted that more negative news on CSR issues are associated with higher credit default swap spreads. The study is published in the Strategic Management Journal.
- ESG Alpha in China (Research Study): Michael Barnett of the Centre for Corporate Reputation at Oxford University, and Jimmy Chen, Andreas Hoepner and Qian Li from the Centre for Responsible Banking & Finance at the University of St Andrews, used RepRisk data as the basis for their recent research paper, "ESG Alpha in China." The research paper, which investigated the effect of ESG risks on the share performance of Chinese firms and found that ESG criteria can be used to generate alpha for investments in Chinese companies, won the European PRI award in the category of Investment Strategy.
- Kepler Cheuvreux: Kepler Cheuvreux and Affectio Mutandi included RepRisk data in their Soft Law Violation & Liability research report, one of a series of reports produced by the company surrounding business ethics. Kepler Cheuvreux also featured RepRisk in its "The Responsible Investor Playbook" published in 2016.
- RepRisk and CSRHub published a joint research report in May 2015 on the relationship between perceived CSR performance (based on CSRHub data) and reputational risk exposure related to ESG issues (based on RepRisk data).
- ESG Performance of European investment funds.
- The effect of bad news on reputation and share price: An empirical survey.
- Does Corporate Social Responsibility Benefit Society? Jun Li, University of Michigan, Stephen M. Ross School of Business, and Di (Andrew) Wu, University of Michigan, Stephen M. Ross School of Business (2017).
- The Relationship between Sustainability Performance and Sustainability Disclosure—Reconciling Voluntary Disclosure Theory and Legitimacy Theory
- How Media Coverage of Corporate Social Irresponsibility Increases Financial Risk
- Corporate Social Responsibility and Firm Reputation Risk
- The Price of Ignoring ESG Risks
- Kepler Cheuvreux: Kepler Cheuvreux released their 2016 special report on tools in SRI-ESG field based on RepRisk data, including use cases, links with academic research, and underlying methodological assumptions.
- (2019) Citi Global Data Insights: Citi Global Data Insights published The Rise of AI in ESG Evolution in 2019, featuring RepRisk's proprietary research methodology.
