= Polytech Group (France) =

French public technology university system

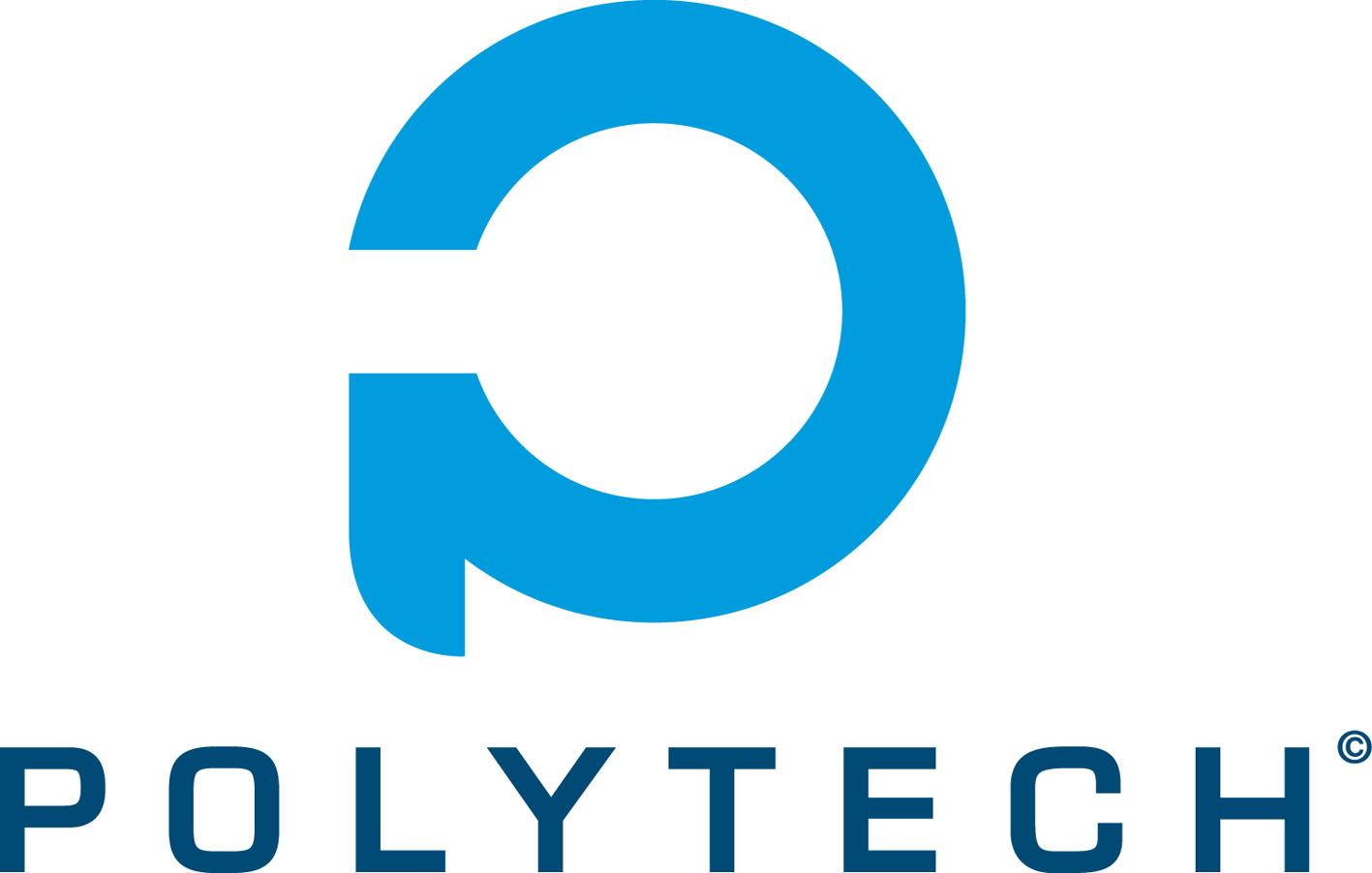
- Motto: Relevons les défis de demain
- Motto in English: Let's meet the challenges of tomorrow
- Type: Public
- Established: 2004
- Students: 17,500
- Undergraduates: 2,120
- Postgraduates: 90,000 (3,800/year)
- Location: Angers; Annecy-Chambery; Clermont-Ferrand; Dijon; Grenoble; Lille; Lyon; Marseille; Montpellier; Nancy; Nantes; Nice Sophia Antipolis; Orléans; Paris; Tours, France
- Colors: Dodgerblue
- Website: www.polytech-reseau.org

The Polytech Group (Réseau des écoles Polytech, or Écoles polytechniques, in French) is a French network of 15 public graduate schools of engineering (Grandes Écoles) within France's leading technological universities:

- 15 schools + 4 partner schools
- over 100 engineering majors
- 17,500 students
- 3800 graduates p.a.
- 1350 doctoral students

All the schools in the group offer are accredited by the Commission des Titres d'Ingénieur (CTI) to award the French Diplôme d'Ingénieur in various specialties. In France, engineering studies are organized according to framework of the European Higher Education Area; the French engineering degree is a master's degree obtained after validation of 300 ECTS credits.

== List of schools and engineering majors ==
- Polytech Angers
- Polytech Annecy-Chambery
- Polytech Clermont-Ferrand
  - Biology
  - Civil Engineering
  - Electrical Engineering
  - Mathematics and Mathematical modelling
  - Physics
- Polytech Grenoble
  - Computer Science, Network and Multimedia Communication
  - Electronics
  - Geotechnics and Civil Engineering
  - Materials Science
  - Risks Prevention Science
  - Health Technology Information
- Polytech Lille
  - Mechanical Engineering
  - Software Engineering and Statistics
  - Geotechnics and Civil Engineering
  - Geomatics and Urban Engineering
  - Biological and Food Engineering
  - Electrical and Computer Engineering
  - Measurement Systems and Applied Business
  - Materials Science
  - Production System - Operations Engineering
- Polytech Lyon
  - Computer Science Engineering
  - Materials Science and Engineering
  - Applied Mathematics and Modeling
  - Mechanical Engineering
  - Biomedical Engineering
  - Industrial systems and Robotics (Roanne)
- Polytech Marseille
- Polytech Montpellier
  - Computer Science and Management
  - Materials Science and Engineering
  - Electrical Engineering
  - Water Science and Engineering
  - Energetic - Renewables Energies
  - Food Science and Engineering
  - Mechanical Engineering and Interaction
  - Energectics and Renewable Energies
- Polytech Nancy
- Polytech Nantes
  - Masters of engineering science
    - Electronics and digital technologies (Nantes)
    - Electrical engineering (Saint-Nazaire)
    - Civil Engineering (Saint-Nazaire)
    - Process and Bioprocess engineering (Saint-Nazaire)
    - Engineering Computer Science (Nantes)
    - Materials Science (Nantes)
    - Thermal science (Nantes)
    - Energy and Mechanics (Saint-Nazaire)
    - Information systems, networks and telecommunications (La Roche-sur-Yon)
  - Masters of engineering science
    - Computer sciences (data science, visual computing)
    - Automatics, electronics, electrical energy (electrical, wireless, embedded technologies)
    - Mechanics (thermal science, energy)
    - Process and bioprocess engineering ( Microalgae Bioprocess Engineering)
- Polytech Nice Sophia
  - Electronics
  - Computer Science
  - Bioteechnology
  - Applied Mathematics and Mathematical modelling
- Polytech Orléans
  - Mechanical Engineering
  - Electronics and Optics
  - Civil Engineering
  - Production
  - Building Intelligence
- Polytech Paris Saclay
  - Electronics and Board Systems
  - Computer Sciences
  - Optronics
  - Materials Science
- Polytech Sorbonne (formerly Polytech Paris-UPMC)
  - Electronics and Computer Sciences
  - Geotechnics and Geophysics (Earth Sciences)
  - Robotics
  - Industrial Computing
  - Industrial Mechanics
  - Agribusiness
  - Materials Chemistry
- Polytech Tours
  - Electronics
  - Computer Science

== Partner schools ==
In 2021, four schools are associated to Polytech Group. They share the same values, but a different admission process.

- ENSIM (Le Mans)
- ESGT Le CNAM (Le Mans)
- ISEL (Le Havre)
- ESIREM (Dijon)
