= Technopole =

A technopole, commonly referred to as a high-technology cluster or tech hub, refers to a center of high-tech manufacturing and information-based quaternary industry. The term was coined by Allen J. Scott in 1990 to describe regions in Southern California which showed a rapid growth in high technology fields. This term now has a broader scope to describe regions worldwide dedicated to technological innovation. Such regions can be centers of rapid economic and technological growth as a result of agglomeration effects.

Technopoles are one type of industry cluster. The components of a technopole usually comprise local firms, universities, financial institutions and public research organizations. Technopoles may be developed by the private sector or by the co-operation or partnership between the public and private sectors. Governments of all levels promote them as a panacea for economies hurt by economic restructuring. Large corporations and small business operate within these high technology areas. Networking between companies is important and made possible by technological advances and facilitate technology transfer. Technopoles are combined technological and business centers specifically established around recognized educational and research institutes.

== Definitions ==
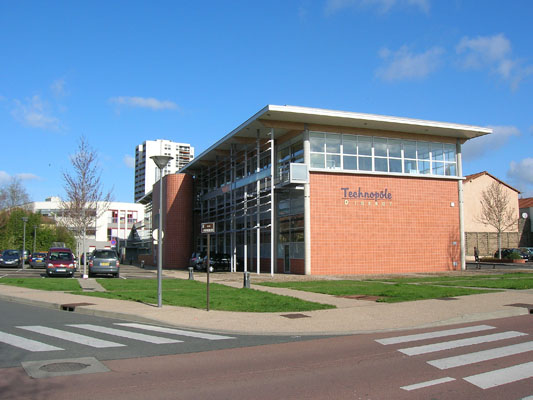
The Technopole Diderot Roanne, 2008.

There are several definitions for "technopole" in an international context, whereby focus is usually placed on the existence of four factors:

- First, a critical mass of R&D facilities which carry out research in one or more relevant areas and which have established the appropriate infrastructure.
- Second, the immediate spatial vicinity to university institutions is essential in order to link research to instruction.
- The third criterion is the presence of competent companies as source of demand for R&D competence and "users" of know-how generated at the Technopole on the international market.
- Finally, there must be sufficient interest to provide investments to enable technology-oriented start-ups and spin-offs.

Factors important to investors include:

- Good buildings and building sites
- An attractive environmental setting
- Excellent highway access and proximity to an international airport
- Excellent international tele-communication facilities
- Good quality housing for managers and,
- Easy access to a substantial pool of well trained and motivated labour

Technopoles are also vulnerable to global trends and can dissolve quickly if they are not properly supported. Technopoles have to be flexible and willing to experiment with new ideas to be seen as a global competitor. Governments and corporations tend to continue to heavily invest in technopoles in hopes of gaining economic prosperity.

== Technopoles in the world ==
=== Africa ===
Cape Town is considered Africa's tech hub. Nearby Stellenbosch also features a collection of tech companies. Furthermore, regions of Pretoria, Johannesburg, and East Rand have concentrations of R&D facilities.

=== Asia ===
In Japan, technopoles were planned and developed by the Ministry of International Trade and Industry (MITI). Since 1983, there have been over 25 technopoles in Japan as designated by MITI. Some of the most successful technopoles in Japan include Okayama, Hiroshima, Yamaguchi and Kumamoto.

UNIDO VietNam (United Nations Industrial Development Organization) has compiled in 2015 a list of Technopoles in the ASEAN Economic Community in a report titled "Economic Zones in the ASEAN" written by Arnault Morisson.

=== Australia ===
In Australia, technopoles include the Technology Precinct Bentley WA, La Trobe Research and Development Park, Ballarat Technology Park VIC, The Australian Technology Park NSW, Brisbane Technology Park QLD, Tasmanian Technopark and Adelaide University Research Park SA.

=== Europe ===
Technopoles in Germany include the IT-Cluster Rhine-Main-Neckar, the largest IT cluster in Europe.

Technopoles in the United Kingdom include counties such as Berkshire and Hampshire in the "Western Crescent" west of London, and Hertfordshire to the north. In London, East London Tech City is a notable technology cluster. The area around Cambridge is known as 'Silicon Fen' due to the concentration of software and other technology companies and the University of Cambridge's research output. Manchester in North West England has attracted a number of national and international technology companies, along with a growing startup sector.

In France, there are technopoles located near Rennes, Grenoble, Toulouse, Lyon and Paris. The first French technopole is Sophia Antipolis, near the cities of Nice, Cannes and Antibes. An important technology cluster is "Paris-Saclay", consisting of universities, research centers and start-ups.

Writer Joel Stratte-McClure of Time Magazine described a technopole in southern France called Sophia Antipolis which had 1,200 companies in a sprawling development twenty minutes away from the airport in Nice. According to the report, the technopole featured hiking trails and jogging paths and riding stables and golf courses and signs which indicate the names of various species of plants, and with street names which were "slightly pretentious" such as "Rue Dostoevski" and "Rue Albert Einstein" criss-crossing rolling hills with pine trees. There are reflecting pools, although the layout was criticized as somewhat "confusing" for taxi drivers.

The Technopole Program of Lower Austria is a trendsetter in implementing the linkage of education/training, research and business. Lower Austria's three Technopoles are already setting international standards: Technopole Krems in the fields of biotech and regenerative medicine, Technopole Tulln in environmental biotechnology and agrobiotechnology, Technopole Wiener Neustadt in microsystems engineering, tribology and medical systems technology.

In Italy, a new technopole called Human Technopole and specialized in life sciences is under development in Milan. The most important Italian technology park (International Centre for Theoretical Physics, AREA Science Park, ELETTRA) with basic research is located in Trieste.

=== North America ===
Silicon Valley is widely considered the most innovative technopole in the world. It is located in the San Francisco Bay area of California. The area consists of a 70 kilometre by 15 kilometre radius stretching from Palo Alto to San Jose. In the late 1950s, there were little computing and technology jobs in the region, this quickly changed in the 1970s and 1980s where in 1985 there was a reported 56,126 jobs in the high-tech field. Frederick Terman, a professor at Stanford University who later became the Dean of electrical engineering, initiated many R&D initiatives in Silicon Valley. Terman helped his students, such as William Hewlett and David Packard, to initiate their own companies and at times even personally invested in them. In 1951, Terman also helped to establish Stanford Research Park.

Universities in and surrounding Silicon Valley have provided a stream of students who take interest in projects and companies within Silicon Valley. With the various numbers of small companies in the area, it is common for employees to move from one company to another. Employees tend to maintain informal social connections with past coworkers which expand professional and social networks. These expanded networks have enabled an exchange of information resulting in the formation of new businesses, research, and development opportunities. Silicon Valley remains one of the leading technopoles of the world to date with its entrepreneurs, its workforce and its base of investors.

Massachusetts Route 128 is another technopole located in the United States. Route 128 was a stretch of highway in the Greater Boston area with many research and industrial facilities The route linked many towns in the greater Boston area and many technology firms relocated there for its proximity to universities such as the Massachusetts Institute of Technology (MIT), Cambridge and Harvard.

MIT played an integral role in establishing Route 128 as a technopole. MIT was established in 1861 as a technical university. After World War II, MIT encouraged technological innovation through commercially oriented research. Funding for research projects came from large corporations such as GE, Eastern Kodak, and DuPont, as well as the federal government. In 1930, the Division of Industrial Cooperation and Research, which solicited research contracts from companies, was discontinued, although MIT maintained its capacity to solicit corporate contracts. Many of research projects included electronic innovations and projects for the federal government. In 1941, the Office of Scientific Research and Development (OSRD) was created. During the 1940s and 1950s, MIT received one third of the OSRD's contracts, which was estimated at $330 million in contracts for research projects. Harvard and other local universities also received funding for research projects alongside MIT. This area was named “Research Row”. Unlike Frederick Terman's approach of aiding start-up companies within Stanford University, MIT had a strict policy which would not invest in start-up companies of its students, as investing was considered risky and inconsistent with their policies. Despite MIT choosing not to invest in start-up organizations around the region, there were many technology firms that provided funding. MIT continues to solicit contracts from corporations and is still highly regarded as an institution that is a leader in technological innovations.

Other technopoles in the United States include places such as Austin, Denver, Huntsville, Alabama, Lafayette, Indiana, Madison, Wisconsin, Philadelphia, Raleigh, North Carolina (commonly known as the Research Triangle), and Seattle.

== See also ==
- Science park
