= Polytech Nancy =

French grande école school

- Former names: Ecole Supérieure des Sciences et Technologies de l'Ingénieur de Nancy (ESSTIN), Institut des Sciences de l'Ingénieur de Nancy (ISIN)
- Type: Public Grandes écoles
- Established: 1960
- Chairperson: Gaëtan BLAISON
- Director: Eric Gnaedinger
- Academic staff: 80 (2013)
- Students: 800 (2013)
- Location: Nancy, Lorraine, France; 48.6595759°N 6.1878133°E
- Campus: Suburban, in Vandoeuvre-lès-Nancy
- Website: polytech-nancy.univ-lorraine.fr

Polytech Nancy ([pɔlitɛk nɑ̃si]), formerly known as École polytechnique universitaire de Lorraine (French pronunciation: [ekɔl pɔlitɛknik də lynivɛʁsite də lɔʁɛn]), is a French grande école located in Nancy. It was created in 1960 under the name of ISIN, was renamed Ecole Supérieure des Sciences et Technologies de l'Ingénieur de Nancy or ESSTIN in 1985. It merged into the University of Lorraine in 2012, and joined the Polytech Group in 2017. The school teaches to about 800 students at any given time, and, as of 2013, more than 4500 engineers have graduated.

The 5-year engineering formation delivers a Master of Science and includes a 2-year specialisation. At the end of the third year, the students have to choose between the 2 main axis of the formation : GEMMES (Mechanical engineering) or ISYS (Systems engineering), then they pick their specialty for the last year.

== Specialization ==
- GEMMES : Energy, Materials, Mechanical, Environmental and Structural Engineering
  - MFE : Fluid Mechanics and Energetics
  - MS : Materials and Structures
    - Optional specialisation in Health Technologies Engineering : study of medical technologies
  - IE :Industry and Environment
- ISYS : Systems Engineering
  - CSS : Systems Command and Monitoring (e.g. Automation)
  - MSS : Industrial Maintenance and Systems Security
  - SRI : Communication and Network Engineering
