= Trackinsight =

Financial technology company in Biot, France

- Type: Private
- Industry: Financial Technology
- Founded: 2014; 12 years ago
- Founder: Jean-René Giraud and Koris International
- Headquarters: Sophia Antipolis, France
- Area served: Worldwide
- Key people: Philippe Malaise
- Products: Exchange-traded Fund data and selection services
- Number of employees: 30 (2024)
- Parent: Kepler Cheuvreux
- Website: www.trackinsight.com

Trackinsight is a French financial technology company headquartered in Biot. The company offers global Exchange-traded Fund (ETF) data and selection services for professional investors, advisors, institutions and ETF industry participants.

As of 2024, the firm operates in 6 countries with 30 employees.

== History ==
Trackinsight started in 2014 by late Jean-René Giraud, co-founder and board member of Koris International.

The platform spun off from Koris International on October 17, 2016, when Trackinsight raised €2,500,000 from NewAlpha Asset Management and Aviva Group.

Trackinsight CEO Jean-René Giraud died on June 16, 2022.

In 2024, Kepler Cheuvreux, an independent European financial services firm, acquired a majority stake in Trackinsight, becoming the company's principal shareholder.

== Products and Services ==
Trackinsight’s core business focuses on providing ETF data, due diligence reports, portfolio analytics tools, enterprise solutions, and advisory services. It also offers free access to a global ETF screener, comparison tool, personal watchlists, and dedicated channels for thematic, ESG, and fixed income investing.

Global View

Trackinsight’s Global View is flagship data offering that covers over 7,000 ETFs listed worldwide. North American clients can access Global View from Trackinsight’s distribution partner, Nasdaq.

Global ETF Survey

Trackinsight releases an annual global survey with professional investors highlighting activity in the ETF space. The Global ETF Survey 2021 supported by IHS Markit and J.P. Morgan Asset Management polled 373 professional investors from 18 countries who oversee a total of $347 billion in ETF assets and more than half having over 40% of their total portfolio invested in ETFs.

ESG Investing Platform

In January 2021, Trackinsight launched an ESG investing platform, called the ESG Observatory. The ESG investing platform was developed in partnership with independent ESG verifier Conser, and with support from the SDG Investors Partnership of the United Nations Conference on Trade and Development.

The platform’s features include key ESG investment trends, comparison of the different ESG strategies offered by ETF issuers and measurement of which funds are contributing most towards meeting the United Nations Sustainable Development Goals.

Thematic Investing Platform

On October 22, 2021, Trackinsight launched a new classification system for thematic ETFs with support from Legal & General Investment Management and ROBO Global.

Fixed Income Investing Platform

In February 2022, by collaborating with iShares and Jane Street, Trackinsight launched the Fixed Income Investing hub to build a comprehensive research and analysis portal dedicated to fixed income investing.

Technology Services

Trackinsight provides tools, data and analytics for institutions in the ETF industry.

== See also ==
- Exchange-traded fund
- Financial technology
- Investing
- Environmental, social and corporate governance
