= Sophia Antipolis =

Technology park in Provence-Alpes-Côte d'Azur, France

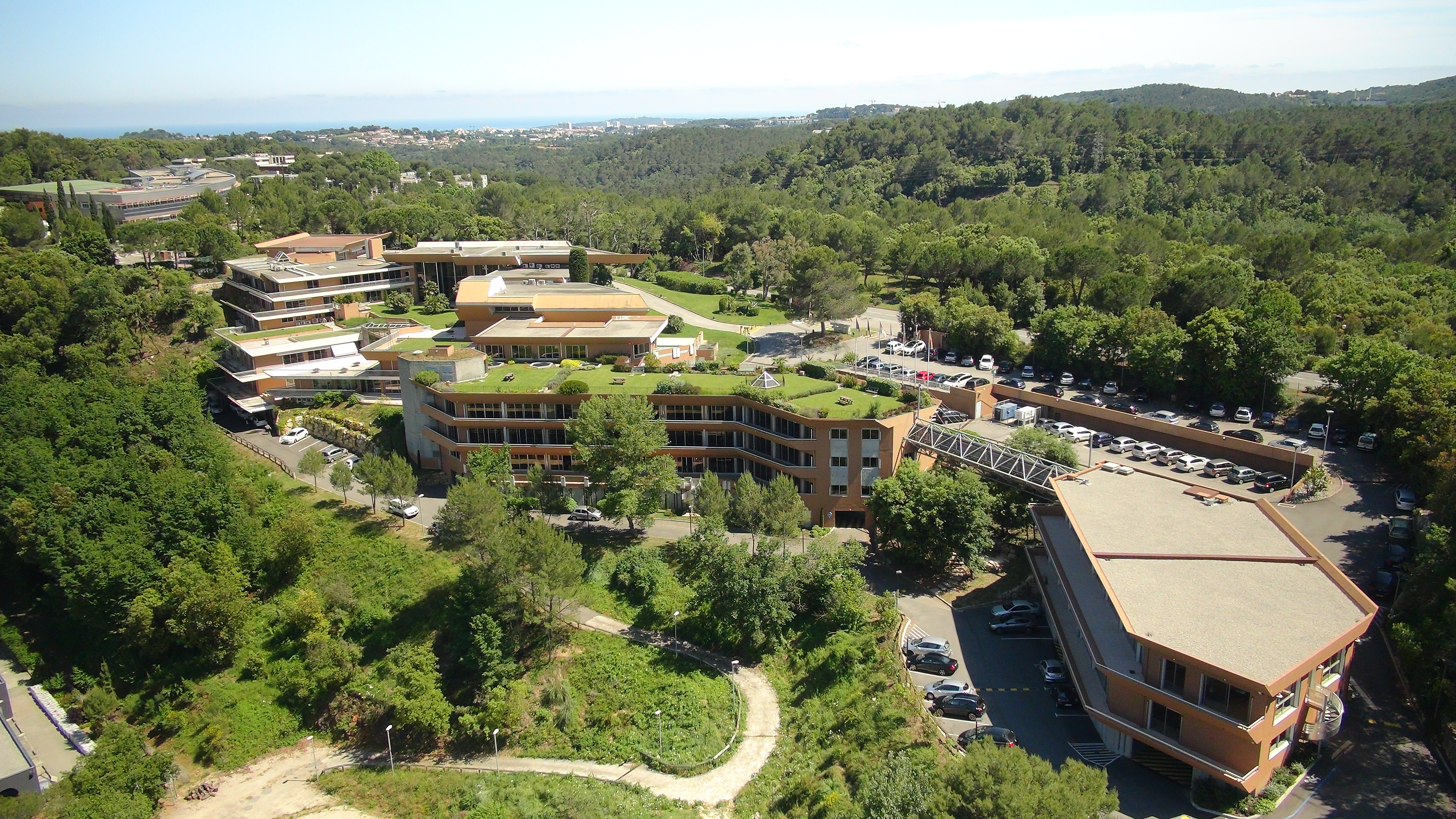
- Aerial view of a company's HQ at Sophia Antipolis

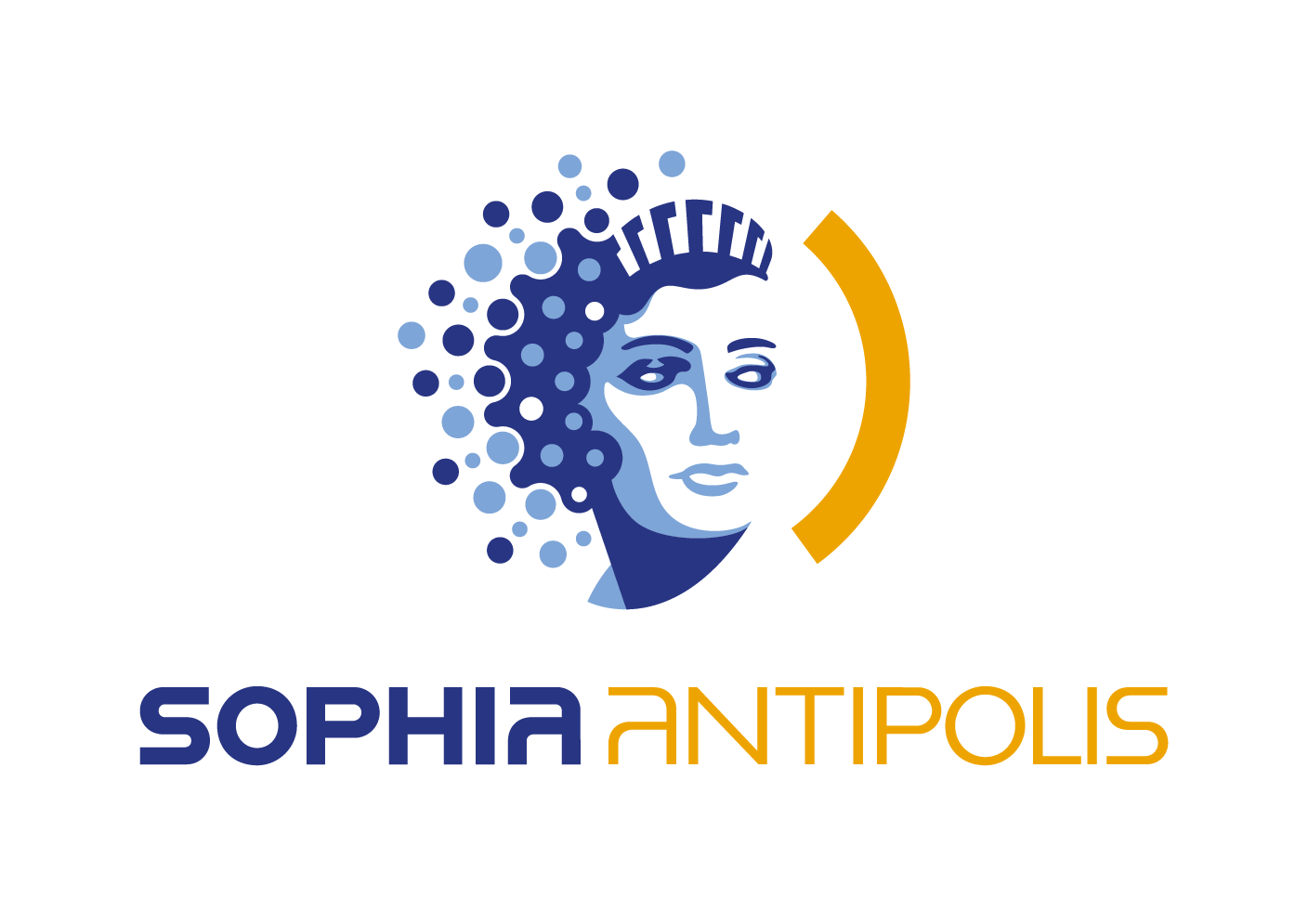
- Logo
- Etymology: Greek: (σοφία, sophía) (wisdom), Greek: (Ἀντίπολις, antipolis) ("opposite city" from its position on the opposite side of the Var estuary from Nice, also former name of Antibes, part of the technology park)
- Interactive map of Sophia Antipolis
- Location within France Location within Provence-Alpes-Côte d'Azur
- Coordinates: 43.6155°N 7.0550°E
- Country: France
- Region: Provence-Alpes-Côte d'Azur
- Communes: Antibes, Biot, Mougins, Valbonne, Vallauris
- Postal codes: 06220 (Vallauris), 06250 (Mougins), 06410 (Biot), 06560 (Valbonne), 06600 (Antibes)
- Website: sophia-antipolis.fr

Sophia Antipolis is a 2,400 hectare technology park in southeast France, and as of 2021 home to 2,500 companies, valued today at more than 5.6 billion euros and employing more than 38,000 people counting more than 80 nationalities. The park is known to be Europe's first science and technology hub. The technology park is also a platform, cluster and creation-hub for start-ups.

The "technopole" houses primarily companies in the fields of computing, electronics, telecommunication, pharmacology and biotechnology. Several institutions of higher learning are also located here, along with the European headquarters of W3C, ETSI, European Society of Cardiology, etc.

The park is supported by the Sophia Antipolis Foundation." The foundation's honorary chairman is Pierre Laffitte and its president is Jean-Pierre Mascarelli, who is also president of SYMISA, the Sophia Antipolis Joint Association, which is "responsible for managing land, equipment, marketing and upkeeping the park and is involved with coordination activities for harmonious development of the technology park."

== Naming ==
Sophia Antipolis is named after Sophie Glikman-Toumarkine, the wife of French Senator Pierre Laffitte, founder of the park, and, Sophia, the Greek word for wisdom, and Antipolis, the ancient (Greek) name of a nearby seaside town Antibes. Many of the roads within the technology park have Greek names.

The park is also termed a "technopole".

== History ==
Gérald Hanning was the consultant advisor to the DATAR for this industrial/scientific complex created 1970 to 1984.

French Senator Pierre Laffitte conceived the idea of Sophia Antipolis, calling for decentralization and "rural branch of the capital".

In 2016, the Mouratoglou Tennis Academy was relocated from Montreuil to Sophia Antipolis.

== Location ==
The technology park lies over an area that stretches into 5 municipalities or communes, much of it falling within the commune of Valbonne.

== Residential community ==
Several neighborhoods within the park area exist: Garbejaire, Haut-Sartoux, Saint-Philippe and the Place Sophie Laffitte. The locations include typical public services such as a post office, shops, hairdressers, a primary school, sport complexes, hotels, church, children play areas, etc. The area is also surrounded by multiple golf courses and located north of the science park lies the large Regional Natural Park of the Préalpes d'Azur.

== Public transport ==
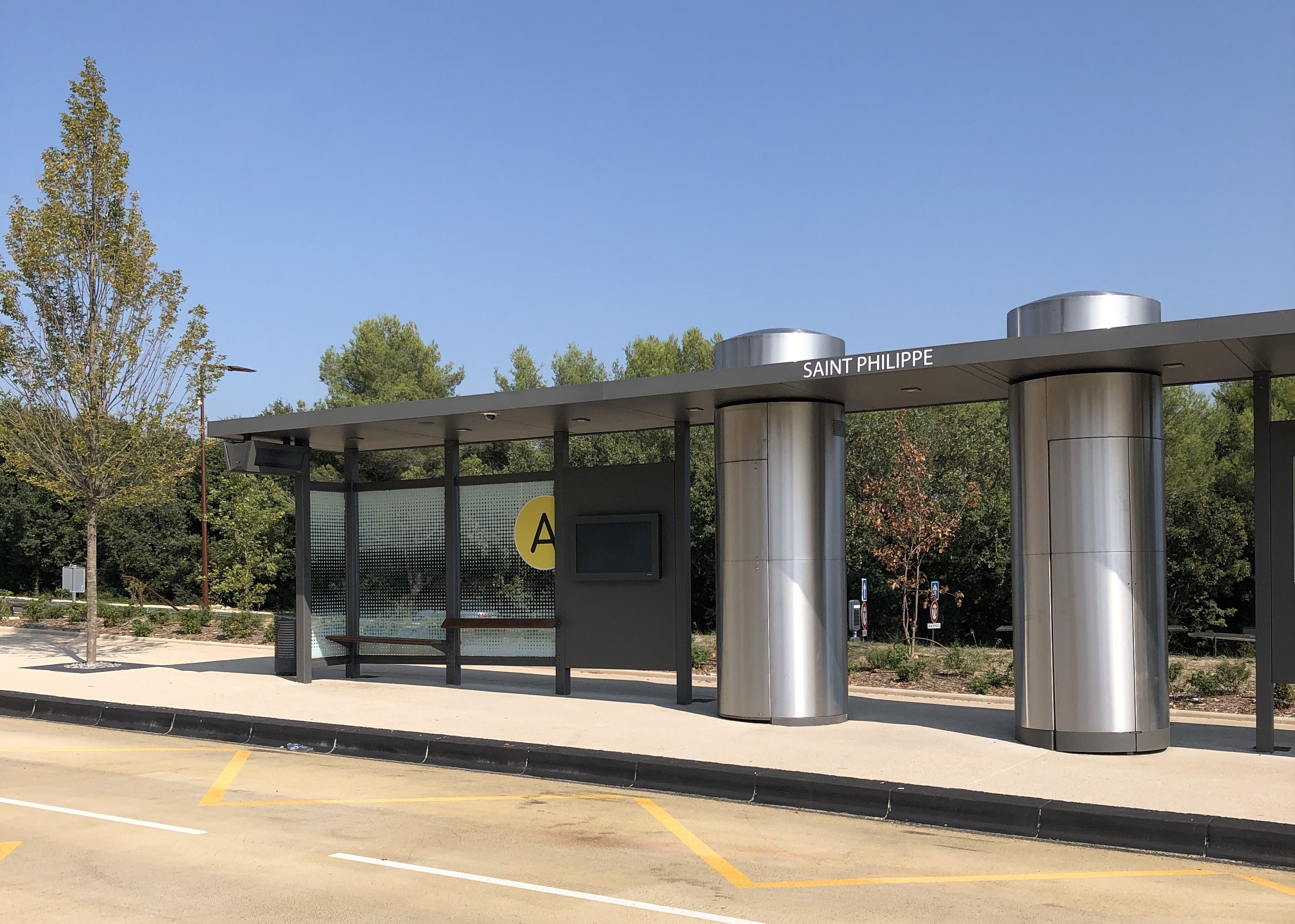
A bus stop in Sophia Antipolis.

Several bus routes (27 urban routes and 64 school bus routes) cover the vast area of the technology park. The main bus route (Ligne A, formerly known as Ligne 1), that was redesigned in 2020, connects the central bus station of the park (Gare Routière Valbonne - Sophia Antipolis) with Antibes railway station and Juan les Pins, with bus stops at main universities such as Polytech Nice Sophia and SKEMA. Antibes railway station provides access to the Riviera coastal railway (TER Provence-Alpes-Côte-d'Azur) with eastbound trains to Nice, Monaco and Ventimiglia, or westbound trains to Toulon and Marseille.

The technology park also has special express lines directly connecting the park with neighbouring cities:

- Ligne 230 (Nice - Sophia Antipolis)
- Ligne 232 (St. Laurent du Var - Sophia Antipolis)
- Ligne 530 (Grasse - Sophia Antipolis)
- Ligne 630 (Cannes - Valbonne)
- Envibus Ligne A (Antibes - Valbonne)

The nearest international airport for the general public is the Nice Côte d'Azur Airport. Passengers travelling through private jets and non-scheduled flights can use the Cannes – Mandelieu Airport as an alternative.

== Academic and research institutions ==
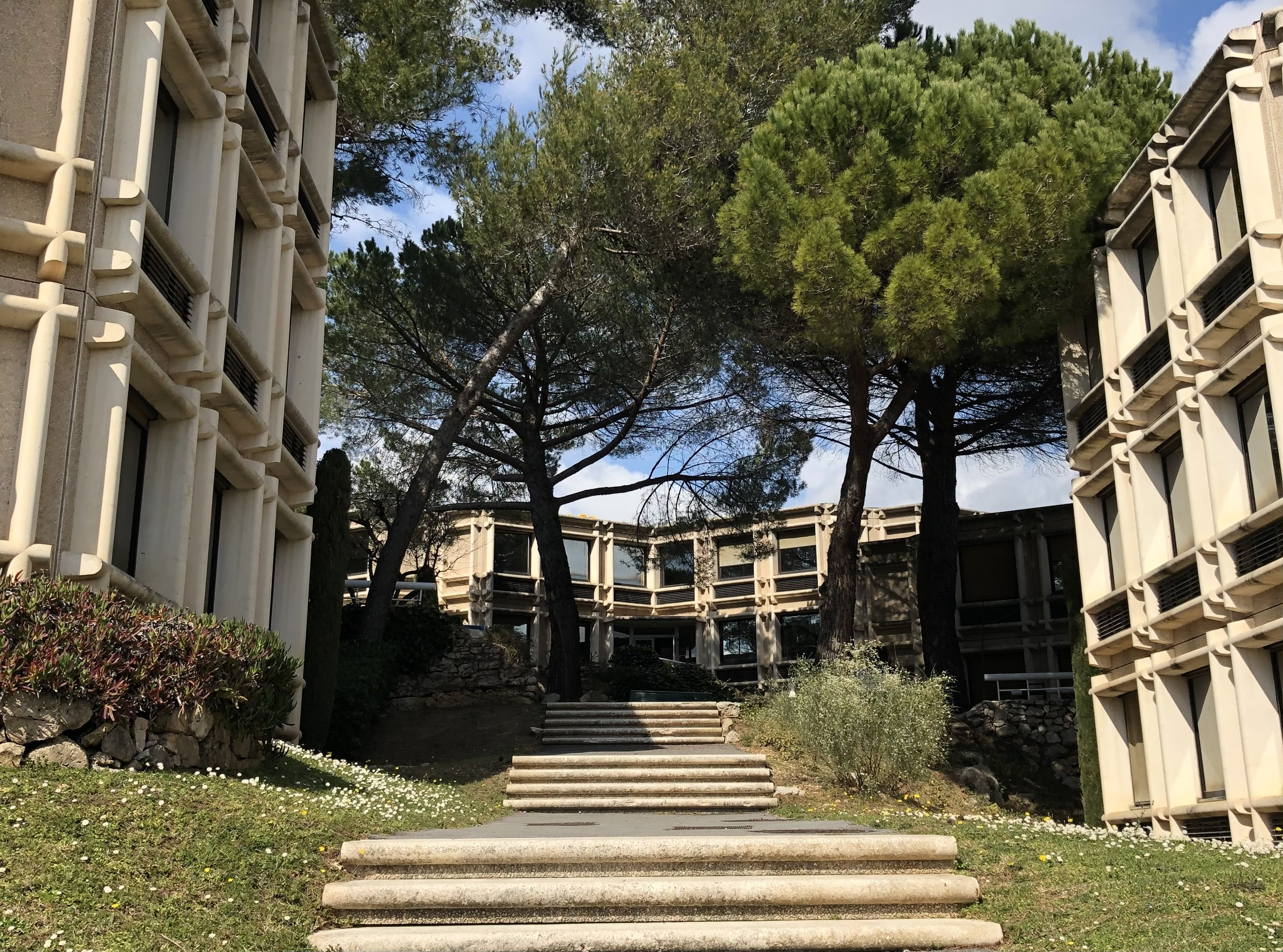
A research lab in Sophia Antipolis

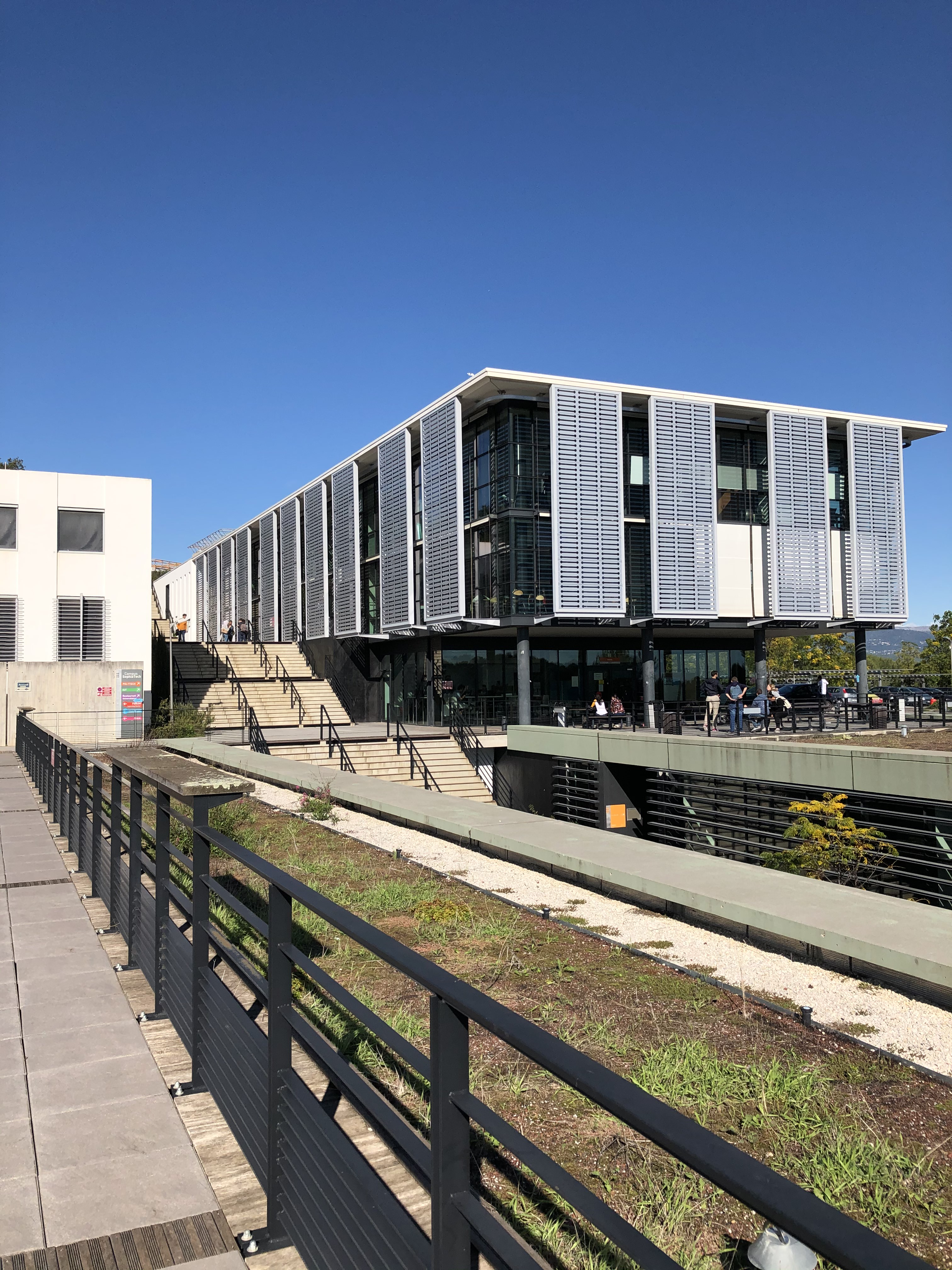
Building belonging to Polytech Nice Sophia engineering school in Sophia Antipolis

- European Research Consortium for Informatics and Mathematics (ERCIM), the European home of the World Wide Web Consortium (W3C)
- European Telecommunications Standards Institute (ETSI)
- EURECOM
- Inria Centre at Université Côte d'Azur
- Institut Interdisciplinaire d’Intelligence Artificielle
- Institut Sophia Agrobiotech - (INRAE/CNRS/UCA)
- Institut Universitaire de Technologie (IUT) Nice-Côte d'Azur - (UCA)
- Laboratoire d'Informatique, Signaux et Systèmes de Sophia Antipolis (I3S) - (CNRS/UCA)
- Mines ParisTech, École Nationale Supérieure de Mines de Paris
- Polytech Nice Sophia, polytechnic school of the University of Côte d'Azur, formerly known as University of Nice Sophia-Antipolis
- Skema Business School, School of Knowledge Economy and Management
- Université Côte d'Azur

== Companies ==
The technology park as of 2021 lists around 2,500 companies. The park also benefits from close proximity of other large corporations in the area, e. g. Thales Alenia Space (in Cannes), IBM (La Gaude) and Schneider Electric (Carros). Furthermore, the park is near the large city of Nice and its industries.

- Accenture
- Air France
- Airbus Defence & Space
- ALTEN
- Altran Praxis (software house)
- Amadeus, a travel industry IT company
- American Express Global Business Travel
- Arm Holdings
- Ashland Inc.
- Atos
- Avanade
- Broadcom
- Bosch
- Cadence Design Systems
- Capgemini
- CEVA France - Riviera Waves SAS
- CODIX
- Cisco
- Crossbeam Systems
- CSR plc
- Dailymotion
- Dassault Systèmes
- Dow
- Electrosmart
- Ethertronics
- Fortinet
- Funifier
- Galderma Laboratories
- Gemalto
- Hewlett-Packard
- HiPe Kids
- Hitachi Sophia-Antipolis laboratory
- Honeywell
- Huawei
- IBM
- Icera Semiconductor, now part of Nvidia
- Infineon
- Intel
- Lionbridge
- Luxottica
- Maxim Integrated
- Micromania Video Game Retailer
- MRL Technology
- Nicox
- NXP Semiconductors
- Orange
- Pixeet, 360 degree software and mobile hardware solutions, International Center for Advanced Communication
- Renault
- Rohm and Haas
- SAP AG, SAP Labs France
- Scaleo chip
- Sequans Communications
- Sigma Orionis SA, the oldest spin-off company of Sophia Antipolis (founded in 1984 by researchers from Mines Paristech)
- Slice Factory
- SMG Swiss Marketplace Group
- ST Ericsson
- STMicroelectronics – STNWireless JV.
- Symphony Communication
- Tetra Engineering Europe, subsidiary of Tetra Engineering Group, engineering consultancy specializing in HRSGs and power plant steam cycles
- Texas Instruments - SA site closed
- The Next Level
- Transas
- Triadss Tech Solutions
- Toyota ED2 - Toyota Europe Design Development studio
- TrackInsight - An exchange-traded funds analysis platform
- UDcast
- Valbonne Consulting
- Wall Street Systems
- Wipro-NewLogic - SA site closed, a former VLSI specialist design house with HQ in Austria
