= Philipp Aeby =

Swiss businessman

- Born: 1968 (age 57–58)
- Education: ETH Zurich: PhD, Environmental Physics 1998, MSc Climatology 1994; University of Basel: History 1991
- Occupations: RepRisk CEO, Zürich, Switzerland

Philipp Aeby (born 1968) is the chief executive officer of RepRisk, an environmental, social, and governance (ESG) data science company based in Zürich, specializing in ESG and business conduct risk research and quantitative solutions. He has served in that capacity since 2010 and is also a board member of RepRisk. He previously held the position of chief operating officer and managing partner, when RepRisk was part of the environmental and social consultancy, Ecofact.

== Professional career ==
Before joining RepRisk in 2006, Philipp worked in various managerial positions across Europe at Amgen, the global biopharmaceutical firm. He was a member of the Regional European Management Team based in Brussels where he had the responsibility of budgeting, planning, and sales and marketing effectiveness for Central and Eastern Europe, Benelux, Scandinavia, and the UK. He was also a member of the European Sales Leadership Council at Amgen.

Philipp started his professional career at the Boston Consulting Group, where he worked on a broad range of international assignments. In 1994–1995, he was a research associate at CIAT, the International Center for Tropical Agriculture in Colombia.

Philipp currently serves on the Board of Swiss Sustainable Finance, an organization that aims to promote sustainability in the Swiss financial market, and also positions Switzerland as a hub for sustainable finance. He serves on the Business Advisory Board of Swisspeace, a Swiss-based research institute focused on conflict resolution and peace-building. He was also on UNICEF's advisory board during the launch of UNICEF's Children's Rights and Business Principles

== Education ==
Philipp studied history at the University of Basel. Philipp then attended the Swiss Federal Institute of Technology (ETH) in Zurich, Switzerland, where he earned a Master's of Science in climatology (1991–1994), followed by a PhD in Environmental Physics (1995–1998). His doctoral thesis was on the topic of quantitative fluorescence imaging of tracer distributions in soil profiles. He earned the ETH Medal for outstanding research that involved applying neural networks to pattern recognition.

He has also authored or contributed to various studies and books on the top of sustainability and ESG, including a joint research study by AfU Investor Research and RepRisk on the ESG Performance of European Investment Funds, as well as a chapter in the book "CSR and Finance: the Contribution and Role of the CFO for the Sustainable Management of a Firm" ("CSR und Finance: Beitrag und Rolle des CFO für eine Nachhaltige Unternehmensführung"), entitled "New Risks: Reputation, Compliance, Climate, Water, Raw Materials, Biodiversity, Human Rights, Working Conditions, Corruption."

He is considered knowledgeable on reputational risk and ESG risk, and is often interviewed on the topic by various media.

== Personal life ==
Philipp grew up in Münchenstein outside of Basel, Switzerland. In 2005, Philipp married Dr. Maya Bundt, Head of Cyber and Digital Strategy at Swiss Re, the global reinsurance company. They live in the Zürich area and have three sons.

In 2009, he published a book entitled Kolumbianische Scheidung (Colombian Divorce), a thriller about greed and governance in the pharmaceutical industry.
