= Polytechnic High School =

Polytechnic High School, or Poly High School, is a common name given to high schools, especially high schools with a focus on technology as well as applied arts and sciences.

In the United States Polytechnic High School may refer to:

== California ==
- International Polytechnic High School, in Pomona, California
- John H. Francis Polytechnic High School, in Los Angeles, California
- Long Beach Polytechnic High School, in Long Beach, California
- Polytechnic School, a private college preparatory school in Pasadena, California
- Riverside Polytechnic High School, in Riverside, California
- San Francisco Polytechnic High School, in San Francisco, California

== Other states ==
- Polytechnic High School (Arizona), in Mesa, Arizona
- Purdue Polytechnic High Schools, in Indiana (Indianapolis, Broad Ripple, and South Bend)
- Baltimore Polytechnic Institute, in Baltimore, Maryland
- Benson Polytechnic High School, in Portland, Oregon
- Polytechnic High School (Fort Worth, Texas)
- Polytech High School in Woodside, Delaware

== See also ==
- Polytechnic (disambiguation)
- Polytechnic Secondary School
