= Polytech Orléans =

Engineering college in Orléans, France

Coordinates: 47.8425°N 1.92861°E

École Polytechnique de l'Université d'Orléans
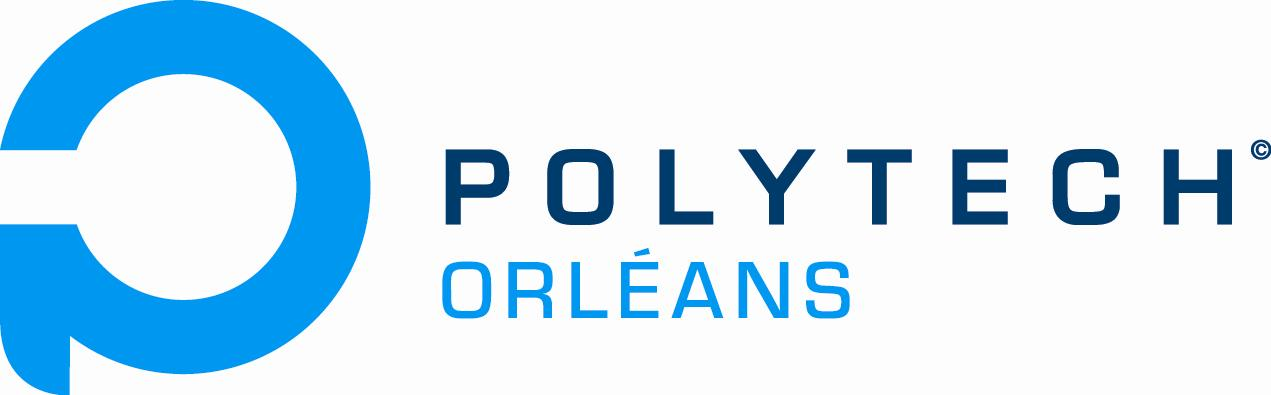
- Other name: Polytech Orléans
- Motto: Relevons les défis de demain
- Motto in English: Let's meet the challenges of tomorrow
- Type: grande école
- Established: 2002
- Academic affiliations: Polytech Group (France)
- Principal: Professor Christophe Léger
- Administrative staff: 150
- Students: 1,000
- Postgraduates: 240
- Doctoral students: 70
- Location: Orléans, France
- Colours: Blue
- Website: www.univ-orleans.fr/fr/polytech

Polytech Orléans, formerly known as École polytechnique universitaire d'Orléans is a French engineering school located in Orléans and more precisely in the district of Orléans-la-source. It is accredited by the French Commission des titres d'ingénieur (CTI) and the European Network for Accreditation of Engineering Education (EUR-ACE). Since 15 September 2009, Polytech Orléans is a member of the Conférence des Grandes Écoles.

== Presentation ==
Polytech Orléans is part of the national engineering schools Polytech, it results of the fusion of two institutes, both parts of the University of Orléans: the École Supérieure de l'Énergie et des Matériaux – ESEM (School of Engineering Materials and Energies) and the École Supérieure de Procédés Électroniques et Optiques – ESPEO (School of Electronics and Optics). Polytech'Orléans was born in 2002.

The school is located on the European campus of the University of Orléans.

== Courses ==
Polytech Orléans offers a five-year course: a preparatory course (2 years) aimed to prepare students to follow an engineering course, it is mainly based on the study of fundamental science, and an engineering course (3 years) :

- ecotechnology engineering in electronics and optics
- mechanical and energy engineering
- civil engineering / environment
- production management (dual education system)
- Home automation engineering (dual education system)

Graduate students are usually hired in the automotive industry, environment, aeronautics, embedded systems, energetics or signal processing. Graduate students are on average hired after one month.
