= EUR-ACE label =

Certificate of quality for European engineering degrees

The EUR-ACE (European Accredited Engineer) Label is a certificate of quality awarded to degree programmes in Engineering.

The EUR-ACE label is awarded after authorization from the European Network for Accreditation of Engineering Education (ENAEE). ENAEE grants this authorization to agencies that accredit degree programmes in Engineering in accordance with the European Qualifications Framework (EQF) standards and with ENAEE standards.

== Agencies authorised to award the EUR-ACE label ==
As of January 2019, the agencies authorised to award the EUR-ACE label are as follows:

- United States - ABET
- South Korea - ABEEK
- Finland – FINEEC – Kansallinen Koulutuksen Arviointikeskus Karv
- France – CTI Commission des titres d'ingénieur
- Germany – ASIIN – Fachakkreditierungsagentur für Studiengänge der Ingenieurwissenschaften, der Informatik, der Naturwissenschaften, und der Mathematik
- Ireland – Engineers Ireland
- Italy – Quacing – Agenzia per la Certificazione di Qualità e l’Accreditamento EUR-ACE dei Corsi di Studio in Ingegneria
- Kazakhstan – KazSEE – Kazakhstan Society for Engineering Education
- Poland – KAUT – Accreditation Commission of Universities of Technology
- Portugal – OE Ordem dos Engenheiros
- Romania – ARACIS – The Romanian Agency for Quality Assurance in Higher Education
- Russia – AEER – Association for Engineering Education of Russia
- Slovakia – ZSVTS – Association of Slovak Scientific and Technological Societies
- Spain – ANECA/ IIE – National Agency for Quality Assessment and Accreditation of Spain, with Instituto de la Ingeniería de España
- Switzerland – AAQ – Agence Suisse d'Accréditation et d'Assurance Qualité
- Turkey – MÜDEK – Association for Evaluation and Accreditation of Engineering Programmes
- United Kingdom – Engineering Council

== EUR-ACE labelled programmes ==
As of January 2019, the EUR-ACE label has been awarded to about 3,000 engineering degree programmes in 35 countries both within and outside of Europe.
