= Finnish Education Evaluation Centre =

Independent government agency

Finnish Education Evaluation Centre (FINEEC)
- Company type: Evaluation of education
- Founded: 2014/05/01 in Helsinki, Finland
- Headquarters: Helsinki
- Number of employees: 50
- Website: karvi.fi/en/

The Finnish Education Evaluation Centre (FINEEC) is an independent government agency that evaluates education in Finland and the work of Finnish education providers from early childhood education to higher education. It also produces information for education policy decision-making and the development of education. FINEEC carries out audits of quality systems, evaluations of learning outcomes (in basic education and upper secondary education), and thematic and system evaluations. FINEEC also supports education providers and higher education institutions in matters pertaining to evaluation and quality management and also works to develop the evaluation of education. The tasks and organisation of FINEEC are specified in legislation.

== History ==
FINEEC began operating in May 2014 when the evaluation activities of the Finnish Higher Education Evaluation Council, the Finnish Education Evaluation Council and the Finnish National Board of Education were combined.

It has been proposed that the Matriculation Examination Board and FINEEC should be incorporated into the new Finnish National Agency for Education in 2018. The two would nevertheless continue to operate as independent bodies.

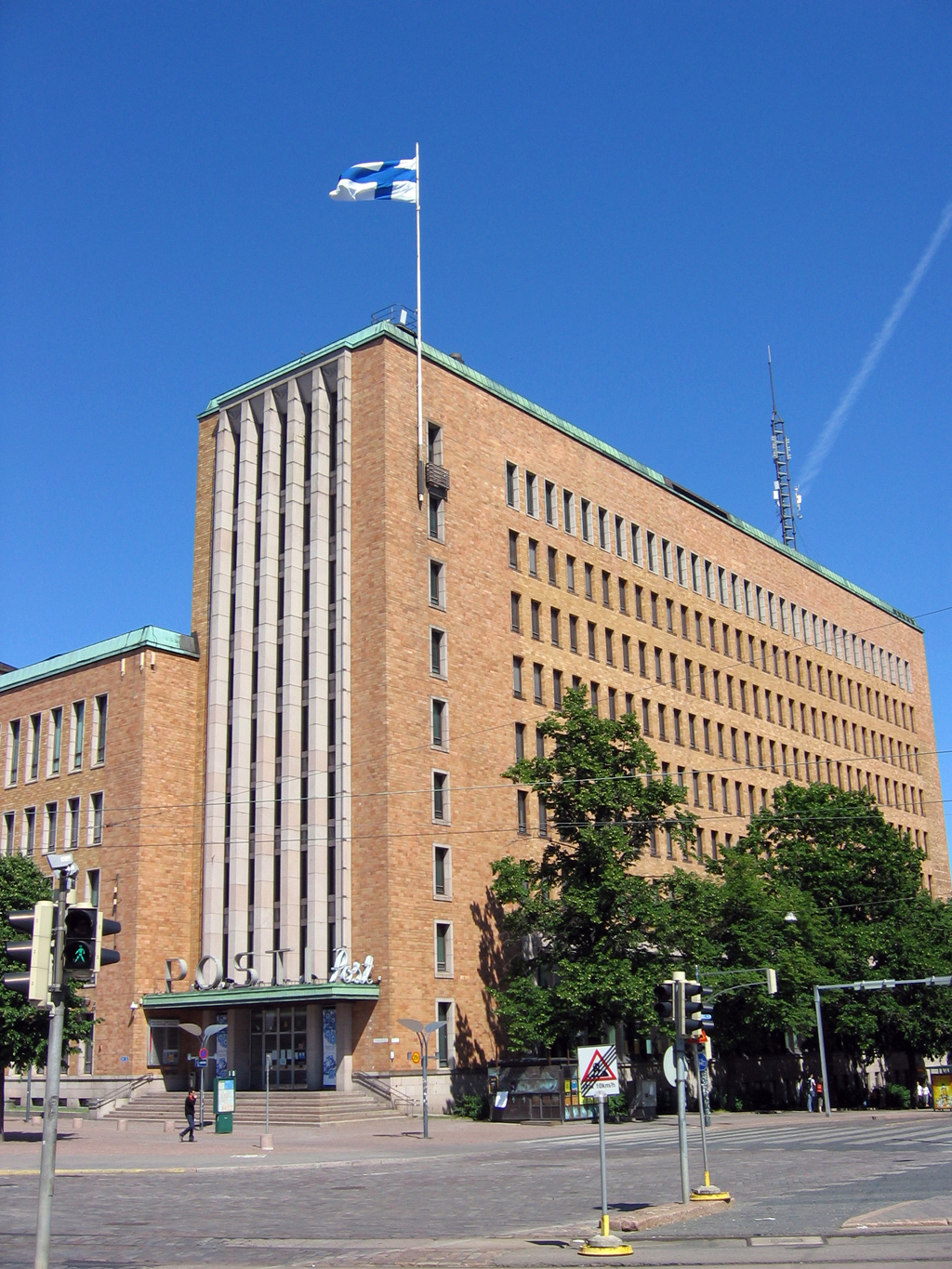
The main office of FINEEC is located in the Postitalo in Helsinki.

== Organisation ==
FINEEC comprises the Evaluation Council, the Higher Education Evaluation Committee and three competence units: the General Education and Early Childhood Education Unit, the Vocational Education Unit, and the Higher Education and Liberal Adult Education Unit. FINEEC has a staff of about 50, with offices in Helsinki and Jyväskylä.

- The Evaluation Council monitors and develops FINEEC's work and prepares the strategic guidelines for the agency. The Finnish government appoints the members of the Evaluation Council for four years at a time. The Evaluation Council submits a proposal for an evaluation plan to the Ministry of Education and Culture.
- The Higher Education Evaluation Committee decides on the project plans for evaluations of higher education institutions, planning and evaluation teams, as well as on the outcomes of the quality system audits. FINEEC may also appoint committees and other divisions.

== Evaluations ==
FINEEC implements system and thematic evaluations, learning outcome evaluations and field-specific evaluations.

Examples of evaluations carried out by FINEEC at different educational levels:

- Basic education
  - The evaluation of learning outcomes in mother tongue and literature showed that in the ninth grade, girls produce better summer job applications than boys.
  - Of the pupils in the ninth grade studying Finnish as second language, a total of 87 per cent achieved a good competence level, whereas 13 per cent of the pupils only mastered the basics of Finnish.
  - There are differences in the evaluations of mathematics competence of ninth-grade pupils: In some schools, pupils faring equally well in the evaluations received different grades, and the gaps could be as much as two whole grades.
  - Girls fare significantly better than boys in home economics, in both knowledge and skills.
- General upper secondary education
  - There are major differences between general upper secondary schools in the way in which mathematics skills are graded: In a school with high requirement levels, a student receiving a grade of 5 may possess the same skills as a student receiving a grade of 9 in another school.
- Vocational education
  - Individuals possessing the Vocational Qualification in Business Information Technology are doing extremely well in information and communication technology competence tests. However, their job prospects are not as good as before because more specialised skills are now required.
  - Finland produces highly competent textile industry professionals, but the employment situation in the sector is weak.
  - Most of the providers of vocational education have a properly functioning quality management system.

FINEEC is responsible for evaluating education provided by universities and universities of applied sciences in Finland. Its core activities include audits of higher education institutions’ quality systems, thematic evaluations of the education system, and accreditation of engineering degree programmes. Higher education institutions passing the audits carried out by FINEEC receive a quality label, which shows that the quality system used in the organisation in question is in accordance with European principles and recommendations, and that it also meets the national criteria for quality management in higher education institutions. The quality label is valid for six years.
