= Kepler Cheuvreux =

European financial services company

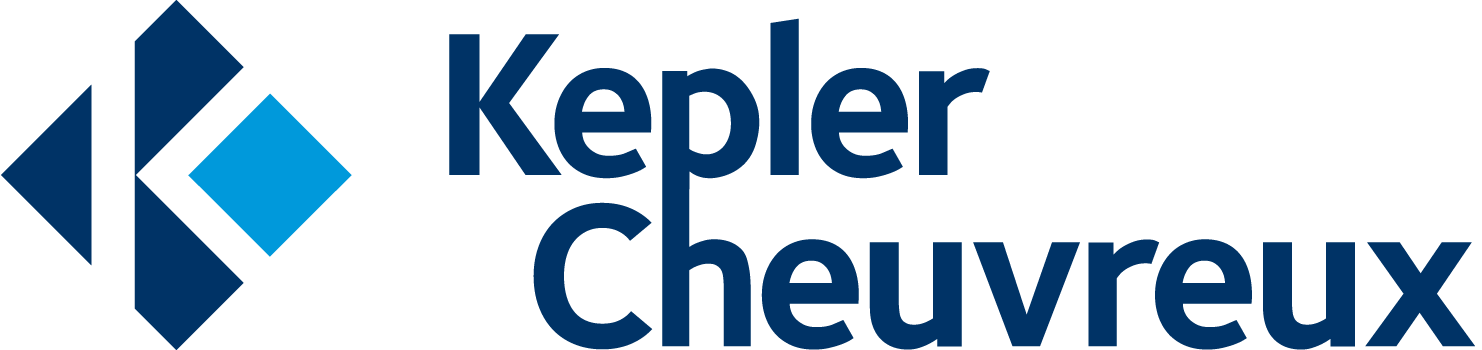
- Industry: Financial services
- Founded: 1997
- Headquarters: 116, Avenue Kleber, 75016 Paris, France
- Number of locations: 12
- Key people: Laurent Quirin, Grégoire Varenne
- Products: Research, Execution, Advisory, Asset Management
- Number of employees: 600
- Website: www.keplercheuvreux.com

Kepler Cheuvreux is an independent European financial services company providing research, execution, advisory, and asset management services.

== History ==
=== 1997: origins ===
Kepler Capital Markets was founded in 1997 under the name Julius Baer Brokerage (JBB), a wholly owned subsidiary of Swiss banking group Julius Baer Holding. In 2003, Julius Baer Holding sold JBB to Lightyear Fund, a US private equity firm. JBB then changed its name to Kepler Equities, which Icelandic bank Landsbanki acquired two years later in 2005 to develop a diversified financial services company, including equity, bond, and derivative brokerage, corporate finance, debt and credit investment, and investment services.

=== 2008: MBO and independence ===
Following Landsbanki's bankruptcy in 2008, Kepler Landsbanki was bought out by its employees through an MBO (management buyout) and changed its name to Kepler Capital Markets (KCM). It became independent and focused solely on brokerage activities.

=== 2011: Equity investment by new institutional shareholders ===
In 2011, the investment firm BlackFin Capital Partners acquired 47% of KCM's capital, bringing together four institutional shareholders: Caisse des Dépôts, Crédit Mutuel Arkéa, and Banca Leonardo, whose brokerage and research unit was acquired by KCM.

=== 2011 – 2018: Reshaping of the group and formation of strategic alliances in international markets ===
The decade was marked by the formation of strategic partnerships, starting in 2011 with an alliance between KCM and UniCredit in equity brokerage and equity capital markets, at first in Western Europe and then in Central and Eastern Europe starting in 2012. UniCredit acquired a stake in KCM in 2013.

Two years later, in April 2013, KCM acquired Cheuvreux from Crédit Agricole CIB and re-branded to Kepler Cheuvreux. In December 2013, Kepler Cheuvreux acquired the activities of Derivatives Capital, a French company specializing in structured products for independent financial advisors and private banks, to create a new independent platform in this market.

In the period 2015 – 2018 Kepler Cheuvreux established strategic ECM & research distribution partnerships with Rabobank for the Netherlands, Swedbank for the Nordics and Belfius for Belgium. In the same period, the company signed research distribution agreements with CIMB (Asia), Piper Jaffray (US) and CIBC (Canada). Rabobank, Swedbank, and Belfius also acquired stakes in Kepler Cheuvreux.

=== 2018: Two new major equity shareholders ===
Atlas Merchant Capital and Edmond de Rothschild Equity Strategies (ERES) bought out the stake held by BlackFin Capital Partners, giving them an interest in Kepler Cheuvreux in June 2018 of 20% and 7.7%, respectively. However, 40% of Kepler Cheuvreux's voting rights continue to be controlled by its management and employees.

=== 2024: Acquisition of Trackinsight ===
In September 2024, Kepler Cheuvreux acquired a majority stake in Trackinsight, becoming the company's principal shareholder.

== Activities ==
=== Research ===
Kepler Cheuvreux's research activity, which includes analyzing financial securities such as equities and bonds, employs more than 120 analysts and covers more than 1,000 companies in Europe.

In June 2015, the company signed a partnership with the Asian investment bank CIMB for reciprocal distribution of their research in their respective markets. Since February 2017, Kepler Cheuvreux has been distributing in Europe the equity research of Piper Jaffray, a US investment bank. In September 2018, the French financial services group exported its research to Canada with a partnership with CIBC.

=== Execution ===
Kepler Cheuvreux's Execution activity processes buy and sell orders in financial securities such as equities, bonds, derivatives, warrants, ETFs and convertible bonds. Using an in-house trading platform acquired in 2013, this activity consists of 12 execution offices, 77 experts, and membership of 103 major global markets.

=== Advisory ===
Kepler Cheuvreux provides advisory services in investment banking and equity capital markets in conjunction with its banking partners (CACIB, UniCredit, Rabobank, Swedbank, and Belfius), investment services (creation of structured products), debt services (offering liquidity in the primary and secondary bond markets), and specific services to private banks and retail banking networks.

== Organization ==
=== Shareholders ===
Atlas Merchant Capital and Eres (Edmond de Rothschild Equity Strategies) acquired a stake in Kepler Cheuvreux in June 2018. As an independent company, Kepler Cheuvreux's share ownership was as follows in 2018: Management and employees (25.5%), Atlas Merchant Capital (20.0%), Crédit Agricole CIB (15.1%), UniCredit (10.3%), Eres (7.7%), Swedbank (6%), Caisse Des Dépôts (5.2%), Belfius (5.2%), and Rabobank (5%).

=== Governance ===
Kepler Cheuvreux is a limited company governed by an Executive Board and a Supervisory Board. The supervisory board and the executive board are chaired by Laurent Quirin and Grégoire Varenne, respectively.

In February 2026, the company reports €12 billion in assets.
