= Polytechnic (disambiguation) =

A polytechnic is an educational institution that primarily focuses on vocational education, applied sciences, and career pathways.

Polytechnic may also refer to:

== Education systems ==
- Polytechnic High School (disambiguation), lists a number of high schools with polytechnic included in the name
- Polytechnic Secondary School
- Polytechnic (Finland), a type of institute of higher education, now known as the University of Applied Sciences
- Polytechnic (Greece), schools that teach engineering
- Polytechnic (Portugal), schools that offer profession-oriented, practical training
- Polytechnic (Singapore), tertiary institutions offering education in applied sciences and vocational fields
- Polytechnic (United Kingdom), system 1965–1992; since merging with university system known as "post-1992 universities"

== Tertiary educational institutions ==
=== Asia ===
- Bahrain Polytechnic in Isa Town, Bahrain
- Hong Kong Polytechnic University (known as PolyU)
- Jakarta State Polytechnic, Indonesia
- Macao Polytechnic University
- Politeknik Ungku Omar in Perak, Malaysia
- Polytechnic University of the Philippines in Manila
- Nanyang Polytechnic in Singapore
- Ngee Ann Polytechnic in Singapore
- Republic Polytechnic in Singapore
- Singapore Polytechnic in Singapore
- Temasek Polytechnic in Singapore
- Tehran Polytechnic in Tehran, Iran
- Tokyo Polytechnic University, Japan
- Wuhan Polytechnic University, Hubei, China

=== Canada ===
- Algonquin College of Applied Arts and Technology, Ottawa, Ontario
- Kwantlen Polytechnic University, Surrey, British Columbia
- British Columbia Institute of Technology, Vancouver, British Columbia
- Lethbridge Polytechnic, Lethbridge, Alberta
- Northwestern Polytechnic, Grand Prairie, Alberta
- Red Deer Polytechnic, Red Deer, Alberta
- Northern Alberta Institute of Technology, Edmonton, Alberta
- Polytechnique Montréal, Montréal, QC
- Red River College Polytechnic, Winnipeg, Manitoba
- Seneca Polytechnic, Toronto, Ontario
- Humber Polytechnic, Etobicoke, Ontario

=== Europe ===
- Polytechnic University of Catalonia or BarcelonaTech, Spain
- Peter the Great St. Petersburg Polytechnic University, Russian Federation, St. Petersburg
- Polytechnic University of Hauts-de-France, Valenciennes
- Polytechnic University of Milan (Politecnico di Milano), Milan
- Polytechnic University of Paris, Paris
- Polytechnic University of Turin (Politecnico di Torino), Turin
- Politechnika Wrocławska, another name for Wrocław University of Science and Technology in Wrocław, Poland

=== New Zealand ===
- Aoraki Polytechnic
- Christchurch Polytechnic Institute of Technology
- Otago Polytechnic

=== United States ===
- California Polytechnic State University, San Luis Obispo
- California State Polytechnic University, Humboldt
- California State Polytechnic University, Pomona
- Florida Polytechnic University of Lakeland, Florida
- Georgia Institute of Technology (Georgia Tech), Atlanta, Georgia
- Michigan Technological University, Houghton, Michigan
- New Jersey Institute of Technology, Newark, New Jersey
- Polytechnic University (New York), New York University Tandon School of Engineering
- Rensselaer Polytechnic Institute, Troy, New York
- Virginia Polytechnic Institute and State University (Virginia Tech) of Blacksburg, Virginia
- University of Wisconsin–Stout Polytechnic, Menomonie, Wisconsin
- Worcester Polytechnic Institute, Worcester, Massachusetts
- Utah Tech University, St. George, Utah

== Entertainment ==
- Polytechnique (film), a 2009 Canadian film
- Polytechnic (film), a 2014 Indian film
- Polytechnic (band), an English indie rock band

== Sports ==
- Polytechnic Boxing Club, an English boxing club
- Kingston Athletic Club and Polytechnic Harriers, English sporting clubs
- Polytechnic Marathon, an English foot race
- Polytechnic Stadium (London), an English sports facility
- Polytechnic Magazine, magazine covering news for the Regent Street Polytechnic
- Polytechnic Stadium (Kremenchuk), a Ukrainian sports facility

== See also ==
- Cal Poly (disambiguation), lists several polytechnics in California referred to by this name
- VEB Polytechnik, a defunct East German (GDR) company
- List of institutions using the term "institute of technology" or "polytechnic"
- ;; or
