= Electrosmart =

Android phone app for measuring radio wave pollution

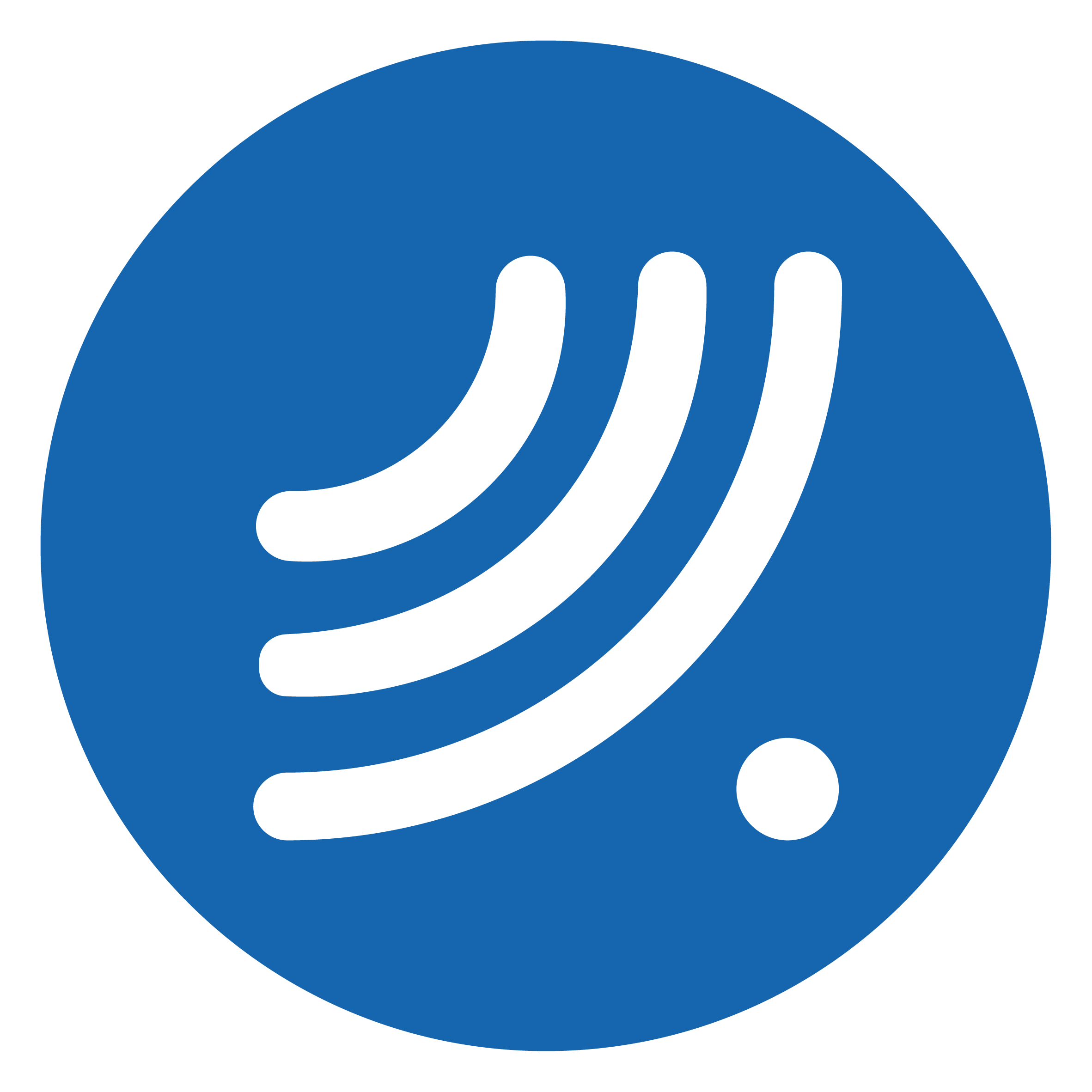
- Developer(s): Electrosmart
- Initial release: August 23, 2016; 8 years ago
- Stable release: 1.24 (Android)
- Operating system: Android 4.1 or later
- Available in: English, French, Spanish, German, Italian, Portuguese
- Type: Health & Lifestyle
- Website: electrosmart.app

Electrosmart is an Android application which measures the radio-frequency electromagnetic waves emitting from various sources like mobile phones (cellular networks i.e., 2G, 3G, 4G, 5G), WiFi access points, Bluetooth devices, etc. The app uses the antenna of mobile phones to calculate the pollution of waves and order them according to the power of that particular source. The app also provides recommendations to moderate the exposure. The data collected is administered in France and maintained by Inria Ethics Committee.

== History ==
Arnaud Legout, a research scientist in INRIA at French Institute for Research in Computer Science and Automation launched the Free EMF Detector, EMF Meter - ElectroSmart app on August 23, 2016 to the android users via Google Play. The app was developed by a research team DIANA (Design, Implementation and Analysis of Networking Architectures) led by Arnaud Legout in partnership with Electronics, Antennas and Telecommunications Laboratory (CNRS and Sophia Antipolis University). The team researched for 2 years before launching the final product into the market. According to IARC (International Agency for Research on Cancer) and WHO (World Health Organization), the electromagnetic fields generated by mobile phones may be carcinogenic to humans.

== Features ==
The app measures and records the data after every five seconds and execute in order to provide real time measurement on a scale of 0 to 100. The exposure index from 0 to 42 is considered to be 'Low' and an ideal exposure for electrosensitive people to sleep and take rest, index from 42 to 70 is considered to be 'Moderate' and denotes well connectivity to RF radiation emitting devices but not an over-exposure, and index from 70 to 100 is known to be 'High' and recommends action to be taken in order to moderate the exposure. It also captures the geolocation of the phone and its orientation in the space. The app keeps the data record of the exposure to which user was exposed during past days and provides an option to view summary in 'Statistics' section of the app. The app alerts its users in case of high exposure and provides them solutions to create insulation from electromagnetic sources.

== User statistics ==
In first 6 months, app gained more than 2,000 downloads. By June 2018, app became more popular among the audience and received more than 64,000 downloads and 30,000 active users in addition to 850 million measurements. At present, app is downloaded more than 1,000,000 times in 150 countries and established a rating of 4.5 out of 5 on Google Play.

== Current executives ==
- Arnaud Legout, Co-founder and CEO
- David Migliacci, Co-founder and CMO
