= University of Science and Technology of Mazandaran =

Coordinates: 36.7387387°N 53.541021°E

University of Science and Technology of Mazandaran - (MAZUST)
- دانشگاه علم و فناوری مازندران
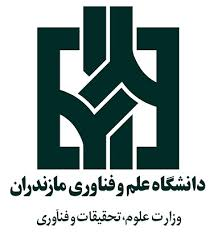
- Type: Public
- Established: 1994
- President: Ahmadreza Rabbani
- Faculty: 84
- Students: 3400
- Undergraduates: yes
- Postgraduates: yes
- Doctoral students: yes
- Location: Mazandaran, Behshahr, University Boulevard, Sea Road, Behshahr, Māzandarān, 4851878195, Iran
- Campus: 3
- Nickname: MAZUST
- Website: https://en.mazust.ac.ir/

The University of Science and Technology of Mazandaran is a public university under the Ministry of Science located in east Mazandaran province in Iran. The university offers undergraduate and postgraduate degrees in areas such as mathematics, electrical engineering, chemical engineering, civil engineering and industrial engineering.

== History ==
The university was established in 1994 as a branch campus affiliated with the Iran University of Science and Technology. It later became an independent institution under Iran’s Ministry of Science, Research and Technology.

The university was renamed the Higher Education Center in 2007 following its departure from the larger University of Science and Technology of Iran and the Mazandaran University of Science and Technology.

== See also ==
- Higher education in Iran
- Air tour
- University map
