= European Network for Accreditation of Engineering Education =

- Founded: 2006
- Type: aisbl (Belgian law)
- Purpose: Quality assurance of engineering higher education
- Location: Brussels, Belgium
- Region served: Europe and worldwide
- Products: EUR-ACE label
- Key people: Damien Owens, president (2019–...)
- Website: enaee.eu

The European Network for Accreditation of Engineering Education (ENAEE) was established in 2006 as an organization to promote quality in engineering education across Europe and beyond. It is rooted in the Bologna process which aims to build the European Higher Education Area.
Membership of ENAEE is open to all bodies concerned with educational and professional standards in engineering. Such bodies may include accreditation and quality assurance agencies, professional organisations, associations of higher education institutions, employers' associations, and engineering student bodies and their associations.

== Mission and activities ==
ENAEE is a not-for-profit organisation whose mission is to serve the public and society through the promotion and advancement of engineering education in Europe and abroad. ENAEE aims at building a pan-European framework for the accreditation of engineering education programmes, to enhance the quality of engineering graduates, to facilitate the mobility of professional engineers and to promote quality and innovation in engineering education.
To achieve these goals, ENAEE has established and regularly updates the EUR-ACE label Framework Standards and Guidelines (EAFSG) as a set of quality standards for the outcomes of the engineering degree programmes, the training institutions and the accreditation agencies. EAFSG's are intended to be applied to all branches of engineering and to qualify graduates to enter the engineering profession and to have their qualifications recognised throughout the area.
ENAEE has established the EUR-ACE label for engineering degree programmes which fulfil the EAFSG standards requirements for student workload, programme outcomes and programme management; as of mid-2019, more than 2 000 EUR-ACE labels have been awarded at Bachelor and Master Level within the European Higher Education Area and beyond>.
ENAEE does not accredit directly engineering degree programmes; after evaluation of their policies and procedures, it authorizes accreditation and quality assurance agencies to award the EUR-ACE label to the engineering degree programmes which these agencies accredit. As of mid-2019, 15 agencies are authorized by ENAEE. They signed a Mutual Recognition Agreement, known as the EUR-ACE Accord, whereby they accept each other's accreditation decisions in respect of bachelor's and master's degree programmes.
As of end 2018, more than 2 000 EUR-ACE labels were awarded to engineering degree programmes in 300 universities and other higher education institutions, in countries both within and outside of Europe.

== EUR-ACE framework standards and guidelines ==
In 2006, ENAEE set the standards (ESG) which assure the quality of engineering degree programmes in both Europe and internationally; to accommodate the different historic traditions of engineering teaching within different countries, the framework does not focus on the study programme contents, but specifies the outcomes of the accredited programmes.
In line with the level 6 and 7 of the European Qualifications Framework, the outcomes describe the knowledge, understanding, skills and abilities, which an accredited engineering degree programme must enable a graduate to demonstrate. In the ENAEE framework, they are grouped under six headings:

- Knowledge and understanding
- Engineering analysis
- Engineering design
- Investigations
- Engineering practice
- Transferable skills

In 2014, a major revision of the framework was undertaken to reflect the experience gained from the beginning and was published in 2015.

== Organization of ENAEE ==
ENAEE is an International Association, registered in Belgium as an association without lucrative purpose. ENAEE members are organisations concerned with engineering education and/or profession, and in particular with accreditation. There are two membership categories: full members and associate members. As of January 2022, ENAEE has 19 full members and 8 associate members.
Beside the bodies (General Assembly, Administrative Council) common to all not-for-profit associations, ENAEE has a Label Committee (LC), composed of one representative of each accreditation agency. The LC makes recommendations to the Administrative Council in relation to the granting of the EUR-ACE labels to engineering education programmes.

=== Presidents of ENAEE ===
- Giuliano Augusti, Italy (founding president 2006 – 2012)
- Iring Wasser, Germany (2012–2014)
- Bernard Remaud, France (2014–2018)
- Damien Owens, Ireland (2019–2022)
- José Carlos Quadrado, Portugal (2023-...)

=== ENAEE full members (2022) ===
1. AAQ – Swiss Agency of Accreditation and Quality Assurance
2. Acredita CI – Agencia Acreditadora Colegio de Ingenieros de Chile
3. AEER – Association for Engineering Education of Russia
4. ANECA – National Agency for Quality Assessment and Accreditation of Spain
5. ARACIS – The Romanian Agency for Quality Assurance in Higher Education
6. ASIIN – Fachakkreditierungsagentur für Studiengänge der Ingenieurwissenschaften, der Informatik, der Naturwissenschaften und der Mathematik e.V. – Germany
7. CTI – Commission des Titres d'Ingénieur – France
8. EC – Engineering Council – Great Britain
9. EI – Engineers Ireland
10. FINEEC – Kansallinen Koulutuksen Arviointikeskus Karvi – Finland
11. ICACIT – Instituto de Calidad y Acreditación de Programas de Computación, Ingeniería y Tecnología en ingeniería - Perú.
12. IIE – Instituto de la Ingeniería de España
13. JEA – Jordan Engineers Association
14. KAUT – Accreditation Commission of Universities of Technology – Poland
15. KazSEE – Kazakhstan Society for Engineering Education
16. Müdek – Association for Evaluation and Accreditation of Engineering Programs – Turkey
17. OE – Ordem dos Engenheiros – Portugal
18. Quacing – Agenzia per la Certificazione di Qualità e l'Accreditamento EUR-ACE dei Corsi di Studio in Ingegneria- Italy
19. ZSVTS – Association of Slovak Scientific and Technological Societies
20. US - ABET
21. South Korea - ABEEK

== History of ENAEE ==
The European Standing Observatory for the Engineering Profession and Education (ESOEPE) was established in September 2000. Its aim was to improve systems of accreditation of engineering degree programmes in Europe. In 2004, ESOEPE submitted a proposal to the European Commission. This proposal envisaged the establishment of a quality label (the EUR-ACE Label) which could be awarded to engineering degree programmes which had reached certain educational standards, as defined by their learning outcomes. The proposal was accepted by the European Commission and funding provided for the project.
The EUR-ACE label was listed among the six EC-sponsored "European quality labels in higher education". With the support of the European Commission, ENAEE developed projects to disseminate the EUR-ACE system respectively: in the European Union; PRO-EAST in Russia; QUEECA in Central Asia; MEDACCR in South Mediterranean countries.
