= Thermokinetics =

Thermokinetics deals with the study of thermal decomposition kinetics.

== See also ==
- Thermogravimetry
- Differential thermal analysis
- Differential scanning calorimetry
