= Dodger blue =

Color shade of blue

Dodger Blue

Color coordinates
- Hex triplet: #1E90FF
- sRGB^{B} (r, g, b): (30, 144, 255)
- HSV (h, s, v): (210°, 88%, 100%)
- CIELCh_{uv} (L, C, h): (59, 107, 252°)
- Source: X11
- ISCC–NBS descriptor: Vivid blue
- B: Normalized to [0–255] (byte)

Dodger blue is a rich bright tone of the color azure named for its use in the uniform of the Los Angeles Dodgers. It is also a web color used in the design of web pages. The web color is not used in the Dodgers' uniform but it rather resembles the lighter blue used throughout Dodger Stadium.

== History ==
The Dodgers were never referred to as wearing Dodger Blue during their time in Brooklyn, although some now refer to them as representing "True Dodger Blue". The concept originated by Tommy Lasorda who popularized it with his saying "Cut me and I'll bleed Dodger blue." Lasorda managed the franchise in Los Angeles for 20 years from 1977 to 1996, and was on the player roster of the Brooklyn Dodgers, though he played for them only very briefly.

In 1989, the team's famous Dodger blue was added to a color database. Paul Raveling, a software engineer who in 1989 was working at the Information Sciences Institute at USC, had been "tuning" colors to be properly displayed on computer monitors. He proposed a major update to the list of color names that were supported by the X11 user interface system, including one called "dodgerblue". Eventually, that list of colors would be incorporated into web browsers, which allow programmers writing HTML or CSS to type a color name instead of a code.

=== Uniform color ===
Dodger Blue (uniform)

Color coordinates
- Hex triplet: #005A9C
- sRGB^{B} (r, g, b): (0, 90, 156)
- HSV (h, s, v): (205°, 100%, 61%)
- CIELCh_{uv} (L, C, h): (37, 64, 250°)
- Source: MLBStatic.com
- ISCC–NBS descriptor: Strong blue
- B: Normalized to [0–255] (byte)

The actual blue that the Dodgers currently wear is RGB-hex #005A9C. It is a shade of royal blue. Regarding the web color's RGB values, Paul Raveling notes that "The color tuning was done on HP monitors and the colors turned out very good then. The catch is that since then, monitors seemed to have standardized on different gamma corrections." The current standard RGB color space was defined in 1996, seven years after "dodgerblue".

== See also ==
- Lists of colors
