= Commission des Titres d'Ingénieur =

Coordinates: 48.8450879°N 2.3018345°E

Commission des titres d'ingénieur
- Commission des titres d'ingénieur Accreditation authority for French professional engineers
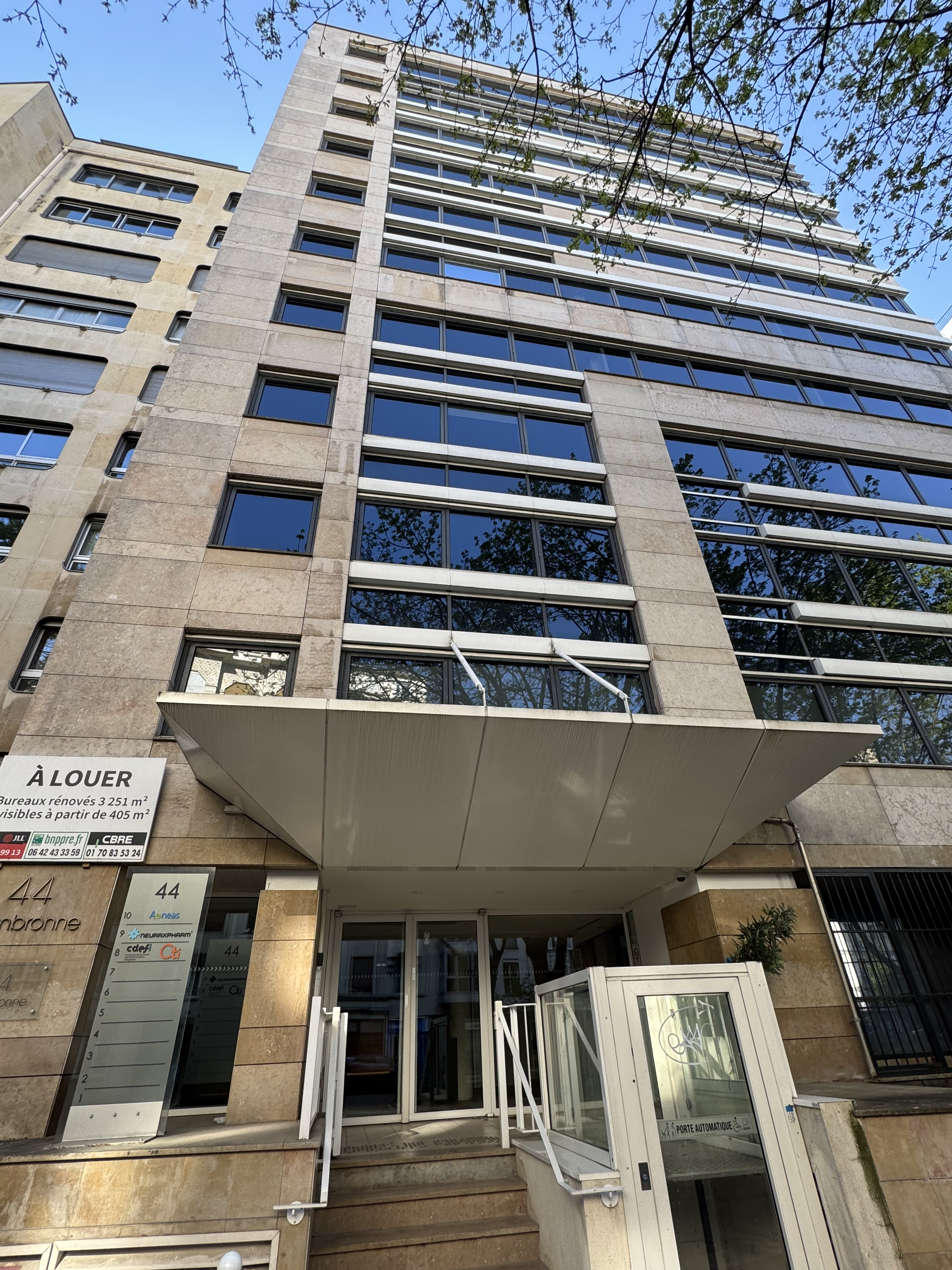
- Nickname: CTI
- Formation: 10 July 1934
- Type: Accreditation agency
- Purpose: Quality Assurance of higher engineering education
- Headquarters: 44 rue de Cambronne, 75 015 Paris (France)
- Services: Quality assessment, accreditation
- Members: 32 representatives of engineering graduate schools, employers and engineers associations.
- Leader: Claire Peyratout (2024-...)
- Website: https://www.cti-commission.fr/

The Commission des Titres d'Ingénieur (French pronunciation: [kɔmisjɔ̃ de titʁ dɛ̃ʒenjœʁ]; in English: Accreditation authority for French professional engineers, abbreviated in French as "CTI") is the main committee responsible for evaluation and accreditation of higher education institutions for the training of professional engineers in France. It regulates the issuance of the Diplôme d'ingénieur and use of the academic title of "Ingénieur Diplomé" (qualified graduate engineer).

Established by law on 10 July 1934, CTI does not exist as an independent administrative authority, but is nonetheless an autonomous structure within the Ministry of Higher Education and Research. In France, CTI is the relevant body in charge of carrying out evaluation procedures that lead to the accreditation of the institutions to award the engineering degree "titre d’ingénieur diplômé".

CTI is a member of the European Association for Quality Assurance in Higher Education and it is entered in EQAR, the European Higher Education Quality Register, which authorizes operation throughout the European Higher Education Area.

== Missions ==
The various missions of the CTI have evolved over the years, and currently include:

- Periodic assessment of all engineering programmes offered by French higher education institutions across the country, that leads to the accreditation of the institutions to award the engineering degree.
- Accreditation for graduate schools of engineering ("Grande école"); CTI issues decisions for private institutions and recommendations to the relevant ministries for public institutions (recommendations which are systematically transformed into decisions). It is in charge of developing the accreditation criteria and procedures; CTI thus contributes to the continuous development of engineering training and its adaptation to the needs of businesses and society in general .
- The evaluation of training courses for engineers from foreign institutions aiming to the recognition of their diplomas and titles in France (see CTI History).
- The evaluation of training courses for French and foreign engineers with a view to awarding quality labels : CTI is founding member of ENAEE and is entitled to award the EUR-ACE label (European quality label for engineering education).

== Organization and activities ==
=== Statutes ===
CTI is an autonomous structure within the Ministry of Higher Education and Research. Its funding comes from, on one hand, a ministerial grant and, in on the other hand, contributions from accredited schools and establishments. It benefits from logistical support from the ministry (Registry of the CTI).

=== Accreditation process ===
CTI is fully compliant with the "Standards and guidelines for quality assurance in the European Higher Education Area" and, in the specific engineering domain, with "Best practice in Engineering accreditation, jointly developed by ENAEE and IEA (International Engineering Alliance).

The accreditation process comprises:

- Writing by the program management of a self-assessment report according to the standards of "References and Guidelines"
- On-site audit mission by a group of experts, led by a CTI member; the experts write an audit report.
- In general assembly, based on the audit report and its presentation, the Commission gives its conclusions, which can range from non-accreditation to accreditation for a maximum period (five years); accreditation for a more limited period is granted when the program must meet urgent recommendations.
- The CTI conclusions are sent to the ministry in charge of higher education.
- There is an appeal process for institutions wishing to challenge the commission's opinion.

=== Accredited degrees ===
While in many countries, the engineer degree is available in 2 levels (academic degrees): Bachelor and Master, in France, CTI has always accredited engineer degree at Master level.

From 2020, it will also be responsible for evaluating Bachelor's courses for engineers, including those aimed at dual skills, such as engineering and management.

Each year, an updated list of the French and foreign institutions authorized to issue the "Ingénieur diplômé" diploma, is published in the French Journal Officiel.

To meet the public's demand for verified information on engineering training, CTI updates a database every year: "CTI certified data", available to the public.

== Note ==
This content is adapted from the translation of the French CTI page.

== See also ==
- Commission Nationale de la Certification Professionnelle
- Conférence des Directeurs des Écoles Françaises d'Ingénieurs
- Conférence des Grandes Écoles
- Education in France
