= 2017 in literature =

This article contains information about the literary events and publications of 2017.

== Events ==
- March – Emulating Kerouac's On the Road, Ross Goodwin drives from New York to New Orleans with an artificial intelligence device in a laptop hooked up to various sensors, whose output it turns into words printed on rolls of thermal paper; the result is published unedited as 1 the Road in 2018.
- August – The Chinese crime novelist Liu Yongbiao is arrested and eventually sentenced to death for four murders committed 22 years before.
- August 30 – A hard disk drive containing unfinished work by the English comic fantasy novelist Sir Terry Pratchett (died 2015) is crushed by a steamroller on his instructions.
- October 5 - The Swedish Academy announce that the 2017 Nobel Prize in Literature is awarded to Kazuo Ishiguro.
- October – Tianjin Binhai Library opens in China.
- December – Kristen Roupenian's short story "Cat Person" is published in The New Yorker and becomes a viral phenomenon online, with more than 2.6 million hits.

== Anniversaries ==
- Tercentenary of the Aberbaijani poet Molla Panah Vagif's birth in 1717
- 600th anniversary of the death of the Turkic mystical poet Imadaddin Nasimi in 1417
- March 19 – Bicentenary of the Slovak writer Jozef Miloslav Hurban's birth
- May 8 – The American novelist Thomas Pynchon turns 80.
- June 18 – Centenary of the death of the Romanian literary critic and former prime minister Titu Maiorescu
- June 26 – 20th anniversary of the publication of Harry Potter and the Philosopher's Stone (U.K. edition)
- July 12 – 200th birthday of Henry David Thoreau, author of Walden
- July 14 – Bicentenary of the early French salonnière Madame de Staël's death
- July 18 – Bicentenary of the novelist Jane Austen's death in 1817
- Nov 30 – 350th anniversary of the Anglo-Irish satirist Jonathan Swift's birth in 1667
- December 4 – Bicentenary of the birth of Nikoloz Baratashvili's in 1817, who introduced European style into Georgian literature.

== New books ==
Dates after each title indicate U.S. publication, unless otherwise indicated.

=== Fiction ===
- Ayobami Adebayo – Stay With Me (March 2, UK)
- Paul Auster – 4 3 2 1 (January 31)
- Brunonia Barry – The Fifth Petal: a novel
- Darcey Bell – A Simple Favor (March 1)
- Dan Brown – Origin (October 3)
- Peter Carey – A Long Way From Home (October 30, Australia)
- J. M. Coetzee – The Schooldays of Jesus (February 21)
- Claire G. Coleman – Terra Nullius
- Curtis Dawkins – The Graybar Hotel (July 4)
- Didier Decoin – Le bureau des jardins et des étangs (The Office of Gardens and Ponds) (France)
- Steve Erickson – Shadowbahn
- Christine Féret-Fleury – La fille qui lisait dans le Métro (The Girl who Read on the Metro) (March 9, France)
- Karl Geary – Montpelier Parade (August 31)
- John Grisham – Camino Island (June 6)
- Mohsin Hamid – Exit West (March 2, UK)
- Catherine Hernandez - Scarborough
- Alan Hollinghurst – The Sparsholt Affair (September 26, UK)
- Gail Honeyman – Eleanor Oliphant is Completely Fine (UK)
- N. K. Jemisin – The Stone Sky (August 15)
- Lisa Jewell – Then She Was Gone (July 27, UK)
- The Justified Ancients of Mu Mu (Bill Drummond and Jimmy Cauty) – 2023 (August 23, UK)
- Attica Locke – Bluebird, Bluebird
- Ian McDonald – Luna: Wolf Moon (March 23, UK)
- Jon McGregor – Reservoir 13 (April 6, UK)
- Claude McKay (died 1948) – Amiable with Big Teeth: A Novel of the Love Affair Between the Communists and the Poor Black Sheep of Harlem (February 7; written 1941)
- Robert Menasse – Die Hauptstadt (The Capital) (Germany)
- Denise Mina – The Long Drop (March 2, UK)
- Fiona Mozley – Elmet (August 10, UK)
- Neel Mukherjee – A State of Freedom (July 6, UK)
- Timothy Ogene – The Day Ends Like Any Day (April 6, UK)
- James Patterson & Candice Fox – Never Never (January 16, US)
- Tim Pears – The Horseman (January, UK)
- Gwendoline Riley – First Love (February, UK)
- Sally Rooney – Conversations with Friends (June, UK)
- George Saunders – Lincoln in the Bardo (February 14)
- Rachel Seiffert – A Boy in Winter (June 1, UK)
- Kamila Shamsie – Home Fire (August 15, UK)
- Joss Sheldon – Money Power Love (October 7, UK)
- Elizabeth Strout – Anything is Possible (April 25)
- J. R. R. Tolkien (died 1973), edited by Christopher Tolkien – Beren and Lúthien (June 1, UK; original version written 1917)
- Zlatko Topčić
  - Dagmar
  - The Final Word (Zavrsna rijec)
- Éric Vuillard – The Order of the Day (L'Ordre du jour) (April 29, France)
- Jesmyn Ward – Sing, Unburied, Sing (September 5)
- Sarah Winman – Tin Man (July 27, UK)
- Kathleen Winter – Lost in September

=== Children and young people ===
- Galia Bernstein – I Am a Cat (November, Australia, Singapore)
- Sarah Crossan – Moonrise (September 1, UK)
- Lissa Evans – Wed Wabbit (January 5, UK)
- Susie Ghahremani – Stack the Cats (USA)
- Connie Glynn – Undercover Princess (October 30, UK)
- Kiran Millwood Hargrave – The Island at the End of Everything (May 4, UK)
- Amanda Hocking – Freeks (January 3)
- Anna McQuinn – Lulu Gets a Cat
- Philip Pullman – La Belle Sauvage, first volume in The Book of Dust trilogy (October 19, UK)
- Katherine Rundell – The Explorer (August 10, UK)
- Angie Thomas – The Hate U Give (September 28)
- Jacqueline Wilson – Wave Me Goodbye (May 18, UK)

=== Poetry ===
- Helen Dunmore (died June 5) – Inside the Wave (April 27, UK)
- Robert Macfarlane (illustrated by Jackie Morris) – The Lost Words: A Spell Book (October, UK)
- Sinéad Morrissey – On Balance (May 25)

=== Drama ===
- Jez Butterworth – The Ferryman
- Inua Ellams – Barber Shop Chronicles

=== Non-fiction ===
- Simon Critchley – What We Think About When We Think About Football
- Joan Didion – South and West
- Nathaniel Frank – Awakening: How Gays and Lesbians Brought Marriage Equality to America
- Howard W. French – Everything Under the Heavens: How the Past Helps Shape China's Push for Global Power
- David Grann – Killers of the Flower Moon
- Paul Hawken – Drawdown (April 18)
- Michel Houellebecq – En présence de Schopenhauer (January 11, France)
- Christine Hyung-Oak Lee – Tell Me Everything You Don't Remember (February 14)
- Obi Kaufmann – The California Field Atlas (September 1)
- Roel Konijnendijk - Classical Greek Tactics
- Jamie Oliver – 5 Ingredients – Quick and Easy Food (August 24, UK)
- Walter Scheidel – The Great Leveler: Violence and the History of Inequality from the Stone Age to the Twenty-First Century
- Matt Taibbi – Insane Clown President (January 17)
- Hedi Yahmed – I Was in Raqqa (كنت في الرقة)

=== Biography and memoirs ===
- Craig Brown – Ma’am Darling: 99 Glimpses of Princess Margaret (September 21, UK)
- Richard Ford – Between Them: Remembering My Parents (May 2)
- Adam Kay – This is Going to Hurt: Secret Diaries of a Junior Doctor (September 7, UK)
- Caroline Moorehead – A Bold and Dangerous Family: The Rossellis and the Fight Against Mussolini (June 15)
- Rebecca Stott – In the Days of Rain: a daughter, a father, a cult (June 1, UK)
- Stephen Westaby – Fragile Lives: A Heart Surgeon's Stories of Life and Death on the Operating Table (February 9, UK)
- Xiaolu Guo – Once Upon a Time in the East (January 26)

== Deaths ==
Birth years link to the corresponding "[year] in literature" article:

- January 2 – John Berger, English novelist, painter, art critic and poet, 90 (born 1926)
- January 12 – William Peter Blatty, American author (The Exorcist), 89 (born 1928)
- January 25:
  - Buchi Emecheta, Nigerian novelist and children's writer (The Bride Price, The Joys of Motherhood), 72 (born 1944)
  - Harry Mathews, American novelist and poet, 86 (born 1930)
- January 29 – Howard Frank Mosher, American novelist (Where the Rivers Flow North), 74 (born 1942)
- January 30 - Teresa Amy, Uruguayan poet and translator, 66 (born 1950)
- February 1 – William Melvin Kelley, African-American novelist, 79 (born 1937)
- February 8 – Tom Raworth, English poet, 78 (born 1938)
- March 10 – Robert James Waller, American novelist (The Bridges of Madison County), 77 (b. 1939)
- March 16 – Torgny Lindgren, Swedish writer, 78 (born 1938)
- March 17 – Derek Walcott, Saint Lucian poet and playwright, Nobel Laureate in 1992, 87 (b. 1930)
- April 1 – Yevgeny Yevtushenko, Russian poet, 84 (b. 1933)
- May 1:
  - Anatoly Aleksin, Russian writer and poet, 92
  - Mohamed Talbi, Tunisian historian, 95
- May 24 – Denis Johnson, American poet, novelist (Tree of Smoke), and short story writer (Jesus' Son), 67 (born 1949).
- June 2
  - Jaroslav Kořán, Czech translator, writer and politician, 77
  - Barrie Pettman, English author, publisher and philanthropist, 73
  - S. Abdul Rahman, Indian poet, 79
- June 4
  - Juan Goytisolo, Spanish essayist, poet and novelist, 86
  - Jack Trout, American marketer and author, 82
- June 5
  - Helen Dunmore, English poet, novelist and children's writer, 64 (born 1952)
  - Anna Jókai, Hungarian writer, 84
- June 8 – Naseem Khan, British journalist, 77
- June 12 – C. Narayana Reddy, Indian poet and writer, Jnanpith Awardee, 85
- June 27 – Michael Bond, English author (Paddington Bear), 91 (born 1926)
- June 28 – Bruce Stewart, New Zealand author and playwright, 80
- July 2
  - Tony Bianchi, Welsh-language author, 65
  - Jack Collom, American poet, essayist and poetry teacher, 85
  - Abiola Irele, Nigerian literary critic, 81
  - Fay Zwicky, Australian poet, 83
- July 5 – Irina Ratushinskaya, Russian poet, 63 (cancer)
- July 9
  - Miep Diekmann, Dutch writer of children's literature, 92 (born 1925)
  - Anton Nossik, Russian writer and internet entrepreneur, 51 (heart attack)
- July 10 – Peter Härtling, German writer and poet, 83
- September 23 – Harvey Jacobs, American author, 87
- November 20 – Amir Hamed, Uruguayan writer, essayist and translator, 55 (born 1962)
- November 23 – Božena Mačingová, Slovak writer, author of books for children and young adults (born 1922)
- December 28 – Sue Grafton, American mystery author, 77

== Awards ==
In alphabetical order of prize names:

- Baileys Women's Prize for Fiction: Naomi Alderman for The Power
- Baillie Gifford Prize: David France for How to Survive a Plague
- Booker Prize: George Saunders for Lincoln in the Bardo
- Caine Prize for African Writing: Bushra Elfadil, "The Story of the Girl Whose Bird Flew Away"
- Camões Prize: Manuel Alegre
- Costa Book Awards: Helen Dunmore (died June 5) for Inside the Wave (poetry)
- Danuta Gleed Literary Award: Kris Bertin, Bad Things Happen
- David Cohen Prize: Tom Stoppard
- Dayne Ogilvie Prize: Kai Cheng Thom
- Desmond Elliott Prize: Francis Spufford, Golden Hill
- DSC Prize for South Asian Literature:
- Dylan Thomas Prize: Fiona McFarlane for The High Places
- European Book Prize: David Van Reybrouck, Zink and, Raffaele Simone, Si la démocratie fait faillite
- Folio Prize: Hisham Matar for The Return
- Friedenspreis des Deutschen Buchhandels: Margaret Atwood
- German Book Prize: Robert Menasse for Die Hauptstadt
- Goldsmiths Prize: Nicola Barker for H(a)ppy
- Gordon Burn Prize: Denise Mina for The Long Drop
- Governor General's Award for English-language fiction: Joel Thomas Hynes, We'll All Be Burnt in Our Beds Some Night
- Governor General's Award for French-language fiction: Christian Guay-Poliquin, Le Poids de la neige
- Grand Prix du roman de l'Académie française:
- Hugo Award for Best Novel: N. K. Jemisin for The Obelisk Gate
- International Booker Prize: David Grossman for A Horse Walks Into a Bar
- International Prize for Arabic Fiction: Mohammed Hasan Alwan for A Small Death
- International Dublin Literary Award: José Eduardo Agualusa for A General Theory of Oblivion
- James Tait Black Memorial Prize for Fiction:
- James Tait Black Memorial Prize for Biography:
- Kerry Group Irish Fiction Award:
- Lambda Literary Awards: Various categories, see 29th Lambda Literary Awards
- Miguel de Cervantes Prize:
- Miles Franklin Award: Josephine Wilson for Extinctions
- National Biography Award:
- National Book Award for Fiction:
- National Book Critics Circle Award:
- Newdigate Prize: Dominic Hand
- Nike Award:
- Nobel Prize in Literature: Kazuo Ishiguro
- PEN/Faulkner Award for Fiction: Imbolo Mbue for Behold the Dreamers
- PEN Center USA Fiction Award:
- Premio Planeta de Novela:
- Premio Strega:
- Pritzker Literature Award for Lifetime Achievement in Military Writing:
- Prix Goncourt:
- Pulitzer Prize for Fiction: Colson Whitehead for The Underground Railroad
- Pulitzer Prize for Poetry: Tyehimba Jess for Olio
- RBC Taylor Prize: Ross King for Mad Enchantment: Claude Monet and the Painting of the Water Lilies
- Rogers Writers' Trust Fiction Prize: David Chariandy, Brother
- Russian Booker Prize:
- Scotiabank Giller Prize: Michael Redhill, Bellevue Square
- Golden Wreath of Struga Poetry Evenings:
- Walter Scott Prize: Sebastian Barry for Days Without End
- W.Y. Boyd Literary Award for Excellence in Military Fiction:
- Zbigniew Herbert International Literary Award: Breyten Breytenbach
