= Aleksin (surname) =

Aleksin is a surname. Notable people with the surname include:

- Anatoly Aleksin (1924–2017), Soviet, Russian and Israeli writer and poet
- Aliaksei Aleksin (born 1966), Belarusian businessman
