= Human rights in the Islamic State =

The condition of human rights in the territory controlled by the Islamic State (IS) is considered to be among the worst in the world. The Islamic State's policies included acts of genocide, torture and slavery. The United Nations Commission on Human Rights (UNCHR) stated in November 2014 that the Islamic State "seeks to subjugate civilians under its control and dominate every aspect of their lives through terror, indoctrination, and the provision of services to those who obey". Many Islamic State actions of extreme criminality, terror, recruitment and other activities have been documented in the Middle East.

The territories in Iraq and Syria, which was occupied by the Islamic State and claimed as part of its self-dubbed "Caliphate" saw the creation of one of the most criminally active, corrupt and violent regimes in modern times, and it ruled that territory until its defeat. IS murdered tens of thousands of civilians, kidnapped several thousand people, and forced hundreds of thousands of others to flee. It systematically committed torture, mass rapes, forced marriages, extreme acts of ethnic cleansing, mass murder, genocide, robbery, extortion, smuggling, slavery, kidnappings, and the use of child soldiers; in its implementation of strict interpretations of Sharia law which were based on ancient eighth-century methods, they carried out public "punishments" such as beheadings, crucifixions, beatings, mutilation and dismemberment, the stoning of both children and adults, and the live burning of people. IS members committed rape against tens of thousands of girls and women (mainly members of non-Sunni minority groups and families).

Several human rights organizations and peace organizations, including Human Rights Watch, the United Nations and Amnesty International, have deemed IS guilty of crimes against humanity, and they have also accused the whole IS organization of being a criminal organization, one which has committed some of the most severe war crimes since the Axis powers of World War II (particularly Nazi Germany and Imperial Japan).

== UN's determinations ==
A UN report released in 2014 stated that between 6 July and 10 September 2014, IS and allied insurgent groups launched violence in an "apparent systematic and widespread character" across Iraq. The report stated that these violent acts included forced abductions and perpetration of "sexual and physical violence" against women and children.

In November 2014, the UN's Independent International Commission of Inquiry on the Syrian Arab Republic said that the Islamic State was committing crimes against humanity and that it "seeks to subjugate civilians under its control and dominate every aspect of their lives through terror, indoctrination, and the provision of services to those who obey." In October 2015, the UN Human Rights Council "strongly condemn[ed] the terrorist acts and violence committed against civilians by the so-called Islamic State in Iraq and the Levant (Daesh), al-Nusrah Front and other extremist groups, and their continued gross, systematic and widespread abuses of human rights and violations of international humanitarian law, and reaffirm[ed] that terrorism, including the actions of the so-called Islamic State in Iraq and the Levant (Daesh), cannot and should not be associated with any religion, nationality or civilization."

== Statements by human rights groups ==
A report by Human Rights Watch in November 2014 accused IS militants in Libya's Derna of war crimes and human rights abuses and of terrorizing residents. Human Rights Watch documented three apparent incidents in which captives were killed and at least ten public floggings by the Islamic Youth Shura Council, which joined IS in November. It also documented the beheading of three Derna residents and dozens of seemingly politically motivated assassinations of judges, public officials, members of the security forces and others. Sarah Leah Watson, Director of HRW Middle East and North Africa, said: "Commanders should understand that they may face domestic or international prosecution for the grave rights abuses their forces are committing."

Various human rights groups and many Iraqi Turkmen themselves accused the Islamic State of carrying Anti-Turkish thoughts, which led to the Iraqi Turkmen genocide.

Amnesty International has held IS responsible for the ethnic cleansing of ethnic and religious minority groups in northern Iraq on a "historic scale". It issued a special report in late 2014 describing how IS has "systematically targeted non-Arab and non-Sunni Muslim communities, killing or abducting hundreds, possibly thousands, and forcing more than 830,000 others to flee the areas it has captured since 10 June 2014". Among these people are Assyrian Christians, Turkmen Shia, Shabak Shia, Yazidis, Kaka'i and Mandaeans, who have lived together for centuries in Nineveh province, large parts of which became under IS's control.

== Genocide and other war crimes ==
IS's crimes of murder, ethnic cleansing, enslavement and rape against Shia, Christian, Yazidis and various religious minorities within its territories were recognized as a genocide by the European Parliament and U.S. House of Representatives in 2014. In 2017, CNN journalists Jomana Karadsheh and Chris Jackson reported exclusively on the efforts by Commission for International Justice and Accountability (CIJA) to bring IS to justice of war crimes committed against Yazidis. There are also many Sunni Muslim victims of IS.

One captured IS fighter boasted about raping over 200 women from Iraq's minority groups and killing over 500 people and claimed he was encouraged to do so by the leadership.

On occasions, IS executed women who refused to have sex with its fighters. In a briefing to the UN Security Council held on 10 May 2021, a UN investigative team stated that IS launched a genocide against Yazidis "as a religious group" during the Sinjar massacre, with the objective of eliminating them "physically and biologically".

=== Religious and minority group massacres, forced conversion, and expulsion ===
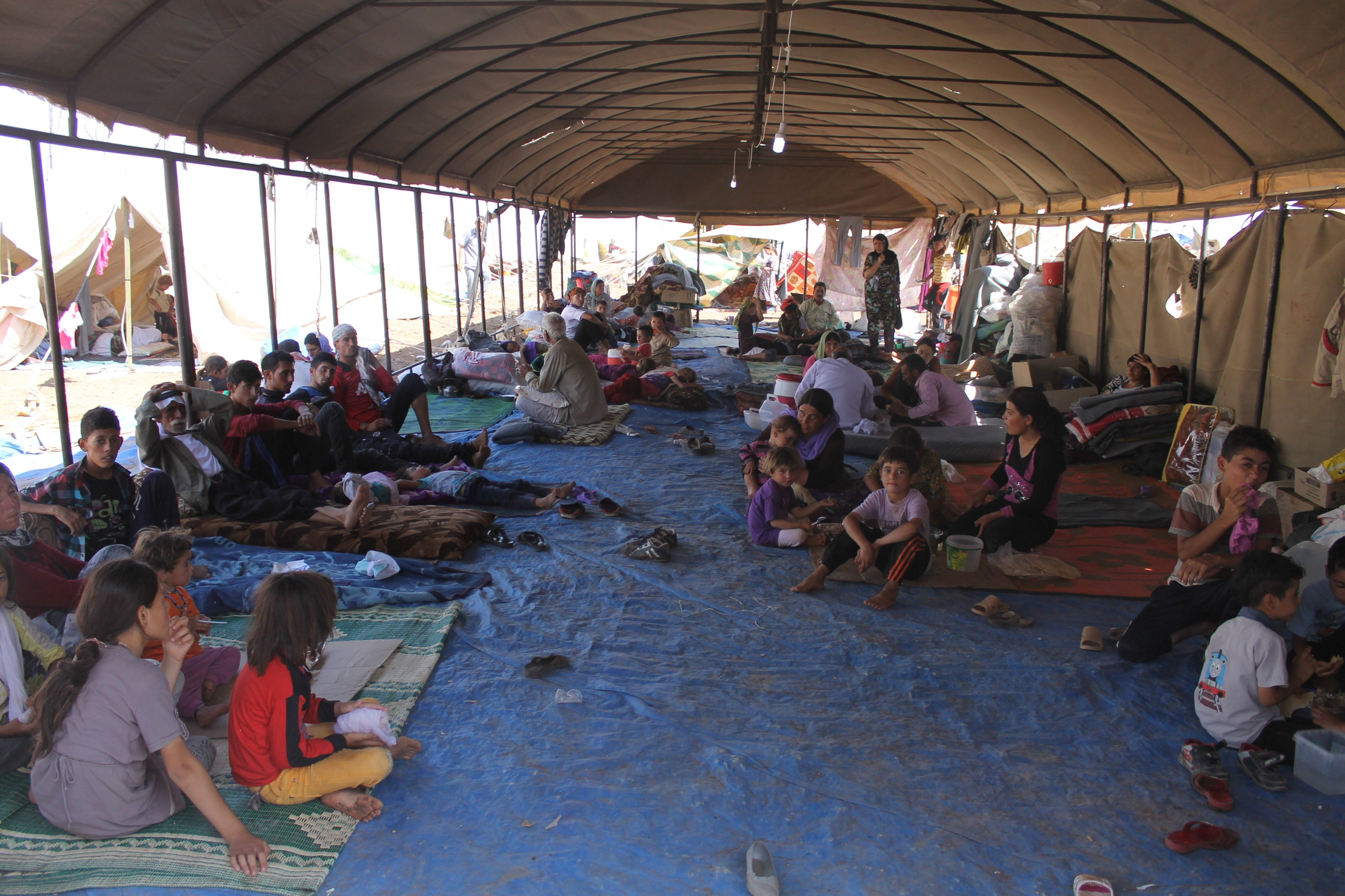
Yazidi refugees on Mount Sinjar in August 2014

IS compels people in the areas that it controls to live according to its interpretation of sharia law. There have been many reports of the group's use of death threats, torture and mutilation to compel conversion to Islam, and of clerics being killed for refusal to pledge allegiance to the so-called "Islamic State". IS directs violence against Shia Muslims, Alawites, Assyrian and Armenian Christians, Yazidis, Druze, Shabaks and Mandeans in particular.

IS fighters have targeted Syria's minority Alawite sect. IS and affiliated jihadist groups reportedly took the lead in an offensive on Alawite villages in Latakia Governorate of Syria in August 2013.

Amnesty International has held IS responsible for the ethnic cleansing of ethnic and religious minority groups in northern Iraq on a "historic scale", putting entire communities "at risk of being wiped off the map of Iraq". In a special report released on 2 September 2014, the organization described how IS had "systematically targeted non-Arab and non-Sunni Muslim communities, killing or abducting hundreds, possibly thousands, of individuals and forcing more than 830,000 others to flee the areas it has captured since 10 June 2014". Among these people were Assyrian Christians, Turkmen Shia, Shabak Shia, Kaka'i, Yazidis and Mandaeans, who have lived together for centuries in Nineveh province, large parts of which have come under IS's control.

Among the known killings of religious and minority group civilians carried out by IS are those in the villages and towns of Quiniyeh (70–90 Yazidis killed), Hardan (60 Yazidis killed), Sinjar (500–2,000 Yazidis killed), Ramadi Jabal (60–70 Yazidis killed), Dhola (50 Yazidis killed), Khana Sor (100 Yazidis killed), Hardan area (250–300 Yazidis killed), al-Shimal (dozens of Yazidis killed), Khocho (400 Yazidis killed and 1,000 abducted), Jadala (14 Yazidis killed) and Beshir (700 Shia Turkmen killed), and others committed near Mosul (670 Shia inmates of the Badush prison killed), and in Tal Afar prison, Iraq (200 Yazidis killed for refusing conversion). The UN estimated that 5,000 Yazidis were killed by IS during the takeover of parts of northern Iraq in August 2014. In late May 2014, 150 Kurdish boys from Kobani aged 14–16 were abducted and subjected to torture and abuse, according to Human Rights Watch. In the Syrian towns of Ghraneij, Abu Haman and Kashkiyeh 700 members of the Sunni Al-Shaitat tribe were killed for attempting an uprising against IS control. The UN reported that in June 2014 IS had killed a number of Sunni Islamic clerics who refused to pledge allegiance to it.

Christians living in areas under IS control face four options: converting to Islam, paying a religious levy called the jizya, leaving the caliphate, or death. "We offer them three choices: Islam; the dhimma contract – involving payment of jizya; if they refuse this they will have nothing but the sword", IS said. Abu Bakr al-Baghdadi, the leader of IS till his 2019 demise, further noted that Christians who do not agree with those terms must "leave the borders of the Islamic Caliphate" within a specified deadline. IS had already set similar rules for Christians in Raqqa, once one of Syria's more liberal cities. However, on 29 March 2016, IS issued a decree preventing Christians and Armenians from leaving Raqqa.

On 23 February 2015, in response to a major Kurdish offensive in the Al-Hasakah Governorate, IS abducted 150 Assyrian Christians from villages near Tal Tamr (Tell Tamer) in northeastern Syria, after launching a large offensive in the region.

Kurdish officials have claimed that IS's campaign against Kurdish and Yezidi enclaves, such as Sinjar, are part of an organised Arabization plan.

According to Iraqi security officials, Islamic State militants targeted a football ground, built near a Shiite shrine in the city of Kirkuk. They shot mortar rounds that killed six civilians and injured nine others, on August 24, 2019. In another attack day before, a bike equipped with explosives blasted near a mosque in Shia-majority area of Mussayyib, killing three people and wounding 34.

==== Shia Muslims ====
Despite being the religious majority in Iraq, Shia Muslims who predominantly inhabit the country's south were killed in large numbers by IS. By June 2014, IS had already claimed to have killed 1,700 Shia Muslims. IS, attempting to create a Sunni Muslim caliphate, has labelled all Shia Muslims infidels. As a result, they have specifically targeted Shia communities. According to witnesses, after the militant group took the city of Mosul, they divided the Sunni prisoners from the Shia prisoners. 650 Shia prisoners were then taken to another location and executed. Kurdish officials in Erbil have reported similar incidents where Sunni and Shia prisoners were separated and Shia prisoners were killed. Sometimes, Shia were burned alive.

==== Iraqi Turkmen ====
Iraqi Turkmen generally never got involved in the Iraqi conflict until the Islamic State began a violent process of persecution against them. They had 200,000 Turkmen displaced, thousands killed, and hundreds still missing. The Iraqi Turkmen Front stated that the attacks on Turkmens were an ethnic cleansing attempt.

==== Christians ====
Iraqi Christians, the majority being ethnic Assyrians in northern Iraq, have also been targeted by IS. The group warns Christians they must either convert to Islam, pay a fine, or face execution. At one point, IS took over Qaraqosh, Iraq's largest Christian city. Christians who fled the city reported summary executions and mass beheadings. Some were kidnapped and held for ransom. Others were publicly whipped for refusing to convert to Islam. Many Christians were displaced, fleeing their villages to escape IS. The group also systematically destroyed Christian churches and shrines. IS fighters destroyed and vandalized many Christian monuments, and they have taken down crosses from the tops of churches, replacing them with IS flags. They marked Christian homes with an Arabic "N" which stands for "Nasrane", a word used by Muslims to describe followers of the Christian faith.

==== Yazidis ====
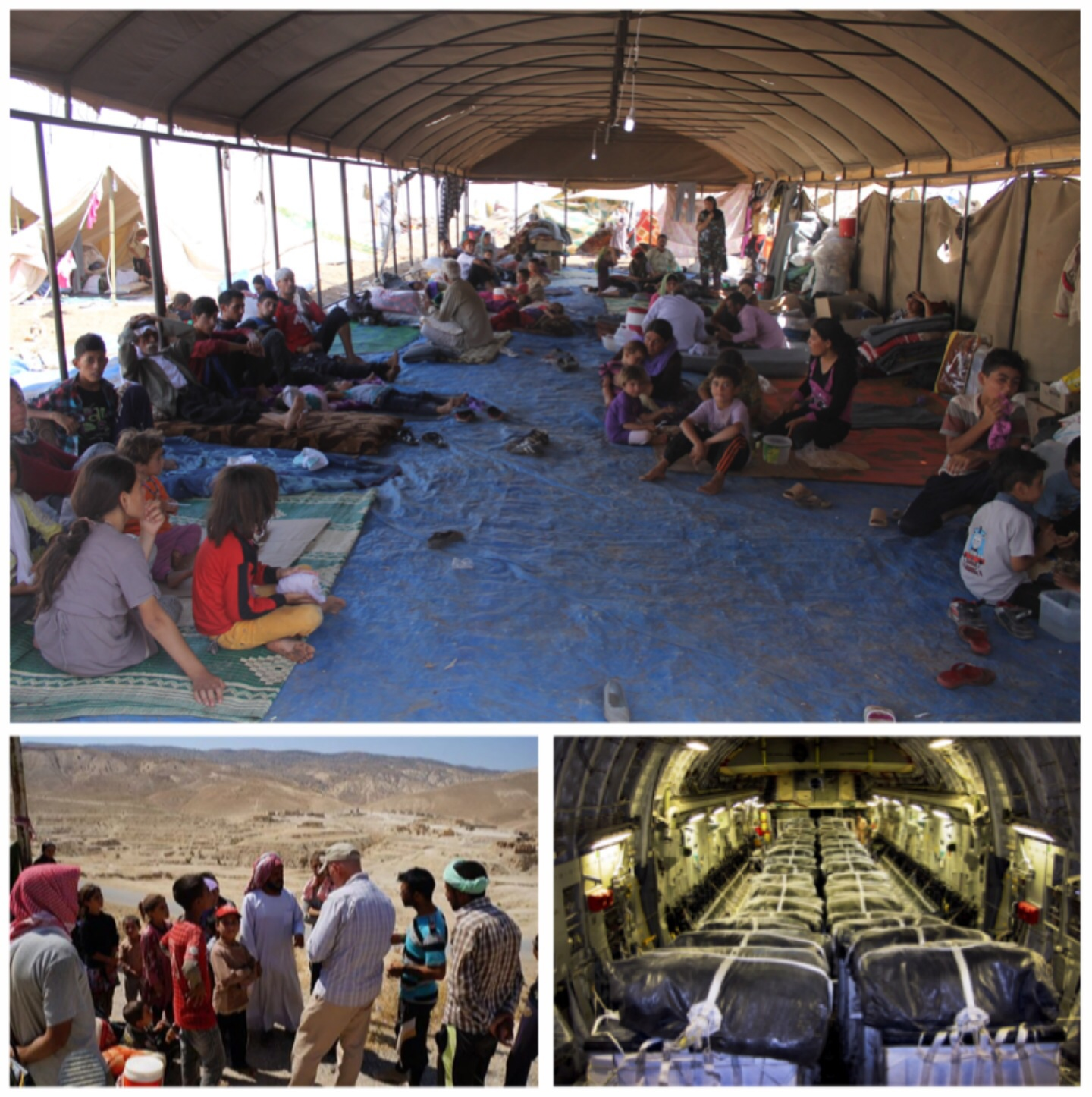
Images from top, left and right: Yazidi refugees receiving support from the International Rescue Committee. A member of the U.S. Mt. Sinjar Assessment Team being greeted by locals near Sinjar, Iraq. Bundles of water inside a C-17 Globemaster III before a humanitarian airdrop by the United States Air Force

The persecution of Yazidis has been labelled a genocide. This religious sect was subjected to massacres, forced conversion, forced exile, rape, torture, slavery, sexual slavery, and forced conscription. There were numerous massacres in attacks on Yazidi villages. In many of the massacres, militants separated the men from the women. Afterward, the men were lined up at checkpoints along the side of the road, shot, and bulldozed into mass graves. Sometimes, men were also given the option of converting to Islam or being executed, so there were many instances of both forced conversions and killings for refusal to convert to IS's version of Islam. Other Yazidi men were forced into Yazidi temples and blown up inside or taken into captivity.

Yazidi women and children captives were often raped by multiple men, typically friends of their captors. They believed that if a woman is raped by ten IS fighters, she would become Muslim. Many were also sold as sex slaves to IS fighters. There are also reports that women forced into sex slavery were subjected to forced abortions. Many of these captives tried to take their own lives.

===== Sinjar Massacre =====
The Sinjar massacre was the killing and abduction of thousands of Yazidi men in Sinjar (Kurdish: شنگال Şingal) city and Sinjar District in Iraq's Nineveh Governorate by IS in August 2014. This event started with IS militants attacking and capturing Sinjar and neighboring towns on 3 August, during IS's offensive in early August 2014.

The New York Times reported on 7 August 2014 that IS had executed dozens of Yazidi men in Sinjar city and had taken their wives for unmarried jihadi fighters. It was also reported that IS fighters executed over ten caretakers of Shia Sayeda Zeinab shrine in Sinjar before blowing it up.

While the siege of Mount Sinjar was continuing, IS killed hundreds of Yazidis in at least six of the nearby villages. 250–300 men were killed in the village of Hardan, 200 between Adnaniya and Jazeera, 70–90 in Qiniyeh, and on the road out of al-Shimal witnesses reported seeing dozens of bodies. Hundreds of others had also been killed for refusing to convert to Islam.

On 15 August 2014, in the Yazidi village of Khocho, south of Sinjar, after the whole population had received the jihadist ultimatum to convert or be killed, over 80 men were killed. A witness recounted that the villagers were first converted under duress, but when the village elder refused to convert, all of the men were taken in trucks under the pretext of being led to Sinjar, and gunned down along the way. According to reports from survivors interviewed by OHCHR, on 15 August, the entire male population of the Yazidi village of Khocho, up to 400 men, were rounded up and shot by IS, and up to 1,000 women and children were abducted.

On the same day, up to 200 Yazidi men were reportedly executed for refusing conversion in a Tal Afar prison. The massacres took place at least until 25 August when IS executed 14 elderly Yazidi men in Sheikh Mand Shrine in Jidala, western Sinjar, and blew up the shrine there.

40,000 or more Yazidis were trapped in the Sinjar Mountains and mostly surrounded by IS forces who were firing on them. They were largely without food, water or medical care, facing starvation and dehydration. Human Rights Watch organization reported in 2018 that IS captured approximately 6,300 Yazidis in Sinjar and forced Yazidi women into "a system of organized rape and sexual slavery".

==== Death toll ====
By 2014, a U.N. Human Rights commission estimated that 9,347 civilians had been murdered by IS in Iraq, then however; by 2016 a second report by the United Nations estimated 18,802 deaths. The Sinjar massacre in 2014 resulted in the killings of between 2,000 and 5,000 civilians.

=== Attacks on members of the press ===
The Committee to Protect Journalists states: "Without a free press, few other human rights are attainable." IS has tortured and murdered local journalists, creating what Reporters Without Borders calls "news blackholes" in areas controlled by IS. IS fighters have reportedly been given written directions to kill or capture journalists.

In December 2013, two suicide bombers stormed the headquarters of TV station Salaheddin and killed five journalists, after accusing the station of "distorting the image of Iraq's Sunni community". Reporters Without Borders reported that on 7 September 2014, IS seized and on 11 October publicly beheaded Raad al-Azzawi, a TV Salaheddin cameraman from the village of Samra, east of Tikrit. As of October 2014, according to the Journalistic Freedoms Observatory, IS held nine journalists and has nine others under close observation in Mosul and Salahuddin province.

During 2013 and part of 2014, an IS unit nicknamed the Beatles acquired and held 12 Western journalists hostage, along with aid workers and other foreign hostages, totalling 23 or 24 known hostages. A Polish journalist Marcin Suder was captured in July 2013 but escaped four months later. The unit executed American journalists James Foley and Steven Sotloff and released beheading videos. Eight of the other journalists were released for ransom: Danish journalist Daniel Rye Ottosen, French journalists Didier François, Edouard Elias, Nicolas Hénin, and Pierre Torres, and Spanish journalists Marc Marginedas, Javier Espinosa, and Ricardo García Vilanova. The unit continues to hold hostage British journalist John Cantlie and a female aid worker.

Cyber-security group the Citizen Lab released a report finding a possible link between IS and a digital attack on the Syrian citizen media group Raqqa Is Being Slaughtered Silently (RSS). Supporters of the media group received an emailed link to an image of supposed airstrikes, but clicking on the link introduced malware to the user's computer that sends details of the user's IP address and system each time it restarts. That information has been enough to allow IS to locate RSS supporters. "The group has been targeted for kidnappings, house raids, and at least one alleged targeted killing. At the time of that writing, IS was allegedly holding several citizen journalists in Raqqa", according to the Citizen Lab report.

On 8 January 2015, IS members in Libya claimed to have executed Tunisian journalists Sofiene Chourabi and Nadhir Ktari who disappeared in September 2014. Also in January 2015, Japanese journalist Kenji Goto was kidnapped and beheaded, after a demand for a $200 million ransom payment was not met.

=== Beheadings and mass executions ===
An unknown number of Syrians and Iraqis, several Lebanese soldiers, male and female Kurdish fighters near Kobanî, two American journalists, one American and two British aid workers, 30 Ethiopian Christians and 21 Egyptian Coptic Christians in Libya were beheaded by IS. The militant group uses beheadings to intimidate local populations and has released a series of propaganda videos aimed at Western countries. IS was reported to have beheaded about 100 foreign fighters as deserters who tried to leave Raqqa.

They also engage in public and mass executions of Syrian and Iraqi soldiers and civilians, sometimes forcing prisoners to dig their own graves before shooting lines of prisoners and pushing them in. Among the known mass executions of captured soldiers carried out by IS are those in Tikrit (IS executed up to 1,700 Shia Iraqi Air Force cadets from Camp Speicher near Tikrit on 12 June 2014), Tabqa (IS executed 250 Syrian soldiers captured at the Al-Tabqa air base between 27 and 28 August 2014), Palmyra (up to 280 Syrian soldiers and government loyalists were shot in the head or beheaded in a public square on 22 May 2015), and Deir ez-Zor (IS killed at least 300 Syrian soldiers, pro-government militiamen and their families on 16 January 2016).

IS executed 600 Shia prisoners in Mosul in June 2014. In November 2014, there were reports that IS fighters massacred more than 630 members of the Albu Nimr tribe in Iraq. Albu Nimr was one of the Sunni Arab tribes that fiercely opposed IS. On 17 December 2014, it was reported by Turkish media, that IS had executed at least 150 women from the Albu Nimr tribe in Falluja for refusing to marry IS militants.

=== Use of chemical weapons ===
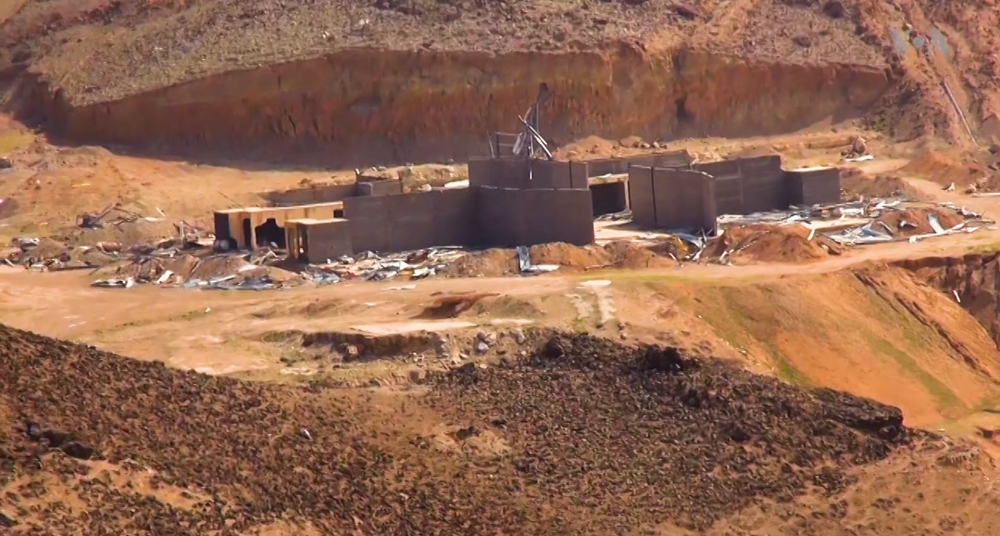
A destroyed IS chemical weapons factory in Deir ez-Zor Governorate, Syria, 9 March 2017

In 2014, the Islamic State launched a program to manufacture chemical weapons with chlorine and a World War I-era toxin which is known as sulfur mustard. Kurds in northern Iraq reported that IS attacked them with chemical weapons in August 2015, which was later confirmed to be mustard gas. At Kobanî, it is highly likely that IS used chlorine gas. These chemical weapons may have been from a chemical weapons storage site at Al-Muthanna, which contained 2,500 chemical rockets. Although the rockets' chemical contents were deteriorated, IS may have used them in a concentrated manner.

=== Destruction of cultural and religious heritage ===
UNESCO's Director-General Irina Bokova has warned that IS is destroying Iraq's cultural heritage, in what she has called "cultural cleansing". "We don't have time to lose because extremists are trying to erase the identity, because they know that if there is no identity, there is no memory, there is no history", she said. Referring to the ancient cultures of Christians, Yazidis and other minorities, she said, "This is a way to destroy identity. You deprive them of their culture, you deprive them of their history, their heritage, and that is why it goes hand in hand with genocide. Along with the physical persecution they want to eliminate – to delete – the memory of these different cultures ... we think this is appalling, and this is not acceptable." Saad Eskander, head of Iraq's National Archives said, "For the first time you have cultural cleansing... For the Yazidis, religion is oral, nothing is written. By destroying their places of worship... you are killing cultural memory. It is the same with the Christians – it really is a threat beyond belief."

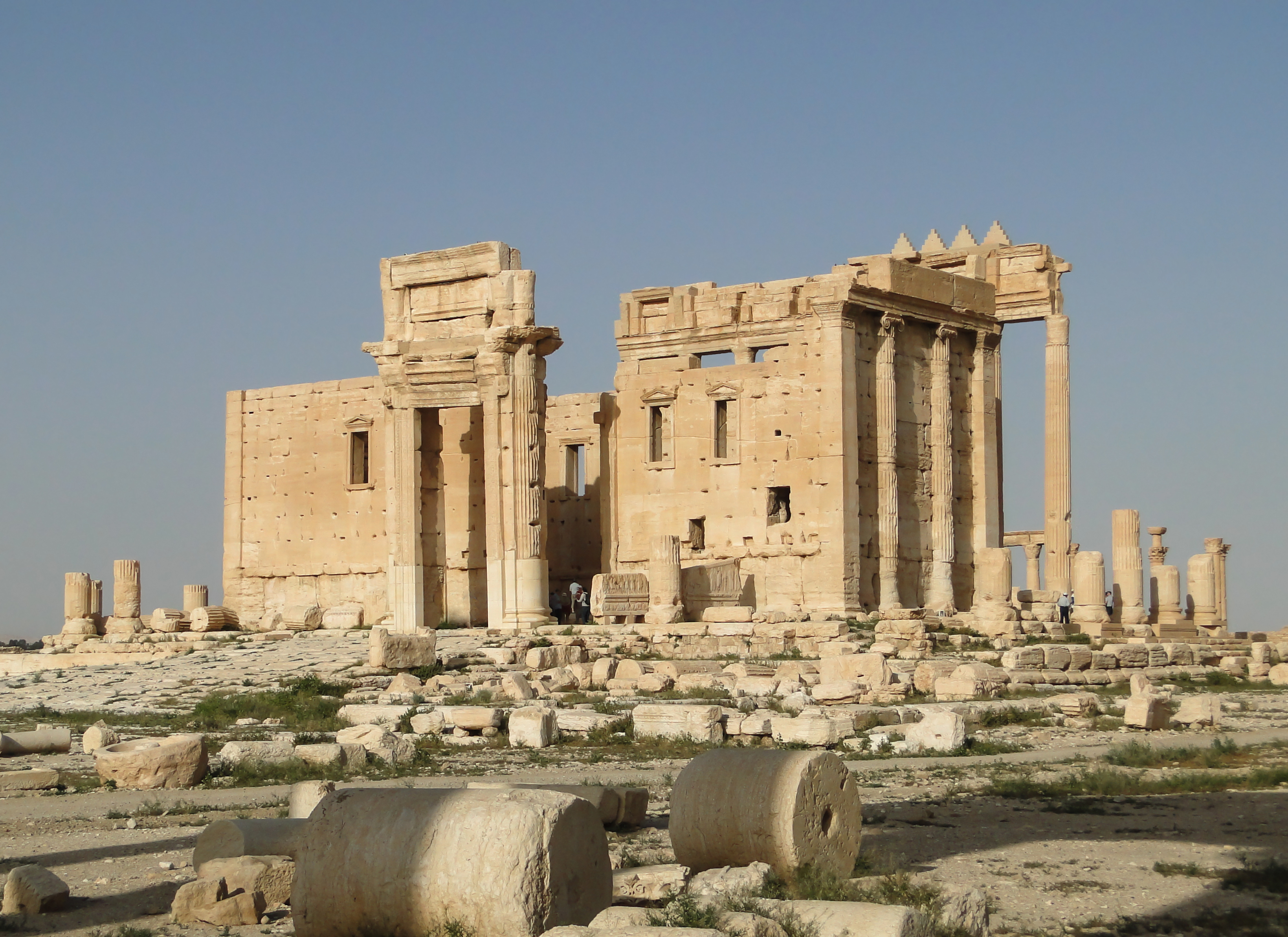
Temple of Bel in Palmyra, which was destroyed by IS in August 2015

To finance its activities, IS stole artefacts from Syria and Iraq, sending them to Europe to be sold. UNESCO has asked for United Nations Security Council controls on the sale of antiquities, similar to those imposed after the 2003 Iraq War. UNESCO is working with Interpol, national customs authorities, museums, and major auction houses in attempts to prevent looted items from being sold. IS occupied Mosul Museum, the second most important museum in Iraq, as it was about to reopen after years of rebuilding following the Iraq War, saying that the statues were against Islam and threatening to destroy the museum's contents.

IS considers worshipping at graves tantamount to idolatry, and seeks to purify the community of unbelievers. It has used bulldozers to crush buildings and archaeological sites. Bernard Haykel has described al-Baghdadi's creed as "a kind of untamed Wahhabism", saying, "For Al Qaeda, violence is a means to an ends [sic]; for ISIS, it is an end in itself". The destruction by IS in July 2014 of the tomb and shrine of the prophet Yunus – Jonah in Christianity – the 13th-century mosque of Imam Yahya Abu al-Qassimin, the 14th-century shrine of prophet Jerjis – St George to Christians – and the attempted destruction of the Hadba minaret at the 12th-century Great Mosque of Al-Nuri have been described as "an unchecked outburst of extreme Wahhabism". "There were explosions that destroyed buildings dating back to the Assyrian era", said National Museum of Iraq director Qais Rashid, referring to the destruction of the shrine of Yunus. He cited another case where "Daesh [IS] gathered over 1,500 manuscripts from convents and other holy places and burnt all of them in the middle of the city square". In March 2015, IS reportedly bulldozed the 13th-century BC Assyrian city of Nimrud, believing its sculptures to be idolatrous. UNESCO head, Irina Bokova, deemed this to be a war crime.

IS has burned or stolen collections of books and papers from the various locations including the Central Library of Mosul (which they rigged with explosives and burned down), the library at the University of Mosul, a Sunni Muslim library, a 265-year-old Latin Church and Monastery of the Dominican Fathers, and the Mosul Museum Library. Some destroyed or stolen works date back to 5000 BCE and include "Iraq newspapers dating to the early 20th century, maps and books from the Ottoman Empire, and book collections contributed by about 100 of Mosul's establishment families." The stated goal is to destroy all non-Islamic books.

An investigation led by the Human Rights Watch disclosed that Al-Hota gorge that was once a beautiful natural site in northeastern Syria is used by IS as a disposal ground for the bodies of people killed by them. The HRW investigation involved analysis of evidence such as videos released by the Islamic State, interviews with locals, along with satellite images and drone footages of the gorge.

== Treatment of civilians ==
During the Iraqi conflict in 2014, IS released dozens of videos showing its ill treatment of civilians, many of whom had apparently been targeted on the basis of their religion or ethnicity. Navi Pillay, UN High Commissioner for Human Rights, warned of war crimes being committed in the Iraqi war zone, and disclosed a UN report of IS militants murdering Iraqi Army soldiers and 17 civilians in a single street in Mosul. The UN reported that in the 17 days from 5 to 22 June, IS killed more than 1,000 Iraqi civilians and injured more than 1,000. After IS released photographs of its fighters shooting scores of young men, the UN declared that cold-blooded "executions" by militants in northern Iraq almost certainly amounted to war crimes.

IS's advance in Iraq in mid-2014 was accompanied by continuing violence in Syria. On 29 May, IS raided a village in Syria and at least 15 civilians were killed, including, according to Human Rights Watch, at least six children. A hospital in the area confirmed that it had received 15 bodies on the same day. The Syrian Observatory for Human Rights reported that on 1 June, a 102-year-old man was killed along with his whole family in a village in Hama province. According to Reuters, 1,878 people were killed in Syria by IS during the last six months of 2014, most of them civilians.

During its occupation of Mosul, IS implemented a sharia school curriculum which banned the teaching of art, music, national history, literature and Christianity. Although Charles Darwin's theory of evolution has never been taught in Iraqi schools, that subject was also banned from the school curriculum. Patriotic songs were declared blasphemous, and orders were given to remove certain pictures from school textbooks. Iraqi parents largely boycotted schools in which the new curriculum was introduced.

After capturing cities in Iraq, IS issued guidelines on how to wear clothes and veils. IS warned women in the city of Mosul to wear full-face veils or face severe punishment. A cleric told Reuters in Mosul that IS gunmen had ordered him to read out the warning in his mosque when worshippers gathered. IS ordered the faces of both male and female mannequins to be covered, in an order which also banned the use of naked mannequins. In Raqqa the group used its two battalions of female fighters in the city to enforce compliance by women with its strict laws on individual conduct.

IS released 16 notes labelled "Contract of the City", a set of rules aimed at civilians in Nineveh. One rule stipulated that women should stay at home and not go outside unless necessary. Another rule said that stealing would be punished by amputation. In addition to banning the sale and use of alcohol, IS banned the sale and use of cigarettes and hookah pipes. It also banned "music and songs in cars, at parties, in shops and in public, as well as photographs of people in shop windows".

According to The Economist, the group also adopted certain practices seen in Saudi Arabia, including the establishment of religious police to root out "vice" and enforce attendance at daily prayers, the widespread use of capital punishment, and the destruction of Christian churches and non-Sunni mosques or their conversion to other uses.

IS carried out executions on both men and women who were accused of various acts and found guilty of crimes against Islam such as sodomy, adultery, usage and possession of contraband, rape, blasphemy, witchcraft, renouncing Islam and murder. Before the accused were executed, their charges were read to them and the spectators. Executions take various forms, including stoning to death, crucifixions, beheadings, burning people alive, and throwing people from tall buildings. The Islamic State in Iraq frequently carried out mass executions in Mosul and Hawija.

The Islamic State militants were accused of using civilian residents of towns as human shields. The Telegraph reported that "Extremist fighters are deliberately hiding among civilian buildings and residents to try to prevent strikes." Civil rights activist told ARA News that "ISIS militants prevent the people of Manbij and Jarablus from leaving their hometowns despite the fierce airstrikes by Russian warplanes". The use of human shields and executions of civilians who tried to flee continued in Iraq right through until the group lost is final major urban territory there after its defeat in the Battle for Mosul in July 2017.

In August 2019, the terror group claimed responsibility of the suicide bomb attack in a crowded wedding hall in Kabul. It marked one of the most devastating attacks on civilians in years of conflict and terror, where nearly 63 people died and more than 180 were wounded.

=== Child soldiers ===
According to a report by the magazine Foreign Policy, children as young as six are recruited or kidnapped and sent to military and religious training camps, where they practice beheading with dolls and are indoctrinated with the religious views of IS. Children are used as human shields on front lines and to provide blood transfusions for Islamic State soldiers, according to Shelly Whitman of the Roméo Dallaire Child Soldiers Initiative. The second installment of a Vice News documentary about IS focused on how the group is specifically grooming children for the future. A spokesman told VICE News that those under the age of 15 go to sharia camp to learn about religion, while those older than 16 can go to military training camp. Children are also used for propaganda. According to a UN report, "In mid-August, IS entered a cancer hospital in Mosul, forced at least two sick children to hold the IS flag and posted the pictures on the internet." Misty Buswell, a Save the Children representative working with refugees in Jordan, said, "It's not an exaggeration to say we could lose a whole generation of children to trauma." A UN report indicated that at least 89 children, mostly from the ages of 12 to 16 had been killed fighting for the Islamic State in 2015, 39% of which died in suicide bombing attacks. Der Spiegel estimated in 2016 that 1,500 boys were serving as child soldiers for IS. It was reported that on 12 March 2017, IS used 6 child suicide bombers against the Syrian Army soldiers besieged in Deir ez-Zor.

=== Sexual violence and slavery ===
The sexual violence which was perpetrated by IS included its use of rape as a weapon of war; instituting forced marriages to its fighters; and trading women and girls as sex slaves.

There are many reports of sexual abuse and enslavement in IS-controlled areas of women and girls, predominantly from the minority Christian and Yazidi communities. Fighters were told that they were free to have sex with or rape non-Muslim captive women. Haleh Esfandiari from the Woodrow Wilson International Center for Scholars has highlighted the abuse of local women by IS militants after they have captured an area. "They usually take the older women to a makeshift slave market and try to sell them. The younger girls ... are raped or married off to fighters", she said, adding, "It's based on temporary marriages, and once these fighters have had sex with these young girls, they just pass them on to other fighters." The three winners of a June 2015 Quran-memorization contest in Mosul were given sex slaves as prizes.

The capture of Iraqi cities by the group in June 2014 was accompanied by an upsurge in crimes against women, including kidnap and rape. According to Martin Williams in The Citizen, some hard-line Salafists apparently regard extramarital sex with multiple partners as a legitimate form of holy war and it is "difficult to reconcile this with a religion where some adherents insist that women must be covered from head to toe, with only a narrow slit for the eyes".

As of August 2015, the trade in sex slaves appeared to remain restricted to Yazidi women and girls. It has reportedly become a recruiting technique to attract men from conservative Muslim societies, where dating and casual sex are not allowed. Nazand Begikhani said of the Yazidi victims, "These women have been treated like cattle ... They have been subjected to physical and sexual violence, including systematic rape and sex slavery. They've been exposed in markets in Mosul and in Raqqa, Syria, carrying price tags." According to UN Reports, the price list for IS sex slaves ranged from 40 to 160 US dollars. The younger the slave the more expensive. Girls and boys between the age 1–9 were referred to as the most expensive, with the cheapest being women between 40 and 50 years old. According to another source, the price of a slave equals the price of an AK-47.

A United Nations report issued on 2 October 2014, based on 500 interviews with witnesses, said that IS took 450–500 women and girls to Iraq's Nineveh region in August, where "150 unmarried girls and women, predominantly from the Yazidi and Christian communities, were reportedly transported to Syria, either to be given to ISIL fighters as a reward or to be sold as sex slaves". In mid-October, the UN confirmed that 5,000–7,000 Yazidi women and children had been abducted by IS and sold into slavery. In November 2014 The New York Times reported on the accounts given by five who escaped IS of their captivity and abuse. In December 2014, the Iraqi Ministry of Human Rights announced that IS had killed over 150 women and girls in Fallujah who refused to participate in sexual jihad. Non-Muslim women have reportedly been married off to fighters against their will. IS claims the women provide the new converts and children necessary to spread IS's control.

Shortly after the death of US hostage Kayla Mueller was confirmed on 10 February 2015, several media outlets reported that the US intelligence community believed she may have been given as a wife to an IS fighter. In August 2015 it was confirmed that she had been forced into marriage to Abu Bakr al-Baghdadi, who raped her repeatedly. The Mueller family was informed by the US Federal Bureau of Investigation (FBI) that al-Baghdadi had sexually abused Ms. Mueller, and that Ms. Mueller had also been tortured. Abu Sayyaf's widow, Umm Sayyaf, confirmed that it was her husband who had been Mueller's primary abuser.

In its digital magazine Dabiq, IS explicitly claimed religious justification for enslaving Yazidi women. According to The Wall Street Journal, IS appeals to apocalyptic beliefs and claims "justification by a Hadith that they interpret as portraying the revival of slavery as a precursor to the end of the world". IS appeals to the hadith and Quran when claiming the right to enslave and rape captive non-Muslim women. According to Dabiq, "enslaving the families of the kuffar and taking their women as concubines is a firmly established aspect of the Sharia's that if one were to deny or mock, he would be denying or mocking the verses of the Quran and the narration of the Prophet ... and thereby apostatizing from Islam." Captured Yazidi women and children are divided among the fighters who captured them, with one-fifth taken as a tax. IS has received widespread criticism from Muslim scholars and others in the Muslim world for using part of the Quran to derive a ruling in isolation, rather than considering the entire Quran and hadith. According to Mona Siddiqui, IS's "narrative may well be wrapped up in the familiar language of jihad and 'fighting in the cause of Allah', but it amounts to little more than destruction of anything and anyone who doesn't agree with them"; she describes IS as reflecting a "lethal mix of violence and sexual power" and a "deeply flawed view of manhood". Dabiq describes "this large-scale enslavement" of non-Muslims as "probably the first since the abandonment of Shariah law". In an article in a 2015 issue of the Islamic State magazine Dabiq, (quoted by author Graeme Wood) someone calling herself Umm Summayah al Muhajirah indignantly berated supporters of the Islamic State who had denied the use of slavery by Islamic State:

The [opponents of the Islamic State] dare to extend their tongues with false rumours and accusations so as to disfigure the great Shariah ruling and pure prophetic Sunnah titled "saby" [enslavement of girls]? After all this, saby becomes fornication and tasarri [concubinage] becomes rape? If only we'd heard these falsehoods from the kuffar [infidels] who are ignorant of our religion. Instead we hear it from those associated with our Ummah! So I say in astonishment: Are our people awake or asleep? But what really alarmed me was that some of the Islamic State supporters (may Allah forgive them) rushed to defend the Islamic State [by] denying the matter as if the soldiers of the Khilafah had committed a mistake or evil.

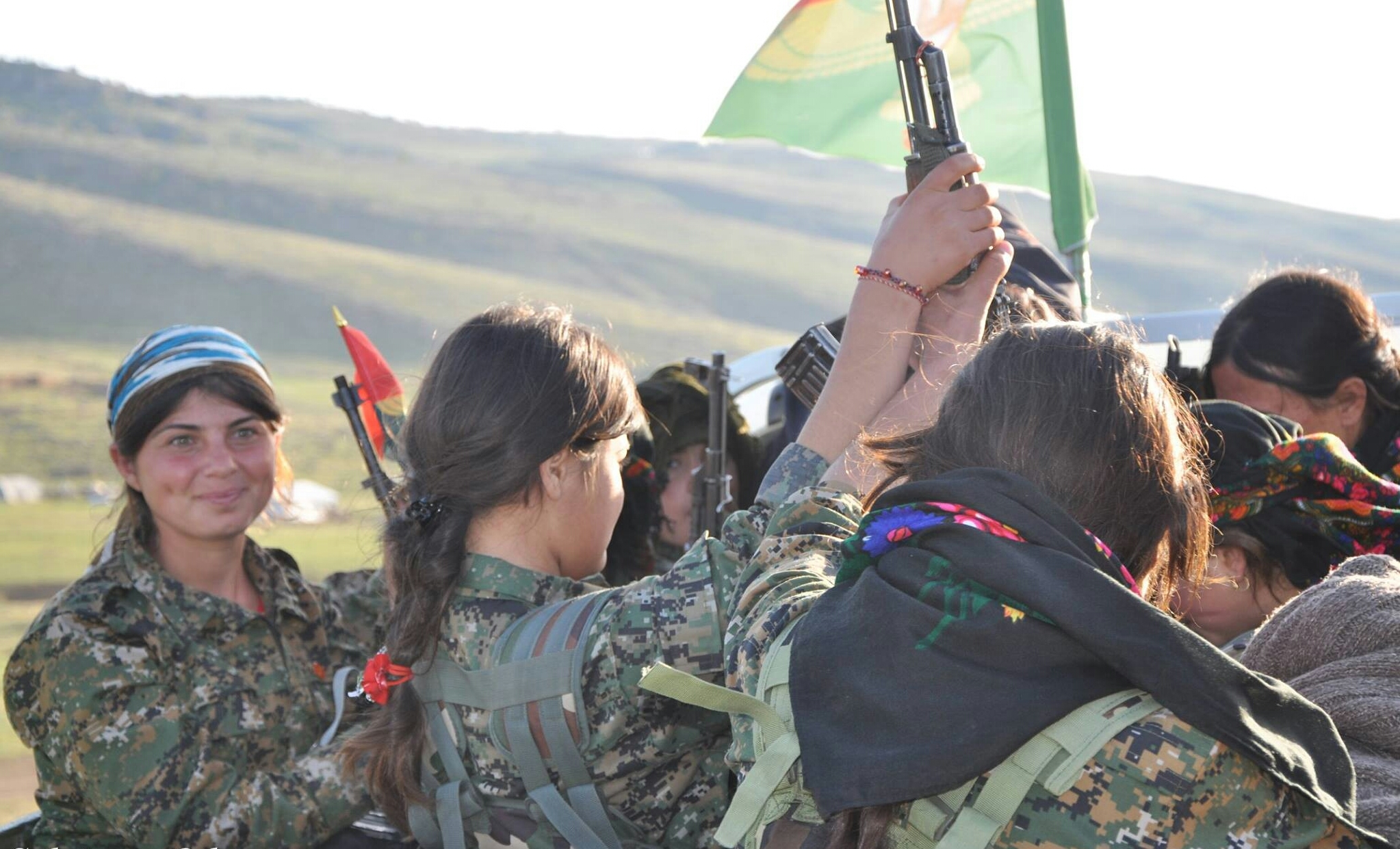
YJÊ are women fighters trained by the Kurdish Workers Party guerillas to defend themselves against Islamist extremists.

In late 2014, IS released a pamphlet that focused on the treatment of female slaves. It claims that the Quran allows fighters to have sex with captives, including adolescent girls, and to beat slaves as discipline. The pamphlet's guidelines also allow fighters to trade slaves, including for sex, as long as they have not been impregnated by their owners. Charlie Winter, a researcher at the counter-extremist think tank Quilliam, described the pamphlet as "abhorrent". In response to this document Abbas Barzegar, a religion professor at Georgia State University, said Muslims around the world find IS's "alien interpretation of Islam grotesque and abhorrent". Muslim leaders and scholars from around the world have rejected the validity of IS's claims, claiming that the reintroduction of slavery is un-Islamic, that they are required to protect "People of the Scripture" including Christians, Jews, Muslims and Yazidis, and that IS's fatwas are invalid due to their lack of religious authority and the fatwas' inconsistency with Islam.

The Independent reported in 2015 that the usage of Yazidi sex slaves had created ongoing friction among fighters within IS. Sajad Jiyad, a Research Fellow and Associate Member at the Iraqi Institute for Economic Reform, told the newspaper that many IS supporters and fighters had been in denial about the trafficking of kidnapped Yazidi women until a Dabiq article justifying the practice was published. The New York Times said in August 2015 that "[t]he systematic rape of women and girls from the Yazidi religious minority has become deeply enmeshed in the organization and the radical theology of the Islamic State in the year since the group announced it was reviving slavery as an institution." The article claims that IS is not merely exonerating but sacralising rape, and illustrated this with the testimony of escapees. One 15-year-old victim said that, while she was being assaulted, her rapist "kept telling me this is ibadah"; a 12-year-old victim related how her assailant claimed that, "by raping me, he is drawing closer to Allah"; and one adult prisoner told how, when she challenged her captor about repeatedly raping a 12 year old, she was met with the retort, "No, she's not a little girl, she's a slave and she knows exactly how to have sex and having sex with her pleases Allah."

In July 2016 it was reported by an AP investigation that IS was using mobile apps like Telegram to sell their sex slaves and identify the slaves of other IS members at checkpoints. In 2016, the Commission for International Justice and Accountability said they had identified 34 senior IS members who were instrumental in the systematic sex slave trade and planned to prosecute them after the end of hostilities.

=== Slave trade ===
The Islamic State announced the revival of slavery as an institution. In 2015, the official prices for slaves which were set by IS were the following:

- Children aged 1 to 9 were sold for 200,000 dinars ($169).
- Women and children 10 to 20 years old for 150,000 dinars ($127).
- Women 20 to 30 years old for 100,000 dinar ($85).
- Women 30 to 40 years old for 75,000 dinar ($63).
- Women 40 to 50 years old for 50,000 dinar ($42).

However, some slaves were sold for as little as a pack of cigarettes. Sex slaves were sold to Saudi Arabia, other Persian Gulf countries and Turkey.

=== Allegations of organ trafficking ===
According to the U.S. government a document obtained by U.S. special forces in a raid in eastern Syria, said that the group's scholars ruled that it was permissible to remove organs from non-Muslim captives, to save the life of a Muslim. The document says that "The apostate's life and organs don't have to be respected and may be taken with impunity." The document seems to define apostate as non-Muslim. Shia Muslim captives may also be endangered by the fatwa, because ISIS do not consider them Muslims. The document also claims IS authorizes the removal of organs from captives even when it may kill them. Iraq has accused the group of harvesting human organs for profit.

=== Exploitation of natural disaster events ===
Islamic State was reported for exploiting the brutally devastating 6 February 2023 Turkey-Syria earthquake event for its apocalyptic propaganda content that considered violating earthquake victim rights, contrary with contemporary sciences (protoscientific oversimplification), verbal "frontier justice" action, "opportunity in adversity" — told it as:

"God's (Allah) rage against Turkey for renounced Sharia laws, replaced it with unbeliever (Kuffar) laws and enforced it, adopted unbeliever lifestyles, declared war against IS and allied with the army of unbelievers (NATO)"

in its propaganda narrative.

== See also ==
- Human rights in Iraq (a disambiguation page about human rights during different eras in the history of Iraq)
- Human rights in Syria (a disambiguation page about human rights during different eras in the history of Syria)
- Children's rights under IS
- Mass executions in IS-occupied Mosul
- My Journey into the Heart of Terror
