= I Was in Raqqa =

2017 book by Hedi Yahmed

I Was in Raqqa (Arabic: كنت في الرقة) (Persian: من در رقه بودم)
- First edition (Arabic)
- Author: Hedi Yahmed
- Translator: Vahid Khazzab (translated to Persian)
- Language: Arabic
- Subject: ISIS, joining the Islamic State (ISIS) in Raqqa and fleeing from it
- Genre: Story, Biography, Memory, War, Politic
- Publisher: In Tunisia: Arabic: دار النقوش العربية; In Iran: Persian: نشر نارگل
- Publication date: 2017 in Arabic; 2018 in Persian
- Publication place: Tunisia
- Pages: 268 in Arabic editition 312 in Persian editition
- ISBN: 9789938072242; Arabic edition: 9789938072242; Persian edition: 9786008199281

I Was in Raqqa is a book about Mohamed Fahem, a former member of the Islamic State (ISIS), written by Hedi Yahmed. Fahem is a Tunisian jihadist who joined ISIS in November 2015.

Fahem spent most of his time in Raqqa, Syria. He later returned to his country. He refutes the description "Islamic terrorism" and considers the acts of ISIS fighters as non-Islamic.

The book was a bestseller in Tunisia and Iran.

== Content ==
The book tells the story of a young Tunisian boy who joined ISIL in Syria and lived and fought for years between them, eventually escaping in January 2016 and settling in Turkey.

The author says his motivation for writing this book, is publishing terrorist acts and killing civilians around the world over the past five years is by ISIS. He communicates with Mohamed Fahem as one of the fighters fleeing ISIL via Internet and then holds meetings in Turkey on October and November 2016. Each session lasts between five and six hours per day. Finally, the memoirs were compiled and published in 2017.

Mohamed Fahem describes his life in this book in detail, he was born in Dortmund, Germany on 23 April 1990, he was in Germany until he was five years old, but his family returns to Nabeul, Tunisia, because of influence of German society. In this book, he recalls his childhood and adolescence, describing how he secretly emigrated from Tunisia and joined ISIS through Istanbul and reached to Tell Abyad in Syria. He described the relationships between soldiers and the lives of those who joined ISIS and boundaries, marriage and organizational hierarchy, ISIL soldiers, captives and the relationship between them and ultimately tells about the wars he has been involved in. The author finally presents the story of his escape from ISIL as the beginning of a new life.

The author has attempted to convey to the reader three main themes: First, the character of Mohamed Fahem, his religion, his relationship with his family and his mother's interest, his relationship with ISIS supporters, his feelings about joining ISIS and his escapades, his teachings, his fears and regrets. Second, there are the issues that concern ISIL: the relationship between ISIL forces, supporters and people joining ISIL, their lifestyle in cities, the injustice, the constant suspicion among them, the despair of soldiers joining ISIS but seeing the surprising truth And the killings that have taken place. Third, exploring the reasons why different people are joining ISIS. The author examines these motives in the life of Mohamed Fahem from childhood until his arrival in Tell Abyad in Syria, such as relationships between extremists religion, extremist society, tyranny under Zine El Abidine Ben Ali president of Tunisia, administrative corruption and security corruption and financial support to those who join to this government.

Other interesting points in this book refer to the media frenzy of ISIL and the horror that it created in the hearts of Syrian soldiers. If the Syrian troops were not influenced by ISIL's media clamor, the casualties of this group were far greater than what happened in the battle for ISIS's occupation of Baiji, Iraq Airport, according to Mohamed Fahem's confess.

One of the points discussed in this book is the story of deaths of 4000 person of ISIL forces due to the brutality of ISIL commanders and the moral problems of senior ISIL officials, as well as the settlement of ISIL accounts with dissidents.

== Translate ==
The book originally was published by the "Dar al-Naqoush al-Arabi Magazine" in Tunisia, in 268 pages on 2017. The cover image of the book is the real image of Mohamed Fahem in military uniform of ISIS. This book was recognized in Tunisia as one of the best-selling books. The author has noted that his book has been translated into French, English and Persian.

The book "I Was in Raqqa" was translated to Persian and published by "Nargol Publications" in 312 pages on 2018. The book at the 31st Tehran International Book Fair became the best-selling book and is now in its second edition.

== See also ==
- My Journey into the Heart of Terror
- The Last Girl (memoir)
- Use of social media by the Islamic State of Iraq and the Levant
- Al-Barakah (ISIL administrative district)
- History of Islamic State of Iraq and the Levant
- Ideology of the Islamic State of Iraq and the Levant
- International reactions to the Islamic State of Iraq and the Levant
