= SDLA =

SDLA may refer to:

- Sindhudesh Liberation Army, a Pakistani group labelled a terrorist organisation
- Social Democratic League of America, a former American political party
- South Dakota Library Association, professional association for librarians in South Dakota
