= Awakening (book) =

2017 book by Nathaniel Frank

Awakening: How Gays and Lesbians Brought Marriage Equality to America
- Cover of the first edition
- Author: Nathaniel Frank
- Language: English
- Subject: History of same-sex marriage in the United States
- Publisher: Belknap Press
- Publication date: 2017
- Publication place: United States
- Media type: Print
- Pages: 424
- ISBN: 978-0-674-73722-8
- Dewey Decimal: 306.76
- LC Class: HQ1034.U5 F73 2017

Awakening: How Gays and Lesbians Brought Marriage Equality to America is a 2017 book about the history of same-sex marriage in the United States by Nathaniel Frank. It was published by Belknap Press, an imprint of Harvard University Press.

== Reviews ==
- Bromberger, Brian (22 June 2017). "Book on marriage fight shares the long view". Bay Area Reporter. Vol. 47, no. 25. pp. 30, 45.
- Graff, E. J. (16 July 2017). "Inside the slow, strategic battle for marriage equality". The Washington Post. p. B6.
- Hart-Brinson, Peter (September 2019). "Reviews". Contemporary Sociology. 48 (5): 538–539. doi:10.1177/0094306119867060o. S2CID 203431161.
- Hommerding, Christopher (January 2019). "Book Reviews and Notices". The Annals of Iowa. 78 (1): 113–114. doi:10.17077/0003-4827.12585.
- Kammerer, Edward (September 2019). "Awakening: How Gays and Lesbians Brought Marriage Equality to America". Law and Politics Book Review. 29 (8): 91–93.
- Kuby, William (January 2019). "Book Reviews". Journal of the History of Sexuality. 28 (1): 154–159. doi:10.7560/JHS28106. S2CID 239296434.
- Lefkovitz, Alison (March–April 2018). "We Do!". The Women's Review of Books. 35 (2): 27–28. ISSN 0738-1433. JSTOR 26433180.
- Osborne, Duncan (8 June 2017). "The Fight for Marriage in Broad, Informed Context". Gay City News. Vol. 16, no. 12. pp. 15, 20.
- Sasko, Claire (25 June 2017). "The road to marriage equality". The Philadelphia Inquirer. p. H09.
- Selig, Diana (9 November 2018). "Arguing in Love". Los Angeles Review of Books.
- Sugarman, Jeffery (2018). "From the Streets to the Altar". American Book Review. 39 (2): 39–40. doi:10.1353/abr.2018.0029. S2CID 149721709.
