= Sofiene Chourabi =

Tunisian journalist and blogger

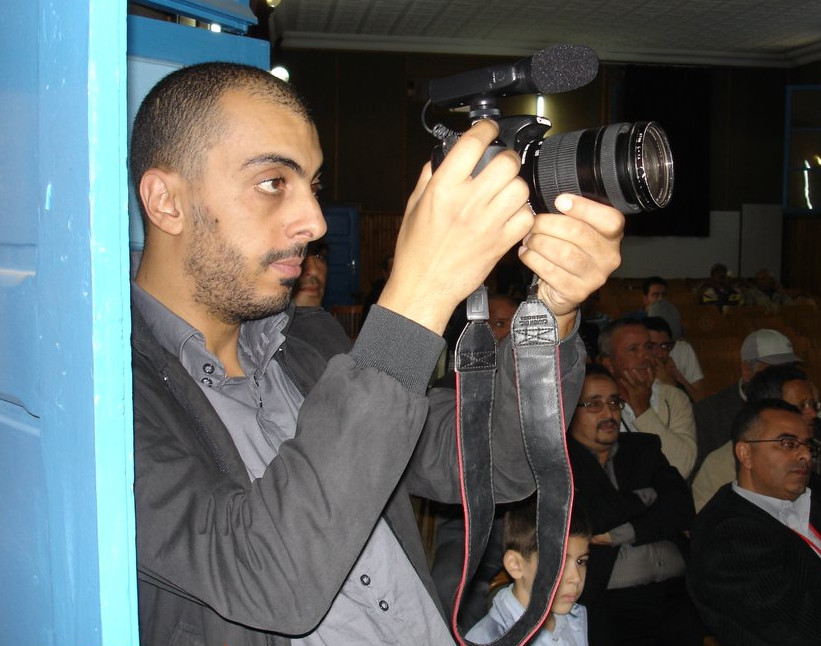
- Sofiene Chourabi in 2012.
- Born: 24 June 1982; Soliman, Tunisia
- Disappeared: 8 September 2014; Ajdabiya, Libya
- Status: Missing for 11 years, 11 months and 11 days
- Occupations: Journalist; activist; Cyber-activist; Blogger

Sofiene Chourabi (Arabic: سفيان الشورابي; born 24 June 1982 in Soliman, Tunisia) is a Tunisian journalist, activist, cyber-activist and blogger, who opposed the regime of Zine El Abidine Ben Ali. On 8 September 2014, he disappeared in Ajdabiya, Libya along with photographer Nadhir Ktari, and their fate remains unknown.

== Biography ==
=== Journalistic career and activity ===
A graduate of the Faculty of Legal, Political and Social Sciences in Tunis, he joined the Ettajdid Movement and became a journalist for its daily newspaper, Attariq Al Jadid. In addition to her articles in Attariq Al Jadid, Sofiene Chourabi continues to criticize the regime of Zine El Abidine Ben Ali through his personal blogs and by becoming an observer for the French channel France 24, which broadcasts her videos and images on police repression during the Tunisian revolution.

After the revolution, he temporarily left journalistic work to join the Higher Authority for Realisation of the Objectives of the Revolution, Political Reform and Democratic Transition and founding the association Conscience politique which aimed to "contribute to education politics of citizens and the improvement of their political consciousness". He also participates in Open Blogging Workshops to promote alternative media and citizen journalism. Sofiene Chourabi returned to journalism by working as a columnist for the Nessma television channel then on the information site of the Institute for War and Peace Reporting. In 2014, he joined the new television channel First TV and hosted the show Doussiyet.

=== Departure for Libya and disappearance ===
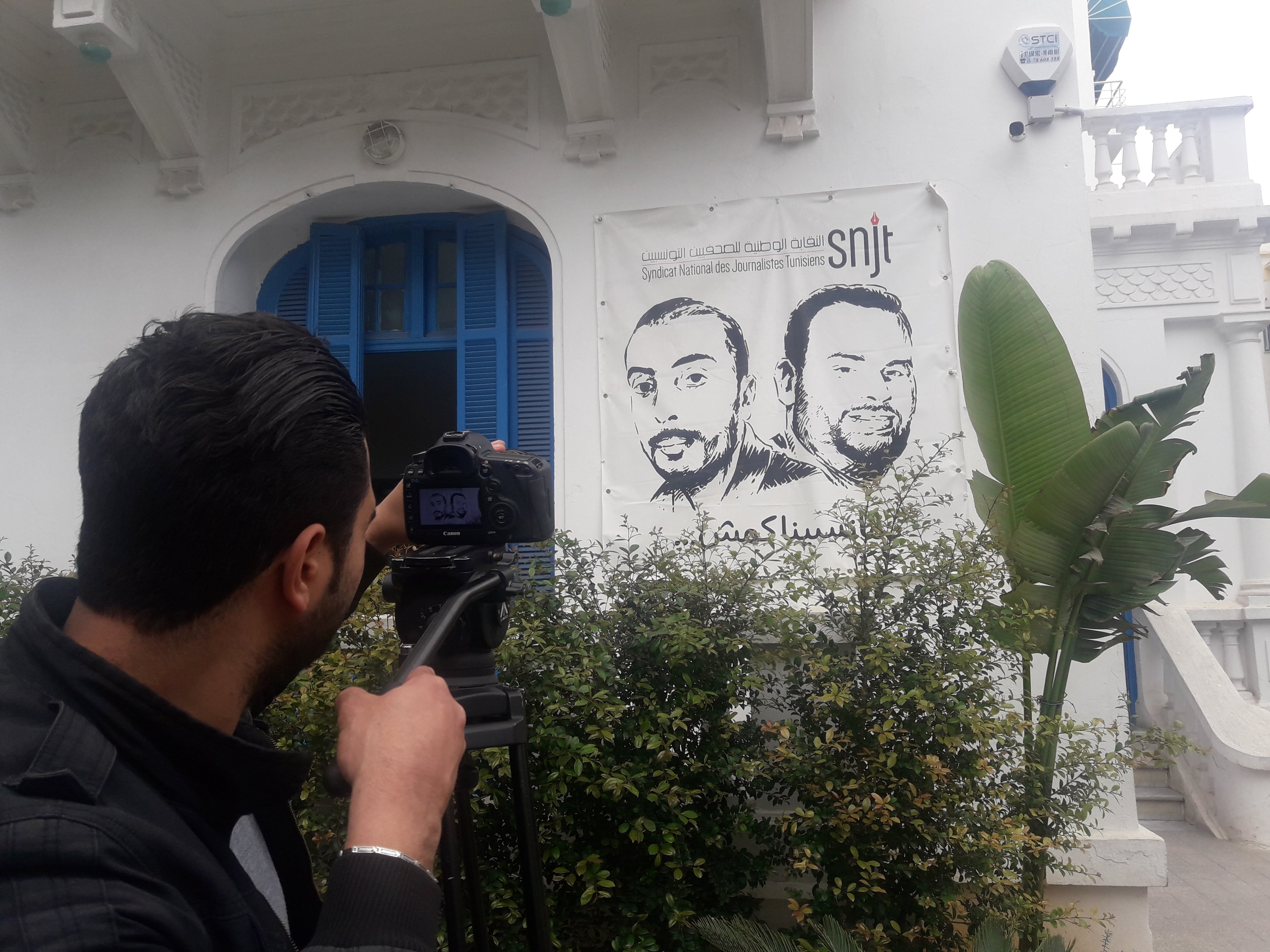
Poster of Chourabi and Ktari at the National Syndicate of Tunisian Journalists headquarters.

As part of his work with First TV, in September 2014 he decided to leave with photographer Nadhir Ktari for Libya to produce a report, but they were both kidnapped by a militia near the Ajdabiya region on 8 September. Since then, their fate remains unknown. On 8 January 2015, the Islamic State announced that it had executed Chourabi and Ktari. However, Tunisian Interior Minister Mohamed Najem Gharsalli claimed in April that the two men were still alive.

On April 29, the Libyan site Bawabat Al Wassat announced that an official from the Libyan Ministry of Justice confirmed the death of a team from the Barqa TV channel and two Tunisian journalists. According to the same site, the Libyan National Army arrested five individuals who confirmed the assassination. On 7 January 2017, a Libyan television channel broadcast the testimony of a jihadist captured by the Libyan army in which he confirmed the execution of the two journalists and specified that Chourabi had his throat slit and that Ktari was shot dead in a forest, after their death sentence by an Islamic State court in Derna. On 18 March 2021, the Kapitalis website claims that the two journalists are alive and imprisoned in Libya. On 24 March, the El Hiwar Et Tounsi television channel claimed that the two journalists were on their way to Tunisia, based on information provided by Nadhir Ktari's mother.

== Arrest ==
On 5 August 2012, he was arrested by the police for drunkenness and indecency, an arrest condemned by Amnesty International and the journalist's entourage, who saw this arrest as punishment due to his criticism of Jebali Cabinet. Not having lost his opponent's reflex, Chourabi did not stop criticizing the Troika government, calling for demonstrations against it a few days before his arrest. He was finally sentenced to pay a fine of 104 dinars.

== Awards ==
- Omar Ourtilane international prize by El Khabar: 2011

== See also ==
- Human rights in Islamic State-controlled territory
