= The Day Ends Like Any Day =

2017 novel by Timothy Ogene

First edition (publ. Holland House)

The Day Ends Like Any Day (Holland House Books, 2017) is a coming-of-age novel by Nigerian poet and novelist Timothy Ogene. Excerpts appeared in One Throne Magazine and The Missing Slate.

== Reviews ==
"Timothy Ogene's beautiful novel is a new form of Bildungsroman: Sam's story is also a journey through books and memories, so much so that a life's journey is not only oriented forwards, but also backwards." — African Book Review

"Sensitive, incisive, compelling and moving, this unusual fictional memoir lingers in the reader’s mind, breaking through our usual reluctance to face the troubling questions it embodies."— LitNet

"A refreshing increase in Nigerian literature in recent years – of which this is a welcome contribution . . .." — Hong Kong Review of Books

"Timothy Ogene’s The Day Ends Like Any Day illustrates the ways in which human beings carry their pasts with them no matter where they go. It is a powerful novel that demands reconciliation, from the reader and its protagonist alike." — Foreword Reviews

'Timothy Ogene's The Day Ends Like Any Day is . . . a lyrical, vibrant, and challenging coming-of-age account of the multiple identities and multiple personalities of a young Nigerian growing up in a period when everything around him is changing but who refuses to accept that his life has been formed by the traumas and dependencies of his life and past.' — Africa Book Link

'Timothy Ogene's beautiful novel is "a new form of Bildungsroman," in which the theme of coming of age becomes a coming of language: Sam's story is also a journey through books and memories, so much so that a life's journey is not only oriented forwards, but also backwards.' — Daily Trust, Nigeria
