= Children's rights under the Islamic State =

The terrorist group the Islamic State (IS) has committed several fundamental violations of children's rights in the Middle East, particularly in Iraq and Syria The conventions protecting children's rights is the United Nations Convention on the Rights of the Child (CRC). This is the most ratified international human rights treaty in history which established the widely supported view that children and young persons have the same basic general human rights as adults and also specific rights that recognize their special needs. A further two additional protocols were adopted by the UN General Assembly on 25 May 2000 covering the involvement of children in armed conflict and on the sale of children, child prostitution and child pornography. In IS's rise in the recent years, they have committed various violations of the (CRC) and its protocols, which have been signed and ratified by Iraq and Syria.

== Islamic State not a party to Conventions ==
IS has been accepted as a sufficiently organized non-State armed group to be considered as a party to the non-international armed conflicts in Iraq and the Syrian Arab Republic and the situations in both countries amount to armed conflicts of a non-international character. International humanitarian law is applicable to armed conflicts of a non-international character thus applicable to both Iraq and the Syrian Republic. All parties to the conflict which include IS are thus bound by common article 3 of Geneva Conventions. This establishes the minimum standards relating to the treatment and protection of civilians, those no longer actively participating in the hostilities and civilian objects. IS currently controls large areas of territory in which millions of individuals live and it has declared itself a “State” which runs both a civil and a military administration including the establishment of a “court” system. Having these in place, the threshold for IS to be bound by human rights obligations has clearly been met and so, at the very least, IS is bound under international law to respect core human rights obligations, such as the right to life, the absolute prohibition of torture, cruel, inhuman and degrading treatment, the prohibition of slavery and the prohibition of enforced disappearance, as well as the right to freedom of thought, conscience and religion. Furthermore, Iraq and The Syrian Arab Republic are parties to major human rights treaties and various optional protocols. It has been established that in situations of armed conflict, international human rights law continues to apply and both international human rights law and international humanitarian law frameworks will act together in a mutually reinforcing way.

== Violations ==
=== Children's right to life ===
The right to life is a fundamental inherent right of all children, established in Article 6 of the CRC. The constant attacks by IS in Iraq and Syria violate this fundamental right by causing the deaths of hundreds of children. In Iraq, the United Nations reported that killing and maiming continue to be the violations that most affect children. Since 2014, there has been a significant increase in violence which resulted in a conservative estimation of 1,256 children killed and 1,831 children injured as a result of the conflict-related violence from 1 January 2014 to the end of April 2015. In 2014 to 2015, the counter-IS operations had intensified resulting in significant increase in documented child casualties due to the clashes between parties to the conflict. Of these documented attacks, it has been alleged that more than half are results of attacks using tactics of extreme violence by IS. Also reported was the systematic killing of children belonging religious and ethnic minorities by IS, including numerous cases of mass execution of boys. In Syria, the United Nations has limited capacity to verify information in the areas under the control of IS. There have been reports regarding the execution of children in Hasakah, Raqqah and Dayr Az-Zawr. An estimated one-fifth of child casualties are caused by vehicle-borne improvised explosive devices and suicide attacks by IS. In April 2014, 69 children were killed and injured in a double improvised explosive device attack in a government-controlled neighbourhood of Homs. The violent attacks by IS have been in violation of the international Human Rights and Humanitarian laws.

=== Recruitment and use of children in armed conflict ===
This act is prohibited under various international treaties and conventions such as Article 77.2 of the Additional Protocol I to the Geneva Conventions, Optional Protocol to the Convention on the Rights of the Child on the involvement of children in armed conflict, Article 4.3.c of Protocol II, additional to the Geneva Conventions and International Labour Organisation's Worst Forms of Child Labour Convention. In summary, they condemn and prohibit the recruitment of children under the age of 18. In 2014 alone, it was verified by the United Nations at least 67 cases of boys being recruited by IS and these numbers are not likely to reflect the actual scope of child recruitment. From August 2014 to 2015, it has been reported that hundreds of boys were forcibly taken from their homes in NInawa and sent to training centers, where boys as young as the age of 8 received weapons training and combat tactics. In addition, in early February 2015, IS imposed compulsory recruitment of children in the Rutba district. In Syria, there have been reports of significant increase in the recruitment of young boys. Furthermore, IS has reportedly established 3 training camps in Raqqa and have imprisoned hundreds of boys as young as 10 at Aleppo forcing on to them indoctrinated seminars with promised rewards of salaries, a martyr's place in paradise and "gift" of wife upon joining IS. These violations by IS are war crimes and in breach of fundamental human rights they are required to uphold.

=== Slavery and sexual violence ===
This act is prohibited by international human rights law in instruments such as the CRC, art 34, 37 and 39 and Optional Protocol to the Convention on the Rights of the Child on the sale of children, child prostitution and child pornography. Article 1 provides that "States Parties shall prohibit the sale of children, child prostitution and child pornography as provided for by the present Protocol." The rise of IS has led to an increase in reported violations of sexual violence committed against children, particularly girls. These violations are likely to be under reported due to security and access constraints by the United Nations and fear of repercussions by the girls. In one of the reported cases, on 6 August 2014, In Sinjar district over 400 Yezidi women and girls were abducted by IS and sent to two IS-controlled areas, Ghabat al-Mosul and Tal Afar (Ninawa) where they were later forced into sexual slavery. The Office of the United Nations High Commissioner for Human Rights later verified "clear patterns of sexual violence against Yezidi women and girls, including rape and sexual slavery committed by IS in clear violation of international human rights law. In Syria, similar to Iraq, it is difficult to obtain reliable data on the conflict-related sexual violence in IS-controlled domains as well as fear of stigma and reprisals by the victims. The abducted women and girls, in the attacks on Sinjar in August 2014, were reported to have been taken to Syrian Arab Republic and "sold" in the markets across Raqqa to be used as sex slaves.

=== The freedom of thought, conscience and religion ===
Children have the right to freedom of thought, conscience and religion which are core human rights, established in several international conventions such as articles 13 - 17 of the CRC. IS has used education as a tool for indoctrination for the purposes of creating a new generation of supporters. In Raqqah, children are gathered to watch screenings of videos showing mass executions of Government soldiers. Its purpose is to desensitize them to extreme violence. In May 2014, there was an abduction of 153 Kurdish boys, aged between 14 –16 years by IS. They imprisoned them in the a school in Aleppo and screened videos of beheading and attacks and forced them it a daily instruction on militant ideology for a 5-month period. Those who disagreed were punished with severe beatings. The corroboration of the testimonies collected report that IS intends to subjugate children under their control and dominate every aspect of their lives through terror, indoctrination, and provision of services to those who will conform. Their use of surveillance, coercion, fear and punishment are used to prevent any form of disagreement.

== Accountability ==
=== Who enforces ===
Accountability for all serious or gross violations of international human rights law and international humanitarian law is essential to ensure justice, provide redress to the victims and prevent future infringements. The Governments of Iraq and Syrian Arab Republic have the responsibility to protect the individuals under their jurisdiction and ensuring justice and accountability in acts of grave crimes. Domestic courts in Iraq and Syrian Arab Republic have jurisdiction over all violations committed within their territories whether by nationals or foreigners. However, as there have been concerns regarding the judicial systems in both Iraq and the Syrian Arab Republic, the United Nations High Commissioner for Human Rights urged the involvement of the International Criminal Court. Its main purpose for intervention would be to investigate and prosecute the crimes allegedly committed by IS. As neither Iraq nor the Syrian Arab Republic are parties to the Rome Statute, the Court has no territorial jurisdiction over the crimes committed in their territory. In the Special Rapporteur report in 2015, the Special Rapporteur called on the Governments of Iraq and the Syrian Arab Republic to become parties without delay to the Rome Statute and to accept the jurisdiction of the Court over the current situation under article 12 (3).

== See also ==
- Children in the military
- Human rights in the Islamic State
- Convention on the Rights of the Child
