= Seesaw (Ogene novel) =

2021 novel by Timothy Ogene

Seesaw is the second novel by Timothy Ogene. It was published in London in November 2021 by Swift Press, and was reviewed in The Guardian, The Times, Unherd, Isele Magazine, and Writers Mosaic. Excerpts appeared in Granta and The Johannesburg Review of Books. It can be considered as a classic road novel and, at the same time, a satire; the voice of an unreliable narrator depicts American culture and politics as seen through the eyes of a Nigerian scholar visiting Boston.
