= I Am a Cat (Bernstein book) =

2017 children's picture book by Galia Bernstein

- Author: Galia Bernstein
- Illustrator: Galia Bernstein
- Language: English
- Genre: Children's picture book
- Published: 2017 (Abrams Books for Young Readers)
- Publication place: Australia
- Media type: Print (hardback)
- Pages: 32
- ISBN: 9781419726439
- OCLC: 987155992

I Am a Cat is a 2017 children's picture book by Galia Bernstein. It is about a tabby cat called Simon who persuades some big cats that he is a cat, just like them.

== Publication history ==
- 2018, USA, Abrams Books ISBN 9781419726439
- 2017, Australia, Abrams Books for Young Readers ISBN 9781419726439

== Reception ==
In a starred review of I Am a Cat Publishers Weekly wrote "Bernstein’s debut is a fresh, powerful twist on the tension between in-groups and out-groups."

Other reviews of I Am a Cat appear in Booklist, School Library Journal, Kirkus Reviews, The Bulletin of the Center for Children's Books, The Wall Street Journal, and the Chicago Tribune.

It is a 2019-20 Prairie Bud winner.
