= The Graybar Hotel =

2017 short story collection about prison life by Curtis Dawkins

The Graybar Hotel: Stories
- The front cover of the first edition (hardcover)
- Author: Curtis Dawkins
- Language: English
- Genre: Short stories
- Publisher: Scribner
- Publication date: July 4, 2017
- Publication place: United States
- Media type: Print (hardback), e-book, audiobook
- Pages: 224
- ISBN: 978-1-5011-6229-9
- OCLC: 961009480

The Graybar Hotel is the debut collection of short stories about prison life by Curtis Dawkins, that was first published on July 4, 2017 by Scribner. Dawkins himself is a convicted murderer, serving a life sentence without parole at the Lakeland Correctional Facility in Michigan.

== Background ==
Curtis Dawkins grew up in Louisville, Illinois, and earned a Master of Fine Arts from Western Michigan University in 2000. On October 31, 2004, Dawkins shot a man dead and held another hostage while under the influence of crack cocaine. In 2005 he was convicted of felony murder and sentenced to life imprisonment without the possibility of parole.

== Development ==
While in quarantine awaiting his prison assignment, Dawkins wrote down the first line of his short story "County", inspired by his experience being incarcerated in the Kalamazoo County jail. Dawkins began writing in prison, explaining: "A part of me realized, if I'm going to live through this, I'm going to have to find a purpose." He used an electric typewriter to write short stories and mailed them to his sister who submitted his work to literary magazines. A few of Dawkins' stories were published in less-well-known journals, and in 2016, a selection of his short stories eventually came to the attention of a literary agent who took Dawkins on as a client. Dawkins' stories were then sold to American publisher Scribner for a six-figure advance, with Dawkins' share going to an education fund for his children.

== Stories ==
Most of the fourteen stories in The Graybar Hotel are first-person narratives by an unnamed prisoner. The stories appear in the following sequence:

- "County"
- "A Human Number"
- "Sunshine"
- "Daytime Drama"
- "The Boy Who Dreamed Too Much"
- "573543"
- "In the Dayroom with Stinky"
- "Swans"
- "The World Out There"
- "Six Pictures of a Fire at Night"
- "Depakote Mo"
- "Brother Goose"
- "Engulfed"
- "Leche Quemada"

== Reception ==
Reactions to the publication of The Graybar Hotel have been divided. Dawkins' editor acknowledged that "some people have been scared off by his circumstances and have mixed feelings about supporting somebody who's committed the kind of crime that he has." Novelist Nickolas Butler was initially conflicted about endorsing the book, but eventually did so after being convinced of Dawkins' remorse. The younger brother of Dawkins' victim objected to the publication of the book, saying: "I don't think [Dawkins] should have the right to publish anything."

=== Critical response ===
Early reviews were generally positive. Kirkus Reviews described The Graybar Hotel as a "well-turned and surprising addition to prison literature." Publishers Weekly was impressed with the book's "authenticity of real-life experience", noting that Dawkins' "prose is rich in metaphor and imagery". Reviewing Dawkins' book for the Houston Chronicle, Joseph Peschel concluded that: "His prison stories are insightful and well written, and they ring true. Dawkins possesses the acquired wisdom of a man who's been there, done that and, unfortunately, is staying there."

== See also ==
- American prison literature
