= International reactions to the Islamic State =

The International reactions to ISIL has widely been condemnation and declaration as a terrorist group, however, there have been pockets of support for the group shown in opinion polling in July 2014 conducted at the request of the Russian state news agency Rossiya Segodnya by ICM Research in the United Kingdom, France, and Germany. Further support arises from factions of Al Qaeda, and other radical elements both inside and out of governments.

== International reactions ==
=== Europe ===
==== Germany ====
Germany launched on August 15, 2014 relief flights into Iraq. Four Bundeswehr aircraft brought 36 tonnes of medical supplies and food according to Erbil. So-called defensive armaments were not on board in the first transport. The Federal Government had in principle agreed to provide Unimog vehicles, vests or helmets. German Chancellor Angela Merkel was initially reluctant to German arms shipments to Kurdish units or the government army. She made clear, however, that this must be an option. [187] At European level, the foreign ministers' meeting on August 15 in Brussels, with the participation of Frank-Walter Steinmeier paved the way in this direction. [188] On the 20th August precipitated the Federal Government a policy decision that one Islamic State if necessary the struggle of the Kurds in northern Iraq against the Jihadist Group - with the participation of the Bundestag -.'ll also assist with weapons [189] the end of August 2014, the Federal Government decided to supply grenades, assault rifles and ammunition, and support the Iraqi Kurds. [190] In mid-August 2014, several major cities such as Hannover [191] and Frankfurt [192] hosted demonstrations against the Islamic State.

=== Muslim world ===
Worldwide, Muslims distanced from IS. In June 2014, stated Organization of Islamic Cooperation, that the practices of the IS had nothing to do with Islam. [193] In August 2014, the Council of the Organization of Islamic scholars was in Indonesia for " haram "(forbidden) states. [194] The Supreme Mufti of Saudi Arabia Abd al-Aziz bin Abdullah Al al-Sheikh noted that the IS with its crimes in the Middle East would violate Islamic principles and teachings, and described him as "enemy number one" of Islam. [ 195] The Egyptian Grand Mufti Schawki Ibrahim Allam marked the IS as a threat to Islam and the Muslims, because he would destroy and corrupt the image of Islam, [196] saying IS the right from, call themselves "Islamic State", and urged the media you to designate IS only as "Al-Qaeda separatists in Iraq and Syria". [197] The Central Council of Muslims in Germany said the expulsion of Christians is against Islam. [198] The Islamic Religious Community in Austria verlautbarte that IS not have the right to represent the Muslim faith. [199] The Turkish culture community in Austria gave the IS against the abuse of Islam. [200] The Islamic Society of North America (Islamic Society of North America) condemned the attacks of IS as "un-Islamic". [201] The Gulf Cooperation Council condemned the end of August the atrocities of all those who accept Islam as an excuse to murder and distribution. [202] In early September enacted UK's leading imams a fatwa prohibiting Muslims who poisoned ideology to support the IS: IS is a heretical extremist organization, and it is religiously forbidden (haram) to support them or to join it. Furthermore, it is a duty for British Muslims, this poisonous ideology actively oppose, especially when it is used in the UK. [203] [204] [205]

Away from these official statements presented Muslim intellectuals in the Saudi and other Arab societies not inconsiderable sympathy for ideology and terror of the IS fixed. [206] The Nigerian -sunnitische terrorist organization Boko Haram says the IS support. [207]

==== Al Qaeda ====
Relations between the ISIL with Al-Qaeda, led since death of Osama bin Laden by Ayman al-Zawahiri, are ambiguous. While some local branches of al-Qaeda in Syria and Iraq have sworn allegiance to ISIL, the two movements have become rivals.

On 9 April 2013, Abu Bakr al-Baghdadi said that the al-Nosra Front is a branch of the Islamic State of Iraq and Syria, he announced the merger of EII and Frente al-Nosra to form an Islamic State in Iraq and the Levant. But al-Nosra leader, Abu Mohammad al-Joulani, although he acknowledged having fought in Iraq under his command and to have benefited from his help in Syria, do not respond favorably to the appeal of al- Baghdadi and renews its allegiance to Ayman al-Zawahiri, emir of Al-Qaeda.

In June and November 2013, Ayman al-Zawahiri calls on the ISIS to renounce its claims on Syria, saying that Abu Bakr al-Baghdadi, "made a mistake by establishing ISIS" without him having asked permission or even informing. He announced that: "The Islamic State in Iraq and Syria (ISIS) will be removed, so that the Islamic State in Iraq (ISI) remains operational. " For al-Zawahiri, the al-Nosra Front remains the only al-Qaeda branch in Syria.

In turn, al-Baghdadi rejects the statements of al-Zawahiri. In reality, ISIL considers itself an independent state and no one wants to pay any allegiance to Al Qaeda, or any other structure.

Differences also oppose Al Qaeda and ISIL: first consider the jihad must be conducted primarily against the United States, Israel, Western countries and their regional allies; meanwhile, since the departure of the Americans from Iraq, ISIL considers that the main enemy is now the Iran and Shiites.

In 2014, however, Al-Qaeda and ISIL conflict directly. On January 6, Syrian rebels revolted against the ISIL, and al-Nosra Front, the Syrian branch of Al-Qaeda, taking part in the offensive, mainly Racca. Al-Julani, Al Nosra leader, believes that ISIL has a strong responsibility for the outbreak of the conflict, but calls for a cease-fire. But the 11 or January 12 at Racca, the ISIL executes 99 prisoners members of al-Nosra Front and Ahrar al-Sham according to OSDH.

On 2 February 2014, Al-Qaeda published a statement in which he condemned the actions of the ISIL and confirms that the movement "is not an al-Qaeda branch, has no organizational connection" with them and that it "is not responsible for his actions".

On April 4, 2014, Ayman al-Zawahiri calls for an "independent arbitration under Islamic law" to end the fighting between Syria's Islamic State of Iraq and the Levant and Jabhat al-Nosra. According to Romain Caillet, researcher at the French Institute of the Middle East and specialist in the Salafist movement, the project supported by al-Zawahiri would result form a single legal proceeding, placed above all others. The authority of the EIIL the territories it controls, would be dissolved. This is the main reason why ISIL, who sees himself as a real state, rejects this solution and prefers the so-called "joint courts," where the jury would be composed half of members ISIL and the Another brigade of the complainant.

On May 2, 2014, Ayman al-Zawahiri instructs the Front al-Nosra to stop fighting other jihadist groups and "devote themselves to fight against the enemies of Islam, namely the Baathists, the Shiites and their allies. " He also called Abu Bakr al-Baghdadi, the head of ISIL to focus on Iraq. These instructions are not followed, in the same period, the Battle of Al-Busayrah ensues between al-Nosra and ISIL near Deir ez-Zor.

On May 12, Abu Mohammed al-Adnani, Chief ISIL Syria, calls posts by Ayman al-Zawahiri of "unreasonable, unrealistic and illegitimate" . He tells it in a recording: "You have caused the mujahedeen sadness and exultation of their enemy by supporting the traitor (Abu Mohammad al-Joulani, leader of al-Nosra). Sheikh Osama (that is to say, Osama bin Laden, the former leader of Al-Qaeda) had gathered all the mujahideen with one word, but you have divided and torn. [...] You are the cause of the quarrel, you must terminate."

==== Opinion polling ====
In July 2014, a survey was conducted at the request of the Russian state news agency Rossiya Segodnya by ICM Research (in) the United Kingdom, in France and Germany. The following question is asked of 3,007 people, including 1,000 in the UK, 1,006 in France, 1,001 in Germany : "From what you know, tell us if you have a very favorable opinion, quite favorable, somewhat unfavorable or very unfavorable to the Islamic State in Iraq and the Levant, also known as Isis'.

In the UK, 2% of respondents say they have a very favorable opinion of IE, 5% somewhat favorable, 20% unfavorable enough, 44% very opposite, 29% do not know the group. In France, 3% of respondents say they have a very favorable opinion of IE, 13% somewhat favorable, 31% unfavorable enough, 31% very opposite, 23% did not know the group. Furthermore, according to the same survey, 27% of 18-24 years have a favorable opinion (ie very favorable or somewhat favorable) of IE. In Germany, 0% of respondents say they have a very favorable opinion of IE, 2% somewhat favorable, 28% unfavorable enough, 54% very opposite, 16% do not know the group. Yuri Rubinsky, director of the Center for French Studies at the Institute of Europe (Russian Academy of Sciences), believes that these numbers are directly related to the presence of North African and Middle Eastern origin populations in these countries, particularly in France, which has the largest Muslim population in Europe.

=== Designation as a terrorist organization ===
Organisation	Date	Faction	References
Multinational organisations
United Nations	18 October 2004 (as al-Qaeda in Iraq); 30 May 2013 (after separation from al‑Qaeda)	United Nations Security Council	
European Union	2004	EU Council (via adoption of UN al-Qaida Sanctions List)	
Nations
United Kingdom	March 2001 (as part of al-Qaeda); 20 June 2014 (after separation from al‑Qaeda)	Home Secretary of the Home Office	
United States	17 December 2004 (as al-Qaeda in Iraq)	United States Department of State	
Australia	2 March 2005 (as al-Qaeda in Iraq); 14 December 2013 (after separation from al‑Qaeda)	Attorney-General for Australia	
Canada	20 August 2012	Parliament of Canada	
Turkey	30 October 2013	Grand National Assembly of Turkey	
Saudi Arabia	7 March 2014	Royal decree of the King of Saudi Arabia	
Indonesia	1 August 2014	National Counter-terrorism Agency BNPT	
United Arab Emirates	20 August 2014	United Arab Emirates Cabinet	
Malaysia	24 September 2014	Ministry of Foreign Affairs	
Egypt	30 November 2014	The Cairo Court for Urgent Matters	
India	16 December 2014	Ministry of Home Affairs	
Russia	29 December 2014	Supreme Court of Russia	
Kyrgyzstan	25 March 2015	Kyrgyz State Committee of National Security	
Syria			

Also media sources worldwide have described ISIL as a terrorist organization.
