= Tell Me Everything You Don't Remember =

Memoir of a 33 year old stroke victim

Tell Me Everything You Don't Remember: The Stroke That Changed My Life
- Author: Christine Hyung-Oak Lee
- Language: English
- Genre: Nonfiction; Autobiography (Memoir)
- Published: February 14, 2017(Ecco/ Harper Collins)
- Publication place: United States
- Media type: Print (hardcover)
- Pages: 272

Tell Me Everything You Don't Remember: The Stroke That Changed My Life is a book by Christine Hyung-Oak Lee, published in 2017. Lee suffered a stroke at the age of 33. She explains her symptoms, realization, hospital experience, and the recovery process of the incident and trauma. The book is an expansion of a personal essay initially written for Buzzfeed.

== Author ==
Christine Hyung-Oak Lee was born in New York City. She earned her undergraduate degree at UC Berkeley and Master of Fine Arts at Mills College. Lee has written novels and several short stories/essays for The New York Times, Buzzfeed, and Guernica. She is a Distinguished Visiting Writer at Saint Mary's College of California and the editor at The Rumpus. Lee was awarded a Hedgebrook residency and her writing was nominated for a Pushcart Prize.

== Synopsis ==
On December 31, 2006, Lee woke up with an immense headache which she didn't know at that time was a stroke. Not thinking much about it, Lee and her husband, Adam, were running some errands when she experienced a cascade of sensory input and she felt dizzy. Once she got home, Lee took a nap, which is not recommended after or during a stroke. Waking up from a dream, she realizes that she lost her voice and her words. At that time she noted that her symptoms were not those of a stroke, as she could still smile and her words were not slurred. Instead, her balance was off, vision was unclear, lost her words, and encountered a tremendous headache. When Lee understands the severity, she tries to call 911 but is unable to remember the number. She ends up calling her husband unknowingly and they go to the emergency room.

At the hospital, Lee takes a memory test and has a CT scan done. The results display a dark spot and the neurologist thinks she has vasculitis. An MRI was done the next morning and Dr. Volpi concluded that she had a left thalamic stroke. The stroke damaged her left thalamus which in turn affects the right. Christine Lee had a hole/flap called patent foramen ovale (PFO) in her heart which was an undiagnosed birth defect. This created a blood clot that went through her body and made its way into her brain. The doctor determined this cause with a bubble test and echocardiogram.

The stroke destroyed her short-term memory so Lee documented everything that happened in her notebook. This was her source of remembering who she spoke with and what the doctor was saying. After 10 days at the hospital, Lee was sent home with medicine for thinning her blood and blood tests to be done three times a week to determine the clotting tendency of her blood. Lee states how drastically the stroke has affected every aspect of her life from reading a book to cooking pasta. After some time, Lee gets a clot again and goes to the emergency room where the cardiologist decided to close the hole in her heart a week later with an Amplazter device.

The recovery process was long and exhausting. Lee gradually increased activities such as reading a magazine to a short story after six months. She wrote in her journal and blogged which displayed her stroke recovery and created connections. Lee re-enrolled in her Master in Fine Arts program. She is able to exercise such as yoga and running because the hole in her heart was closed. She was able to get fit and pregnant after the surgery. Lee states that a part of her brain will be forever dead but retelling the story has assisted in mending her mind and coming to terms with her true self.

== Reception ==
The book was reviewed by The New York Times, Kirkus, and Business Insider.
