= Stack the Cats =

Children's picture book by Susie Ghahremani

- Author: Susie Ghahremani
- Illustrator: Susie Ghahremani
- Language: English
- Genre: Children's picture book
- Published: 2017 (Abrams Appleseed)
- Publication place: USA
- Media type: Print (hardback)
- Pages: 32 (unpaginated)
- ISBN: 9781419723490
- OCLC: 1042848130

Stack the Cats is a 2017 children's picture book written and illustrated by Susie Ghahremani. It is a counting book involving cats.

== Reception ==
Stack the Cats received starred reviews from Kirkus Reviews writing "Thanks to its gentle inconsistencies, this is a book that can expand children’s thought processes.", and Booklist that found it a "sneaky counting lesson".

Ghahremani's cat illustrations have been compared to Neko Atsume, and to Pusheen.

Stack the Cats has also been reviewed by Publishers Weekly, School Library Journal, Horn Book Guides, and The Bulletin of the Center for Children's Books.

It is a 2018 CCBC Choices book
