= Lulu Gets a Cat =

Children's picture book by Anna McQuinn and Rosalind Beardshaw

- Author: Anna McQuinn
- Illustrator: Rosalind Beardshaw
- Cover artist: Rosalind Beardshaw
- Language: English
- Genre: Children's picture book
- Published: 2017 (Alanna Max)
- Publication place: England
- Media type: Print (hardback)
- Pages: 32 (unpaginated)
- ISBN: 9781907825163
- OCLC: 1023363898

Lulu Gets a Cat is a 2017 children's picture book by Anna McQuinn and illustrated by Rosalind Beardshaw. It is about a little girl called Lulu who wants a cat, shows her initially reluctant mother that she is ready by reading about cats at the library and treating her toy cat Dinah as if it is real, and then adopts a cat who she calls Makeda.

== Publication history ==
- Lola Gets a Cat, 2017, USA, Charlesbridge Publishing ISBN 9781580897365
- Lulu Gets a Cat, 2017, England, Alanna Max ISBN 9781907825163

== Reception ==
A review by Booktrust of Lulu Gets a Cat wrote "The bright illustrations are colourful and clear, perfect for even the youngest readers and cat enthusiasts. The text is short and simple, and would be great for independent reading practice", and Horn Book Guides called it a "simple, sweet story".

Lulu Gets a Cat has also been reviewed by Kirkus Reviews, Booklist, School Library Journal, and Children's Books Ireland.

It is a 2018 North Somerset Teachers' Book Award shortlisted book, and a 2018 Empathy Lab Recommended Book.
