= One Throne Magazine =

Online literary magazine

- Editor: Dan Dowhal, George Filipovic
- Categories: literary magazine
- First issue: 2014; 12 years ago
- Final issue: Winter 2015
- Country: Canada
- Based in: Dawson City, Yukon
- Language: English
- Website: www.onethrone.com
- ISSN: 2369-8055

One Throne Magazine was an online literary magazine (all genres) that published poetry, short stories, and creative nonfiction. The magazine was founded at Dawson City, Canada, in 2014. Its editors were Dan Dowhal and George Filipovic. The magazine is currently on an indefinite hiatus. It was last updated in Winter 2015.

One Throne issues featured between six and 12 pieces of writing and an equal number of pieces of visual art. The magazine had two of its stories from its first year deemed "notable" by The Best American Series. It appeared on Duotrope's lists of "25 Most Challenging Fiction Markets" and "25 Most Challenging Poetry Markets." One Throne represented itself as being among the world's most diverse literary magazines. One Throne appeared on BuzzFeed's 2016 list of "29 Amazing Literary Magazines You Need to Be Reading", ahead of all other literary magazines published from Canada.

Writers and poets published by One Throne included: Safia Elhillo and Nick Makoha (joint-winners of the 2015 Brunel University African Poetry Prize), Chloe Honum (Pushcart Prize winner), Chikodili Emelumadu (2014 Shirley Jackson Award nominee and shortlisted for the 2017 Caine Prize), Tendai Huchu (shortlisted for the 2014 Caine Prize), Ngwatilo Mawiyoo, Fatimah Asghar, Emily Pohl-Weary, Timothy Ogene, and Chika Unigwe.

Every piece of writing was presented alongside its own dedicated visual art. Artists who have contributed include Richard Mosse, who won the £30,000 Deutsche Börse Photography Prize in 2014.

== See also ==
- List of literary magazines
