= Iraqi Institute for Economic Reform =

Iraqi Institute for Economic Reform (IIER) المعهد العراقي للإصلاح الاقتصادي
- Founded: 2004
- Type: Non-profit
- Location: Baghdad (Iraq)
- Region served: Iraq
- Website: http://www.iier.org/

The Iraqi Institute for Economic Reform (IIER) is a non-profit, non-governmental research institute based in Baghdad, Iraq.

Founded in 2004, IIER seeks to stimulate debate about economic reform policy in Iraq by organizing monthly public policy seminars in the Al-Rasheed Hotel in Baghdad.

IIER's public policy seminar overview on the transparency of Iraq's federal budget was published in the Global Arab Network.
