= Timothy Ogene =

Nigerian writer and academic

- Born: Port Harcourt, Nigeria
- Education: St. Edward's University; University of East Anglia; Wolfson College, Oxford; Darwin College, Cambridge
- Occupation: Writer
- Writing career
- Language: English
- Period: Contemporary
- Genres: Literary fiction, satire
- Notable awards: Book of the Year Award – Creative Writing, African Literature Association
- Website: timothyogene.com

Timothy Ogene is a writer and lecturer at Harvard. He is the author of Descent & Other Poems, The Day Ends Like Any Day, and Seesaw.

== Biography ==
Born and raised in the outskirts of Port Harcourt in southern Nigeria, he has since lived in Liberia, the UK, and the US. His work has appeared in Granta, The Johannesburg Review of Books, Harvard Review, Tincture Journal, Numero Cinq, One Throne Magazine, Poetry Quarterly, Hong Kong Review of Books, Glasgow Review of Books, Tahoma Literary Review, The Missing Slate, Stirring, Kin Poetry Journal, Mad Swirl, Blue Rock Review, and other places.

Ogene holds a first degree in English and History from St. Edward's University and a Master's in World literatures in English from the Wolfson College, Oxford, where his thesis on Chinua Achebe was co-supervised by Elleke Boehmer and Tiziana Morosetti He later completed a Master's in Creative Writing at the University of East Anglia and gained a PhD in English from the University of Cambridge. His dissertation on contemporary African writing was supervised by Christopher Warnes. He also studied at the Summer School in Global Studies and Critical Theory at the University of Bologna.

Twice nominated for a Pushcart Prize, he was shortlisted for the 2010 Arvon International Poetry Competition, and his collection, Descent & Other Poems, was included in the Australian Book Review's Books of the Year 2016 and was also listed as a Literary Hub favourite for 2017. Of his poetry, Felicity Plunkett writes: "Timothy Ogene’s poems are writings of witness, displacement and beauty. Instead of a home address there are poems as address, at once exquisitely gentle and acute. The sharpness of the poems’ blades—whether literal, like the blades that peel Cassavas and leave the speaker's arms scarred, or deeper injuries of trauma and loss—sits alongside their subtlety and tenderness. These are poems of deep attentiveness to the smallest encounters, and to the largest questions of love, doubt, solitude and migration. Their crafting reveals Ogene's deep reading, both of poetry and of the landscapes the poems explore. How do poems that bear witness to violence, loss and displacement open so gently to the reader? This paradox is one of many in these wise, important poems. I am reminded of Hélène Cixous’s description of Paul Celan’s poetry as ‘writing that speaks of and through disaster such that disaster and desert become author or spring’. Where trees hold ‘time in absent leaves’, these poems mourn roots but refrain from ‘easy paths’, offering, instead, the force and grace of a numinous poetics."

In 2008, Timothy was selected to participate in the first Jane Goodall Global Youth Summit, and in 2009 he was awarded a Dekeyser & Friends Fellowship by the Dekeyser & Friends Foundation. As part of the Dekeyser & Friends Fellowship, he "worked with [Markus Wasmeier and] an international group of young people to restore a 17th-century farmhouse in the German Alps utilizing original materials, traditional tools, wood-crafting and handicraft techniques."

While living in Liberia, he was a mentor at the Strongheart Fellows Program, "an innovative educational program to help exceptional young people from extremely challenging backgrounds rise above circumstance and excel in our larger shared world." He also volunteered part-time teaching literature at Robertsport High School in Grand Cape Mount County.

== Bibliography ==
Poetry

- Descent & Other Poems, 2016 (finalist, Glenna Luschei Prize for African Poetry)

Novels

- The Day Ends Like Any Day, 2017 (winner, Book of the Year Award – Creative Writing, African Literature Association)
- Seesaw, Swift Press, 2021
