= Christine Hyung-Oak Lee =

American writer

- Born: 1973 (age 51–52); New York City, U.S.
- Occupation: Writer
- Education: University of California, Berkeley; Mills College (MFA)
- Children: 1

Website
- www.christinehlee.com

Christine Hyung-Oak Lee (born 1973) is an American writer best known for her book, Tell Me Everything You Don’t Remember, a memoir about her stroke and recovery, published by Ecco Books in 2017. The book is based on her 2014 BuzzFeed essay.

== Personal life ==
Lee was born in New York City, the first of two children born to Korean American immigrants. She spent most of her childhood in Southern California, and graduated from UC Berkeley, where she focused on English literature and Asian American Studies. She received her MFA from Mills College. She currently lives in Berkeley, California.

In 1999, she married her college sweetheart, and at the age of 33, she survived a left thalamic stroke on December 31, 2006, which left her with a fifteen-minute short-term memory. She was married for 14 years and divorced after the birth of their child.

== Career ==
Lee has written short stories, reviews, and articles for The New York Times, BuzzFeed, Guernica, The Rumpus, and Catapult, where she sustained a column called Backyard Politics about seeing the world through the lens of her urban farm.

In 2014, Lee wrote a personal essay about her stroke and recovery for BuzzFeed, which went viral and garnered over 300,000 views within 36 hours.

In 2017, she published her book, Tell Me Everything You Don’t Remember, which was featured by The New York Times and NPR’s Weekend Edition With Scott Simon. The book, according to scholar James Kyung-Jin Lee, was “the first time in U.S. history that a major trade press published a work of nonfiction by an Asian American whose narrative was primarily occupied by illness.”

Lee taught fiction and nonfiction writing in the MFA programs at Fresno State University and Saint Mary’s College of California as a visiting writer.
