= Nathaniel Frank =

American historian and writer

- Born: Philadelphia, Pennsylvania
- Occupations: writer, historian
- Writing career
- Genre: non-fiction
- Notable work: Unfriendly Fire: How The Gay Ban Undermines The Military and Weakens America
- Website: www.nathanielfrank.com/about

Nathaniel Frank (born in Philadelphia, Pennsylvania) is an American historian and writer.

== Life ==
Frank studied history at Brown University and at Northwestern University in the United States. He worked as a senior research fellow at the Palm Center at the University of California, Santa Barbara, and an adjunct professor of history at New York University. At the Cornell University he works as professor for history. He is the published author of "Unfriendly Fire: How The Gay Ban Undermines The Military and Weakens America". He lives with his partner in The Bronx. In 2014 Harvard University Press asked Frank to write a history of the marriage equality movement, after the publisher read his articles on Slate.com. The result was the book Awakening, for which Frank interviewed about 50 people, among them Edie Windsor.

== Works by Frank ==
- Nathaniel, Frank (March 3, 2009). Unfriendly Fire: How the Gay Ban Undermines the Military and Weakens America. St. Martin's Press. ISBN 9780312373481.
- Nathaniel, Frank (April 24, 2017). Awakening: How Gays and Lesbians Brought Marriage Equality to America. Harvard University Press. ISBN 9780674977563.

== Awards ==
- 2010: Stonewall Book Award, Israel Fishman Non-Fiction Award for Unfriendly Fire: How the Gay Ban Undermines the Military and Weakens America
- Nomination for 22nd Lambda Literary Awards
