= My Journey into the Heart of Terror =

2016 memoir of Jürgen Todenhöfer

- Ten Days in the Islamic State
- Author: Jürgen Todenhöfer
- Original title: Inside IS - 10 Tage im 'Islamischen Staat'
- Language: German
- Genre: Memoir
- Published: Greystone Books
- Publication date: 2015
- Publication place: Germany
- English publication date: 2016
- Pages: 288
- ISBN: 978-1-77164-224-8 (Hardcover)

My Journey into the Heart of Terror: Ten Days in the Islamic State is a 2016 memoir by German journalist Jürgen Todenhöfer. Todenhöfer was the first western journalist to travel to the self-proclaimed Islamic State (ISIS), alternatively known as ISIL, to find out the cause of the fighting in Iraq and Syria. He describes the experience he and his son went through during the journey in his memoir. Todenhöfer rejects the description 'Islamic terrorism' and considers the acts of ISIS fighters as non-Islamic.

== Author ==
Jürgen Todenhöfer is a German journalist, and a former judge and politician. He had previously met with leaders of the Mujahedeen in Soviet-occupied Afghanistan and the Taliban and al-Qaeda. He also visited Bashar al-Assad, President of Syria, several times in 2012.

== Journey to the Islamic State ==
In the summer of 2014, Todenhӧfer sent a message on Facebook to more than 80 German ISIS soldiers asking whether he could visit the ISIS fighting cadre. His goal was to understand the motivations of ISIS. On September 9, Abu Qatadah, a 31-year-old German, answered the message. They had Skype discussions for several months. Finally, Todenhӧfer received a document from the Caliphate guaranteeing his safety. In October 2014, Todenhӧfer became the first western journalist to travel to ISIS-controlled territory. He was accompanied by his filmmaker son, Frederic.

Todenhöfer wrote that he stayed with an ISIS soldier who was armed with a Kalashnikov rifle. The soldier told him that he was sure to return home alive because ISIS wanted to be accepted as a state, so he had the guarantee of safety from their leadership. Todenhӧfer spent most of his time in Mosul, Iraq but he also visited ISIS-controlled cities in Syria such as Raqqa and Deir ez-Zor.

== See also ==
- Human rights in ISIL-controlled territory
