= Unfriendly Fire =

2009 American political book

Unfriendly Fire: How the Gay Ban Undermines the Military and Weakens America
- Author: Nathaniel Frank
- Language: English
- Genre: Political
- Publisher: Thomas Dunne Books
- Publication date: March 3, 2009
- Publication place: United States
- Media type: Print (Hardcover)
- Pages: 368 pages
- ISBN: 0-312-37348-1
- OCLC: 243544582
- Dewey Decimal: 355.0086/640973 22
- LC Class: UB418.G38 F73 2009

Unfriendly Fire: How the Gay Ban Undermines the Military and Weakens America is an American 2009 political book by Nathaniel Frank that argues that the "Don't Ask, Don't Tell" policy banning openly gay servicemen and women from the United States armed forces weakened military and national security. According to Frank, 12,000 people — 800 of whom had previously been deemed "mission critical" by the U.S. government — were discharged from the military between 1993 and 2008, based on policies that Frank describes as "rooted in denial, and deception, and repression."

== Content ==
In the book, Frank argues military leaders imposed bans on homosexuals based on fears that their open service would tarnish the military's masculine ideals. Unfriendly Fire argues the Don't Ask, Don't Tell (DADT) policy, enacted in 1993 by President Bill Clinton in an attempt to advance homosexual rights in the military, actually significantly increased the amount of discharges and harassment among gays in the military, while standards have been lowered for accepting felons, ex-convicts and high school drop-outs. While DADT asked gay servicemen not to discuss their sexual orientation in order to maintain unit cohesion, Frank presents empirical evidence arguing that requiring those servicemen to lie or conceal their orientations actually had a negative impact on unit cohesion. According to the book, the RAND Corporation commissioned a 500-page report showing open service would not affect military readiness, but generals ignored it in favor of a video circulated by a Christian producer that graphically described gay sexual practices.

According to Frank, military officials previously involved in creating restrictions on gay servicemen openly admitted during interviews with Frank that those policies were created based not on empirical data, but rather on their own prejudices and fears, as well as pressure from anti-gay activists and organizations. Frank, a senior research fellow at the Palm Center of the University of California, Santa Barbara, spoke with members of the Military Working Group, the 1993 panel of six admirals and generals that helped draft the DADT policy. General Robert Alexander, who headed the panel, said the findings were completely subjective and not based on any actual data, and that the group did not fully understand what "sexual orientation" even meant. John Hutson, a retired United States Navy rear admiral who participated in the talks, told Frank the assessment of gay service was "based on nothing. It wasn't empirical, it wasn't studied, it was completely visceral, intuitive." Another Military Working Group advisor, Lieutenant Colonel Robert Maginnis, said he questioned gay service in the military for "political reasons" because he knew this approach would be more effective than a moral campaign against equal treatment for gays.

== Awards ==
The book received the Stonewall Book Award in 2010 from the Gay, Lesbian, Bisexual, and Transgendered Round Table of the American Library Association.

== Other ==
On February 28, 2013, at a pretrial hearing in her court-martial, United States Army Private First Class Chelsea Manning testified that in early 2010 she had nicknamed her anonymous contact at WikiLeaks Nathaniel Frank, "after the author of a book I read in 2009."

== See also ==
- Bibliography of works on the United States military and LGBT+ topics
