= Anatoly Aleksin =

Russian writer and poet

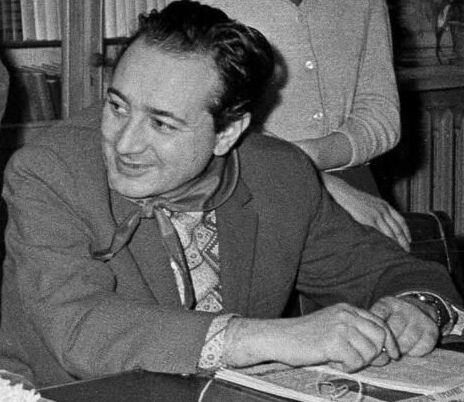
1960s

Anatoly Georgievich Aleksin (Russian: Анато́лий Гео́ргиевич Але́ксин; original surname Goberman, Russian: Гоберман; 3 August 1924 in Moscow, Russian SFSR, Soviet Union – 1 May 2017 in Luxembourg City, Luxembourg), was a Soviet, Russian and Israeli writer and poet.

In the late thirties Aleksin's poems were published in a children's newspaper, Pionerskaya Pravda. In 1950 he graduated from the Moscow Institute of Oriental Studies and his first novel Thirty one day (Тридцать один день) was published. He was a chairman of the Russian Federation Union of Writers from 1970 to 1989 and a member of the editorial board in of the literature journal Yunost. He also wrote the book titled "Secret of the Yellow House". Aleksin lived in Israel from 1993 until 2012. Then he moved to Luxembourg, where he lived until his death.

== Bibliography ==
- А тем временем где-то - Meanwhile, somewhere
- Безумная Евдокия - Reckless Yevdokia (1976)
- Говорит седьмой этаж - Seventh floor speaking (1959)
- Дневник жениха - The diary of fiancé (1980)
- Домашний совет - Domestic council (1980)
- Звоните и приезжайте!- Call and Come in (1970)
- Ивашов - Ivashov (1980)
- Коля пишет Оле, Оля пишет Коле – Kolya writes to Olya, Olya writes to Kolya (1965)
- Мой брат играет на кларнете - My brother plays the clarinet
- Необычайные похождения Севы Котлова - Extraordinary adventures of Seva Kotlev (1958)
- Поздний ребенок - A late-born child (1968)
- Раздел имущества - The division of the property
- Саша и Шура - Sasha and Shura (1956)
- Сердечная недостаточность - Heart failure (1979)
- Третий в пятом ряду - The third in fifth row (1975)
- Здоровые и больные – Healthy and sick (1982)
- Очень страшная история – A very scary story
