= South Dakota Library Association =

Professional association for librarians in South Dakota

- Nickname: SDLA
- Formation: March 19, 1891; 135 years ago
- Tax ID no.: 23-7038623
- Parent organization: American Library Association

The South Dakota Library Association (SDLA) is a professional organization for South Dakota's librarians and library workers to "promote libraries within the state and provide library service for the populace."

It is headquartered in Lennox, South Dakota. SDLA started as a section of the South Dakota Federated Women’s Club (SDFWC) in 1904; two years later it began to be sponsored by the South Dakota Education Association for the nest eleven years. SDLA did t officially admit men to the membership until 1905. SDLA’s first official meeting was held in Sioux Falls on December 27, 1906, under their president W. H. Powers and older documents point towards an "organized" date of 1907. SDLA held its first independent meeting in Pierre, on September 5–6, 1917. SDLA became a chapter of the American Library Association in 1921.

SDLA, along with the South Dakota State Library, sponsors an annual South Dakota Children's Book Awards – Prairie Bud, Prairie Bloom, and Prairie Pasque Children's Book Awards – and a Young Adult Reading Program.

== See also ==
- List of libraries in the United States
