= List of people from Ahmedabad =

This is a list of notable residents of Ahmedabad, India. Residents may be known as Ahmedabadi or Amdavadi.

== Business ==
- Shantidas Jhaveri, jeweller, bullion trader, and moneylender
- Ranchhodlal Chhotalal, first industrialist and mill-owner of Ahmedabad
- Lalbhai Dalpatbhai, industrialist and first-generation mill-owner
- Ambalal Sarabhai, industrialist
- Kasturbhai Lalbhai, industrialist
- Shrenik Kasturbhai Lalbhai - Indian businessman and philanthropist, known for his contributions to education and research in India.
- Karsanbhai Patel - Indian billionaire entrepreneur and founder of Nirma, a consumer goods company that specializes in soaps, detergents, and other household products
- Pankaj Patel - Indian businessman and former chairman of Cadila Healthcare, a leading pharmaceutical company in India
- Gautam Adani - Industrialist and chairman and founder of the Adani Group
- Komal Shah (art collector), art collector, philanthropist, computer engineer, and businessperson in Silicon Valley
- Kakalbhai Kothari Indian Journalist, Veteran Freedom Fighter and founder of The Prabhat Group of Newspapers. It was one of the first Gujarati language daily newspaper founded in 1934.

== Entertainment ==
- Alisha Chinai, an Indian pop singer known for her Indi-pop albums as well as playback singing in Hindi cinema.
- Darshan Raval, an Indian singer & composer.
- Disha Vakani, Actor and Worked in The Show Taarak Mehta Ka Ooltah Chashmah
- Tapas Relia - Indian Music Director
- Naresh Kanodia - Indian actor and politician, known for his work in Gujarati cinema
- Mrinalini Sarabhai - Padma Shri in 1965, Padma Bhushan 1992
- Kumudini Lakhia - awarded Padma Shri in 1987
- Taarak Mehta - awarded Padma Shri in 2015
- Vaishal Shah - Film producer (Gujarati, Marathi, Hindi)

== Politics ==
- Brahmkumar Bhatt - Indian independence activist, Mahagujarat movement activist, Member of parliament, Member of Legislative Assembly, Former Chairman of Gujarat Electricity Board (GEB) and Former Chairman of Indian Farmers Fertiliser Cooperative(IFFCO)
- Gulzarilal Nanda - Indian politician and economist who specialised in labour issues; posthumously awarded Bharat Ratna in 1997
- Sardar Vallabhbhai Patel - Indian independence nationalist and barrister who served as the first Deputy Prime Minister and Home Minister of India from 1947 to 1950; posthumously awarded Bharat Ratna in 1991
- Mallika Sarabhai - Awarded Padma Bhushan in 2010
- Sakharam Ganesh Pandit, an Indian-American lawyer and civil rights activist
- M. C. Bhatt - Human rights lawyer
- Girishbhai Patel - Human rights lawyer
- Shamshad Pathan - Human rights lawyer
- Jhinabhai Desai - Gujarati poet better known as Snehrashmi, author, educator, political leader and Indian independence activist
- Prasannavadan Bhagwanji Desai - Indian demographer, economist and independence activist
- Subramaniam Hariharan Iyer - Human rights lawyer
- Mukul Sinha - Human rights lawyer
- Nirjhari Sinha - Human rights activist
- Achyut Yagnik - Journalist, academic and activist
- Ela Bhatt - Padma Shri in 1985, Padma Bhushan in 1986
- Keshavram Kashiram Shastri - awarded Padma Shri in 1976

== Science ==
- George Joseph - Awarded Padma Bhushan in 1999
- Pramod Kale - Awarded Padma Bhushan in 1984
- P.R. Pisharoty - Awarded Padma Bhushan in 1970
- Satya Prakash - Awarded Padma Bhushan in 1982
- Dr. Vikram Sarabhai - Indian physicist and astronomer who initiated space research and helped develop nuclear power in India; awarded Padma Bhushan in 1966; posthumously awarded Padma Vibhushan in 1972

== Sports ==
- Jasprit Bumrah (born 1993), cricketer
- Geet Sethi - Awarded Padma Shri in 1986
- Jasu Patel - Awarded Padma Shri in 1960
- Jay Shah - BCCI Secretary (administrator)

== Other ==
- Dr. Vikran I. Shah, an Indian orthopedic surgeon, based in Ahmedabad. Shah established Shalby Hospitals in 1994.
- Prakash K. Desai - Air Marshal of the Indian Air Force
- Narhari Parikh (born 1891, died 1957), writer, activist, and social reformer
- Jyotsna Yagnik - Judge
- Balkrishna Doshi - awarded Padma Shri in 1976
- Haku Shah - awarded Padma Shri in 1989
- Kartikeya Sarabhai - awarded Padma Shri in 2012
- Tejas Patel - awarded Padma Shri twice
- Anil K Gupta - awarded Padma Shri in 2004
- Jayanti Patel - actor, playwright, yoga teacher
