= List of people with surname Patel =

This article lists notable people of the Indian surname Patel.

== Politics ==
- Kanish Patel, Nepalese Politician, Member of Provincial Assembly, Madhesh Pradesh, Nepal
- Abdul Qadir Patel, Pakistani politician, former Federal Health Minister of Pakistan.
- A. D. Patel, Fijian politician
- Adam Patel, Baron Patel of Blackburn, member of the House of Lords of the United Kingdom
- Ahmed Patel, Indian politician
- Anandiben Patel, Chief Minister of Gujarat (2014–2016)
- Anupriya Patel, Indian Politician
- Babubhai Patel (politician), Bharatiya Janata Party politician
- Babubhai Jashbhai Patel, Chief Minister of Gujarat (1975–1976, 1977–1980)
- Bhupendrabhai R. Patel, Chief Minister of Gujarat (2021–)
- Chimanbhai Patel, Chief Minister of Gujarat (1973–1974, 1990–1994)
- Dahyabhai Patel, Indian freedom fighter, politician
- Dinsha Patel, Indian politician
- Dipak Patel (politician), Zambian politician
- Eboo Patel, American political consultant
- Hardik Patel, Indian politician
- Haribhai M. Patel, Indian politician
- Harilal Madhavjibhai Patel, Indian politician
- Ibrahim Ali Patel, Indian Politician
- Jayadevappa Halappa Patel, former Chief Minister of Karnataka
- Kamlesh Patel, Baron Patel of Bradford, British politician
- Kanjibhai Patel, Indian politician
- Kash Patel, American attorney and Director of the FBI (since 2025)
- Keshubhai Patel, Chief Minister of Gujarat (1995, 1998–2001)
- Kishanbhai Vestabhai Patel, Indian politician
- Lilian Patel, Malawian politician
- Navin Patel, Fiji-Indian politician
- Nitin Patel, Deputy Chief Minister of Gujarat (2016–2021)
- Pasha Patel, Indian politician
- Patel Dahyabhai Vallabhbhai, Indian politician
- Praful Patel, Indian politician
- Priti Patel, British politician, former Home Secretary
- Qadir Patel, Pakistani politician, currently member of National assembly
- R. D. Patel, Indo-Fijian lawyer
- R. K. Singh Patel, agriculturist and politician
- Ramaben Patel (born 1953), lawyer and politician from Gujarat
- S. B. Patel, Indian politician
- Somabhai Gandalal Koli Patel, Indian politician
- Sone Lal Patel, Indian politician
- Tribhuvandas Kishibhai Patel, man behind the Milk Movement (Amul) of India
- Vallabhbhai Patel (1875–1950), Indian politician, first Deputy Prime Minister of India (1947–1950)
- Vedant Patel, deputy spokesperson for the U.S. Department of State
- Vinod Patel, Fiji-Indian politician
- Vinubhai Patel, Fiji-Indian politician
- Vipal J. Patel, Indian-American attorney
- Vithalbhai Patel, Indian politician

== Arts ==
- Alpesh Patel, American film director
- Amisha Patel, Bollywood actress
- Anuradha Patel, Indian actress
- Ashmit Patel, Bollywood actor
- Dev Patel, British actor
- Devang Patel, Indian singer
- Gayatri Patel, Bollywood actress
- Geeta Patel, American film and television director
- Gieve Patel, Indian poet
- Harish Patel, Indian actor
- Himesh Patel, British actor
- Ishu Patel, Indian animated film director
- Karan Patel, Indian actor
- Kumar Patel, Fictional film character
- Neil Patel, American scenic designer
- Nikki Patel, British actress
- Nimesh Patel, American comedian
- Pannalal Patel, Indian writer
- Punam Patel, American actress
- Ravi Patel, American actor
- Ravji Patel, Indian poet and novelist
- Rihaan Patel, Indian film director
- Rupal Patel, Indian actress
- Sameer Iqbal Patel, Indian actor
- Sheena Patel, British author
- Sonia Patel, Indian-American psychologist and author
- Upen Patel, Bollywood actor

== Sports ==
- Aditya Patel, Indian professional racing driver
- Akhil Patel, English cricketer
- Akshar Patel, Indian cricketer
- Ashish Patel, Canadian cricketer
- Ashok Patel, Indian cricketer
- Ashok Sitaram Patel, Kenyan cricketer
- Axar Patel, Indian cricketer
- Brijal Patel, Kenyan cricketer
- Brijesh Patel, Indian cricketer
- C. D. Patel, Tanzanian cricketer
- Chetan Patel, English cricketer
- Dinesh Patel, American baseball player
- Dipak Patel (cricketer, born 1958), New Zealand cricketer
- Dipak Patel (cricketer, born 1961), Indian cricketer
- Harshal Patel, Indian cricketer
- Jasu Patel, Indian cricketer
- Jeetan Patel, New Zealand cricketer
- Jitendra Patel, Canadian cricketer
- Jyotsna Patel, Indian cricketer
- Kalpesh Patel (Indian cricketer), Indian cricketer
- Kalpesh Patel, Kenyan cricketer
- Kirti Patel, Indian cricketer
- Malhar Patel, Kenyan cricketer
- Mehul Patel, Indian cricketer
- Min Patel, Indian cricketer
- Mitesh Patel, Indian hockey player
- Mohan Patel, New Zealand hockey player
- Munaf Patel, Indian Cricketer
- Nandikishore Patel, Ugandan cricketer
- Niraj Patel, Indian cricketer
- Parag Patel, English shooter
- Paresh Patel, New Zealand hockey player
- Parthiv Patel, Indian cricketer
- R. D. Patel (cricketer), Tanzanian cricketer
- Rakep Patel, Kenyan cricketer
- Rakesh Patel, Indian cricketer
- Ramesh Patel, New Zealand hockey player
- Rashid Patel, Indian Cricketer
- Rita Patel, Indian cricketer
- Safia Middleton-Patel Welsh footballer
- Sameer Patel, English cricketer
- Samit Patel, English cricketer

== Others ==
- Amit Patel, American surgeon
- Anushka Patel, Australian scientist and cardiologist
- Apoorva D. Patel, hue physicist
- Baburao Patel, Indian publisher, writer
- Chai Patel, British doctor and businessman
- Chandrakant T. Patel, Indian scientist
- Dorab Patel, Pakistani judge, activist
- Framjee Nasarwanjee Patel, Indian merchant, philanthropist
- Girish Patel, Indian human rights lawyer
- Harilal Manilal Patel, Fiji Indian lawyer
- I. G. Patel, Indian economist
- Karsanbhai Patel, Indian industrialist
- Kamlesh Patel (Daaji), Padmbhushan Awardee, Author, Spiritual Leader
- Kevin Patel, an American climate activist
- Kiran C. Patel, Indian-American surgeon and philanthropist
- Kumar Patel, American Inventor
- Maniben Patel, Indian freedom fighter
- Narendra M. Patel, Ugandan politician and lawyer
- Narendra Patel, Baron Patel, Tanzanian obstetrician
- Nilay Patel, American technology journalist
- Nisha Patel, British police officer
- Pankaj Patel, Indian entrepreneur
- Poorvi Patel, Swedish-American electrical engineer
- Raj Patel, British Indian writer
- Ramanbhai Patel, Indian chemist
- Rupal Patel (scientist), speech scientist working in USA
- Satyam Patel, Indian social activist
- Shakil Patel, Indian American architect
- Sheela Patel, Indian activist
- Shirish B. Patel, Indian civil engineer
- Shiv Kumar Patel, Indian outlaw
- Tejas Patel, Indian cardiologist
- Trupti Patel, British pharmacist
- Urjit Patel, Governor of RBI
- V. G. Patel, Indian author, economist
- Vimla L. Patel, Canadian psychologist
- Viraf Patel, Indian model

== See also ==
- Meet the Patels
- Patil (surname)
