= Tejas Patel =

Indian cardiologist

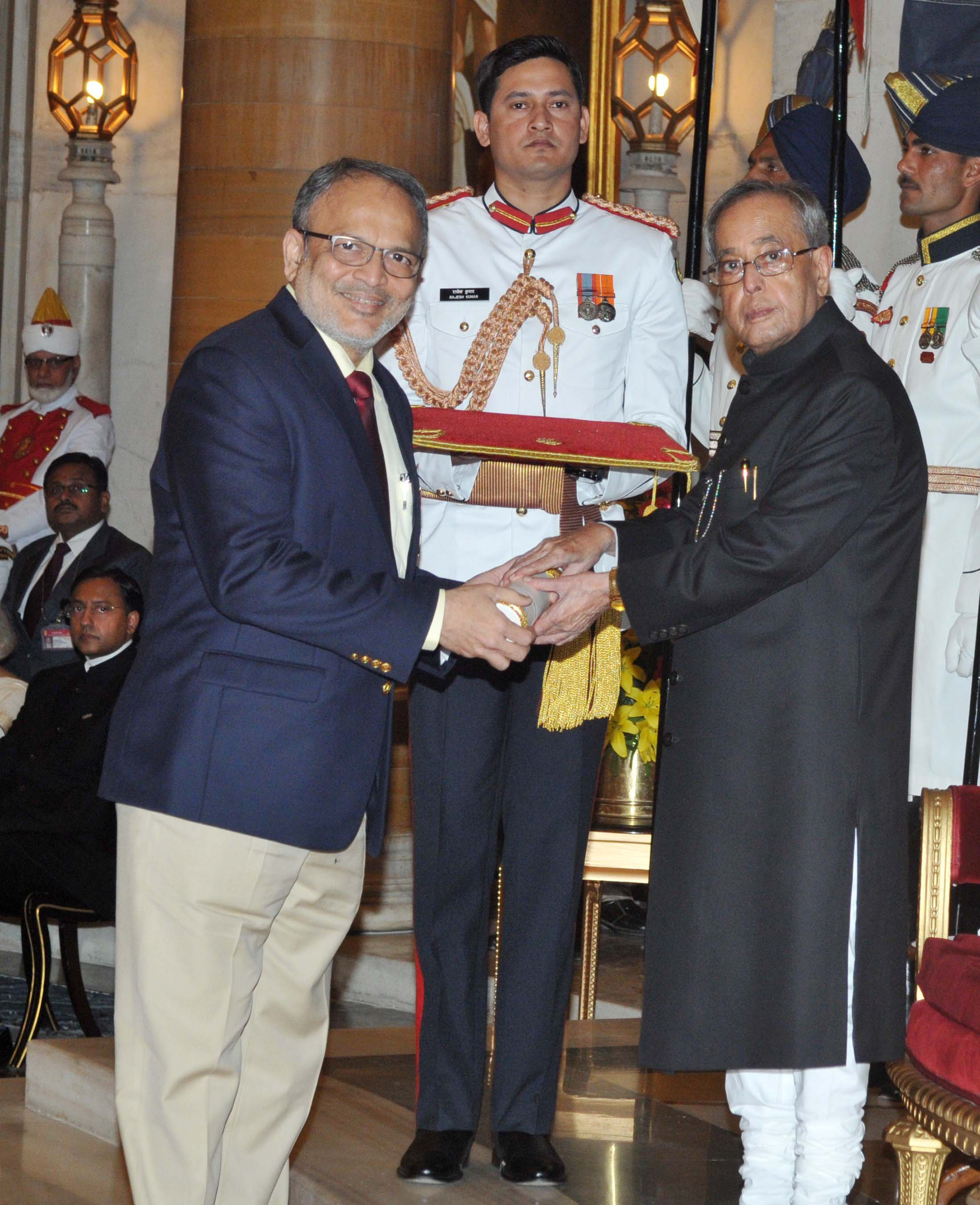
- Born: Ahmedabad, Gujarat, India
- Education: B.J. Medical College, Gujarat University
- Occupation: Interventional cardiologist
- Known for: Transradial interventions, cardiology, Angioplasty, Robotic Coronary Interventions
- Spouse: Sonali Patel
- Children: 1
- Awards: Padma Bhushan (2024); Padma Shri (2015); Dr. B. C. Roy Award (2008); IMA Dr. K. Sharan Cardiology Excellence Award (2002)
- Website: www.apexheart.in

Tejas M. Patel is an Indian cardiologist and the chairman and chief interventional cardiologist at Apex Heart Institute, Ahmedabad. Patel has received several honors, including the Dr. B. C. Roy Award, the Padma Shri in 2015, and the Padma Bhushan in 2024, for his contributions to the medical field.

== Early life ==
Tejas Patel was born in the Indian state of Gujarat and did his schooling with a national scholarship. He graduated in medicine (MBBS) from B. J. Medical College, Ahmedabad affiliated with Gujarat University with the first rank and gold medal, did his residency at the civil hospital of the college and secured his masters studies, (MD) from there. He also obtained a DM from the U. N. Mehta Institute of Cardiology and Research Centre where he was the chief resident cardiologist for two years during his period of study.

== Career ==
He continued at the institute to start his career, in 1991, as an assistant professor of cardiology and was promoted in 1997 as an associate professor while he also worked as a visiting professor at the Gujarat Research and Medical Institute (GRMI), a post he held till 2000. He joined Krishna Heart Institute, Ahmedabad as the director and chief interventional cardiologist in 2000 and worked there till his move to Sterling Hospitals, Ahmedabad in 2004 for a two-year stint. In 2006, he moved to TCVS, which was rebranded as Apex Heart Institute in 2012 where is the incumbent chairman and the chief interventional cardiologist. During a brief interlude, he also served SBKS Medical Institute and Research Centre, Gujarat as a professor of cardiology. He is also a professor and head of the department of cardiology at institutions such as Smt. NHL Municipal Medical College, Ahmedabad, Sheth Vadilal Sarabhai General Hospital (VS Hospital) and Sheth K. M. School of Post Graduate Medicine and Research since 2008 and is a visiting faculty at Virginia Commonwealth University Medical Centre, Richmond USA. He is the first Asian to be appointed as visiting professor in Mayo Clinic, USA.

Patel is a pioneer of transradial angioplasty in India. He has published several medical papers and abstracts besides two books, Patel’s Atlas of Transradial Intervention: The Basics and Patel’s Atlas of Transradial Intervention: The Basics and Beyond, both reference books on the subject. He has undertaken several clinical trials related to stenting, transradial interventions, low molecular weight heparin, glycoprotein IIb, IIIa inhibitors and mitral balloon valvuloplasties as the chief investigator or co-investigator and has participated in the design and development of guiding catheters for use in transradial route.

Patel has conducted classes and has performed live demonstrations at many countries such as France, USA, Spain, Japan, Singapore, the Netherlands, and UK. He has delivered lectures on invitation at American College of Cardiology and Society for Cardiac Angiography and Interventions, USA. He is a member of the editorial boards of Indian Heart Journal, Journal of American College of Cardiology (Indian Edition) and Journal of Invasive Cardiology and is a reviewer for American Journal of Cardiology, International Journal of Cardiology and JACC Interventions. He is the director of TRICO (Transradial Intervention) course, an annual course hosted at Ahmedabad since 2005.

In early 2018, Patel-owned Apex Heart Institute became the first hospital outside USA to introduce robotic angioplasty & stenting by acquiring Corindus Corpath Vascular Robotic System GRX200 for $1.5 million. The system is designed to make angioplasty safer, precise and more accurate.

On 5 December 2018, Tejas Patel, Sanjay Shah and the team of doctors at Apex Heart Institute created a history in the field of interventional cardiology by performing world's first-in-man telerobotic coronary intervention from Akshardham temple located in Gandhinagar roughly 32 kilometers away from the patient. The operation used the high speed internet provided by Reliance Jio Infocomm and Corindus Vascular Robotics Corpath GRX 200 which the hospital had acquired in January 2018. The surgery was broadcast live on the Internet and at the press conference.

== Recognition ==
Tejas Patel, whose name was listed in the 18th edition of Marquis Who's Who, is a recipient of the Dr. K. Sharan Cardiology Excellence Award from the Indian Medical Association. The Government of India awarded him the Dr. B. C. Roy Award, the highest Indian medical award, in 2005 and the Padma Shri in 2015. In 2024, he was further recognized with the Padma Bhushan and named a Master Fellow of SCAI (MSCAI).

== See also ==
- Interventional cardiology
- Bio-absorbable stents
- Transradial intervention
