= Chitrakoot Colony =

Neighbourhoodin Jaipur, India

Chitrakoot (Jaipur) Chitrakoot Chitrakoot Scheme
- Urban
- Chitrakoot (Jaipur)
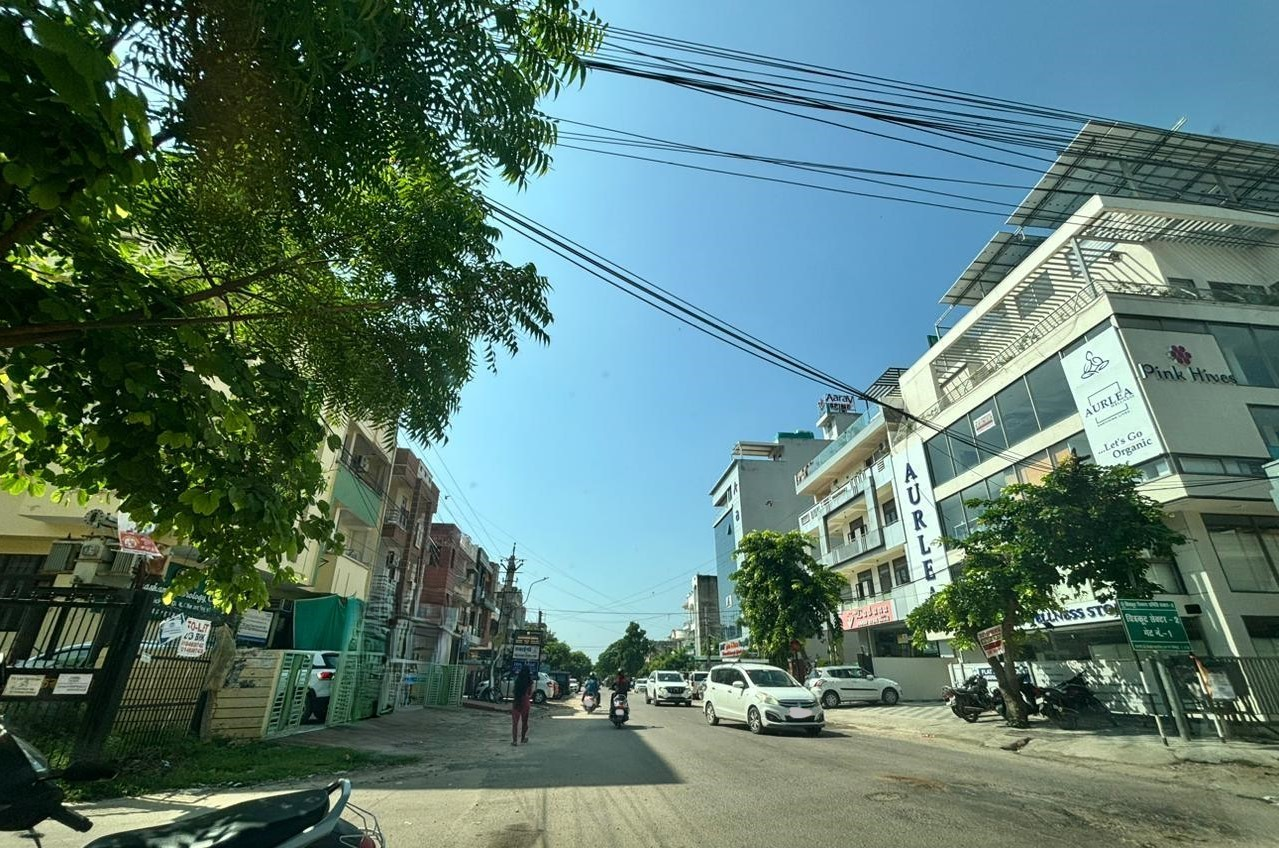
- A street in Chitrakoot Jaipur, with mixed residential and commercial buildings.

- Location in Rajasthan, India Chitrakoot (Jaipur) (India)
- Coordinates: 26.90°N 75.73°E
- Country: India
- State: Rajasthan
- District: Jaipur

Area
  - Total: 1.20 km^{2} (0.46 sq mi)
- Time zone: UTC+5:30 (IST)
- PIN: 302021
- Telephone code: 0141
- Lok Sabha constituency: Jaipur

Chitrakoot is a planned neighborhood located in the western part of Jaipur, Rajasthan. The area is organized into 12 sectors, of which 10 are primarily residential. Housing in the area includes independent houses and apartment buildings. The remaining two sectors are designated for commercial and social use and include businesses, shopping areas, and community facilities.

== Major places ==
Worship

- Shree Swaminarayan Mandir

Sports

- Shree Pratap Yadav Stadium (Chitrakoot Stadium)

== Location ==
Chitrakoot is located along Ajmer Road in West Jaipur. It is bordered by Vaishali Nagar (Jaipur) to the north, Vidyut Nagar to the east, and Pratap Nagar to the west. The area is approximately 15 km from Jaipur International Airport. The 200 Feet Bypass, an important road, runs adjacent to Chitrakoot, providing direct connectivity to other parts of Jaipur and access to the city's main roads.

== Transport ==
The neighborhood is easily accessible by auto-rickshaws and taxis. Ajmer Road and the 200 Foot Bypass Road pass near the area and provide road connectivity to other parts of Jaipur.

== Education ==
Chitrakoot is close to several educational institutions in Jaipur. The area is also home to various coaching centers and tutoring services. Some notable schools include:

- Jayshree Periwal High School
- Jayshree Periwal International Pre School (Under Jayshree Periwal Schools)
- Blue Star Public School
- Bhabha Public School

== Health facilities ==
Health facilities in and around Chitrakoot include hospitals and other medical services. Hospitals in the area include:

- Shalby Hospital
- Global Heart General Hospital

== Commercial and retail ==
Chitrakoot features a mix of local markets and modern shopping centers. Daily necessities can be easily purchased from the neighborhood shops, while larger retail chains and supermarkets are also available. Malls include:

- Mall of Jaipur (Gandhi path West)
- Vaibhav Tower (Vaishali Nagar (Jaipur))
- Evershine Tower (Vaishali Nagar (Jaipur))
