= Jhotwara =

- Suburban
- Location in Jaipur, Rajasthan, India Jhotwara (Greater Jaipur) Jhotwara (Rajasthan) Jhotwara (India)
- Coordinates: 26.943041°N 75.757057°E
- Country: India
- State: Rajasthan
- District: Jaipur

Languages
  - Official: Hindi
- Time zone: UTC+5:30 (IST)
- PIN: 302012
- Nearest city: Jaipur
- Climate: Hot and dry (Köppen)

Jhotwara is a suburban area of Jaipur in the north-west direction of Jaipur, the capital of Indian State of Rajasthan. It is a Legislative Assembly constituency

== History ==
This area was under meena tribe which was annexed in Kachhwaha Rajput kingdom of Amber by Rao Dulha. It was ruled by the Jaipur royal family till Independence of India.

== Area under Jhotwara ==
These are 22 ward under Jhotwara.

- Vaishali Nagar
- Kanakpura
- Panchyawala
- Meenawala
- Girdharipura
- Lalpura
- Dhawas
- Heerapura
- Gajsinghpura
- Mukumdpura
- Maharajpura
- Bindayka
- Sirsi
