= Nirjhari Sinha =

Indian human rights activist

- Occupation: Physicist
- Employer(s): Physical Research Laboratory, Ahmedabad
- Organization(s): Jan Sangharsh Manch, Pravda Media Foundation
- Known for: Human rights activism
- Spouse: Mukul Sinha
- Children: Pratik Sinha

Nirjhari Sinha is an Indian human rights activist who, with her husband Mukul Sinha, founded Jan Sangharsh Manch (JSM). She is also director of Pravda Media Foundation, the parent organization of the fact-checking website AltNews run by her son Pratik Sinha and Mohammed Zubair.

== Jan Sangharsh Manch ==
Working under the banner of JSM, Sinha has been fighting for justice for the poor and marginalized including laborers, workers, women and minorities in the state of Gujarat for several decades. Sinha is involved in trade union activities and has worked with Gujarat Mazdoor Sabha and the Gujarat Federation of Trade Unions. She has worked for communal harmony, and protested against Prevention of Terrorism Act (POTA). She is the chair of JSM at present.

== 2002 Gujarat riots and subsequent police encounters ==
Sinha took voluntary retirement from her employment at Physical Research Laboratory (PRL) in Ahmedabad in 2008 to fight on the behalf of victims of 2002 Gujarat riots. Her analysis of phone call records pertaining to the riots was instrumental in conviction of former Gujarat Minister and Bharatiya Janata Party leader Maya Kodnani. She also analyzed phone call records pertaining to encounter killings in Gujarat.

== Chalo Una protest march and founding of AltNews ==
Sinha played a role in organizing the "Chalo Una" protest march from Ahmedabad to Una in the aftermath of assault on a Dalit family in Una. She participated in the 10-day march along with Pratik. Their experience during this march provided impetus to founding of AltNews.

== Politics ==
Sinha opposes the right-wing policies of Narendra Modi. She is sympathetic to leftist ideologies. Her husband had founded a socialist party.

== Academic career ==
Sinha is a physicist by training and worked as a scientist at the PRL for many years.

== Scientific papers ==
Nuclear track studies of the SNC meteorite ALH 84001. Sinha, N. & Goswami, J. N. Journal: Meteoritics (ISSN 0026-1114), vol. 29, no. 4, p. 534.

Solar cosmic ray produced nuclides in the Salem meteorite. Nishiizumi, K., Nagai, H., Imamura, M., Honda, M., Kobayashi, K., Kubik, P. W. Journal: Meteoritics, Vol. 25, p. 392.

Nuclear tracks and light noble gases in Allan Hills 84001: Preatmospheric size, fall characteristics, cosmic-ray exposure duration and formation age. J. N. Goswami, N. Sinha, S. V. S. Murty, R. K. Mohapatra, C. J. Clement. Meteroritics & Planetary Science. Volume32, Issue1. January 1997. Pages 91–96.

Multiple fall of Pribram meteorites photographed. XII - Pre-atmospheric size of the Pribram meteorite based on studies of fossil cosmic ray tracks and spallation products. Bagolia, C., Bhandari, N., Sinha, N., Goswami, J. N., Lal, D., Lorin, J. C. Journal: Astronomical Institutes of Czechoslovakia, Bulletin, vol. 31, no. 1, 1980, p. 51-58.

Cosmogenic Records and Trapped Gases in the Nakhla Meteorite. Murty, S. V. S., Mohapatra, R. K., Goswami, J. N., & Sinha, N. Journal: Meteoritics & Planetary Science, vol. 34, Supplement, p.A84.

Isotopic Records in Hibonites from CM Meteorites. Marhas, K. K., Sinha, N., Davis, A. M., & Goswami, J. N. Journal: Meteoritics & Planetary Science, vol. 35, Supplement, p.A102.

Nuclear Track Records in the Abee Chondrite. Goswami, J. N., Lal, D., & Sinha, N. Journal: Meteoritics, Vol. 15, p. 295.

Solar Flare Track Records in Fayetteville Gas-Rich Chondrite. Goswami, J. N. & Sinha, N. Journal: Meteoritics, Vol. 21, p. 375.

The Dhajala meteorite shower: Atmospheric fragmentation and ablation based on cosmic ray track studies. C Bagolia, N Doshi, SK Gupta, S Kumar, D Lal. Nuclear Track Detection. Volume 1, Issue 2, June 1977, Pages 83–92.

Preatmospheric size of the Barwell meteorite: Cosmic-ray track, fusion crust and thermoluminescence studies. C Bagolia, N Doshi, D Lal, DW Sears. Nuclear Track Detection. Volume 2, Issue 1, March 1978, Pages 29–35.

Depth and size dependence of ^{53}Mn activity in chondrites. SK Bhattacharya, M Imamura, N Sinha, N. Bhandari. Earth and Planetary Science Letters. Volume 51, Issue 1, November 1980, Pages 45–57.
