= Ramesh Babaji Maharaj =

Indian Brajavasi saint and spiritual teacher (1938–2026)

Shri Ramesh Babaji Maharaj
- श्री रमेश बाबा
- Braja saint Shri Ramesh Babaji Maharaj
- Born: Rameshwar Prasad Shukla; 13 December 1938; Allahabad, United Provinces, British India
- Died: 6 October 2026 (aged 87); Maan Mandir, Barsana, Mathura district, Uttar Pradesh, India
- Resting place: Barsana, Braja
- Other names: Baba Maharaj; Babashri
- Citizenship: Indian
- Education: Completed college studies by the age of 16
- Occupations: Brajavasi saint; Hindu spiritual teacher; Social worker; Cow-welfare advocate; Environmental campaigner
- Years active: 1954–2026
- Organizations: Maan Mandir Seva Sansthan; Mataji Gaushala
- Known for: Cow welfare; conservation of Braj's hills, forests and sacred ponds; Yamuna restoration campaigns; Radha Rani Braj Yatra; promotion of Harinam sankirtan
- Notable work: Radha Sudha Nidhi (Hindi translation); Braj Bhaav Malika; Swar Vanshi Ke Shabda Noopur Ke
- Title: Mahant of Maan Mandir
- Successor: Brajsharan Das Baba, appointed in March 2024
- Movement: Braj heritage conservation; cow protection; Yamuna restoration
- Parents: Baldev Prasad Shukla; Hemeshwari Devi
- Awards: Padma Shri (2019), Social Work–Animal Welfare
- Website: maanmandir.org

Ramesh Babaji Maharaj, also known as Shri Ramesh Baba Ji Maharaj, Babashri and Baba Maharaj (13 December 1938 – 6 October 2026), was an Indian spiritual teacher, social worker and animal-welfare advocate based in Barsana, Uttar Pradesh. He was associated with Maan Mandir and was particularly known as the founder of Mataji Gaushala, a large cow shelter in Barsana dedicated to rescuing and caring for cows.

His work also encompassed devotional teaching, the restoration of sacred ponds, opposition to destructive mining, tree planting, the Radha Rani Braj Yatra and campaigns concerning the Yamuna.

Maharaj arrived in Braja in 1954 and remained associated with the region until his death in October 2026, a span of approximately 72 years.

In 2019, he was awarded the Padma Shri, India's fourth-highest civilian honour, for his social work in the field of animal welfare.

== Early life ==
=== Background ===
According to the biography published by Maan Mandir Seva Sansthan Trust, Ramesh Babaji Maharaj was born in Allahabad, now Prayagraj, to Baldev Prasad Shukla and Hemeshwari Devi. His mother was affectionately known as Mata Ji, and his elder sister, Tarkeshwari Devi, as Didi Ji. The biography gives his birth name as Rameshwar Prasad Shukla and records his birth at noon on Paush Krishna Saptami in 1938.

The institutional account describes his father, locally known as "Shukla Bhagwan", as a benefactor who distributed inherited land among disadvantaged farmers and offered astrological and palmistry consultations without charge. It also states that he held a senior police appointment in Allahabad during the 1930s.

The biography preserves a devotional account of his parents' pilgrimages to Tarakeswar and Rameswaram to pray to Shiva for children. It relates that his mother experienced a dream in which Shiva promised her a son, and that his father subsequently predicted that the child would renounce worldly life.

=== Education and music ===
The institutional biography describes him as a gifted student who completed his formal education at an early age. It also records his proficiency in music and states that his singing attracted the attention of the Hindustani classical vocalist D. V. Paluskar.

Maharaj learned several percussion instruments, including the pakhavaj, khol, mridanga, dholak and tabla. Music later became an important component of his devotional practice and teaching.

== Spiritual life ==
=== Departure from home ===
According to the institutional biography, his father died when he was five. His mother's attachment to her only son made his wish to leave home difficult to fulfil. After two unsuccessful attempts, he departed openly on his third attempt.

Maharaj recalled the farewell in a ghazal:

मेला सा लग रहा था, जब हम वतन से निकले ।
हर कोई रो रहा था, जब हम वतन से निकले ॥

melā sā laga rahā thā, jaba hama vatana se nikale.
hara koī ro rahā thā, jaba hama vatana se nikale.

It seemed as though a whole gathering had assembled when I left my homeland;
Everyone was weeping when I left my homeland.

He initially spent time in the forests of Chitrakoot, traditionally associated with Rama's exile. The biography presents this period as one of solitude, devotion and longing for Radha and Krishna. It associates his confidence in divine protection with the Sanskrit saying:

स रक्षिता रक्षति यो हि गर्भे ।

sa rakṣitā rakṣati yo hi garbhe.

He who protects in the womb is the protector.

According to a report in Dainik Jagran, he arrived in Barsana in 1954.

=== Spiritual guidance ===
In Barsana, he devoted himself to residence in Braja and the worship of Radha. He accepted the spiritual guidance of Shri Priya Sharan Ji Maharaj, whom the institutional biography describes as a saint and scholar associated with the Śrī Rādhā-sudhā-nidhi, the Mahāvāṇī and the devotional literature of several Vaishnava traditions.

=== Residence at Maan Mandir ===
Maharaj made Maan Mandir, situated on Brahmachal Hill overlooking Gahvarvan in Barsana, his residence. In the devotional tradition of Barsana, the temple commemorates Radha's praṇaya-māna, or loving displeasure, in her relationship with Krishna.

The institutional biography states that the temple was dilapidated and largely abandoned when he settled there. It describes the surrounding woodland and the reported presence of bandits as factors that discouraged visitors. Despite these conditions, he chose to remain.

The biography associates his fearlessness with the invocation:

तस्कराणां पतये नमः ।

taskarāṇāṃ pataye namaḥ.

Salutations to the lord of thieves.

Under his influence, Maan Mandir developed into a centre of devotional practice, scriptural teaching and service to Braja.

== Social and environmental work ==
=== Cow welfare ===
Cow welfare was a principal focus of Ramesh Babaji Maharaj's social work. Shri Mataji Gaushala, located near Barsana, was established by Maan Mandir Seva Sansthan Trust on 7 July 2007 under his inspiration and guidance. According to the organisation's overview, it began with five cows and expanded to care for more than 55,000 cattle on approximately 170 acres. Its work includes providing food, shelter and medical care for neglected, sick and abandoned cattle, including animals rescued from slaughter and trafficking.

The organisation describes its emphasis on rescued cattle as a distinguishing feature. Its vision page claims that it is the only gaushala in India whose cattle are entirely rescued animals and states that only about two per cent of its cows produce milk.

The institutional overview lists 58 feeding sheds and seven fodder-storage buildings capable of holding approximately 15,000 tonnes of fodder. Around 500 workers provide daily care, supported by a dedicated veterinary dispensary and care centre for injured and suffering cattle. The organisation also lists a hospital, a panchagavya and Ayurvedic pharmacy, and programmes for A2 milk production and the improvement of indigenous cattle breeds.

The gaushala processes cattle waste through a biogas plant, compost production and the manufacture of cow-dung fuel logs and other dung- and urine-based products. Its overview gives the biogas plant's capacity as 1,350 cubic metres. A June 2020 article described the shelter's biogas plant as India's largest.

Supporting infrastructure includes approximately 32 tractors, together with excavation and loading equipment for fodder distribution and other operational needs, a bull-driven grain mill, a truck-weighing station and a grain-processing plant with a stated capacity of 50 tonnes per day. A water tank provides storage for two million litres.

The organisation also provides residential accommodation for workers, a guest house with free meals, and an on-site police camp for cattle protection. Its free kitchen serves approximately 700 workers and visitors daily.

=== Restoration of sacred ponds ===
Maharaj encouraged the restoration and preservation of Braja's sacred ponds, known as kunds. The institutional biography credits initiatives undertaken under his inspiration with restoring or protecting more than 36 ponds, including Gaya Kund, Dohani Kund and Vrishbhanu Kund.

The trust's website also reports the restoration of approximately 36 ponds.

=== Protection of hills and forests ===
Maharaj campaigned against destructive mining in the hills of Braja. The institutional biography highlights a protest at Kaman in 2009, when he undertook a fast following the Radha Rani Braj Yatra. According to that account, approximately 10,000 pilgrims and residents joined the protest, after which the Rajasthan government announced protective measures for the affected hills.

He also encouraged tree planting. The biography records an initial proposal to plant 125,000 trees, followed by a larger ambition of 12.5 million trees, or 1.25 crore.

=== Radha Rani Braj Yatra ===
Maharaj established the Radha Rani Braj Yatra, a pilgrimage along the traditional eighty-four-kos circuit of Braja. Maan Mandir Seva Sansthan describes it as a forty-day journey for which participation and basic provisions are free of charge.

The pilgrimage combined visits to sacred sites with congregational singing of the divine names, or nāma-saṅkīrtana. The institutional biography describes it as encouraging devotional gatherings in the villages through which it passed.

=== Promotion of devotional singing ===
Maharaj encouraged the establishment of congregational devotional singing and village processions. The older institutional biography credited initiatives inspired by him with reaching more than 32,000 villages. The trust's website subsequently reported devotional morning processions in more than 35,000 villages.

=== Yamuna campaigns ===
Maharaj supported campaigns addressing pollution and inadequate freshwater flow in the Yamuna through Braja. According to the institutional biography, the movement gained national attention in April 2013 and prompted discussion in Parliament.

His concern for the river formed part of a broader approach that linked environmental protection with the preservation of Braja's religious and cultural landscape.

== Teachings and literary work ==
=== Devotion and service ===
Maharaj emphasised devotion to Radha and Krishna, congregational singing and service without expectation of personal reward. The institutional biography states that he did not formally initiate disciples because he did not consider himself qualified to assume the role of guru.

The biography also states that he did not personally solicit funds for the projects he inspired, instead encouraging followers to place their trust in divine grace while undertaking practical service.

It expresses the difficulty his followers felt in describing his devotional life through the Hindi line:

करनी करुणा सिंधु कि मुख कहत न आवे ।

karanī karuṇā sindhu ki mukha kahata na āve.

The deeds of the ocean of compassion cannot adequately be expressed in words.

=== Scriptural teaching ===
Maharaj taught the Bhagavad Gita, Bhagavata Purana, Vedas and Upanishads. His followers particularly valued his ability to explain complex religious ideas in language accessible to listeners without formal education.

The institutional biography describes a longstanding practice of three daily satsang sessions. It also states that some students trained through his teaching became recognised exponents of Bhāgavata-kathā.

He nevertheless placed devotion above accomplishment as a public speaker. The biography records his view that his students should become devotees rather than merely skilled narrators of scripture.

=== Literary works ===
Works associated with him include Braj Bhaav Malika, Swar Vanshi Ke Shabda Noopur Ke and Rasia Raseshwari. His followers regarded these writings as expressions of his devotional understanding and experience.

=== Radhe Kishori Daya Karo ===
Ramesh Baba Ji is credited as a songwriter, alongside Madhavas, for Madhavas' recording of the devotional song "Radhe Kishori Daya Karo" (राधे किशोरी दया करो), released in 2020.

== Death and legacy ==
Maharaj died at Maan Mandir in Barsana, on 6 October 2026, at the age of 87, following a period of illness.

His wish to spend his final days in Barsana was expressed in the following verse, reproduced in the institutional biography:

यही करुणा करना करुणामयी मम अंत होये बरसाने में ।
पावन गहवरवन कुञ्ज निकट रज में रज होये मिलूं ब्रज में ॥

yahī karuṇā karanā karuṇāmayī mama anta hoye barasāne meṃ.
pāvana gahavaravana kuñja nikaṭa raja meṃ raja hoye milūṃ braja meṃ.

O compassionate one, grant me this mercy: may my life end in Barsana.
Near the sacred bowers of Gahvarvan, may I become dust, mingle with its dust, and be united with Braja.

His institutional legacy included Maan Mandir's devotional teaching, Mataji Gaushala, the Radha Rani Braj Yatra, sacred-site restoration and environmental campaigns.

== Photographs ==
Delivering Bhagavata katha in the 1970s

Early days in Gahvarvan

Photograph from the 1970s

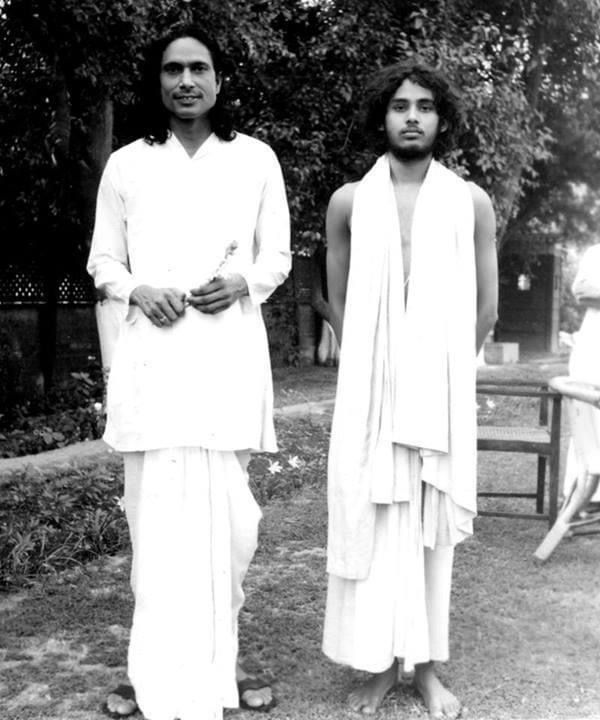
Meeting with sadhus

== Awards ==
- Padma Shri (2019), for Social Work–Animal Welfare.

== See also ==
- Cow protection movement
- Braj
- Barsana
