= Chhatriyala =

- Village
- Country: India
- State: Gujarat
- District: Surendranagar

Languages
  - Official: Gujarati, Hindi
- Time zone: UTC+5:30 (IST)
- PIN: 363415
- Telephone code: 02753
- Vehicle registration: GJ-13
- Nearest city: Limbdi
- Civic agency: Chhatriyala Gram Phanchayat

Chhatriyala is a village which is located in Zalawad region of Surendranagar district of Gujarat state of India. This village has two lakes old one and new one. Nearest Railway station is Vejalka Railway Station. Taluka of chhatriyala is chuda. There are in Chhatriyala education available for K.G. students and primary students and also for higher studies students.

In Chhatriyala Village, there are many Hindu castes that live together, like Koli Patel, Kanabi Patel, Bharvad, Mochi, and Luhar.

The main works of Chhatriyala people are farmer and diamond worker.
