= Kidney Hospital =

Hospital in Jalandhar, India

Kidney Hospital (also known as Kidney Hospital & Lifeline Medical Institutions) is located in Waryam Nagar in Jalandhar, Punjab, India. It is a hospital with approx 125 beds and staff of 200 people. It serves in department of Urology, Nephrology, Transplant Surgery and Gastrointestinal Surgery. It was established in 1990. The hospital is an Indian government recognised Renal Transplantation Center.

== Notable doctors ==
- Dr. Rajesh Aggarwal, Limca Book of Records holder for performing 26 Percutaneous nephrolithotomy surgeries in 15 hours.
