= Shamshad Pathan =

Indian human rights lawyer and politician

- Occupations: Human rights activist, advocate, politician
- Organization: Jan Sangharsh Manch
- Political party: All India Majlis-e-Ittehadul Muslimeen, resigned in 2022

Shamshad Pathan is an Indian human rights lawyer and politician based in Ahmedabad. He was affiliated with Jan Sangharsh Manch as an activist, and with the All India Majlis-e-Ittehadul Muslimeen (AIMIM) as the party's Gujarat vice-president.

== Career ==
Pathan represented Muslim victims of 2002 Gujarat riots in several high profile cases. He has represented victims of manuel scavenging and slum-dwellers against eviction bids.

Pathan was attacked with a knife in Jamalpur area of Ahmedabad in March 2022 after he tried to intervene in a fight. He was treated at SVP Hospital.

Pathan resigned from AIMIM in April 2022 alleging that the party's Gujarat state president was taking decision unilaterally and not interested in strengthening the political outfit. A few days later, 21 AIMIM office-bearers from Ahmedabad also resigned from the party.
