= K. K. Aggarwal (cardiologist) =

Indian physician (1958–2021)

Padma Shri Dr. Krishan Kumar Aggarwal
- Born: 5 September 1958; New Delhi, India
- Died: 17 May 2021 (aged 62); New Delhi, India
- Other names: Krishan, Jhepu, Kissu, Dr. KK, KK
- Education: Rashtrasant Tukadoji Maharaj Nagpur University (M.B.B.S.); Mahatma Gandhi Institute of Medical Sciences (M.D.)
- Occupations: Physician and Life Style Interventional Cardiologist
- Awards: Padma Shri; Dr. B. C. Roy Award

Krishan Kumar Aggarwal (5 September 1958 – 17 May 2021) was an Indian physician and senior cardiologist who was President of the Confederation of Medical Association of Asia and Oceania, President of the Heart Care Foundation of India and the Past National President of Indian Medical Association. In 2010, the Government of India honored him with the Padma Shri, India's fourth-highest civilian award, for his contributions to the field of medicine.

== Biography ==
DAggarwal was born on 5 September 1958. He did his MBBS from Nagpur University in 1979 and obtained an MD from the Mahatma Gandhi Institute of Medical Sciences in 1983. He was a senior consultant at Moolchand Medcity, New Delhi, India, until 2017.

During his career, Aggarwal served as the Honorary Secretary General of the Indian Medical Association (IMA), Chairman of the IMA Academy of Medical Specialties, National Honorary Finance Secretary of the IMA, director of the IMA's AKN Sinha Institute, president of the Delhi Medical Association, President of the IMA's New Delhi branch and chairman of the International Medical Sciences Academy's Delhi chapter. He taught at the Delhi Institute of Pharmaceutical Sciences and Research as a visiting professor. He was the national president of the Indian Medical Association and chief editor of IJCP Group. He was appointed the president of "Confederation of Medical Association of Asia and Oceania" in September 2019. He also served as the Vice Chairman of World Fellowship of Religion.

Aggarwal published books on health including Alloveda in which he combined ancient Vedic medicine with modern allopathy. He contributed to the International Textbook on Echocardiography with six chapters on echocardiography. He has around 14 publications in international journals such as The American Journal of Cardiology and Circulation; and 115 publications in the Indian journals such as the Indian Heart Journal, The Journal of the Association of Physicians of India and the Indian Journal of Heart Research.

He had claimed that the Indian epic Mahabharata offers answers to many psychiatric issues and Lord Krishna was India's first counsellor. He was honored with the Dr. B. C. Roy Award in 2005. He has also received the "Vishwa Hindi Samman", "National Science Communication Award", "FICCI Health Care Personality of the Year Award", "Dr D S Mungekar National IMA Award" and the "Rajiv Gandhi Excellence Award". In 2010, he received the Padma Shri Award.

Aggarwal was criticized for justifying Prime Minister Narendra Modi's call to light lamps during the first wave of the COVID-19 pandemic.

== Death ==
In May 2021, Aggarwal's family announced that he was undergoing treatment for a COVID-19 infection in Delhi. Aggarwal died on 17 May 2021, in New Delhi from COVID-19.
