= Janak Desai =

Indian urologist

Dr. Janak Desai
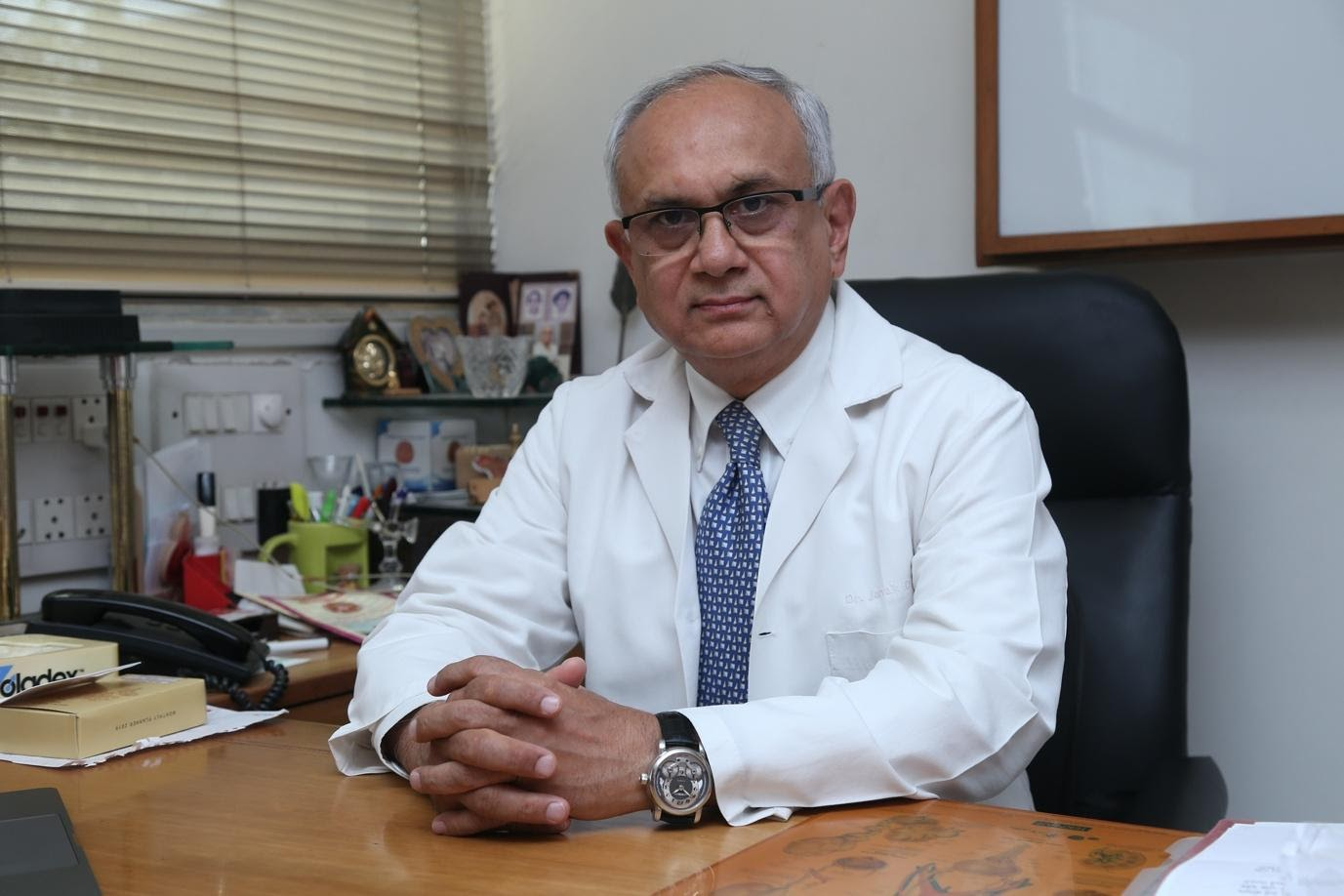
- Born: Janak Dinkarrai Desai; Ahmedabad, Gujarat, India
- Occupations: Urologist, Samved Hospital
- Known for: Founder, Samved Urology Hospital
- Spouse: Shefali Desai
- Website: www.samvedurology.com

Janak D. Desai is an Indian urologist best known for developing the technique of Ultra-Mini PCNL which involves kidney stone removal by a minimally invasive key-hole technique which reduces the blood loss, pain, and hospitalization for a patient suffering from kidney stone. He is the recipient of the B. C. Roy Award given by the President of India and an honorary FRCS by the Royal College of Surgeons in Glasgow. He is also a recipient of the John Wickham Medal & lecture by the Royal Society of Medicine-Urology Section.

== Early life ==
Janak Dinkarrai Desai was born at Surat, Gujarat, India. He has one sibling and two children. He was a university topper in pre-science and then went on to do medical studies at B. J. Medical College, Ahmedabad. He did his post-graduation in General Surgery and specialization in Urology (M.Ch) from B. J. Medical college and Civil Hospital, Ahmedabad. He went to Germany (Mainz) to learn about ESWL and PCNL, then he went to Long Island Jewish Hospital, US for a rotating fellowship in endourology.

== Career ==
Desai started the first ESWL Center in Ahmedabad in 1988 and consequently added endourology to the service for treating kidney stone patients. He has performed more than 10,000 kidney stone operations. He went on to become the founding president of the Gujarat Urology Association and President of the West zone section of Urology Society of India. He was also the chief of Uro-Oncology service of Gujarat Cancer & Research Society and pioneered Radical Prostatectomy in the state of Gujarat. He is credited and recognized in the world for developing UMP (Ultra-Mini PCNL) in partnership with a German Company named Schoelly GmbH. The UMP instruments are patented and have a CE certification and FDA approval from USA.

== Recognition and awards ==
For his contribution in the field of Urology, Desai was awarded the B. C. Roy Award in 2014, by the President of India. He was presented an Honorary FRCS in 2018 by the Royal College of Physicians & Surgeons of Glasgow. He was an honorary corresponding member of the DGU (German Urology Association) in 2017 and was presented with an oration by the Royal Society of Medicine, Urology Division, London, in the years 2012 and 2018. He was given the Presidents Gold medal by The Urology Society of India in 2019 and also the Presidents Gold medal by the West Zone Section of USI in 2018. In February 2024, Dr. Janak Desai was awarded the John Wickham Medal & lecture by the Royal Society of Medicine, London. This is the highest award by the Royal Society-Urology section.

== Contribution to urology ==
Desai conceived the idea of UMP, the Miniaturisation of PCNL, which was embraced by the urology community across the world. He has published a chapter on "Small Caliber PCNL" in the Textbook of Endourology (Smith's Textbook of Endourology – 4th Edition). Desai delivered the 'Malcolm Coptcoat Lecture" in the British Urology Society-Endourology section annual meeting in 2012.
