= New Socialist Movement =

Political party in Gujarat, India

There is also a New Socialist Movement (Mexico).

New Socialist Movement is a political party in the state of Gujarat in India. It was formed by the leadership of Jan Sangharsh Manch and Gujarat Trade Union Federation following the 2002 Gujarat violence. Amrish Patel is the party general secretary. The party was registered with the Election Commission of India in 2007.

== History ==
NSM's leadership comprises activists of the trade union movements that organized the employees of the research, development, training and educational institutes in the 1980s. In 2011, the party chairman was Mukul Sinha (d. 2014), the founder of PRL Employees Union formed in 1979. The general secretary Amrish Patel is the secretary of Gujarat Mazdoor Sabha.

== Electoral performance ==
The party's chairman Mukul Sinha contested Gujarat Assembly elections in 2007 from a Muslim-dominated seat Shahpur in Ahemdabad, but got 255 (0.44%) votes, losing his deposit. In 2012, Sinha contested as an independent candidate from Sabarmati in Ahemdabad, and lost again, securing 1860 (1.23%) votes.
