= Alt News =

Indian fact-checking website

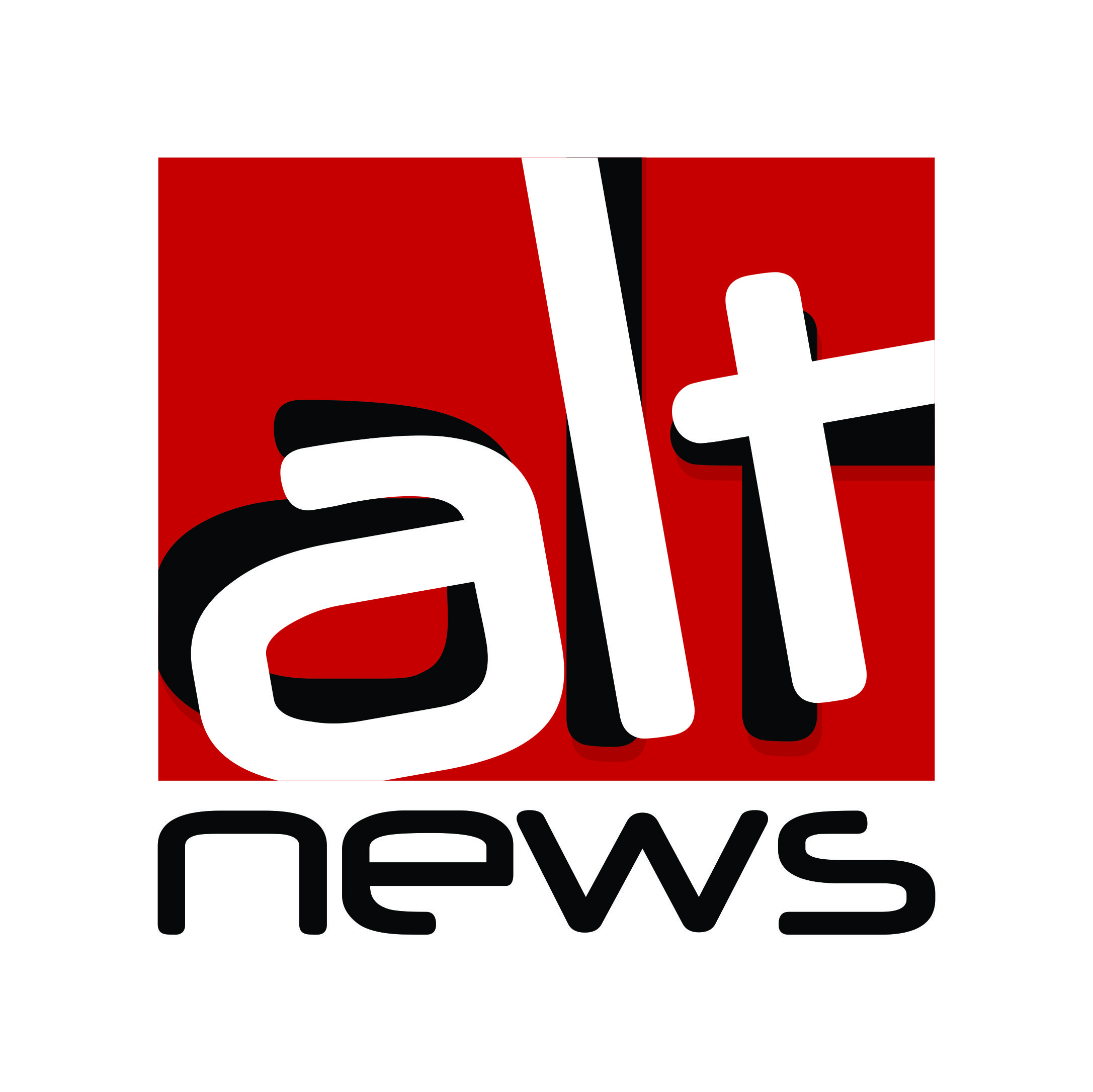
- Available in: English; Hindi
- Founded: 2017
- Headquarters: Ahmedabad, India
- Owner: Pravda Media Foundation
- Founders: Pratik Sinha; Mohammed Zubair
- Products: Web portal
- Website: www.altnews.in
- Current status: Active

Alt News is an Indian non-profit fact checking website founded and run by former software engineer Pratik Sinha and Mohammed Zubair. It was launched on 9 February 2017 to combat fake news. Alt News was a signatory partner of the International Fact-Checking Network until April 2020.

== History ==
Alt News was founded in Ahmedabad by Pratik Sinha, a former software engineer and son of Mukul Sinha, who was a lawyer and the founder-president of Jan Sangharsh Manch. Pratik Sinha became interested in exposing fake news when he began working with his activist parents in India. He had followed the rise of fake news as early as 2013 but was moved to start the website after realizing the impact of social media in 2016, when four Dalit boys were flogged for skinning a dead cow in Una, Gujarat. He quit freelancing as a software engineer in 2016 and founded Alt News the next year.

Sinha has allegedly received threats to his life from fugitive underworld don Ravi Pujari, demanding that he stop producing content.

In July 2022, co-founder Zubair was arrested by Delhi Police for allegedly "hurting religious sentiments". The charges under IPC section 295A and section 67 of the IT Act were pressed for a satirical tweet he made in 2018, in which he shared an unedited screenshot from a 1983 Indian comedy film Kissi Se Na Kehna by Hrishikesh Mukherjee. The tweet was complained to be disregarding of Hindu sentiments by an anonymous Twitter user. Journalist bodies, human rights organizations, and the political opposition perceived the arrest as a revenge against his role in the 2022 BJP Muhammad remarks controversy and Alt News' work of fighting disinformation in the society, while noting of diminishing press freedom in Modi's India.

== Process ==
Alt News works by monitoring misinformation, primarily identifying that are sufficiently viral. They use CrowdTangle, a Facebook tool that publishers use to track how content spreads across the internet, for monitoring Facebook pages that have put out misinformation at some point in the past and are on either side of the ideological spectrum. They use TweetDeck, a Twitter management tool to similarly monitor content on Twitter posted by people who have been known to tweet misinformation frequently. They also monitor multiple WhatsApp groups that they have been able to infiltrate and also receive content from users who alert them on social media and WhatsApp.

== Content ==
Alt News identified the individuals running the Hindu right-wing website DainikBharat.org. He also showed that a video allegedly depicting a Marwari girl married to a Muslim man being burnt to death for not wearing a burqah was Guatemalan in origin. According to the BBC, a report by Alt News in June 2017 demonstrating that the Indian Home Ministry had used a picture of the Spanish–Moroccan border to claim it had installed floodlights on India's borders led to the ministry facing online mockery. Sinha has compiled a list of more than 40 of what he describes as fake news sources, most of which he says support right wing views.

The Alt News team wrote a book titled India Misinformed: The True Story published by HarperCollins which was released in March 2019. The book was "pre-endorsed" by Arundhati Roy. In 2017, Sinha was invited to the Google NewsLab Asia-Pacific Summit to discuss potential solutions to fake news.

== Other key people ==
=== Sumaiya Shaikh ===
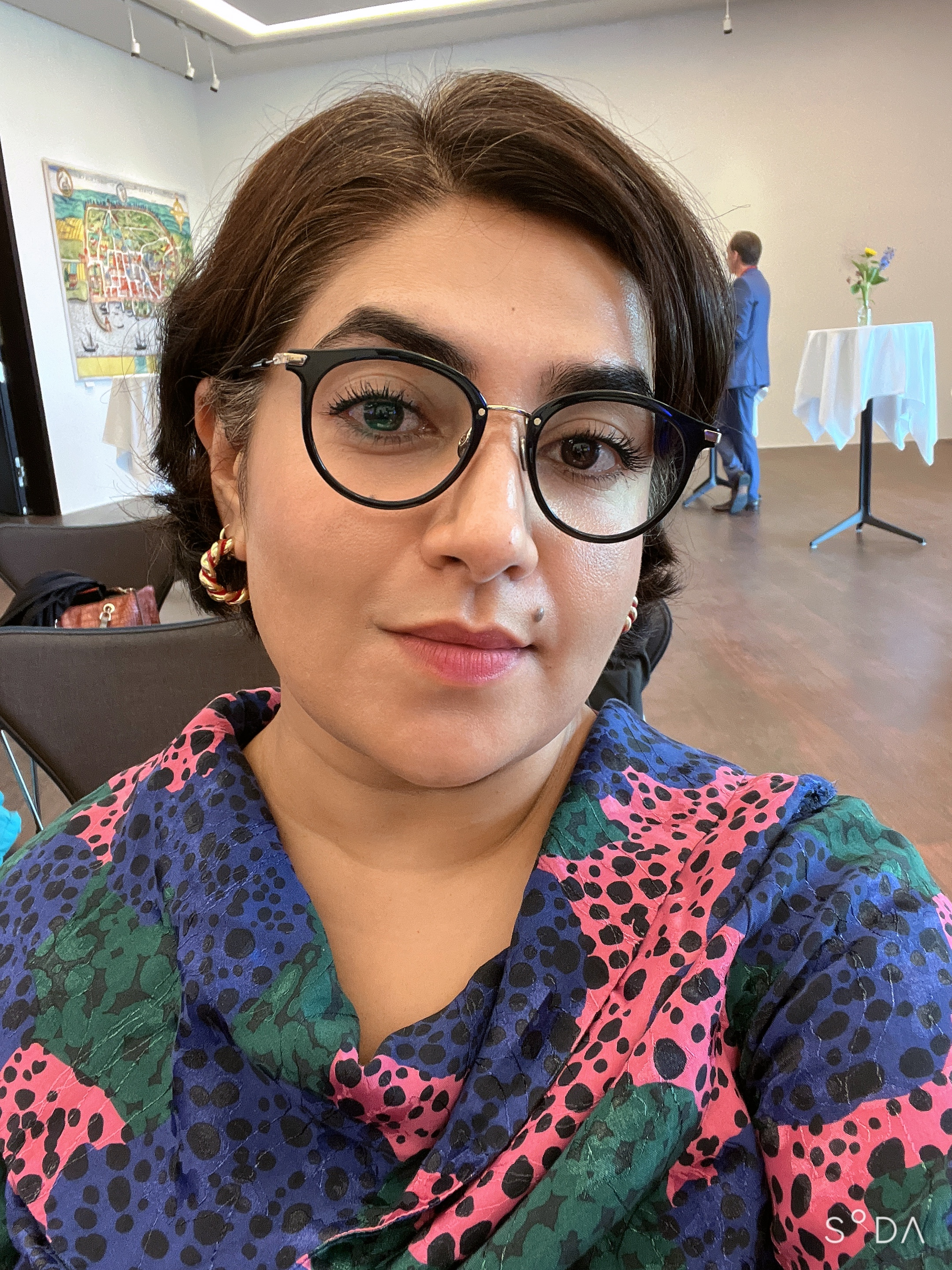
Sumaiya Shaikh in 2022

Sumaiya Shaikh is a neuroscientist who co-founded Alt News in her role as the science editor. Her work has focused on debunking misinformation related to medicine. She wrote a book titled India Misinformed: The True Story with Pratik Sinha of Alt News, which was published by HarperCollins in 2019. Shaikh is the founding director of a Sweden-based organization called ViolEND, which aims to rehabilitate extremists. She has frequently highlighted misinformation related to Ayurveda, including when treatments have been promoted without scientific data.
