= Ketan Desai (urologist) =

Indian Urologist

Dr. Ketan Desai is an Indian urologist from Gujarat. He was head of Medical Council of India in 2001 when he was removed for corruption. Desai began teaching at B.J. Medical College, Ahmedabad following his graduation in 1983 and served as head of the urology department from 2005 until his resignation in 2010. He was president of the Indian Medical Association from 2001—2003 and the World Medical Association for the year 2016/2017.

== Early life and education ==
Desai was raised in Gujarat’s Maroli village. He completed his school graduation from Hansraj Morarji Public School, where his father Dirubhai Desai was a teacher for the primary section. After school, he completed his MBBS and M.Ch in urology in the year 1983 from B.J. Medical College, Ahmedabad.

== Career ==
In 1983, Desai became a professor in the urology department at B.J. Medical College in Ahmedabad after graduating from the school earlier that year. Desai was president of Gujarat Medical Council in the 1990s. He was appointed head of urology at B.J. Medical College from 2005 until his resignation in 2010.

In 2001, while Desai was head of the Medical Council of India (MCI), he was removed for corruption after the High Court of Delhi found him guilty of corrupt practices and abuse of power. He served as president of the Indian Medical Association (2001—2003) and Dental Council of India.

Desai returned to the MCI in 2007 and was again appointed president in 2009. In 2007 and 2009, he also ran for president of the World Medical Association (WMA). Desai was to be inaugurated in late 2010 but was arrested on 23 April 2010 and jailed on charges of corruption for conspiring to extract a 20 million rupee bribe from officials at Gian Sagar Medical College in the northern state of Punjab.

His medical practitioner's license was suspended by the MCI on 9 October 2010.

Desai became syndicate and senate member of the Gujarat University in November 2010 with most of the time uncontested. In 2013, the Gujarat University senate unanimously nominated him to the MCI, though he did not join. In late 2014, he participated in a public rally with health minister J. P. Nadda of the Bharatiya Janata Party.

He served as president of the WMA for the year 2016/2017.

Desai is a longtime member of Gujarat Medical Council. Desai is practicing urologist as of 2025. Gujarat all-India conference recognized him as diamond patron.

== Conspiracy and corruption allegations ==
While serving as president of the MCI, Desai was arrested by the Central Bureau of Investigation (CBI) on 22 April 2010. Desai, alleged middle-man J. P. Singh and doctors Sukhwinder Singh and Kanwaljit Singh were booked under the Prevention of Corruption Act. The CBI recovered 1.5 kg of gold and 80 kg of silver from Desai's premises. Further, gold worth ₨ 35 lakhs were recovered from Desai's bank lockers in Ahmedabad. Following Desai's arrest, the MCI was dissolved by the President of India on 15 May 2010. However MCI continued to operate until it was fully abolished by the government on 25 September 2020 and replaced by the National Medical Commission.
