= Section 295A of the Indian Penal Code =

Indian hate speech and blasphemy law

Section 295A of the Indian Penal Code, 1860 or Section 299 of the Bharatiya Nyaya Sanhita, 2023 lays down the punishment for the deliberate and malicious acts, that are intended to outrage religious feelings of any class by insulting its religion or religious beliefs. It is one of the hate speech laws in India. This law prohibits blasphemy against all religions in India.

Section 295A is a cognisable, non-bailable, and non-compoundable offence. Legal experts consider Section 295A a controversial provision. They believe that there are good legal arguments for the court to revisit and consider overruling the constitution bench judgement in Ramji Lal Modi v. State of UP.

== History ==
Section 295A of the Indian Penal Code (IPC) was enacted in 1927 by the British Parliament.

A book, Rangila Rasul, was published in 1924. The book concerned the marriages and sex life of Muhammad. On the basis of a complaint, the publisher was arrested but later acquitted in April 1929 because there was no law against insult to religion. The publisher was murdered in Court by Ilm-ud-din. As a result, Ilm-ud-din was honored with the honorifics 'Ghazi' and 'Shaheed'. As the book did not cause enmity or hatred between different religious communities, it didn't violate Section 153A (promoting enmity between different groups). The Indian Muslim community demanded a law against insult to religious feelings. Hence, the British Government enacted Section 295A. The Select Committee before enactment of the law, stated in its report that the purpose was to punish persons who indulge in wanton vilification or attacks upon other religions or their religious figures. It however added that a writer might insult a religion to facilitate social reform by grabbing attention. Therefore, it recommended that the words with deliberate and malicious intention be inserted in the Section.

== Text ==
Deliberate and malicious acts, intended to outrage religious feelings or any class by insulting its religion or religious beliefs – Whoever, with deliberate and malicious intention of outraging the religious feelings of any class of citizens of India, by words, either spoken or written, or by signs or by visible representations or otherwise, insults or attempts to insult the religion or the religious beliefs of that class, shall be punished with imprisonment of either description for a term which may extend to three years, or with fine, or with both.

== See also ==
- Blasphemy
- Desecration
- Sacrilege

== Notable cases ==
- In 2022, Nupur Sharma, a spokeswoman of India's ruling party, Bharatiya Janata Party (BJP), made "controversial remarks" about the Islamic prophet Muhammad, on a Times Now debate on the Gyanvapi Mosque dispute. This led to the 2022 Muhammad remarks controversy after which she was booked under Section 295A, 153, 153A but not arrested.
- In July 2022, Alt News, an Indian fact checking site's co-founder Mohammed Zubair was arrested by Delhi Police for allegedly "hurting religious sentiments". The charges under IPC section 295A and section 67 of the IT Act were pressed for a satirical tweet he made in 2018, in which he shared an unedited screenshot from a 1983 Indian comedy film Kissi Se Na Kehna by Hrishikesh Mukherjee.
