= Chitrakoot =

Chitrakoot may refer to these places in India:

- Chitrakoot Dham, city in Uttar Pradesh, mentioned as the first forest of exile of Rama in the Indian epic Ramayana
  - Chitrakoot division, a division of Uttar Pradesh, centred on the city
  - Chitrakoot district, a district of Uttar Pradesh, headquartered in the city
  - Chitrakoot Airport
  - Chitrakoot Express, a mail/express train of Indian Railways
  - Chitrakoot, Uttar Pradesh Assembly constituency
- Chitrakoot, Madhya Pradesh, a municipality in Madhya Pradesh, India
  - Chitrakoot, Madhya Pradesh Assembly constituency
- Chitrakoot Falls, a waterfall on the Indravati River, Chhattisgarh, India
- Chitrakoot Colony, a neighbourhood in west Jaipur, Rajasthan, India

== See also ==
- Chitrakoot Assembly constituency (disambiguation)
- Chittor Fort (formerly Chitrakut(a)), fort in Chittorgarh, Rajasthan, India
  - Chittorgarh, the city in Rajasthan
  - Chittorgarh district, district in Rajasthan containing the city
    - Chittorgarh (Rajasthan Assembly constituency)
    - Chittorgarh (Lok Sabha constituency)
