= Krishna Heart Institute =

- Shalby Ltd.

Geography
- Location: Ahmedabad, India

Organisation
- Type: Specialist

Services
- Speciality: Heart disease

History
- Opened: 2000

Links
- Lists: Hospitals in India

The Krishna Heart and Super Specialty Institute, also known as Krishna Heart Institute or Krishna Hospital, located in Ahmedabad, India, was established in 2000 as a high-end medical facility, specialising in heart diseases. The hospital expanded its field of work into different medical branches and has performed over 25,000 procedures including 4,000 bypass surgeries. The hospital was acquired by Shalby Ltd. in 2012. It is a facility that seeks to gain income from the increase seen in medical tourism in India.

== History ==
Krishna Hospital was the first corporate hospital to be located in Ahmedabad. It was conceived by Dr. Atul Chokshi, an interventional cardiologist practising in New York City, his brother Animesh Chokshi and 100 other doctors, most of them living in the United States. Dr. Chokshi being a devote of the Hind deity Krishna and a reader of Bhagavad Gita, named the establishment "Krishna Heart Institute".

Krishna Hospital is partnered with MedSolution, a medical tourism company located in Vancouver, British Columbia, Canada. It was built with a capacity of 140 beds and specialised operating theaters.

=== Acquisition by Shalby ===
The number of patients treated by Krishna Hospital declined. In October 2012, Shalby Ltd. announced that they had acquired 86% of the share in Yogeshwar Healthcare Ltd. which ran the Krishna Hospital. The cost of the acquisition was not revealed, but was speculated to be around ₹75 crore (US$7.8 million)-₹80 crore (US$8.3 million). Krishna Hospital would now serve as a place to direct the over-flow of the patients from Shalby hospital. A plan to renovate the hospital was passed and 110 beds were to be added to the 140-bed hospital.

== Facilities and treatments ==
Krishna Hospital, has some patients from the local areas of North Gujarat, Saurashtra and Rajasthan, but also markets its services to foreign nationals. It provides diagnostic and treatment procedures in cardiology and joint replacement.

The hospital provides:

- Angiography
- Angioplasty
- Coronary bypass surgery
- Joint replacement for hip and knee
- Plastic and reconstructive surgery
- Oncosurgery
- Minimally-invasive procedures

The institute was the first hospital in the local area to set up a specialised ISO-100 operating theatre, where the air in the operating theatre is refreshed 130 times per hour. As of 2010, Krishna hospital is reported to have performed over 25,000 procedures including 4,000 open heart bypass surgeries.
