= Vikram I. Shah =

Indian orthopedic surgeon

Dr. Vikram I. Shah
- Born: 13 November 1962 (age 63)
- Occupation: Joint replacement surgeon (orthopedic)
- Notable work: Zero Technique
- Spouse: Dr. Darshini Shah
- Website: drvikramshah.com

Vikram I Shah is an Indian orthopedic surgeon in Ahmedabad and healthcare entrepreneur. Shah is the Founder, Chairman & Managing Director of Shalby Hospitals, established in 1994 .

Shah is known for his contributions to the field of joint replacement surgeries. his contributions in the field of joint replacement have been recognised through B C Roy International Award. He is the only Indian surgeon to be selected on the Board of Designers of Zimmer Inc., USA.

== Early life and education ==
Vikram I. Shah obtained his M.S. in orthopedics in India after completing his studies at Byramjee Jeejeebhoy Medical College (B J Medical College) in Ahmedabad. Following the completion of his masters' degree in 1989, he sought out advanced international training in Joint replacement.

He spent two years at Ormskirk Hospital & Wrightington Hospital in the United Kingdom and continued his specialized education in Switzerland and Germany. He completed his fellowship under Brice Brackin at the Shelby Medical Centre in Birmingham, Alabama, US.

== Career ==
Shah has studied MBBS and MS Orthopedic in Ahmedabad. After which, He worked in Ormskirk and Wrightington Hospital, England, for two-and-a-half-years.

He returned to India in the year 1993 and established his first medical center in Ahmedabad. In the year 1994, he established Shalby Hospitals, as a joint replacement centre. (the new indian express). Shalby Hospitals currently has 16 units with over 2000 beds capacity across India.

Shah has performed over 15,000 successful Knee Surgeries. He carried out 3,000 joint replacement knee surgeries in 2008 alone. Shah developed the ‘OS Needle’ (Orthopedic Surgeons’ Needle) which can pass through both bone and soft tissue easily so that an orthopedic surgeon can finish repairing bone and soft tissues quickly. It is claimed that this invention has greatly reduced the surgical time, from a few hours to 8–10 minutes. When this was not available, surgeons had to use complicated soft tissue procedures in which the failure rate was high and recovery time as longer.

== Notable achievements ==
He achieved a world record by performing 3,000 knee surgeries in a single center in the year 2008. In 2012 Shah developed the "zero" technique for TKR, which he claims further reduces the operating time to 7–10 minutes.

== Personal life ==
Shah is married to Darshini Shah who is a dentist specializing in cosmetic dentistry and dental implants.

== Awards and recognitions ==
- Dr. Vikram Shah got awarded as the “Healthcare Entrepreneur of the Year” by Hurun, a United Kingdom headquartered organization.
- Dr. Vikram Shah was awarded the prestigious ‘Healthcare Personality of the Year Award 2023’ by Federation of Indian Chambers of Commerce and Industry (FICCI) at the 15th Edition of FICCI Healthcare Excellence Awards.
- Dr. Shah received 2014: Gujarat Innovation Society’s Hercules Award for the innovation of “Zero” technique for Joint Replacement Surgeries.
- Received B C Roy International Award for joint replacement surgery in 2003.
- Award from Johnson & Johnson for invention of the OS needle.
- Award for outstanding work in the medical field by the Ahmedabad Medical Association during its 103rd annual meeting in Ahmedabad, India.
- Dr. Vikram Shah was conferred with the prestigious doctorate “D. Sc.” (Honoris Causa), by IIS University, Jaipur, India in 2019.
