= Chitrakoot Assembly constituency =

Chitrakoot Assembly constituency may refer to these electoral constituencies in India:

- Chitrakoot, Madhya Pradesh Assembly constituency
- Chitrakoot, Uttar Pradesh Assembly constituency

== See also ==
- Chitrakoot (disambiguation)
