= M. C. Bhatt =

Indian human rights lawyer

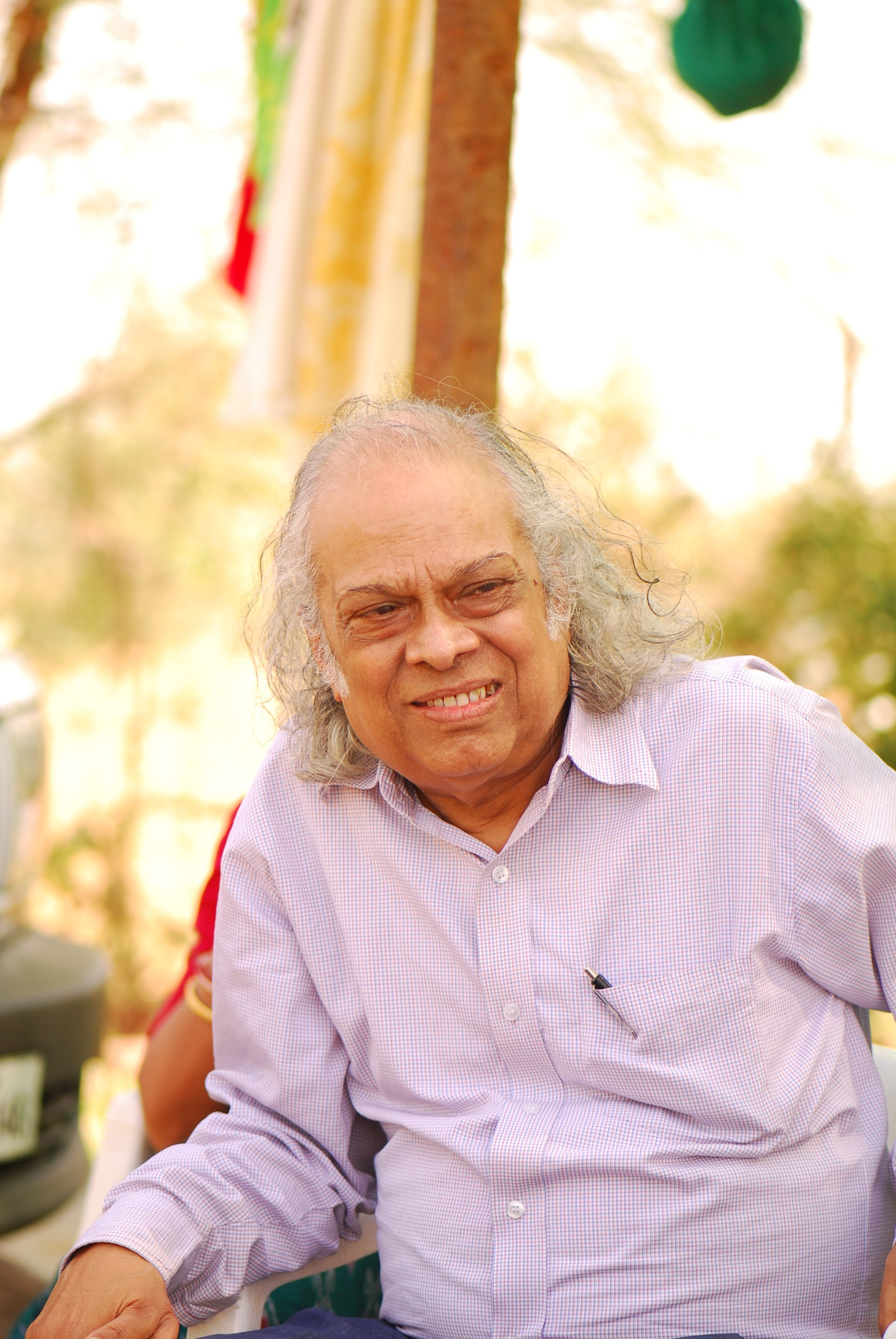
- Born: Mahesh Chandrakant Bhatt; 6 February 1939 (age 87); Dholka, Gujarat, India
- Education: L.L.B.
- Occupation: Advocate
- Spouse: Daksha M. Bhatt

M. C. Bhatt (born 6 February 1939) is an Indian human rights lawyer and activist. He practiced at Gujarat High Court in Ahmedabad from 1962 to 2022.

== Career ==
Concerns were raised in 1980s about lack of appropriate compensation for sugar factory harvest workers in South Gujarat. M. C. Bhatt was appointed court commissioner for inquiry into this matter. His report resulted in payment of minimum wages to 1 lakh 25 thousand migrant workers at 9 sugar factories and set a precedent. Similarly, concerns were raised regarding use of bonded labour at IFFCO. Bhatt conducted inquiry as court commissioner which ultimately resulted in release of the bonded labourers.

The state of Gujarat has experienced communal violence over several decades starting long before the 2002 riots. Bhatt fought for rights of Muslims and provided legal representation.

Industrial development in Gujarat has seen land of small farmers acquired by the state. Bhatt has provided legal representation to small farmers.

The current Chief Justice of Kerala High Court Justice Ashish Jitendra Desai previously worked under the mentorship of Bhatt.

Bhatt has been a close associate of Girish Patel including for work on behalf of those displaced by Sardar Sarovar Dam, and of Mukul Sinha for several rights issues.

Bhatt is a vocal critic of Bharatiya Janata Party.
