= Vaishali Nagar (Jaipur) =

Neighborhood in Jaipur, Rajasthan, India

Vaishali Nagar is a residential and a commercialised neighbourhood located in the southwestern part of Jaipur, Rajasthan. The area includes residential development along with commercial establishments, particularly along major roads. The neighbourhood is geographically bounded by Queens Road to the east, Delhi Bypass to the west, Ajmer Road to the south, and Sirsi Road to the north.

== Amenities ==
Vaishali Nagar functions as a mixed residential and commercial area with access to everyday services. The locality has branches of private and public sector banks, as well as post offices providing postal services. The area includes retail establishments such as local shops, boutiques, and shopping complexes. The Mall of Jaipur, located in the neighbourhood, includes PVR INOX and retail outlets.

== Healthcare facilities ==
Vaishali Nagar is well-equipped with healthcare facilities, making it a convenient location for residents in terms of medical care. The area is home to several well-known hospitals and clinics, offering a wide range of medical services. Notable healthcare institutions in the vicinity include:

- Global Heart Hospital
- Shalby Hospitals
- Amar Jain Hospital

Additionally, the neighbourhood has numerous pharmacies and wellness centres, ensuring that residents have easy access to medical supplies and health-related services.

== Real estate and housing ==
Vaishali Nagar includes a mix of housing types such as apartment buildings, gated communities, and independent houses. Residential development in the area has taken place over different periods. The locality is situated near commercial areas, educational institutions, and healthcare facilities. It is connected to other parts of Jaipur by road networks and public transport. Residential projects, including both existing developments and new constructions, are present in the area.

== Educational institutes ==
- DAV Centenary Public School
- Tagore Public School
- Brightlands Girls School
- Defence Public School
- Jayshree Periwal High School
- Sanskriti School
- Ravinder Bal Bharti
- Blue Star Public School
- Amar Public Senior Sec School
- Sr. Sec. Girls Adarsh Vidhya Mandir

== Religion ==
The area has Jhulelal Mandir (near BSNL office)and a Gurdwara in Vaishali Marg; it also is home to Hanuman Vatika in Hanuman Nagar.

Ram Mandir, Ganesh Mandir, Laxminarain Mandir, and Jharkhand Mahadev Temple are also in this region.
