= Sardar Vallabhbhai Patel Institute of Medical Sciences and Research =

- AMC-Medical Education Trust
- Location in Ahmedabad, Gujarat Sardar Vallabhbhai Patel Institute of Medical Sciences and Research (Gujarat)

Geography
- Location: Ellis Bridge, Ahmedabad, Gujarat, India
- Coordinates: 23°01′09.8″N 72°34′18.0″E

Organisation
- Care system: Government
- Type: General

Services
- Emergency department: Yes
- Beds: 1500

History
- Founded: 17 January 2019

Links
- Website: www.svphospital.com
- Lists: Hospitals in India

SVP Hospital or Sardar Vallabhbhai Patel Institute of Medical Sciences and Research is a public hospital and medical college in Ahmedabad, India. It was inaugurated by the Prime Minister of India, Narendra Modi, on 17 January 2019. The building, consisting of 17 floors, a ground floor, and two basements, was built at a cost of 750 crores by Amdavad Municipal Corporation.

== History ==
The construction of a new multi-specialty hospital was proposed in 2013 under the Chief Minister's Swarnim Shaheri Vikas Yojna with funding of Rs. 331 crore. The proposed location was next to the existing VS Hospital.

== Facilities ==
The hospital features 1,500 beds, 32 operation theaters, 139 ICU beds, 90 consultation rooms, and a helipad for the air ambulance. The hospital utilizes a pneumatic tube system to send samples to laboratories in seconds. It has colleges of physiotherapy, medicine, and nursing.
