= Patel =

Indian surname

Patel is an Indian surname or title, predominantly found in the state of Gujarat, representing the community of land-owning farmers and later (with the British East India Company) businessmen, agriculturalists and merchants. Traditionally the title is a status name referring to the village chieftains during medieval times, and was later retained as successive generations stemmed out into communities of landowners. Circa 2015 there are roughly 500,000 Patels outside India, including about 150,000 in the United Kingdom and about 150,000 in the United States. As of the 2000 U.S. census, nearly 1 in 10 people of Indian origin in the US is a Patel.

== As a title ==
- Patel is a title of the Koli caste of Gujarat in India which has the greatest importance in the Politics of Gujarat. The Koli Patels of Saurashtra benefited the most under the rule of Indian National Congress party. Koli Patels are recognised as an Other Backward Class caste by Government of Gujarat. Koli Patels are agriculturists by profession and own the high landholding in villages. Koli Patels also call themselves as Mandhata Patel and Mandhata Koli Patel and those who have migrated to East Africa are businessmen and civil servants. Some of the well known clans of Koli Patels are Chauhan, Makwana and Rathod.
- Patidars of Gujarat also use the Patel title as traditionally village headmen.
- Parsis, who were biggest herdsman of the village adopted the title of Patel.
- Muslims of Gujarat also use Patel as title who converted from Hindu Kolis and Patidars.

== Etymology ==
The Gujarati term paṭel, along with its cognate Marathi terms pāṭel and pāṭīl, are derived from the Prakrit word paṭṭaïl(l)a- "village headman", itself derived from the Sanskrit word paṭṭakila "tenant of royal land", a term first appearing in the Vetālapañcaviṃśatikā.

== Geographical distribution ==
The surname historically originated in the Indian state of Gujarat, where it is amongst the most common of surnames. Today, the name is found across India, as well as in the Indian diaspora.

In 2009, the British newspaper The Telegraph published an article indicating that, in the United Kingdom, the surnames Patel and Singh now rank amongst native ones such as Smith and Jones.

== See also ==
- List of people with surname Patel
- Patil
- Patil (surname)
