= Percutaneous nephrolithotomy =

Surgical removal of large kidney stones with a nephroscope across the skin

- Specialty: Nephrology

A percutaneous nephrolithotomy (PCNL, PCN, or PNL) is a minimally-invasive procedure to remove stones from the kidney by a small puncture wound (up to about 1 cm) through the skin. It is most suitable to remove stones over 2 cm in size or which are present near the pelvic region. It is usually done under general anesthesia or spinal anesthesia.

Since their development in 2000, PCNLs have become the standard treatment for complex and large kidney stones, and have largely obviated the need for open surgical procedures.

== History ==
Janak Desai developed the ultra-mini PCNL technique.

== Procedure ==
A retrograde pyelogram is first done to locate the stone in the kidney. Contrast is diluted to the ratio of 1:3. If the ureteric catheter is placed in the upper pole of the kidney, it should be pulled down so that the tip is inside the renal pelvis; this helps for proper filling of the renal calyces. The contrast is injected slowly to prevent extravasation. Fluoroscopy monitoring should be continuous so that the sequence of calyces filled can help to identify the position of posterior calyx.

With a small (1 cm) incision in the loin, the PCN needle punctures the skin and is passed into the pelvis of the kidney. The position of the needle is guided and confirmed by fluoroscopic-guided puncture (FP), ultrasonography-guided puncture (UP), or a combination of both referred to as a combined fluoroscopic and ultrasonography-guided puncture (FUP). Fluoroscopy was the only available imaging technique before ultrasonography was introduced in the 1970s. If the puncture is not carefully done, other organs around the kidney may be damaged.

A guide wire is passed through the needle into the pelvis. The needle is then withdrawn with the guide wire still inside the pelvis. Over the guide wire, the dilators are passed and a working sheath is introduced to gain access. The most common standard types of dilation are Amplatz dilation, metal telescopic dilation, and balloon dilation. A nephroscope is then passed inside and small stones taken out. In case the stone is big, it may first have to be crushed using ultrasound probes or via other means.

The most difficult portion of the procedure is creating the tract between the kidney and the flank skin. Most of the time this is achieved by advancing a needle from the flank skin into the kidney, known as the antegrade technique. A retrograde technique has recently been updated wherein a thin wire is passed from inside the kidney to outside the flank with the aid of a flexible ureteroscope. This technique may reduce radiation exposure for both the patient and the surgeon.

== Complications ==
The following complications may take place:

- Injury to the colon
- Injury to the lungs
- Injury to the renal blood vessels
- Urinary leak may persist for a few days
- Infection and sepsis
- Hydrothorax, if done through the 11th intercostal space
- Bleeding
- Death
