= Indian Medical Association =

Society of Indian physicians formed in 1928

- Abbreviation: IMA
- Formation: 1928; 98 years ago
- Headquarters: New Delhi
- Location: Indian Medical Association, IMA House, I.P. Estate, Next to Vikas Minar, New Delhi - 110002
- Region served: India
- Members: 317,458 as of November 30, 2019
- National President: Dr. R. V. Asokan
- Website: www.ima-india.org

The Indian Medical Association (IMA) is a private, national voluntary organisation of physicians in India. It was established in 1928 as the All India Medical Association, and was renamed the Indian Medical Association in 1930. It is a society registered under The Societies Act of India.

== Background ==
The Indian Medical Association has approximately 350,000 member doctors in 1,700 active local branches in 29 states and union territories in India. It is the largest association of medical doctors in India.

Previously stationed out of Calcutta, the IMA is headquartered in New Delhi. Local branches send representatives to a central council which meets annually. The council delegates to a working committee that represents all state branches and meets at least three times a year.

The Indian Medical Association is one of the 27 founder members of the World Medical Association, joining in 1948. The IMA left the organization in 1985 due to the WMA's retention of South Africa, then a practitioner of apartheid. The IMA rejoined the WMA in 1993. A Reuters investigative report from 2015 found that the IMA had incorrectly told the WMA that charges of corruption brought by the Central Bureau of Investigation against former IMA president Ketan Desai had been withdrawn.

The IMA has expressed opposition to integrated medicine or the mixing together of systems of medicine in curriculum, practice and research in India, often by using the term "mixopathy". The IMA has held a number of nationwide protests. These have included several protests between November 2016 and March 2017 that objected to bills raised toward the creation of the National Medical Commission which replaced the Medical Council of India on 25 September 2020. In December 2020, approximately one million doctors attended a day-long strike organized by the IMA to protest a federal government rule that allows practitioners of the Indian system of medicine Ayurveda to perform minor surgeries. In early 2021, the IMA held a two-week nationwide hunger strike to protest the government's support for surgical training for postgraduate students of Ayurveda.

In 2022, Sahajanand Prasad Singh was listed as the national president for the organization. Singh was preceded in the post by surgeon J. A. Jayalal from 2020 to 2021. Longtime member and cardiologist K. K. Aggarwal held several posts within the IMA including president. Ketan Desai served as the organization's head from 2001 to 2003 following a period when he had been found guilty by Delhi High Court of corrupt practices and abuse of power.

== Office Bearers of IMA since Inception ==
- Bidhan Chandra Roy (1929–30)
- Nilratan Sircar (1931–32)
- Prem Aggarwal (June 1996 to 2000)
- Ketan Desai (2001–2003)
- K. K. Aggarwal (2014–2016)
- R. V. Asokan (2024–Incumbent)

== Journal of the Indian Medical Association ==
The Journal of the Indian Medical Association, (JIMA), is indexed in the Index Medicus. Published monthly, JIMA has over 240,000 subscribers for its electronic version and is also available in microfilm through Bell & Howels, US. JIMA was founded in 1930 by Sir Nilratan Sircar, Bidhan Chandra Roy, Kumud Sankar Ray, and others in Calcutta.

== See also ==
- Indian Council of Medical Research
