= Transradial catheterization =

Endovascular or catheterization procedure

- Purpose: diagnose arterial disease

Transradial catheterization is an endovascular procedure or catheterization procedure performed to diagnose and treat arterial disease (e.g., coronary artery disease, peripheral artery disease, etc.). Endovascular procedure can be performed achieving access in to body's arterial system from either femoral artery (in groin), brachial artery (in elbow) or radial artery in the wrist. The transfemoral (through groin) approach to perform cardiac catheterization has typically been more prevalent in invasive cardiology. But radial access has gained popularity due to technical advances with catheters and lower complication rates than transfemoral access. The European Society of Cardiology and the American Heart Association both support a radial-first approach in acute coronary syndrome.

== History ==
In 1948, Radner published one of the first descriptions of transradial central arterial catheterization and attempts at coronary artery imaging using radial artery cut-down. Transradial access to perform diagnostic cardiac catheterization procedures was introduced by Campeau and was later adapted for therapeutic procedures of coronary angioplasty by Kiemeneij and Laarman.

In past few years, transradial access for coronary intervention has become increasingly popular. The most advantageous aspect is very low access-site bleeding complications even with aggressive use of anticoagulation and antiplatelet therapies. During the angioplasty and stent procedures patients are given therapeutic (high) doses of anticoagulation (blood thinners) and platelet inhibiting medications.

== Characteristics ==
With transfemoral access, the rate of bleeding complications is 3% - 6%. Occasionally, patients can develop retroperitoneal bleeding (bleeding into the pelvic cavity), and up to 1% of patients require blood transfusion to treat the bleeding complication after transfemoral catheterizations. Patients may also develop painful hematoma, A-V fistula or pseudoaneurysms. In modern interventional cardiology the procedural success rates are high and ischemic complications are relatively rare. However the bleeding complications associated with transfemoral catheterization have not been significantly reduced even after the introduction of new pharmacological strategies. There is strong evidence suggesting that post-PCI bleeding is associated with an adverse prognosis. Postprocedural blood transfusion is also associated with poor prognosis. Bleeding complication, pseudoaneurysm, hematoma formation are less than 2% with transradial catheterization. Possibility of blood transfusion requirement is extremely rare after transradial catheterization.

The other reason for the increased use of radial access is the technological advances in the sheath and catheter design, and improved physician experience with this approach. With improvement in the physician's experience, radial artery access is now being used with equal efficacy to treat almost every complex coronary artery disease, including acute myocardial infarction, chronic total occlusion, bifurcation coronary artery disease and rotablation. Radial access has also been used successfully to treat peripheral artery disease including bilateral iliac artery stenosis, renal artery stenosis and for carotid interventions.

Due to rapid ambulation post procedure the radial interventions became particularly attractive for patients with back pain, chronic obstructive lung disease, prostatic hypertrophy and elderly patients. As after catheterization through femoral approach patient is generally required to lay flat with immobilization of the leg for 4– 6 hours. Early ambulation and early discharge after transradial catheterization improves quality of life and reduces morbidity. Both patients and hospital staff typically strongly prefer the transradial approach as opposed to femoral access.

In era of cost control, the savings in closure devices (which are used to allow earlier ambulation after transfemoral catheterization), and early discharge had made this a cost-saving approach. Some of these savings are outweighed by a relatively long learning curve for physicians, which has likely slowed the adoption of the procedure in the U.S.

Although transradial procedures often have less complications than femoral procedures, they have some shortcomings. The procedure is technically more difficult and has a relatively long learning curve, which includes the potential for unsuccessful completion of procedure during said learning curve. In clinical trials before crossing the learning curve there is up to 5% failure in completing the catheterization successfully from radial approach. Technical difficulties are because of loops and tortuosity of the radial and the subclavian artery, anatomical variations in radial artery, and radial spasm.

Major complication associated with a transradial interventions include early and late radial artery occlusion. Most of the radial artery occlusions are asymptomatic. Post PCI radial artery occlusion can be reduced by using smaller diameter catheters and anticoagulation. Also by avoiding prolonged compression of the radial artery and applying just enough pressure to achieve hemostasis reduces this complication of asymptomatic radial occlusion significantly. Implying this approaches the radial artery occlusion rate has come down to 1.1-1.8%.

The transradial technique is an effective, minimally invasive approach to perform coronary and peripheral angiograms and interventions. Transradial catheterization is typically a safer, more cost-effective and patient friendly procedure. Studies show a lower rate of complications with transradial than with transfemoral catheterization in non-coronary interventions as well.. However, for women, the rate of complications may be about equal between transradial and transfemoral catheterization.

== See also ==
- Cardiac catheterization
