= Kissi Se Na Kehna =

- Promotional Poster
- Directed by: Hrishikesh Mukherjee
- Written by: Sachin Bhowmick (screenplay); D.N. Mukherjee (story); Rahi Masoom Raza (dialogue)
- Produced by: Jaywant Pathare; Ashok Raut
- Starring: Farooq Shaikh; Deepti Naval; Utpal Dutt
- Music by: Bappi Lahiri
- Release date: 8 July 1983
- Country: India
- Language: Hindi

Kissi Se Na Kehna (transl. Don't Tell Anyone) 1983 Indian Hindi-language romantic comedy film directed by Hrishikesh Mukherjee. It stars Farooq Shaikh, Deepti Naval and Utpal Dutt.

== Synopsis ==
Kailash Pati, a very devotional widower, lives a retired life spending time complaining about the ways of the new generation. To save his only son from getting spoiled, he decides to get him married. In this endeavour, he meets westernized girls. Disappointed, decides he would get his son married to girl who does not speak English and is traditional in all ways.

His son, Ramesh, on the other hand, is in love with a well-educated girl, Dr. Ramola Sharma. Torn between Father and his Love, Ramesh goes to Lalaji, his father's friend for help. Lalaji suggests to trick Kailash Pati, by portraying Ramola as a daughter of village pundit.

The trio succeed in tricking Kailashpati to believe that Ramola is indeed an innocent girl who does not know English. They are married and then starts a storm of events to live the lie.

Ramola is the dutiful wife and daughter in law much to Kailash Pati's joy who believes that it is all because of her upbringing in a village atmosphere. Ramola is constantly on her nerves and feels guilty of her masquerade.

She is finally exposed when she has to use her training as a doctor to save Kailash Pati's life. Kailash Pati realizes that he has been deceived by her and Ramola decides to leave the house.

Finally Kailash Pati's friend Lalaji and son explain him the circumstances and show him the wrong beliefs about educated girls that he had been harbouring for so long.

Things are finally reconciled and they start living their lives together.

== Cast ==
- Farooq Shaikh as Ramesh Trivedi
- Deepti Naval as Dr. Ramola Sharma/Rama
- Utpal Dutt as Kailash Pati
- Saeed Jaffrey as Lalaji (Arun Lal)
- S.N. Banerjee as Om Prakash
- Prema Narayan as Vaijayanti Aiyar
- Deven Verma as Mansukhlal
- Ketki Dave as Shyamoli
- Lalita Kumari as Mrs. Lalaji
- Asha Sharma as Dolly's mother

== Soundtrack ==
All lyrics are written by Yogesh. Music by Bappi Lahiri.

Song	Singer
"Dhundhe Yashoda"	Asha Bhosle
"Kaahe Jhatke Itne Mare Nagin"	Asha Bhosle, Bappi Lahiri
"Kisi Se Na Kahana"	Asha Bhosle
"Phoolon Tumhe Pata Hai"	Asha Bhosle
"Tum Jab Se Jeevan Mein"	Asha Bhosle

== Controversy ==
Scenes from the film became the subject of political and religious controversy in India in 2022 centring on journalist Mohammed Zubair. In 2018, Zubair shared a satirical tweet with a screenshot from the 1983 Indian comedy film Kissi Se Na Kehna by Hrishikesh Mukherjee. The screenshot (Note: The tweets can be seen at: meghnad (Nerds ka Parivaar) (27 June 2022), Here's what Delhi police is acting on, Twitter) from the film showed a signboard with the name "Honeymoon Hotel" repainted to "Hanuman Hotel".

On 19 June 2022, an anonymous Twitter user named "Hanuman Bhakt @balajikijaiin" quoted Zubair's tweet from four years earlier, and asked Delhi Police to take action against him, calling it a "direct insult" to Hindus.

On 27 June, Zubair was arrested by Delhi Police after being accused of "hurting religious sentiments". The charges under Section 295A of the Indian Penal Code and section 67 of the IT Act were pressed against Zubair. He was then brought before a magistrate, who granted the police one day custody. Vrinda Grover, Zubair's lawyer, asserted that while many social media users tweeted the same message, only Zubair was targeted by police. Grover also alleged that Zubair was a target of police because of his Muslim faith, name, and profession. On 28 June, Zubair was placed in four days of police custody for interrogation. The police seized his electronic devices.
