= Panchyawala (Jaipur) =

- Location within Greater Jaipur Location within Rajasthan Location within India
- Coordinates: 26.91546°N 75.71706°E
- Country: India
- State: Rajasthan
- District: Jaipur

Panchyawala is a residential and semi-urban locality situated on the western outskirts of Jaipur, Rajasthan, India. Over the past two decades, it has experienced rapid urban expansion due to Jaipur's outward growth, improved road connectivity, and the development of nearby residential colonies and educational institutions. The area is positioned near the Ajmer Road (National Highway 48), which provides direct connectivity to central Jaipur as well as neighbouring towns and industrial zones.

== History ==
Traditionally, Panchyawala functioned as a village settlement with agriculture as the primary occupation. Like many peripheral settlements around Jaipur, it began integrating into the urban economy in the late 20th and early 21st centuries. The expansion of Jaipur's municipal limits, combined with infrastructure projects and private housing developments, contributed to demographic growth and a gradual shift from agrarian livelihoods to service-sector and small-business employment.

== Education and amenities ==
The locality and its surroundings host a range of schools, coaching institutes, and higher-education campuses. Proximity to established educational hubs along Ajmer Road has made Panchyawala attractive to students and families. Retail shops, small markets, and eateries cater to daily needs, while larger shopping and entertainment facilities are accessible within a short drive toward central Jaipur.

=== Schools in Panchyawala ===
- B.P. Convent School
- Teoler High School
