= B. J. Medical College, Ahmedabad =

Medical college in Ahmedabad, Gujarat, India

B. J. Medical College
- Type: Public medical college
- Established: 1871; 155 years ago
- Founder: Byramjee Jeejeebhoy
- Affiliations: National Medical Commission
- Academic affiliations: Gujarat University
- Dean: Dr. Minakshi Parikh
- Undergraduates: 250 per year
- Location: Asarwa, Ahmedabad, Gujarat, India; 23°03′09″N 72°36′11″E
- Website: www.bjmcabd.edu.in

Byramjee Jeejeebhoy Medical College, popularly known as B. J. Medical College (BJMC), is a public medical college situated in Ahmedabad, Gujarat, India. It is attached with the Ahmedabad Civil Hospital, within whose complex it is located.

== History ==
The Ahmedabad Medical School was established in 1871. It had 14 students that were educated in hospital assistant training. Businessman Byramjee Jeejeebhoy donated ₹20,000 in 1879 to expand its facilities, and the school was renamed as B. J. Medical School. In 1917, the school became affiliated to the College of Physicians & Surgeons of Bombay. By 1946, the school had obtained an affiliation with the University of Bombay and achieved higher status, allowing it to become a certified medical college that could offer a Licentiate Certified Physician and Surgeon (LCPS) degree. In 1951, it became affiliated to the Gujarat University and began offering undergraduate courses, and its postgraduate courses received a Gujarat University affiliation in 1956.

=== Crash of Air India Flight 171 ===
On 12 June 2025, Air India Flight 171 crashed into the college, killing 241 out of the 242 people on board, and 19 on the ground, most ground fatalities being within the college. The crash caused severe damage to the dining hall and hostels (dormitories). Tata Group, the parent company of Air India, committed to repairing the damaged buildings.

== Institutions ==
- Civil Hospital, Ahmedabad
- Women & Children Superspeciality Hospital.
- M & J Institute of Ophthalmology
- The Gujarat Cancer & Research Institute
- TB Demonstration and Training Centre
- U.N. Mehta Institute of Cardiology
- Institute of Kidney Disease Research Institute
- Government Spine Institute
- Institute of Organ Transplantation
- Manjushree Kidney Hospital

== Notable alumni ==
- Tejas Patel, cardiologist
- Hargovind Laxmishanker Trivedi, nephrologist, immunologist and transplant surgeon
- A. K. Patel, politician and physician
- Ketan Desai, urologist
- Janak Desai, urologist
- Rajni Kanabar, Tanzanian doctor and philanthropist
- Kirit Premjibhai Solanki, surgeon and politician
