= Mohammed Zubair (journalist) =

Indian journalist and fact-checker

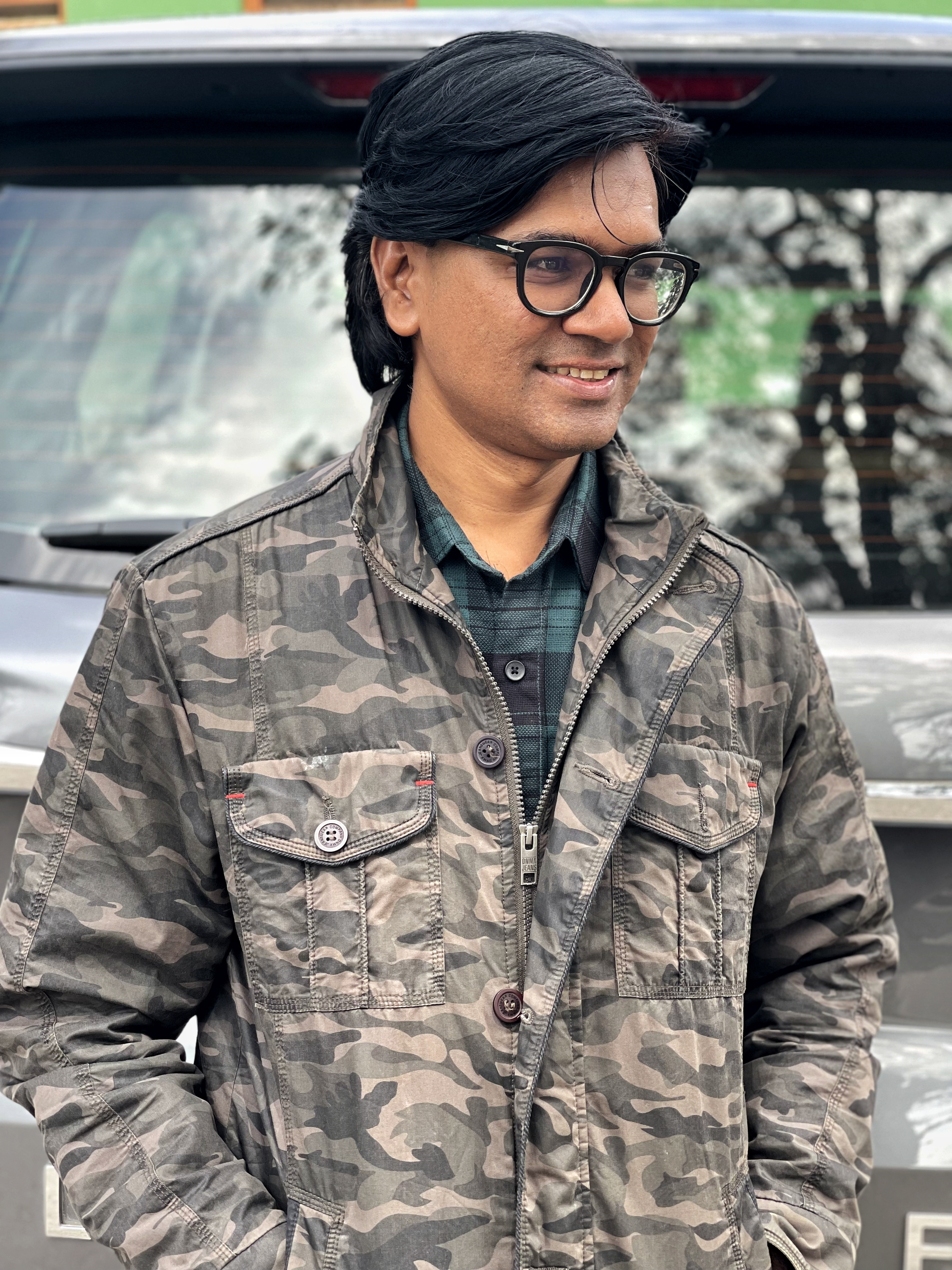
- Zubair in 2023
- Born: 29 December 1983 (age 42); Bangalore, Karnataka, India
- Education: MSRIT
- Occupation: Journalist
- Organization: Alt News
- Title: Co-founder of Alt News

Mohammed Zubair (born 1983) is an Indian journalist, fact-checker and the co-founder of Alt News, an Indian non-profit fact-checking website.

In 2022, Zubair was arrested by Delhi Police over a 2018 tweet for allegedly "insulting Hindu religious beliefs" and incarcerated for a month. His detention raised further concerns about the state of India's press freedom under Narendra Modi's premiership and was widely criticised by journalistic bodies, human rights organisations and the political opposition who allege that the arrest was an act of revenge against his role in Alt News's work of combating disinformation.

== Early life ==
Zubair was born into a Muslim family on 29 December 1983 in Bangalore, the capital of Karnataka, India. He graduated from the M.S. Ramaiah Institute of Technology, and spent over ten years working as a software engineer for Nokia.

== Journalism career ==
=== Alt News ===
In 2017, Zubair and fellow former software engineer Pratik Sinha founded Alt News, a non-profit organisation. Zubair only assisted Sinha in running the site for about a year while continuing to work for Nokia. He finally left Nokia in September 2018 to become a full-time employee of Alt News. On 16 December 2019, he was appointed to the board of directors of the Pravda Media Foundation, which operates Alt News.

=== Targeted by right wing ===
In 2020, Pratik Sinha alleged that Zubair is being targeted by right wing government for his work after a number of first information reports (FIR) were lodged against him. On 10 June 2021, Zubair received a notice from Twitter alerting him that Twitter had been approached by Indian law officials regarding a tweet Zubair had tweeted in March 2021, which Indian authorities claimed breached Indian laws.

=== Nobel Peace Prize ===
According to Time magazine, Zubair and his Alt News co-founder, Pratik Sinha, were among the favourites to win the Nobel Peace Prize in 2022.

=== 2022 Muhammad remarks controversy ===
The 2022 Muhammad remarks controversy began on 27 May 2022, when Nupur Sharma, a spokeswoman of India's ruling party, Bharatiya Janata Party (BJP), made controversial remarks about the Islamic prophet Muhammad, on a Times Now television channel debate on the Gyanvapi Mosque dispute. The comments were in reference to Muhammad and the alleged age of his third wife, Aisha, at the time of their marriage and the consummation of the marriage.

A day later, the video clip of her comments was shared by Zubair on social media. Sharma later alleged that it was a "heavily edited and selected video", which was denied by Pratik Sinha, who stated that it was unedited and also shared a longer clip which allegedly showed the same remarks. Times Now deleted the video of the programme from its YouTube channel the next day. Nonetheless, Sharma defended her comments and accused Zubair of "heavily [editing]" the clip; she further claimed to have been receiving rape and death threats as a result. Alt News denied any responsibility for the reaction from the viewers after watching the video clip.

Deutsche Welle reported that Zubair had helped bring international attention to the controversial remarks. A few days later, he was arrested in other cases.

== Legal issues ==
=== Hindutva extremist tweet case ===
On 27 May 2022, Zubair published a series of tweets slamming prime-time debates on Indian television channels during the ongoing controversy regarding the Gyanvapi mosque. Zubair said that these debates "have become a platform to encourage hate mongers to speak ill about other religions". He added that the Indian TV anchors were doing a better job of speaking against a religion than the hatemongers Yati Narasinghanand Saraswati or Mahant Bajrang Muni or Anand Swaroop.

The extremist Hindutva leaders—Mahant Bajrang Muni 'Udasin,' Yati Narsinghanand, and Anand Swarup—had been recorded on camera using hate speech, instigating violence against Muslims, and making rape threats against Muslim women.

An FIR was filed in Khairabad, Sitapur, Uttar Pradesh in early June in response to a complaint by a Sitapur leader of a Hindu group. The complainant accused Zubair of "outraging religious feelings" of three seers by labelling them "hatemongers" on Twitter.

In mid-June, Zubair posted e-mails from the Twitter service informing him that one of his tweets criticising the comments by Yati Narsinghanand Giri the leader of a Hindu group were being 'withheld' in India under the country's IT laws at the request of law enforcement authorities. 'Withholding' a tweet meant that it would no longer be visible in India. Twitter said this was done "in order to comply with Twitter's obligations under India's local laws". Later two more of Zubair's tweets were withheld, they were about the provocative comments made by a Hindu priest Mahant Bajrang Muni threatening to kidnap and rape Muslim women.

On 14 June, Zubair challenged the FIR and pleaded in the Lucknow Bench of the Allahabad High Court that his tweet did not insult or attempt to insult religious beliefs and the case against him had been lodged to 'harass' him. After hearing a plea on the case, the High Court refused to quash the FIR and said that the case needed investigation and adjudication by a trial court.

In mid-July, Zubair challenged the order of Allahabad High Court in the Supreme Court of India. Solicitor General Tushar Mehta argued against the plea and admitted "We accept that the speeches made by Yati Narsinghanand were hate speech for which he was arrested and put in jail".

On 7th October 2024, Udita Tyagi, a temple associate of Yati Narsinghanand filed an FIR against Zubair for “inciting" muslims to "attack" the temple after he tweeted about Yati Narsinghanand ’s derogatory remarks against the Prophet Muhammad. The UP police invoked section 152 of BNS which is about an “act endangering unity, sovereignty and integrity of India” in the FIR against Zubair. A petition to quash the FIR and interim relief was filed in the Allahabad High court.

=== June 2022 arrest ===
In 2018, Zubair shared a satirical tweet with a screenshot from the 1983 Indian comedy film Kissi Se Na Kehna by Hrishikesh Mukherjee. The screenshot (Note: The tweets can be seen at: meghnad (Nerds ka Parivaar) (27 June 2022), Here's what Delhi police is acting on, Twitter) from the film showed a signboard with the name "Honeymoon Hotel" repainted to "Hanuman Hotel".

On 19 June 2022, an anonymous Twitter user named "Hanuman Bhakt @balajikijaiin" quoted Zubair's tweet from four years earlier, and asked Delhi Police to take action against him, calling it a "direct insult" to Hindus.

On 27 June, Zubair was arrested by Delhi Police after being accused of "hurting religious sentiments". The charges under Section 295A of the Indian Penal Code and section 67 of the IT Act were pressed against Zubair. He was then brought before a magistrate, who granted the police one day custody. Vrinda Grover, Zubair's lawyer, asserted that while many social media users tweeted the same message, only Zubair was targeted by police. Grover also alleged that Zubair was a target of police because of his Muslim faith, name, and profession. On 28 June, Zubair was placed in four days of police custody for interrogation. The police seized his electronic devices.

==== Reactions to the arrest ====
Journalist bodies, human rights organisations, and the political opposition perceived the arrest as a revenge against Zubair's role in reporting on the 2022 Muhammad controversy and Alt News's work of fighting disinformation and noted the case as exemplary of diminishing press freedom in India under Modi.

Retired Indian Supreme Court judge, Justice Deepak Gupta noted that in 40 years since the release of the comedy film, nobody had raised objections to the photo, tweeted by Zubair, for which he was arrested. Gupta compared Nupur Sharma who had not been arrested yet for her statement with arrest of Zubair questioning the fairness of police. Gupta expressed surprise at the quick investigation by the police on a complaint by an anonymous account when lodging complaints was difficult. He said that police or a magistrate cannot authorise a 'fishing inquiry' where questions that are not connected to the subject matter of a case are asked.

The Editors Guild of India issued a statement demanding immediate release of Zubair and cited PM Narendra Modi's commitment at G7 meeting in Germany "to ensure a resilient democracy by protecting online and offline content". Guild noted that Alt News's "alert vigilance" was resented by "those who use disinformation as a tool to polarise the society and rake nationalist sentiments". DIGIPUB, a body of digital news media organisations had condemned Zubair's arrest and demanded the Delhi Police immediately withdraw the case against him. It stated, "In a democracy, where every individual possesses the right to exercise the freedom of speech and expression, it is unjustifiable that such stringent laws are being used as tools against journalists, who have been accorded the role of playing watchdog against the misuse of institutions of the state".

The Wire published an investigation report on the targeting of Zubair by "years-long campaign by a network of anonymous and inauthentic accounts linked to Vikash Ahir, state president of the Hindu Yuva Vahini (HYV) and co-convenor of the Bharatiya Janata Yuva Morcha (BJYM) in Gujarat". It noted the simultaneous court proceedings in the two cases and said that Zubair was being targeted by Hindutva brigade as Zubair had been vocal against the communal issues spread by the Hindu fundamentalist groups under the patronage of the ruling Bharatiya Janata Party (BJP).

Zubair's detention sparked worries about the state of India's press freedoms, which are deteriorating.

==== International reactions ====
Stéphane Dujarric, the spokesperson for UN chief Antonio Guterres, while responding to a question at the daily news briefing in the United States, talked about Zubair's arrest and said, that, "In any place around the world, it is very important that people be allowed to express themselves freely, journalists be allowed to express themselves freely and without the threat of any harassment…Journalists should not be jailed for what they write, what they tweet and what they say. And that goes for anywhere in the world, including in this room."

Germany has expressed worry over the detention of Mohammed Zubair and stated that it has been in touch with other EU members over the detention's continuation. In response to a query regarding Zubair's arrest, the spokeswoman for the German Foreign Office had stated on 6 July 2022: "Journalists should not be persecuted and imprisoned for what they say and write," "We are indeed aware of this specific case and our embassy in New Delhi is monitoring it very closely. We are also in contact on this with our EU partners on the ground. The EU has a human rights dialogue with India, and freedom of expression and freedom of the press are a focus of those discussions with India. India describes itself as the world's largest democracy. So one can expect democratic values like freedom of expression and freedom of the press to be given the necessary space there."

=== Sudarshan TV fact checking case ===
On 9 July, Zubair was in jail under judicial custody when he was granted bail in the case filed in Sitapur. The same day a warrant was issued against him in an old case filed in Uttar Pradesh's Lakhimpur Kheri. This case was filed in September 2021 by an employee of TV channel Sudarshan News, objecting to a tweet by Zubair fact checking a video published by Sudarshan News. Zubair had noted that Sudarshan News used images of Al-Masjid an-Nabawi from Madina and superimposed it on an old picture from Ghaza, with graphics of missiles bombing the mosque, during a broadcast. Zubair questioned if this was reporting or inciting violence.

Following the complaint by Sudarshan News, a Police case was filed arguing that Zubair's tweet could promote enmity between religious groups. A warrant was issued, and he was summoned by the Lakhimpur Kheri court on 11 July. Following his arrest in the Lakhimpur Kheri case, Zubair was sent to 14 days in judicial custody.

On 16 July 2022, a court in Uttar Pradesh rejected Zubair's petition for bail in connection to a FIR that was filed against him in 2021 for allegedly inciting animosity. After the court sentenced Zubair to a 14-day judicial detention in the case, the bail application was brought before Additional Chief Judicial Magistrate Mohamaddi on 11 July.

=== Bail ===
Every time Zubair applied for bail, fresh cases were filed against him, and his detention was extended. The Supreme Court (SC) called this a "vicious cycle" of interim bail in one case and arrest in another case. On 20 July 2022, the Supreme Court granted him bail in all the seven cases filed against him. The bail would also apply if new cases on the same incident are filed. SC transferred all the cases filed in Uttar Pradesh to Delhi and disbanded the Special Investigation Team formed by the Uttar Pradesh government to investigate cases against Zubair.

SC said, Zubair was "trapped in a vicious cycle of criminal process where the process itself has become the punishment," and warned that arrest "cannot be used as a punitive tool". The detailed judgment in the case had a series of extremely strong remarks. "Arrest is not meant to be and must not be used as a punitive tool because it results in one of the gravest possible consequences emanating from criminal law: the loss of personal liberty." and added "Individuals must not be punished solely on the basis of allegations, and without a fair trial... When the power to arrest is exercised without application of mind and without due regard to the law, it amounts to an abuse of power".

The Uttar Pradesh government had asked the court that Mohammed Zubair be "stopped from putting out tweets". The court refused to place any such order for restrictions against Zubair and said, "The imposition of such a condition would tantamount to a gag order... (which) have a chilling effect on the freedom of speech".

=== Muzaffarnagar school incident ===
On 28 August 2023, Muzaffarnagar police registered a case against Mohammed Zubair for posting a video on social media of the incident of a Muslim boy who was slapped by his classmates on the instructions of a school teacher. He later deleted it, under Section 74 of the Juvenile Justice Act. Zubair told Indianexpress, "... Why was only my name put there? There were several media outlets who posted the video before and after me. I later removed the video after I was told that I was disclosing the minor’s identity. I was targeted…This shows police can target anyone."

However, he has not been contacted by police on the matter.

== Awards ==
- On 26 January 2024, the Government of Tamil Nadu conferred Zubair with the Kottai Ameer Communal Harmony Award, on the occasion of the Indian Republic Day celebrations.
