= Kevin Patel =

American climate justice activist (born 2000)

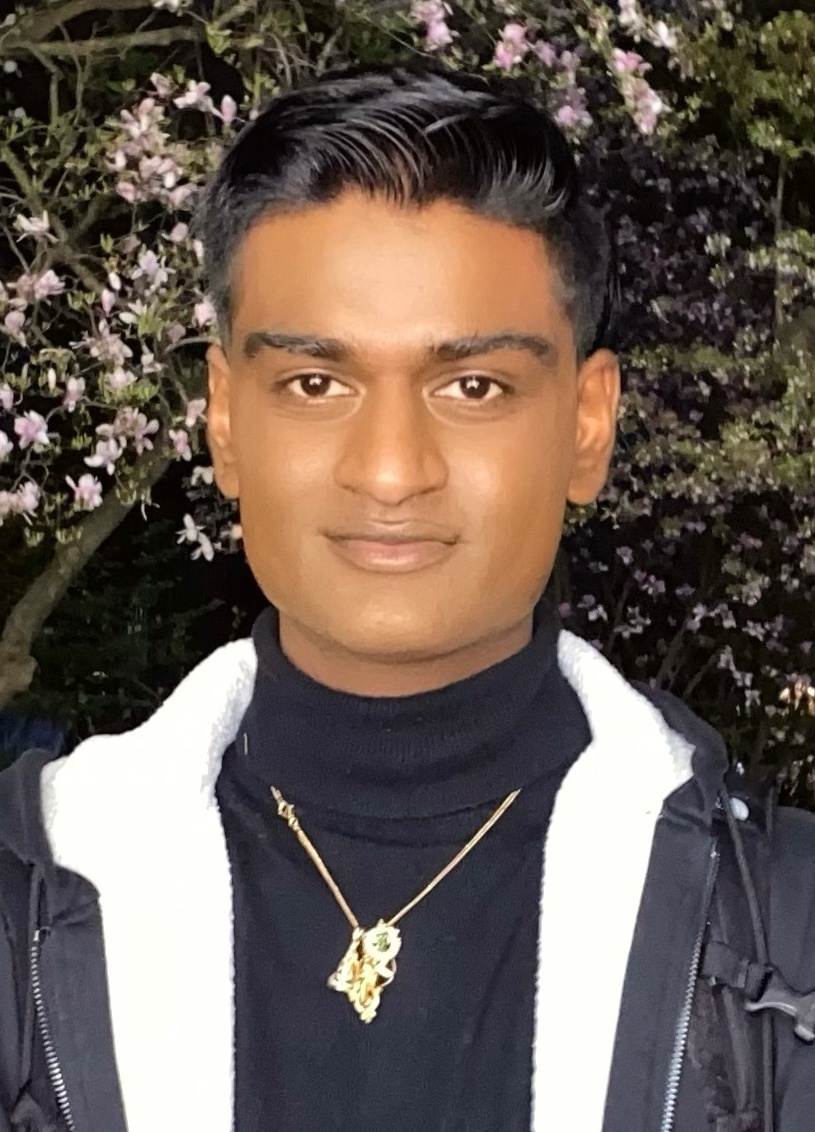
- Patel in 2021
- Born: Kevin J. Patel; September 23, 2000 (age 25); Los Angeles, California, U.S.
- Education: Loyola Marymount University
- Occupations: Climate justice activist, student
- Organization: OneUpAction
- Movement: School Strike for Climate, Environmental Movement
- Website: https://oneupaction.org/

Kevin J. Patel (born September 23, 2000) is an American climate justice activist and community organizer. Patel has discussed his experience as a climate activist with respiratory issues. He is the founder and executive director of OneUpAction, an American nonprofit that provides youths with climate activism resources.

== Early life and education ==
Kevin J. Patel lives with his father, mother, and older brother, in Los Angeles, California. He grew up in South Central Los-Angeles. He has studied at Carver Middle School, where he first began his advocacy. He then went to Santee Education Complex, where he started the first environmental club. In 2019, he was involved in the Youth Climate Strike L.A. He was a leader in Fridays for Future Southern California. As of 2020, Patel was starting his second year at Loyola Marymount University where he is studying Political Science. In 2021, he participated in a panel "Taking Action for People and the Planet."

== Activism ==
In 2012, Patel was involved in activism concerning food inequalities in South Los Angeles at Carver Middle School. Later in 2013, he was diagnosed with irregular heartbeat/heart palpitations which he claims is partially due to Los Angeles’ poor air quality.

In 2019, he founded OneUpAction International. OneUpAction describes itself as an intersectional youth-led activist organization working to provide resources to youth advocates.

He was involved in creating the first Youth Climate Commission in Los Angeles County.

Patel is a United Nations Togetherband Ambassador for Sustainable Develop Goals 13 & 14 and a National Geographic Young Explorer. Patel serves on the Youthtopia World Circle of Youth Council, Climate Power Advisory Council, World Economic Forum's 1 Trillion trees U.S. Stakeholder Council, and the Intersectional Environmentalist Council.

In 2024, Kevin Patel joined the advisory board of Climate Words, a climate education and communication organization.
