= Healthcare in Ahmedabad =

Healthcare in Ahmedabad is provided through several hospitals and medical colleges – both government and private. In addition to providing healthcare to the Gujarat population, Ahmedabad also focuses on medical tourism and in 2009 received about 1,500 visitors from outside the state, including some from abroad.

== Ahmedabad Civil Hospital ==
Opened in 1953, Ahmedabad Civil Hospital is the largest hospital in Asia. Civil Hospital is housed in a sprawling 110-acre (0.45 km^{2}) area, has 2,800 beds facility, where over 1.3 million patients are treated and nearly 80 thousand surgeries performed annually. It also has autonomous kidney, cancer, heart, eye, paraplegia, dental and TB hospitals located on the same campus, if all are taken into account, the number of beds goes up to 3,500. A proposal has been drawn up by Gujarat government to seek World Bank aid for a nine-storey 2,000-bed building on Civil Hospital premises, raising its capacity to 4,800 beds – making it the world's largest hospital.

== Sheth Vadilal Sarabhai General Hospital (VS Hospital) ==
VS Hospital is a multi-activity and multi-specialty hospital, which was the vision of Vadilal Sarabhai. The hospital was founded in year 1931 with an initial capital of 400,000 Rupees. It has 1,115 beds and is run by AMC and a committee consisting of members of the Sarabhai and Chinai families who had donated the hospital to the city. Over 500,000 patients are treated here annually, averaging 1,600 patients a day. Also 25,000 surgeries are performed every year. Plans are underway to expand the hospital capacity by building two new towers which will increase capacity by 2000 beds. The hospital caters to areas in and around Ahmedabad with an average radius of 180 kilometers. Being near to the national highway, VS hospital is the center for significant trauma management. Moreover, it is the only government hospital in Ahmedabad which caters to vascular injuries (limb salvage). It has a significant patient input by emergency 108 services in Ahmedabad. On 17 Jan 2019, Prime Minister of India, Narendra Modi, inaugurated Sardar Vallabhbhai Patel Institute of Medical Science and Research, a 17-floor building built at cost of 750 crore by Ahmadabad Municipal Corporation, that features 1500-bed, 32 high class operation theaters, 139 ICU-beds, 90 consultation room and a helipad for air-ambulance.
