= Girishbhai Patel =

Indian human rights lawyer (1932–2018)

Girish Patel
- Born: Girish Chhotalal Patel; 5 December 1932; Nadiad, Gujarat, British India
- Died: 6 October 2018 (aged 85); Ahmedabad, Gujarat, India
- Education: Harvard University (L.L.M.)
- Occupation: Advocate
- Organization: Lok Adhikar Sangh
- Spouse: Kusumben Patel
- Awards: Bhagirath Human Rights Award

Girish Patel (5 December 1932 – 6 October 2018) was an Indian human rights lawyer, academic and constitutional expert.

== Early life and education ==
Patel studied at a municipality school, then completed L.L.B. in 1956 before earning L.L.M. at Harvard Law School in the United States.

== Career ==
Patel practiced at International Court of Justice, then upon return to India served as principal of Maneklal Nanavati Law College in Ahmedabad, as member of Gujarat University Senate, and as member of the Gujarat State Law Commission.

Patel founded Lok Adhikar Sangh in 1977, and under its banner fought cases on behalf of Dalits, tribals, minorities, women, child workers, bonded labourers and farm workers. He practiced at Gujarat High Court from 1975 for over 40 years. He provided pro bono service to most of his clients.

Patel filed over 200 Public Interest Litigations (PILs).

Patel specialised in jurisprudence and the philosophy of law. His mentees coined the term Girishprudence.

Patel, along with M. C. Bhatt, provided legal assistance to Narmada Bachao Andolan and worked closely with Medha Patkar.

Patel was awarded Bhagirath Human Rights Award in 2002.

== Death and legacy ==
Patel died at his home in Ahmedabad in 2018 due to age-related complications. His body was donated per his wishes. His death was received with sadness by civil society. Girish Patel Smarnanjali Lecture Series has been instituted to honour his memory. Dalit leader and Gujarat MLA Jignesh Mevani worked under the mentorship of Patel.
