= Jayshree Periwal High School =

Coordinates: 26.899279°N 75.735711°E

- Jaipur, Rajasthan

Information
- Principal: Madhu Maini
- Slogan: Rest Not Till You Reach
- Song: We the students of JPHS

Jayshree Periwal High School is a CBSE-affiliated school based in Jaipur, Rajasthan, India, and is a part of the Jayshree Periwal Group of Schools. The academic directors of the school are Ayush Periwal and Akriti Periwal and the chairperson of the school is Dr. Jayshree Periwal.

The school was originally named Step By Step High School and was subsequently changed to Jayshree Periwal High School in 2015, after its director Jayshree Periwal. The school teaches to a CBSE syllabus.

== History ==
The school was founded by Jayshree Periwal in April 2002 as a middle school, under the name "Step by Step".

== Courses, Campus and Facilities ==
The school offers courses in Science, Commerce and Humanities. It teaches students from pre primary to Grade 12. The campus is situated in sector 2 of Chitrakoot Scheme.

The campus offers a range of facilities like science laboratories, basketball courts, badminton courts and a football ground to students (to be noted the school uses a government facility that is for public use and is not owned by the school).
