= Mukul Sinha =

Indian human rights activist (1951 – 2014)

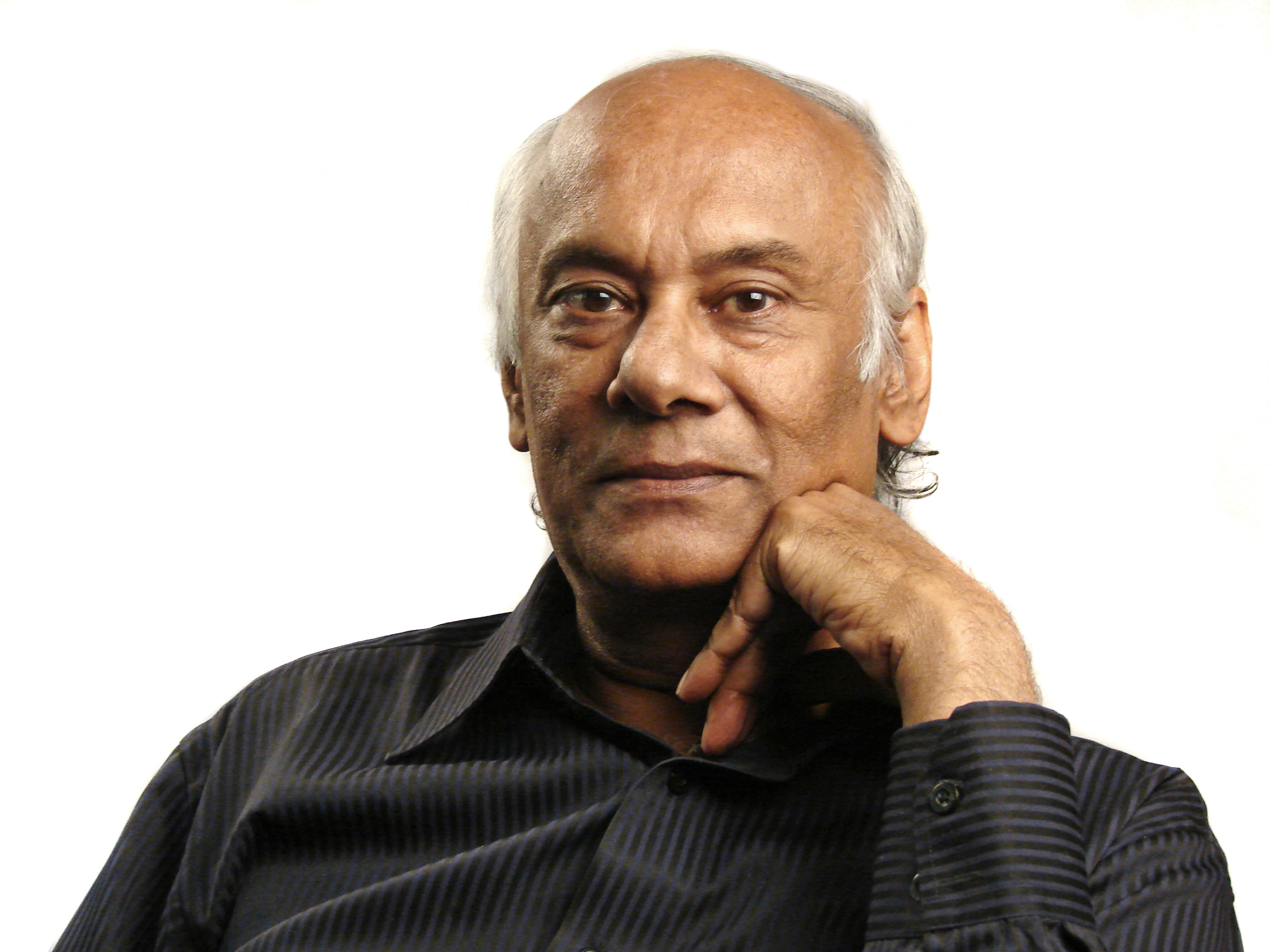
- Born: 10 February 1951; Calcutta, West Bengal, India
- Died: 12 May 2014 (aged 63); Ahemdabad, Gujarat, India
- Education: IIT Kanpur
- Occupations: physicist; human rights lawyer; civil rights lawyer
- Spouse: Nirjhari Sinha
- Children: Pratik Sinha

Mukul Sinha (10 February 1951 – 12 May 2014) was an Indian human rights activist and a lawyer at the Gujarat High Court in Ahemdabad. He was an active trade union leader and a trained physicist. He legally represented the families of the individuals who were killed in Gujarat following the 2002 riots and in Manipur, in which he secured convictions of the politicians and police officers involved. Along with his wife Nirjhari Sinha, he founded and served as the president of Jan Sangharsh Manch (trans. People's Struggle Forum), an independent civil rights organization with the aim of addressing issues of labour and workers rights. He was also a vocal critic of erstwhile Gujarat Chief Minister Narendra Modi.

== Early life and education ==
Mukul Sinha was born in Kolkata on 10 February 1951. After completing his undergraduate studies in Bilaspur, Chhattisgarh, he studied at IIT Kanpur where he received a master's degree in physics.

== Career ==
Sinha joined the Physical Research Laboratory (PRL) in Ahmedabad in 1973 for doctoral research.

He became involved with social activism after the expulsion of workers at PRL in 1978. He organized the workers to fight for their rights, founding the Federation of Employees of Autonomous Research and Development, Education and Technical Institutes (FEARDETI), although this cost him his job in 1979.

=== Jan Sangharsh Manch ===
Subsequently, Sinha obtained a degree in law in 1988 and joined the Gujarat High Court as an advocate in 1989. He co-founded Jan Sangharsh Manch in 1990 under the aegis of the New Socialist Movement and organized a group of lawyers and individuals from different professions to work pro-bono on various issues of the general public ranging from trade-unions, housing, environment, natural calamities, and civil rights. The group represented the 2002 Gujarat violence victims and legally fought the Gujarat state government, in the Shah-Nanavati inquiry. The organisation has also fought for justice to the families of the victims in the fake encounter cases and exposed claims of the police and Modi's government branding them as terrorists to the public. The legal interventions by the organisation led the Supreme Court in the Sohrabuddin Sheikh case to pass the investigation from the Gujarat police to the Central Bureau of Investigation. This set a precedent as all the other cases taken up by JSM were handed over to the CBI and the investigation in all these cases established them as extrajudicial killings. His recommendations made after the 2001 Bhuj earthquake, titled "Kutch Quake Profile", resulted in an injunction from the court to incorporate earthquake-resistant structures in the state of Gujarat.

=== 2002 Gujarat riots ===
Gujarat experienced large scale communal violence and riots in 2002. With Jan Sangharsh Manch, he participated in the Nanavati-Mehta Commission appointed by the Government of Gujarat to seek justice for the victims. As a party to the lawsuit, he managed to obtain mobile phone 'call data records' (CDR) submitted by Indian Police Service officer Rahul Sharma. A thorough analysis of these records enabled lawyers, activists and victims to cite the CDRs as evidence, implicating a number of political leaders and police officers. The CDRs of Maya Kodnani and Babu Bajrangi were crucial evidence in corroborating the testimonies of Naroda Patiya massacre victims. Finally, the special court convicted them for their role in the riots.

=== Electoral politics ===
Mukul Sinha contested elections for the Gujarat Legislative Assembly in 2007 as a candidate from his own political party, the New Socialist Movement, and in 2012 as an independent candidate. He contested the 2007 elections from Shahpur, a constituency where Muslims formed the majority of the population, and the 2012 elections from Sabarmati in Ahmedabad. He lost both elections, securing only a few votes.

== Death and legacy ==
Sinha died of lung cancer on 12 May 2014. He is survived by his wife Nirjhari Sinha and their son Pratik Sinha, who runs the fact-checking portal AltNews.in. According to his wishes, his body was donated to Ahmedabad Civil Hospital for cancer research.

Journalist Rana Ayyub wrote an obituary for Sinha, remembering her personal loss and his legacy. He was posthumously awarded the second Bhagirath Human Rights Award (BHRA) by the Bhagirath Memorial Fund Committee set up at the Centre for Social Studies (CSS), Veer Narmad South Gujarat University, Surat. Activist Jignesh Mevani worked under Sinha's mentorship before becoming MLA from Vadgam, Gujarat.
