= Shalby Hospitals =

Shalby Hospitals - Multi Specialty Hospitals

Geography
- Location: Opp. Karnavati Club, S. G. Road, Ahmedabad, Gujarat, India
- Coordinates: 23.019021°N 72.506649°E

Organisation
- Care system: Public multi-specialty hospitals
- Type: Specialist
- Patron: Vikram I. Shah

Services
- Standards: NABH, NABL
- Beds: 200 (Over 2000 in 11 hospital units)
- Speciality: Joint replacement

History
- Opened: 1994

Links
- Website: www.shalby.org
- Lists: Hospitals in India

Shalby Hospitals is a multispecialty hospital with facilities in various locations. The hospital was first started in Ahmedabad as a joint replacement centre in 1994 by Dr. Vikram Shah. Shalby today, runs a chain of 14 multispecialty hospitals in Ahmedabad, Rajkot, Surat, Vapi, Indore, Gwalior, Jabalpur, Jaipur, Lucknow, Ranchi and Mohali.

== History ==
The hospital, located in Ahmedabad, was established in 1994 by Dr. Vikram Shah as a small six-bedded single specialty unit that offered total knee replacement (TKR) surgery.

== Shalby Hospital ==
By 2007, it had become a 200-bed multispecialty hospital. It includes 40 medical disciplines ranging from cardiology, cardiothoracic surgery, dental care, oncology and trauma to ENT.

In 2011, it acquired a 55 percent stake in the Vrundavan Hospital in Goa, which had 120 beds across two units. In 2012, Shalby acquired Krishna Hospital for an estimated Rs 75 crore, to become the biggest private corporate hospital in Ahmedabad. By 2012 the company had 450 beds in Ahmedabad.

In 2013, Shah claimed the hospital in Ahmedabad and completed an average of 30 joint replacement surgeries a day, at which point they had 705 employees.

During the period 1994–2009, the joint replacement team performed more than 20,000 TKR procedures. The length of surgical time in the hospital had been dramatically reduced from 1 hour and 20 mins per TKR to around 10 to 12 minutes using the "ZERO Technique" invented by Dr. Vikram Shah. Over the years, Shalby has performed over 1,00,000 Joint Replacement Surgeries.

In 2011, Shalby received the Diplomat in National Board (DNB) certificate in Orthopaedics. At the time, it was the only hospital in Gujarat to have this.
