= Murder of Umesh Kolhe =

Murder in Amravati, Maharashtra, India, June 2022

Murder of Umesh Kohle
- Location: Amravati, Maharashtra, India
- Date: 21 June 2022; 22:00 (IST)
- Attack type: Stabbing
- Weapon: Knife
- Deaths: 1
- Motive: Supporting Nupur Sharma's remarks (theorised)
- Accused: 7

The murder of Umesh Kolhe, a pharmacist from Amravati in the state of Maharashtra in India, was carried out by two men by stabbing on 21 June 2022.

== Murder ==
On June 21, 2022, pharmacist Umesh Prahladrao Kolhe was stabbed to death while returning home on his scooter after closing his pharmacy ‘Amit Medical Store’ near Ghantaghar in Shyam chowk area of Amravati, Maharashtra. Kolhe's son Sanket and his wife Vaishnavi were accompanying him on another scooter. Kolhe was taken to a nearby hospital but died while receiving medical treatment.

== Investigation ==
The police arrested seven men for Kolhe's murder all of whom are residents of Amravati. The police was able to locate the knife allegedly used to kill Kolhe.

Investigators are also investigating his social media post supporting BJP’s Nupur Sharma who had made controversial comments about Muhammad.

== See also ==
- Kamlesh Tiwari
- Murder of Samuel Paty
- Murder of Kanhaiya Lal
- 2022 Muhammad remarks controversy
- Islam and blasphemy
- Islam and violence
- List of Islamist terrorist attacks
