= 2022 Muhammad remarks controversy =

Controversy in India

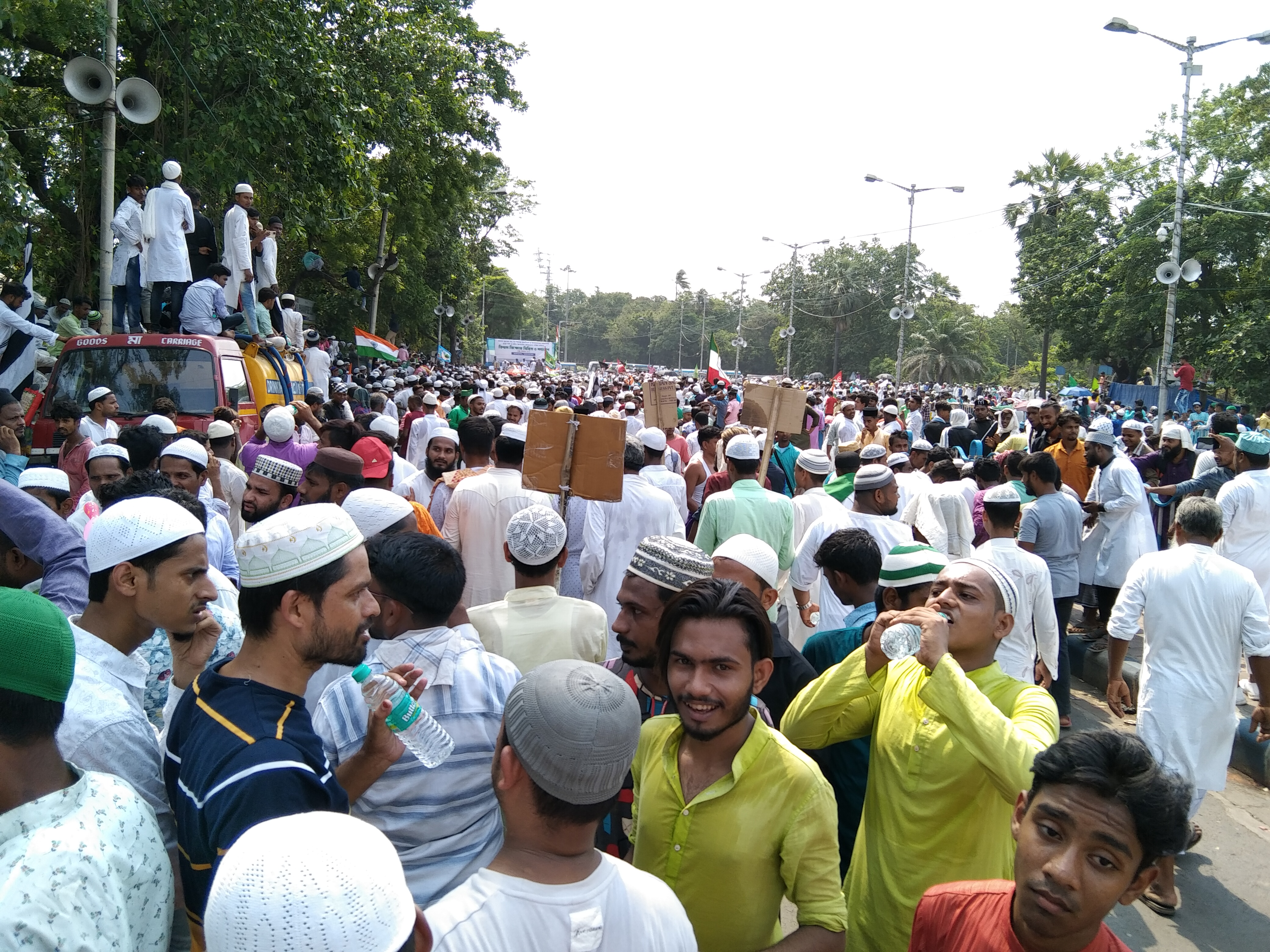
Protests against the remarks by the Muslim community of Kolkata, West Bengal

The 2022 Muhammad remarks row began on 27 May 2022, when Nupur Sharma, a spokeswoman of India's ruling party, Bharatiya Janata Party (BJP), made offensive remarks about the Islamic prophet Muhammad on a debate show, in reply to derogatory comments first made about the Hindu god Shiva by her on-panel Muslim adversary. Sharma's comment was in reference to an account from Sahih al-Bukhari that Muhammad (aged 53) married Aisha when she was six-years old, and the marriage was consummated when Aisha was nine. The controversy escalated on 1 June, when Naveen Kumar Jindal, the Delhi BJP media chief, made similar remarks on Twitter. By 4 June, the remarks had been widely shared on social media, and were trending among the top 10 hashtags in all the countries of the Gulf Cooperation Council (GCC) and Turkey. On the contrary, they were defended by far-right politicians in Europe, like Geert Wilders, who cited Sharma's right to freedom of speech.

The comments were strongly condemned by Muslim nations. Within India, dozens of police cases were filed against Sharma and Jindal. In some parts of the country, protests turned violent, leading to several deaths and injuries. The violence in Uttar Pradesh led to the punitive demolition of homes of some accused rioters.

Several Arab countries, including allies and partners of India, issued strong condemnations and there were threats of boycotting Indian goods. The Indian government responded to the controversy, by stating that the remarks did not reflect the government's views, but rather came from "fringe elements". The BJP suspended Sharma and expelled Jindal from the party.

== Background ==
The controversy emerged amid rising religious tensions in India. Some scholars have identified Hindutva, the ideological foundation of the ruling BJP, as a form of authoritarian populism that, according to critics, may contribute to the marginalization of minority communities. The BJP has been accused by some observers of using rhetoric that may contribute to communal tensions, particularly in relation to the country's Muslim population. Prime Minister Narendra Modi and BJP leaders have rejected these accusations, asserting that Hindu nationalism does not target or exclude any religious group, including India's large Muslim population.

In the lead-up to the controversy, communal tensions were further heightened by the Gyanvapi Mosque dispute. Historical sources suggest that the mosque was built during the reign of Mughal emperor Aurangzeb, and some accounts state that a pre-existing Shiva temple was demolished as part of its construction. Hindu groups maintain that a temple existed at the site before the mosque, whereas some Muslim representatives dispute this claim. However, the existence of an original Shiva temple is evident from the walls and temple complex which were never completely destroyed, instead, the mosque is built on the same pillars & foundation structure of the temple. The dispute has been widely covered in Indian media and has triggered contentious debates on television and social media platforms.

== Comments about Muhammad ==
Naveen Kumar Jindal 🇮🇳
(@NaveenJindalBJP)
tweeted:

Hindi:

नबी के दुलारो से पूछना चाहता हूँ कि तुम्हारा नबी 53 वर्ष की आयु में 6 वर्ष की छोटी बच्ची आयशा के साथ शादी करता है फिर 56 वर्ष की आयु में 9 वर्ष की आयशा के साथ संबंध बनाता है… क्या वह संबंध बलात्कार की श्रेणी में नहीं आता..?

Translation:

I would like to ask the admirers of the Prophet why your Prophet, at the age of 53, marries a young girl named Aisha who is only 6, and then at the age of 56, he consummates his marriage with Aisha, who is then 9... Doesn't that relationship fall into the category of rape...?

1 June 2022

On 27 May 2022, Sharma participated in a debate on the Gyanvapi Mosque dispute on the Times Now television channel. According to Sharma, in response to remarks (perceived to be derogatory to Hindu god Shiva) by her opposition speaker and by many Muslim personalities on social media, she replied regarding Muhammad and the age of one of his wives, Aisha, noting that Aisha was 6-years-old when married, and 9 when the marriage was consummated. However, she was merely quoting from the hadith.

A day later, the video clip of her comments were shared by Mohammed Zubair, the co-founder of Alt News, a fact-checking website, on social media. Sharma later alleged that it was a "heavily edited and selected video", which was denied by Pratik Sinha, the other co-founder of Alt News. Sinha stated that it was unedited and also included a longer clip which showed the context. Times Now deleted the video of the programme from its YouTube channel the next day. Nonetheless, Sharma defended her comments and accused Zubair of "heavily [editing]" the clip; she further claimed to have been receiving rape and death threats as a result, prompting Delhi Police to provide security cover. Alt News denied any responsibility for the reaction from the viewers after watching the video clip. BBC News refused to publish the remarks, citing their "offensive" nature.

Journalists note that Sharma has made similar comments on several TV shows. As of August 1, 2023, Alt News has not verified the Nupur Sharma's citation.

On 1 June, Naveen Kumar Jindal tweeted derogatory remarks about the Islamic prophet Muhammad. After the tweet attracted backlash in the Arab world, Jindal deleted the tweet and said he did not intend to demean any faith. Shoaib Daniyal from Scroll.in and Vir Sanghvi from Hindustan Times state that even though there is a history of intense sectarianism in Indian media debates, politicians at a senior level usually refrain from crossing the line of self-restraint and criticising gods, prophets, and religions in televised debates. Nupur Sharma's involvement in such criticism in a debate was unusual according to them.

== Police cases ==
A police first information report (FIR) was registered against Sharma, in Mumbai's Pydhonie Police Station, on the next day. She was accused of "hurting religious sentiments". A second FIR was registered in Thane (a suburb of Mumbai) on 30 May on the same grounds. Another FIR was registered by the AIMIM leader Asaduddin Owaisi, in Hyderabad, for using “abusive, false and hurtful” words against Muhammad and the Islam religion. Several other FIRs were registered at other locations in the country.

Sharma's comments were also widely shared, internationally, on social media. By 4 June, "insult to Prophet Mohammed" was trending among the top 10 hashtags in all the countries of Gulf Cooperation Council (GCC) and Turkey.

On 9 June, 2 weeks after the speech and the diplomatic event, Delhi Police registered cases against BJP spokesperson Nupur Sharma and Naveen Kumar Jindal, who served as the party's Delhi media cell head, who was expelled from BJP. The Delhi police have also filed a case against All India Majlis-e-Ittehadul Muslimeen (AIMIM) chief and MP, Asaduddin Owaisi, and Hindutva leader, Yati Narsinghanand, who is out on bail in the Haridwar hate speech case. Delhi Police has been accused of omnibus prosecution of many similar cases to make the original offence difficult to prosecute.

== Protests and violence ==
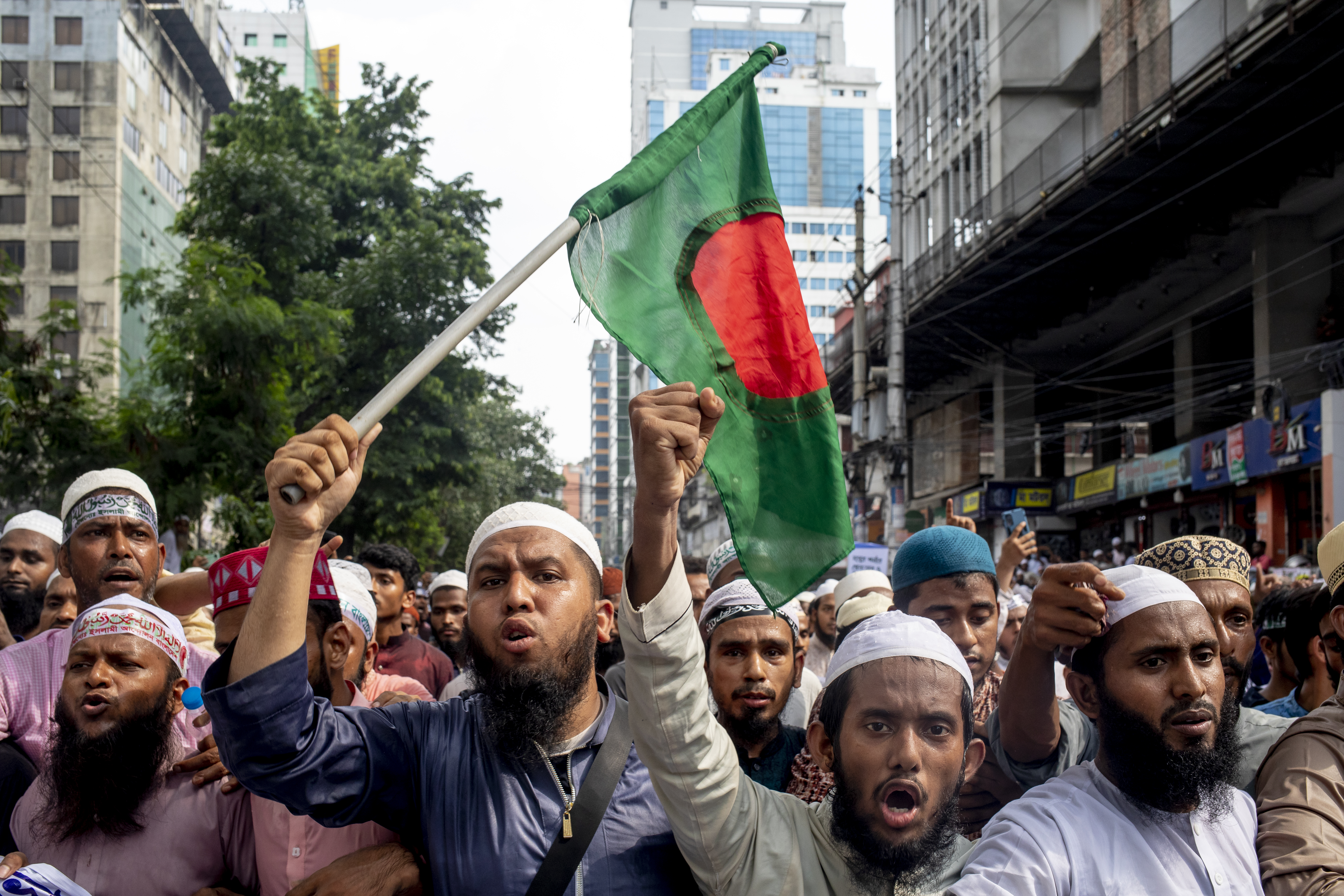
Protests in India's neighbouring nation of Bangladesh

Protests and violent incidents were reported from several Indian cities. In Uttar Pradesh, several people were injured in Kanpur and Prayagraj cities. According to the UP Police, a total of 136 people were arrested over the protests in the state.

=== Uttar Pradesh ===
On 3 June, hundreds of Muslims protested the remarks in Kanpur after Friday prayers.

Hayat Zafar Hashmi, chief of Maulana Mohammed Ali (MMA) Jauhar Fans Association called for a bandh (shutdown) of local shops in protest of comments from Sharma. They also planned to take out a procession. They forced the local shops to shut down at parade market after which the clash broke out between the business community and the protesters. Yogi Adityanath's government came down heavily on the protesters, lodging complaints and putting up posters against hundreds of protestors.

The clashes occurred at Nai Sadak, Yateemkana and Parade area of Kanpur. During the clashes, the groups threw bombs and stones on each other.

On 12 June, Reuters reported that the authorities in Uttar Pradesh had punitively demolished the homes of individuals accused of rioting in the state over the remarks. BBC reported as well.

=== Jharkhand ===
On 10 June, protests and human chain were organised in Ranchi against the controversial comments. According to the police the situation had escalated when a vehicle rammed into the group of protestors. Incidents of stone pelting was reported near the Hanuman temple, after which the Police attempted to disperse the crowds and used lathis, later on the police opened gunfire with live rounds. Two people died and more than 24 were injured. Both the dead had gunshot wounds on the head and neck.

The family of a victim, 15-year-old Mudassir Alam, said that he was shot in the head while standing on the street near the Hindu Shree Sankat Mochan Hanuman Temple. Three men had been firing gun shots and pelting stones at the protesters from the rooftop of the temple. Ranchi Deputy Commissioner said that the police fired after the mob turned violent and that the firing began from the mob. He did not clarify which mob he referred to and said the investigation is ongoing. CNN reviewed the video from the incident which showed the police firing indiscriminately on the unarmed protestors. A video from inside the temple showed the protestors throwing stones at the temple.

On 11 June, some Hindutva groups in Ranchi called for shutdown of shops in the city.

=== West Bengal ===
On 10 June, in different parts of Howrah district, arson and violence in protest was reported after Friday Muslim prayers. Railway tracks and highways were blocked by the protestors, causing hours of interruption of traffic. The situation later came under control, after police managed to clear the blockade. Internet services were also suspended in the district.

=== Maharashtra ===
On 13 June, Saad Ansari, a Muslim youth was assaulted by a Muslim mob in Bhiwandi, Thane over a social media post allegedly supporting Nupur Sharma. In his Instagram, Ansari had written, "A 50-year-old man marrying a 6-9-year-old girl is clearly child abuse. People do not know how to support him. Would you give your 6-year-old daughter to a 50-year-old man (think about it.)". Ansari was later arrested by the police for his post.

On the night of 21 June 2022, Umesh Kolhe, a chemist in Amravati, was murdered while returning from his shop riding a scooter. He was assaulted with a sharp weapon by three bike-borne attackers, who slit his throat in the presence of his son and daughter-in-law. Five people have been arrested in connection with the murder. According to the police, the accused had committed the murder since Kolhe shared posts on WhatsApp groups, supporting Nupur Sharma.

=== Udaipur ===
In Udaipur, Rajasthan a tailor Kanhaiya Lal posted remarks on social media in support of Nupur Sharma. Police complaint was filed against him and he was arrested. Police-mediated sessions were held between Lal and the complainants after which Lal gave a written assurance that he did not require further assistance from the police. Later he received death threats and informed the police.

On 28 June, Lal was killed by two Muslim men who subsequently shared a video of them carrying out the murder. In a second video uploaded by them the two men admitted the murder and showed the cleavers they had used. In the video, they also threatened to kill Prime Minister Narendra Modi. Both the accused tried to abscond the city on a motorbike but were arrested by the police within hours on the same day. Later five more men were detained.

After the incident, curfew was imposed in some parts of the city and internet services to the state were suspended for a day. Large gathering of people were banned for a month. Additional police force was sent for maintenance of law and order. The Rajasthan government announced a compensation of ₹31 lakh (US$32,000) for the family of the deceased and government jobs for both his sons.

The assailants were identified as Mohammad Riyaz Attari and Ghouse Mohammad. It was reported that Attari may have been planning to infiltrate the BJP through its loyalists, after photos of Attari attending BJP functions surfaced. In a 2020 post on Facebook, Attari had been described by a local Bharatiya Janata Party and Rashtriya Swayamsevak Sangh leader as a "dedicated worker of the BJP". On 2 July 2022, the Indian National Congress, the largest opposition party in India, alleged that Attari was a BJP member, using the social media pictures.

=== Kabul ===
On 18 June, militants carried out a terrorist attack at a Sikh gurdwara in Kabul, the capital of Afghanistan. The assailants killed a Taliban security officer before they entered the gurdwara with grenades and firearms and killed a Sikh worshipper and injuring seven others. The Khorasan Province of the Islamic State claimed responsibility via the Amaq News Agency, asserting it had been done as "an act of revenge" for the BJP official's remarks.

== International reactions ==
Several countries and the Organisation of Islamic Cooperation, a body of 57 countries, officially condemned remarks made by BJP leaders. Qatar, Kuwait and Iran summoned India's envoy to register their protest and handed them protest notes while Pakistan issued a demarche to the Indian charge d'affaires. There have been calls for boycott of Indian products in many countries of the Middle East.

=== Qatar ===
The Prime Minister of Qatar discussed the issue in the Qatari Cabinet's regular meeting. In a statement outlining the meeting, Qatar stated that the Cabinet underscored Qatar's condemnation and denunciation of the remarks made by an official in India's ruling party against Muhammad, which "constitute a grave insult to Islam, a violation of its sanctities, and a provocation to the feelings of Muslims all over the world, and completely contradict the values of tolerance, coexistence and civilized behavior".

The Cabinet called the remarks irresponsible and expressed a categorical rejection. The cabinet called on everyone "to focus on bringing people together, strengthening the bonds of friendship and co-operation between countries, and respecting all religions, and to stay away from everything that would incite hatred, inflame feelings of hostility and sow discord among the peoples".

The Qatari Ministry of Foreign Affairs issued a statement, noting: "These insulting remarks would lead to incitement of religious hatred, and offend more than two billion Muslims around the world." The statement was published during Indian Vice President M. Venkaiah Naidu's visit to Doha to meet Qatari Prime Minister.

India's Ambassador to Qatar Deepak Mittal said the comments "do not, in any manner, reflect the views of the Government of India. These are the views of fringe elements." Mittal was summoned by Qatar's Ministry of Foreign Affairs, which said it was "expecting a public apology and immediate condemnation of these remarks from the government of India".

"Allowing such Islamophobic remarks to continue without punishment, constitutes a grave danger to the protection of human rights and may lead to further prejudice and marginalization, which will create a cycle of violence and hate," Qatar said.

Qatar has also asked for public apology from Indian government, after which Indian social media users started making calls to "boycott Qatar Airways" while trending #BoycottQatarAirways and #BycottQatarAirways on Twitter. The latter backfired because of the spelling mistake.

=== Other Arab states ===
On 6 June, Saudi Arabia condemned the controversial remarks and called for “respect for beliefs and religions.” In a statement, the Ministry of Foreign Affairs rejected "prejudice against the symbols of the Islamic religion” and against “all religious figures and symbols.” The ministry supported the BJP's suspension of the spokeswoman.

The UAE's foreign ministry condemned what it called "the blasphemous remarks made by India's ruling BJP's spokesperson that insulted Prophet Muhammad (PBUH)". UAE's decision to join other Muslim-majority countries in condemning the remarks was called "quite significant" by BBC News, given the strength of India's alliance with the UAE.

Kuwait demanded a "public apology for these hostile statements, the continuation of which would constitute a deterrent measure or punishment to increase extremism and hatred and undermine the elements of moderation". A Kuwaiti supermarket removed Indian made products in protest. The Indian embassy in Kuwait released a statement indicating that the Ambassador had met with the foreign office to share concerns "with regard to some offensive tweets by individuals in India".

Oman's foreign ministry officials meanwhile met the Indian ambassadors and lodged official protest against India, saying such statements do not serve "peaceful coexistence". Ahmed bin Hamad al-Khalili, the grand mufti of Oman stated that the "obscene" comments of the spokesperson amounted to a "war against every Muslim".

Jordan's foreign ministry condemned the remarks of Nupur Sharma by saying "Violations against Islamic and other religious figures, considering it as an act that feeds extremism and hatred". While supporting the decision of the BJP to suspend Nupur Sharma by saying "step in the right direction".

The Parliamentary Committee on Awqaf and Tribals of Iraq strongly condemned controversial remarks by BJP leaders and summoned the Indian ambassador. The committee said "These abuses, malicious and disgraceful acts will have serious repercussions and, if not contained, may lead to dire consequences that will have unimaginable consequences for the peaceful coexistence, as well as increase strife and tensions between peoples."

Libya's foreign ministry expressed concern over the "insulting statements" by the spokesperson of the ruling party of India.

=== Other countries ===
President Arif Alvi of Pakistan said "such comments were the reflection of a growing trend of Islamophobia in India, which is home to millions of Muslims." Pakistan also issued a démarche to the Indian Charge d' Affaires in Islamabad. A statement issued by the Ministry of Foreign Affairs indicated that the chargé d'affaires was told that "these remarks are totally unacceptable and have not only deeply hurt the sentiments of the people of Pakistan but Muslims across the world".

Chinese Foreign Ministry spokesperson Wang Wenbin said: "We hope the relevant incident can be properly managed. China believes that different civilisations and different religions should respect each other and co-exist on an equal footing."

US State Department spokesman Ned Price said "We condemn the offensive comments made by now-suspended BJP officials and we were glad to see that the party publicly condemns those comments" He also said "We regularly engage with the Indian government at senior levels on human rights concerns including freedom of religion or belief and we encourage India to promote respect for human rights."

The interim Taliban government in Afghanistan strongly condemned the remarks by the BJP officials. The government's spokesperson, Zabihullah Mujahid, wrote on his Twitter handle, "The Islamic Emirate of Afghanistan strongly condemns the use of derogatory words against the Prophet of Islam (Peace be upon him) by an official of the ruling party in India." He also said, "We urge the Indian government not to allow such fanatics to insult the holy religion of Islam and provoke the feelings of Muslims."

The Indonesian Foreign Ministry condemned what it called "unacceptable derogatory remarks" regarding Muhammad.

A member of the Maldives' parliament, Adam Shareef filed for a motion that called on the country's president to condemn the remarks about Muhammad. The motion was defeated with 10 votes in favour and 33 votes against. Later, the Maldives' government expressed "concern" over the remarks, but also welcomed BJP's action taken against the officials.

The Malaysian foreign ministry condemned the remarks by the BJP spokesperson and summoned the Indian high commissioner. Welcomed the decision of the BJP to suspend the officials.

=== Organisation of Islamic Cooperation ===
The General Secretariat of the Organisation of Islamic Cooperation, a body of 57 countries had condemned the "abuse of the Prophet Muhammad" by the officials of India's ruling party. In an official statement it expressed "strong condemnation and denunciation of the recent insults issued by an official in the ruling party". "These abuses come in the context of the escalation of hatred and abuse of Islam in India and in the context of the systematic practices against Muslims and restrictions on them, especially in light of a series of decisions banning headscarves in educational institutions in a number of Indian states and demolitions of Muslim property, in addition to the increase in violence against them."

== Indian government response ==
The Indian government responded to international controversy, by stating that the controversial remarks did not reflect government position, but rather came from "fringe elements". The BJP removed both Sharma and Jindal, and said "strong action has already been taken against those who made the derogatory remarks". Instructions were issued to several BJP members to be "extremely cautious" when talking about religion on public platforms.

On 6 June, the Ministry of External Affairs (MEA) called out the Organisation of Islamic Cooperation (OIC)’s “motivated, misleading, and mischievous” comments on India. Arindam Bagchi, the Official Spokesperson of the Ministry of External Affairs, said India "categorically rejects OIC Secretariat's unwarranted and narrow-minded comments. The government of India accords the highest respect to all religions. The offensive tweets and comments denigrating a religious personality were made by certain individuals. They do not, in any manner, reflect the views of the Government of India. Strong action has already been taken against these individuals by relevant bodies.” Bagchi also responded to Pakistan's criticism by saying the world "has been witness to the systemic persecution of minorities including Hindus, Sikhs, Christians and Ahmadiyyas by Pakistan”, calling on the country to "focus on the safety, security and well-being of its minority communities instead of engaging in alarmist propaganda and attempting to foment communal disharmony in India”.

== BJP response ==
The incident caused a diplomatic row, with protests from several Muslim countries, on 5 June. The BJP responded, by releasing a statement that it respects all religions. The controversy continued to intensify. On June 5, Nupur Sharma published an apology on Twitter, but was suspended from the BJP, while Naveen Kumar Jindal was expelled from the party. Some supporters of BJP reacted to these actions with anger, calling them "cowardly".

On 7 June, Police security was provided to Sharma and her family, after she complained about receiving death threats and harassment. On 17 June, a police team of Mumbai Police that had come to Delhi to question Sharma, was unable to find her despite camping for 5 days.

Delhi BJP Media cell chief Navin Jindal was expelled from the party for his tweets. In the letter announcing the expulsion of Jindal, the Delhi State BJP chief said Jindal's "remarks vitiated communal harmony".

On 11 June, the BJP president JP Nadda met diplomats from Middle East nations, at the BJP headquarters, in Delhi.

All the BJP spokespersons were asked by the party to not make comments in public, on the controversy over Nupur's comments.

== See also ==
- Charlie Hebdo issue No. 1011
- Murder of Samuel Paty
- Kamlesh Tiwari
