= Geert Wilders =

Dutch politician (born 1963)

- Wilders in 2026

Second Deputy Speaker of the House of Representatives
- Incumbent
- Assumed office 20 November 2025
- Preceded by: Thom van Campen

Leader of the Party for Freedom Founder of the Party for Freedom
- Incumbent
- Assumed office 22 February 2006
- Preceded by: Position established

Leader of the Party for Freedom in the House of Representatives
- Incumbent
- Assumed office 23 November 2006
- Preceded by: Position established

Member of the House of Representatives
- Incumbent
- Assumed office 26 July 2002
- In office 25 August 1998 – 23 May 2002

Personal details
- Born: 6 September 1963 (age 63) Venlo, Netherlands
- Party: PVV (2006–present)
- Other political affiliations: VVD (1989‍–‍2004); Independent (2004‍–‍2006)
- Spouse: Krisztina Márfai (m. 1992)
- Website: geertwilders.nl

Geert Wilders (Note: English: /hɛərt ˈwɪldərz/ hairt WIL-dərz, Dutch: [ɣeːrt ˈʋɪldərs].) (born 6 September 1963) is a Dutch politician who has led the far-right Party for Freedom (PVV) since he founded it in 2006. He is also the party's leader in the House of Representatives. Wilders is best known for his right-wing populism, anti-immigration, opposition to Islam, and Euroscepticism. His views have made him a controversial figure in the Netherlands and abroad. Since 2004, he has been protected at all times by armed police.

After his education, Wilders travelled to Israel and other countries within the Middle East, working for insurance councils. In 1990, Wilders became a staff member of the conservative-liberal People's Party for Freedom and Democracy (VVD). He was elected to the municipal council of Utrecht in 1997. The following year he was elected to the House of Representatives. Citing irreconcilable differences over the party's position on the accession of Turkey to the European Union, he left the VVD in 2004 to form his own party, the Party for Freedom. His party provided confidence and supply to the first Rutte cabinet (2010–2012) and was the largest party in the Schoof cabinet (2024–2025).

Wilders has campaigned to stop what he views as the "Islamisation of the Netherlands". He has compared the Quran to Mein Kampf and has campaigned to have the book banned in the Netherlands. He advocates ending immigration from Muslim countries, and banning the construction of new mosques. His controversial 2008 short film featuring his views on Islam, Fitna, received international attention and criticism. On 4 September 2020, a Dutch court convicted Wilders for group insults, following comments he made about Moroccans in the Netherlands.

== Early life and career ==
Wilders was born on 6 September 1963 in the city of Venlo, in the province of Limburg. He is the son of Johannes Henricus Andreas Wilders and Anne Maria (Ording) Wilders. He is the youngest of four children and was raised Catholic. His father was Dutch; his mother Maria Anne Ourding was born in Sukabumi, the Dutch East Indies (now Indonesia) with a mixed Dutch and Indonesian background. His father worked as a manager for the printing and copying manufacturing company Océ. Wilders received his secondary education at the Mavo and Havo in Venlo.

Wilders' goal after he graduated from secondary school was to see the world. Because he did not have enough money to travel to Australia, his preferred destination, he went to Israel instead and volunteered for a year in a moshav, Tomer, on the West Bank. With the money he saved, he travelled to the neighbouring Arab countries, and was moved by the lack of democracy in the region. When he returned to the Netherlands, he retained Israeli ideas about counter-terrorism and a "special feeling of solidarity" for the country.

From September 1983, he fulfilled his military service. After training in Bergen op Zoom, he was stationed at the Oranjekazerne in Schaarsbergen until December 1984. In 1985 he moved to the Kanaleneiland district of Utrecht.

In 1984, he began working at the Health Care Insurance Board (Dutch: Ziekenfondsraad), for which he completed a training program at the in Amsterdam. Two years later, he became a legal adviser at the Social Security Supervisory Board. During this period, he obtained several partial certificates in law from the Open University of the Netherlands.

== Political career ==
Wilders became a member of the right-liberal People's Party for Freedom and Democracy (VVD) in 1989. A year later, he was hired as a staff member for the VVD's House of Representatives parliamentary group. As an assistant to Robin Linschoten, he focused primarily on the social security system from 1990 to 1994. In 1995, he was asked to co-author a report on Hungary with Perry Pierik and László Marácz, in which they strongly criticized the treatment of Hungarian minorities in neighboring countries. The report was leaked to de Volkskrant, which interpreted it as reflecting Greater Hungarian ideology and linked it to Wilders' Hungarian partner.

The Hungary report marked the beginning of his role in foreign policy, particularly regarding Eastern Europe and the Middle East. This new portfolio brought him closer to party leader Frits Bolkestein. Bolkestein was one of the first Dutch politician to address the consequences of mass immigration for Dutch society, including a sharp criticism of Muslim immigrants. He set an example for Wilders not only in his ideas but also in his confrontational speaking style.

In 1997, Wilders was elected for the VVD to the municipal council of Utrecht, the fourth largest city of the Netherlands.

=== VVD MP (2001-2004) ===
In the run-up to the 1998 general election, Wilders moved back to his hometown of Venlo. He expected to have a better chance of securing a high position on the party list through the more right-leaning VVD branch in Limburg. His candidacy was supported by Jos van Rey, and Mark Verheijen served as his campaign manager. He was assigned the 45th place on the list, which was sufficient to enter parliament following the 1998 cabinet formation. As a member of parliament, Wilders was again responsible for the social security portfolio, as well as Iraq, Iran, and Central Europe. On 28 October 1998, he delivered his maiden speech on restricting social benefits abroad. In 1999, he gained public attention for his proposal to limit benefit rights for individuals receiving Disability Insurance Act benefits due to psychological complaints.

Wilders also began focusing on Islamic fundamentalism, submitting dozens of parliamentary questions. In September 1999, he described Muslim extremism as "one of the greatest threats." He argued that terrorist groups were being financially supported from Saudi Arabia and called for international cooperation to combat this issue. This stance put him at odds with the Minister of Foreign Affairs, Jozias van Aartsen (VVD). Wilders requested an analysis of Muslim extremism, which was published in December 2001. Despite his involvement, he criticized the report as disappointing.

Wilders' knowledge of Muslim extremism brought him to prominence after the September 11 attacks in 2001. Compared to later statements, his views at that time were relatively moderate. He criticized Pim Fortuyn, who was at that time lead candidate for Livable Netherlands and called for a 'cold war on Islam'. Wilders stated two weeks after the attack in an episode of Barend en Van Dorp: "There is nothing wrong with Islam, it is a respectable religion. Most Muslims in the world, and in the Netherlands, are good citizens that have done nothing wrong. The problem lies with a handful of Muslim extremists." In 2010, Wilders said about this that he was "still burdened by the yoke of Van Aartsen and Dijkstal" at the time. Dijkstal, however, denied that Wilders had been restricted in his freedom of expression by the VVD.

In September 2004, Wilders left the VVD, to form his own political party, Groep Wilders, later renamed the Party for Freedom. The crunch issue with the VVD party line was about his refusal to endorse the party's position that European Union accession negotiations must be started with Turkey.

=== Party for Freedom ===
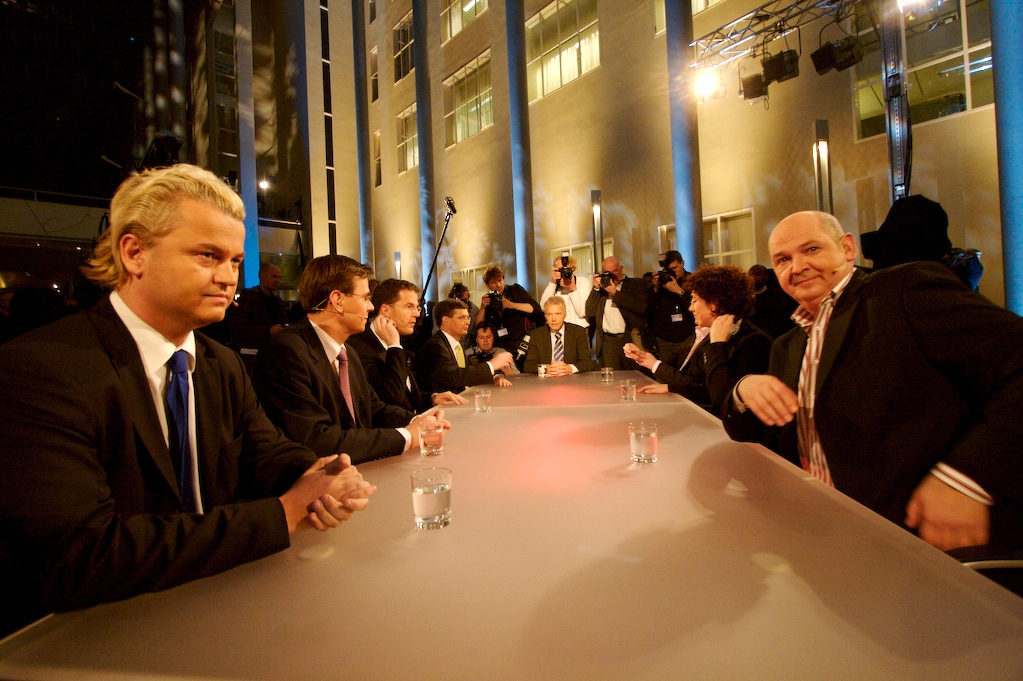
Wilders (left) during the final debate of the 2006 election

The Party for Freedom's political platform often overlaps those of the assassinated Rotterdam politician Pim Fortuyn and his Pim Fortuyn List. After his death, Fortuyn's impact remained, as more and more politicians sought to gain political mileage by directly confronting topics such as a ban on immigration that were, from a politically correct point of view, considered unmentionable in the Netherlands until Fortuyn came on the scene and upended the Dutch tradition of consensus politics with an anti-immigration stance. Wilders would position himself to inherit Fortuyn's constituency. The Party for Freedom called for a €16 billion tax reduction, a far stricter policy toward recreational drug use, investing more in roads and other infrastructure, building nuclear power plants and including animal rights in the Dutch constitution. In the 2006 Dutch parliamentary election, their first parliamentary election, the PVV won 9 out of the 150 seats.

Polling conducted throughout March 2009 by Maurice de Hond indicated the Party for Freedom was the most popular parliamentary party. The polls predicted that the party would take 21% of the national vote, winning 32 out of 150 seats in the Dutch parliament. If the polling results were replicated in an election, Wilders would be a major power broker. Under such circumstances, there would also be some likelihood of him becoming Prime Minister of the Netherlands. This has been partially attributed to timely prosecution attempts against him for hate speech and the travel ban imposed on him by the United Kingdom, as well as dissatisfaction with the fourt Balkenende cabinet's response to the 2008 financial crisis.

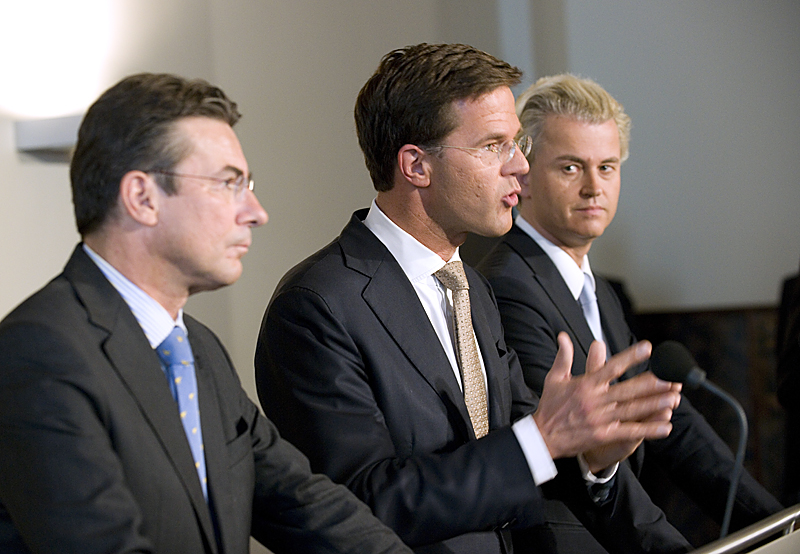
From left to right: CDA leader Maxime Verhagen, VVD leader Mark Rutte, and Wilders following the 2010 election

The PVV only contested the March 2010 municipal elections in The Hague and Almere, because of a shortage of good candidates. The big gains that were scored indicated that the party and Wilders might dominate the political scene in the run-up to the parliamentary elections scheduled on 9 June 2010. The PVV won in Almere and came second to the Dutch Labour party in The Hague. In Almere, the PVV won 22 percent of the vote to Labour's 18 percent. In The Hague, the PVV had 8 seats – second to Labour with 10 seats.

On 8 March 2010, Wilders announced that he would take a seat on the Hague city council, after it became clear he won 13,000 preference votes. Earlier he had said he would not take up a seat if he won.

In the parliamentary elections on 9 June 2010, the PVV increased its number of seats from 9 to 24 (out of 150), getting 15.5% of the vote. This made the PVV the third party in size. With a fragmented parliament, at least three parties were required for an absolute majority. A coalition of VVD and Christian Democratic Appeal (CDA) was negotiated with parliamentary support by the PVV. The PVV did not become part of the government formed by VVD and CDA but actively participated in the negotiations and thus policy decisions and – as part of the outcome agreed that they would not support any motion to dismiss ministers concerning topics listed in a so-called "support agreement" – much like the Danish model where the Danish People's Party had played a similar role.

On 21 April 2012, Wilders withdrew his support from the Rutte cabinet because of new austerity measures that were about to be taken. Commenting on his withdrawal Wilders blamed the "European dictates" pointing to the 3% rule on budget deficit for European countries although his party had supported these rules earlier on. The cabinet blamed Wilders for what they call his "lack of political will" and "political cowardice" in regards to addressing the economic woes of the Netherlands. Wilders' withdrawal from the negotiations led to new elections in September. Wilders and the PVV ran on a campaign to have the Netherlands withdraw from the European Union and for a return to the guilder. The PVV won 10.1% of the vote and 15 seats in parliament, a loss of 9 seats.

In the March 2014 municipal elections, Wilders' PVV only took part in two elections, The Hague and Almere, and suffered minor losses in both. At the election night party rally, he led his supporters in a provocative chant (calling for "fewer, fewer ... Moroccans"). This eventually led to a new trial against him (see § Trials).

In the May 2014 elections for the European Parliament, the Party for Freedom received 17.0% of the vote and four seats, a slight gain compared to the 13.3% of the vote the party had received in the previous parliamentary elections. In the run-up to and aftermath of those European elections, Wilders worked with the French Front National's Marine Le Pen to try to form a new parliamentary group in the European Parliament. They first announced their collaboration during a joint press conference in November 2013, where Wilders vowed that "today is the beginning of the liberation from the European elite, the monster in Brussels". Wilders visited the Sweden Democrats party and spoke with the Austrian Freedom party's leader Heinz-Christian Strache to help bring about the alliance, even while rejecting Hungary's Jobbik and Germany's NPD because he wanted to exclude "right-wing extremist and racist" parties. Three days after the elections finished, Le Pen and Wilders presented another press conference, this time with Matteo Salvini of Italy's Northern League, Harald Vilimsky of Austria's Freedom Party and Gerolf Annemans of Belgium's Flemish Interest party, to promise that the parliamentary group would be formed. Eventually, however, the effort failed because it could only unite parties from six EU member states, one fewer than is required by parliamentary rules. This was in part due to a refusal to include the Greek Golden Dawn or Poland's Congress of the New Right, and in part because parties like the Danish People's party and the True Finns refused to join.

In the March 2015 provincial elections, the Party for Freedom received 11.7% of the vote nationally, slipping slightly from the 12.4% of the vote it had gotten in the 2011 provincial elections.

The PVV contested the 2017 general election with Wilders at its helm. Although the PVV led other parties in opinion polls most of the time, all major parties ruled out forming coalitions with the PVV, effectively locking it out from any chance of taking part in, let alone leading, the next government. This raised the prospect of the PVV being locked out of power even if it won the most seats. Wilders hinted that a "revolution" would occur if his party won the most seats and was still shut out of government.

The PVV ended up achieving second place after winning 20 seats, five more than in 2012.

In the 2021 Dutch general election the PVV received 10.79% of the total votes cast. This earned them 17 seats in the House of Representatives. Responding to reporters who asked what his reaction was to the election results, Wilders attributed the loss of three seats to a recent lack of important events involving Islam and immigration.

In January 2021, it was revealed by OpenSecrets that American Robert J. Shillman paid nearly $214,000 in 2017 to help Wilders pay for his successful legal defence in an indictment for hate speech against Muslims in general and Moroccans in particular. Wilders has included the points of views of this financier in his election manifesto.

=== Schoof cabinet ===
In the run-up to the general election on 22 November 2023, migration was the dominant theme. During the campaign, the People's Party for Freedom and Democracy (VVD) did not rule out the possibility of forming a coalition with the Wilders' party, the PVV. Wilders positioned the PVV, previously perceived by a significant portion of the population as a right-wing radical party, as a centrist party with a clear stance on migration. In the week preceding the election day, Wilders took a more moderate tone and expressed willingness to set aside incompatible PVV themes.

In the election, the PVV won a quarter of the seats and became the largest party in the House of Representatives. The results of the election were described as "one of the biggest political upsets in Dutch politics since World War II".

During subsequent cabinet formation talks, Wilders announced that he was withdrawing his bid to become prime minister, citing a lack of support from potential coalition partners. The next day, he described his withdrawal as unfair and "constitutionally wrong". The Party for Freedom (PVV) entered a coalition government with the People's Party for Freedom and Democracy (VVD), New Social Contract (NSC), and the Farmer–Citizen Movement (BBB). Dick Schoof was selected to serve as prime minister, and his cabinet was sworn in on 2 July 2024. Wilders had initially proposed Ronald Plasterk for the position, but he withdrew over integrity concerns. The coalition parties called their migration policy the most stringent and extensive in history, and the agreement included plans to declare an asylum crisis, bypassing initial parliamentary approval. As questions surrounding the plan's legal viability prompted NSC to become critical, Wilders stressed that the cabinet would be in trouble if no emergency law was enacted. Schoof facilitated negotiations between the coalition parties, and an agreement on asylum measures was reached in October 2024, which excluded the use of emergency powers.

In December 2024, Wilders visited Israel, where he toured an Israeli settlement in the West Bank and met with President Isaac Herzog and Prime Minister Benjamin Netanyahu. The trip came weeks after the International Criminal Court (ICC) had issued an arrest warrant against Netanyahu and defence minister Yoav Gallant, which Wilders criticized, saying that "the world has gone mad". Dutch foreign affairs minister Caspar Veldkamp commented that meeting with leaders of illegal settlements would violate the coalition agreement.

== Political positions ==
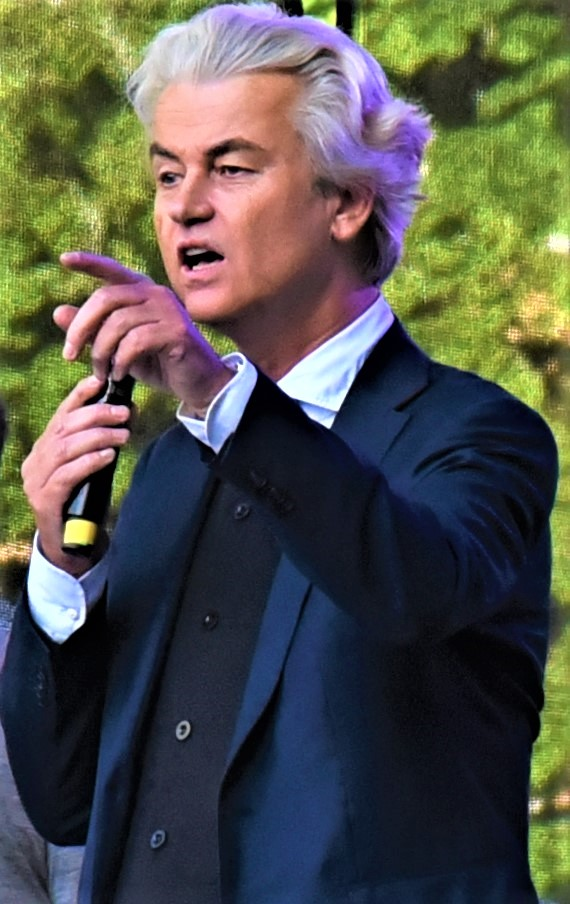
Wilders speaking in 2019

Wilders generally considers himself to be a right-wing liberal, with a specific mix of positions independent of the European political spectrum and peculiar to iconoclastic Dutch society. He has stated, "My allies are not Le Pen or Haider ... We'll never join up with the fascists and Mussolinis of Italy. I'm very afraid of being linked with the wrong rightist fascist groups", adding that his drive instead is such issues as freedom of expression and Dutch iconoclasm. Wilders views British prime minister Margaret Thatcher as his greatest political role model. People's Party for Freedom and Democracy figure Frits Bolkestein also heavily influenced his beliefs. On foreign relations, Wilders has largely supported Israel and has criticized countries he perceives as enemies of Israel.

=== Domestic principles ===
Wilders strongly opposes the Dutch political system in general. He believes that there is a ruling elite of parliamentarians who only care about their own personal careers and disregard the will of the people. He also blames the Dutch system of multiparty coalition governments for a lack of clear and effective policies. In his view, Dutch society advocates rule by consensus and cultural relativism, while he believes that this should change so as "not [to] tolerate the intolerant".

Wilders often mentions Henk and Ingrid in his speeches, fictitious ordinary Dutch subjects for whom he claims to work. Henk and Ingrid represent "the Average Joe" in Dutch political parlance, the "heart and backbone of Dutch society". They have been compared to Joe the Plumber in Dutch media (though he was a real person). According to Wilders, Henk and Ingrid live in a Vinex neighbourhood, have two school-attending children and a median income; both work outside the home. They used to vote for the Labour Party but now vote for the PVV.

Wilders has also revived the old idea of reuniting the Netherlands and Flanders in 2008.

=== Views on Islam ===
Wilders is best known for his criticism of Islam, summing up his views by saying, "I don't hate Muslims, I hate Islam". His brother Paul claimed in an interview that, in his private affairs, Wilders has no problems with Muslims. Although identifying Islamic extremists as 5–15% of Muslims, he argues that "there is no such thing as 'moderate Islam'" and that the "Koran also states that Muslims who believe in only part of the Koran are in fact apostates". He suggests that Muslims should "tear out half of the Koran if they wished to stay in the Netherlands" because it contains "terrible things" and that Muhammad would "... in these days be hunted down as a terrorist". Wilders argues that Islam is not a religion, but rather a totalitarian political ideology such as communism and fascism.

While best known for his anti-Islam views, Wilders had not yet developed these views as of 2001 when he spoke against Pim Fortuyn and said "I have said from the beginning: Islam, there is nothing wrong with that, it is a religion to be respected. Most Muslims in the world, but also in the Netherlands, are good citizens and there is nothing wrong with that. It's about that little bit of Muslim extremism.”

On 8 August 2007, Wilders opined in an open letter to the Dutch newspaper De Volkskrant that the Koran, which he called a "fascist book", should be outlawed in the Netherlands, like Adolf Hitler's Mein Kampf. He has stated that "The book incites hatred and killing and therefore has no place in our legal order". He has also referred to Muhammad as "the devil". In September 2009, Wilders proposed putting what he called a "head rag tax" on Hijab wearing by Muslim women; he suggested that women could purchase a license for €1000 and that the money raised could be used in projects beneficial to women's emancipation.

Some Muslim critics of Wilders accuse him of using Quranic verses out of context, and of manipulating verses to have a different meaning than the verses intended to. Wilders has stated that he supports the free speech rights of his critics, saying that "An Imam who wants a politician dead is – however reprehensible – allowed to say so". He has responded to critics' comments of racism and Islamophobia by stating, "I don't hate Muslims. I hate their book and their ideology".

He believes that all Muslim immigration to the Netherlands should be halted and all settled immigrants should be paid to leave. Referring to the increased population of Muslims in the Netherlands, he has said:

Take a walk down the street and see where this is going. You no longer feel like you are living in your own country. There is a battle going on and we have to defend ourselves. Before you know it there will be more mosques than churches!

In a speech before the Dutch Parliament, he stated:

Islam is the Trojan Horse in Europe. If we do not stop Islamification now, Eurabia and Netherabia will just be a matter of time. One century ago, there were approximately 50 Muslims in the Netherlands. Today, there are about 1 million Muslims in this country. Where will it end? We are heading for the end of European and Dutch civilisation as we know it. Where is our Prime Minister in all this?

Wilders has traveled widely in the Arab world and Der Spiegel has stated that Wilders will "wax poetic" over those "magnificent countries". Wilders has also said that "It's a real shame that these places are so chaotic."

After the November 2015 Paris attacks, Wilders, in an article in The New York Times, argued for a national referendum in the Netherlands to decide about the refugee crisis.

==== Fitna ====
Fitna is a 2008 short film written and commissioned by Wilders that explores Koranic-inspired motivations for terrorism, Islamic universalism, and Islam in the Netherlands. Its title comes from the Arabic word fitna, which means a "test of faith in times of trial", or refers to a situation where one's faith is tested.

It was the subject of an international controversy and debate on free speech, and drew condemnation from Arabs. Despite the legal troubles surrounding the film, Wilders insists that before he released it, he consulted numerous lawyers in the field, who found nothing worthy of prosecution. The kingdom of Jordan has summoned Wilders to court, with the film deemed to "incite hatred". Militant Sunni Islamist group Al-Qaeda issued a call to murder Wilders after its release.

=== Views on the European Union ===
Wilders is eurosceptic. In 2013, he along with Marine Le Pen teamed up in the European Parliament campaigning against the EU and the single currency, with Wilders calling the EU the "monster in Brussels". He added "We want to decide how we control our borders, our money, our economy, our currency." In a publicity stunt in 2014, Wilders vandalised the Flag of Europe with scissors in front of the Parliament in Brussels.

After the 2016 referendum in the United Kingdom, Wilders praised the result for the UK and said that the Netherlands should do the same; in a statement he said: "The Party for Freedom consequently demands a referendum on NExit, a Dutch EU exit". During Dutch general and European elections, Wilders has campaigned for the right for the Dutch public to vote in a Nexit referendum on EU membership and has included this point in PVV election manifestos since the 2012 Dutch general election. Following the 2023 Dutch general election in which the PVV emerged as the largest party, Wilders stated that while he was still opposed to the European Union, he had suspended his call for Nexit during coalition talks with other political parties and would instead use his position to roll back and dismantle the powers of the EU from the inside.

=== Views on Israel and Palestine ===
Wilders stated about Israel: "I have visited many interesting countries in the Middle East – from Syria to Egypt, from Tunisia to Turkey, from Cyprus to Iran – but nowhere did I have the special feeling of solidarity that I always get when I land at Ben Gurion International Airport." Dutch tv programme Netwerk reported that numerous American supporters of Israel financially supported Wilders' Party for Freedom and openly approved of his message towards Islam and Islamic terrorism. Wilders told an audience during the report that "We [in the West] are all Israel". He has also said "Israel is the West's first line of defence" against what he perceives to be a threat posed by Islam.

Following the 2010 Dutch general election, Wilders said Jordan should be renamed Palestine. The Jordanian government responded saying Wilders' speech was reminiscent of the Israeli right wing. His speech said "Jordan is Palestine. Changing its name to Palestine will end the conflict in the Middle East and provide the Palestinians with an alternate homeland." He also said Israel deserves a special status in the Dutch government because it was fighting for "Jerusalem" in its name.

"If Jerusalem falls into the hands of the Muslims, Athens and Rome will be next. Thus, Jerusalem is the main front protecting the West. It is not a conflict over territory but rather an ideological battle, between the mentality of the liberated West and the ideology of Islamic barbarism. There has been an independent Palestinian state since 1946, and it is the kingdom of Jordan."

In December 2010, Wilders urged Israel to build more Israeli settlements in the occupied West Bank and subsequently annex the West Bank so that Israel could establish defensible borders. He blamed Arab countries for the suffering of Palestinian refugees and called on Jordan to open its borders to Palestinians.

The Dutch Intelligence Service (AIVD) investigated Wilders in 2009–2010 for his "ties to Israel and their possible influence on his loyalty."

Wilders condemned the October 7 attacks. After the attacks, he displayed an Israeli flag in his office alongside the Dutch one. During an election debate in October 2023, he criticized the Dutch government for not taking action against pro-Palestinian and anti-Israel protests.

=== Views on Russia and Ukraine ===
In 2016, Wilders described Vladimir Putin as a "true patriot" and an ally in the war against Islamic terrorism. In 2016, he opposed the Association Agreement between the European Union and Ukraine.

In November 2017, Wilders said there was "hysterical Russophobia" in the Dutch government that he wanted to counter. However, the PVV insisted on punishing the perpetrators of the downing of flight MH17. On 28 February 2018, four years after Russia's annexation of Crimea, Wilders traveled to Moscow and met with senior Russian officials in the Duma. His trip sparked sharp criticism among relatives of Dutch victims of the MH17 disaster, who accused him of disregarding Moscow's involvement in the tragedy.

On 24 February 2022, the day the Russian invasion of Ukraine started, Wilders tweeted "Do not let Dutch households pay the price for a war that is not ours." Wilders and PVV backed an unsuccessful motion to declare Dutch neutrality in February 2022 and to end sanctions on Russia in June 2022. He linked sanctions against Russia with rising inflation and the energy crisis. In March 2022, Wilders tweeted, "I have sympathy for the Ukrainians, but I have been elected by the 1 million Dutch people who have voted for me." He would temporarily accept a limited number of Ukrainian refugees and support European states accepting refugees from Ukraine.

Later in 2022, Wilders and the PVV verbally condemned the Russian invasion, although in 2023, Wilders argued against military aid to Ukraine. According to the PVV's electoral manifesto, "The Russian aggressor has unlawfully invaded Ukraine. But we do not send our money and defence equipment such as F16s to Ukraine but keep it for our own Armed Forces".

Documents leaked by Ukrainian hackers in October 2023 purported to show attempts by the Kremlin to cultivate connections with members of PVV.

=== Views on LGBT community ===
According to Wilders, the LGBT community in Europe is threatened by mass immigration from the Muslim world. He said that "We were always one of the top parties that were supported by (the gay) community. We believe that like Christians and Jews and women and journalists, gay people are also one of the first to pay the price of ... Islamization." International commentators have documented that Wilders has typically promoted more moderate and socially liberal positions towards LGBT people when compared to other national-populist political leaders in Europe, which Wilders frames as being part of a Dutch traditional value of tolerance.

In 2017, Wilders and the PVV voted in favour of including mandatory LGBT education in secondary vocational education while other Dutch conservative parties voted against. However, Wilders has criticized the promotion of "woke indoctrination" among young children, describing it as a "woke dictatorship". Wilders said that the freedoms that homosexual people should ideally enjoy, such as the freedom to express affection, marry, and have children, are held back by Islam which opposes it, and actively resists against it.

In 2022, Wilders stated: “If people are transsexual, they get all the respect from the PVV. We have no problem with that" but argues transgender people should only be allowed to change gender with the approval of a doctor or psychiatrist.

=== Other positions ===
In the 1990s while at the VVD, Wilders advocated for ethnic Hungarians, claiming that Hungarians in Romania, Slovakia, Serbia and Ukraine were being oppressed. In 1996, the VVD distanced itself from the Hungary working group after questions were asked by Slovak diplomats.

Wilders supported Indian politician Nupur Sharma's comments on Muhammad that caused controversy. He also supported the decision of India's Hindu nationalist-led government to revoke the special status of Muslim-majority Jammu and Kashmir. He posted: "India is a full democracy. Pakistan is a 100 per cent terror state. So the choice is easy. Welcome home Kashmir. #IndiaForKashmir."

Regarding climate change, Wilders has said "We are not climate deniers. We have a climate problem, but we cannot solve it in the Netherlands. If you close a coal-fired power station in the Netherlands, ten will be added in China in the same week."

In 2022, when Prime Minister Mark Rutte expressed his apology on behalf of the government of Netherlands over excessive violence conducted by Dutch troops during the Indonesian National Revolution, Wilders criticized Rutte saying that the apology severely dishonored Dutch veterans. Wilders in turn demanded that the government of Indonesia should apologize instead over their excessive violence during the Bersiap period.

== Public reception ==
=== Image ===
Wilders has become a controversial figure with polarized opinions on him from the world news media. Regarding his reputation in the Netherlands, Wilders stated in 2009, "Half of Holland loves me and half of Holland hates me. There is no in-between." In 2005, the Dutch public expressed mixed reactions to Wilders' general agenda, with 53% calling it "implausible" and 47% who did not. He has been described as populist, labelled as both "extreme right" and far-right, and defended by others as a mainstream politician with legitimate concerns saying that such labels are shallow smear attempts. Wilders himself rejects the labels and has called such descriptions "scandalous". A 2023 profile by the BBC claimed Wilders to be a "firebrand and a radical" in public who fiercely rejects the "far-right" label but "affable" in private and that he gets on well with many of his political opponents. Journalist and filmmaker Stephen Robert Morse who produced the documentary EuroTrump detailing Wilders' campaign during the 2017 Dutch general election described Wilders as holding strong opinions but also as a "likable and normal guy" outside of politics.

Editorials in The Montreal Gazette, The Wall Street Journal, The Guardian, and The New York Times have accused Wilders of hypocrisy given that, in their view, Wilders has called for the ban of the sale of the Quran while simultaneously arguing for his own personal freedom of speech. In a speech during a Dutch parliamentary debate, Wilders elaborated that he calls for the consistent application of Dutch laws restricting any act of expression that incites violence. Ideally, he would prefer to see nearly all such laws abolished.

Wilders has been both accused of building his popularity on fear and resentment and vociferously defended for having the courage to talk openly about the problems unfettered immigration brings with it and the "incompatibility" of fundamentalist Islam with western values.

=== Domestic recognition ===
Wilders was respectively declared as "Man of the Year" on 22 December 2023 by Dutch magazine Panorama and "Politician of the Year" on 15 December 2007 by NOS-radio. The parliamentary press praised his ability to dominate political discussion and to attract the debate and to get into publicity with his well-timed one-liners. The editors eventually gave the title to Wilders because he was the only one who scored high among both the press and the general public. In December 2009, Wilders came in second in two polls in the Netherlands for Politician of the Year. A panel of Dutch television viewers praised him as "the second best" politician this year (after his outspoken critic Alexander Pechtold), while his colleagues in parliament named him "the second worst" (after Rita Verdonk).

In February 2010, the trailer of a newly published online satirical video on the website of the Dutch radio station FunX, which targets a young urban audience, spoofed a murder attempt on Wilders.

On 2 October 2011 Radio Netherlands Worldwide reported that retired Dutch politician Frits Bolkestein, who is sometime called the 'mentor' of Geert Wilders, "does not share his views". He reportedly said that "Wilders says things that are just not right and I think he totally exaggerates." While giving his opinion on burqa ban Bolkestein said that he "disagrees with the recent introduction of a burqa ban, an idea championed by Geert Wilders." The Netherlands, he said, is the third European country to introduce such a ban after France and Belgium. "A ban makes martyrs of the few burqa wearers there are in the Netherlands", he said.

Wilders has also been compared to the assassinated fellow critic of Islam and filmmaker Theo van Gogh, but he does not see himself as taking on Van Gogh's mantle.

In February 2012, Wilders was accused of anti-Polish sentiment after his party launched a "hotline" website for public complaints specifically about Poles and as well as Bulgarians, Romanians and other Eastern Europeans who are causing a "nuisance". The website prompted the Polish embassy in the Netherlands to request the website to be shut down while the Romanian embassy called it "discriminatory". Several politicians denounced the website, although prime minister Mark Rutte did not comment. Shortly after the website launch, a number of Poles in the Netherlands reported being targeted by vandalism or insulted for speaking Polish in public.

In May 2014, Dutch Foreign Minister Timmermans condemned Wilders' anti-Islam sticker, saying that "The Netherlands cannot be held responsible for the adolescent behavior of a single parliamentarian." Timmermans said that Saudi Arabia is "deeply offended by the sticker action."

=== Historical evaluation in the Netherlands ===
In the Netherlands, Wilders and his movement have been discussed in historical and psychological perspectives. Dutch philosopher Rob Riemen characterised Wilders and his movement in 2010 as "the prototype of contemporary fascism" after having defined fascism itself as "the politisation of the resentment of the man in the crowd", in line with previous definitions by Menno ter Braak, Albert Camus and Thomas Mann.

Historian Robin te Slaa of NIOD Institute for War, Holocaust and Genocide Studies disagreed and concluded in 2012 that Wilders is no fascist in the historical sense. Wilders and his party do not formally subscribe to classical fascist tenets such as biological racism, social darwinism, an autocratic state, rejection of democracy and of individualism, a cult of autocratic one-man leadership and a Third Way economic policy, in between capitalism and Marxism. Instead, Wilders is seen as a libertarian proponent of laissez-faire economic policy, personal autonomy, women's equality and the emancipation of homosexual people. However, Te Slaa noted the extreme right-wing populism, the proposed discrimination of Muslims, the Islamophobia and the rejection of the state based on the rule of law by Wilders. He cited Dutch prime minister Mark Rutte's characterisation of Wilders as a "political pyromaniac" because of the absence of practical solutions in Wilders' disputed Islamophobic proposals.

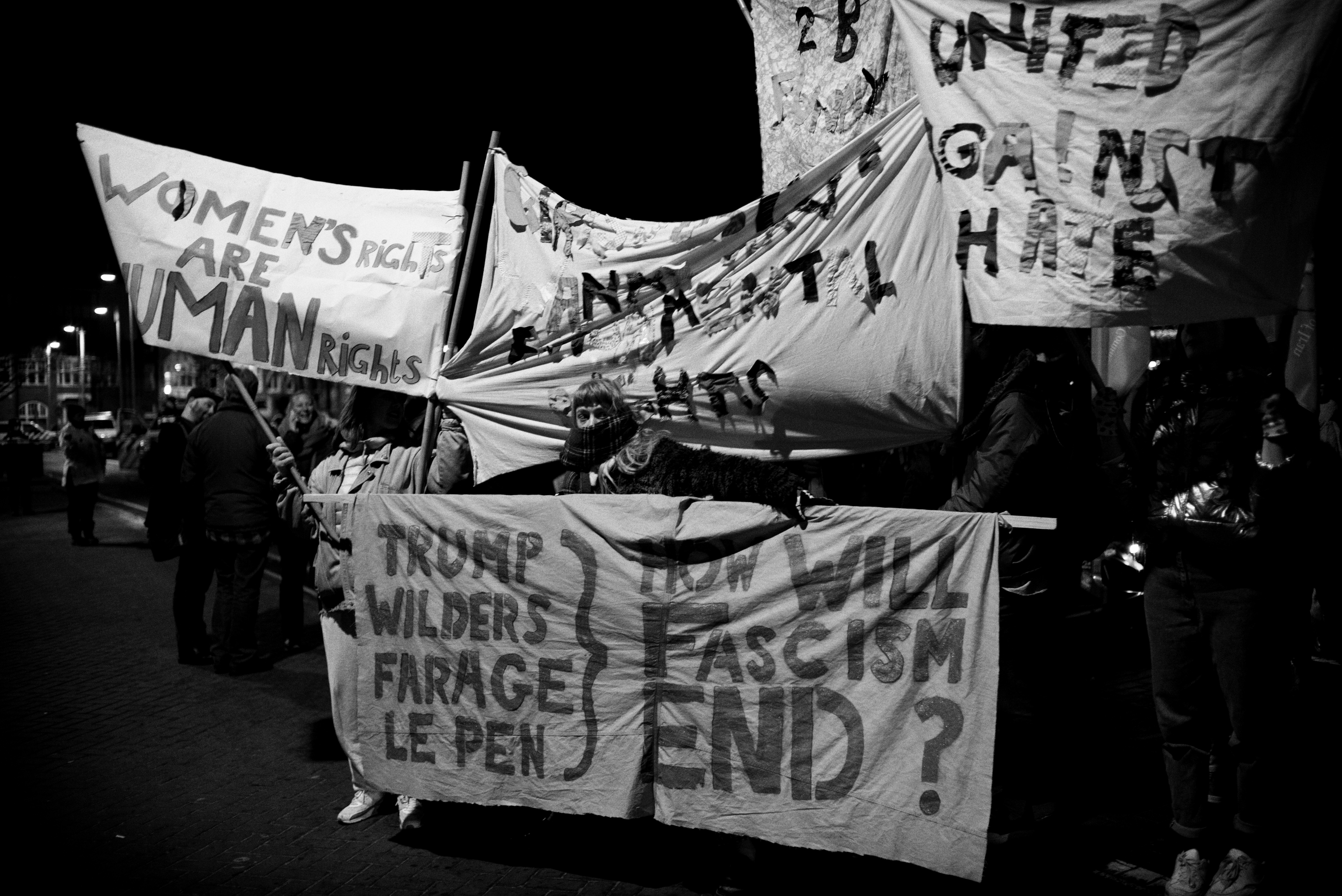
Wilders (alongside Donald Trump, Nigel Farage, Marine Le Pen) named as fascists during a 2017 march in Amsterdam

=== International ===
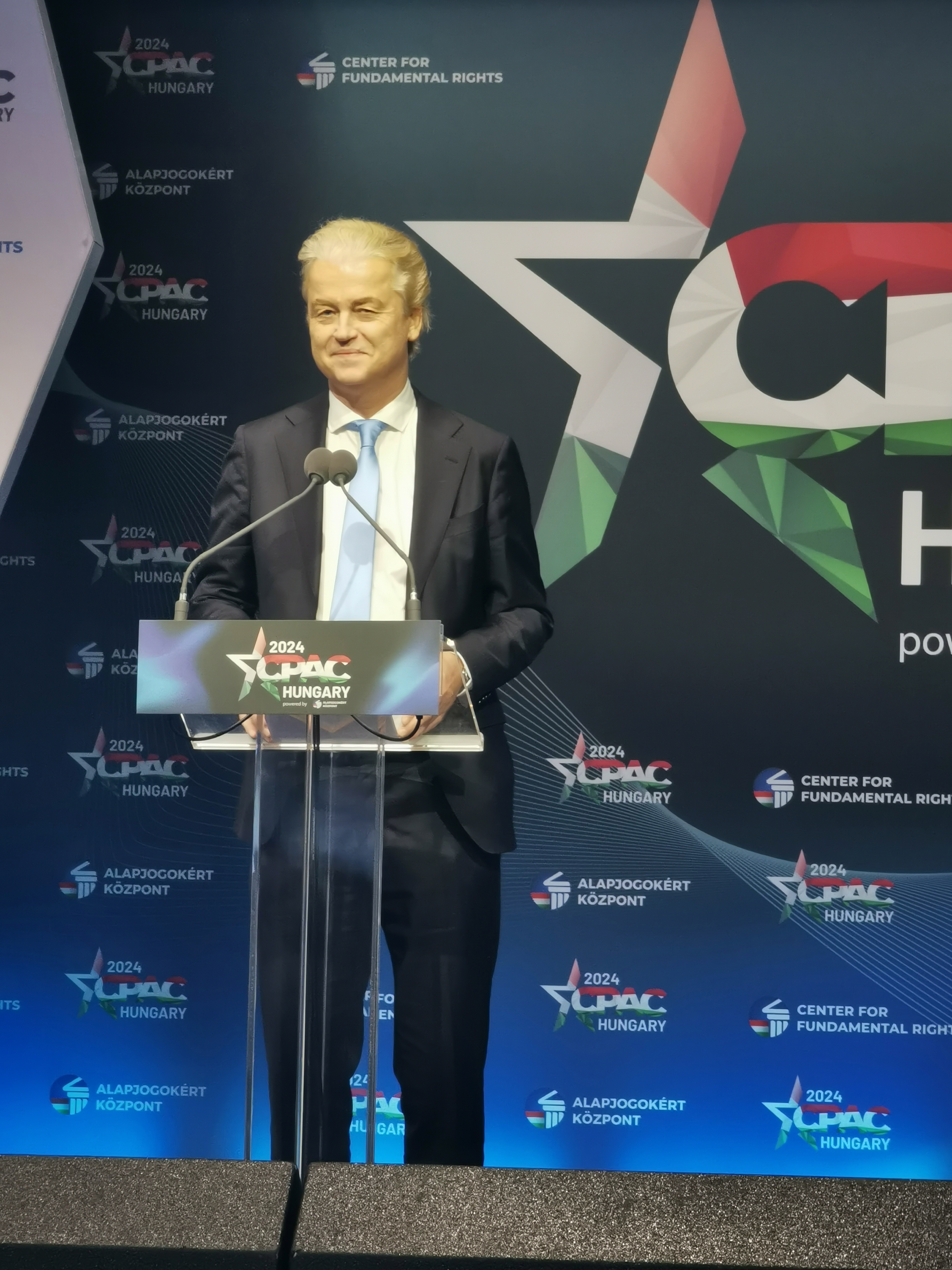
Speaking at CPAC Hungary 2024

Wilders was extensively discussed in leaked American diplomatic cables. In a briefing to president Barack Obama, he was described as "no friend of the US: he opposes Dutch military involvement in Afghanistan; he believes development assistance is money wasted; he opposes NATO missions outside 'allied' territory; he is against most EU initiatives; and, most troubling, he foments fear and hatred of immigrants."

In July 2011, Anders Behring Breivik, the man who carried out the 2011 Norway attacks, expressed admiration for Geert Wilders and the Party for Freedom. Wilders immediately distanced himself strongly from Breivik.

On 28 July 2015, Vienna's prosecutors' office launched a probe and lodged calls for criminal proceedings against Geert Wilders for allegedly comparing the Quran to Mein Kampf, after Tarafa Baghajati had accused him of hate speech and denigrating religious teachings.

In October 2020, Turkish President Recep Tayyip Erdoğan sued Wilders after he posted a series of tweets against Erdoğan and urged NATO to take Turkey out of the bloc. Dutch Prime Minister Mark Rutte said that a legal case "against a Dutch politician that could possibly even lead to a curtailment of freedom of expression is not acceptable."

Wilders election win 2023 drew praise from right-wing figures across Europe, including Marie Le Pen of France's National Rally and Santiago Abascal of Spain's Vox party.

== Personal life ==
Wilders was in a short-lived marriage at the age of 20. He has since been married to Krisztina Wilders (née Márfai), a former diplomat from Hungary of Jewish origin, since July 1992. Wilders is an agnostic.

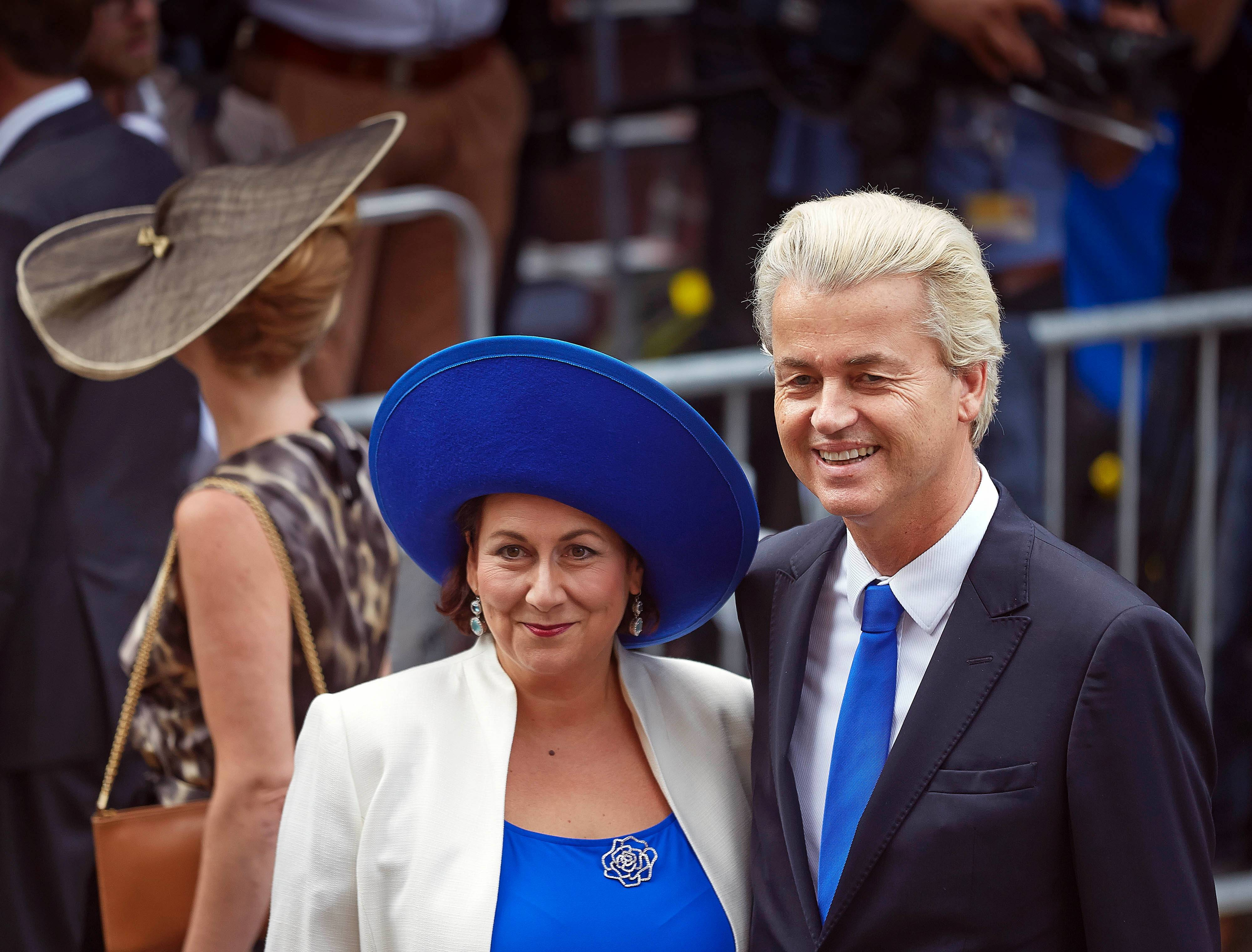
Krisztina and Geert Wilders on Prinsjesdag in 2014

In June 2011, disclosure of Wilders's personal finances indicated that he founded a self-administered company one year earlier without reporting this via the public records of the House of Representatives, which he, as a parliamentarian, should have done. The company is known as OnLiberty BV and is aimed at acquiring intellectual and property rights. Wilders later explained he had acted this way for security reasons and that the company had no connection to the PVV. OnLiberty BV has since been formally registered in Breda.

Wilders has been bleaching and dyeing his hair to peroxide-platinum blond since at least the mid-1990s. As a result of hair graying, Wilders' dark roots show less. Wilders has acquired nicknames such as "Mozart" and "Captain Peroxide" because of his flamboyant platinum blond hairstyle.

=== Protection ===
On 10 November 2004, two suspected attackers were captured after an hour-long siege of a building in The Hague. They were in possession of three grenades and were accused of planning to murder Wilders as well as a fellow MP, Ayaan Hirsi Ali. The suspects were presumed to be members of what the Dutch intelligence agency, the General Intelligence and Security Service, has termed the Hofstad Network (Hofstadgroep). Since this incident Wilders has been under constant security protection because of frequent threats to his life. In September 2007, a Dutch woman was sentenced to a one-year prison term for sending more than 100 threatening emails to Wilders. In 2009, a rapper from Rotterdam was sentenced to 80 hours community service and a two-month suspended jail term for threatening Wilders in a rap song.

Wilders was reported to have been "deprived... of a personal life for his... hatred of Islam". He is constantly accompanied by a permanent security detail of about six plainclothes police officers, and does not receive visitors unless they are cleared in advance, thoroughly searched, and escorted at all times. He lives in a state-provided safe house which is outfitted to be bulletproof, is heavily guarded by police, and has a panic room. He is driven from his home to his offices in parliament in an armored police vehicle, and wears a bulletproof vest. His office is located in the most isolated corner of the Dutch Parliament building, and was chosen because potential terrorists can get to it through only one corridor, making it easier for his bodyguards to repel an attack. The restrictions on his life, he said, are "a situation that I wouldn't wish on my worst enemy".

In January 2010, Karen Geurtsen, a Dutch journalist from the magazine HP-De Tijd, revealed a breach of security. She spent four months working undercover, posing as an intern, for the PVV party. She claimed that she had had unchecked access to Wilders. "I could have killed him", were the first words of the article that she published about this operation. According to her, she had "dozens" of opportunities to take his life. In July 2010, after Wilders complained that his security was inadequate, the Special Security Assignments Brigade, a special unit of Dutch military police, made four attempts to smuggle a firearm into the heavily guarded offices of Wilders' PVV, two of which were successful. Following these breaches, security at the offices was increased.

=== Death threats ===
Wilders is the most threatened politician in the Netherlands.

In September 2010, in an internet chat room, Australian Islamic fundamentalist preacher Feiz Mohammad urged his followers to behead Wilders. His rationale was his accusation that Wilders had "denigrat[ed]" Islam, and that anyone who "mocks, laughs or degrades Islam" as Wilders had must be killed "by chopping off his head." The Dutch newspaper De Telegraaf released an excerpt of the talk, after Dutch intelligence officials received a tip about the threat. After the 2013 Boston Marathon bombing, Wilders wrote:

I am threatened for the simple reason that I am an Islam critic. But, make no mistake, I am not the only one who is in danger. The Tsarnaev brothers drew inspiration from Feiz Mohammed's internet rants and decided to kill innocent onlookers at a marathon. Everyone is in danger.

In July 2010 Anwar al-Awlaki published a "death list" in his Inspire magazine, including Wilders, Ayaan Hirsi Ali and Salman Rushdie along with cartoonists Lars Vilks and three Jyllands-Posten staff members: Kurt Westergaard, Carsten Juste, and Flemming Rose.

Pakistani male Junaid I. was arrested in the Den Haag Centraal railway station after having posted a video with threats against Wilders on Facebook the previous day. He had been enraged about a Muhammad cartoon contest announced by Wilders. In 2019, Junaid I was sentenced to ten years in prison as an attack on a parliamentarian constitutes an attack on Dutch rule of law, the convict had shown an interest in violent extremism and the great risk of recurrence. In February 2021, the appeals court came to the same verdict and sentence.

Wilders said he had received hundreds of death threats after he supported Indian politician Nupur Sharma's comments on Muhammad that caused controversy. He remained defiant, stating that he stood for freedom. After the murder of a Hindu tailor by two Muslim men, he cautioned the people of India against 'appeasement of Islam'.

=== Trials ===
==== 2009 ====
Several groups and persons in the Netherlands have called for legal action against Wilders, while others, including Christian fundamentalists, defended his right to free speech. On 15 August 2007, a representative of the Prosecutors' Office in Amsterdam declared that dozens of reports against Wilders had been filed, and that they were all being considered. Attempts to prosecute Wilders under Dutch anti-hate speech laws in June 2008 failed, with the public prosecutor's office stating that Wilders' comments contributed to the debate on Islam in Dutch society and also had been made outside parliament. The office released a statement reading: "That comments are hurtful and offensive for a large number of Muslims does not mean that they are punishable. Freedom of expression fulfils an essential role in public debate in a democratic society. That means that offensive comments can be made in a political debate." On 21 January 2009, a three-judge court ordered prosecutors to try him.

In late October 2010, the Dutch court approved a request from Geert Wilders to have new judges appointed forcing the court to retry the case. On 7 February 2011, Wilders returned to the court room in order that his legal team could present evidence from Islamic experts which the court rejected in 2010, including Mohammed Bouyeri, who murdered film-maker Theo van Gogh, and Dutch academic Hans Jansen.

On 23 June 2011, Wilders was acquitted of all charges. A Dutch court said that his speech was legitimate political debate, but on the edge.

==== 2016 trial ====
On 18 March 2016, a second trial against Wilders began, this time on the accusation of inciting "discrimination and hatred" against Moroccans living in the Netherlands. On 17 November 2016, the Dutch Public Prosecution Service demanded a fine against him of €5,000 (£4,300). On 9 December 2016, he was convicted in a hate speech trial but no penalty was imposed. That verdict was overturned in 2020 when a higher court found that while Wilders's remarks were insulting to an ethnic minority, they were found to be in the service of receiving political gains rather than inspiring discrimination.

== International initiatives ==
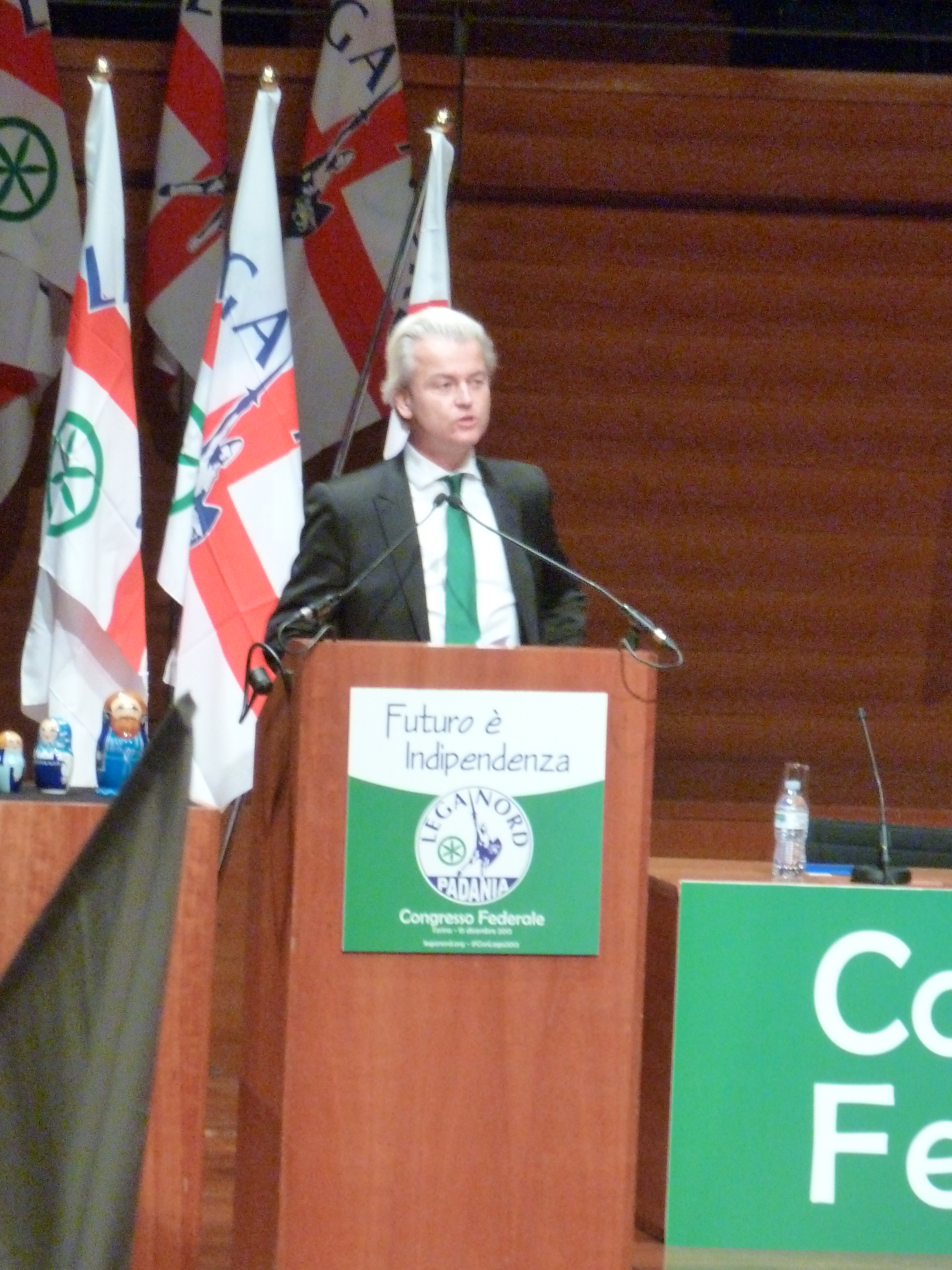
Wilders speaking at a Lega Nord congress in Italy

Wilders is regarded as part of the international counter-jihad movement and as "the most successful counter-jihadist politician in the world". He is described as the "main counter-jihad standard bearer across Europe ... feted by campaigning organisations in North America".

In the spring of 2009, Wilders launched the "Facing Jihad World Tour", a series of screenings of Fitna to public officials and influential organizations, starting in Rome. In the US, Wilders showed the film to the United States Congress in February, having been invited by Arizona Republican Senator Jon Kyl. Around 40 people attended the screening. American Muslims protested, but said they supported his right of free speech while still condemning his opinions. Wilders appeared before the National Press Club and the Republican Jewish Coalition as well. Similar attempts in Britain led to a travel ban.

In July 2010, Wilders announced the International Freedom Alliance, a network of groups and individuals who "are fighting for freedom against Islam". Wilders planned IFA branches in the United States, Canada, Britain, France and Germany by late 2010. "The message, 'stop Islam, defend freedom', is a message that's not only important for the Netherlands but for the whole free Western world", Wilders stated to reporters at the Dutch Parliament. Wilders stressed the group would not contain far-right extremists.

=== United States ===
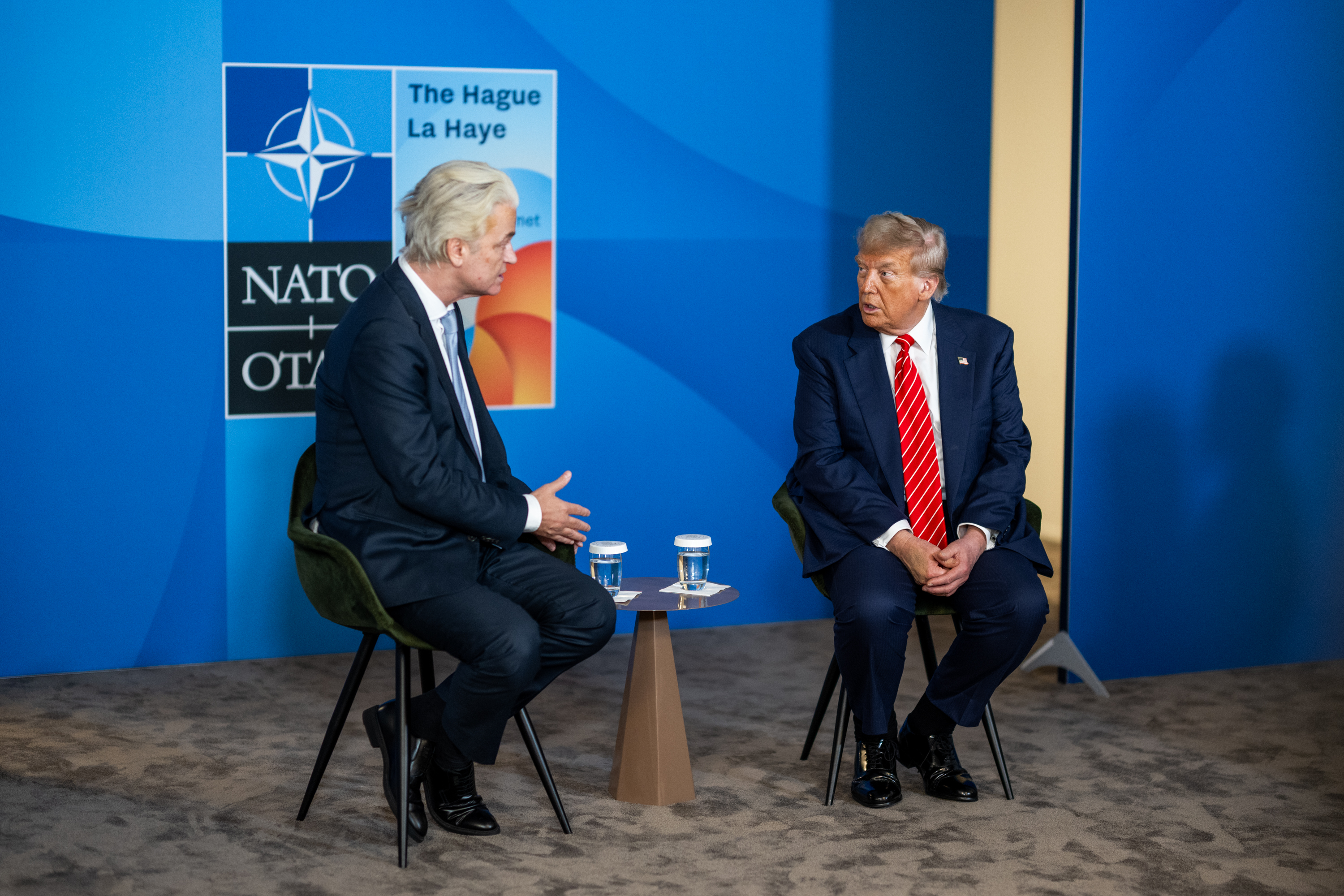
Wilders with US President Donald Trump in June 2025

In August 2010, Wilders announced that he would speak at a rally on 11 September in New York to protest the plans for Park51, a Muslim community center with a prayer space to be built near the World Trade Center site. The rally, to be held on the ten-year anniversary of the 11 September 2001 attacks, was organised by Stop Islamization of America.

In political circles in The Netherlands, the announcement caused widespread irritation about his plan. Christian Democrat senator Hans Hillen remarked that Wilders' words could endanger Dutch interests. Former NATO general secretary Jaap de Hoop Scheffer advised Wilders not to make a speech, arguing that the international public does not know who is in the Dutch cabinet and who is in parliament and thus Wilders' speech could be mistaken as an official statement of the Dutch government. Later, Christian Democrat party leader and acting Dutch Minister of Foreign Affairs Maxime Verhagen issued a warning.

Also, the Dutch Foreign Ministry allegedly would have issued guidelines to its embassies on how to react to questions about the role being played by the PVV and Wilders in the formation of a new government. On 10 August 2010, the website of Dutch daily newspaper NRC Handelsblad published the ministry memo. The ministry itself however had declined "to confirm or deny" the authenticity of these guidelines. One question posed is how Wilders could be taking part in negotiations on forming a government coalition when he has been indicted for inciting hatred and discrimination, and for insulting a group of persons. Other questions covered possible bans on the building of new mosques, on the Quran and on Islamic schools in the Netherlands. The memo stressed that such bans would breach the Dutch constitution.

On 11 September 2010, 2,000 people gathered close by the site of a planned Muslim community center near the site of the World Trade Center attacks, on 11 September 2001, where they were addressed by Wilders who flew from The Netherlands to urge the crowd: "This is where we have (to) draw the line. We must never give a free hand to those who want to subjugate us," Wilders added. "Draw this line so that New York... will never become New Mecca."

In May 2015, Wilders was invited to an art exhibit presented by Stop Islamization of America in Garland, Texas, that offered a $10,000 prize for the best drawing of Muhammad. Towards the end of the event, two gunmen opened fire outside, injuring a police officer before being shot dead by other police officers guarding the center.

Wilders, at the invitation of Tennessee state senator Bill Ketron, attended the 2016 Republican National Convention in Cleveland, Ohio in July 2016 where Donald Trump was chosen as the presidential candidate of the Republican Party, with Governor Mike Pence as running mate. He gave a speech at a party for gay Republicans ("LBGTrump").

=== Australia ===
In 2012, Wilders was invited by the Q Society of Australia to visit Australia. In August 2012 he applied for a visa to give two speeches in October 2012. His staff and police protection officers were granted visas within three days, but Wilders was not. On 2 October 2012 Immigration Minister Chris Bowen, while stating that Wilders' views were offensive, stated that he would not block the visa application. Bowen stated:

I have decided not to intervene to deny him a visa because I believe that our democracy is strong enough, our multiculturalism robust enough and our commitment to freedom of speech entrenched enough that our society can withstand the visit of a fringe commentator from the other side of the world.

On the same day, the Q Society put out a press release criticizing the delays in issuing a visa, saying that Chris Bowen's announcement was "too little, too late" and announcing that Wilders' visit would be pushed back to February 2013 as there were still no visa documents available.

In 2015, Wilders was a keynote speaker at the foundation of the Australian Liberty Alliance party in Perth.

=== Germany ===
In March 2010, Wilders was told he is "not welcome" in the western German tourist resort of Monschau in the Eifel area, after he spent a weekend there, along with armed bodyguards. Mayor Margareta Ritter (CDU) said she was concerned that his presence tainted her town with the suspicion that it was sympathetic to his views. As a result, Monschau was said to have been unfairly connected with "extremism" in the European press.

Anyone who pollutes the integration debate in the Netherlands with poisonous right-wing populism as Wilders has, and advocates prohibition of the Koran by a comparison with Hitler's Mein Kampf, is not welcome in Monschau. I wanted to distinguish Monschau from that.

Ritter did not say whether Wilders was enjoying a short vacation in her town or had been meeting with like-minded people. A demonstration to support Wilders was announced to take place in Berlin on 17 April.

The same year local Berlin politician for the CDU René Stadtkewitz was expelled from the CDU after he invited Wilders to Germany to hold a speech. In October 2010, Wilders supported the founding of Stadtkewitz's new German Freedom Party. In April 2015, Wilders held a speech for Pegida in Dresden.

=== United Kingdom ===
==== Ban on entering ====
Lord Pearson of Rannoch and Baroness Cox, members of the House of Lords (the upper chamber of the British Parliament), invited Wilders to a show of 12 February 2009 viewing of Fitna in the Palace of Westminster. Two days before the showing, Home Secretary Jacqui Smith banned Wilders from entering the United Kingdom, labeling him an "undesirable person". Entry was denied under EU law, and reportedly supported under regulation 19 of the Immigration (European Economic Area) Regulations 2006, an EU law which allows a member state to refuse entry to individuals if they are regarded as constituting a threat to public policy, security or health. A Home Office spokesperson elaborated that "The Government opposes extremism in all its forms ... and that was the driving force behind tighter rules on exclusions for unacceptable behaviour that the Home Secretary announced in October last year".

Wilders defied the ban and took a British Midland Airways flight from Amsterdam to London Heathrow Airport on 12 February, accompanied by television crews. Upon arrival, he was quickly detained by UK Border Agency officials, and deported on one of the next flights to the Netherlands. He called Prime Minister Gordon Brown "the biggest coward in Europe" and remarked, "Of course I will come back". Wilders had visited the United Kingdom in December 2008 without any problem. In response to the ban, both Pearson and Cox accused the government of "appeasing" militant Islam.

The International Herald Tribune stated that the ban was broadly condemned in the British news media. The Dutch Foreign Secretary, Maxime Verhagen, called the decision "highly regrettable" and complained to his British counterpart. Dutch Prime Minister Jan Peter Balkenende complained to Gordon Brown about the "disappointing" decision. The Quilliam Foundation, a British think tank, criticised the ban, as did National Secular Society president Terry Sanderson. The Muslim Labour peer Lord Ahmed expressed support for Smith's ban on Wilders entering the country; the Ramadhan Foundation and the Muslim Council of Britain also did so, the council labeling Wilders "an open and relentless preacher of hate".

==== Ban overturn ====
After being declared persona non grata by Jacqui Smith, then the home secretary, in February 2009, Wilders appealed the decision to Britain's Asylum and Immigration Tribunal. In October 2009, the tribunal overturned the ban. Wilders subsequently praised the ruling as "a triumph for freedom of speech" and stated that he planned to visit the United Kingdom in the near future.

The ruling was criticized by the British Home Office, which stated that an appeal of the tribunal's ruling is being considered. A spokesman stated:

The Government opposes extremism in all its forms. The decision to refuse Wilders admission was taken on the basis that his presence could have inflamed tensions between our communities and have led to inter-faith violence. We still maintain this view.

==== Visits ====
On 16 October 2009, Wilders arrived in the United Kingdom and was quickly forced to move his press conference due to protests by about forty members of the organization Islam4UK, an organization that was later shut down under the UK's Terrorism Act 2000 on 14 January 2010. Although the Home Office had said that his entry into the country would not be blocked, a spokesman said his "statements and behaviour during a visit will inevitably impact on any future decisions to admit him". His visit to the UK met with protest, but Wilders called it "a victory" in a press conference. On his outspoken views on Islam, he said: "I have a problem with the Islamic ideology, the Islamic culture, because I feel that the more Islam that we get in our societies the less freedom we get." He opened the press conference with a quote from George Orwell's preface to Animal Farm: "If liberty means anything at all, it means the right to tell people what they don't want to hear". Lord Pearson, who had invited him, said his arrival was

a celebration of the victory of freedom of speech over those who would prevent it in this country, particularly the Islamists, the violent Jihadists who are on the march across the world and in the UK.

In January 2010, Wilders was invited again to show his anti-Quran film Fitna in the British House of Lords by UK Independence Party (UKIP) Lord Pearson, and cross-bencher Baroness Cox. Wilders accepted the invitation and was present for a showing of the film in the House of Lords on 5 March. In his speech he quoted ominous words from Winston Churchill's book The River War from 1899:

Mohammedanism is a militant and proselytizing faith. No stronger retrograde force exists in the World. It has already spread throughout Central Africa, raising fearless warriors at every step ... the civilization of modern Europe might fall, as fell the civilization of ancient Rome.

At the ensuing press conferences, he called the Islamic prophet Muhammad a "barbarian, a mass murderer, and a pedophile" and referred to Islam as a "fascist ideology" that was "violent, dangerous, and retarded". Wilders also reportedly called Turkish Prime Minister Erdoğan a "total freak". Dutch Prime Minister Jan-Peter Balkenende called these comments "irresponsible", and Maxime Verhagen, Dutch caretaker Minister of Foreign Affairs, publicly condemned Wilders's remarks and behaviour:

He incites discord among people in a distasteful manner. And in the meantime he damages the interests of the Dutch population and the reputation of the Netherlands in the world.

Bernard Wientjes, the president of the Dutch employers' organization Confederation of Netherlands Industry and Employers (VNO-NCW), also accused Wilders of "seriously" damaging Dutch interests abroad. He called it outrageous that Wilders had presented himself in London as "the next Dutch prime minister" and then derided Turkish Prime Minister Erdoğan. Emphasizing that three-quarters of the Dutch GDP comes from revenue earned abroad, according to Wientjes, Wilders poses "a serious threat to the Netherlands and the Dutch economy".

== Electoral history ==
Electoral history of Geert Wilders
Year	Body	Party	Pos.	Votes	Result		Ref.
Year	Body	Party	Pos.	Votes	Party seats	Individual	Ref.
1998	House of Representatives	VVD	45	274	38 / 150	Lost	
2002	House of Representatives	VVD	30	2,522	24 / 150	Lost	
2003	House of Representatives	VVD	14	4,763	28 / 150	Won	
2006	House of Representatives	PVV	1	566,197	9 / 150	Won	
2010	The Hague Municipal Council	PVV	20 (Note: Wilders participated as his party's lijstduwer.)		8 / 45	Won	
2010	House of Representatives	PVV	1	1,376,938	24 / 150	Won	
2012	House of Representatives	PVV	1	886,314	15 / 150	Won	
2017	House of Representatives	PVV	1	1,258,989	20 / 150	Won	
2021	House of Representatives	PVV	1	1,004,605	17 / 150	Won	
2023	House of Representatives	PVV	1	2,230,371	37 / 150	Won	
2024	European Parliament	PVV	20	334,356	6 / 31	Won (Note: Wilders received enough preference votes to be elected despite his party's result. However, he declined his seat.)	
2025	House of Representatives	PVV	1	1,666,202	26 / 150	Won	

== Awards and recognition ==
- Oriana Fallaci Free Speech Award in 2009
- Nominated for Sakharov Prize in 2010
- Dutch Politician of the Year 2010
- Dutch Politician of the Year 2013
- Dutch Politician of the Year 2015
- Dutch Politician of the Year 2016
- Dutch Politician of the Year 2024 (along with Henri Bontenbal)
- The Hungarian Order of Merit in 2022

== Bibliography ==
In Dutch

- Kies voor vrijheid: een eerlijk antwoord [Choose freedom: an honest answer]. 2005. OCLC 6505104.
- Dossier Wilders, Uitspraken van de meest besproken Nederlandse politicus van deze eeuw [The Wilders file, Statements by the most discussed Dutch politician of this century]. House of knowledge. 2010. ISBN 978-90-8510-920-4. OCLC 642690188.

In English

- Marked for Death: Islam's War Against the West and Me. Washington DC: Regnery. 2012. ISBN 978-1-59698-796-8. OCLC 787506734.

== See also ==
- Bibliography of books critical of Islam
- Criticism of multiculturalism
- Multiculturalism in the Netherlands
- Philosemitism – Affinity towards the Jewish people

== Sources ==
- Blok, Arthur (2018). Zo gek is het worden: Geert Wilders, van eenmansfractie tot brede volksbeweging (in Dutch). Just Publisher. ISBN 978-90-8975-632-9.
- Fennema, Meindert; Waling, Geerten (2024). Wilders: De wreker [Geert Wilders: The avenger] (in Dutch). Prometheus. ISBN 978-90-446-5619-0.
- Vossen, Koen (2013). Rondom Wilders (in Dutch). Amsterdam: Boom. ISBN 978-94-6105-522-4.
- Vossen, Koen (12 August 2016). The Power of Populism: Geert Wilders and the Party for Freedom in the Netherlands. Taylor & Francis. ISBN 978-1-317-29290-6.
- Voerman, Gerrit; Vossen, Koen, eds. (2019). Wilders gewogen. 15 jaar reuring in de Nederlandse politiek (in Dutch). Amsterdam: Boom. ISBN 978-90-244-3027-7.
