= Murder of Kanhaiya Lal =

Murder case in India, 2022

- Part of 2022 Muhammad remarks controversy, Islam and blasphemy
- Location: Udaipur, Rajasthan, India
- Date: 28 June 2022
- Attack type: Murder, Beheading
- Weapons: Cleaver, dagger
- Deaths: 1
- Injuries: 1
- Victim: Kanhaiya Lal
- No. of participants: 2
- Charges: Murder, criminal conspiracy, and offences under the Unlawful Activities (Prevention) Act, 1967 and Arms Act

On 28 June 2022, Kanhaiya Lal Teli, a Hindu tailor, was murdered by two Muslim men, Mohammad Riyaz Akhtari and Ghouse Mohammad, in Udaipur, Rajasthan, India. The attackers filmed the killing and subsequently circulated a video of it online.

The killing followed a controversial social media post concerning Nupur Sharma, a former Bharatiya Janata Party spokesperson whose remarks about the Prophet Muhammad had sparked the 2022 Muhammad remarks controversy. According to Lal's complaint to the police, the controversial post had been shared on Facebook inadvertently by his son, who was playing a game on his mobile phone, and Lal said that he was not aware of the post.

According to reports, the assailants entered Lal's tailor shop pretending to be customers before attacking and killing him. They recorded the assault and subsequently uploaded a video online. In a subsequent video, the two men identified themselves and claimed responsibility for the killing while displaying the weapons used in the attack.

The killing triggered widespread protests and communal tensions. Authorities imposed a curfew in Udaipur and suspended internet services in Rajasthan to prevent further violence and the circulation of the video.

== Background ==
Kanhaiya Lal Teli (also reported as Kanhaiya Lal Sahu, born c. 1982) was a tailor from the Dhanmandi area of Udaipur and the father of two sons. He was a Hindu, and his family said that he had good relations with his Muslim neighbours.

On 11 June 2022, Lal's Muslim neighbour, Nazim Ahmed, filed a complaint against him over a social media post supporting Nupur Sharma. Lal was arrested in connection with the complaint and was released on bail the following day. In his subsequent complaint to the police, Lal stated that the social media post had been put up by his son "by mistake" while the son was playing a game on his mobile phone, and that Lal had not known about it.

On 15 June, Lal complained to the police that he was receiving death threats and that people had been conducting reconnaissance around his shop. He named his neighbours among those he alleged were threatening him and said they were preventing him from opening his shop. Police subsequently mediated between Lal, the neighbours he had named, and community leaders from both the Hindu and Muslim communities. The police said the matter was resolved, after which Lal gave a written statement that he did not want further police action.

== Murder ==
One of the accused, Mohammad Riyaz Akhtari, had made a video on 17 June, days before the attack, in which he stated his intention to kill Kanhaiya Lal Teli over remarks concerning the Prophet Muhammad, and said he wanted to make the video "viral".

On 28 June, two Muslim men, Mohammad Riyaz Akhtari and Ghouse Mohammad, entered Lal's tailoring shop posing as customers. When Lal began taking measurements for one of them, they attacked him with cleavers at about 2:45 p.m. and recorded the assault on video. After subduing Lal, the two accused dragged him out of the shop and slit his throat with a makeshift dagger made at their welding workshop, killing him by beheading. Lal was stabbed in different parts of the body. A shop assistant who attempted to intervene also sustained severe head injuries. The assailants fled on foot and then drove away on a motorcycle.

A post-mortem examination found 26 injury marks on Lal's body, including injuries to the neck, head, hands, back and chest; reports based on the examination also described 13 deep cuts, most around the neck.

In a subsequent video, the accused displayed the weapons and claimed that the killing was carried out to avenge an alleged insult to Islam and also made threats against India's Prime Minister Narendra Modi.

== Aftermath ==
After the incident, the local markets in the area were shut down and the traders demanded arrest of the accused. Protests demanding immediate action were staged in various parts of India.

Local authorities of Udaipur imposed a 24-hour curfew and blocked internet access across the state of Rajasthan. The central government deployed the National Investigation Agency, India's primary counterterrorism unit, to investigate the incident. The police said that the perpetrators had attempted to behead Kanhaiya during the attack but had failed. Media organizations, such as The Hindu and the BBC, however, reported that Lal had been beheaded.

On 28 June, the Rajasthan government announced a compensation of ₹50 lakh (US$52,000) for the family of Kanhaiya. On 6 July, the government announced jobs for Kanhaiya's two sons.

On 2 July, Bharatiya Janata Party leader Kapil Mishra visited the family of Kanhaiya Lal, where he announced a compensation of ₹1 crore (US$100,000) for the family of Kanhaiya. Further, he announced compensation amounting to ₹25 lakh (US$26,000) for Ishvar, who was also wounded in the attack, and of ₹5 lakh (US$5,200) to a police constable, Sandeep, who had been injured by a violent mob.

== Reactions ==
Rajasthan CM Ashok Gehlot accused the BJP of having involvement in the murder and added "The culprits have links with the BJP. Police had arrested them in some other case, but BJP leaders visited the police station to get them released." In response to the murder, nearly 7000 people took out silent protest march in the city of Udaipur.

United Nations spokesperson Stéphane Dujarric called for religious harmony and peace globally in response to Kanhaiya Lal's murder.

The All India Muslim Personal Law Board (AIMPLB) condemned the murder stating, "taking law into your own hands is highly condemnable, regrettable and un-Islamic" and added, "Neither the law nor the Islamic Sharia allow it." Head of Jamiat Ulema-e-Hind, Maulana Mahmood Madani stated, "Udaipur incident is a disgrace to humanity; It is disgrace to humanity & an act of defaming Islam. No matter whosoever is a killer, no one has the authority to take the law and order into his own hands." Religious body Jamaat-e-Islami Hind called the incident "barbaric, Uncivilized and there is no room for Justification of violence in Islam. Peace should not be disturbed. Nobody should try to take advantage of this ugly crime". Shahabuddin Razvi of the Barelvi All India Tanzeem Ulama-e-Islam also condemned the attack, stating "Muslims should not take the law in their own hands, complain to the government, it is the government's job to punish."

Hindu organisations like the Vishva Hindu Parishad and the Bajrang Dal staged protests and demanded strict action against the culprits. Although the Rashtriya Swayamsevak Sangh remained silent, RSS-linked Muslim Rashtriya Manch demanded capital punishment for the accused.

Dutch politician Geert Wilders condemned the incident and cautioned the Indian Hindus against "appeasement of Muslims".

Amnesty International condemned the incident and urged the Indian government to take action against the accused.

== In popular culture ==
A Hindi-language film titled Udaipur Files, directed by Bharat S. Srinate and produced by Amit Jani, was announced in 2024 and was initially scheduled for theatrical release on 11 July 2025. The film is based on the 2022 murder of tailor Kanhaiya Lal in Udaipur and seeks to dramatize the events surrounding the incident. Following the release of its trailer, the film sparked major controversy, with several civil rights groups and individuals alleging that it promotes communal hatred and vilifies the Muslim community.

On 10 July 2025, the Delhi High Court imposed a stay order on the release of the film in response to a petition filed by Maulana Arshad Madani, president of Jamiat Ulama-e-Hind, along with journalist Prashant Tandon and others. The petition was argued by Senior Advocate Kapil Sibal, who described the film as "a worse form of hate speech" and claimed it could incite violence and disrupt public order. The petitioners also argued that the film could compromise the fair trial of accused individuals. The High Court directed the petitioners to seek review under Section 6 of the Cinematograph Act and asked the Central Government to decide on the film’s certification. The matter is currently under judicial consideration. The film flopped, and its producer Amit Jani criticized the Hindu community for not supporting it.

== See also ==
- Murder of Umesh Kolhe
- Kamlesh Tiwari
- Murder of Rinku Sharma
- Lynching of Priyantha Kumara
- Murder of Samuel Paty
- Murder of Lee Rigby
- Blasphemy in India
- Internet censorship in India
- Beheading video
- Jyllands-Posten Muhammad cartoons controversy
- Islam and blasphemy
