= Udaipur Files =

2025 film by Bharat S. Shrinate and Jayant Sinha

- Theatrical release poster
- Directed by: Bharat S. Shrinate; Jayant Sinha
- Written by: Bharat Singh; Jayant Sinha; Amit Jani
- Produced by: Amit Jani
- Starring: Vijay Raaz; Rajneesh Duggal; Preeti Jhangiani; Puneet Vashistha; Jayshree Mahto; Mohit Mahawar; Aditya Raghav; Mushtaq Khan; Ahsan Khan
- Cinematography: Mukesh Gnanesh
- Production company: Jani Firefox Films
- Distributed by: Reliance Entertainment
- Release date: 8 August 2025
- Running time: 125 minutes
- Country: India
- Language: Hindi
- Box office: est. ₹63 lakh

Udaipur Files: Kanhaiya Lal Tailor Murder is a 2025 Indian Hindi language crime thriller co-directed by Bharat S. Shrinate and Jayant Sinha, co-written by Amit Jani, Bharat Singh, and Jayant Sinha, and distributed by Reliance Entertainment. The film stars Vijay Raaz, Rajneesh Duggal and Preeti Jhangiani and is inspired by the events surrounding the murder of Kanhaiya Lal on 28 June 2022.

Initially titled Gyanvapi Files: A Tailor's Murder Story, the film was released on 8 August 2025 to mixed reviews from critics and audiences, eventually bombing at the box office.

== Synopsis ==
The film is based on the murder of Kanhaiya Lal in Udaipur. Ishwar Singh, an intelligence officer, is assigned to investigate. As he digs deeper, he finds links to Islamic terrorism and radical groups. The story portrays that the murder was not random, but a planned act with deep connections to extremism and hidden networks.

== Cast ==
- Vijay Raaz as Kanhaiya Lal Sahu
- Rajneesh Duggal as Ishwar Singh, Intelligence Bureau officer
- Preeti Jhangiani as Anjana Singh, journalist, wife of Ishwar Singh
- Kamlesh Sawant
- Kanchi Singh as Chitra
- Puneet Vashist as Nizam
- Jayshree Mahto as Jasoda Sahu, wife of Kanhaiya Lal
- Mohit Mahawar as Tarun Sahu, younger son of Kanhaiya Lal
- Aditya Raghav as Yash Sahu, elder son of Kanhaiya Lal
- Mushtaq Khan as Virendra Kumar Meena
- Ahsan Khan as Veer Pratap Singh
- Gagandeep Singh as Abhaypal Singh, Intelligence Bureau officer

== Controversy ==
Udaipur Files has been mired in controversy due to its depiction of the Kanhaiya Lal murder, with petitioners alleging it promotes hate speech, vilifies the Muslim community, and could prejudice the ongoing trial in a Special NIA Court in Jaipur.

On July 9, 2025, the Supreme Court declined an urgent hearing on a plea by Mohammed Javed, an accused in the murder case, who argued that the film's release would violate his right to a fair trial by portraying the accused as guilty.

On July 9, the Delhi High Court ordered the producers to arrange a private screening for petitioners, including Jamiat Ulama-i-Hind and journalist Prashant Tandon, who sought a permanent ban.

After the screening, Senior Advocate Kapil Sibal, representing Jamiat Ulama-i-Hind, described the film as “cinematic vandalism” and argued it fueled communal disharmony, citing scenes like a Muslim man throwing meat at a Hindu household and the arrest of Muslim students, which he deemed irrelevant to the core story.

The Central Board of Film Certification (CBFC) countered that it had removed 55 objectionable portions, ensuring the film was not community-specific but focused on the crime.

On July 10, 2025, the Delhi High Court, led by Chief Justice Devendra Kumar Upadhyaya and Justice Anish Dayal, stayed the film's release, directing petitioners to file a revision application under Section 6 of the Cinematograph Act, 1952, with the Ministry of Information and Broadcasting within two days.

The court ruled that the release would remain stayed until the Central Government decided on the revision, citing concerns about communal harmony and public order, especially with upcoming state elections.

The producers, represented by Advocate Gaurav Bhatia, appealed to the Supreme Court on July 14, arguing the stay violated their freedom of speech and that the CBFC had already approved the film after extensive cuts.

On July 16, 2025, the Supreme Court, led by Justices Surya Kant and Joymalya Bagchi, deferred the hearing to July 21, expecting a Central Government committee to review the CBFC certification under Section 6.

Following the film's release and its subsequent box-office failure, producer Amit Jani claimed that individuals from Bangladesh were attempting to mislead local audiences and incite violence against him. A threatening remark was reportedly made by a man named Mohammad Shahid, who was later detained by police for questioning. Jani also posted a video on X, expressing his disappointment following the film's poor performance at the box-office, and directing his ire towards the audience for ignoring his film, stating that "they instead spent money on watching films like War 2, Coolie and Saiyaara", and that "it was a good news for Muslims".

On August 25, 2025, the Meerut Police arrested four people, including a corporator of All India Majlis-e-Ittehadul Muslimeen (AIMIM), on charges of burning the film's posters and raising "objectionable slogans."

== Release ==
The film's release was originally scheduled for 11 July 2025 but was stayed by the Delhi High Court on July 10, 2025, pending a Central Government review of its certification due to concerns about communal disharmony and prejudice to an ongoing trial. After multiple modifications, it was eventually released on 8 August 2025, opening on 4,500 screens across India.

== Reception ==
Amit Bhatia of ABP News gave the film 3 stars out of 5, remarking that while it didn't quite do justice to the gravity of its subject, Raaz's performance and the weight of the real-life tragedy made it worth a watch. The Free Press Journal gave the film 2 stars out of 5, calling it a well-intentioned film, while also remarking that it faltered due to the weak screenplay and narration, and criticizing the music and background score.

Rishabh Suri of Hindustan Times gave the film 1.5 stars out of 5, finding it unfocused, dabbling in religion, politics, and romance, repeatedly starting subplots only to abandon them, and the production values visibly low. Subhash K Jha of News 24 gave the film 0.5 stars out of 5, labelling it as a one-sided, inflammatory, and highly provocative story, and feeling that the tone and pitch of the storytelling suggested that the entire community was responsible for the crime.

=== Box office ===
The film was commercially unsuccessful, earning only ₹0.63 crore as of 16 August.
