= Murder of Nikita Tomar =

Abduction, and murder incident in India

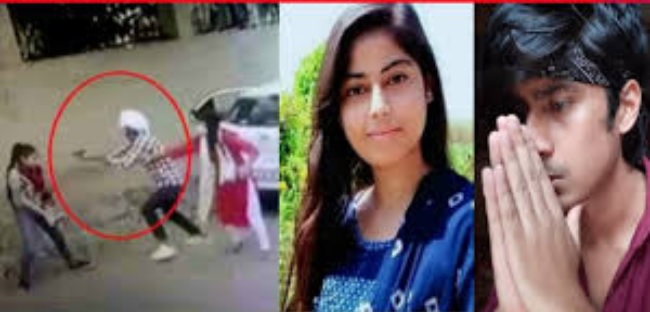
- Left: attack, Middle: Nikita Tomar, Right: convict
- Location: Ballabhgarh, Haryana, India
- Date: 26 October 2020
- Victim: Nikita Tomar
- Perpetrators: Taushif and Rehman
- Assailants: 2
- Motive: Forced abduction
- Charges: IPC-302 Murder
- Verdict: Life imprisonment

Nikita Tomar, a 20-year-old Indian student, was shot dead by Tausif, a young man (accompanied by his friend Rehman), outside her college in the town of Ballabhgarh in Faridabad district, Haryana, on 26 October 2020. Tausif wanted her to marry her and allegedly convert to Islam, both of which she refused. The incident was recorded on CCTV, which led to the arrests of two men, both of whom were fellow students. On 23 March 2021, two men were convicted of her murder by a fast-track court and were imprisoned for life.

== Incident ==
=== Background ===
Tomar's family was originally from the state of Uttar Pradesh. Her family told the press after her death that she had intended to join the Indian Army, following in the footsteps of several members of her family who had served in the military. Tomar was studying at the Rawal International School in Nangla, and later at Aggarwal College, in Haryana, where she was studying for a bachelor's degree in Commerce. According to Tomar's family, she met one of the men convicted for her murder, Tausif, at this school, where he was a fellow student.

In 2018, Tomar's family filed a police complaint alleging that Tausif had abducted her from outside Aggarwal College and confined her for three days, and that they had filed a criminal complaint about this. According to Tomar's family, they were forced to withdraw the complaint because they allege that Tausif's family exerted political influence. Tomar's father later stated to press that Tausif had stalked Tomar for a little while after the incident, but had later stopped and had no contact with her in the past two years. The case concerning this abduction has been re-opened and is currently being investigated.

=== Murder ===
On 26 October 2020, Tomar was standing outside Aggarwal College with two friends, after writing an exam, and waiting for her brother to pick her up. CCTV footage outside the college captured two men, one with his face covered by a white cloth, drive up in a white Hyundai elite i20 and attempt to force Tomar into the car. Tomar can be seen on the video resisting, after which the man with the covered face shot her at point-blank range. Several persons can be seen walking by on the footage, but there were no attempts to intervene in the incident. Tomar was shot in the neck and collapsed, while the attackers left in the car. Tomar was taken to a local hospital, where she died from her injuries.

Tomar's father stated that right before the murder, Tausif had, after two years of no contact, asked Tomar to convert to Islam and marry him, and that Tomar had refused.

=== Investigation and Trial ===
Immediately after the incident, Tomar's brother filed a first information report with the police stating that Tausif, who had studied in the same school as Tomar and was alleged to have abducted her in 2018, was responsible for her death. Based on this information, Tausif was arrested the same day. Eleven days after the incident, the Faridabad police filed a chargesheet in a district court, charging Tausif as well another man, Rehman, of the offences of criminal conspiracy, murder, abduction with intention to compel marriage and abduction with intent to murder, as well as for offences for illegally possessing firearms under the Arms Act, and listing digital and forensic evidence in addition to several eyewitnesses. Tausif and Rehman were remanded to jail. A third person, Tausif's uncle, who had been accused of illegally supplying Tausif with the gun used in the incident, was also arrested. As per media reports, Tausif confessed to Police after the arrest that he shot Nikita Tomar but retracted his statement later mentioning they have been implicated for the act they did not commit or even not physically present.

The trial for Tomar's murder was conducted at a District and Sessions Court in Faridabad which had been designated a fast-track court established to hear cases concerning crimes against women. Eyewitnesses, including Tomar's friends who were standing with her outside the college, at the time of the incident provided testimony. In addition, CCTV footage of the incident, as well as forensic evidence from the car used at the murder, were presented in court. An appeal by Tausif and Rehman to re-investigate the case had been previously dismissed in February 2021. The defence counsel argued that the weapon recovered by the police did not have Taufiq's fingerprints on it.

On 24 March 2021, the District and Sessions Court held Tausif and Rehman guilty of murder and criminal conspiracy to murder, and also held Tausif guilty for illegal possession of arms. Tausif's uncle, who had been arrested and charged with supplying the firearm in question, was acquitted. On 26 March 2021, the Court passed the sentencing order, giving both Tausif and Rehman life imprisonment and levying a fine of ₹20,000 (equivalent to ₹24,000 or US$250 in 2026) on each of them for the murder, as well as five years and a fine of ₹2,000 (equivalent to ₹2,400 or US$25 in 2026) for the offense of conspiracy and abduction. In addition, Tausif was sentenced to five years' imprisonment and a fine of ₹5,000 (equivalent to ₹6,100 or US$64 in 2026) for violating the Arms Act. The sentences will run concurrently.

== Public response and aftermath ==
Karni Sena claimed that Tomar's death was part of a planned program of forced religious conversions by Muslim men against Hindu women also known as "love jihad." One demonstration organised in Ballabhgarh to protest against such claims concerning 'love jihad' in connection with Tomar's death became violent, resulting in ten policeman suffering injuries and 32 persons being arrested in connection with violence. As several of those arrested had also tested positive for COVID-19, all persons who attended the protest were subsequently quarantined as well. The Uttar Pradesh police stated that persons participating in the protest had been organizing the event on WhatsApp groups on which they had been sharing "... inflammatory messages that instigated violence." A similar protest held in Delhi about Tomar's death involved protestors calling for Muslim genocide, encouraging violence against Muslims and stating, "Mulle ka na qazi ka, ye desh hai Veer Shivaji ka (This is Chhatrapati Shivaji Maharaj’s country, not of Muslims' religious leaders)". Haryana's Home Minister Anil Vij announced that the state would be enacting a 'love jihad' law following the incident. Vij, a member of the Bharatiya Janata Party, stated that Tausif's family was connected to the Congress party and alleging that they were attempting to politically influence the outcome of the case.

The Chair of the National Commission for Women, Rekha Sharma, made a statement to the press after the Sessions Court passed the order of conviction, calling for the imposition of the death penalty, and stating, "Her parents educated her and thought that she was going to be self-dependent. That girl was murdered in a gruesome manner. I would like to demand to give capital punishment."

He has gone on to identify failures in Indian law to address the issue of stalking, stating, "It is not about Hindus or Muslims. We need a stringent law so that these obsessive stalkers don’t even dare to look at our daughters." Later, Tomar's father is reported by Daily News and Analysis to have said that a law prohibiting 'love jihad' would have saved his daughter.
