= Kamlesh Tiwari =

Indian politician (1969–2019)

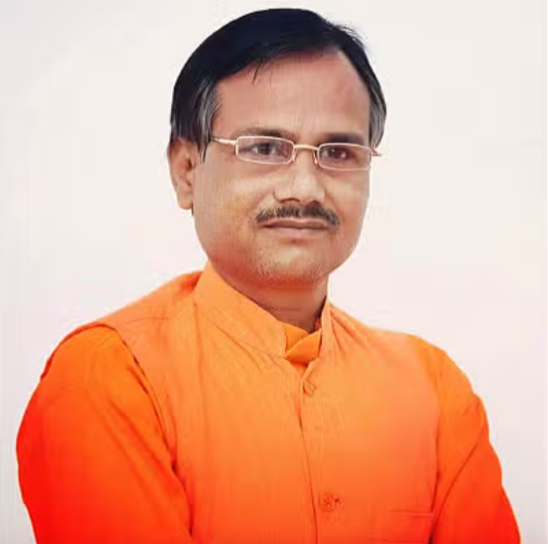
- Born: 16 January 1969; Para Kothba, Uttar Pradesh, India
- Died: 18 October 2019 (aged 50); Lucknow, Uttar Pradesh, India
- Cause of death: Assassination by stabbing
- Political party: Hindu Samaj Party
- Spouse: Kiran Tiwari
- Children: 3 sons

Kamlesh Tiwari (16 January 1969 – 18 October 2019) was an Indian politician who founded the Hindu Samaj Party in 2017.

Azam Khan, a politician from the Samajwadi Party, responded to Union finance minister Arun Jaitley's statements in support of decriminalization of homosexuality, by labelling members of Rashtriya Swayamsevak Sangh as "homosexuals". Tiwari retaliated with comments about Islam's prophet Muhammad, which were considered derogatory by Indian Muslims, who protested, with some people calling for beheading Tiwari.

Tiwari was subsequently arrested, charged under the National Security Act, and jailed for a few months by the Uttar Pradesh Police, before his release and subsequent murder in October 2019. Thirteen people were charged by the UP police in relation to the killing: 8 have been charged for murder and conspiracy, and the other 5 for harboring the killers and concealing evidence. The main accused was granted bail by the Supreme Court on 25 July 2024.

== Early life and career ==
Tiwari was born in Para Kothba village, in Uttar Pradesh's Sitapur district, in the early 1970s. In 1980, his family moved to the nearby town of Mahmoodabad, when his father got a job as a priest at the local Ram-Janki temple. The family stayed at an accommodation provided within the shrine. Tiwari grew up there during the heyday of the ram temple movement in Ayodhya.

Tiwari was attracted to the Hindutva form of Hindu nationalism in the 1990s. He organized groups of young Hindutva warriors who marched from Lucknow to Ayodhya and participated in the demolition of the Babri mosque at a disputed religious site. He later joined the Bajrang Dal, and was said to admire leaders such as Ashok Singhal, Lal Krishna Advani, Sadhvi Rithambara, and Uma Bharati.

He claimed to be the president of Hindu Mahasabha, and also founded the Hindu Samaj Party in 2017. Tiwari contested the Uttar Pradesh legislative assembly election, from Lucknow, in 2012, and attempted to gain a Lok Sabha seat, from Faizabad, in the 2019 Indian general election, but was defeated both times.

== Controversy ==
Indian Union finance minister Arun Jaitley, who belonged to Bharatiya Janata Party (BJP), supported decriminalization of homosexuality. In response to that statement, on 2 December 2015 Azam Khan, a member of the Samajwadi Party, reportedly labelled members of Rashtriya Swayamsevak Sangh (RSS) – the ideological arm of Bharatiya Janata Party (BJP) – as homosexuals, because they don't marry. The next day, Kamlesh Tiwari responded to Azam Khan's statement by calling Mohammad a homosexual.

About one hundred thousand Muslims protested in Muzaffarnagar, with some demanding the death penalty for Tiwari, (the death penalty being reserved in India for the "rarest of rare" crimes), with some demanding that he be "beheaded" for "insulting" Muhammad. Rallies protesting his statement were held by several Islamic groups in other parts of India, some of them demanding the death penalty.

On 3 December 2015, Tiwari was arrested in Lucknow by Uttar Pradesh police, for his remarks on 2 December, and charged under the National Security Act by the Samajwadi Party-led Uttar Pradesh state government. He was jailed for several months for his comment, having been charged under Indian Penal Code sections 153-A (promoting enmity between groups on the grounds of religion and doing acts prejudicial to maintenance of harmony) and 295-A (deliberate and malicious acts, intended to outrage religious feelings of any class by insulting its religion or religious beliefs).

The protests demanding capital punishment for Tiwari triggered counter-protests by Hindu groups who accused Muslim groups of demanding enforcement of Islamic law and laws against blasphemy in India. His detention under National Security Act was revoked by the Allahabad High Court on 30 September 2016.

== Murder ==
On 18 October 2019, Tiwari was murdered by Farid-ud-din Shaikh and Ashfak Shaikh, in his office-cum-residence in Lucknow. The assailants came dressed in saffron kurtas to give him a box of sweets marked with the address of a sweet shop in Surat city in Gujarat. Tiwari's aide Saurashtrajeet Singh was sent to bring cigarettes for them and when he returned he found Tiwari lying with his throat slit. According to police officials, the assailants had a revolver and knife inside the sweets box. During the attack, one assailant slit Tiwari's throat while another fired at him. He was declared dead during treatment at a hospital's trauma centre.

According to the post-mortem report, he was stabbed 15 times and shot once.

=== Investigation ===
Two ISIS suspects previously detained by the Anti-Terrorism Squad (ATS) of Gujarat, had indicated that they wanted to kill Kamlesh Tiwari in 2017. The Al-Hind Brigade, a lesser known group, claimed responsibility for the death of Tiwari. By 19 October 2019, six accused of being involved in the murder of Tiwari—including Khurshid Ahmed Pathan, Faizan Pathan, and Maulana Mohsin Sheikh—were detained by the Surat Police, Gujarat ATS, and Uttar Pradesh police. The police used CCTV footage from the sweet shop in Surat.

According to the police, the pistol used in the murder was bought in Surat and the murder was planned in Dubai. They also confirmed that Tiwari's comment on Muhammad was the motive for his murder.

=== Court proceedings ===
On 9 April 2024, the Allahabad High Court denied bail to the accused in the case. This decision was overturned on 25 July 2024 when the main accused was granted bail by the Supreme Court from the two judge bench of A. S. Oka and Augustine George Masih.

== See also ==
- List of assassinated Indian politicians
- Murder of Nikita Tomar
- Murder of Kanhaiya Lal
- LGBTQ people and Islam
