= Nupur Sharma =

Indian politician (born 1985)

Former National Spokesperson of the Bharatiya Janata Party
- In office 2020–2022
- President: J. P. Nadda

Personal details
- Born: 23 April 1985 (age 41) New Delhi, India
- Party: Bharatiya Janata Party (2005–2022)
- Education: University of Delhi (BA, LL.B.); London School of Economics (LL.M.)
- Occupation: Politician

Nupur Sharma (born 23 April 1985) is an Indian politician. She was the national spokesperson of the Bharatiya Janata Party (BJP) until June 2022. She frequently represented BJP on Indian television debates as an official spokesperson. In June 2022, she was suspended from the party due to her comments about Muhammad and the age of his third wife, Aisha, at the time of their marriage and the consummation of the marriage as well her comments on other central doctrines in the Islamic tradition.

== Early life and education ==
Nupur Sharma was born in New Delhi in 1985. She comes from a family of civil servants and businessmen. Her mother is from Dehradun.

Sharma studied in the Delhi Public School, Mathura Road. Later she graduated from the Hindu College at Delhi University with a Bachelor of Arts in economics. She later completed her Bachelor of Laws at Delhi University. While a student, she had joined the Akhil Bharatiya Vidyarthi Parishad (ABVP), the student wing of the Sangh Parivar, and won the presidency of the Delhi University Students Union in 2008, breaking an eight-year-long dry spell for the ABVP. A notable incident during her stint was the leading of an ABVP mob to heckle S. A. R. Geelani in a faculty seminar on 'Communalism, Fascism and Democracy: Rhetoric and Reality'. After receiving a Master of Laws degree from the London School of Economics at the University of London, Sharma became a lawyer.

== Political career ==
Sharma became a worker of the Bharatiya Janata Party (BJP) after returning from London in 2010–2011. In 2013, she became a member of the Delhi BJP's working committee. She is said to have worked with senior leaders like Arvind Pradhan, Arun Jaitley and Amit Shah. In 2015, at age 30, she was given the ticket for contesting against Arvind Kejriwal of the Aam Aadmi Party (AAP) in the 2015 Delhi Legislative Assembly election. She lost the contest by 31,000 votes.

Afterwards, she was appointed as an official spokesperson for the BJP's Delhi unit under Manoj Tiwari. In 2020, she was appointed as a national spokesperson of BJP under the presidency of J. P. Nadda. According to a Delhi BJP leader, even when she was part of the Delhi unit, she was often sent out for TV debates on national issues because of her legal acumen, sound knowledge of national issues, and bilingual skills. She was seen as young and energetic, with regular appearances on television debates. She is often seen being brusque to opposing panellists, causing outrage on Twitter.

== Controversies ==
=== Comments about Muhammad and Islam ===
On 26 May 2022, Sharma participated in a debate on the Gyanvapi Mosque dispute on the News24, Republic Bharat, and Times Now television channel, during which she repeatedly made remarks regarding the beliefs of Islam and age of Muhammad's wife Aisha at the time of their marriage and consummation of the marriage on all the three channels. She quoted Quranic verses Sahih al-Bukhari, 5134; Book 67, Hadith 70 to support her claim. On News24, Nupur was prevented from speaking further by news reporter Manak Gupta however she did not like the rebuke. So she left the program in the middle. Later she tweeted that it is a terrible channel that she would not go on again. She made the same remarks on Islam and Prophet Mohammed when she appeared on Republic Bharat later that day at around 19:00 local time. Aishwarya, the anchor on Republic Bharat, cautioned her against making any personal comments and from offending anyone's religious sensibilities but she proceeded regardless. At 21:00 local time, she went on Times Now, and repeated the same things. She said certain things from Islamic religious books that according to her could be mocked by people. She claimed that Muslims are mocking the Hindu faith and calling the 'Shivling' claimed to have been found inside the mosque complex a fountain. According to her, she could not tolerate the continuous insult of Mahadev being received on social media, which she cleared via a tweet on X (formerly Twitter). A day later, the video clip of her comments were cut-out and shared by Mohammed Zubair, an Indian-journalist and co-founder of Alt News, on social media. Times Now deleted the video of the programme from its YouTube channel the following day. Nonetheless, Sharma tried to defend her comments and accused Zubair of heavily editing the original clip, which was denied by Pratik Sinha, the other co-founder of Alt News. Sinha stated that it was unedited and also included a longer clip which showed the context. Following this, she began receiving rape and death threats, prompting the Delhi Police to provide her with a security cover. Journalists note that Sharma has made similar comments on several TV shows.

A police FIR (First Information Report) was registered against Sharma in Mumbai the next day on the grounds of "hurting religious sentiments". A series of FIRs followed in various towns around the country including one by parliamentarian Asaduddin Owaisi in Hyderabad. A bandh (shut down) was called by a Muslim organisation in Kanpur to protest the remarks on 3 June, during which violence erupted with 40 people getting injured. A Hindu tailor named Kanhaiya Lal was murdered by 2 Islamic extremists in Rajasthan for supporting Nupur Sharma; this incidence was recorded by the extremists and shared on social media with showing how happy they were to it. In the meanwhile, Sharma's comments continued to be shared on social media especially in the Arab world. By 4 June, "insult to Prophet Mohammed" was among the top 10 trending hashtags in all the countries of Gulf Cooperation Council (GCC) and Turkey.

On 5 June, the Grand Mufti of Oman became the first significant figure from outside India to take issue with Sharma. Describing the remarks as "insolent and obscene rudeness", he called for a boycott of all Indian products and confiscation of all Indian investments in Oman. The Government of Qatar summoned the Indian ambassador and asked for an immediate condemnation and apology; The ambassador remarked Sharma to be a "fringe element" who did not reflect the views of the Government of India. The same day, Kuwait and Iran had the Indian envoys summoned and gave them protest notes. (Note: Other Muslim nations followed suit on the following days: Pakistan, Afghanistan, Saudi Arabia, Bahrain, UAE, and Indonesia.)

By the evening of 5 June, Sharma was suspended from the BJP. The party statement said, "The BJP strongly denounces insults of any religious personalities of any religion." (Note: Another BJP official of the Delhi unit, Navin Kumar Jindal, was also expelled from the party for similar remarks on social media.) Afterwards, Sharma withdrew her remarks "unconditionally". However, reiterated that they were in response to the "continuous insult and disregard" towards the Hindu deity Lord Shiva, who was often insulted by other panelists. Many Right-wing & BJP supporters, including some BJP politicians, rallied behind her and criticised the party and the government for abandoning her and buckling under international pressure. Hashtags such as "#ISupportNupurSharma" and "#ShameOnBJP" trended on Twitter.

In June, a police team of Greater Mumbai Police that had come to Delhi to question Sharma, was unable to find her despite camping for 5 days. On 20 June, in an email, she requested for a four-week extension to appear before the Kolkata Police due to threats against her life, after a complaint was lodged against her at the Narkeldanga police station.

In January 2023, she received a gun license following the death threats received after her remarks.

The Indian Supreme Court said that "her loose tongue has set the entire country on fire" and blamed her for "igniting emotions across the country". The judges also observed that "her outburst is responsible for the unfortunate incident at Udaipur" - a reference to the beheading by two Muslim men of a Hindu tailor who had supported Ms Sharma on social media platforms. The Indian Supreme Court refused to consolidate multiple FIRs filed in several states against Nupur Sharma, a decision that Supreme Court lawyers Indira Jaising and Ashish Goel criticised as going against "long-standing judicial precedents and standards of prudence and predictability in the administration of the criminal justice system."

=== Comments on Bahraich violence ===
In October 2024, Sharma claimed at a Brahmin conference in Bulandshahr that Gopal Mishra was shot "35 times" and was tortured. This claim was found to be false because the police rejected any claims about the torture and encouraged the citizens not to spread misinformation about the incident. In her apology, posted on X (formerly Twitter), Sharma wrote, “What I repeated about the late Ram Gopal Mishra was based on what I heard in the media. I was unaware of the clarifications in the postmortem report. I withdraw my statements and apologise.”
