= List of Padma Bhushan award recipients (2000–2009) =

List of recipients of a civilian award in India

Padma Bhushan
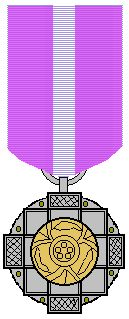
- Type: National Civilian
- Country: India
- Presented by: Government of India
- Ribbon
- Obverse: A centrally located lotus flower is embossed and the text "Padma" written in Devanagari script is placed above and the text "Bhushan" is placed below the lotus.
- Reverse: A platinum State Emblem of India placed in the centre with the national motto of India, "Satyameva Jayate" (Truth alone triumphs) in Devanagari Script
- Established: 1954
- First award: 1954

Highlights
- Total: 291

Precedence
- Next (higher): Padma Vibhushan

- Next (lower): Padma Shri

The Padma Bhushan is the third-highest civilian award of the Republic of India. Instituted on 2 January 1954, the award is given for "distinguished service of a high order", without distinction of race, occupation, position, or sex. The recipients receive a Sanad, a certificate signed by the President of India and a circular-shaped medallion with no monetary association. The recipients are announced every year on Republic Day (26 January) and registered in The Gazette of India—a publication used for official government notices and released weekly by the Department of Publication, under the Ministry of Urban Development. The conferral of the award is not considered official without its publication in the Gazette. The names of recipients whose awards have been revoked or restored, both of which processes require the authority of the president, are archived and they are required to surrender their medal when their name is struck from the register; none of the conferments of Padma Bhushan during 2000–2009 have been revoked or restored. The recommendations are received from all the state and the union territory governments, as well as from Ministries of the Government of India, the Bharat Ratna and the Padma Vibhushan awardees, the Institutes of Excellence, the Ministers, the Chief Ministers and the Governors of State, and the Members of Parliament including private individuals.

When instituted in 1954, the Padma Bhushan was classified as "Dusra Varg" (Class II) under the three-tier Padma Vibhushan awards, which were preceded by the Bharat Ratna in hierarchy. On 15 January 1955, the Padma Vibhushan was reclassified into three different awards as the Padma Vibhushan, the Padma Bhushan and the Padma Shri. The criteria included "distinguished service of a high order in any field including service rendered by Government servants", but excluded those working with the public sector undertakings with the exception of doctors and scientists. The 1954 statutes did not allow posthumous awards; this was subsequently modified in the January 1955 statute. The design was also changed to the form that is currently in use; it portrays a circular-shaped toned bronze medallion 1 3/4 inches (44 mm) in diameter and 1/8 inch (3.2 mm) thick. The centrally placed pattern made of outer lines of a square of 1 3/16 inches (30 mm) side is embossed with a knob carved within each of the outer angles of the pattern. A raised circular space of diameter 1 1/16 inches (27 mm) is placed at the centre of the decoration. A centrally located lotus flower is embossed on the obverse side of the medal and the text "Padma" is placed above and the text "Bhushan" is placed below the lotus written in Devanagari script. The State Emblem of India is displayed in the centre of the reverse side, together with the national motto of India, "Satyameva Jayate" (Truth alone triumphs) in Devanagari script, which is inscribed on the lower edge. The rim, the edges and all embossing on either side is of standard gold with the text "Padma Bhushan" of gold gilt. The medal is suspended by a pink riband 1 1/4 inches (32 mm) in width with a broad white stripe in the middle. It is ranked fifth in the order of precedence of wearing of medals and decorations of the Indian civilian and military awards. (Note: The order of precedence is: Bharat Ratna, Param Vir Chakra, Ashoka Chakra, Padma Vibhushan and Padma Bhushan.)

A total of 291 awards were presented in the 2000s – twenty awards were presented in 2000, followed by thirty-two in 2001, twenty-five in 2002, thirty-two in 2003, nineteen in 2004, thirty in 2005, thirty-seven in 2006, thirty-two in 2007, thirty-five in 2008, and thirty-one in 2009. The Padma Bhushan in the 2000s was also conferred upon 37 foreign recipients – eighteen from the United States, five each from Russia and the United Kingdom, three from Japan, two from France, and one each from China, the Czech Republic, Germany, and South Africa. Individuals from ten different fields were awarded, which includes sixty-nine artists, sixty from literature and education, forty-three from science and engineering, twenty-seven from trade and industry, twenty-six from medicine, twenty-two from public affairs, eighteen from social work, twelve from civil services, ten from other fields, and four sportspersons.

In 2003, Rashtriya Swayamsevak Sangh (RSS) volunteer Dattopant Thengadi refused to accept the award until RSS founder K. B. Hedgewar RSS ideologue M. S. Golwalkar had been offered the Bharat Ratna. Historian Romila Thapar, who had earlier refused the award in 1992, did so again in 2005. In a letter she wrote to the then President A. P. J. Abdul Kalam, she mentioned that she had refused the award when the Ministry of Human Resource Development contacted her. However, she stated she was surprised to see her name in the list of awardees. Civil servant S. R. Sankaran also refused to accept the award in 2005 without citing any reason.

== Overview ==
Award recipients by year
Year	Number of recipients
2000	20
2001	32
2002	25
2003	32
2004	19
2005	28
2006	37
2007	32
2008	35
2009	31

Award recipients by field
Field	Number of recipients
Arts	69
Civil Service	12
Literature & Education	60
Medicine	26
Others	10
Public Affairs	22
Science & Engineering	43
Social Work	18
Sports	4
Trade & Industry	27

== Recipients ==
Key
# Indicates a posthumous honour

List of Padma Bhushan award recipients, showing the year, field, and state/country
Year	Portrait	Laureates	Field	State
2000		Vasudev Kalkunte Aatre	Science & Engineering	Delhi
2000		Anil Kumar Agarwal	Others	Delhi
2000		Ram Narain Agarwal	Science & Engineering	Andhra Pradesh
2000		Sharan Rani Backliwal	Arts	Delhi
2000		Kalyan Dev	Social Work	Uttar Pradesh
2000		Veerendra Heggade	Social Work	Karnataka
2000		Pavaguda V. Indiresan	Science & Engineering	Delhi
2000		Wahiduddin Khan	Public Affairs	Delhi
2000		B. B. Lal	Science & Engineering	Delhi
2000		Raghunath Anant Mashelkar	Science & Engineering	Delhi
2000		H. Y. Sharada Prasad	Literature & Education	Delhi
2000		Rajinikanth	Arts	Tamil Nadu
2000		Begum Aizaz Rasul	Social Work	Uttar Pradesh
2000		Radha Reddy	Arts	Delhi
2000		Raja Reddy	Arts	Delhi
2000		Pakkiriswamy Chandra Sekharan	Science & Engineering	Karnataka
2000		Karamshi Jethabhai Somaiya (Note: Karamshi Jethabhai Somaiya died on 9 May 1999, at the age of 96.)#	Social Work	Maharashtra
2000		S. Srinivasan (Note: S. Srinivasan died on 1 September 1999, at the age of 58.)#	Science & Engineering	Kerala
2000		Ratan Tata	Trade & Industry	Maharashtra
2000		Harbans Singh Wasir	Medicine	Haryana
2001		Dev Anand	Arts	Maharashtra
2001		Viswanathan Anand	Sports	Tamil Nadu
2001		Amitabh Bachchan	Arts	Maharashtra
2001		Rahul Bajaj	Trade & Industry	Maharashtra
2001		B. R. Barwale	Trade & Industry	Maharashtra
2001		Balasaheb Bharde	Social Work	Maharashtra
2001		Boyi Bhimanna	Literature & Education	Andhra Pradesh
2001		Swadesh Chatterjee	Public Affairs	— (Note: Indicates a citizen of the United States)
2001		Baldev Raj Chopra	Arts	Maharashtra
2001		Ashok Desai	Public Affairs	Delhi
2001		Karimpumannil Mathai George	Literature & Education	Kerala
2001		Bhupen Hazarika	Arts	Assam
2001		Lalgudi Jayaraman	Arts	Tamil Nadu
2001		Yamini Krishnamurthy	Arts	Delhi
2001		Shiv K. Kumar	Literature & Education	Andhra Pradesh
2001		Raghunath Mohapatra	Arts	Odisha
2001		Arun Netravali	Science & Engineering	—
2001		Mohan Singh Oberoi	Trade & Industry	Delhi
2001		Rajendra K. Pachauri	Others	Delhi
2001		Abdul Karim Parekh	Social Work	Maharashtra
2001		Amrita Patel	Trade & Industry	Gujarat
2001		Pran	Arts	Maharashtra
2001		Aroon Purie	Literature & Education	Delhi
2001		Bhupathiraju Vissam Raju	Trade & Industry	Andhra Pradesh
2001		Bhanumathi Ramakrishna	Arts	Tamil Nadu
2001		Sundaram Ramakrishnan	Social Work	Maharashtra
2001		Chitranjan Singh Ranawat	Medicine	—
2001		Palle Rama Rao	Science & Engineering	Andhra Pradesh
2001		Raj Reddy	Science & Engineering	—
2001		Kum Uma Sharma	Arts	Delhi
2001		L. Subramaniam	Arts	Karnataka
2001		Naresh Kumar Trehan	Medicine	Delhi
2002		Gary Ackerman	Public Affairs	—
2002		H. P. S. Ahluwalia	Social Work	Delhi
2002		Prabha Atre	Arts	Maharashtra
2002		Sushantha Kumar Bhattacharyya	Public Affairs	— (Note: Indicates a citizen of the United Kingdom)
2002		Chandu Borde	Sports	Maharashtra
2002		Eugene Chelyshev	Literature & Education	— (Note: Indicates a citizen of Russia)
2002		Pravinchandra Varjivan Gandhi	Trade & Industry	Maharashtra
2002		Shobha Gurtu	Arts	Maharashtra
2002		Henning Holck-Larsen	Trade & Industry	Maharashtra
2002		Zakir Hussain	Arts	Maharashtra
2002		B. K. S. Iyengar	Literature & Education	Maharashtra
2002		Faquir Chand Kohli	Science & Engineering	Maharashtra
2002		V. C. Kulandaiswamy	Science & Engineering	Tamil Nadu
2002		Gury Marchuk	Science & Engineering	—
2002		Jagat Singh Mehta	Civil Service	Rajasthan
2002		Ismail Merchant	Arts	Maharashtra
2002		Mario Miranda	Literature & Education	Goa
2002		Frank Pallone	Public Affairs	—
2002		Ramanujam Varatharaja Perumal	Science & Engineering	Kerala
2002		Natesan Rangabashyam	Medicine	Tamil Nadu
2002		Maharaja Krishna Rasgotra	Civil Service	Delhi
2002		Habib Tanvir	Arts	Madhya Pradesh
2002		Kottayan Katankot Venugopal	Public Affairs	Delhi
2002		Nirmal Verma	Literature & Education	Delhi
2002		K. J. Yesudas	Arts	Kerala
2003		Teejan Bai	Arts	Chhattisgarh
2003		Ammannur Madhava Chakyar	Arts	Kerala
2003		Prabhu Chawla	Others	Delhi
2003		Herbert Fischer	Public Affairs	— (Note: Indicates a citizen of Germany)
2003		Jamshyd Godrej	Trade & Industry	Maharashtra
2003		Coluthur Gopalan	Medicine	Delhi
2003		Parasaran Kesava Iyengar	Public Affairs	Delhi
2003		B. Rajam Iyer	Arts	Tamil Nadu
2003		Shri Krishna Joshi	Science & Engineering	Haryana
2003		Madurai N. Krishnan	Arts	Tamil Nadu
2003		Rajinder Kumar	Science & Engineering	Karnataka
2003		Ramesh Kumar	Medicine	Delhi
2003		Purshotam Lal	Medicine	Uttar Pradesh
2003		Sitakant Mahapatra	Literature & Education	Odisha
2003		Bagicha Singh Minhas	Science & Engineering	Delhi
2003		Subhash Mukhopadhyay	Literature & Education	West Bengal
2003		P. S. Narayanaswamy	Arts	Tamil Nadu
2003		Arcot Ramachandran	Science & Engineering	Karnataka
2003		Trichur V. Ramachandran	Arts	Tamil Nadu
2003		Kantilal Hastimal Sancheti	Medicine	Maharashtra
2003		T. V. Sankaranarayanan	Arts	Tamil Nadu
2003		Naseeruddin Shah	Arts	Maharashtra
2003		T. V. R. Shenoy	Others	Delhi
2003		Jagjit Singh	Arts	Maharashtra
2003		Ram Badan Singh	Science & Engineering	Delhi
2003		Hari Shankar Singhania	Trade & Industry	Delhi
2003		Umayalpuram K. Sivaraman	Arts	Tamil Nadu
2003		Narayanan Srinivasan	Science & Engineering	Tamil Nadu
2003		Padma Subrahmanyam	Arts	Tamil Nadu
2003		Swapna Sundari	Arts	Delhi
2003		O. V. Vijayan	Literature & Education	Kerala
2003		Herbert Alexandrovich Yefremov	Science & Engineering	—
2004		Soumitra Chatterjee	Arts	West Bengal
2004		Chandrashekhar Shankar Dharmadhikari	Public Affairs	Maharashtra
2004		Gulzar	Arts	Maharashtra
2004		Sardara Singh Johl	Science & Engineering	Punjab
2004		Madhav Vittal Kamath	Literature & Education	Maharashtra
2004		Komal Kothari	Arts	Rajasthan
2004		Thoppil Varghese Antony	Civil service	Tamil Nadu
2004		Yoshiro Mori	Public Affairs	— (Note: Indicates a citizen of Japan)
2004		Gopi Chand Narang	Literature & Education	Delhi
2004		Govindarajan Padmanaban	Science & Engineering	Karnataka
2004		Poornima Arvind Pakvasa	Social Work	Gujarat
2004		Vishnu Prabhakar	Literature & Education	Delhi
2004		N. Rajam	Arts	Uttar Pradesh
2004		Chennamaneni Hanumantha Rao	Literature & Education	Andhra Pradesh
2004		Thiruvengadam Lakshman Sankar	Civil Service	Andhra Pradesh
2004		T. N. Seshagopalan	Arts	Tamil Nadu
2004		Bijoy Nandan Shahi	Medicine	Delhi
2004		Krishna Srinivas	Literature & Education	Tamil Nadu
2004		Alarmel Valli	Arts	Tamil Nadu
2005		Sardar Anjum	Literature & Education	Haryana
2005		Andre Beteille	Literature & Education	Delhi
2005		Chandi Prasad Bhatt	Others	Uttarakhand
2005		Mrinal Datta Chaudhuri	Literature & Education	Delhi
2005		Yash Chopra	Arts	Maharashtra
2005		Manna Dey	Arts	Karnataka
2005		Irfan Habib	Literature & Education	Uttar Pradesh
2005		Yusuf Hamied	Medicine	Maharashtra
2005		Qurratulain Hyder	Literature & Education	Uttar Pradesh
2005		Tarlochan Singh Kler	Medicine	Delhi
2005		Anil Kohli	Medicine	Delhi
2005		Kiran Mazumdar-Shaw	Science & Engineering	Karnataka
2005		Mrinal Miri	Literature & Education	Meghalaya
2005		Hari Mohan	Medicine	Delhi
2005		Brijmohan Lall Munjal	Trade & Industry	Delhi
2005		M. T. Vasudevan Nair	Literature & Education	Kerala
2005		Azim Premji	Trade & Industry	Karnataka
2005		Balraj Puri	Literature & Education	Jammu & Kashmir
2005		Syed Mir Qasim (Note: Syed Mir Qasim died on 14 December 2004, at the age of 83.)#	Public Affairs	Delhi
2005		A. Ramachandran	Arts	Delhi
2005		G. V. Iyer Ramakrishna	Civil Service	Tamil Nadu
2005		V. S. Ramamurthy	Science & Engineering	Delhi
2005		K. I. Varaprasad Reddy	Science & Engineering	Andhra Pradesh
2005		K. Srinath Reddy	Medicine	Delhi
2005		Tumkur Ramaiya Satishchandran	Civil Service	Karnataka
2005		Girish Chandra Saxena	Civil Service	Delhi
2005		Narasimhiah Seshagiri	Science & Engineering	Karnataka
2005		William Mark Tully	Literature & Education	Delhi
2006		Jaiveer Agarwal	Medicine	Tamil Nadu
2006		P. S. Appu	Civil Service	Karnataka
2006		Shashi Bhushan	Public Affairs	Delhi
2006		Ganga Prasad Birla	Social Work	West Bengal
2006		Grigory Bongard-Levin	Literature & Education	—
2006		Lokesh Chandra	Literature & Education	Delhi
2006		Chiranjeevi	Arts	Andhra Pradesh
2006		Dinesh Nandini Dalmia	Literature & Education	Delhi
2006		Tarun Das	Trade & Industry	Haryana
2006		Madhav Gadgil	Science & Engineering	Maharashtra
2006		A. K. Hangal	Arts	Maharashtra
2006		Devaki Jain	Social Work	Karnataka
2006		Kamleshwar	Literature & Education	Haryana
2006		Abdul Halim Jaffer Khan	Arts	Maharashtra
2006		Sabri Khan	Arts	Delhi
2006		Ustad Ghulam Mustafa Khan	Arts	Maharashtra
2006		Shanno Khurana	Arts	Delhi
2006		Gunter Kruger (Note: Gunter Kruger died on 26 February 2005, at the age of 68.)#	Trade & Industry	Maharashtra
2006		P. Leela (Note: P. Leela died on 31 October 2005, at the age of 75.)#	Arts	Tamil Nadu
2006		K. P. P. Nambiar	Science & Engineering	Karnataka
2006		Nandan Nilekani	Science & Engineering	Karnataka
2006		Sai Paranjpye	Arts	Maharashtra
2006		Deepak Parekh	Trade & Industry	Maharashtra
2006		M. V. Pylee	Literature & Education	Kerala
2006		Subramaniam Ramadorai	Trade & Industry	Maharashtra
2006		N. S. Ramaswamy	Social Work	Karnataka
2006		Pavani Parameswara Rao	Public Affairs	Uttar Pradesh
2006		Ramakanta Rath	Literature & Education	Odisha
2006		V. Shanta	Medicine	Tamil Nadu
2006		Hira Lall Sibal	Public Affairs	Chandigarh
2006		Billy Arjan Singh	Others	Uttar Pradesh
2006		Jasjit Singh	Others	Haryana
2006		Vijaypat Singhania	Sports	Maharashtra
2006		K. G. Subramanyan	Arts	Gujarat
2006		K. K. Talwar	Medicine	Chandigarh
2006		Vijay Shankar Vyas	Literature & Education	Rajasthan
2006		Dušan Zbavitel	Literature & Education	— (Note: Indicates a citizen of Czech Republic)
2007		Javed Akhtar	Literature & Education	Maharashtra
2007		Gabriel Chiramel	Literature & Education	Kerala
2007		Ela Gandhi	Public Affairs	— (Note: Indicates a citizen of South Africa)
2007		Saroj Ghose	Science & Engineering	West Bengal
2007		V. Mohini Giri	Social Work	Delhi
2007		Somnath Hore (Note: Somnath Hore died on 1 October 2006, at the age of 85.)#	Arts	West Bengal
2007		Jamshed Jiji Irani	Trade & Industry	Maharashtra
2007		Gurcharan Singh Kalkat	Science & Engineering	Chandigarh
2007		N. Mahalingam	Trade & Industry	Tamil Nadu
2007		Prithipal Singh Maini	Medicine	Delhi
2007		Tyeb Mehta	Arts	Maharashtra
2007		Rajan Misra	Arts	Delhi
2007		Sajan Misra	Arts	Delhi
2007		Sunil Mittal	Trade & Industry	Delhi
2007		Ramankutty Nair	Arts	Kerala
2007		Gopaldas Neeraj	Literature & Education	Uttar Pradesh
2007		Indra Nooyi	Trade & Industry	—
2007		Kavalam Narayana Panicker	Arts	Kerala
2007		Bhikhu Parekh	Literature & Education	—
2007		Syed Mohammad Sharfuddin Quadri	Medicine	West Bengal
2007		Vilayanur S. Ramachandran	Science & Engineering	—
2007		Tapan Raychaudhuri	Literature & Education	—
2007		Syed Haider Raza	Arts	— (Note: Indicates a citizen of France)
2007		Jeffrey Sachs	Literature & Education	—
2007		Chandra Prasad Saikia (Note: Chandra Prasad Saikia died on 9 August 2006, at the age of 80.)#	Literature & Education	Assam
2007		L. Z. Sailo	Literature & Education	Mizoram
2007		Shiv Kumar Sarin	Medicine	Delhi
2007		Shriram Sharma	Medicine	Maharashtra
2007		Manju Sharma	Science & Engineering	Delhi
2007		T. N. Srinivasan	Literature & Education	—
2007		Osamu Suzuki	Trade & Industry	Japan
2007		K. T. Thomas	Public Affairs	Kerala
2008		Mian Bashir Ahmed	Public Affairs	Jammu & Kashmir
2008		Kaushik Basu	Literature & Education	—
2008		Shayama Chona	Literature & Education	Delhi
2008		Jagjit Singh Chopra	Medicine	Chandigarh
2008		Rahim Fahimuddin Dagar	Arts	Delhi
2008		Chandrashekhar Dasgupta	Civil Service	Delhi
2008		Asis Datta	Science & Engineering	Delhi
2008		Meghnad Desai	Public Affairs	—
2008		Padma Desai	Literature & Education	—
2008		Sukh Dev	Science & Engineering	Delhi
2008		Nirmal Kumar Ganguly	Medicine	Delhi
2008		B. N. Goswamy	Literature & Education	Chandigarh
2008		Vasant Gowarikar	Science & Engineering	Maharashtra
2008		Baba Kalyani	Trade & Industry	Maharashtra
2008		K. V. Kamath	Trade & Industry	Maharashtra
2008		Inderjit Kaur	Social Work	Punjab
2008		Ravindra Kelekar	Literature & Education	Goa
2008		Asad Ali Khan	Arts	Delhi
2008		Dominique Lapierre	Social Work	France
2008		D. R. Mehta	Social Work	Rajasthan
2008		Shiv Nadar	Trade & Industry	Tamil Nadu
2008		Suresh Kumar Neotia	Trade & Industry	Delhi
2008		T. K. Oommen	Literature & Education	Haryana
2008		K. Padmanabhaiah	Civil Service	Delhi
2008		Vikram Pandit	Trade & Industry	United States
2008		V. Ramachandran	Civil Service	Kerala
2008		Sushil Kumar Saxena	Arts	Delhi
2008		Amarnath Sehgal (Note: Amarnath Sehgal died on 28 December 2007, at the age of 85.)#	Arts	Delhi
2008		Jasdev Singh	Others	Delhi
2008		Sri Lal Sukla	Literature & Education	Uttar Pradesh
2008		P. Susheela	Arts	Tamil Nadu
2008		S. R. Srinivasa Varadhan	Literature & Education	United States
2008		Yuli Vorontsov (Note: Yuli Vorontsov died on 12 December 2007, at the age of 78.)#	Public Affairs	USSR
2008		Sunita Williams	Others	United States
2008		Ji Xianlin	Literature & Education	China
2009		Isher Judge Ahluwalia	Literature & Education	Delhi
2009		Inderjit Kaur Barthakur	Public Affairs	Meghalaya
2009		Shamshad Begum	Arts	Maharashtra
2009		Abhinav Bindra	Sports	Punjab
2009		Shanta Dhananjayan	Arts	Tamil Nadu
2009		V. P. Dhananjayan	Arts	Tamil Nadu
2009		Ramachandra Guha	Literature & Education	Karnataka
2009		Shekhar Gupta	Literature & Education	Delhi
2009		Khalid Hameed	Medicine	United Kingdom
2009		Minoru Hara	Literature & Education	Japan
2009		Jayakanthan	Literature & Education	Tamil Nadu
2009		Thomas Kailath	Science & Engineering	United States
2009		Sarvagya Singh Katiyar	Science & Engineering	Uttar Pradesh
2009		G. Krishna	Arts	Andhra Pradesh
2009		R. C. Mehta	Arts	Gujarat
2009		A. Sreedhara Menon	Literature & Education	Kerala
2009		S. K. Misra	Civil Service	Haryana
2009		A. M. Naik	Trade & Industry	Maharashtra
2009		Satish Nambiar	Others	Delhi
2009		Kunwar Narayan	Literature & Education	Delhi
2009		Nagnath Naikwadi	Social Work	Maharashtra
2009		Kirit Parikh	Public Affairs	Delhi
2009		Sam Pitroda	Science & Engineering	Delhi
2009		C. K. Prahalad	Literature & Education	United States
2009		Gurdip Singh Randhawa	Science & Engineering	Delhi
2009		Brijendra Kumar Rao	Medicine	Delhi
2009		Bhakta B. Rath	Science & Engineering	United States
2009		C. S. Seshadri	Science & Engineering	Tamil Nadu
2009		V. Ganapati Sthapati	Arts	Tamil Nadu
2009		Devendra Triguna	Medicine	Delhi
2009		Sarojini Varadappan	Social Work	Tamil Nadu

== Explanatory notes ==
Non-citizen recipients

Posthumous recipients
