= Intraocular lens scaffold =

Surgical procedure in ophthalmology

- Other names: Intraocular lens scaffold
- Specialty: Ophthalmology
- [edit on Wikidata]

Intraocular lens scaffold, or IOL scaffold technique, is a surgical procedure in ophthalmology. In cases where the posterior lens capsule is ruptured and the cataract is present, an intraocular lens (IOL) can be inserted under the cataract. The IOL acts as a scaffold, and prevents the cataract pieces from falling to the back of the eye. The cataract can then be safely removed by emulsifying it with ultrasound and aspiration. This technique is called IOL scaffold, and was initiated by Amar Agarwal at Dr. Agarwal's Eye Hospital in Chennai, India.

The technique can be used to support and protect the posterior capsule membrane during a lens swap procedure.

== Definition ==
The lens capsule may be damaged due to trauma, from birth, or by surgery. During cataract surgery, when half or more of the lens remains and the surgeon notices capsule damage; the IOL scaffold technique can be used to capture the lens and prevent further complications. In this technique, the artificial lens or IOL is placed in the sulcus (remaining part of the lens bag) and phacoemulsification surgery using ultrasound is performed over it. Once the entire lens is removed, the IOL is well positioned on the sulcus. As soon as the surgeon notices the capsular tear or sinking nucleus, anterior chamber infusion can be used to stabilize the chamber. Anterior vitrectomy is performed to remove the vitreous body in the pupil and anterior part of eye. Then the IOL (already planned to be placed in the lens bag) is inserted under the nucleus on the remaining capsule bag. The nucleus is positioned on the IOL and the surgery is completed.

== Advantage ==
By this method, the risk of lens fragments falling into the vitreous body or back part of the eye is reduced. The IOL acts as a barrier or scaffold preventing the lens remnants from falling back. Since separation is present in the posterior (vitreous) eye from the anterior (aqueous) part, retinal risks are reduced. Moreover, neither special instruments nor additional training required once this method is learnt.

== History ==
The intraocular lens scaffold technique was introduced by Dr. Amar Agarwal in 2012. He used this technique in a case which had posterior capsular rupture during a phacoemulsification procedure.

== Indications ==
The technique can be used for intraoperative nucleus removal during cataract surgery (phacoemulsification), removal of lens dropped on the retina, Sommering ring removal, intraocular foreign body removal, and IOL explantation.

== Glued scaffold ==
Fig 2 : GLUED IOL SCAFFOLD A- Cataract piece lying inside the eye (creamy white color). The Intraocular lens (IOL) is injected inside the eye. B- Handshake technique done to externalize the haptics of the IOL. C- Handshake technique completed. D- Both haptics of the IOL are externalized. The IOL is under the cataract piece and acts as a scaffold preventing the cataract pieces from falling down. E- The phaco handpiece emulsifies the cataract pieces using ultrasound. The glued IOl is acting as a scaffold so the technique is called glued IOL scaffold F- Cataract pieces removed.

In an eye with total loss of bag where no capsular bag remnant is present, glued IOL scaffold is used. In this a glued IOL is placed behind the cataract pieces. The glued IOL then works as a scaffold and the cataract pieces are removed with the phaco handpiece using ultrasound. Two partial thickness scleral flaps measuring 2.5 to 2.5 mm are made 180 degrees diagonally apart. Infusion is placed by anterior chamber maintainer and sclerotomies are made below the flaps with 20 gauge needle. The IOL is injected below the remaining lens particles and the remaining lens is positioned on the artificial lens or IOL (Fig 2). The haptics of the IOL are brought out under the flaps as in the glued IOL method and tucked into the scleral tunnel made with 26 gauge needle at the entry site. The phacoemulsification procedure is then continued on the IOL and the anterior chamber is formed by the end of the procedure. Scleral flaps and conjunctiva are then closed with fibrin glue.

In the IOL scaffold, the IOL is placed above the iris or above some remnant of the capsule. Otherwise, a glued IOL then acts as a scaffold.

== Soemmering ring ==
Fig 3 : GLUED IOL SCAFFOLD FOR SOMMERING RING A: Two scleral flaps are made diagonally apart.B: IOL injected below the Sommering ring (thick white portion) and IOL haptics externalized similar to glued IOL.C: Sommering ring dislodged and positioned on the IOL. D: Sommering ring removed by phaco handpiece.

The Soemmering ring is the ring-shaped growth of lens cells after surgical removal of cataractous lens in childhood. This is seen as a peripheral ring after pupil dilatation. Patients who undergo artificial lens implantation in an eye that had earlier cataract surgery use this technique to remove the ring remnant. Here the IOL is placed with the glued IOL scaffold method, the Sommering ring is dislodged on the IOL, and is removed (Fig 3).

== Refractive surprise ==
Refractive surprise can happen after IOL implantation; incorrect lens or power is the probable cause for this. In that situation, the IOL is removed and an IOL of correct power is placed. IOL scaffold is used where the new IOL is placed into the lens bag below the old IOL. The new IOL acts as scaffold or barrier and helps as a platform for the removal of the old lens.

== Foreign body removal ==
Fig 4 : IOL SCAFFOLD FOR INTRAOCULAR FOREIGN BODY (IOFB) REMOVAL. A: IOFB retrieved from the posterior part of eye and placed on the iris.B: IOL injected on the remaining lens bag.C: IOFB removed via the corneal wound over the IOL.

External foreign bodies can enter the eye and become lodged on the retina or vitreous. This is often removed through the open method of opening through the sclera (white coat of the eye). While removing intraocular foreign bodies (IOFB), it may drop or slip onto the back of the eye (Fig 4). This will prevent the accidental slippage of IOFB into the eye.

== Outcomes ==
No increased risk of postoperative complications such as endothelial decompensation or post-operative uveitis has been reported. Good visual outcomes are obtained. IOL has been reported to be stable without de-centering in both eyes.
