= Glued intraocular lens =

Surgical treatment for eyes lacking functional lens capsules

Glued IOL
- Case with a Coloboma of the lens. Notice the lens in the center is half moon shaped as the rest of the lens has not developed. In such cases one can remove the entire lens and fix a glued IOL

In ophthalmology, glued intraocular lens or glued IOL is a surgical technique for implantation, with the use of biological glue, of a posterior chamber IOL (intraocular lens) in eyes with deficient or absent posterior capsules. A quick-acting surgical fibrin sealant derived from human blood plasma, with both hemostatic and adhesive properties, is used.

== History ==
In 1997, Maggi and Maggi were the first to report the sutureless scleral fixation of a special IOL. The sutureless intrascleral fixation of a posterior chamber IOL was first described by Gabor Scharioth. This technique was further modified by making scleral flaps and creating scleral pockets for tucking the haptics. The flaps are then reattached to the bed with the help of glue.

On 14 December 2007, the first glued intraocular lens (IOL) surgery was performed, at Dr. Agarwal's Eye Hospital in Chennai, India. This new surgical procedure was invented and performed by Amar Agarwal. Subsequently, the first child on whom a glued IOL surgery was performed was a patient who had a history of injury to her right eye 3 months before, while bursting crackers. She underwent emergency surgery for lens removal due to severe injury to the lens and received a sutured IOL, which was specific for such cases. After 1 month, when the child came for follow up, it was found that there was a decenteration of the IOL. The parents had noted the child's difficulty in performing activities using the right eye. Under general anaesthesia, Agarwal removed the already existing IOL and placed a new IOL using the Glued IOL technique.

== Indication ==
Glued IOL surgery can be done both as a primary and as a secondary procedure in cases where the lens capsule is deficient or absent. As a primary procedure it can be done in all cases of intraoperative posterior capsule rupture. It can also be done in all cases of subluxation or dislocation of the lens, such as in Marfan syndrome, traumatic dislocation of lens, etc. As a secondary procedure it can be done in all the aphakic cases or as a part of an IOL exchange, following an anterior chamber IOL, or subluxated or dislocated IOL.

== Fibrin glue ==
Fibrin glue has been used previously, in various medical specialties, as a hemostatic agent to arrest bleeding, seal tissues, and as an adjunct to wound healing. It is available in a sealed pack that contains freeze-dried human fibrinogen (20 mg/0.5 ml), freeze-dried human thrombin (250 IU/0.5 ml), aprotinin solution (1,500 KIU in 0.5 ml), one ampoule of sterile water, four 21-gauge needles, two 20-gauge blunt application needles, an applicator with two mixing chambers, and one plunger guide.

Preparation of glue: The vials are placed in a water bath which is preheated to 37 degrees for 2 to 3 minutes. 0.5 cc of distilled water is then added to the thrombin vial, and the aprotinin is mixed with fibrinogen. Each component is then placed in a separate syringe with a 26-gauge needle attached.

== Surgical technique ==
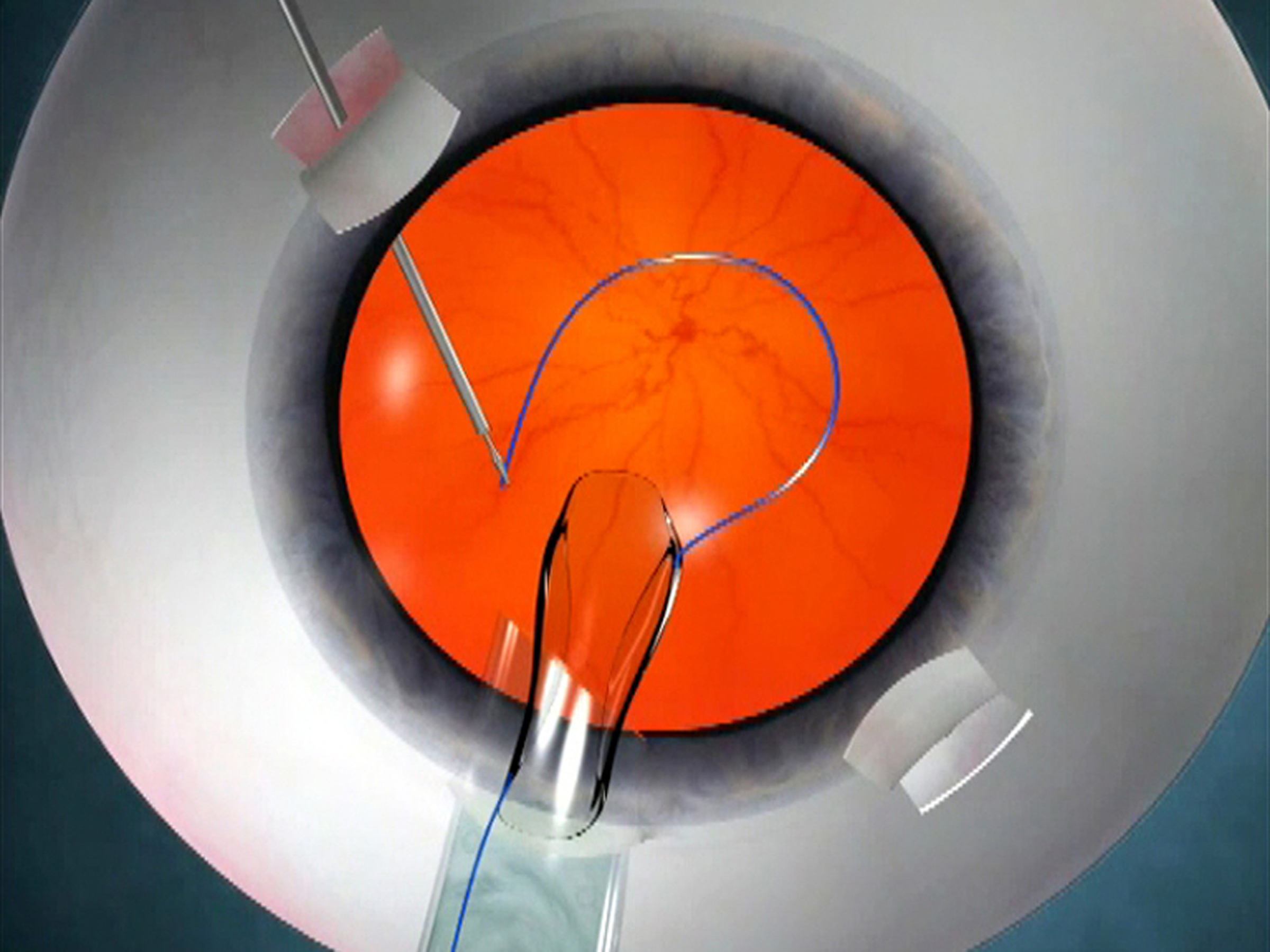
Fig 3: Animation showing glued IOL surgery. Note the flaps made on the white portion of the eye (sclera). The IOL is injected inside the eye and one end (haptic) is grasped with the glued IOL forceps

Fig 4: Glued IOL surgery. The IOL is inside the eye. Both the haptics (blue color) are externalized under the scleral flaps. They will be tucked into scleral pockets and fibrin glue applied to seal them

The glued IOL technique consists of making two partial-thickness, approximately 2.5 mm by 2.5 mm, scleral flaps exactly 180° apart, followed by a sclerotomy with a 20-gauge needle 1 mm from the limbus. A 23-gauge vitrectomy cutter is introduced from the sclerotomy site, and a thorough vitrectomy is done to remove all the vitreous tractions. A corneal tunnel is fashioned, then a 23-gauge glued-IOL forceps is passed through the sclerotomy site, and the tip of the leading haptic of the IOL is grasped, which is then externalized and brought out onto the ocular surface (Fig 3). Similarly the trailing haptic is then externalized using the "handshake technique". Scleral pockets are made at the edge of the flap with a 26-gauge needle just parallel to the sclerotomy site, into which the two haptics are then tucked for additional stability (Fig 4). The scleral flaps are then glued back into place using biological glue. The IOLs that can be used are the three-piece foldable IOLs with slightly firm haptics, or a three-piece non-foldable IOL. The glue is then used to seal the conjunctival closure.

== Vertical glued IOL ==
The concept of performing a "vertical glued IOL" was first suggested by Jeevan Ladi. The vertical corneal diameter is always less than the horizontal diameter. In cases of large eyes, the least corneal diameter (i.e. at 6 o'clock and 9 o'clock) along the vertical axis can be chosen for making the scleral flaps. The IOLs currently available in the market are 13 mm in length. Choosing the least corneal diameter allows for extra length of the haptic available for tucking, and so gives extra stability.

Advantages:

1. Comfortable temporal seating.
2. Vortex veins are not disturbed. So, there is less bleeding.
3. The flaps are hidden beneath the lid margin in the fornices, which gives a better appearance.
4. Extra length of the haptic is available for tucking, which gives more stability to the IOL.

According to some studies by Steven Safran, it is essential to state that the diameter of the ciliary sulcus and the corneal horizontal white-white diameter may not co-relate exactly; and it has been suggested that the surgeon can go ahead with horizontal placement of haptics rather than orienting them vertically.

== Modifications in glued IOL surgery ==
No-Assistant technique – This technique works on the principle of vector forces and was first performed by Priya Narang. In this technique, after the externalization of the leading haptic, the trailing haptic is flexed beyond the pupillary plane, towards the 6 o'clock position. This reverses the direction of vector forces and causes the leading haptic to extrude more from the previous sclerotomy site, thereby preventing haptic slippage and its subsequent complications.

Plugging Silicon Tires of Iris Hooks – This technique was developed by George Beiko and Roger Steinert, wherein the silicon tires of the iris hooks are plugged to the leading haptic, to prevent its accidental slippage. Steven Safran developed the micro-bulldog technique for the same purpose.

Y-Fixation technique – This technique was developed by Ohta Toshihiko, et al., wherein a Y-shaped incision is made, in the sclera, that eliminates the need to make a scleral flap. Mckee Yuri, Francis Price, et al., modified the scleral flap-making by lifting only two edges of the flap and keeping the flap adherent at the point of haptic enclavation.

== Handshake technique ==
Fig 5 : A-A three piece IOL above the rhexis is still subluxated. B-Scleral flaps are made 180 degrees apart. One hand holding the ahptic with the glued IOL forceps while the other is doing vitrectomy. The capsule remnants are removed as they are not needed for the glued IOL. C-Handshake technique being done to catch the tip of the haptic. Notice the trocar cannula on the upper right. One needs fluid in the eye always. An AC maintainer also be used instead. D-One haptic externalized.

Fig 6 : Subluxated three piece IOL glued into place- Part 2. A- Second haptic is caught with the handshake technique. B- Both haptics externalized. C- Both haptics tucked in scleral pocket. D- Air in the AC, Fluid is switched off and glue applied. The air prevents any hypotony.

This technique is used for easy externalisation of haptics (Fig 5 and 6), especially for externalisation of the trailing haptic and in cases of there being small pupil. Two glued IOL forceps are needed for this technique. The haptic is held with one forceps, which is introduced from the corneal tunnel, and the other forceps is introduced from the sclerotomy site. The tip of the haptic is then traced and is caught followed by externalisation from the sclerotomy site. Visualization of the tip of the haptic becomes very difficult in cases of a small pupil. Although iris hooks can be used, the handshake technique simplifies the procedure. The exteriorization of the haptics is a key step in the glued IOL surgery. Since the surgeon is maneuvering with both hands simultaneously, one hand injecting the IOL while the other grasps and exteriorizes the haptics, he/she needs to be familiar with the handshake technique as a means of transferring the haptic from one hand to the other.

If one of the haptics is not caught or if it is released accidentally after being grasped, the situation can be easily resolved using this technique. It utilizes two glued IOL forceps, one of which holds the haptic. Depending on ease of access, the other forceps is introduced through the opposite sclerotomy or through the side-port. The haptic is transferred from the first to the second forceps, such that the first forceps becomes free. It is essential to hold the haptic at its tip before exteriorizing it so that it doesn't snag on the sclerotomy while being brought out. For this reason, this handshake transfer of the haptic between the two glued IOL forceps is continued until the tip of the haptic is caught by the forceps on the side to which the haptic is to be exteriorized. This technique thus allows easy intra-ocular maneuvering of the entire haptic or IOL within a closed globe system.

== Multifocal glued IOL ==
Multifocal IOLs allow for good vision at a range of distances. Monofocal intraocular lenses, which are commonly available, give clear far or near point-of-focus, but are limited to only one focal point. Multifocal intraocular lenses are designed to avoid the need for glasses by providing two or more points of focus.

Multifocal glued IOL procedures have been done with the ReZoom (Abbott Medical Optics), and Tecnis (Advanced Medical Optics (AMO)) IOLs. This makes it possible to offer the accommodative IOL advantage even to patients with an absent capsule. The modified Prolene polyvinylidene fluoride haptic in these IOLs helps them in being more stiff as well as having superior structural memory. Sutured scleral-fixated IOLs in pediatric eyes have been known to lead to problems.

These intraocular lenses are intended to be placed in the capsular bag. Until recently, it was difficult to provide multifocality for patients who had complicated cataract surgeries and who lacked normal capsules. Aphakia with deficient capsule has been a limitation for obtaining multifocality. Now multifocality is possible even in complicated cataract surgeries by the Multifocal Glued IOL procedure, where multifocal IOL implantation can be done even in eyes with large posterior capsular rupture (PCR) and aphakias with deficient posterior capsule.

== Children with glued IOL ==
Good results are reported for multiple complicated pediatric glued IOL situations, such as for homocystinuria with subluxation, aniridia with cataractous subluxated lens, and Weill-Marchesani syndrome with microspherophakia and glaucoma. In dislocated posterior chamber PMMA IOL, the same IOL can be repositioned, thereby reducing the need for further manipulation.

== Aniridia glued IOL ==
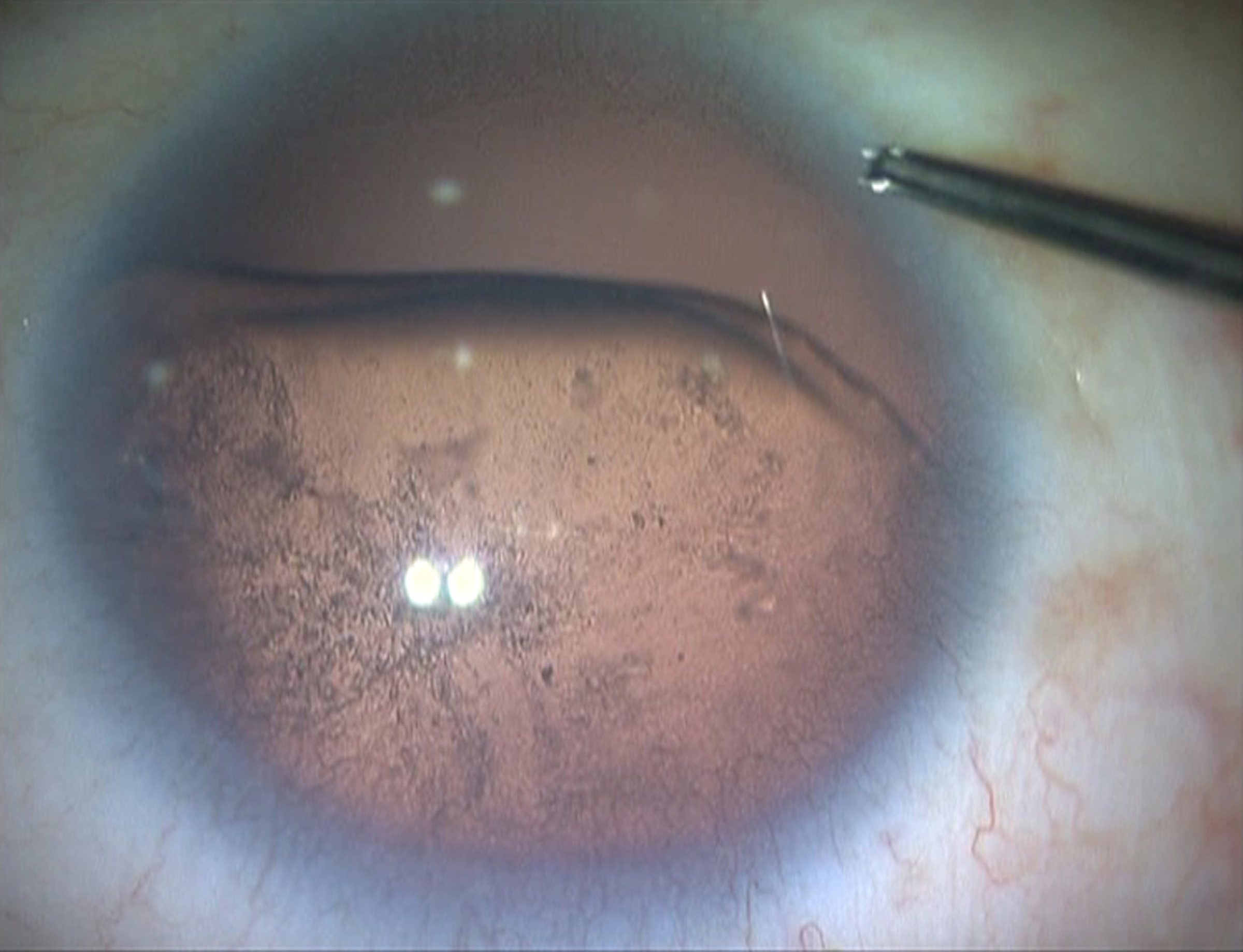
Fig 7A : Case with aniridia (no iris) glaucoma (increased pressure in the eye) and subluxated cataract.

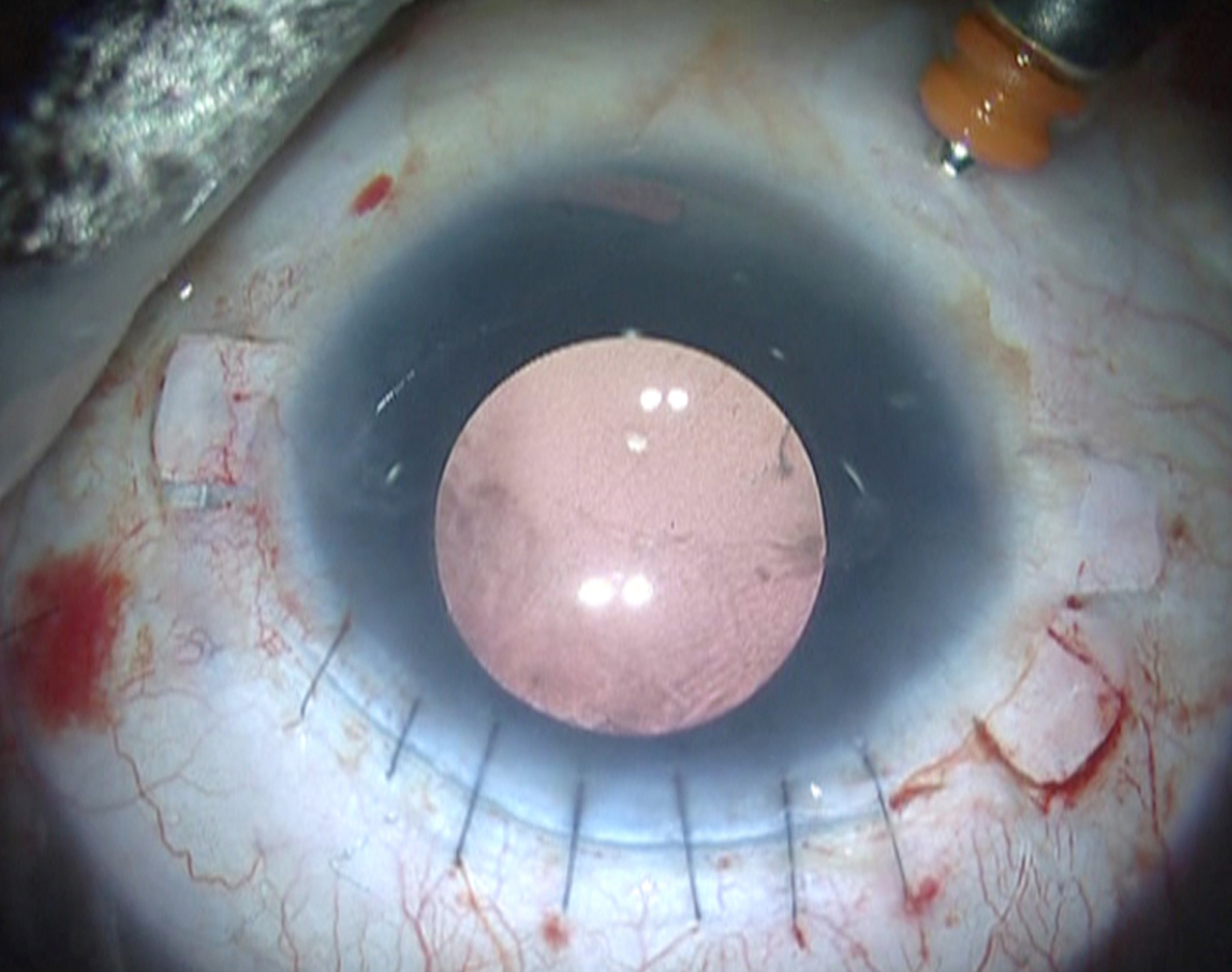
Fig 7B : Cataract removed, anti glaucoma surgery done and an aniridic glued IOL fixed which has artificial iris and IOL.

This glued IOL technique can be used in cases in which there is aphakia with aniridia (Fig 7 A and B). In such cases one can use an aniridia IOL, which has an artificial iris.

== Glued IOL Scaffold ==
This procedure combines two techniques: Glued IOL and IOL Scaffold. In this technique, a glued IOL procedure is initially performed, followed by an IOL Scaffold procedure. This technique is specially effective in cases with deficient posterior capsule support and sulcus or iris support. This technique is also applicable for managing a traumatic subluxated lens and Soemmering ring.

== Pre-Descemet's endothelial keratoplasty with glued IOL ==
Fig 8 : Pre-Descemets Endothelial Keratoplasty – the latest technique of corneal eye transplantation photograph of a patient with corneal haziness due to endothelial damage with lens displaced before surgery (left) and the same patient after 6 months of PDEK with glued IOL surgery (Right). Note the white cornea is becoming clear (right). (Below) Anterior segment optical coherence tomography scan showing good adhesion of the graft on the inner side of cornea.

This is a combination of Pre-Descemet's endothelial keratoplasty (PDEK) and glued IOL (Fig 8). This combined procedure helps to perform two procedures simultaneously, thereby limiting the number of the patient's post-operative hospital visits. PDEK is a kind of endothelial keratoplasty (corneal or eye transplantation), where the Pre-Descemet's layer (PDL), along with Descemet's membrane (DM) and endothelium, is transplanted. The normal cornea has from the front to the back the following layers:

1. Epithelium
2. Bowman's layer
3. Stroma
4. Pre-Descemet's layer
5. Descemet's membrane
6. Endothelium

For the human eye to see, the cornea, the front window of the eye, should be transparent. For that to happen, the inside corneal layer, the endothelium, pumps water from the cornea so that the cornea remains transparent and light can pass into the eye. If the endothelium is bad, the cornea retains a lot of water and becomes damaged, which is called Bullous Keratoplasty. Thus PDEK helps in replacing the non-functional endothelium.

On 4 September 2013, Amar Agarwal, in collaboration with Harminder Dua, performed the first PDEK surgery technique and demonstrated the significance of the Pre-Descemets layer in corneal transplantation. The initial surgery was performed for pseudophakic bullous keratopathy. Though donor eyes of all age groups were used in the initial PDEK cases, there was a marked difference in eyes with young donor corneas, which resulted in better corneal clarity and visual outcome. This paved the way for the difference of PDEK using young donors and the importance of the endothelial viability. Glued IOL can also be performed with various other corneal transplantation / keratoplasty procedures, such as Descemet's membrane endothelial keratoplasty (DMEK), Descemet's stripping endothelial keratoplasty (DSEK), and Penetrating keratoplasty (PK).

This glued IOL technique would be useful in many clinical situations in which scleral-fixated IOLs are indicated, such as luxated IOL, dislocated IOL, zonulopathy, or secondary IOL implantation. In a case with a dislocated posterior chamber, such as PMMA IOL, the same IOL can be repositioned, thereby reducing the need for further manipulation. Externalization of the greater part of the haptics along the curvature stabilizes the axial positioning of the IOL and thereby prevents any IOL tilt.

There is less incidence of uveitis-glaucoma-hyphema syndrome in a fibrin glue–assisted IOL implantation, as compared with a sutured scleral-fixated IOL implantation. In the former, the IOL is well stabilized and stuck onto the scleral bed, and thereby has decreased intraocular mobility; in the latter, there is increased possibility of IOL movement or persistent rub over the ciliary body. Visually significant complications due to late subluxation, which has been known to occur in sutured scleral-fixated IOLs, may also be prevented, as sutures are avoided in this technique. Moreover, the frequent complications of secondary IOL implantation—such as secondary glaucoma, cystoid macular edema, or bullous keratopathy—were not seen in any patients. Another important advantage of this technique is the prevention of suture-related complications, such as suture erosion, suture knot exposure, or dislocation of IOL after suture disintegration or broken suture.

The other advantages of this technique are the rapidity and ease of surgery. The technique eliminates tying the difficult-to-handle 10-0 Prolene suture to the IOL haptic eyelets, the time required to ensure good centration before tying down the knots, and the time required for suturing scleral flaps and closing the conjunctiva, thus significantly reducing total time in surgery. It is also easier and does not require much surgical expertise to use the 25-gauge forceps to grasp and exteriorize the haptic. Fibrin glue takes only 20 seconds to act in the scleral bed, and it helps in adhesion and hemostasis. Fibrin glue has been shown to provide airtight closure, and by the time the fibrin starts degrading, surgical adhesions would have already occurred in the scleral bed.
