= Inderjit Kaur (disambiguation) =

Inderjit Kaur may refer to:

- Inderjit Kaur (born 1942), Indian doctor and social worker.
- Inderjit Kaur Barthakur (born 1934), Indian civil servant.
- Inderjit Kaur Mann (born 1969), Indian politician from Punjab.
- Inderjit Kaur Sandhu (1923-2022), Indian educationist and administrator.
