= Prithipal =

Prithipal may refer to:

- Prithipal Singh Indian field hockey player
- Prithipal Singh Maini Indian orthopedic surgeon
