= Borthakur =

Borthakur or Barthakur is an Indian surname originating from the state of Assam. It refers to the royal Assamese Brahmin priest family. The Borthakur families can be found in Sivasagar, Jorhat, Golaghat, Kamrup, Dibrugarh and many other Districts of Assam. Some were from Kannauj and other were from Benaras.

Notable people of this surname include:

- Rajen Borthakur, politician
- Dipali Borthakur (born 1941), Indian singer
- Inderjit Kaur Barthakur, Indian civil servant, economist and writer
- Parineeta Borthakur, Indian actress and singer
- Plabita Borthakur, Indian actress and singer
- Promod Borthakur, Indian politician
- Ranjit Barthakur, Indian businessman, Executive Chairman of Royal Multisport Pvt. Ltd., the company that owns the Indian Premier League team, Rajasthan Royals.
- Sheela Borthakur, Indian social worker
- Zubeen Borthakur (later known as Zubeen Garg), Indian singer, songwriter, actor
