= Asarwa Chakla =

- Neighbourhood
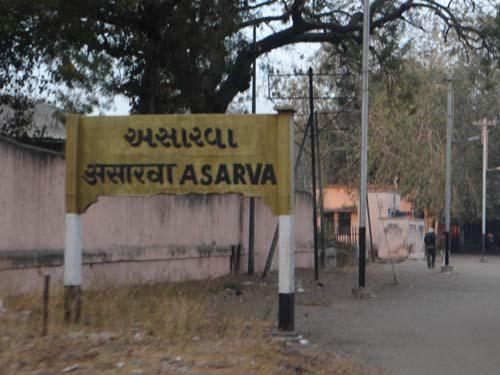

- Location in Ahmedabad Location in Gujarat
- Coordinates: 23°02′36.7″N 72°36′17.6″E
- Country: India
- State: Gujarat
- District: Ahmedabad

Government
  - Body: Ahmedabad Municipal Corporation

Languages
  - Official: Gujarati, Hindi
- Time zone: UTC+5:30 (IST)
- PIN: 380016
- Telephone code: 91-079
- Lok Sabha constituency: Ahmedabad
- Civic agency: Ahmedabad Municipal Corporation

Asarwa Chakla is an area located in Ahmedabad, India. It is located south of the Civil Hospital and east of the Sabarmati river. Chakla literally means "central meeting place" in Gujarati. Asarwa Chakla is a roundabout formed by the north and south Hanuman singh road, Nilkhant Mahadev road, and an unnamed residential road. The Asarwa Chakla post office is located on the south side of Hanuman singh road.
