= Amar Agarwal =

Indian ophthalmologist

- Born: 20 July 1960 (age 66); Chennai
- Citizenship: India
- Education: Madras Medical College, Madras University (M.B.B.S.), Ahmedabad Civil Hospital, Gujarat University (M.S.(Ophtha)), Royal College of Surgeons of Edinburgh (F.R.C.S.), Royal College of Ophthalmologists (F.R.C.Ophth)
- Known for: Research in Ophthalmology
- Awards: Best Doctor Award of the State Government (Tamil Nadu)
- Scientific career
- Fields: Medicine, ophthalmology
- Institutions: Chairman, Dr. Agarwal's Eye Hospital

Amar Agarwal is an Indian ophthalmologist and chairman and managing director of Dr. Agarwal's Eye Hospital and Eye Research Centre in India, which includes 250+ eye hospitals. He is the recipient of the Best Doctor award of the State government from then Chief Minister of Tamil Nadu J Jayalalithaa on 15 August 2014. He is also the past President of the International Society of Refractive Surgery (ISRS) and Secretary General of the Intraocular Implant and Refractive Society of India (IIRSI).

== Early life and education ==
Agarwal was born in Chennai on 20 July 1960 to Padma Bhushan Dr. Jaiveer Agarwal and Dr. Tahira Agarwal. He completed a MB BS degree in February 1983 from Madras Medical College, Madras University. His other qualifications include M.S.(Ophtha) in July 1986 from Ahmedabad Civil Hospital, University of Gujarat, FRCS in October 1986 from the Royal College of Surgeons of Edinburgh, United Kingdom and F.R.C.Ophth in October 1988 from Royal College of Ophthalmologists, London, United Kingdom.

== Career ==
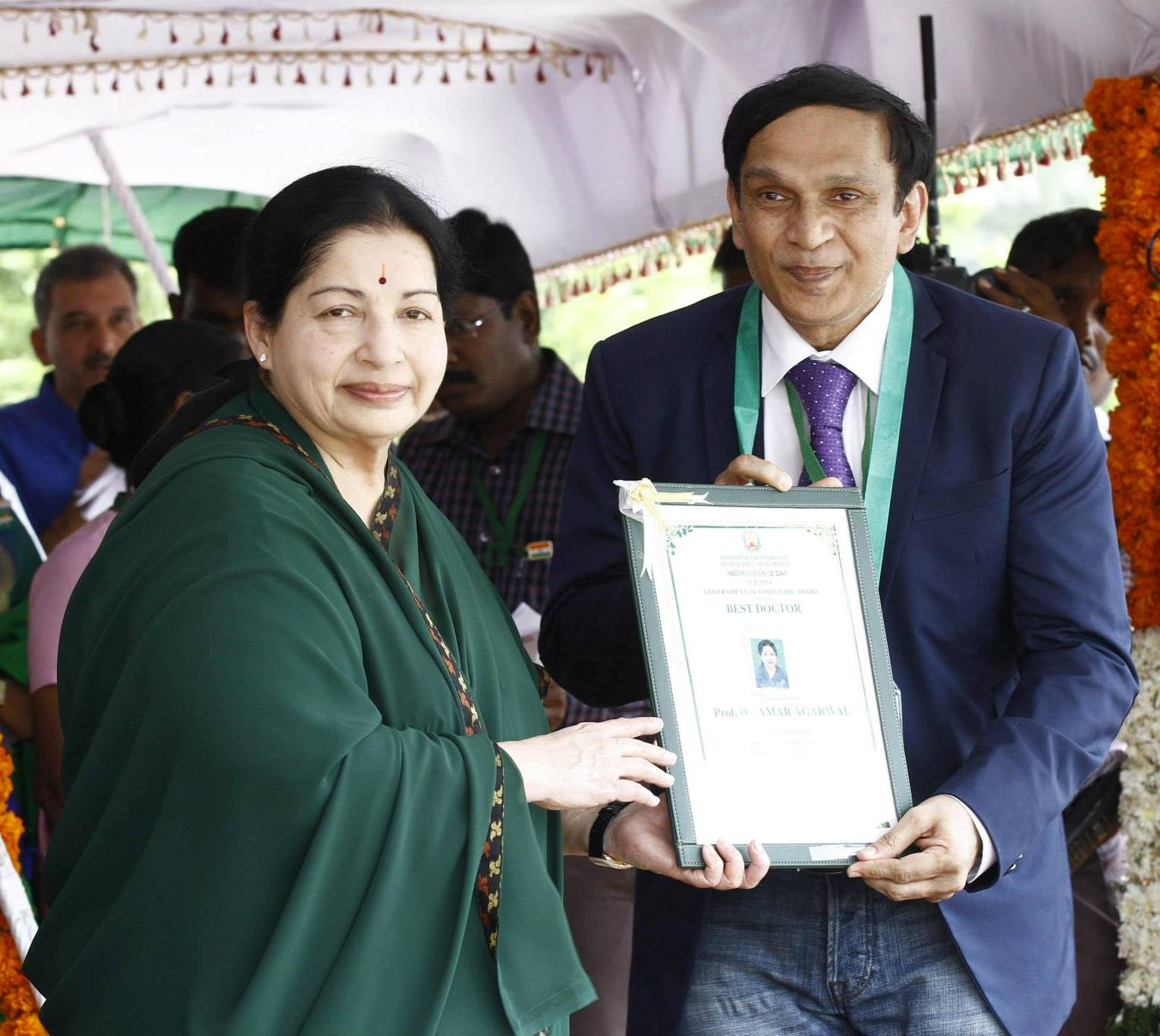
Best Doctor Award

Agarwal is the pioneer of Phakonit which is Phako with Needle Incision Technology. This technique became popularized as Bimanual phaco, Microincision Cataract surgery (MICS) or Microphaco. He is the first to remove cataracts through a 0.7 mm tip with the technique called Microphakonit. He discovered "no anesthesia" cataract surgery and FAVIT a new technique to remove dropped nuclei. The air pump which was a simple idea of using an aquarium fish pump to increase the fluid into the eye in bimanual phaco and co-axial phaco has helped prevent surge. This built the basis of various techniques of forced infusion for small incision cataract surgery. He was also the first to use trypan blue for staining epiretinal membranes and publishing the details in his 4 volume textbook of ophthalmology. He discovered a new refractive error called Aberropia. He was the first to do a combined surgery of microphakonit (700 micron cataract surgery) with a 25 gauge vitrectomy in the same patient thus having the smallest incisions possible for cataract and vitrectomy. He was the first surgeon to implant a new mirror telescopic IOL (LMI) for patients with age related macular degeneration. He was the first in the world to implant a Glued IOL. In this a PC IOL is fixed in an eye without any capsules using fibrin glue. The Malyugin ring for small pupil cataract surgery was also modified by him as the Agarwal modification of the Malyugin ring for miotic pupil cataract surgeries with posterior capsular defects. Dr Agarwal's Eye Hospital was where the first Anterior segment transplantation in a 4 month old child with anterior staphyloma took place. Agarwal reported and operated the first Pre-Descemet's Endothelial Keratoplasty (PDEK), a new type of corneal transplantation that can be used for patients with swelling or edema of the cornea.

== Bibliography ==
=== Books ===
- Agarwal, Amar (1998). Phacoemulsification, Laser cataract surgery and Foldable IOL's- First edition. Chennai: Jaypee, Distributed internationally by Slack and Highlights of Ophthalmology. ISBN 978-8171796243.
- Agarwal, Amar (1999). Refractive Surgery- First edition. Chennai: Jaypee, Distributed internationally by Slack and Highlights of Ophthalmology.
- Agarwal, Amar (2000). Phacoemulsification, Laser cataract surgery and Foldable IOL's- Second edition. Chennai: Jaypee, Distributed internationally by Slack and Highlights of Ophthalmology.

== Awards, Video Awards and Honours ==
Kelman Award

Agarwal has received many awards for his work in ophthalmology including the Barraquer Award and the Kelman Award. His videos have won awards at the film festivals of ASCRS, AAO and ESCRS. He has written more than 50 books which have been published in various languages: English, Spanish and Polish. He trains doctors from all over the world in his center on phaco, bimanual phaco, lasik and retina. He heads the group of Dr. Agarwal's Eye Hospitals which has 67 eye hospitals. He has also been a professor of Ophthalmology at Sri Ramachandra Medical College and Research Institute in Chennai, India.
