= Pingalwara =

Sikh charity

- All India Pingalwara Charitable Society,
- Established: 1924
- Founder: Bhagat Puran Singh
- President: Inderjit Kaur
- Website: www.pingalwara.org

The All India Pingalwara Charitable Society, known as Pingalwara, is a Sikh charitable organization based in Punjab.

== History ==
Pingalwara was founded informally in year 1924 by Ramji Das, 19 years old at the time, who later became known as Bhagat Puran Singh.

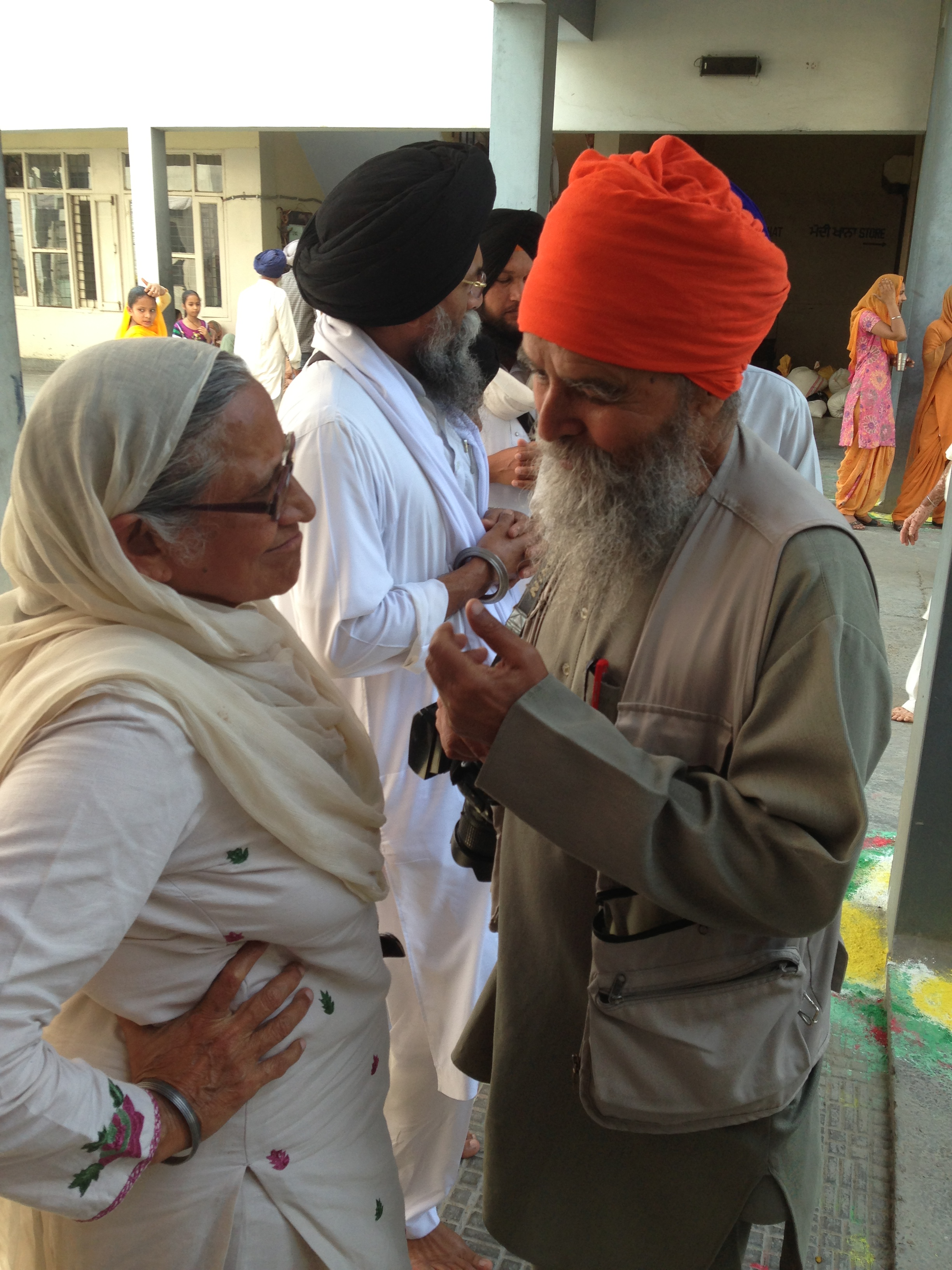
Dr. Inderjit Kaur Pingalwara and Harbhajan Bajwa

Pingalwara is officially registered as the All India Pingalwara Charitable Society under the Act 1960, Reg. No. 130. Following the death of Bhagat Puran Singh in 1992, it has been headed by Inderjit Kaur, a physician by training, who also ran a private maternity clinic in Sangrur, Punjab.

== Services ==
=== Almshouse ===
Pingalwara operates a house for the destitute in Amritsar, in the northern Indian state of Punjab. It is housed in a three-story building near the main Amritsar bus stand on the National Highway No. 1, also known as G.T. Road. The handicapped and diseased are provided shelter and assistance. In addition to this, the organization runs several other facilities that work for towards the same cause. Children, widows and the elderly are able to find support during the most difficult periods of their lives. The rising number of volunteers reflects the strong charitable support within Amritsar.

Currently, Pingalwara has facilities for 1080 patients who are fed, housed and cared for thanks to the support of various philanthropists. The unclaimed bodies of the deceased are donated to the Government Medical College, Amritsar for research and teaching purposes.

The main branch houses the administrative complex, a female ward, children's ward, rehabilitation centre, printing Press, dispensary, medical lab, dental Centre, and the common kitchen.

=== Environmentalism ===
Pingalwara is also involved in environmental efforts.

=== Literature ===
The organization publishes books and some book downloads are available for free on its website.

== See also ==
- Bhagat Puran Singh
