= Eh Janam Tumhare Lekhe =

- Directed by: Harjit singh
- Written by: Tejinder Harjit; Harjeet Singh
- Produced by: All India Pingalwara Charitable Society
- Starring: Pavan Malhotra; Sudhanshu Aggarwal Avrinder Kaur
- Cinematography: Anirudh Garbyal
- Edited by: Parm shiv
- Music by: Gurmoh
- Distributed by: White Hill Studios
- Release date: 30 January 2015
- Running time: 135 minutes
- Country: India
- Language: Punjabi

Eh Janam Tumhare Lekhe (Translation: "This life is dedicated to you (God)") is a Punjabi movie based on the life of Bhagat Puran Singh starring Pavan Malhotra.

== Cast ==
- Pavan Malhotra as Ramjidass/Bhagat Puran Singh
- Sudhanshu Aggarwal
- Arjuna Bhalla
- Avrinder Kaur
- Jasdeep Kaur
- Master Yuvraj
- Jai Bharti
- Gagandeep Singh
- Rohit sawal
- Arvinder Bhatti
- Sukhwinder Virk
- Vikrant Nanda
- Yogesh Suri
- Vinod Mehra
- Raman
- Romi
- Santokh Singh
- Dhanvir Singh Gill
- Rajvinder Pal Singh

== Soundtrack ==
- "Aarti" by Sukhwinder Singh
- "Kanna Manna"
- "Sunn Ve Poorna" by Diljit Dosanjh
- "Lori"
- "Mil Mere Preetam" by Manna Mand
- "Baatta"
