= Abdul Karim Parekh =

Indian social worker and scholar (1928–2007)

- Born: 15 April 1928; Kanseoni, Maharashtra, India
- Died: 11 September 2007 (aged 79); Nagpur, Maharashtra, India
- Occupations: Scholar; Translator; Social worker
- Known for: Social work Translation of Quran
- Spouses: Zubeda; Amina
- Children: 4 sons and 5 daughters
- Parent(s): Abdul Latif; Hanifa
- Awards: Padma Bhushan
- Website: Website

Abdul Karim Parekh (1928–2007), popularly known as Maulana, was an Indian social worker and scholar, known for his translation of Quran into Urdu language and his discourses on the Islamic religious text.

== Life ==
Born on 15 April 1928 at Kanseoni village in the western Indian state of Maharashtra to Abdul Latif and Hanifa as the third of the 13 children born to them, his schooling was only up to primary classes after which he worked as a labour to earn a living. He was known to have been self-taught and translated the Quran into Urdu language which reportedly had 40 re-prints. He was the founder treasurer of the All India Muslim Personal Law Board (AIMPLB) and is a recipient of the Pride of India honour from American Federation of Muslims from India (AFMI). The Government of India awarded him the third highest civilian honour of the Padma Bhushan, in 2001, for his contributions to society. He died on 11 September 2007.

== See also ==
- All India Muslim Personal Law Board
