= Inderjit Kaur =

Indian doctor and social worker (born 1942)

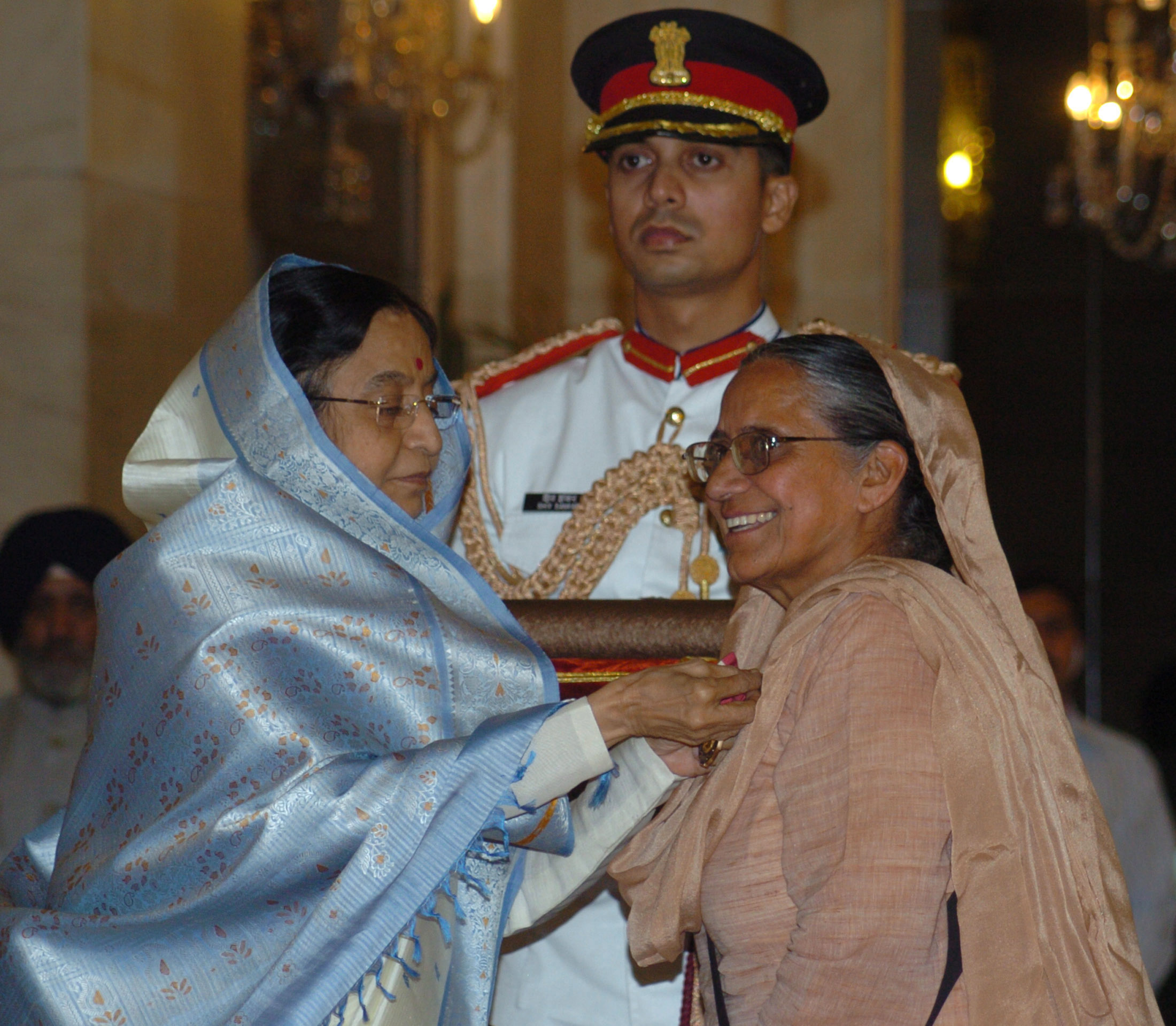
- Kaur receiving the Padma Bhushan award from Pratibha Patil in 2008
- Born: 25 July 1942 (age 83)
- Education: Government Ranbir College, Sangrur; Government Medical College, Patiala
- Awards: Padma Bhushan (2008)

Inderjit Kaur (born 25 July 1942) is an Indian doctor who serves as the president of All-India Pingalwara Charitable Society. She is a 2008 recipient of Padma Bhushan for social work.

== Early life ==
Inderjit Kaur was born on 25 July 1942 to Harbans Singh and Ranjit Kaur. She completed her high school studies in 1957, and then enrolled for an F.Sc Medical course at the Government Ranbir College, Sangrur, which she completed in 1960. From 1960-1965, she pursued Licentiate in Medicine and Surgery, and then joined Government Medical College, Patiala for her MBBS, completed the degree in 1967.

== Career ==
Kaur began serving at a government hospital in Barnala in 1967 with a monthly salary of 700 Indian rupees. She resigned from the government service in 1974, and started working at their own family hospital.

She joined the All-India Pingalwara Charitable Society, a Sikh faith-based institution for human service, in 1986 She subsequently became vice-president a year later., and following the death of Bhagat Puran Singh, she was chosen as the institution's successor.

Kaur serves the Pingalwara society as president. Through Pingalwara, she supports the poor and needy. In 2008, she was awarded with Padma Bhushan for her social work. In 2010, she authored A spiritual way of life.
