= Pre-Descemet's endothelial keratoplasty =

Type of corneal transplant

Pre-Descemet's Endothelial Keratoplasty
- Specialty: Ophthalmology

Pre Descemet's endothelial keratoplasty (PDEK) is a kind of endothelial keratoplasty, where the pre descemet's layer (PDL) along with descemet's membrane (DM) and endothelium is transplanted. Conventionally in a corneal transplantation, doctors use a whole cornea or parts of the five layers of the cornea to perform correction surgeries. In May 2013, Dr Harminder Dua discovered a sixth layer between the stroma and the descemet membrane which was named after him as the Dua's layer. In the PDEK technique, doctors take the innermost two layers of the cornea, along with the Dua's layer and graft it in the patient's eye.

== Definition ==
Fig 1 : Photograph shows the normal layers of the cornea from front to back (Epithelium, Bowman's layer, Stroma, Predescemet's layer, Descemet's membrane and Endothelium).

The normal cornea (Fig 1) has from the front to the back the following layers:

1. Epithelium

2. Bowman's membrane

3. Stroma

4. Pre Descemets layer

5. Descemet's membrane

6. Endothelium

For the human eye to see, the cornea or the front window of the eye should be clear or transparent. For that to happen the inside corneal layer the endothelium pumps out water from the cornea so that the cornea remains transparent and light can pass into the eye and one can see. If the endothelium is bad the cornea starts retaining water and gets damaged which is called bullous keratopathy.Thus PDEK helps in replacing the non functioning endothelium in bullous keratopathy. PDEK is different from the whole cornea transplantation in which the transplantation of entire donor cornea to the recipient is done. Normal corneal thickness is about 520 to 540 microns in the centre and 600 to 620 microns in the periphery. Pre descemet's layer which is dissected in PDEK, measures about 10.15±3.6 microns thick. The descemet membrane (DM) measures about 16±2 microns (range 13-20μ) thick and the normal endothelium is about 5 microns thick. Hence, the overall thickness of the PDEK graft will be about 32 to 44 microns.

== History ==
Prof Amar Agarwal (India) in 2013, September 4 performed the first PDEK surgery technique in collaboration with Prof Harminder Dua (UK) and showed the significance of the Pre Descemets layer in corneal transplantation. The initial surgery was performed for pseudophakic bullous keratopathy. Though donor eyes of all age group were used in the initial PDEK cases; there was marked difference in eyes with young donor corneas which resulted in better corneal clarity and visual outcome. This paved the way for the difference of PDEK using young donors and the importance of the endothelial viability.

== Indications ==
PDEK surgery can be performed in patients with decompensated cornea like pseudophakic bullous keratopathy, aphakic bullous keratopathy, congenital endothelial decompensation like Fuch's dystrophy of cornea and post traumatic endothelial decompensation.

== Donor age ==
PDEK graft can be harvested from donor of any age. Easy dissection of PDL layer in infant (less than 1 year), pediatric (1– 15 years) and young donor (15 –40 years) is an added advantage in PDEK procedure, which helps in transfer of viable endothelial cells with maximum regenerating capacity from this group of donors.

== Recipient age ==
PDEK graft is transplanted so far for adult patients who have lost vision due to endothelial decompensation meaning the Endothelium is not working.

== Surgical technique ==
Graft can be obtained from a dissected corneoscleral button taken from the deceased. The procedure is performed in sterile operating theatre setup. PDEK graft is prepared initially and kept in the storage medium (Optisol or MK medium) till the recipient bed is prepared.

== Graft preparation ==
Fig 2 : Pre-Descemet's endothelial keratoplasty (PDEK). A, B: A 30 gauge needle is introduced into the centre of the cornea and air is injected. A big bubble is formed in the donor cornea on the endothelial side and it is pierced with Knife. C, D: Graft is stained or coloured by Trypan blue dye and dissected out.

The donor corneoscleral rim (donor cornea) is placed on the eye mount with the endothelial side facing the surgeon. A 30 gauge needle attached to a 5 ml syringe filled with sterile air is passed from the limbus (edge of the cornea) into the mid stroma (middle of the corneal layers) with the bevel of the needle facing upwards. Once the needle is stable in the stroma, controlled air injection is performed. Numerous tiny air bubbles are seen cleaving the stroma and finally they coalesce to form one large bubble or Big bubble (BB) (Fig 2A). Once the type 1 BB is formed in the centre, it is gradually enlarged to maximum size which is about 8 mm. Following this, the bubble is pierced with a trephine or knife (Fig 2B) and the graft is dissected meticulously. It is then stained with a dye (trypan blue) and delineated well (Fig 2C, D). The dissected PDEK graft is then placed in a storage medium till the recipient (patient) is ready for transplantation.

== Host bed preparation ==
After obtaining the informed consent from the patient, local anesthesia is given. Anterior chamber entry (eye entry) is made by a blade in the superior corneo-limbus area. Descemet's membrane along with endothelium in the patient is removed mechanically by reverse Sinskey hook by controlled stripping on the endothelial side (Fig 3A-C).

== Graft Injection into host bed ==
Fig 3 : Graft injection into the host bed in combined PDEK with glued IOL. A: A central Big bubble formed in the donor cornea by pushing air into the cornea B, C: Flaps are made in the white sclera, IOL is inserted into the eye and the arms or haptics of the IOL is pulled out of the eye and attached to the white sclera in a tunnel and then glue is applied. The patient's damaged posterior part of cornea (descemet's membrane with endothelium) peeled manually. D: PDEK graft pushed into the eye under saline and opened. Endoilluminator or external light source is used to confirm the orientation of the graft. E, F: Donor graft is attached to the host stroma by air injection below the graft without sutures.

The PDEK graft which is already preserved in the storage medium is then placed in an injector (Fig 3A). The graft takes a shape of scroll immediately after dissection and the surgeons maintains the integrity or orientation of the scroll throughout the procedure. The injector along with the graft is inserted via the corneal wound and the graft is injected in the anterior chamber (Fig 3C). Initially the graft is made sure that it is oriented with endothelium down and PDL against the host stroma. This can be confirmed by using an endoilluminator because in eyes with corneal decompensation, the clarity is usually poor and the visualization of graft is affected under naked eye.8 once the orientation is confirmed, the graft is unfolded under saline (Fig 3D). Then the graft is attached to the overlying host stroma pneumatically (Fig 3E, F). Air fluid pressure is maintained inside the chamber for 60 seconds and then minimal air is released. The wound is closed with 10-0 monofilament suture and subconjunctival antibiotic steroid injection is given.

== Predescemet's Endothelial Keratoplasty with glued Intraocular Lens ==
Normal human lens is placed inside a capsular bag by nature. During trauma, surgery or sometimes by genetic cause the bag is damaged, weak or absent. Under this condition, one cannot place a normal intraocular lens (IOL) in the bag. To overcome this problem, the technique of glued IOL was introduced by Prof Amar Agarwal in 2007, December for lens implantation in eyes with the absent or deficient capsular bag.9,10 Here 2 scleral flaps about 180 degrees apart are made and the IOL is inserted through the corneal incision (Fig 3). After making the sclerotomy below the flaps, the haptics are externalized and tucked in a scleral tunnel at the point of exit. Maggi and Maggi in 1997 were the first to report sutureless scleral fixation of a special IOL. Gabor Scharioth and Pavilidis in 2006 reported the scleral tuck and intrascleral haptic fixation of a posterior chamber Intra ocular lens (PC IOL). Fibrin glue is applied for apposing the flaps and conjunctiva. PDEK can be combined or performed simultaneously with glued IOL implantation in eyes with existing corneal decompensation with aphakia, IOL decenteration or dislocated lens. Sometimes, one may require removal of the existing lens (as in Anterior Chamber IOL) and replacement with the other by this method. So far we have seen good anatomical and functional outcome in combined PDEK with glued IOL (Fig 4).

== Predescemet's Endothelial Keratoplasty in infant donor ==
Fig 4 : Pre Descemets Endothelial Keratoplasty - the latest technique of corneal eye transplantation Photograph of a patient with corneal haziness due to endothelial damage with lens displaced before surgery (left) and the same patient after 6 months of PDEK with glued IOL surgery (Right). Note the white cornea is becoming clear (right). (Below) Anterior segment optical coherence tomography scan showing good adhesion of the graft on the inner side of cornea.

Normal endothelial cell count at birth is about 4000 cells/sq mm. Adult population has a count of about 2500 to 2800 cells/Sq mm and loses around 0.6% cells per year. The cells in infant have potential regenerating capacity unlike the adult cell and this can be utilized for PDEK to obtain excellent functional outcome. Infant donor eyes are eyes of donors less than or equal to 1 year. Infant donors have maximum viable cells which can expand and cover the entire cornea in a decompensated adult cornea. Because type 1 BB is formed easily in young corneas, this is an added advantage in PDEK which can be performed in infant donors. Preliminary results on Infant donor PDEK have been excellent and more research is expected on the functional differences in the young donors.

== Postoperative care ==
Post operatively these patients are given topical steroids and antibiotics for 1 month. Low dose steroids are kept in maintenance for one year. Topical lubricants are prescribed according to the ocular surface changes. Preservative free lubricants are initiated in patients with immediate epithelial changes. Intraocular pressure is monitoring on regular basis to assess the steroid induce glaucoma. Follow up visits are preferred as day 1, day 3, day 7, 2 weeks, 1 month, 3 months and then 6 monthly. Post operative anterior segment optical coherence tomography may be performed for assessing the anatomical success of the technique.

== Advantages ==
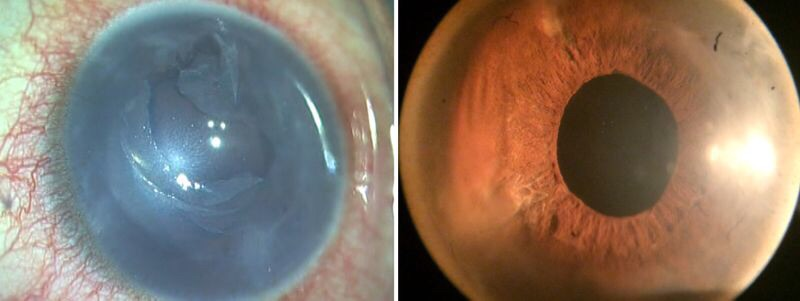
Fig 5 : Pre Descemets Endothelial Keratoplasty in young donor. In this 25 micron from a young or infant donor eye is transplanted into an adult and makes the adult eye see. On the left note the adult eye before Pre Descemets Endothelial Keratoplasty surgery . The eye is white and patient cannot see. On the right is same patient after Pre Descemets Endothelial Keratoplasty surgery using a young donors 25 micron corneal tissue . Note the clear eye and patient can see the last line on the vision testing.

From the patient's point of view, the chances of rejection are less as compared to whole corneal transplantation as the PDEK graft has minimal PDL layer hence.11,12 Early visual rehabilitation is obtained (Fig 5) and the suture related complications are minimized. From the surgeon's point, PDEK graft is thicker than isolated DM graft and hence there is less intraoperative graft handling challenges like torn graft, tissue loss or ragged edges. Pneumatic dissection induced endothelial cell loss is also noted to be not higher than or in fact better than other endothelial keratoplasty.13 Since it is harvested from all age groups, the limitation of donor age is lessened. Minimal interface opacification, less refractive shift and reduced topographic changes are the extra benefits of PDEK.

== Complications ==
Intraoperatively, bubble related problems can happen in early learning curve. This can be managed by proper positioning of needle and controlled intrabubble pressure. Postoperative graft detachment can happen in eyes with insufficient air or loss of air after surgery.1,6 If the graft is detached in the centre and there is significant cornea edema, immediate graft repositioning by air is performed in operating theatre under sterile precautions.

== Postoperative outcomes ==
In the last one and half year, many patients have been benefitted by PDEK surgery.1,6,7 Early visual recovery and less post operative inflammation is the main advantage. Young donor eyes seemed to have made a huge difference in the visual quality and functional outcome. There are additional research studies in progress to elucidate the regenerating capacity of the endothelial cells in vivo.
