= Narayanan Srinivasan =

Indian nuclear scientist

- Born: 11 May 1930; Tamil Nadu, India
- Died: 18 May 2014 (aged 84); Chennai, Tamil Nadu, India
- Occupation: Nuclear scientist
- Known for: Atomic energy program in India
- Awards: 2003 Padma Bhushan; 2009 DAE Lifetime Achievement Award

Narayanan Srinivasan (1930–2014) was an Indian nuclear scientist and the founder project director of Indira Gandhi Centre for Atomic Research (IGCAR). One of the pioneers of atomic energy program in India, he served as the design engineer for the plutonium plant at Trombay, as the project director of IGCAR (the then Reactor Research Centre) at Kalpakkam, as the chief executive of Heavy Water Board and later the Nuclear Fuel Complex, and sat in the Atomic Energy Commission of India from 1982 to 1987. The Government of India awarded him the Padma Bhushan, the third highest civilian award, in 2003. He was also a recipient of the Lifetime Achievement Award of the Department of Atomic Energy which he received in 2009. Srinivasan died on 18 May 2014 in Chennai, at the age of 84.
