= Swadesh Chatterjee =

American activist

- Born: 1947 (age 78–79)
- Occupation: Activist

Swadesh Chatterjee (born 1947) is an American leader and activist dedicated to fostering a better relationship among American and Indian people, politicians and businesses. In recognition of his contributions, the President of India conferred on him the Padma Bhushan award in 2001. He was the first Indian American to receive this award in the public affairs category. Chatterjee was inducted as a member of India's Prime Minister's Global Advisory Council of Overseas Indians in January 2009.

Chatterjee was chairman and co-founder of the U.S.-India Friendship Council, a coalition of prominent Indian American individuals and associations that lobbied U.S. Senators and House members that was instrumental in the passage of the US-India Civilian Nuclear Deal. The historic bill was signed into law by President George W. Bush on Wednesday, October 8, 2008.

In 1998, Chatterjee was elected the President of the Indian American Forum for Political Education (IAFPE), a nationwide organization whose goals are to boost political participation by members of the Indian American Community and to improve the relationship between the United States and India. Under his leadership, IAFPE played a key role in President Clinton’s March 2000 visit to India. He and others from the Indian American community briefed the White House before the visit. He was part of the Indian American delegation that accompanied the president during the visit.

Chatterjee is credited with transforming Senator Jesse Helms, then chairman of the powerful U.S. Senate Foreign Relations Committee, from an India-basher to a friend and an ally. It is believed that this transformation laid the foundation of future successes in improving the U.S.-India relationship.

A long-time North Carolina resident, Chatterjee is a businessman and entrepreneur. He is president and CEO of Swadesh Chatterjee and Associates, and was earlier president of Brandt Instruments. He served on the N.C. Joining our Businesses and Schools (JOBS) Commission under the leadership of Walter Dalton, a former Lieutenant Governor of North Carolina (2009-2013). Chatterjee is a co-founder of TiE Carolinas, a group of successful business people whose primary goal is to develop and assist fledgling entrepreneurs. He served a two-year term (2003-2004) as President of the group.

Chatterjee serves on the board of directors for The Center for International Understanding Council of North Carolina and on the Advisory Board for International and Area studies in the University of North Carolina at Chapel Hill.

Chatterjee was the first recipient of the Community Leader of Year award by the ethnic newspaper, India Abroad (2006).

Chatterjee has a B.Sc.Degree in Physics from Calcutta University, a B.E. in Instrumentation and Electronic Engineering from Jadavpur University, and an M.B.A. from North Carolina State University. He and his wife Manjusri Chatterjee, a practicing Physician, reside in Cary, North Carolina.
