= Soemmering ring =

- Specialty: Ophthalmology

Soemmering ring is an annular swelling of the periphery of the lens capsule. In 1828, Detmar Wilhelm Sömmerring observed posterior capsule opacification and then described Soemmering's ring as deposits of retained equatorial lens epithelial cells which continue to proliferate and form new cortical fibers which eventually form a ring of cortical fibers between the posterior capsule and the edges of the anterior capsule remnant.
