= Pravinchandra Varjivan Gandhi =

Indian businessman (died 2010)

Pravinchandra Varjivan Gandhi (?–2010) was chairman of Dena Bank and a leading newspaper publisher from India. He was awarded the Padma Bhushan in 2002.
