= Bhagat Puran Singh =

Indian writer, environmentalist and philanthropist

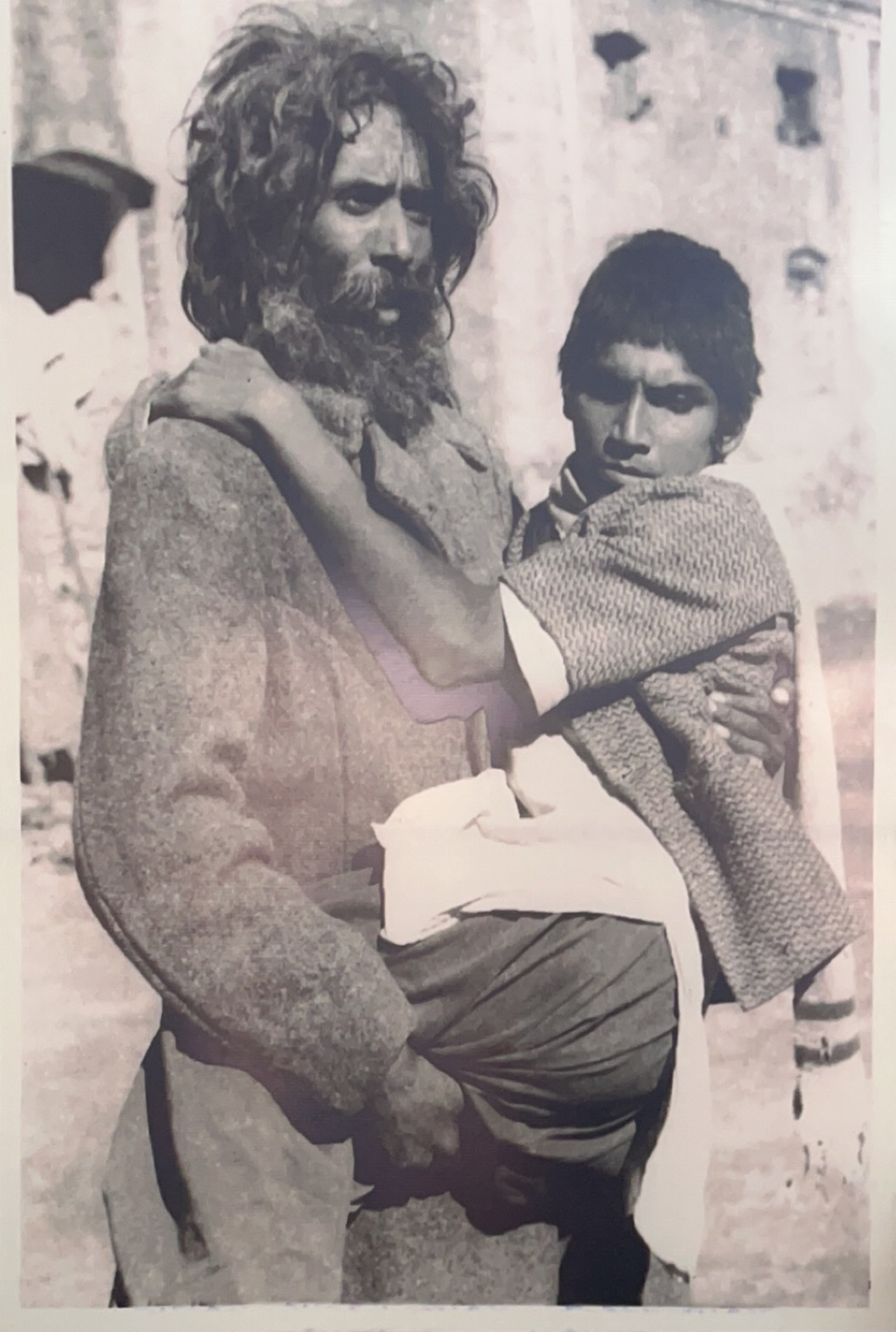
Photograph of Bhagat Puran Singh holding a destitute boy

Bhagat Puran Singh (4 June 1904 – 5 August 1992) was an Indian writer, environmentalist, and philanthropist. As a young man he decided to dedicate his life to humanitarian work, and in 1947, he established Pingalwara, a home for the sick and disabled in Amritsar. He was also an environmental campaigner, raising awareness of pollution and soil erosion and writing many books about environmental topics.

== Early life ==
Bhagat Puran Singh was born in Rajewal (Rohno) Ludhiana district, Punjab. Born into a Hindu family, he was given the name Ramji Das as a child, but later in his early adulthood he adopted sewapanthi sikhi by taking the name Bhagat Puran Singh. After the death of his father, his mother encouraged him to finish the matric level of education, which would allow him to obtain a government job. His mother worked as a domestic help in the house of a doctor at Montgomery (Sahiwal), in part to pay for her son's education. Later, she moved to Lahore, where she cleaned utensils in households, sending ten rupees per month to Puran Singh, who was living in a hostel.

He failed his tenth class and was called back to Lahore to attend a local school. Though uninterested in his school education, he spent much time reading in the Dyal Singh Library.

== Humanitarian work ==
While in Lahore, he began visiting the Gurdwara Dehra Sahib, providing water for visitors to wash before entering, helping manage the Gurdwara's cattle, cleaning, and working in the kitchen.. While working at the Gurdwara, he decided to dedicate himself to humanitarian work. In 1934, Bhagat Puran Singh took into his care a four-year-old child with leprosy who had been left at the door of Gurdwara Dehra Sahib, who he named Piara Singh.

After the partition of India in 1947, Bhagat Puran Singh worked as a medic in a refugee camp in Amritsar, home to over 25,000 refugees.

From 1947 till 1958, Bhagat Puran Singh had no permanent home, but walked the streets collecting donations for the poor. During this time he met Des Raj Bindra, with whom he founded a charitable organisation, the All India Pingalwara Charitable Society. This institution still provides charity care for the poor and handicapped at Tehsilpura, Grand Trunk road, Amritsar.

== Environmentalism ==
Puran Singh also worked for the care of the environment, organising tree planting drives, organised talks and lectures on environment topics, and writing books, such as Education of man, Righteousness alone exalts a nation, Plant or Perish, The Way, and The Increasing Population. He distributed free pamphlets and books about environmental issues through the Pingalwara Society.

== Later life and honours ==
He was honoured in 1981 by the Government of India with the Padma Shri award, given for exceptional and distinguished service in any field. He was among the citizens of India who returned their awards and medals after the Indian army's attack on the Golden Temple in 1984. He was nominated for the Nobel Peace Prize in 1991 for his humanitarian work.

Bhagat Puran Singh died on 5 August 1992 in Amritsar.

== Legacy ==
The Bhagat Puran Singh Chair for Studies in Selfless Service to Humanity was established at Guru Nanak Dev University, Amritsar in 2005.

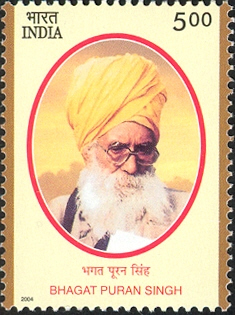
Bhagat Puran Singh on a 2004 stamp of India

Commemorative postage stamps of Bhagat Puran Singh were released by the Ministry of Communications & Information Technology in 2004. The stamp is in the denomination of Rs five.

== Media depictions ==
Bhagat Puran Singh was depicted in the movie Eh Janam Tumhare Lekhe, with Pavan Malhotra in the leading role. The movie was released on 30 January 2015.

== See also ==
- Pingalwara
