= Harbans Singh Wasir =

Indian cardiologist

- Born: 13 August 1937; India
- Died: 23 August 2004 (aged 67); New Delhi
- Resting place: Dayanand Muktidham Cremation Ground and Electric Crematorium; 28°35′21″N 77°14′27″E
- Occupation: Cardiologist
- Years active: 1937–2004
- Known for: Preventive cardiology
- Awards: Padma Bhushan (2000); Padma Shri; Dr. B. C. Roy Award; ICMR Research Award

Harbans Singh Wasir, was an Indian cardiologist, medical researcher and writer, and the professor and head of the Department of Cardiology at the All India Institute of Medical Sciences, New Delhi, known for his contributions in the fields of hypertension and rheumatic heart diseases. He was a recipient of Dr. B. C. Roy Award, the highest Indian award in the medical category. The Government of India awarded him the fourth highest civilian honour of Padma Shri in 1987 and followed it up with the third highest honour of Padma Bhushan in 2000.

== Biography ==
Born on 13 August 1937, Wasir graduated in medicine from the All India Institute of Medical Sciences Delhi and continued his studies there to secure MD in medicine in 1965 and DM in cardiology in 1969. His career started at his alma mater itself where he rose in ranks to become the professor and head of the department of cardiology during his thirty years of service there. After superannuation from service in 1997, he joined Batra Hospital, Delhi and served the institution till his death on 23 August 2004. Wasir served as the honorary physician to four of the Presidents of India and was a Consultant to the World Health Organization on Cardiovascular Diseases. He is credited with research on the topic of preventive cardiology and his research findings have been published by way of several books in English and Hindi, such as Preventive Cardiology, Aging and Heart Care, Heart to Heart — A Holistic Approach to Heart Care, Traditional Wisdom in Heart Care, Life Styles and Longevity and Heart Care for Holistic Health and over 400 medical papers. He also delivered over 350 lectures on cardiology in India and abroad and served as a visiting professor at universities in Sweden, Belgium and Russia. On duty with the World Health Organization, he worked as a consultant at Mauritius, Nepal and Bhutan.

Harbans Singh Wasir was a recipient of Dr. B. C. Roy Award from the Medical Council of India and two civilian awards from the Government of India, the Padma Shri in 1987 and the Padma Bhushan in 2000. He also received the Research Award from the Indian Council for Medical Research and DSc (honoris causa) in Medical Sciences and was an elected fellow of the National Academy of Sciences, India. He was married to Bhupendra Kaur, a gynecologist and the couple had two sons, Harpreet Wasir (Wife- Dr.Kamal Preet Kaur Wasir) and Jasjeet Wasir( Wife - Dr. Vani Wasir), with 3 beautiful grandchildren namely Gitali Wasir, Mehar Wasir and Amanpreet Wasir

.[4] Both the children are medical doctors.[4]

== Selected bibliography ==
- Shyam Sunder Kothari; Sudhir Varma; Harbans Singh Wasir (March 1994). "Thrombolytic therapy in infants and children". American Heart Journal. 127 (3): 651–657. doi:10.1016/0002-8703(94)90676-9. PMID 8122615.
- Harbans Singh Wasir (1995). Traditional Wisdom for Heart Care. Vikas Publishing House. p. 100. ISBN 9780706997392.
- Harbans Singh Wasir (1991). Preventive Cardiology: An Introduction. Vikas Publishing House. p. 409. ISBN 9780706961386.
- H.S. Wasir (1993). Aging and Heart Care. Vikas Publishing House. ISBN 978-0706965674.
- H.S. Wasir (2001). Heart Care for Holistic Health. Roli Books. p. 84. ISBN 9788174361189.
