= Thiruvengadam Lakshman Sankar =

Indian Administrative Service Officer

- Born: Tamil Nadu, India
- Occupations: Energy expert Corporate executive Civil servant
- Known for: Energy
- Awards: Padma Bhushan

Thiruvengadam Lakshman Sankar (1928–2018) was an energy expert, civil servant, corporate executive and the former head of Asian Energy Survey of the Asian Development Bank. He also worked as a former chairman of the Andhra Pradesh Gas Power Corporation Limited and Transmission Corporation of Andhra Pradesh.

Securing his MSc degree in physical chemistry from the University of Madras and MA degree in development economics from Wilson College, he entered the Indian Administrative Service where he held positions such as the Secretary of the Fuel Policy Committee from 1970 to 1975 and the Principal Secretary of the Working Group on Energy Policy from 1978 to 1979. In 2007, he headed a government committee, popularly known as the T. L. Shankar Committee, which proposed ways to reform the Indian coal sector. He was a non-executive chairman of KSK Energy Ventures and a United Nations adviser on Energy to the governments of Sri Lanka, Tanzania, Jamaica, North Korea and Bangladesh.

He was a former board member of Hindustan Petroleum Corporation and a former member of the Integrated Energy Policy Committee of the Planning Commission of India. The Government of India awarded him the third highest civilian honour of the Padma Bhushan in 2004 for his significant contributions to society. He died on 26.12.2018. He had three sons - Ravi, Sachin and Nitin Sanker.

== See also ==
- Asian Development Bank
