= Dr. Agarwal's Eye Hospital =

Indian hospital chain

Dr. Agarwal's Eye Hospital Limited
- Type: Public
- Traded as: BSE: 526783
- ISIN: INE934C01018
- Industry: Healthcare
- Founded: 1957; 69 years ago
- Founders: Jaiveer Agarwal; Tahira Agarwal
- Headquarters: Chennai, Tamil Nadu, India
- Area served: India, Ghana, Kenya, Madagascar, Mauritius, Mozambique, Nigeria, Rwanda, Tanzania, Uganda, Zambia
- Key people: Dr. Amar Agarwal (MD)
- Products: Ophthalmology
- Website: www.dragarwal.com

Dr. Agarwal's Eye Hospital is a chain of eye specialty hospitals in India, headquartered in Chennai. It was founded by Dr. Jaiveer Agarwal and his wife Dr. Tahira Agarwal as an eye care centre in Chennai. It has grown to 180+ centres across India and 15 centres overseas.

Dr. Amar Agarwal is the chairman and managing director of Dr. Agarwal's Eye Hospital.

== Founder ==
Jaiveer Agarwal born on 24 September 1930 along with his family members lead this hospital. He was the founder and chairperson of this hospital and also the recipient of the national award Padma Bhushan from APJ Abdul Kalam in March, 2006. His wife Tahira Agarwal and son Amar Agarwal are both ophthalmologists. Jaiveer Agarwal died on 16 November 2009.

== Centres ==
=== India ===
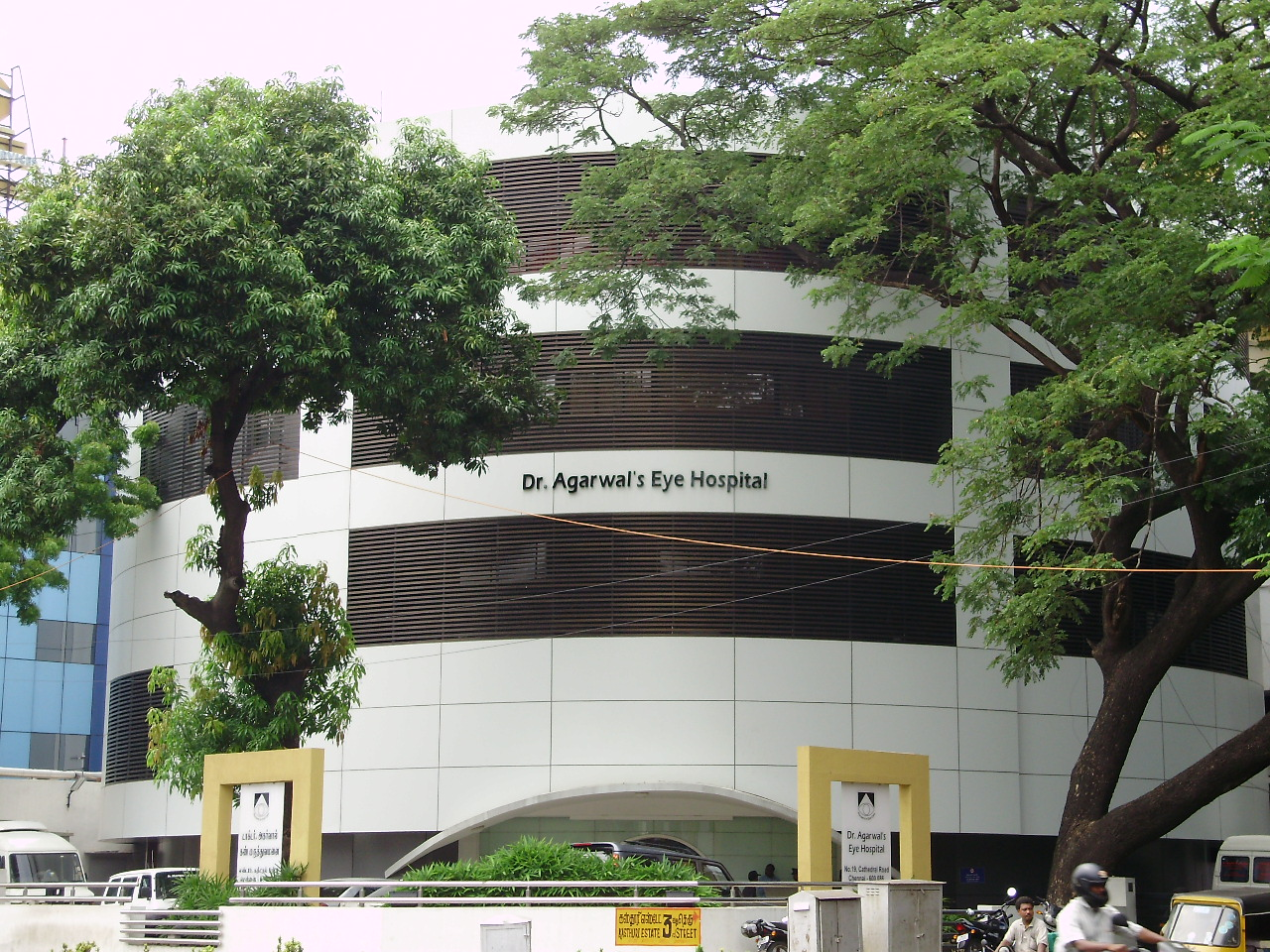
A branch of Dr. Agarwal's Eye Hospital in Chennai.

Dr. Agarwal's Eye Hospital has 167 branches across 17 states in India. Some of the relevant are 18 each in Chennai and 20+ in rest of Tamil Nadu, eleven branches in Bengaluru, 10 branches in Hyderabad (Telangana - Dilsukhnagar, Gachibowli, Himayat Nagar, Madeenaguda, Mehdipatnam, Panjagutta, Santhosh Nagar, Secunderabad, Kukatpally & Uppal), 8 in Andhra Pradesh (Guntur, Nellore, Tirupati, Rajahmundry and Visakhapatnam (Main), one branch each in Jaipur (Rajasthan), Port Blair, Two branches in Kerala (Thiruvananthapuram & Kottayam), two branches in Kolkata, three branches in the rest of Karnataka (Hubli and Mysore), two branches in Odisha (Cuttack and Bhubaneswar), 20 branches in Maharashtra (Pune, Vashi, Tardeo, Chembur and many more), 3 branches in Madhya Pradesh (Palasia, Annapurna, Ashta and 6 branch in Gujarat (Ahmedabad, Bhavnagar, Surat and Vapi).

On 6 November 2019, a new facility is launched at Raja Rajeshwari Nagar, Bengaluru.

On 5 August 2022, it announced the acquisition of five hospitals in Maharashtra.

=== Overseas ===
Dr. Agarwal's Eye Hospital has one branch in Ghana (Accra), one branch in Kenya (Nairobi), one branch in Madagascar (Anatananarivo), three branches in Mauritius (Ebene, Centre De Flacq and Goodlands), two branches in Mozambique (Beira and Maputo), one branch in Nigeria (Kaduna), two branches in Rwanda (Kigali and Rusizi), one branch in Tanzania (Dar Es Salaam), one branch in Uganda (Kampala) and two in Zambia (Kitwe and Lusaka).

== See also ==
- Healthcare in Chennai
