= Prithipal Singh Maini =

Indian orthopedic surgeon

- Born: Punjab, India
- Died: 27 March 2023
- Occupation: Orthopedic surgeon
- Known for: Joint osteotomy
- Spouse: Dr. Balwant Kaur Maini
- Awards: Padma Bhushan(2007); Order of Nishan-e-Khalsa(2001)

Prithipal Singh Maini (died 27 March 2023) was an Indian orthopaedic surgeon and the senior consultant surgeon at Sir Ganga Ram City Hospital, New Delhi. He was also a Consultant Orthopaedist at Sama Hospital, New Delhi.

== Life ==
Maini managed several clinical and medical trials and has taught at a number of medical schools in India. He was an Emeritus Professor of the Maharshi Dayanand University and the vice chairman of Pathfinder Health India Group, an organisation promoting affordable healthcare.

When Parkash Singh Badal, the chief minister of Punjab, suffered a fall in 2001, it was Maini who operated on him to correct the Femur fracture.

He died on 27 March 2023.

== Recognition ==
He received the Order of Nishan-e-Khalsa honor from the chief minister of Punjab in 2001.

The Government of India awarded him the third-highest civilian honour of the Padma Bhushan, in 2007, for his contributions to Indian medicine.
