= Jaiveer Agarwal =

Indian ophthalmologist

- Born: 24 September 1930
- Died: 16 November 2009 (aged 79); Chennai
- Citizenship: India
- Known for: Research in Ophthalmology
- Awards: Padma Bhushan
- Scientific career
- Fields: Medicine & Ophthalmology

Jaiveer Agarwal (1930 – 2009) was an Indian ophthalmologist and founder of Dr. Agarwal's Eye Hospital. He was the recipient of the Padma Bhushan for medicine in March 2006.

== Life ==
Jaiveer Agarwal was born on 24 September 1930 to the Sikh family of Dr. R.S. Agarwal. He married Tahira, who was also an ophthalmologist. The couple went to Madras, where they set up a small clinic. They had a daughter and a son.

The Agarwals screened and operated on thousands of villages and campaigned for eye donations to treat corneal blindness, and correcting refractive errors among schoolchildren.

He died on 16 November 2009.
