= Ahmedabad Civil Hospital =

Hospital in Gujarat, India

- Location in Ahmedabad, Gujarat Ahmedabad Civil Hospital (Gujarat)

Geography
- Location: Asarva, Ahmedabad, Gujarat, India
- Coordinates: 23.051362°N 72.605075°E

Organisation
- Care system: Government
- Type: General

Services
- Emergency department: Yes

History
- Founded: 1841; 185 years ago

Links
- Website: civilhospitalahd.gujarat.gov.in//
- Lists: Hospitals in India

Ahmedabad Civil Hospital, known as the Civil Hospital, is a public hospital located in Ahmedabad, India, with facilities for specialised diagnostic, therapeutic and rehabilitative patient care. The hospital campus spans 110 acres (45 ha) of land and houses the Gujarat Medical Council, Gujarat State Pharmacy Council and Gujarat Nursing Council. It is attached to B. J. Medical College, Ahmedabad.

== History ==
The hospital traces its origins to 1858, when it was founded with the help of donations given by Shri Hutheesing, Shri Premabhai and Surgeon General D Wyllie, for a total cost of 96,000. It had rooms for 92 inpatients.

== Working ==
In 2019, the hospital inaugurated a new 1,200-bed building within the campus, built at a cost of Rs 395 crore. Earlier that month, hundreds of contractual employees of the hospital protested the incomplete payment of salaries.

=== COVID-19 pandemic in Gujarat ===
During the COVID-19 pandemic, the Gujarat High Court highlighted the poor health infrastructure of the hospital, calling conditions in the hospital "pathetic" and "as good as a dungeon", highlighting the lack of ventilators and lack of accountability by senior physicians. After a few days, a new bench of the High Court noted that "administration has geared up and is doing quite well" after observing that the hospital had additional healthcare staff along with 47 ventilators.
