= Inderjit Kaur Barthakur =

Indian civil servant, economist and writer (born 1934)

- Born: 1934 (age 91–92); Meghalaya, India
- Occupations: Civil servant Economist; Writer
- Awards: Padma Shri; Padma Bhushan; Mahila Shiromani Award; International Women Award; Bharat Jyoti Award; Indira Priyadarshini Award

Inderjit Kaur Barthakur is an Indian civil servant, economist and writer.

== Career ==
She is a member of the North Eastern Council (NEC), which carries the rank of a Minister of State of the Union government. She served as a secretary to the Government of India and was the president of the Indian Economics Association in 1990.

She has published several books of poetry, stories and cuisine. So Full So Alive and Stories to Win the World are some of her notable works.

== Awards and honours ==
She is the recipient of awards such as Mahila Shiromani Award (1989), International Women Award (1992), Bharat Jyoti Award (2008) and Indira Priyadarshini Award (2011). The Government of India awarded her the fourth highest civilian honour of the Padma Shri in 1992 and followed it up with the third highest honour of the Padma Bhushan in 2009.
