= 42nd News and Documentary Emmy Awards =

- Date: September 28, 2021 (News Categories); September 29, 2021 (Documentary Categories)
- Location: Virtual

Television/radio coverage
- Network: Watch.TheEmmys.TV

The 42nd News and Documentary Emmy Awards were presented by the National Academy of Television Arts and Sciences (NATAS), to honor the best in American news and documentary programming in 2020. The winners were announced on two ceremonies via live-stream at Watch.TheEmmys.TV and other apps associated, the winners for the News categories were announced on September 28, 2021, while the ones for the Documentary categories were revealed on September 29, 2021.

The nominees were announced on July 27, 2021, with CBS's news magazine 60 Minutes and Vice's news program VICE News Tonight leading the nominations with 16 each while PBS was the most nominated network with 52.

== Winners and nominees ==
The nominations were announced on July 27, 2021.

=== News Programming ===
Outstanding Newscast	Outstanding News Special
VICE News Tonight (Vice); ABC World News Tonight with David Muir (ABC); NBC Nightly News (NBC); Nightline (ABC); The Rachel Maddow Show (MSNBC)	CBS News Special: "Bravery and Hope: 7 Days on the Front Line" (CBS); 20/20: "Juneteenth" (ABC); CNN Special Report: "Witness to the Pandemic" (CNN); Fareed Zakaria Special: "China's Deadly Secret" (CNN); Retro Report: "Enemies of the People: Trump and the Political Press" (Retro Report and VICE TV)
Outstanding Coverage of a Breaking News Story in a Newscast	Outstanding Coverage of a Breaking News Story in a Newsmagazine
VICE News Tonight: "American Uprising" (Vice); Go There: "Coronavirus Outbreak in Wuhan" (CNN); Nightline: "Voices of Conviction" (ABC); Nightline: "Conspiracy in Michigan" (ABC); The Washington Post: "How a Night of Protest Turned Deadly in Kenosha" (The Washington Post)	60 Minutes: "On the Frontline" (CBS); 20/20: "Outbreak: What You Need to Know" (ABC); 20/20: "Kobe Bryant: The Death of a Legend" (ABC); 60 Minutes: "Counting the Vote" (CBS); 60 Minutes: "Inside Jeffrey Epstein's Cell" (CBS)
Outstanding Continuing Coverage of a News Story in a Newscast	Outstanding Continuing Coverage of a News Story in a Newsmagazine
PBS NewsHour: "Desperate Journey" (PBS); Nightline: "Turning Point" (ABC); PBS NewsHour: "Searching for Justice" (PBS); PBS NewsHour: "Inside Venezuela" (PBS); The Situation Room with Wolf Blitzer: "Yemen Hunger Crisis: Made in America" (CNN); The Situation Room with Wolf Blitzer: "CNN Investigates China's Treatment of the Uyghurs in Xinjiang" (CNN); VICE News Tonight: "Death and Denial: COVID in Bolsonaro's Brazil" (Vice)	20/20: "Falling From the Sky" (ABC); 20/20: "Truth and Lies: Jeffrey Epstein" (ABC); 20/20: "American Catastrophe: How Did We Get Here?" (ABC); FRONTLINE: "Taliban Country" (PBS); FRONTLINE in partnership with The Marshall Project & Pulitzer Center: "Undocumented in the Pandemic" (PBS)
Outstanding Short Feature Story in a Newscast	Outstanding Long Feature Story in a Newscast
VICE News: "The Kids Being Trained and Armed to Fight Mexican Cartels" (Vice); CNN Business: "Conspiracy Theorists Said She Started the Coronavirus Pandemic, Now She's Afraid for Her Life" (CNN); CNN Newsroom: "The Body Collectors" (CNN); VICE News Tonight: "Table Stakes" (Vice); VICE News Tonight: "Surviving COVID-19" (Vice)	How the Police Killed Breonna Taylor (The New York Times); A Racist Attack Was Caught on Camera. Nearly 45 Years Later, It Still Stings (The New York Times); Inside One of New York's Deadliest ZIP Codes (The New York Times); The Washington Post: "Murder in Afghanistan, a Trump Pardon, and the Soldiers Left Behind" (The Washington Post); VICE News Tonight: "COVID-19: Italy's Tragedy" (Vice)
Outstanding Investigative Report in a Newscast	Outstanding Investigative Report in a Newsmagazine
AC360: "CNN/Bellingcat Investigation into the Poisoning of Russian Opposition Leader Alexey Navalny" (CNN); CBS Evening News: "Military Sexual Assault: Norah O'Donnell Investigates' (CBS); CBS This Morning: "Toxic Legacy" (CBS); CBS This Morning: "Escaping Justice: U.S. Sex Crime Suspects Using Legal Loophole to Move to Israel" (CBS); The Situation Room with Wolf Blitzer: "Lekki Toll Gate Shooting Investigation" (CNN); VICE News Tonight: "Unreleased Footage Gives an Inside Look at the Night Breonna Taylor Died" (Vice)	FRONTLINE in partnership with The International Consortium of Investigative Journalists: "The Luanda Leaks" (PBS); 48 Hours: "Find Yura: Manhunt on the Dark Web" (CBS); 60 Minutes: "Excited Delirium" (CBS); 60 Minutes: "Opioid Playbook" (CBS)
Outstanding Breaking News Coverage	Outstanding Feature Story in a Newsmagazine
The Death of George Floyd (CNN); MSNBC Live: "Steve Kornacki Reports - Election 2020" (MSNBC); Real America with Jorge Ramos: "Eye of the Hurricane" (Univision); The Coronavirus Outbreak in China (CNN); Trump's Photo-Op at St. John's Church (CNN)	Investigations by VICE: "Disgrace" (Hulu); 60 Minutes: "Talking to the Past" (CBS); Fringe Nation: "Legacy of the KKK" (Vice); FRONTLINE: "Love, Life & the Virus" (PBS); On Assignment with Richard Engel: "Enemy of the State" (MSNBC)
Outstanding News Discussion & Analysis	Outstanding News Analysis: Editorial and Opinion
Fareed Zakaria Special: "How the World Sees America" (CNN); Face the Nation: "US & Iran on the Brink" (CBS); Face the Nation: "Facing the Pandemic" (CBS); The Last Word with Lawrence O'Donnell: "A Discussion with Barack Obama: "A Promised Land"" (MSNBC); This Week with George Stephanopoulos: "Your Voice Your Vote" (ABC)	Heartache in the Hot Zone: The Front Line Against COVID-19 (The New York Times); If I Caught the Coronavirus, Would You Want Me Making Your Next Meal? (The New York Times); How the U.S. Bungled the Plague (The New York Times); How Was My Son Ahmaud Arbery's Murder Not a Hate Crime? (The New York Times); VICE News Tonight: "Black, Pissed, and Patriotic" (Vice)
Outstanding Live Interview	Outstanding Edited Interview
NBC News Specials: Trump Town Hall (NBC); CNN Newsroom: "Anderson Cooper Presses Las Vegas Mayor" (CNN); CNN Newsroom: "Anderson Cooper Grills Mike Lindell of MyPillow" (CNN); CNN Tonight: "Sara Sidner Connects Floyd Family with Minneapolis Police Chief" (CNN); State of the Union: "Dana Bash Presses Secretary of Education Betsy DeVos on School Reopenings" (CNN); The Situation Room with Wolf Blitzer: "Wolf Blitzer interviews Attorney General Bill Barr" (CNN)	HBO Documentary Films: "Axios: President Donald J. Trump--an interview" (HBO); 60 Minutes: "The Republican Ticket" (CBS); ABC News: "Their Painful Bond- Black Mothers Speak Out Together on Their Unimaginable Loss" (ABC); ABC News: "Judge Esther Salas: A Mother's Journey" (ABC); The Rachel Maddow Show: "The Lev Parnas Interview" (MSNBC)
Outstanding Science, Technology or Environmental Coverage	Outstanding Health or Medical Coverage
E-ternal: A Tech Quest to 'Live' Forever (Wall Street Journal); AC360: "Pandemic: How a Virus Changed the World in 1918" (CNN); CNN Special Report: "Bats: The Mystery Behind Covid-19" (CNN); VICE News Tonight: "A Climate for Locusts" (Vice); VICE News Tonight: "Longest Oil Spill" (Vice); Vox Atlas: "Why Scientists Are So Worried About This Glacier" (Vox)	20/20: "The Shot: Race for the Vaccine" (ABC); 60 Minutes: "Short Supply" (CBS); CNN Worldwide COVID-19 Coverage (CNN); PBS NewsHour: "Best Health Care?" (PBS); The Weekly: "My Blood" (FX)
Outstanding Arts, Culture or Entertainment Coverage	Outstanding Business, Consumer or Economic Coverage
World News Tonight with David Muir and Nightline: "The Children of Auschwitz" (ABC); 60 Minutes: "Joaquin Phoenix" (CBS); ABC News Prime: "Diaspora Divide" (ABC); Dominic Fike, at First (The New York Times); Opinion Video: "Cause of Life" (The New York Times); Real Sports with Bryant Gumbel: "Fairway to Freedom: The Story of Valentino Dixon" (HBO)	Rescuing Her Father From an Assisted Living Facility in the Coronavirus Epicenter (ProPublica); 60 Minutes: "Talent on the Spectrum" (CBS); CBS Sunday Morning: "Not So Plain" (CBS); Fault Lines: "Virus on the Poultry Line" (Al Jazeera International USA); New Day: "A Family's Struggle as Pandemic Worsens Food Insecurity" (CNN); VICE Versa: "Between Musk and Mars" (Vice)

=== Spanish Language Programming ===
Outstanding Newscast or News Magazine in Spanish	Outstanding Coverage of a Breaking News Story in Spanish
Noticias Telemundo 11:35 (Telemundo); Aquí y Ahora (Univision); Noticias Telemundo Emergencia Coronavirus Ultima Hora (Telemundo); Noticiero Telemundo (Telemundo); Noticiero Univision (Univision)	Noticiero Telemundo: "La Represión de Trump" (Telemundo); Al Punto: "El país en llamas" (Univision); Crisis del COVID-19 en Ecuador (CNN en Español); Noticiero Telemundo: "Coronavirus: un país en alerta" (Telemundo); Noticiero Univision: "Protestas por George Floyd" (Univision); Primer Impacto: "George Floyd Coverage" (Univision)
Outstanding Investigative Journalism in Spanish	Outstanding Feature Story in Spanish
Aquí y Ahora: "Inundados en Plástico" (Univision); Aquí y Ahora: "Captura y Liberación de un Intocable" (Univision); Aquí y Ahora: "Desaparecidos de la Frontera" (Univision); Docufilms: "Nisman: 5 Años de Preguntas" (CNN en Español); En La Línea: México (Discovery Networks Latin America / US Hispanic)	Op-Docs: "Atencion! Murderer Next Door" (The New York Times); Univision Noticias Digital: "El trauma, el miedo y la desesperanza de quienes esperan su asilo atrapados en México" (Univision); Univision Noticias Digital: "California contra la bandera antiinmigrante de Trump" (Univision); VICE News Tonight: "Heridos, Presos, o Muertos: Las Consecuencias de Protestar en Venezuela" (Vice); VICE News Tonight: "El precio de protestar en Chile" (Vice)
Outstanding Interview in Spanish
Camilo: "Gerardo Gaya: Padre coraje a la mexicana" (CNN en Español); Al Punto: "Entrevista a la Jueza Sonia Sotomayor" (Univision); Conclusiones: "Interview with Venezuelan Opposition Leader Leopoldo López" (CNN); Primer Impacto: "El Hijo de la Madrina Parte 1 y 2" (Univision); Un Nuevo Día: "Entrevista en vivo con el Dr. Fauci (Live interview with Dr. Fauci)" (Telemundo)

=== Documentary Programming ===
Best Documentary	Outstanding Arts and Culture Documentary
POV: "Advocate" (PBS); Athlete A (Netflix); Born to Be (VOD); FRONTLINE: "Once Upon a Time in Iraq" (PBS); Independent Lens: "Belly of the Beast" (PBS); The Trade (Showtime)	Miles Davis: Birth of the Cool (PBS); CNN Films: "Linda Ronstadt: The Sound of My Voice" (CNN); Mucho Mucho Amor: The Legend of Walter Mercado (Netflix); POV: "Our Time Machine" (PBS); The Sit-In: Harry Belafonte Hosts The Tonight Show (Peacock)
Outstanding Current Affairs Documentary	Outstanding Social Issue Documentary
HBO Documentary Films: "Stockton on My Mind" (HBO); Father Soldier Son (Netflix); FRONTLINE: "United States of Conspiracy" (PBS); FRONTLINE: "Inside Italy's COVID War" (PBS); Independent Lens: "Belly of the Beast" (PBS); The Trade (Showtime)	POV: "The Rescue List" (PBS); Independent Lens: "Rewind" (PBS); Not Done: Women Remaking America (PBS); This Ain't Normal (VOD); With Drawn Arms (Starz)
Outstanding Politics and Government Documentary	Outstanding Business and Economic Documentary
Kingdom of Silence (Showtime); POV: "Advocate" (PBS); POV: "Softie" (PBS); The Perfect Weapon (HBO); The Way I See It (MSNBC)	FRONTLINE: "Amazon Empire: The Rise and Reign of Jeff Bezos" (PBS); CNN Films: "Scandalous: The Untold Story of the National Enquirer" (CNN); FRONTLINE in partnership with Financial Times: "Opioids, Inc." (PBS); 31 Days in March: The Month Coronavirus Unraveled American Business (The Wall Street Journal); Trafficked with Mariana van Zeller: "Scams" (National Geographic); VOCES: "Building the American Dream" (PBS)
Outstanding Investigative Documentary	Outstanding Historical Documentary
Athlete A (Netflix); Finding Yingying (Pluto TV); FRONTLINE: "Return From ISIS" (PBS); HBO Documentary Films: "Kill Chain: The Cyber War on America's Elections" (HBO); HBO Documentary Films: "Agents of Chaos" (HBO)	FRONTLINE: "Once Upon a Time in Iraq" (PBS); Challenger: The Final Flight (Netflix); CNN Films: "John Lewis: Good Trouble" (CNN); HBO Documentary Films: "The Art of Political Murder" (HBO); HBO Documentary Films: "Bully. Coward. Victim. The Story of Roy Cohn" (HBO)
Outstanding Science and Technology Documentary	Outstanding Nature Documentary
The Surgeon's Cut (Netflix); Connected: The Hidden Science of Everything (Netflix); Ken Burns Presents The Gene: An Intimate History (PBS); NOVΛ: "Human Nature" (PBS); Pandemic (Netflix); Secrets of the Solar System: "Mars" (CuriosityStream)	The Last Ice (National Geographic); Jade Eyed Leopard (National Geographic Wild); Jane Goodall: The Hope (National Geographic); Nature: "Cuba's Wild Revolution" (PBS); NOVΛ: "Nature's Fear Factor" (PBS)
Outstanding Short Documentary
POV Shorts: "The Love Bugs" (PBS); Church and the Fourth Estate (Field of Vision); FRONTLINE in partnership with The Marshall Project & WORLD Channel: "Tutwiler" (PBS); Op-Docs: "Dying in Your Mother's Arms" (The New York Times); The New Yorker Documentary: "When Humanitarian Aid Is Considered a Crime" (The New York Times & Condé Nast Entertainment)

=== Craft ===
Outstanding Cinematography: Documentary	Outstanding Video Journalism: News
The Trade – Jacopo Campaiola, Pablo Durana, Nicholas Kraus, Ross McDonnell, Max Preiss (Showtime); Epic Animal Migrations: Mexico – Alfredo Barroso, Martin Boege, Chels Briseno, Grant Brokensha, Valentin Cobarrubias, Ricardo Deneke, Nicholas Donelly, Johnny Friday, Liisa Juuti, Luciano Larobina, Daniel Philogene, Emiliano Ruprah, Emiliano Villanueva, Boris Von Schoenebeck (Smithsonian Channel); Hidden Kingdoms of China – Luke Barnett, John Brown, Dondrub Djorge, Shane Moore, Dave Mothershaw, Chris Openshaw, Jacky Poon, Rolf Steinmann (National Geographic); Nature: "Cuba's Wild Revolution" – Domenico Pontillo, John Murray (PBS); The Last Ice – Neil Gelinas, Scott Ressler, Stefan Wiesen, Ron Chapple, Nic Donnelly (National Geographic); The Weekly: "The Sicario" – Victor Tadashi Suarez (FX)	FRONTLINE: "Taliban Country" – Karim Shah, Najibullah Quraishi (PBS); Inside One of New York's Deadliest Zip Codes – Emily Rhyne (The New York Times); On Assignment with Richard Engel: "On Assignment: Age of Hate" – Nico Hameon (MSNBC); The Report by NBC News: "Fighting the Surge" – Ed Ou, Julie Kim, Aaron Sasson (Quibi); VICE News Tonight: "American Uprising" – Ben Bishop, Juanita Ceballos, Roberto Daza, Jika Gonzalez, Dave Mayers, Chris Olson, Jesse Seidman, Daniel Vergara (Vice)
Outstanding Direction: News	Outstanding Direction: Documentary
Election Week in America – Directed by Reza Baktar (CNN); ABC News: "Your Voice Your Vote 2020: The Democratic Debate" – Directed by Jeff Winn (ABC); AC360: "Coronavirus: Facts and Fears Town Hall" – Directed by Daniel Figueroa (CNN); CBS News – Directed by Renee Cullen (CBS); Today – Directed by Jim Gaines (NBC)	The Trade – Directed by Matthew Heineman (Showtime); Born To Be – Directed by Tania Cypriano (VOD); FRONTLINE: "Inside Italy's COVID War" – Directed by Sasha Joelle Achilli (PBS); Independent Lens: "Belly of the Beast" – Directed by Erika Cohn (PBS); Independent Lens: "Rewind" – Directed by Sasha Joseph Neulinger (PBS)
Outstanding Editing: News	Outstanding Editing: Documentary
CBS News Special: "Bravery and Hope: 7 Days on the Front Line" – Diana DeCilio, Seth Fox, Michael McHugh, Michael Vele (CBS); Stressed Election – Aaron Byrd, Meg Felling, Caroline Kim, Ben Laffin, Will Lloyd, Kevin Oliver, Noah Throop, Ainara Tiefenthaler (The New York Times); The Circus: Inside the Craziest Political Campaign on Earth – Barry Blaschke, Michelle Brundige, Charles Divak, Stefanie Maridueña, Jon Miller, Jane Jo, Benji Kast, Evan Wise (Showtime); The Weekly: "My Blood" – Adrienne Haspel (FX); VICE News Tonight: "COVID-19: Italy's Tragedy" – Jose Flores, Ilaria Polsonetti, Alejandro Soto Goico (Vice)	Father Soldier Son – Amy Foote (Netflix); Challenger: The Final Flight – Poppy Das, Adrienne Gits (Netflix); Independent Lens: "Belly of the Beast" – Tchavdar Georgiev, Jean Kawahara (PBS); Independent Lens: "Rewind" – Avela Grenier (PBS); NOVΛ: "Human Nature" – Regina Sobel, Steve Tyler (PBS)
Outstanding Graphic Design and Art Direction: News	Outstanding Graphic Design and Art Direction: Documentary
The 2020 Iowa Brown & Black Presidential Forum – Ana Simões, Kazuyuki Ishii, Kris Cave, Joyce N. Ho, Annie Rosen, Matt Schoen (Vice); HBO Documentary Films: Axios, Season 3 – Eric Chang, Jordan Bruner, Carolyn Figel, Max Strizich (HBO); Nightline: "Turning Point: What America Owes" – Julia Prokhorova, Tanya Sidorenko, Kristofer Rios, Tenzin Shakya, Candace Smith Chekwa (ABC); Univision Noticias Digital: "Potato Slaves" – Patricia Clarembaux, Almudena Toral, Mauricio Rodríguez Pons (Univision); Open Sourced – Dion Lee, Jose Sendaydiego (Vox); Who Gets a Ventilator? – Dominic Smith (The New York Times)	Alien Worlds – Paul Simpson, Simon Wood, Sebastian Read (Netflix); Connected: The Hidden Science of Everything – Daniel de Graaf, Dan Arnklit, Ryan Frost, Chris King, Isaiah King, Igor Latukhin, Naoko Saito, Mike Houston (Netflix); HBO Documentary Films: "Agents of Chaos" – Julie Gratz, Diego Coutinho, Hazel Baird, Aaron Hodgins Davis, Ivo Collins Stoop, Bruno Ferrari, Guilherme Ferreirinha, Rafael Morinaga, Dave Penn, Ben Woodlock, Nick Gibney (HBO); High Score – Christopher Skinner, Joel Plosz, Phil Robibero, Ciara Bresnahan, Christopher Fequiere, Suejee Lee (Netflix); NBC News: "She Wanted a 'Freebirth' With No Doctors. Online Groups Convinced Her It Would Be OK" – Thommas Parrinello, Michael Basilico, James Surdam, Heather Seidel, Andrew Zimbelman (NBC); NOVΛ: "Human Nature" – Ned Piyadarakorn (PBS); The Marshall Project, Sharp As Knives and Topic: "The Zo" – Molly Crabapple (The Marshall Project and Topic)
Outstanding Research: News	Outstanding Research: Documentary
AC360: "CNN/Bellingcat Investigation into the Poisoning of Russian Opposition Leader Alexey Navalny" – Tim Lister, Sebastian Shukla, Darya Tarasova, Clarissa Ward (CNN); 60 Minutes: "Opioid Playbook" – Emilio Almonte, Sam Hornblower (CBS); 60 Minutes: "Hell Flight" – Guy Campanile, Lucy Hatcher (CBS); Axios: "President Donald J. Trump: An Interview" – Jacob Ruszem, Christina Avalos, Juliet Bartz, Ben Feinstein, Tatiyana Jenkins, Beth Morrissey, Jonathan Swan (HBO); The Situation Room with Wolf Blitzer: "Lekki Toll Gate Shooting Investigation" – Barbara Arvanitidis, Stephanie Busari, Gianluca Mezzofiore, Katie Polglase (CNN)	Independent Lens: "Feels Good Man" – Giorgio Angelini, Drew Blatman, Arthur Jones, Katrina Taylor, Caitlin Ward, Aaron Wickenden (PBS); Be Natural: The Untold Story of Alice Guy-Blaché – Pamela B. Green, Joan Simon (Turner Classic Movies); Be Water – Winnie Fu, Jason Heilig, Bao Nguyen (ESPN); CNN Films: "John Lewis: Good Trouble" – Gideon Kennedy, Rich Remsberg (CNN); The Last Ice – Tess Goldhagen (National Geographic)
Outstanding Lighting Direction and Scenic Design	Outstanding Technical Achievement
HBO Documentary Films: "Alabama Snake" – Katie Hickman, Knox White, Britton Foster, Jimi Jones, Nisa Schoonhoven (HBO); America's Hidden Stories: "Hitler's US Election Plot" – Mark Hughes, Hossam Aboul-Magd, Mark Carroll, Thomas Kaufman, Daniel Lyons, Ezra Wolfinger (Smithsonian Channel); CNN Films: "John Lewis: Good Trouble" – Stefan Wiesan (CNN); Election Coverage – Ilya Livshits, Tom Petershack, Margot Silver, Jeff Taylor, Corey Atwood, Tristan James Lead Scenic Designer Emmett Aiello, Marc Greenstein (MSNBC); The News with Shepard Smith – Bruce Ferri, John Casey (CNBC)	AMHQ: Immersive Mixed Reality - Virtual Views (The Weather Channel); 48 Hours (CBS); America's Choice 2020: "CNN Magic Wall" (CNN); Anderson Cooper Full Circle: "ACFC Remote" (CNN); Today – TODAY Technical Team (NBC)
Outstanding Music Composition	Outstanding Sound
Primates – Adam Lukas, Denise Santos (PBS); Being the Queen – Adam Lukas (National Geographic); HBO Documentary Films: "The Soul of America" – Gary Lionelli (HBO); Howard – Alan Menken (Disney+); POV: "The Love Bug" – Mark Crawford (PBS)	Miles Davis: Birth of the Cool – Brian Bracken, Gautam Choudhury, Benny Mouthon (PBS); Great Performances: "Now Hear This: The Schubert Generation" – Reid Mangan (PBS); Jade Eyed Leopard – Beverly Joubert, Charlotte Buys, Jolene Van Antwerp (National Geographic Wild); Micro Monsters with David Attenborough – Elliot Graves, Oliver Kadel (Oculus TV); Nature: "Cuba's Wild Revolution" – Paul Finan, Jon Berman (PBS)
Best Story in a Newscast	Best Story in a Newsmagazine
How the Police Killed Breonna Taylor (The New York Times); AC360: "Idlib: Forced to Flee Again" (CNN); CBS Sunday Morning: "Americans without Water" (CBS); VICE News Tonight: "Armenia and Azerbaijan Return to War" (Vice); VICE News Tonight: "COVID-19: Italy's Tragedy" (Vice)	FRONTLINE: "Love, Life & the Virus" (PBS); 20/20: "America in Pain: What Comes Next?" (ABC); FRONTLINE: "Taliban Country" (PBS); Retro Report: "Enemies of the People: Trump and the Political Press" (Retro Report and VICE TV); The Circus: Inside the Craziest Political Campaign on Earth (Showtime)
Outstanding Writing: News	Outstanding Writing: Documentary
The CBS Evening News with Norah O'Donnell: "ON THE ROAD: Steve Hartman" – Written by Steve Hartman (CBS); 60 Minutes: "Exhume the Truth" – Written by Scott Pelley, Nicole Young (CBS); 60 Minutes: "Life & Death" – Written by Maria Gavrilovic, Scott Pelley (CBS); 60 Minutes: "Putin's Public Enemy" – Written by E. Alexandra Poolos, Lesley Stahl (CBS); Nightline: "Facing Racism" – Written by Steve Osunsami (ABC)	The Story of Plastic – Written by Kyle Cadotte, Tony Hale, Megan Ponder, Deia Schlosberg, Brian Wilson, Stiv Wilson (Discovery Channel); 20/20: "In the Cold Dark Night" – Written by Miikka Leskinen, Stephen Robert Morse, Max Peltz (ABC); FRONTLINE: "Policing the Police 2020" – Written by Anya Bourg, Jelani Cobb, James Jacoby (PBS); FRONTLINE in partnership with Financial Times: "Opioids, Inc." – Written by Thomas Jennings (PBS); Op-Docs: "Hysterical Girl" – Written by Kate Novack (The New York Times)
Outstanding Interactive Media: Current News	Outstanding Interactive Media: Documentary
CNN Digital: "How American Police Gear up to Respond to Protests" (CNN); Inside The Fight to Save Houston's Most Vulnerable (The New York Times); Living in the Unknown AJ Contrast (Al Jazeera Digital); The Washington Post: "Reconstructing Seven Days of Protests in Minneapolis After George Floyd's Death" (The Washington Post); Visual Investigations: Police Misconduct & Racial Injustice in 2020 (The New York Times)	In Event of Moon Disaster (VOD/moondisaster.org); Micro Monsters with David Attenborough (Oculus TV); RT Creative Lab: "Lessons of Auschwitz VR Project" (RT); The Marshall Project, Sharp As Knives and Topic: "The Zo" (The Marshall Project and Topic); Univision Noticias Digital: "Essential but Deportable: Undocumented Immigrants in the Trump Era" (Univision)
Outstanding Interactive Media: Arts, Lifestyle and Culture	Outstanding Promotional Announcement
Disappearing Daughters (The Seattle Times); CGTN America Digital: "U.S. Racial Equality Through the Eyes of an Afro-Latino" (CGTN America); CNN Digital: "From Olympics to Outer Space: The Untold Story of Munich '72" (CNN); The CBS Evening News with Norah O'Donnell: "ON THE ROAD: Kindness 101" (CBS); The New York City of Our Imagination (The New York Times)	Coronavirus Global Town Hall: "Alicia Keys - Good Job" (CNN); CNN Creative Marketing: "Donkey & Elephant Campaign" (CNN); CNN New Year's Eve Live: "2021 Might Not Suck' (CNN); CNN Original Series: "First Ladies Campaign" (CNN); FRONTLINE: "Amazon Empire: The Rise and Reign of Jeff Bezos Trailer" (PBS); Shark Week 2020: "Pickles" (Discovery Channel)

=== Regional News ===
Outstanding Regional News Story: Spot or Breaking News	Outstanding Regional News Story: Investigative Report
Not Again: STEM School Shooting (KMGH-TV – Denver, CO); Channel 3 News at 11: "Tragedy in Dayton" (WKYC-TV – Cleveland, OH); Local 10 News: "Hurricane Dorian: Live from Marsh Harbour" (WPLG-TV – Miami, FL); NewsChannel 5 at 6: "Music City Tornado" (WTVF-TV – Nashville, TN); NewsChannel 5 This Morning: "The Aftermath" (WTVF-TV – Nashville, TN); Two Lives on a Tow Rope (KFOR-TV – Oklahoma City, OK); WCCO 4 News: "Peaceful Protests, Unrest & Arrests" (WCCO-TV – Minneapolis, MN)	The Reveal: "911: Still Lost on the Line - Parkland" (WXIA-TV/11Alive – Atlanta, GA); 10pm News: "Unwarranted" (WBBM-TV – Chicago, IL); ABC15 News: "Unlocked and Unsafe" (KNXV-TV – Phoenix, AZ); NBC5 News: "The Invisibles" (KXAS-TV – Dallas–Fort Worth, TX); WVUE-TV News: "Inspecting the Inspectors" (WVUE-TV – New Orleans, LA)

== Multiple nominations ==
Shows that received multiple nominations
Nominations	Program	Network
16	60 Minutes	CBS
16	VICE News Tonight	Vice
14	FRONTLINE (Note: The official press release lists separately the 14 nominations that FRONTLINE received alone and the 5 other nominations that it received in partnership with projects like The Marshall Project.)	PBS
10	HBO Documentary Films	HBO
9	20/20	ABC
8	Independent Lens	PBS
7	POV	PBS
6	Nightline	ABC
5	AC360	CNN
5	CNN Films	CNN
5	The Situation Room with Wolf Blitzer	CNN
4	NOVΛ	PBS
4	PBS NewsHour	PBS
4	Aquí y Ahora	Univision
4	Univision Noticias Digital	Univision
4	The Trade	Showtime
3	Nature	PBS
3	CNN Newsroom	CNN
3	Op-Docs	The New York Times
3	The Last Ice	National Geographic
3	Noticiero Telemundo	Telemundo
3	The Weekly	FX
2	Miles Davis: Birth of the Cool	PBS
2	CNN Digital	CNN
2	CNN Special Report	CNN
2	Fareed Zakaria Special	CNN
2	48 Hours	CBS
2	CBS News Special	CBS
2	CBS Sunday Morning	CBS
2	CBS This Morning	CBS
2	Face the Nation	CBS
2	The CBS Evening News with Norah O'Donnell	CBS
2	ABC News	ABC
2	How the Police Killed Breonna Taylor	The New York Times
2	"If I Caught the Coronavirus, Would You Want Me Making Your Next Meal?"	The New York Times
2	Al Punto	Univision
2	Noticiero Univision	Univision
2	Primer Impacto	Univision
2	Athlete A	Netflix
2	Challenger: The Final Flight	Netflix
2	Connected: The Hidden Science of Everything	Netflix
2	Father Soldier Son	Netflix
2	On Assignment with Richard Engel	MSNBC
2	The Rachel Maddow Show	MSNBC
2	The Circus: Inside the Craziest Political Campaign on Earth	Showtime
2	Today	NBC
2	Born to Be	VOD
2	Jade Eyed Leopard	National Geographic Wild
2	Micro Monsters with David Attenborough	Oculus TV
2	Retro Report	Retro Report and VICE TV
2	The Marshall Project, Sharp As Knives and Topic: "The Zo"	The Marshall Project and Topic

Nominations by Network
Nominations	Network
52	PBS
41	CNN
30	CBS
22	ABC
20	Vice
19	The New York Times
15	Univision
13	HBO
13	Netflix
8	MSNBC
7	National Geographic
7	Showtime
6	Telemundo
5	NBC
4	VOD
3	CNN en Español
3	FX
3	The Washington Post
2	Discovery Channel
2	National Geographic Wild
2	Oculus TV
2	Retro Report and VICE TV
2	Smithsonian Channel
2	The Marshall Project and Topic
2	Vox
2	The Wall Street Journal
