= Scott Scurlock =

American criminal

William Scott "Hollywood" Scurlock
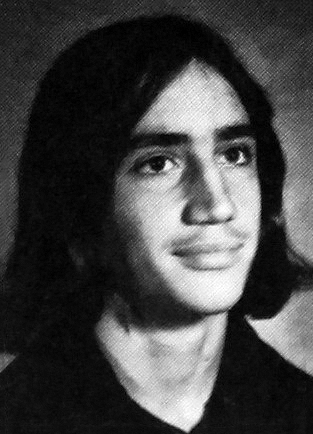
- High school yearbook portrait, 1972
- Born: March 5, 1955; Maryland, U.S.A.
- Died: November 28, 1996 (aged 41); Seattle, Washington, U.S.A.
- Other name: Hollywood Bandit

William Scott Scurlock (March 5, 1955 – November 28, 1996), nicknamed the Hollywood Bandit or simply Hollywood, was an American criminal who robbed banks in the Seattle area during the 1990s, during which he used Hollywood-quality make-up and disguises. He is credited with successfully robbing 19 banks, though one source gives the figure as 18 because he was not involved in the first one. His last attempt ended in a police shootout with Scurlock escaping the scene. His two accomplices were captured and one gave up Scurlock. He killed himself via a gunshot to the head after FBI agents cornered him in a trailer and called out to him to surrender.

== 1970s and 1980s ==
William Scott Scurlock was born in Maryland and grew up in Reston, Virginia, the son of a minister. In 1974, Scurlock moved to Hawaii and reunited with his friend Kevin Meyers, who went to the University of Hawaii on a pole vault scholarship. After Meyers' scholarship ended, the two friends moved to the North Shore of Oahu, where they lived on a five-acre tomato farm. They worked in Honolulu for a company called Hawaii Plant Life and Privacy Fences four days a week and the rest they spent on the North Shore. In 1976, while hiking, Scurlock and Meyers came across a small marijuana farm. They later returned and stole a number of marijuana plants, which Scurlock subsequently sold. Though he had not planned on becoming involved in the drug trade, Scurlock liked having his own marijuana plants hidden on the tomato farm. When the farm's owner found out, Scurlock was kicked off the property, and Meyers moved to Banff National Park in Canada soon thereafter. Scurlock left Hawaii and moved to Olympia, Washington.

In 1978, Scurlock enrolled at Evergreen State College, dreaming of becoming a doctor. He excelled in college, including chemistry classes. As a result, Scurlock began sneaking into the school chemistry lab at night through the ceilings to make methamphetamine, which he subsequently sold. With the money made from dealing, he owned 20 acres (8.1 ha) of secluded land near Olympia that had a small house on it. He used the house for methamphetamine production and built a three-story tree house on the property. Scurlock bragged that he and others built the tree house in two weeks, working day and night "due to being high on meth." But that was not the case, as a later source said that it took them an estimated 3–4 months to build the tree house. The tree house included an extra-large fireplace, outdoor bathtub, and an emergency escape using rope lines to zip through the woods.

Scurlock was popular with friends that he referred to as "his tribe," who would do almost anything for him. Scurlock hired Steve Meyers — Kevin's brother, a successful sculptor who was struggling after a bitter divorce — to come to Washington and do work on his tree house. Meyers transformed it and said that when he arrived, "there was nothing in the house that was conscientiously designed, that's very much what Scott was like." Scurlock had an open and free demeanor, which included living a nudist lifestyle while at the treehouse, and was videotaped often while nude. He traveled extensively, had no shortage of girlfriends, and enjoyed the finest restaurants and champagne. He was known by local waitresses to always leave a $100 tip.

Scurlock was eventually kicked out of school when a professor caught him misusing lab equipment to make meth. He was one credit away from graduating. His meth dealing ended in 1989 when Scurlock's main distributor was murdered. As a result, Scurlock decided that the drug business was too dangerous and quit immediately. When asked by a friend about his (Scurlock's) biggest priority being money, he replied, "No, no. All that does is let you live life a little easier." However, Scurlock needed an income, so he sought another solution.

== Bank robbery ==
According to Steve Meyers, Scurlock had told him that he always had dreams, even as a child, of robbing banks with a "Robin Hood" ethic, kind of like re-appropriating money. It was with this mindset that Scurlock looked up someone he trusted, an old college friend named Mark Biggins. Biggins was having severe financial problems and was trying to support a family. Scurlock had previously hired Biggins to work on his property to help Biggins financially. As a result, when Scurlock asked Biggins to rob banks with him, Biggins felt obligated.

On June 25, 1992, Scurlock and Biggins robbed their first bank. It did not go well. The duo had planned to take a car from someone in the bank as their getaway vehicle, which they did. Biggins did not want to be involved with bank robbery and "quit." However, Scurlock loved the adrenaline rush and continued to rob banks on his own. He asked his friend Steve Meyers to help and offered him $250,000 for one job. Meyers declined knowing it would only corrupt his goal of becoming an artist.

In 1992, Scurlock robbed six banks, leaving few or no clues for the FBI, who subsequently gave him the pseudonym "Hollywood" for the theatrical make-up he wore during the robberies. Scurlock had plenty of banks to choose from, all with plenty of cash due to the burgeoning economy of the Seattle, Washington area, which turned the locale into a money pit.

In 1993, Steve Meyers became a lookout for Scurlock. Meyers monitored a police scanner, and when any 911 calls came in about the robbery, he would call Scurlock out of the bank. The duo used many tricks to throw off police and even paid off bank employees to find out information that would aid them in the robberies. Scurlock convinced Mark Biggins to forget the first bank-robbing debacle and help him and Meyers with the robberies. Biggins became an in-bank lookout watching Scurlock's back. Steve, on 48 Hours, praised Scurlock for his professional approach, saying, "His whole point was if you go in crazy with violence and waving a gun and something does happen, what do you do then? Most people working in banks realize that this guy is not afraid. That is more frightening and commanding without having to be crazy." Meyers also said that they robbed two particular banks three times each. Due to Scurlock's knowledge of police work, police were concerned that it could be a police officer committing the robberies.

By the end of 1995, Scurlock had stolen almost one million dollars. The FBI noticed a pattern and figured that Scurlock needed about $20,000 per month. They were able to determine this by noticing the pattern of his robberies, which seemed to be based around how much money he absconded within any given robbery. With this information, they were able to determine when he would rob the next bank and made an educated guess as to which bank it would be. Their guess on the date of January 25, 1996, wasn't exact but they surveilled a bank that was about two miles away from the actual bank he robbed and did not arrive at the robbery scene in time.

By mid-1996, Scurlock, with Biggins and Meyers, had robbed two more banks, bringing his total to 17 banks robbed in four years. The FBI offered a $50,000 reward for the capture of the unidentified robber, thinking at the time that there was only one person involved. The reward signs showed a sketch of the robber that looked nothing like Scurlock.

His weapon of choice was a Glock 17 Generation 1 9mm pistol which he used in each of the hold-up robberies, and which was the same pistol he shot himself with.

== Death ==
On their final bank robbery attempt, the threesome, emboldened by the reward on Scurlock, planned on robbing three to four banks on the same night. According to Steve Meyers, they even had a "mobile base station set up to white out the police frequencies." But after learning that the police had convinced every bank in Seattle to put electronic tracers in with any stolen money, they scaled back the plans and decided to rob just one bank. On a rainy dark Thanksgiving eve, 1996, at around 5:30 PM, they hit the Seafirst Bank, which they learned was going to have $3–4 million on hand that day. They escaped in one car and changed to a white van to throw off police. They then started digging frantically through the money looking for the electronic tracers.

At the same time, they became stuck in Thanksgiving holiday rush hour traffic. At that point, police say that they spotted a van whose occupants were moving a flashlight back and forth. A group composed of FBI Supervisory Special Agent Ellen Glasser, Seattle Police Detective Mike Magan, Mercer Island Detective Pete Erickson, Seattle Police Officers Tom Mahaffey, Curt Gerry, and Michael Thomas, then surrounded the van, which had stopped on a side street. Police stated that Steve Meyers got out of the van with a rifle and began shooting at them, but Meyers insisted that he never got out of the van, and that police fired on them first. Meyers says that he and Biggins were shot in the arms as a result and were immobilized. Scurlock, who was driving, was the one who got out of the van, intending to fire at the authorities, but his rifle jammed. He then got back in the van and fled. A severely injured Biggins returned 37 rounds at the police. Two hundred police officers eventually responded to the scene. Scurlock jumped out of the van and fired three rounds from a shotgun at police. The van then fled again but crashed into the side of a house. Biggins and Meyers were found in the van with more than $1 million spread out over the floor of the van in addition to weapons, makeup, clothing, which was covered in the two wounded robbers' blood. Scurlock had escaped the scene by jumping out before it fled for the last time. Police searched the area thoroughly but were unable to find Scurlock.

The next day, Thanksgiving, Wilma Walker and her sons, Robert and Ronald Walker, were getting ready for Thanksgiving dinner. At one point, Ronald checked their camper in the back of their house, and according to Wilma, ran back into the house saying, "I saw him, I saw him! He has black curly hair!" They called the police, and five officers — Sgt. Howard Monta, Officers Joe Dittoe, Mike Cruzan, Jim Johnson, Jr, and Sjon Stevens — arrived. After knocking on the camper door and receiving no response, the police sprayed two full canisters of pepper spray into the camper, and after continuing to observe no response, concluded that it was empty. To confirm this, Monta began to look into the camper when they heard a single gunshot. The other officers then returned fire. After four hours passed without any further response, authorities fired more tear gas into the camper before entering it, upon which they found Scurlock dead of a self-inflicted gun wound to the head, which had been the single gunshot that authorities heard when they first attempted to induce Scurlock to exit the camper.

The number of robberies, 18 in total, and the amounts stolen, almost $2.3 million (equivalent to about $5 million today), make Scurlock one of the most prolific bank robbers in the history of the United States. Steven Paul Meyers (born February 22, 1950) and Mark John Biggins (born June 1, 1954), were each sentenced to 21 years' imprisonment. Meyers was released in 2013 and living in New Iberia, Louisiana, while Biggins was released in 2015 and living in Olympia, Washington.

== In popular culture ==
Scurlock’s robberies were covered in an episode of Masterminds and in an episode of The FBI Files.

Netflix released a documentary about Scurlock, How to Rob a Bank, on June 5, 2024. It was directed by Stephen Robert Morse and Seth Porges. Both of Scurlock’s accomplices appear in the film.
