= How to Rob a Bank =

How to Rob a Bank may refer to:

- How to Rob a Bank (2007 film), a 2007 American crime comedy film
- How to Rob a Bank (2024 film), a 2024 American documentary film
- How to Rob a Bank (2026 film), a 2026 American heist film
