= EuroTrump =

2017 documentary film

- Film poster
- Directed by: Stephen Robert Morse; Nick Hampson
- Written by: Stephen Robert Morse; Maria Springer
- Produced by: Stephen Robert Morse
- Music by: Harry Davidson
- Release dates: November 10, 2017 (DOC NYC); June 2018 (Hulu)
- Running time: 90 minutes

EuroTrump is a 90-minute documentary film, which follows Geert Wilders's campaign for Prime Minister of the Netherlands during the 2017 Dutch general election and compares him to US President Donald Trump. It was directed by Stephen Robert Morse and Nick Hampson; it was co-written by Morse and Maria Springer.

== Background and production ==
Geert Wilders, politician in the Netherlands classified as right-wing to far-right, decided to run for Prime Minister of the Netherlands in the 2017 Dutch general election. Stephen Robert Morse was fascinated by this, particularly after American politician Donald Trump's successful presidential election and the United Kingdom leaving the European Union. He, along with Nick Hampson and Maria Springer, decided to make a documentary which follows Wilders campaign, and compares him to Donald Trump. "Wilders' was the first big election in the world after Trump, which is what drew us to the project in the first place. We wanted to make a movie about an election that involved an outsider," Hampson said. Stephen Robert Morse and Nick Hampson co-directed the documentary; Maria Springer co-wrote it. The soundtrack was composed by Harry Davidson, a music scholar from the University of Oxford.

The filming began in December 2016, a couple of days after a trial where Wilders was convicted of hate speech, which concluded with the judge, Hendrik Steenhuis, deciding that the court would not impose any punishment on Wilders following the trial. The makers of the documentary wanted to learn the details of Wilders' viewpoint and engage it, despite disagreeing with his ideas. The Dutch press were not supportive of the documentary; however, Morse stated, "I think that’s an ignorant approach. You should try understand the people who disagree with. If you don't have an in-depth understanding of someone it makes it very challenging to understand their viewpoint, if you don't understand where those views came from." Morse stated that throughout the whole production time span, the production team applied the lessons they learned at the Saïd Business School. Morse thought that even though Wilders had such strong beliefs politically, he was a likeable person; at their first meeting for the documentary, Wilders and Morse made each other laugh often, despite Morse expecting Wilders to be "a monster."

The documentary follows Wilders' campaign and provides an up-close view of him, discussing what his ideas are politically, including clearing Islam from the Netherlands and shutting down all mosques, as well as providing information about himself, such as talking about his two cats and describing himself as a "spoilt child." The documentary also discusses how Wilders constantly has strict security around him, and how it affects him. Morse describes the comparison between Wilders and Trump as ironic, due to how little they have in common. Morse thought that his work producing Amanda Knox allowed Wilders to trust him more; many journalists would have a much more difficult time getting up-close to Wilders. The film premiered at DOC NYC in November 2017 and on Hulu in the US in June 2018.
