= Born to Be =

Born to Be may refer to:

- Born to Be (TV series), a documentary television series that aired on the Canadian music station MuchMusic
- Born to Be (Melanie album), 1968
- Born to Be (EP), 2024 EP by Itsy
- Born to Be (film), a 2019 documentary film
- "Startin'/Born to Be...", a single by Ayumi Hamasaki
