= Oceanside High School (New York) =

School in Oceanside, New York, United States

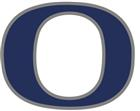

Location
- 1 stanton place Oceanside, Nassau, New York 11572; United States; 40°38′12.66″N 73°37′46.71″W

Information
- School type: Comprehensive school
- Established: 1890
- School district: Oceanside School District
- NCES District ID: 3621570
- Superintendent: Dr. Phyllis S. Harrington
- CEEB code: 334270
- NCES School ID: 362157003059
- Principal: Brendon Mitchell
- Teaching staff: 157.38 FTEs
- Grades: 9–12
- Gender: Coeducational
- Enrollment: 1,692 (2023–2024)
- Average class size: 15 Students
- Student to teacher ratio: 10.75
- Language: English
- Campus size: Large
- Campus type: Suburb
- Colors: Navy Blue and white
- Athletics conference: Conference 1 Nassau Section 8
- Team name: Sailors
- Website: www.oceansideschools.org

Oceanside High School (School #7) is an American public high school located in Oceanside, New York. It is part of the Oceanside School District.

The school was initially built on Merle Avenue, but moved to its current location on Skillman Avenue in 1955 and expanded to its current size in 1962. The school's mascot is the Sailor, and teams compete countywide in a variety of sports. The school's principal is Brendan Mitchell.

== Athletics ==
As of 2026-2027 school year, Oceanside High School' offers 17 separate sports, for Boys & Girls. With a Freshman, JV and Varsity levels offered.

Oceanside High School athletics
Sport	Boys' teams	Girls' teams
Football	Varsity, JV	Not Offered
Basketball	Varsity, JV	Varsity, JV
Baseball	Varsity, JV	Not Offered
Soccer	Varsity, JV, freshman	Varsity, JV
Track and field	Varsity	Varsity, freshman
Volleyball	Varsity, JV	Varsity, JV
Lacrosse	Varsity, JV	Varsity, JV
Softball	Not Offered	Varsity, JV
Wrestling	Varsity	Not Offered
Tennis	Varsity, JV	Varsity, JV
Swimming	Varsity	Varsity
Golf	Varsity, JV	Varsity
Cross country	Varsity	Varsity
Gymnastics	Not Offered	Varsity
Bowling	Varsity, JV	Varsity, JV
Flag football	Not Offered	Varsity
Cheerleading	Varsity	Varsity

== Academics ==
U.S. News & World Report ranks Oceanside High School as #202 overall in national high school education, and #2 in New York high school education.

== Demographics ==
As of the 2014–15 school year, the school had an enrollment of 1,782 students and 130.1 classroom teachers (on an FTE basis), for a student–teacher ratio of 13.7:1. There were 152 students (8.5% of enrollment) eligible for free lunch and 32 (1.8% of students) eligible for reduced-cost lunch.

== Notable alumni ==
- Bob Iger (born 1951, class of 1969), chairman and CEO of The Walt Disney Company
- David Paymer (born 1954), actor, comedian, and television director
- Jay Fiedler (born 1971), former American football quarterback in the National Football League (NFL)
- Randy Levine (born 1955), attorney and president of the New York Yankees baseball team
- Dennis Leonard (born 1951), pitcher for the Kansas City Royals in the late 1970s and early 1980s
- Art Heyman (1941–2012), NBA basketball player
- Samantha Cesario (born 1993), figure skater
- Wayne Diamond, fashion designer
- Stephen Robert Morse (born 1985), journalist and film director/producer
- Andrew Pollack (born 1966), author, school safety activist, and entrepreneur
- Marian Thurm (born 1952), author of short stories and novels
- Nicky Polanco (born 1980), lacrosse player
