= Stephen Robert Morse =

American filmmaker

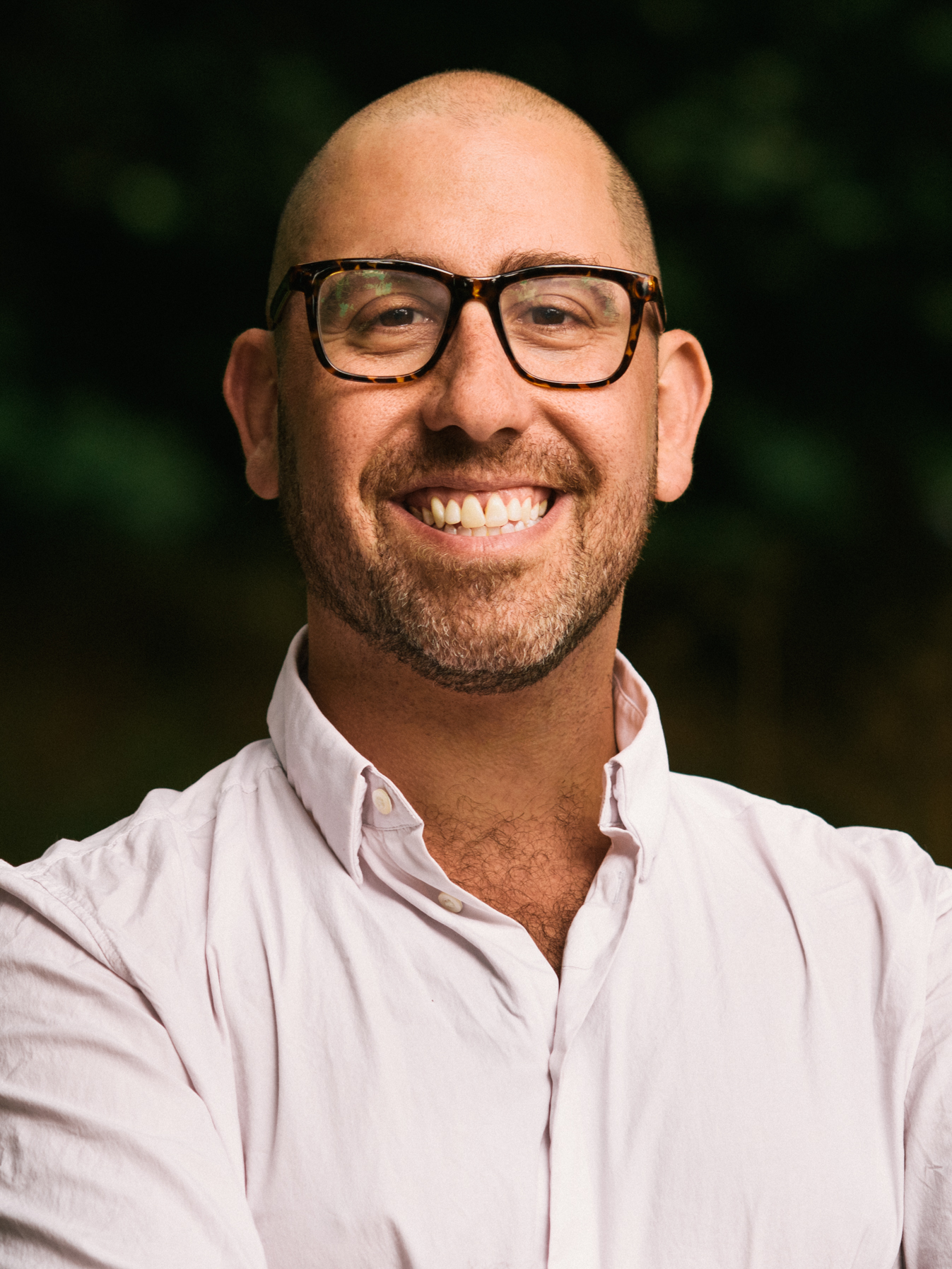
- Morse in 2020
- Born: Oceanside, New York, U.S.
- Education: Oceanside High School
- Alma mater: University of Pennsylvania; Green Templeton College, University of Oxford
- Occupations: Director; producer; writer; actor
- Website: morsecodegroup.com

Stephen Robert Morse is a British-American filmmaker. He is known for producing the Primetime Emmy Awards-nominated Amanda Knox, and directing and producing EuroTrump on Geert Wilders. He also earned a 42nd News & Documentary Emmy Awards nomination for writing In the Cold Dark Night. Morse is the director/producer of How to Rob a Bank, the 2024 Netflix Original. As of 2024, he headed the Morse Code Group.

== Early life and education ==
Stephen Robert Morse was born in Oceanside, New York.

He attended Oceanside High School and then the University of Pennsylvania. He graduated with an MBA from the Saïd Business School at Green Templeton College, University of Oxford.

== Career ==
=== Early work ===
After graduating, Morse worked for Mother Jones magazine.

At the University of Pennsylvania he directed and produced the feature documentary Ain't Easy Being Green, about the 2006 United States Senate election in Pennsylvania and Duet, a short film about street musician and future star of The Voice Anthony Riley.

In 2008, he shot a video of the New Black Panthers blocking the entrance to a polling location with a strong Democratic majority in Philadelphia during the 2008 United States Elections. The video was posted on YouTube and went viral with over a million views, prompting a Congressional investigation. Morse subsequently regretted the video's success, as it was regularly repeated on Fox News early in Barack Obama's presidential career. This allowed 2016 presidential candidate Donald Trump to warn Pennsylvania voters to watch out for fraud from Democratic supporters, a charge that Morse refuted, citing that the incident he witnessed was isolated. The Philadelphia incident became known as the New Black Panther Party voter intimidation case.

=== Amanda Knox ===
In 2016, Morse produced the Netflix documentary Amanda Knox. He started making the film while he was an Erasmus Mundus journalism student in 2011. The documentary covers Knox's life and wrongful prison sentence for murder and her subsequent acquittal. Morse was nominated for an Emmy Award for "Outstanding Documentary or Nonfiction Special".

=== EuroTrump ===
Morse produced EuroTrump, a film about the right-wing Dutch politician Geert Wilders, who has been compared to Donald Trump. Morse managed to gain Wilders' trust following his work on Amanda Knox; though he did not personally agree with Wilders on many issues, he felt it was important to respect them in order to find out more about Wilders' politics. He was given permission to film Wilders during campaigning for the 2017 Dutch general election, and consequently gained more access to Wilders than other news organizations. The film was released shortly after the Dutch elections at the Sheffield Documentary Festival as Wilders in June 2018. However, after this screening, Morse, believing in the Japanese concept of Kaizen, known in English as continuous improvement, added many additional edits to the film that was then rebranded as EuroTrump. The film discusses the rise of Twitter in politics, as Morse shows how Wilders bypasses traditional forms of media to go straight to "the people." The film begins with Morse soliciting Wilders' involvement. Morse said that Wilders is "actually much smarter than Trump" and "knows what he's doing". The film was screened at the International Film Festival in Ferrara, Italy. EuroTrump was subsequently released on Amazon and Hulu in the United States on June 30, 2018.

=== Koch Brothers project ===
In August, 2019, Variety reported that Morse purchased scripted and non-fiction rights to Daniel Schulman's book Sons of Wichita on the Koch Brothers.

=== In the Cold Dark Night ===
In 2020 Morse directed, produced, and wrote In the Cold Dark Night, a documentary on the racist murder of Timothy Coggins and its 35-year aftermath. Morse was nominated for a 2021 Emmy Award in the Outstanding Writing: Documentary category for the film.

=== Bad Hombres ===
Morse produced Bad Hombres, a documentary on the world's only bi-national sports team, the Tecolotes de los Dos Laredos, a Mexican professional baseball team that plays half of their home games across the border in Texas. The film premiered on Showtime Networks in 2020.

=== Untitled Luigi Mangione project ===
In December 2024, Vulture reported that Stephen Robert Morse was developing a documentary on Luigi Mangione, the alleged shooter of UnitedHealthCare CEO Brian Thompson.

== Other activities ==
In February 2009, Morse founded MyTwoCensus, a non-partisan, political watchdog group for the 2010 U.S. census.

Morse co-founded the tech consultancy firm Skillbridge, that was sold to Toptal in 2016.

As of 2024, Morse was managing director of the Morse Code Group.

== Style ==
Morse has said that working effectively within smaller budgets and limited time are important in making modern documentaries that deliver impact, as 24-hour news coverage and the rise of social media makes it such that documentaries must cover ground quickly while also providing in-depth characters and perspectives not gained from the news. This was why he initially released EuroTrump, originally called Wilders, only three months after the Dutch elections. He believes in a no-frills approach to making documentaries, while maintaining the highest artistic quality possible in productions. Commenting on EuroTrump, he said, "We only shoot the scenes we need, and never use more crew than we absolutely have to."
