= The Pirates of Central Park =

2001 film by Robert Farber

- Poster
- Directed by: Robert Farber
- Written by: Daniel Weitzman
- Based on: The Pirates of the Round Pond by Lord Dunsany
- Produced by: Adam Stone; Michelle Wilson
- Starring: Adam Lamberg; Joseph Dandry; Patrick Duffy; Michelle Harris; Jesse McCartney; Sasha Neulinger
- Cinematography: Peter Fernberger
- Edited by: Chris Hellman; Ed Helms
- Music by: Gary Schreiner
- Distributed by: Stone Entertainment
- Release date: January 1, 2001
- Running time: 33 minutes
- Country: United States
- Language: English

The Pirates of Central Park is a 2001 American family adventure short film, adapted from the short story The Pirates of the Round Pond by Lord Dunsany. Directed by Robert Farber, with a screenplay by Daniel Weitzman and produced by Adam Stone, it stars Adam Lamberg, singer and actor Jesse McCartney, Patrick Duffy and Michelle Harris. It was released to cinemas on January 1, 2001 and was an official selection of the 2001 Long Island International Film Expo and the 25th Cleveland International Film Festival.

== Plot ==
The film is an adventure, following the character Mike Bromback on his quest of self-discovery. The quest starts off with Mike reading about pirates in the library. Simon Baskin (Jesse McCartney) convinces him to take it one step further and become a pirate. Simon will one day meet Mike in Central Park with his friend Chas (or Charles to Mike). They discuss some technical matters and agree to meet the next Saturday. The next time they meet, Chas brings with him a toy ship with torpedoes. They look for the perfect model ship to sink in the pond. They find Captain Fatty and Gogher Boy (Sasha Neulinger), or at least that's what they call them, and decide to sink their ship. Each Saturday Captain Fatty and Gopher Boy bring a new ship and the gang keep sinking them until Captain Fatty and his son find out that it was Simon, Mike, and Chas who have been sinking his ship and thus Captain Fatty and Gopher Boy sink Simon's, Mike's, and Chas's ship.

== Cast ==
- Adam Lamberg as Mike Bromback
- Jesse McCartney as Simon Baskin
- Joseph Dandry as Captain Fatty
- Patrick Duffy as Chaz Farrington
- Michelle Harris as Corrine Bromback
- Sasha Neulinger as Bobby Walters
