= Oceanside Union Free School District =

School district in the U.S. state of New York

Address
- 145 Merle Avenue Oceanside, New York, 11572; United States
- Coordinates: 40.643217°N 73.635078°W

District information
- Type: Public
- Grades: K–12
- Superintendent: Dr. Phyllis S. Harrington
- NCES District ID: 3621570

Students and staff
- Students: 5,458 (2020–2021)
- Teachers: 478.15 (on an FTE basis)
- Staff: 579.0 (on an FTE basis)
- Student–teacher ratio: 11.41:1
- District mascot: Sailor

Other information
- Website: www.oceansideschools.org

Oceanside School District is a school district in Oceanside, New York. There are 10 schools with 854 full-time employees, of which 440 are teachers.

== Schools ==
- School #6 Early Learning Center
- Florence A. Smith Elementary School #2
- Oaks Elementary School #3
- South Oceanside Road Elementary School #4
- North Oceanside Road Elementary School #5
- Fulton Avenue Elementary School #8
- Boardman Elementary School #9E
- Oceanside Middle School
- Oceanside High School
- Castleton Academy High School of Oceanside

== See also ==
- List of school districts in New York
