= My Louisiana Sky =

1998 novel by Kimberly Willis Holt

- Author: Kimberly Willis Holt
- Language: English
- Genre: Children's novel, Historical fiction
- Publication date: 1998
- Publication place: United States
- Media type: Print (hardcover and paperback)
- Awards: Josette Frank Award (1998), Andrew Carnegie Medal (2022)

My Louisiana Sky is a 1998 novel by Kimberly Willis Holt.

== Plot summary ==
The novel is set in 1957, in the small town of Satter, Louisiana, where 12-year-old Tiger Ann Parker lives with her mentally challenged parents. She tries to get the popular girl in her class, Abby Lynn Anders, to like her but fails because of one of her mother's childish outbursts. Because of this, Tiger isn't invited to Abby Lynn's pool party. Her best friend, Jesse Wade Thompson, tries to comfort her and kisses her. Startled, she rejects him and runs home.

When her beloved grandmother suddenly dies, Tiger faces the choice of either staying with her parents or moving in with her glamorous Aunt Dorie Kay in Baton Rouge.

== Setting ==
Satter is based on the author's hometown of Forest Hill, Louisiana.

== Awards and honors ==
Awards and honors for My Louisiana Sky
Year	Award/Honor	Result	Ref.
1998	Josette Frank Award	Winner	
1999	American Library Association (ALA) Best Books for Young Adults	Top 10	
2000	ALA Amazing Audiobooks for Young Adults	Selection	
2000	Dorothy Canfield Fisher Children's Book Award	Nominee	
2022	Andrew Carnegie Medal	Winner	

== Film adaptation ==
In 2001, Hyperion and Showtime produced a successful film adaptation of My Louisiana Sky, starring Kelsey Keel as Tiger Ann Parker, Amelia Campbell as Corinna Ramsey Parker, Chris Owens as Lonnie Parker, Michael Cera as Jesse Wade, Shirley Knight as grandmother, and Juliette Lewis as Aunt Dorie Kay. The film was adapted by Anna Sandor and directed by Adam Arkin. The film was shot in Canada.
