= Randy Levine =

American lawyer

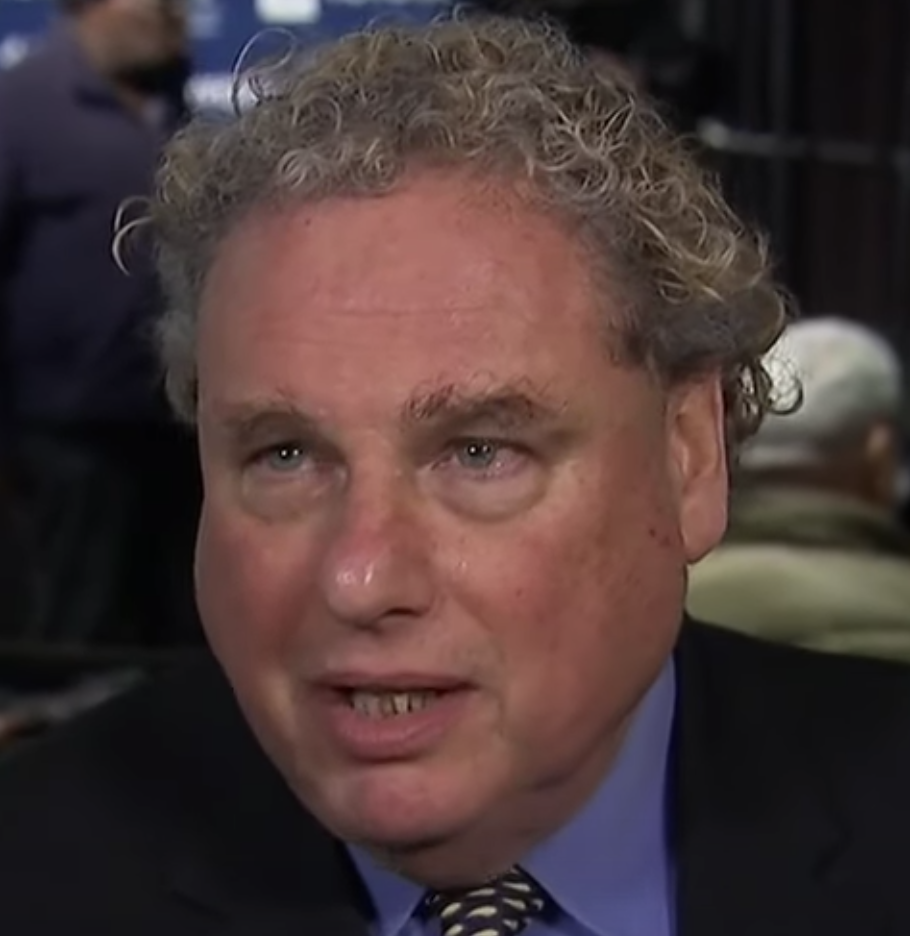
- Levine at a Gerrit Cole press conference, 2019
- Born: Randy Lewis Levine; February 22, 1955 (age 71); New York City, New York, U.S.
- Education: George Washington University (BA); Hofstra University (JD)
- Political party: Republican

Randy Lewis Levine (born February 22, 1955) is an American attorney, the current president of the New York Yankees baseball club and a member of the Board of Directors of A.C. Milan S.p.A.

== Early life ==
Levine, a Jewish American, was born in Brooklyn, New York, to Isaac and Arlene L. (née Rosenfeld) Levine. He graduated from Oceanside High School in Nassau County on Long Island, where he played varsity football, in 1973.

He earned a Bachelor of Arts degree from George Washington University in 1977 and a J.D. from Hofstra University School of Law in 1980. Levine was a member of the Board of Trustees of George Washington University. He is a member of the New York Bar.

== Career ==
Levine served as principal associate deputy attorney general and principal deputy associate attorney general at the U.S. Department of Justice during the Reagan administration. He resigned in 1988. After five years in private practice, he served as New York City's Labor Commissioner from 1994-1995. He was the chief labor negotiator for Major League Baseball and negotiated the 1996 MLB labor agreement.

He left Major League Baseball to become New York City's Deputy Mayor for Economic Development, Planning and Administration from 1997 to 2000. In January 2000, he announced his resignation from Rudy Giuliani's administration, citing his desire to return to private practice; he was named president of the Yankees the next day.

=== President of the New York Yankees (2000–present) ===
Since the 2000 season, Levine has served as President of the Yankees. During his tenure the team has won World Series championships in 2000 and 2009, built the new Yankee Stadium, and launched the YES Network, a pay television regional sports network owned by Yankee Global Enterprises, Main Street Sports Group, Amazon, the Blackstone Group, RedBird Capital and Mubadala Investment Company. Levine also played a significant role in the involvement by Yankee Global Enterprises in other sports, including the founding of the New York City Football Club, an affiliate of Major League Soccer, and acquisition of an ownership stake in AC Milan.

In 2007, he was named to BusinessWeek's list of the 100 most influential people in sports, at number 77. He is also Of Counsel with the national labor and employment law firm Jackson Lewis P.C. In 2012, 2013, 2014 and 2016, Levine won Emmy Awards as Executive Producer for YES Network's Forbes SportsMoney show.

=== AC Milan (2023–present) ===
On January 21, 2023, RedBird Capital announced that Levine would join AC Milan's board of directors.

== Politics ==
Levine was a "bundler" for John McCain's 2008 presidential campaign, and raised between $100,000 and $250,000 for McCain in 2008.

In December 2018, Levine's name was leaked as a potential replacement for departing White House Chief of Staff John F. Kelly. Levine dismissed those rumors, saying he is content with the Yankees.

== Personal life ==
Levine resides in Manhattan and also on his farm in Pawling, New York with his wife Mindy Franklin Levine and their seven dogs. Levine is very active in animal rescue efforts and is a proponent of equine-assisted therapy for military veterans. He currently serves on the Board of Trustees of Hofstra University, the Taylor Hooton Foundation, and the Yogi Berra Museum.
