= Adam Lamberg =

American actor (born 1984)

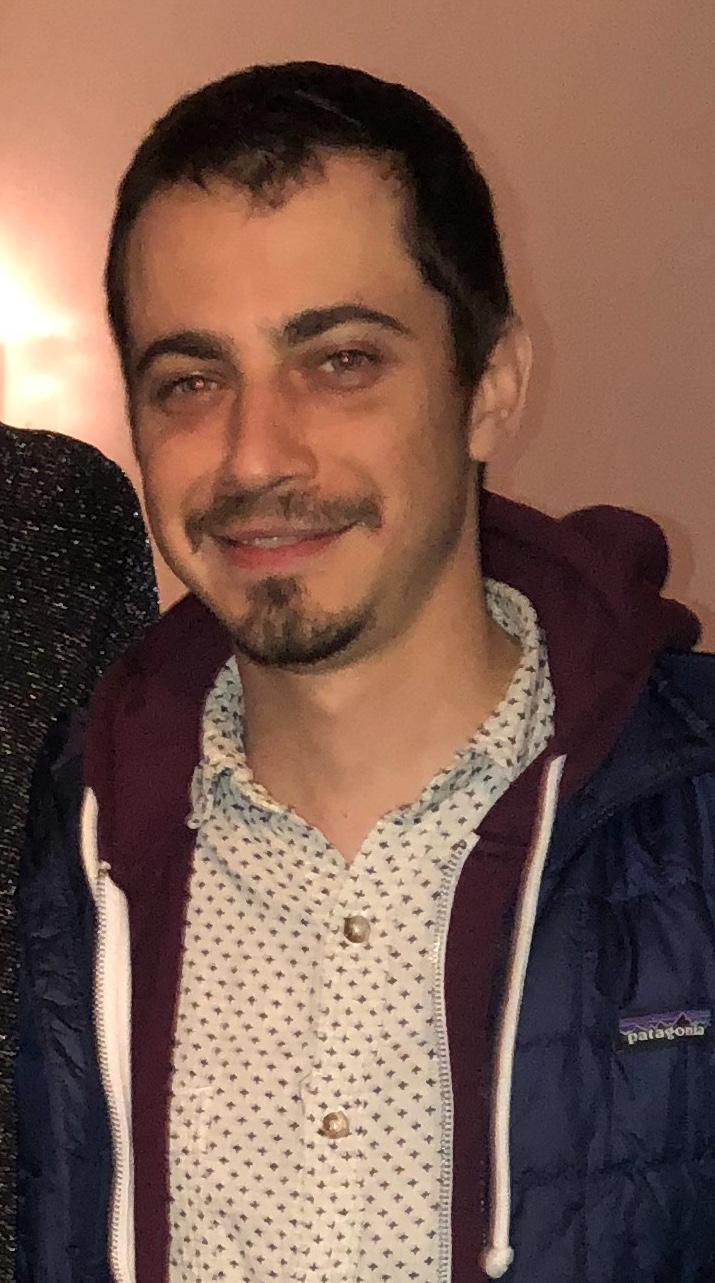
- Lamberg in 2018
- Born: September 14, 1984 (age 42); New York City, U.S.
- Occupation: Actor
- Years active: 1995–2008

Adam Lamberg (born September 14, 1984) is an American actor. He portrayed David "Gordo" Gordon in the Disney Channel series Lizzie McGuire from 2001 through 2004, and in The Lizzie McGuire Movie.

== Early life ==
Adam Lamberg was born in New York City on September 14, 1984. His father is Jewish. His mother is French-Canadian. Lamberg described himself as a "cultural Jew".

Before joining the reboot series, he worked at the Irish Arts Center in Manhattan.

== Later works ==
In 2019, it was announced that he would reprise his role as David "Gordo" Gordon in a Lizzie McGuire revival for Disney+, but Disney later decided to not go forward with the project.

== Filmography ==
=== Film ===
Year	Title	Role	Notes
1996	Radiant City	Stewie Goodman	
1996	I'm Not Rappaport	Spiderman Kid	Appearances
2001	The Pirates of Central Park	Mike Bromback	Short film
2001	Lonesome	Jason Randolph	
2001	Max Keeble's Big Move	Eighth Grader on Bike	
2002	What's Up in the Environment?	himself	Host
2003	The Lizzie McGuire Movie	David "Gordo" Gordon	
2005	When Do We Eat?	Lionel Stuckman	
2008	Beautiful Loser	Teen Reggie	

=== Television ===
Year	Title	Role	Notes
1995	Another World	Billy Dugan	1 episode
1996	Dead Man's Walk	Willy Carey	1 episode
1998	The Day Lincoln Was Shot	Thomas "Tad" Lincoln	Television film
2001–2004	Lizzie McGuire	David "Gordo" Gordon	Main role
2002	What's Up in the Environment?	Himself	Main role
