= MyTwoCensus =

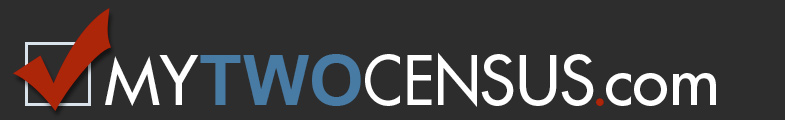
- MyTwoCensus' logo
- Formation: February 2009
- Type: political
- Purpose: Monitor 2010 U.S. census
- Headquarters: San Francisco, California, United States
- Official language: English
- Founder: Stephen Robert Morse
- Website: www.mytwocensus.com

MyTwoCensus is a census tracking group. It was created in February 2009 for the 2010 U.S. census. It tracks topics such as the constitutionality of including illegal immigrants in the census.

== History ==
The group was created by Stephen Robert Morse, a journalist and filmmaker as a project to identify reasons why the 2010 U.S. census would be a controversial process. As part of this process, Morse applied and won a grant through The Robert Novak Journalism Fellowship program from the Phillips Foundation. The award allowed Morse to continue his pet project. Morse first developed the idea as he was on Craigslist, looking for an additional job in San Francisco soon after college graduation, and noticed that the US Census Bureau was looking to hire employees in the Bay Area at the rate of $22-$26 per hour. After further research, Morse and University of Pennsylvania friend Evan Goldin created the group's website and blog, MyTwoCensus.com, in order to provide unofficial oversight for the U.S. Census Bureau. In March 2010, the site added a community message board operated through the social-networking site, Ning. Journalists from The Washington Post and CNN have cited MyTwoCensus in their reporting.

== Activities ==
The MyTwoCensus website reports on the handling of the census. MyTwoCensus is headed by two journalists: Morse and Goldin. Morse has said that he utilizes Google News, and attends census worker recruitment sessions in his reporting. In 2009, MyTwoCensus discovered that the U.S. Census Bureau had supposedly paid the delivery company FedEx several million dollars over time to mail documents that were not time-sensitive. The group publicized the findings after a census worker wrote to the website questioning the bureau's use of "priority overnight delivery." The group has been critical of Census Bureau management, including Robert M. Groves the current Director of the United States Census Bureau, as well as both Republicans and Democrats for their handling of 2010 Census operations. MyTwoCensus has been mentioned in right-wing publications, such as that of conservative blogger Michelle Malkin. Though most MyTwoCensus reports are authored by Morse himself, other journalists, including Emily Babay and Emily Schultheis of The Daily Pennsylvanian and Laura Masnerus (formerly of The New York Times) have written for the site as well.
