= Miles Davis: Birth of the Cool =

Documentary film

- Poster
- Directed by: Stanley Nelson Jr.
- Produced by: Stanley Nelson Jr.; Nicole London
- Narrated by: Carl Lumbly
- Edited by: Lewis Erskine
- Release date: January 2019 (Sundance Film Festival)
- Running time: 114 minutes
- Language: English

Miles Davis: Birth of the Cool is a 2019 American documentary film about Miles Davis, directed by Stanley Nelson Jr.

== Production ==
The film was made for the PBS American Masters television series and premiered at the 2019 Sundance Film Festival. It uses interviews that Nelson has done with people who knew Davis, and with scholars, as well as still photographs and film clips. The text of the voice-over narration (performed by Carl Lumbly) is entirely by Davis.

== Accolades ==
The film won two Emmy Awards in 2021 for Outstanding Arts and Culture Documentary and Outstanding Sound. It was also nominated for Best Music Film at the 62nd Annual Grammy Awards in 2019, but lost to Beyoncé's Homecoming.

== Cast ==
- Carl Lumbly (as Miles Davis; narrator)
- Miles Davis (as self; archive footage)
- Frances Taylor Davis (as self)
- Reginald Petty (as self)
- Quincy Troupe (as self)
- Farah Griffin (as self)
- Lee Annie Bonner (as self)
- Ashley Kahn (as self)
- Benjamin Cawthra (as self)
- Billy Eckstine (as self; archive footage)
- Walter Cronkite (as self; archive footage)
- Jimmy Heath (as self)
- Jimmy Cobb (as self)
- Dan Morgenstern (as self)
- Charlie Parker (as self; archive footage)
- Greg Tate (as self)
- Gerald Early (as self)
- Quincy Jones (as self)
- Wayne Shorter (as self)
- Ron Carter (as self)
- George Wein (as self)
- Stanley Crouch (as self)
- Herbie Hancock (as self)

== See also ==
- List of American Masters episodes
- Cool jazz
- Modal jazz
