= When Zachary Beaver Came to Town =

- DVD cover
- Directed by: John Schultz
- Screenplay by: John Schultz
- Based on: When Zachary Beaver Came to Town by Kimberly Willis Holt
- Produced by: Michael Corrente; Amy Robinson; Jay Julien
- Starring: Sasha Joseph Neulinger; Jonathan Lipnicki; Cody Linley; Jesse Plemons; Jane Krakowski; Eric Stoltz
- Cinematography: Shawn Maurer
- Edited by: John Pace
- Music by: Richard Gibbs
- Production company: Revere Pictures
- Distributed by: Echo Bridge Home Entertainment
- Release date: October 9, 2003
- Running time: 85 minutes
- Country: United States
- Language: English
- Budget: $3 million

When Zachary Beaver Came to Town is a 2003 American comedy-drama film directed by John Schultz and starring Jonathan Lipnicki and Cody Linley. It was adapted from a National Book Award-winning children's novel of the same name by Kimberly Willis Holt.

== Plot ==
Toby Wilson (Jonathan Lipnicki) is a 12-year-old boy who lives with his parents in the small, sleepy town of Granger, Texas, but his mother runs off to Nashville to try to become a singer. One summer, Toby's life changes when he and his best friend Cal McKnight (Cody Linley) meet a 14-year-old fat sideshow freak named Zachary Beaver (Sasha Neulinger), who has no parents or friends. Zachary spends most of his time in a small, silver trailer; he is abandoned by his legal guardian, Paulie Rankin, so Paulie can look for new additions to their circus. Toby and Cal get to know him, and slowly become friends with him.

They cope with the loss of Cal's brother, Wayne, who was recruited for the Vietnam War and later dies, leaving Cal devastated. Toby had been sending letters to Wayne pretending to be Cal until Wayne is killed, and Toby finally tells him this which leads to a fight between the two. Meanwhile, Toby is in Zachary's trailer during the funeral and Cal shows up. He gives Toby all the money he ever borrowed and tells him his mom is never coming back, just like Wayne. Later, Toby gives a country girl he likes a necklace, which was his mother's, but she gives it back to him because she likes someone else and doesn't like Toby that way. Earlier, Toby got to dance with her after her boyfriend broke up with her. Cal and Toby become friends after Toby chases him down to a lake soon after. In the end, they help Zachary get baptized in Gossimer Lake with the alcoholic preacher/cook owner of a local cafe, Ferris, who once studied to be a priest; later Paulie returns with circus performers to retrieve him. Zachary leaves town with them, and Cal and Toby's friendship is reaffirmed.

== Production ==
In order to play the role of Toby, Lipnicki attempted to gain the rights to the book when he was only ten years old, but was unsuccessful. He was later cast after he agreed to work with director John Schultz on the film Like Mike.

The film was shot in the cities of Austin and Granger in Texas.

== Cast ==
- Jonathan Lipnicki as Toby Wilson
- Cody Linley as Cal McKnight
- Jesse Pennington as Wayne
- Jane Krakowski as Heather Wilson
- Eric Stoltz as Otto Wilson
- Kevin Fitzgerald Corrigan as Paulie
- Sarah Whalen as Sally in the Pick-up
- Louanne Stephens as Earline
- Hudson Long as Wylie Womack
- Lou Perryman as Ferris
- Brady Coleman as Sheriff
- Kathleen Lancaster as Kate McKnight
- Amanda Alch as Scarlet
- Joanna McCray as Tara
- David Little as Thoughtful Farmer
- Peter Harrell Jr. as Man with Video Camera
- Sasha Joseph Neulinger as Zachary Beaver
- Chris Muniz as Juan
- Melinda Renna as Mrs. McKnight
- Brett Brock as Mr. McKnight
- Ryan Harper Gray as Billy McKnight
- Jesse Plemons as Jay, the Trailer Bully
- Libby Langdon as Vivien, Scarlet's Mom
- Lawrence Varnado as US Army Officer
- Everett Sifuentes as Priest
- Elliot Schrock as High School Guy at Gas Station
- Tim Mateer as Dad at Gas Station
- Ken Thomas as Highway Patrolman
- Doug MacMillan as Tow Truck Driver
- Daniel Browning Smith as Pablo
- Kimberly A. Shafer as Esther
- Michael Schmid as Army Officer #2
- Boone the Dog as Muchacho
