= Bad Hombres =

- Directed by: Andrew Glazer
- Music by: Tomás Barriero
- Country of origin: United States
- Original languages: English; Spanish

Production
- Executive producers: Stephen Espinoza; Vinnie Malhotra
- Producers: Andrew Glazer; Stephen Robert Morse; Max Peltz; Myles Estey
- Running time: 107 minutes
- Production companies: Mission Critical Productions; Lone Wolf Studios

Original release
- Network: Showtime
- Release: October 16, 2020

Bad Hombres is a 2020 American documentary film about the Tecolotes de los Dos Laredos, a professional binational baseball team that played half of its home games in Texas during the 2019 baseball season.

== Synopsis ==
The documentary focuses on Tecolotes de los Dos Laredos, a Minor League Baseball team (the world's only binational pro baseball team), as well as on their families. Shot during the team's 2019 season, the documentary follows them during 120 games and explores Mexico–United States relations.

== Release ==
Bad Hombres was released on Showtime on October 16, 2020.

== Reception ==
In a review for the Houston Chronicle, Matt Young wrote that Bad Hombres had touching moments.
