= Kimberly Willis Holt =

American writer of children's literature

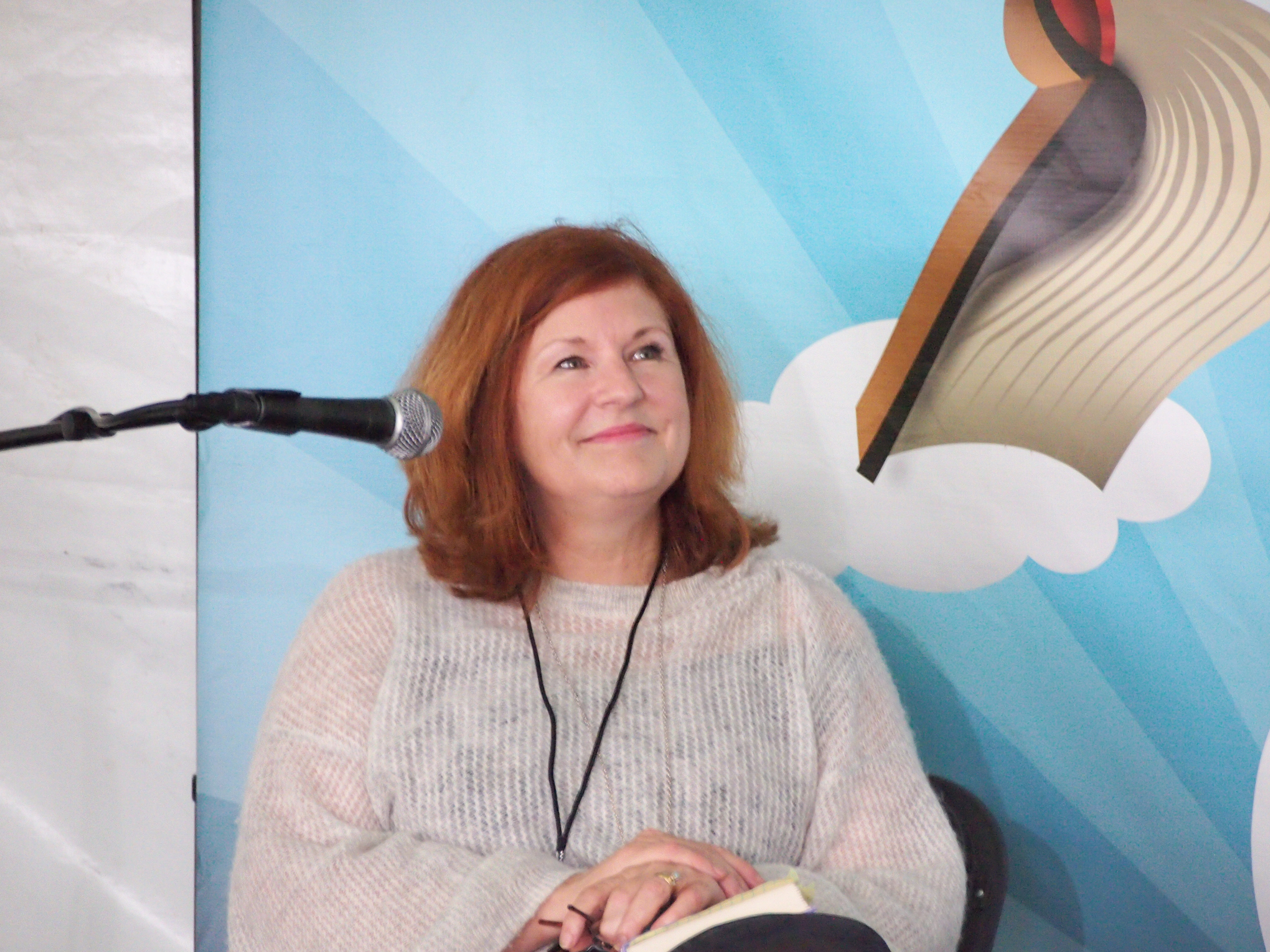
- Holt at the 2017 Gaithersburg Book Festival
- Born: Pensacola, Florida
- Occupation: Writer
- Writing career
- Notable work: When Zachary Beaver Came to Town

Kimberly Willis Holt is an American writer of children's books. She is best known for the novel When Zachary Beaver Came to Town, which won the 1999 U.S. National Book Award for Young People's Literature. It was adapted as a 2003 film of the same name.

== Books ==
- My Louisiana Sky (Henry Holt and Co., 1998)
- Mister and Me (Puffin, 1998)
- When Zachary Beaver Came to Town (Holt, 1999)
- Dancing in Cadillac Light (Holt, 2001)
- Keeper of the Night (Holt, 2003)
- Part of Me (Holt, 2006)
- The Water Seeker (Holt, 2010
- Dear Hank Williams (Holt, 2015)
- Blooming at the Texas Sunrise Motel (Holt, 2017)
- The Lost Boy's Gift (Holt, 2019)
- The Ambassador of Nowhere, Texas (Holt, 2021)

== Piper Reed chapter books ==
1. Piper Reed, Navy Brat (Holt, 2007)
2. Piper Reed, The Great Gypsy (Holt, 2008)
3. Piper Reed Gets a Job (Holt, 2009)
4. Piper Reed, Campfire Girl (Holt, 2010)
5. Piper Reed, Rodeo Star (Holt, 2011)
6. Piper Reed, Forever Friend (Holt, 2012)

== Picture books ==
- Waiting for Gregory illustrated by Gabi Swiatkowska (Holt, 2006)
- The Adventures Of Granny Clearwater And Little Critter (Holt, 2007)
- Skinny Brown Dog (Holt, 2007)
- Dinner with the Highbrows, illustrated by Kyrsten Brooker (Henry Holt and Co., 2014)

== Awards ==
- When Zachary Beaver Came to Town, 1999, National Book Award for Young People's Literature
