= Topic: The Washington & Jefferson College Review =

- Discipline: Humanities
- Language: English

Publication details
- Former name(s): Topic: A Journal of the Liberal Arts
- History: 1961-present
- Publisher: Washington & Jefferson College (United States)
- Frequency: Annual

Standard abbreviations
- ISO 4: Topic

Indexing
- ISSN: 0049-4127
- OCLC no.: 1586535

Links
- Journal homepage

Topic: The Washington and Jefferson College Review, also known as Topic or Topic: A Journal of the Liberal Arts, is a peer-reviewed academic journal focused on the humanities and the liberal arts.

It was established in 1961 as Topic: A Journal of the Liberal Arts. In Fall 2004, the name was changed to Topic: The Washington & Jefferson College Review.

The journal is published annually by the Washington & Jefferson College faculty and is printed in monograph format. Each issue contains several academic essays from a number of different disciplines on a specific topic. Past topics have included John Keats, the Whiskey Rebellion, pirates, Rebecca Harding Davis, religion in the eighteenth century, and Italian Americans in Western Pennsylvania. The journal follows The Chicago Manual of Style. The editorial policy has a special focus on interdisciplinary articles.

The journal is indexed by the MLA International Bibliography, American Humanities Index, Abstracts of English Studies, and EBSCO's Humanities International Complete. It is a member of the Council of Editors of Learned Journals.
