= How to Rob a Bank (2024 film) =

- Release poster
- Directed by: Stephen Robert Morse; Seth Porges
- Written by: Maxim Gertler-Jaffe; Max Peltz; Stephen Robert Morse; Seth Porges
- Produced by: Max Peltz; Maxim Gertler-Jaffe; Stephen Robert Morse; Seth Porges
- Cinematography: Jacob Sacks Jones; Domenic Barbaro
- Edited by: Paulo Padilha, Mark Vives, Simon Barker
- Music by: Leo Birenberg; Ramiro Rodriguez Zamarripa
- Production companies: Lone Wolf Studios, Pinball Party Productions
- Distributed by: Netflix
- Release date: 2024
- Running time: 87 minutes
- Country: United States
- Language: English

How to Rob a Bank is a 2024 American documentary film, directed by Stephen Robert Morse and Seth Porges. The film is about Scott Scurlock, also known as The Hollywood Bandit, who robbed 19 confirmed banks in Seattle between 1992 and 1996. It premiered on Netflix on June 5, 2024.

== Synopsis ==
Featuring interviews with the Hollywood Bandits bank robbers themselves, law enforcement and characters from the Pacific Northwest, the documentary chronicles the rise of Scott Scurlock as he becomes the bank robber known as Hollywood, America's most successful bank robber.

== Reception ==
As of July 2024, this film has an approval rating of 100% on Rotten Tomatoes, based on 12 reviews. The film was in Netflix's top 10 most watched films for two weeks and the third most watched streaming original movie the week it was released.
