= Rewind (2019 film) =

- Film poster
- Directed by: Sasha Neulinger
- Produced by: Sasha Neulinger; Avela Grenier; Robert Schneeweis; Shasta Grenier Winston
- Cinematography: Rick Smith
- Production companies: Cedar Creek Productions; Grizzly Creek Films; Step 1 Films
- Release dates: April 27, 2019 (Tribeca); May 8, 2020 (Online)
- Running time: 86 minutes
- Country: United States
- Language: English

Rewind is a 2019 American documentary film directed by Sasha Neulinger. The film documents a family's struggle to understand and come to terms with multiple cases of child abuse, culminating in three criminal prosecutions. The film makes extensive use of the family's camcorder footage recorded before, during, and after the period in which the abuse occurred.

The film includes coverage of the high-profile prosecution of Howard Nevison, a former cantor at the Jewish congregation of Temple Emanu-El in New York.

The film was part-funded via crowdfunding website Kickstarter. The funding campaign commenced on 30 March 2014, and was marketed as "Rewind To Fast-Forward" and raised just over US$175,000.

== Accolades ==
- Tribeca Film Festival – Special Jury Mention
- Atlanta Jewish Film Festival – Documentary Jury Prize
