= Amanda Knox (film) =

2016 American documentary film

- Promotional poster
- Directed by: Rod Blackhurst; Brian McGinn
- Written by: Matthew Hamachek; Brian McGinn
- Produced by: Blackhurst; Mette Heide; Brian McGinn; Stephen Robert Morse
- Cinematography: Rod Blackhurst
- Edited by: Matthew Hamachek
- Music by: Danny Bensi Saunder Jurriaans
- Distributed by: Netflix
- Release dates: September 10, 2016 (Toronto International Film Festival); September 30, 2016 (United States)
- Running time: 92 minutes
- Country: United States
- Languages: English, Italian

Amanda Knox is a 2016 American documentary film about Amanda Knox, twice convicted and later acquitted of the 2007 murder of Meredith Kercher. It premiered at the Toronto International Film Festival on September 10, 2016, and on Netflix on September 30, 2016.

== Synopsis ==
Featuring interviews with Amanda Knox, her ex-boyfriend Raffaele Sollecito, Italian prosecutor Giuliano Mignini, and Daily Mail reporter Nick Pisa, the documentary chronicles the murder of Knox's roommate Meredith Kercher and the subsequent investigation, trials and appeals. Her notoriety bolstered by tabloid journalism, Knox was convicted of murder and spent four years in an Italian prison before her acquittal by the Supreme Court of Cassation. "I think I'm trying to explain what it feels like to be wrongfully convicted," Knox explained in an interview. "To either be this terrible monster or to be this regular person who is vulnerable."

== Reception ==
=== Critical response ===
Amanda Knox has an approval rating of 82% on Rotten Tomatoes, based on 50 reviews with an average score of 7.0/10. The website's critics consensus reads, "Amanda Knox honors its subject with an absorbing – if slightly incomplete – look at the details and troubling implications of her arrest and subsequent fight for freedom." On Metacritic, the film has a weighted average score of 78 out of 100, based on 17 critics, indicating "generally favorable" reviews.

=== Accolades ===
The film was nominated for the Primetime Emmy Awards for Outstanding Documentary or Nonfiction Special and Outstanding Writing for Nonfiction Programming.
