= Father Soldier Son =

2020 documentary film

- Official promotional poster
- Directed by: Catrin Einhorn; Leslye Davis
- Produced by: Leslye Davis; Catrin Einhorn; Kathleen Lingo; Nancy Donaldson Gauss
- Starring: Brian Eisch
- Cinematography: Leslye Davis
- Edited by: Amy Foote
- Music by: Nathan Halpern
- Production company: Netflix
- Distributed by: Netflix
- Release date: July 17, 2020
- Running time: 99 minutes
- Country: United States
- Language: English

Father Soldier Son is a 2020 American documentary film directed and produced by Catrin Einhorn and Leslye Davis. It follows the family of Brian Eisch, a Sgt. First Class in the United States Army, and the effects of his deployment to the War in Afghanistan has on him and his young sons. The film was released on July 17, 2020, by Netflix.

== Synopsis ==
In 2010, U.S. Army Sgt. First Class Brian Eisch is a single father of two sons, Isaac, age 12, and Joey, age 7. While he is away on deployment in Afghanistan for 6 months, the boys live with their uncle, and long to have their father back home. They are happily reunited for a brief 2-week interlude in the deployment, during which they enjoy camping, hunting, and fishing together. Brian expresses that his greatest fear is returning home affected by his wartime experiences, and potentially becoming angry and yelling at his kids, a sentiment echoed by his kids, who have heard such stories from their friends.

Back in the field, Brian is shot in the leg while attempting to rescue an Afghan National Army comrade. At Walter Reed Medical Center, Brian's leg is treated, although doctors cannot guarantee it will heal and tell him to consider amputation. Brian struggles to continue with his hobbies, being in debilitating pain, and finds himself struggling to continue with daily life. He mentions his feelings of being a "used-to-could", an individual who used to be useful to the Army and country, and ponders whether he is a burden on the institution that he loves.

Three years later, Brian has his leg amputated at the VA Center in Syracuse. He is supported by his girlfriend, Maria, who also brings her third child, Jordan, to live with the family. At age 10, Jordan enjoys playing with Joey, now of the same age. Brian, meanwhile, struggles with the delayed healing process for his leg, and his repeated inability to start using a prosthetic. Eventually, however, he is able to progress and begin to move around slowly. Having previously been a successful wrestler in high school, he coaches Joey from the sidelines, but Joey doesn't respond well to his more aggressive coaching. Brian proposes to Maria on a family outing.

Eight months after amputation, Brian progresses to a more advanced prosthetic and starts to tentatively run short distances on his own. He also begins to sell plastic bass lures, to occupy some of his time during the bleak winter months. Joey aspires for a career in the Army, while Isaac, somewhat disillusioned by the separation inherent in the military lifestyle, expresses his hopes to go to college and become a police officer. Brian and Maria are happily married, with both expressing their desire to love all of the children as their own.

Two months after this happy time, in July 2015, the family is struck by tragedy when Joey, age 12, is struck by a truck while on his bicycle outside the family home. He dies in the hospital and the family buries him shortly thereafter in a ceremony with much of the community. All of the family are profoundly affected, but hope to slowly move on, without forgetting their beloved son. That fall, Isaac starts his last year of high school alongside Jordan, and eventually decides to enlist in the Army. While he previously resolved not to do so, he feels somewhat obligated in the honour of Joey and his father, with Brian in particular being extremely proud to see his son in uniform. Isaac goes to his senior prom and graduates from high school shortly afterwards.

The family says a tearful but proud goodbye to Isaac as he departs for Basic Combat Training. While he is there, Brian and Maria share the news that they are expecting a son, Jaxon. The family is overjoyed to see Isaac graduate and begin military service. With Jaxon's birth, the family begins to move emotionally forward from Joey's tragic death.

Two years later, in 2019, Isaac expresses some of his regrets about military life, and it not necessarily being what he idolized it to be. He also shares that he has begun to feel depressed over the past year, feeling the weight of his biological mother leaving, his father's injury, and brother's death all at once. The family is seen happily with Jaxon, although Maria states that Brian hides his internal anger, still wishing he was the man he once was both physically and mentally. The film closes with Isaac expressing his hope that he can live up to his father's record in the military, and be like the man he has looked up to his entire life.

== Production ==
Filmmakers Leslye Davis and Catrin Einhorn are journalists with The New York Times. The project originated when Einhorn and James Dao reported on the life of Sgt. First Class Brian Eisch, a single father deployed to Afghanistan. Marcus Yam and Damon Winter shot photographs and video for an article and multimedia piece, published in 2010, that showed the effects of his service on him and his two young sons. Einhorn asked Davis to join her in 2014 to continue documenting the family, and over the years the pair decided to turn it into a feature-length film.

== Reception ==
On Rotten Tomatoes, the film holds an approval rating of 91% based on 34 reviews, with an average rating of 7.8/10. The website's critics consensus reads: "Taking the long view in its look at a military family's emotional journey allows Father Soldier Son to offer a uniquely moving perspective on the effects of war." On Metacritic, the film has a weighted average score of 73 out of 100, based on 10 critics, indicating "generally favorable reviews".

Frank Scheck of The Hollywood Reporter called the film "deeply revealing and non-judgmental" and wrote: "The result is a deeply intimate and revealing family portrait that proves admirable in its objectivity if occasionally frustrating in its sprawling sketchiness." Writing for The New York Times, Jessica Kiang said: "Father Soldier Son is about a family shaped by war. But the film is quiet, captured in Davis's cleareyed, gray-skied photography, softened by Nathan Halpern's plangent score and arranged in a clever chronology. Like life, it sometimes skips years, only to land on an evening that feels like an epoch."
