= Sasha Neulinger =

American actor and director (born 1989)

- Born: Sasha Joseph Neulinger; September 20, 1989 (age 37); Philadelphia, Pennsylvania, U.S.
- Occupation: Actor

Sasha Joseph Neulinger (born 20 September 1989) is an American actor and director born in Philadelphia, Pennsylvania.

== Early life ==
Neulinger is the son of Henry Neulinger, a History Channel editor, and Jackie Neulinger, a homemaker. When he found out he could make his family laugh Neulinger wanted to make the entire world laugh. He obtained a manager and appeared in commercials for Office Depot, Tylenol and Pathmark.

== Rewind documentary ==
Neulinger's documentary Rewind, about rewatching home videos taken by his father to help reveal generations of abuse, received Special Jury Mention at the 2019 Tribeca Film Festival.

== Filmography ==
- Camp Hell as Jimmy
- Law & Order: Special Victims Unit as Charlie Monaghan (1 episode, 2005)
- When Zachary Beaver Came to Town (2003) as Zachary Beaver
- Shallow Hal (2001) as Young Harold "Hal" Larson
- The Pirates of Central Park (2001) as Bobby Walters
- Unbreakable (2000) as Thermometer Boy
- Rewind (2019) as director
