= In the Cold Dark Night =

In The Cold Dark Night
- Directed by: Stephen Robert Morse; Nick Hampson
- Written by: Stephen Robert Morse; Max Peltz; Miikka Leskinen
- Produced by: Stephen Robert Morse; Max Peltz
- Cinematography: Nick Hampson; Anthony Rubinstein; Jacob Sacks-Jones
- Edited by: Miikka Leskinen
- Music by: Harry Brokensha
- Production companies: Lone Wolf Studios, RadicalMedia
- Distributed by: Sky Documentaries; Now TV (Sky); 20/20 (American TV program); Hulu
- Release date: 2020
- Running time: 92 minutes
- Country: United States
- Language: English

In The Cold Dark Night is a 2020 American documentary film about the murder of Timothy Coggins in Spalding County, Georgia in 1983 and the Coggins family's subsequent 35-year quest for justice. The project was nominated for a 2021 News & Documentary Emmy Award for Outstanding Writing: Documentary. The film was also nominated for the Oglethorpe Award for Excellence in Georgia Cinema by the Georgia Film Critics Association.

The film premiered in the US as a special event on 20/20 on July 17, 2020, and on Hulu immediately after. It has aired in the UK on Sky Documentaries since October 8, 2020.

== Production ==
Filming commenced in Griffin, Georgia and Spalding County, Georgia in January, 2018. The trials of the two men accused of murdering Timothy Coggins occurred in July and August, 2018.

In the Cold Dark Night received a grant from The Rogovy Foundation's Miller/Packan Documentary Film Fund for the summer of 2020.

== Reception ==
Executive Producer Wesley Lowery wrote a widely shared article about the story behind the film in GQ. Additionally, the Nieman Foundation for Journalism at Harvard discussed the film, comparing the process of working on the film with the process of writing an article about the same topic.
