= Born to Be (film) =

- Official release poster
- Directed by: Tania Cypriano
- Produced by: Michelle Koo Hayashi
- Cinematography: Jeffrey Johnson
- Edited by: Scott K. Foley; Christopher White
- Music by: Troy Herion
- Production company: Transformation Productions LLC
- Distributed by: Kino Lorber
- Release dates: September 28, 2019 (New York Film Festival); November 18, 2020 (United States)
- Running time: 92 minutes
- Country: United States
- Language: English

Born to Be (also known as Transformation) is a 2019 American documentary film directed by Tania Cypriano. The film follows a doctor who strives to give transgender people full access to health and surgical care.

It premiered at the New York Film Festival on September 28, 2019, and was scheduled to be released online on November 18, 2020.

== Production ==
The film was shot in New York City, New York, United States.

== Release ==
The film is scheduled to be released online by Kino Lorber on November 18, 2020.

== Reception ==
=== Critical response ===
On review aggregator website Rotten Tomatoes, the film holds an approval rating of 100% based on 20 critic reviews, with an average rating of 8.5/10. Norman Gidney of Film Threat scored the film 7/10 and said "Born To Be humanizes has what it is to be trans and makes the struggle something you can feel." Variety's Owen Gleiberman reviewed the film positively, saying that it is "A moving and fascinatingly forward-looking documentary."

=== Accolades ===
Year	Organizations	Category	Nominee(s)	Result
2020	DocAviv Film Festival	Panorama Award	Tania Cypriano	Nominated
2020	Hong Kong International Film Festival	Golden Firebird Award - Documentary	Born to Be	Nominated
2020	Nashville Film Festival	Best Documentary Feature	Born to Be	Won
