= Global Peace and Unity =

Islamic festival and conference in London, England, the United Kingdom

- Status: Active
- Genre: Conference
- Dates: Third week of an Autumn month
- Begins: Saturday
- Ends: Sunday
- Venue: ExCeL Exhibition Centre
- Locations: Royal Victoria Dock, London, England
- Country: United Kingdom
- Years active: 2005–present
- Inaugurated: 2005
- Most recent: 2013
- Attendance: Over 50,000
- Organiser: Islam Channel
- Website: www.theglobalunity.com

The Global Peace and Unity (often abbreviated as GPU) is a recurring two-day event/festival and conference held at the ExCeL Exhibition Centre in Royal Victoria Dock, London, England and organized by the Islam Channel. It is the largest Muslim, interfaith and multicultural event of its kind in Europe. There have been six conferences since its inception. The first was on 4 December 2005, with others in 2006, 2007, 2008, 2010 and 2013. The 2006 event attracted over 55,000 visitors from five continents. The conference includes an Islamic exhibition, an evening nasheed concert, as well as a series of talks, workshops, seminars and lectures from international speakers over two days.

The aim of the events, according to the organisers, is to bring together people from all spheres of the British society to inform and educate them about Islam and Muslims, and through this help to bridge the gaps between Muslims and non-Muslims and improve community relations.

== Purpose ==
According to the official website, GPU events are designed to promote "global cohesion across all communities," as well as "break barriers and build bridges between the variety of cultures and groups that follow the Islamic faith." As well as giving Muslims the opportunity to enjoy themselves and provide a platform for them to learn more about their religion. The event aspires to spread peace and foster unity between like-minded representatives of communities in the United Kingdom and worldwide.

According to Khurram Mujtaba, director of operations of Islam Channel, "the event is a means through which to promote dialogue." According to Mohamed Ali Harrath, chairman of the event and Islam Channel’s CEO, "the event offers a crucial platform for demanding change through peaceful interfaith dialogue, and positive exchange of ideas and interaction towards fostering mutual understanding between people from every culture, faith and background in a bid for greater community cohesion in a multicultural society."

== Features ==
The event consists of three main parts. One is an exhibition which houses numerous stalls, selling Islamic gifts and serving cuisines emanating from a variety of cultures. Other stalls promote Islamic business, while yet others are reserved for the collection of charity donations for organizations like Muslim Aid and Islamic Relief. The other two parts of the event are composed of an evening concert on the first day and series of talks and lectures by international speakers on the second. Throughout both days artists provide entertainment on-stage in the form of nasheed pieces or comedy sketches.

== Speakers, artists and performers ==
Numerous individuals have spoken at the Global Peace and Unity event, including political figures and community leaders. Guest speakers have included:

- Mohamed Ali Harrath, Islam Channel's CEO
- Yusuf Estes, Islamic preacher from Texas
- Dawud Wharnsby, Muslim poet and singer/songwriter from Canada, along with Idris Phillips (2006)
- Native Deen, Muslim band from Washington DC
- Brother Dash, Muslim poet from the United States
- Salma Yaqoob, British Councillor
- Imran Khan, politician and former Pakistani cricket captain
- Zakir Naik, Indian Muslim preacher
- Yasir Qadhi, Muslim activist from America
- Nick Clegg, Member of Parliament for Sheffield Hallam
- Iqbal Sacranie, former Chairman of the Muslim Council of Britain
- George Galloway, Respect MP
- Richard Faulkner, Baron Faulkner of Worcester
- Qazi Hussain Ahmed, Pakistani politician
- Saeed Anwar, former Pakistani cricketer
- Simon Hughes, British MP
- Joel Hayward, British defence strategist and scholar, author and poet
- Muhammad Tahir-ul-Qadri, Pakistani scholar and founder of Minhaj-ul-Quran International
- James Caan, entrepreneur and founder of the James Caan Foundation
- Ken Livingstone, former (and then serving) Mayor of London
- Sarah Joseph, editor, Emel magazine
- Tariq Suwaidan, Muslim Brotherhood leader.

Other guests were former MCB Secretary-General Muhammad Abdul Bari; journalists Yvonne Ridley and Sarah Joseph; politicians such as Lord Nazir Ahmed, Lord Charles Falconer, Salma Yaqoob, Simon Hughes MP, Sadiq Khan MP, Stephen Timms MP and Shahid Malik MP; political activist John Rees, entrepreneur James Caan; ex-sportsmen Saeed Anwar and Imran Khan.

Islamic scholars and preachers who have spoken at the Global Peace and Unity event have included Zakir Naik, Yasir Qadhi, Yusuf Estes, Jamal Badawi, Timothy Winter, Joel Hayward, Abdul Wahid Pedersen, Muhammad Tahir-ul-Qadri, Muhammad al-Yaqoubi and Tariq Ramadan. Representatives from other faiths including Yisroel Dovid Weiss and Riah Abu El-Assal.

Muslim pop singers who have performed at the Global Peace and Unity event include Jermaine Jackson and Yusuf Islam. Nasheed artists to have performed include Zain Bhikha, Ahmed Bukhatir, Junaid Jamshed, Najam Sheraz, Dawud Wharnsby Ali, Idris Phillips, Native Deen and Outlandish. Other performers have included poet Brother Dash; comedians Preacher Moss, Azhar Usman and Baba Ali. Live performances by Muslim entertainers Zain Bhikha, Ahmed Bukhatir, Jamal Uddin Marcell & The Fletcher Valve Drummers, Junaid Jamshed and Najam Sheraz have also been given.

== Controversy ==
In 2010, United Kingdom Prime Minister David Cameron banned Baroness Sayeeda Warsi from attending the conference over alleged extremist speakers. Speakers have included: former Pakistani government minister, Muhammad Ijaz-ul-Haq, who said suicide attacks were a justified response to Salman Rushdie's 2007 knighthood. Shady al-Suleiman, who invited Anwar al-Awlaki to speak at a mosque in Australia and supports stoning adulterers. Abdur Rashid Turabi, head of Pakistan's Jamaat-e-Islami party. Sheikh Yasir Qadhi, who said that homosexuality is an "aberration against God". Hussein Ye, who blamed Jews for the September 11 attacks.

== See also ==
- A Common Word Between Us and You
- Amman Message
- MuslimFest
- Interfaith dialog
- Islamic humour
- Islamic music
- Dawah
- Islam in the United Kingdom
- Ummah
