= MuslimFest =

Cultural festival in Mississauga, Ontario

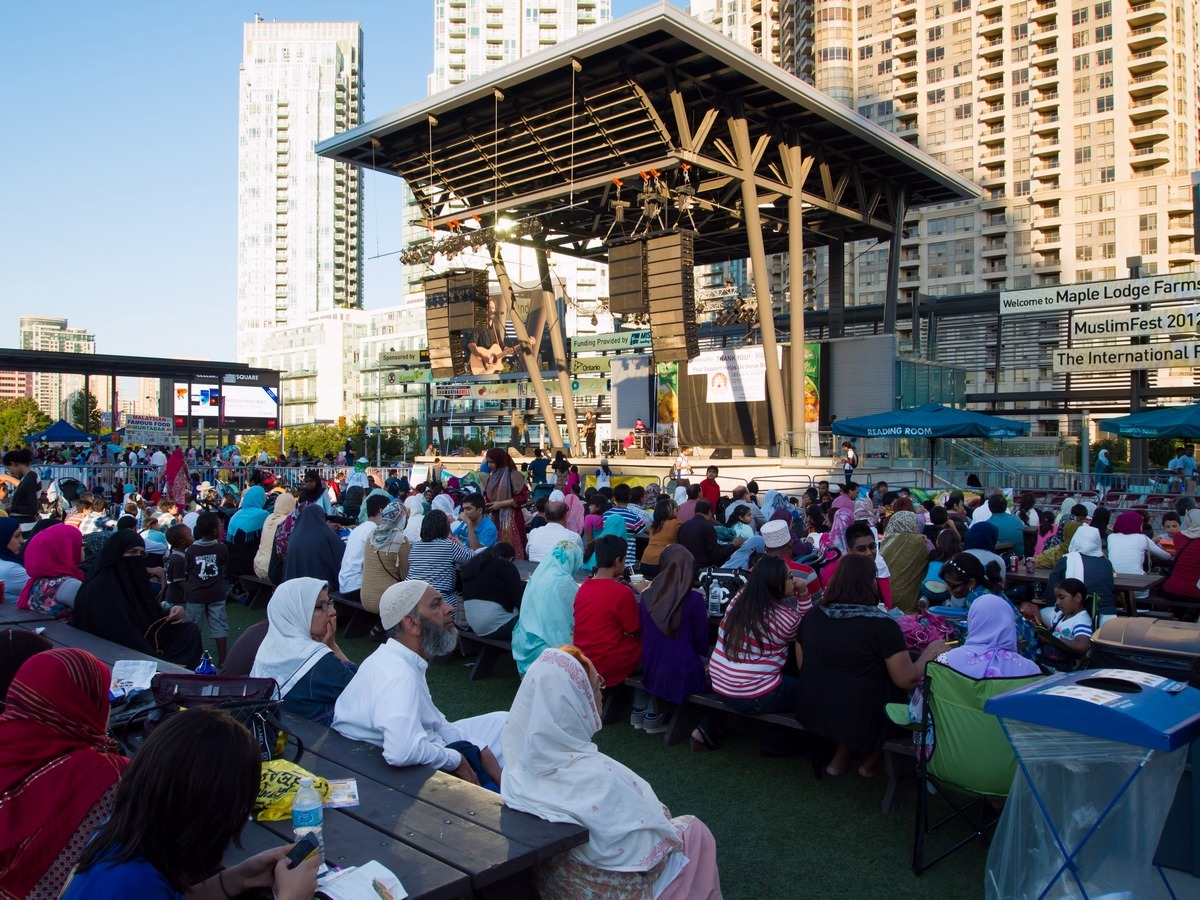
- MuslimFest 2012
- Genre: Cultural festival
- Dates: Jul 7–9, 2023
- Locations: Celebration Square, Mississauga, Ontario, Canada
- Years active: 2004–present
- Attendance: 70,000
- Organiser: Tariq Syed
- Website: muslimfest.com

MuslimFest is an annual three-day festival that celebrates Muslim Art, Culture, and Entertainment. The event showcases Muslim artists, musicians, and comedians, and takes place every summer in Mississauga, Ontario.

General features of the event include several educational workshops, a variety show, puppet show, programs geared towards women, and an international bazaar. Programs held during the day have typically consisted of an international art exhibit, film competition, and fashion show. A performance finale at the end of the final day typically includes spoken word artists, Muslim musicians and nasheed artists, and a comedy show.

== About ==
Launched in 2004, MuslimFest is an annual cultural festival that brings together Muslims from all over Canada, and even the US. MuslimFest has played a large role in encouraging arts and entertainment as well as showcasing the diversity of Islamic culture and identity.

MuslimFest is organized by a team of volunteers, high-school students are encouraged to volunteer to get their community hours and also learn new skills.

== Past Performers and Artists ==
- Maher Zain
- Humood AlKhudher
- Amal Kassir
- Waseem Badami
- Faisal Salah
- Khaled Siddiq
- Mustaqeem
- Yahya Hawwa
- Boonaa Mohamed
- Junaid Jamshed
- Dawud Wharnsby
- Saleem Hameed
- Idris Phillips
- Zain Bhikha
- Khaleel Muhammad
- The Fletcher Valve Drummers
- Irfan Makki
- Ilyas Mao
- Preacher Moss, of Allah Made Me Funny fame
- Amir Sulaiman
- Native Deen
- seven8six (786 Boyz)
- Baba Ali
- Aman Ali
- The Sound of Reason
- Sofia Baig
- Azhar Usman of Allah Made Me Funny fame
- Rasul Somji
- Mo Amer, of Allah Made Me Funny fame
- Azeem Muhammad, formerly of Allah Made Me Funny fame
- Mezba Mahtab
- Brother Dash
- Adam Saleh

== See also ==
- Global Peace and Unity
