= Omar Regan =

American comedian

- Born: Omar Laquon Regan; June 12, 1975 (age 51); Detroit, Michigan, United States

Comedy career
- Years active: 1999–present
- Medium: Stand-up, Film
- Genres: Observational comedy, Impressions, Musical comedy, Documentary, Sketch comedy
- Subject: Islamic humour
- Website: www.omarregan.com

Omar Laquon Regan (born June 12, 1975) is an American stand-up comedian, actor and former musician.

== Early life ==
Regan was born in Detroit, Michigan, United States and was raised in Highland Park, Michigan to African American parents. Regan did not know his biological father. When he was five years old, his mother, Toya Monet Regan (born 1952), converted to Islam from Christianity, and married Iman Lufman Ayman Abdullahi (born Christopher Thomas in 1956). Subsequently, Regan was raised as a Muslim.

== Music career ==
Regan started his career as a musician and started writing songs at the age of nine. He formed the group S.O.A (Servants of Allah) with his brother at the age of 11 and performed their first show at the age of 12. They opened for artists including Redman, Method Man, Wu-Tang Clan, KRS-One, Royce da 5'9", Proof, and Eminem.

In 1999, they were offered a single record deal with Tommy Boy Records but turned it down in hope of a better contract. However, no deal was made and the brothers focused on solo careers.

== Stand up career ==
At the age of 19, Regan moved to Los Angeles to pursue a career in stand-up comedy and acting. In November 1999, while auditioning for different film roles, he first performed stand-up comedy at local Detroit comedy clubs.

In 2005, Regan was on the main stage at The World Famous Comedy Store in Hollywood and got the attention of talents scouts, soon after he appeared on E!'s reality series, Fight for Fame. He won and signed a year theatrical contract with Hollywood agency ACME Talent Agency. The new show did not get picked up for a second season and a year later and Regan was representing himself once again.

He is a regular performer in "FUNATICAL: Taking Comedy to the Extreme's We Come in Peace" tour. He has performed stand up at events across the world including the Global Peace and Unity Event in London, MuslimFest in Ontario, and Mercy Mission's Twins of Faith Conference.

== Acting career ==
Regan is most known for doubling Chris Tucker in Rush Hour 2. He has since appeared in films including Internet Dating and Life is Hot in Cracktown.

He also co-founded a production company called BaniAdam Productions.

In 2015, he starred alongside Baba Ali in the film American Sharia as part of his Halalywood project.

== Other activities ==
Regan is a member of the Canadian Dawah Association as a Program Developer for Celebrity Relations.

Regan also works as a motivational and public speaker, delivering his talk entitled "From Hollywood To Hajj". He visits schools and conducts family counseling and marriage workshops.

== Comedy style ==
The Islamic World International Conference states that Regan uses entertainment and humor to promote tolerance and diversity, and aims to build bridges across racial, religious, and social divides.

== Personal life ==
Regan got married at the age of 17 and got married again at the age of 19, he has three children from his first two marriages. At the age of 20, Regan divorced both his wives. In 1999, Regan left Detroit for California. Regan described this "as a very hard and an expensive move and slept at Grand Central bus station for some nights or sometimes there were friends in the same acting boat as me, so they would share their floor with me." He raised his three children alone for four and a half years in a one bedroom apartment in Hollywood.

Since 2003, Regan has lived in Los Angeles, California. In December 2007 and 2008, Regan performed Hajj (the largest Islamic pilgrimage to Mecca, Saudi Arabia).

On October 28, 2009, Regan's step-father Imam Luqman Ameen Abdullah, 53, Imam and prayer leader of Masjid Al-Haqq in Detroit, was shot twenty times and killed during an FBI raid of a warehouse in Dearborn, Michigan. Along with 10 other men, he was suspected of charges that included conspiracy to sell stolen goods, illegal possession and sale of firearms, mail fraud and altering numbers on license plates. Regan publicly denounced the government's actions.

== Filmography ==
Year	Title	Role	Notes
2007	Black Superman	Carl	
2008	Internet Dating	Ben	
2009	Life Is Hot in Cracktown	Cremont	
2011	Strongmen	Alex Ross	
2013	Five Thirteen	Omar	
2014	Crossroads	Cat Daddy	
2014	American Sharia	Mohammed	

== See also ==
- African American
- Islamic humour
- Lists of African Americans
- List of American Muslims
