= Not Afraid to Stand Alone =

- Artwork by Zak Elyazgi

Studio album by Native Deen
- Released: November 2007
- Recorded: Omega Recording Studios in Maryland, Washington, D.C, United States
- Genre: Islamic; Nasheed; hip hop; R&B; soul
- Length: 75:14
- Language: English; Arabic
- Label: Native Deen LLC
- Producer: Abdul-Malik Ahmad

Native Deen chronology
Deen You Know (2005)	Not Afraid to Stand Alone (2007)	The Remedy (2011)

Not Afraid to Stand Alone is the second studio album by American hip hop group Native Deen, released in November 2007 by Native Deen LLC.

== Composition and release ==
Not Afraid to Stand Alone was released in November 2007. The album features fusion, R&B and hip hop, and throughout the album percussion instruments are solely used. A voice only version of the album was released.

The group incorporated a wider range of sounds and themes. The album features themes of praising Allah, hardships of being a Muslim, being steadfast in practicing Islam, fearing Allah, value of life, importance of prayer, about Prophet Muhammad, Dawah (calling others to Islam), Hajj (largest Islamic pilgrimage to Mecca), having trust in Allah and being proud of being a Muslim. The most notable change to their previous album is possibly the introduction of South African style singing, as well as more brooding examinations of the discrimination frequently faced by Muslims living in America.

== Track listing ==
All lyrics are written by Native Deen, except "Still Strong" (written by Joshua Salaam, Islam B and Omar Shah) and "Rain Song" (written by Naeem Muhammad, Nadia Afghani and Linda Douglas Gcwensa).

No.	Title	Length
1.	"Subhan Allah"	3:12
2.	"Interlude" (Muallim Abdullah from WNDJ)	0:36
3.	"Stand Alone"	4:06
4.	"Lord Is Watching"	4:04
5.	"Still Strong" (featuring Islam B from Outlandish)	1:20
6.	"Life's Worth"	4:38
7.	"Sea of Forgiveness"	4:10
8.	"Interlude" (Muallim Abdullah featuring Siraj Wahhaj)	2:27
9.	"Pray Before..."	4:34
10.	"Interlude" (Muallim Abdullah featuring Ingrid Mattson)	1:48
11.	"Tala'al Badru"	3:59
12.	"The Message"	4:19
13.	"Hold the Line"	3:56
14.	"Labayk"	2:22
15.	"Eid Morning"	2:22
16.	"Rain Song"	4:49
17.	"Interlude" (Muallim Abdullah featuring Rami Nashashibi)	2:30
18.	"Beat At The Top"	5:20
19.	"Zamilooni" (featuring Zain Bhikha)	6:13
20.	"Interlude" (Muallim Abdullah featuring Native Deen)	2:36
21.	"M-U-S-L-I-M"	4:49
Total length:		75:14
