= Rateb =

Rateb or Ratib may refer to:

== Religion ==
- Hizb Rateb, a collective recitation of Quran in Sufism
- Rifaʽi Ratib, an Islamic ritual

== Surname ==
Notable people with the surname include:

- Abu Bakr Ratib (born 1896), Egyptian fencer
- Abu Ratib (born 1962), Syrian singer
- Ahmed Rateb (1949–2016), Egyptian actor
- Aisha Rateb (1928–2013), Egyptian lawyer, politician, diplomat and academic
- Gamil Ratib (1926–2018), Egyptian actor
- Hassan Rateb, Egyptian businessman
- James Ratib, Malaysian politician
- Saleh Rateb (born 1994), Jordanian footballer

== Given name ==
- Mohammed Rateb al-Nabulsi (born 1939), Syrian writer
