= Baba Ali =

Iranian-born American film developer

- علی اردکانی
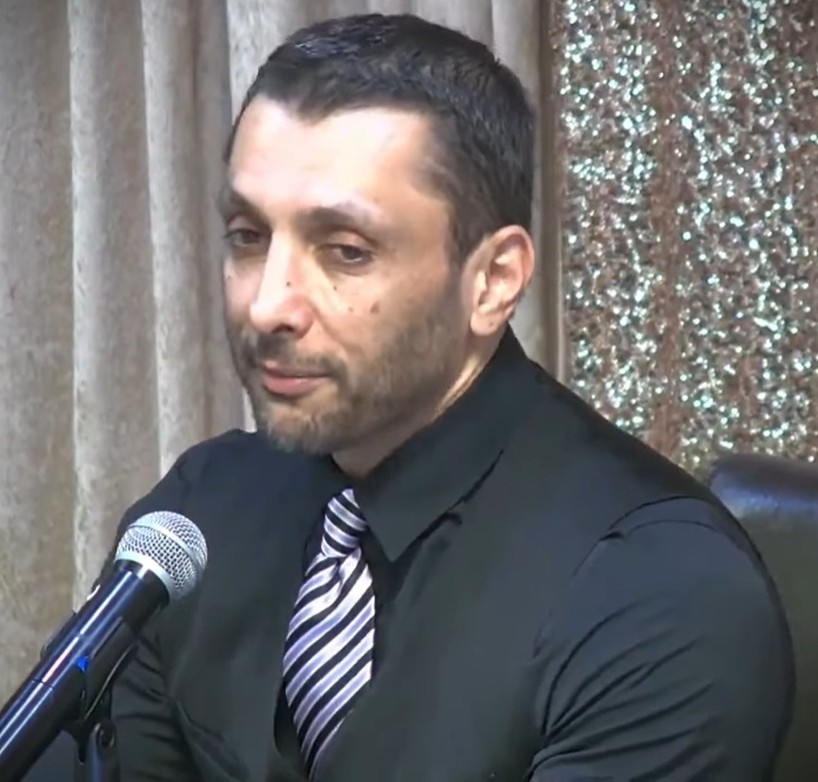
- Ardekani in 2024
- Born: Ali Ardekani; October 11, 1974 (age 52); Tehran, Iran

Comedy career
- Years active: 2006–present
- Medium: Video blog, stand-up
- Genres: Observational comedy; Social satire; Naseeha
- Subjects: Islamic humour; culture; marriage; Islam in the United States; human interaction

YouTube information
- Channel: realbabaali
- Years active: 2006–present
- Genres: Vlogs; comedy; commentary
- Subscribers: 78.8 thousand
- Views: 22.2 million
- Last updated: June 21, 2026
- Website: www.babaali.com

Ali Ardekani (Persian: علی اردکانی; born October 11, 1974), best known by his stage name Baba Ali (Persian: بابا علی), is an Iranian-born American comedian, board game developer, businessman, and actor.

== Early life ==
Although born into a Persian family from Ardakan, Ardekani was raised in a secular irreligious household in Los Angeles. From the age of 18 he studied many religions including wicca. At the age of 20, Ardekani converted to Islam after attending an Islamic camp. He belonged to a wealthy family who did not accept his conversion to Islam and subsequently disinherited him.

== Career ==
Ardekani worked in the IT field in California. He and Mahdi Ahmad founded Ummah Films, a Muslim film company which provides Halal (Islamically permissible) entertainment to Muslims and non-Muslims. In 2006, Ardekani rose to prominence within the online Muslim community with Ummah Films, which discusses various Islamic topics using humor. The company has produced several web series, including The Reminder Series and Ask Baba Ali. Ardekani has appeared on the Islam Channel and he has become a frequent guest at various Muslim conferences and events including the ICNA-MAS convention, Evening of Inspiration, the Global Peace and Unity Event and MuslimFest.

Ardekani has also designed two board games. In 2005, he designed Mecca to Medina, a board game about trading and negotiating with an Islamic-theme that can be played by all religions. Seven people invested $18,000 and made a 24% profit. In 2010, he designed Kalimaat, a word game in the same genre as Taboo, about common knowledge and memory. In 2011, Ardekani founded the Muslim matrimonial website Half Our Deen.

Ardekani has traveled the world doing stand-up to a wide range of Muslim and non-Muslim audiences. He has performed over 400 events across the world including the United States, United Kingdom, and Canada for audiences as large as 40,000. His work has been reviewed in The New York Times, USA Today and Los Angeles Times as well as featuring in seven episodes of DirecTV's The Fizz News. In 2015, he starred alongside Omar Regan in the comedy film American Sharia.

== Personal life ==
In 2001, Ardekani was married. He lives in Los Angeles with his wife and two children. His studio is the second bedroom of the apartment.

== See also ==
- Islamic humour
- Iranian American
- List of Iranian Americans
