= Brother Dash =

- Also known as: Brother Dash
- Born: Dasham K Brookins; December 3, 1971 (age 54); Brooklyn, New York, United States
- Origin: New York City, New York, United States
- Genre: Spoken Word
- Occupations: Poet, writer and photographer
- Instrument: Vocals
- Years active: 2003–present
- Label: Independent
- Website: BrotherDash.com

Brother Dash (born Dasham K. Brookins; December 3, 1971 in Brooklyn, New York, United States) is an American Muslim spoken word artist, essayist and photographer.

== Career ==
Brother Dash has performed and spoken at innumerable venues for both Muslim and non-Muslim audiences, including the Isna convention, the MSA National convention, EidFest!, Global Peace and Unity Event in London, MuslimFest in Toronto, and many universities, including Yale, Columbia, Rutgers, Cambridge and Drew. He has been featured on and performed for many media outlets, including the BBC Radio 4’s documentary "Sing Your Own Psalms", WBAI, WTOR, Islam Channel, and Al-Arabiya TV.

Brother Dash is the founder of the arts-based non-profit organization I Inspire, inc., which "provides comfort, inspiration and empowerment through the arts."

== Discography ==
=== Solo ===
- Spoken Soul (2009)
- Poetically Speaking: Savory Spoken Word...Spiritually Served (2007)
- The MuslimPoet EP (2005)

=== Collaborations ===
- Rhyme and Reason, The Poets of Metaphorical Records (2003)

=== Guest appearances ===
- The Adventures of Hakim 2 Khaleel Muhammad (2008)
- Ilâhî Suhail Najmi (2008)
