= Idris Phillips =

American musician (1958–2022)

- Born: Phillip Bubel; January 1958; Salt Lake City, U.S.
- Died: July 16, 2022 (aged 64)
- Genres: Modern folk, jazz, world
- Occupations: Musician, composer, arranger, producer
- Instruments: Piano, keyboards, guitar, bass, percussion
- Years active: 1977–2022
- Label: Enter Into Peace
- Website: www.idrisphillips.com

Idris Phillips (January 1958 – July 16, 2022) was an American musician, composer, songwriter, and music producer based in Nashville.

In recent years, he has been best recognized for his work as a pianist, guitarist and producer for Canadian singer-songwriter Dawud Wharnsby, co-writing the songs "War", "Eight Years Old", and "Let It Go" on Wharnsby's 2007 album, Out Seeing The Fields. The two artists toured together regularly as a duo worldwide and were at work on several collaborative recording projects.

== Early career ==
Born Phillip Bubel in Salt Lake City, United States, Phillips began playing classical guitar as a child and by his teens was also an accomplished pianist.

Phillips found himself as a session player in a recording studio for the first time at the age of 16. Shortly thereafter, his composition and arranging skills piqued the interests of record label executives who saw the talented and handsome young prodigy as a possible candidate for investment. Music industry politics and pressures pushed Phillips and his music out on the road, where live performances earned him his reputation as a versatile and skillful player, opening for other popular jazz performers including Mose Allison and crossing backstage circles with artists such as Richie Havens and Livingston Taylor.

Touring throughout the United States during the mid-1980s as a member of several jazz ensembles and rock bands, Phillips made his home in Phoenix, Arizona.

In 1989, he embraced Islam and became known as Idris Phillips – Idris being the Qur'anic form of the name Enoch.

Taking a break from cross country tours, Phillips worked briefly in the early 1990s as a hotel entertainment booking agent in Phoenix. He eventually found himself back on the road again, touring the U.S. and parts of Western Canada until the late 1990s when he settled outside Hollywood, California, to work as a session musician and composer for film and television music libraries.

In 2009, Phillips re-located to Nashville, Tennessee, living and working more closely with his son Matthew Bubel, an active session musician in Nashville.

== Career as Idris Phillips ==
Since becoming formally and professionally known as Idris Phillips in 2005, the writer/performer has recently found recognition worldwide for his melodic compositions which blend varying musical styles (jazz, pop, new-age) with diverse instrumentation. Beyond his work as a composer for Hollywood music libraries, to the growing independent film industry of the Middle East, Phillips' music was used to underscore the Egyptian documentary, The Fog Is Lifting, and acted as the theme music for the Islam Channel program "Hayyat".

Phillips returned to live performance in June 2006, reaching out to international audiences alongside Canadian folk/world-music artist Dawud Wharnsby at a concert in Kuala Lumpur, Malaysia (performing alongside South African singer-songwriter Zain Bhikha and Malaysian a cappella group Raihan). The concert also aired in Malaysia on the national holiday of Eid ul Fitr in November 2006.

In November 2006, Phillips and Wharnsby also toured the United Kingdom with Canadian percussionists The Fletcher Valve Drummers, concluding their tour of UK with a brief performance of their song "War" at the Global Peace and Unity Event held at ExCeL London, to an audience watching various acts and speakers throughout the weekend of over 20,000. The event was televised via satellite by England's Islam Channel throughout Europe and North Africa.

As the lawfulness of "musical instruments" has long been a debate among teachers and students of the Islamic faith, Phillips' rendition of "War" – with guitar – at the Global Peace and Unity event marked the first time in British history that a Muslim musician appeared on stage with a stringed instrument at a major mainstream Islamic religious conference. His performance challenged stereotypes that "music" is "categorically unlawful" according to some Islamic theological teachings, warming the audience and the stage for world-renowned singer-songwriter and peace activist Yusuf Islam (Cat Stevens) who performed immediately afterward, also with guitar.

In 2009, Phillips toured as percussionist with South African singer/songwriter Zain Bhikha in the United States and the Netherlands.

== Death ==
Phillips died on July 16, 2022, at the age of 64.
