= Deen You Know =

Studio album by Native Deen
- Released: April 2005
- Genre: Islamic; Nasheed; hip hop
- Length: 50:33
- Language: English; Arabic
- Label: Jamal Records
- Producer: Craig Marius

Native Deen chronology
| Deen You Know (2005) | Not Afraid to Stand Alone (2007) |

Deen You Know is the debut studio album by American hip hop group Native Deen, released in April 2005 by Jamal Records.

== Composition and release ==
Deen You Know was released in April 2005. It conveys the message of Islam in a contemporary style. The songs have a social and moral message to inspire others.

The group adopted a musically thin texture. Although a few of tracks incorporate xylophone, most of the songs rely solely on drums and vocal harmonization. The drums are often pitched to add a melodic quality. The album features themes of encouraging good deeds, importance having good intentions, virtues of seeking repentance, the life of the Islamic prophets, preparations for the hereafter, hardships of life, negative effects of intoxicants and the blessings of Allah.

== Track listing ==
| No. | Title | Lyrics | Length |
|---|---|---|---|
| 1. | "Alhamdullilah" | | 3:13 |
| 2. | "Deen You Know" | Joshua Salaam | 4:48 |
| 3. | "Dedication" | Naeem Muhammad | 3:37 |
| 4. | "Intentions '05" | Abdul-Malik Ahmad, Naeem Muhammad | 7:46 |
| 5. | "Small Deeds" | Abdul-Malik Ahmad | 3:40 |
| 6. | "Looking Glass" | Naeem Muhammad | 3:40 |
| 7. | "For the Prophets" | Joshua Salaam, Abdul-Malik Ahmad, Naeem Muhammad | 5:19 |
| 8. | "Paradise" | Joshua Salaam | 5:38 |
| 9. | "Test" | Abdul-Malik Ahmad | 4:38 |
| 10. | "Drug Free '05" | Joshua Salaam | 4:30 |
| 11. | "Sakina" | Abdul-Malik Ahmad | 3:23 |
| Total length: | | | 50:22 |
