= Mercy Mission (disambiguation) =

Mercy Mission may refer to:

- Mercy Mission
- Mercy Mission: The Rescue of Flight 771
- "Mercy Mission" (Star Wars: The Clone Wars)
