= The Remedy (Native Deen album) =

Studio album by Native Deen
- Released: July 1, 2011
- Genre: Islamic; Nasheed; hip hop; R&B; soul
- Length: 59:39
- Language: English; Arabic
- Label: Jamal Records

Native Deen chronology
Not Afraid to Stand Alone (2007)	The Remedy (2011)

The Remedy is the third studio album by American hip hop group Native Deen, released on July 1, 2011 by Jamal Records.

== Composition and release ==
The Remedy was released on July 1, 2011.

The album features percussion instruments and synthetic sounds, no wind or string instruments are used. In 2012, a voice only version of the album was released.

== Track listing ==
No.	Title	Length
1.	"Bismillah"	3:05
2.	"Only Fear Allah"	4:34
3.	"Mercy to Mankind"	5:24
4.	"Packed at All"	3:16
5.	"Greatest One"	3:27
6.	"My Faith My Voice"	4:18
7.	"The Remedy"	3:01
8.	"Ahad (The Story of Bilal)"	4:43
9.	"Hungry Ones"	2:59
10.	"Ramadan Is Here"	3:20
11.	"Ya Taybah"	3:12
12.	"Gaza"	4:23
13.	"My Lord"	5:01
14.	"I Am Near"	4:08
15.	"Our Earth"	4:48
Total length:		59:39
