= Hassan Ghani =

Scottish broadcast journalist and filmmaker

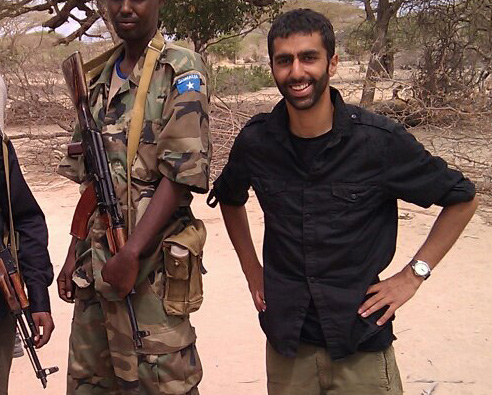
Hassan Ghani

Hassan Ghani (born 1985) is a Scottish broadcast journalist and documentary filmmaker, based in London. He has worked in Afghanistan, Pakistan, Gaza, Somalia, Turkey and Egypt during the uprising. He has been imprisoned twice by Israel during the course of his work.

He was on board the international flotilla bound for Gaza in May 2010 which was boarded by the Israel Defense Forces. His earlier news reports from the ship had warned of an impending bloody confrontation, and he reported live as Israeli soldiers boarded the Mavi Marmara Turkish ship.

== Biography ==
He was born and grew up in Glasgow to parents of Pakistani descent in 1985, and studied at the University of Stirling in Scotland, where his degree course specialised in documentary production.

From June 2006 to January 2009, he was employed as a reporter and documentary filmmaker at the Islam Channel in London, and regularly presented the channel's daily news bulletin. He then joined Press TV as an international correspondent for three years, leaving in February 2012. In March 2012 he began working for the US based 'The Real News Network', reporting from the UK, Turkey and Pakistan.

He now reports for Al Jazeera English.

== Recent films ==
His work includes the 2007 documentary The Silent Prisoners filmed in Pakistan, and the 2006 documentary film Miles Beyond.

In November 2008 he and British journalist Yvonne Ridley travelled to Afghanistan to produce a documentary about female prisoners being held by the United States military. "In Search of Prisoner 650" was commissioned by Press TV. During the making of the film the two came under fire amid a clash between the Taliban and Afghan police on the road to Ghazni. The drama was caught on camera and featured in the film. The documentary was broadcast worldwide on Press TV in April 2009, and received a nomination in Aljazeera's documentary film festival 2010.

In December 2009 and January 2010 he followed this up by travelling with another Viva Palestina convoy to Gaza (again as Press TV correspondent) and produced a documentary series, detailing the trials and tribulations of trying to get an international convoy into Gaza across three continents, entitled 'Lifeline to Gaza: The Return'.

== Israeli attack on Gaza aid flotilla ==
On 31 May 2010 Ghani was involved in the Gaza Freedom Flotilla, when the Israel Defense Forces attacked an international aid flotilla bound for the Gaza Strip, killing several activists and wounding others.

We are being hit by tear gas, stun grenades, we have a navy ship on either side and helicopters overhead. We are being attacked from every single side and this is in international waters, not in Israeli waters.

Later that day his father Haq Ghani spoke at a rally in George Square in Glasgow in protest at the attack. He was deported to Turkey. He talked to BBC Radio Scotlands "Good Morning Scotland" from Turkey, that people:

used sticks, chairs, anything to stop these soldiers who were coming down with machine guns and tasers and firing rubber bullets and later on using live ammunition on civilians. We knew Israel would do some sort of action, but we thought they would perhaps just try to scare us and then allow us through. We didn't expect a ship with 32 different nationalities on board, with aid from 50 different countries on board, would be attacked in such a brutal manner.

He was also on board the Canadian boat, the Tahrir, which attempted to break the siege as part of 'Freedom Waves to Gaza' in November 2011. He was interned by Israel a second time for a week, under the charge of attempting to illegally enter Israeli territory, after the Tahrir and the Saoirse boats were intercepted by the Israeli military. His detention was prolonged after he refused to sign documents accepting the charge, stating that he was a journalist covering a political news story and had no intention of entering Israel, but was taken there by force by the Israeli military.

== Awards and nominations ==
In 2008 Ghani was one of five nominated by Channel 4's 4Talent scheme for its journalism award in the UK, and in October 2008 he was awarded 'Young Scottish Muslim of the Year' by Scotland's First Minister Alex Salmond for his work in journalism and documentary. His work 'In Search of Prisoner 650' was nominated for an award in Aljazeera's documentary film festival 2010.
