= Wharnsby =

Wharnsby is a surname. Notable people with the surname include:

- David Wharnsby (born 1967), Canadian film editor
- Dawud Wharnsby (born 1972), Canadian singer-songwriter
