= American Sharia =

- Directed by: Omar Regan
- Written by: Omar Regan
- Produced by: Couni Young; Micah Brandt
- Starring: Omar Regan; Baba Ali; Eric Roberts
- Cinematography: Keith DeCristo
- Edited by: Brad Geiszler
- Music by: Jeff Bass
- Production companies: Halalywood Entertainment; UFO Pictures; Boot Strapped Films
- Distributed by: Halalywood Entertainment
- Release date: February 11, 2015 (United States)
- Running time: 98 minutes
- Country: United States
- Language: English

American Sharia is a 2015 American independent buddy cop action comedy-drama film directed by Omar Regan and starring Omar Regan, Baba Ali and Eric Roberts. Written by Omar Regan, the film is about rogue government officials using Islamophobia to maintain power while two Muslim police officers attempt to solve a case involving the disappearance of several Muslims.

== Plot ==
Officer Richardson (Eric Roberts) profiles every Muslim he sees as a terrorist. He goes on an arrest frenzy, which makes the community activists, Jihad (Adam Saleh) and Osama (Sheikh Akbar) take to the streets and rally the people to stand up for their rights.

The Chief of Police (Joshua Salaam) wants to gain the trust of the Muslim community in order to get re-elected, but Attorney Leila Rodriguez (Yasemin Kanar) is standing in the way with a discrimination lawsuit against Officer Richardson and the Motor City Police Department. The Chief calls, Mohammed (Omar Regan) who keeps his faith to himself and his own prejudices against Islam, following constant exposure to Islamophobia, and partners him with a Middle Eastern, Detective Abdul (Baba Ali), who proudly shows his religious values. Together, they have to solve a case involving the disappearance of several Muslims as well as a respectable Muslim leader who is charged with an assault arrest. The Chief wants them to "Speak Muslim To The Muslims" which he thinks will guarantee his re-election and results in ending rising Islamophobic tensions between the police and the community.

== Cast ==
- Omar Regan as Mohammed
- Baba Ali as Abdul
- Eric Roberts as Officer Richardson
- Joshua Salaam as Police Chief
- Yasemin Kanar as Attorney Leila Rodriguez
- Adam Saleh as Jihad
- Sheikh Akbar as Osama
- Jaime Zevallos as Officer Jose

== Production ==
=== Development and pre-production ===
Omar Regan is the director, producer and writer of American Sharia, and it is the first production under his company Halalywood Entertainment. In 2012, Regan wrote the story and it then took about two years to get the film project started. Before production for the film even began, Regan created a two-minute trailer in hope of selling the project to investors. In December 2013, the campaign for the film was launched, Regan used Kickstarter to generate funds for the film and the film earned $122,000 in donations in less than 40 days. The film cost £124,000 to make.

In February 2015, Regan told Asian World News "I had some life experience which really affected me. In 2009, the government killed my father. He was Muslim and they said he wanted to establish Sharia in America. They shot him 20 times! He was the victim of Islamaphobia. He's gone and there was no way to defend himself. Later, they put a small clip on the news confirming he really wasn't a terrorist. I didn't want to make a hate film in response to that, but instead to re-educate the public. I want to focus on changing the mindset of people- so they don't automatically look and judge. There are over 1 billion Muslims worldwide, so why is it that everyone is painted with the same brush?"

Billed as "the first ever Halal Comedy/Action feature film of its kind," American Sharia is a buddy-cop comedy-drama film starring Detroit-born comedian Omar Regan and Iranian American comedian Baba Ali. The two actors play Muslim cops from completely opposite backgrounds, who band together to fight crime in Detroit and learn a few things about religion, culture and stereotypes along the way. The film aims to be humorous and respect the boundaries of Islam.

=== Filming and post-production ===
American Sharia is a Hollywood motion picture that sets out to use comedy to reverse the prejudices held against Islam and help promote the religion in a more positive way. It's an alternative form of entertainment, during a time where we are surrounded and exposited to increasing negativity and profanity."

—Omar Regan, writer, director and star of American Sharia

In February 2015, Regan told Asian Image, "American Sharia is a Hollywood motion picture that sets out to use comedy to reverse the prejudices held against Islam and help promote the religion in a more positive way. It's an alternative form of entertainment, during a time where we are surrounded and exposited to increasing negativity and profanity."

When the project became financially secure, Regan decided to bring the production to the diverse communities of Metro Detroit. The film crew is composed of people from diverse backgrounds, religions and ethnicities.

City officials in Dearborn Heights were lenient regarding the production of the film, allowing the cast and crew to shoot at several prime locations, including at the Berwyn Senior Citizen Center. Scenes were also shot at the Alsadek Market on Warren Avenue in Dearborn and in and around Downtown Detroit. At the end of June 2014, the production of the film completed in Dearborn Heights after a month-long shoot around Metro Detroit that employed dozens of Muslims and Arab Americans from California, New York and Michigan. On the last day of production at the Berwyn Senior Citizen Center, more than 100 extras turned out, many dressed in Islamic attire, to shoot a scene depicting a homeless shelter being raided by the police.

In February 2015, Regan told Asian Image, "American Sharia is a Hollywood motion picture that sets out to use comedy to reverse the prejudices held against Islam and help promote the religion in a more positive way. It's an alternative form of entertainment, during a time where we are surrounded and exposited to increasing negativity and profanity." Whilst speaking with Asian Sunday Newspaper he added, "...The message of the film is that we all need love and unity because we all are the creation of Allah."

== Release ==
Between February and March 2015, British charity Penny Appeal are due to exclusively host the UK screenings of American Sharia at specially selected venues in 22 cities. The film is due to be released in Malaysia, Qatar, Dubai, Canada and the United States.

The exclusive film tour helped the British Muslim community raise £1 million to help vulnerable orphans in Bangladesh, The Gambia, India, Pakistan, Palestine and Sudan.

== Reception ==
Aneesa Malik of Asian World News said of the film "action packed comedy that's a sure fire way to tickle your funny bone... It explores real-life situations where Muslims are mistakenly seen to be 'radicalised' and uses comedy to defy such assumptions." The Asian Today called the film "an action comedy that lifts the curtain on real Muslim lives." Urban Asian called it a "hilarious new film". Desi News called it a "family-friendly film".

Aalia Khan the Asian Sunday Newspaper rated the film 1/5 and said, "...the cheesy comedy and stiff acting paved the way for this movie to be a much hyped let down... On the other hand it was a good effort in trying to shed light on some of the misunderstandings surrounding Islam." Steve Bennett of Chortle said, "This limited circuit is probably where American Sharia will stay, as it's hard to see the movie to making a mainstream crossover."

== See also ==
- Islamic humour
- Islam in the United States
