= Tunisian Islamic Front =

Tunisian organization

According to American counter-terrorism analysts the Tunisian Islamic Front is a group with ties to terrorism.

== History ==
According to the Journal of the Middle Eastern Review of International Affairs, the Tunisian Islamic Group was founded by Rashid al-Ghannushi, who had previously founded the Nahda movement. The article discussed why radical Muslim groups don't agree to join in coalition governments. It stated that. in 1998, when it was published, Rashid al-Ghannushi was in exile in the United Kingdom.

== Security concerns ==
The United States State Department reported the Tunisian Islamic Front claimed credit for murdering four policemen, and had warned all foreigners to leave Tunisia:

In May the extremist Tunisian Islamic Front (FIT) issued a warning that all foreigners in Tunisia should leave, but it did not follow up with any concrete threats or attacks. The group also claimed responsibility for a number of operations in Tunisia, including the murders of four policemen. Tunisian authorities have not confirmed or denied the claims.

There are allegations that the FIT is working in conjunction with the Algerian Armed Islamic Group (GIA), and that its members may be training in GIA camps. Several Tunisians were taken into custody in 1995 for alleged involvement with the GIA network in Europe. The FIT claimed responsibility for an attack in February against a Tunisian border post on the Tunisia-Algeria border in which seven border guards were killed, but some officials blame the GIA possibly in conjunction with the FIT for the attack. As of 31 December, there were no similar incidents.

The Summary of Evidence memo prepared for Guantanamo captive Riyad Bil Mohammed Tahir Nasseri's first annual Administrative Review Board, on 27 April 2005 stated:

- The detainee is also a known member of the Tunisian Islamic Front (TIF).
- The Tunisian Islamic Front (FIT) is suspected to be the armed wing of En-Nahda.

The Summary of Evidence prepared for Riyad Bil Mohammed Tahir Nasseri's second annual Administrative Review Board on 4 August 2006 stated:

- A foreign government has identified the detainee as a known member of the Tunisian Islamic Front.
- According to a foreign government agency, it is suspected that Tunisian Islamic Front is the armed wing of En-Nahda. Members of the Tunisian Islamic Front have a range of contacts within the Islamic movement and would be in close contact with other Islamic extremists.

The Jamestown Foundation called the group "shadowy", and its strength "uncertain".

== Alleged members and alleged associates ==
Mohamed Ali Harrath is the Secretary General of the Tunisian Islamic Front. He is also the Director General of the British satellite television station, the Islam Channel.

Alleged members and alleged associates of the Tunisian Islamic Front
isn	name	notes
721	Abdullah al-Hajji Ben Amor	Convicted, in absentia, of membership in the group in 1995.; He was transferred from extrajudicial detention in Guantanamo in July 2007, after the USA accepted Tunisian promises that he would not be abused after repatriation.
