= Imad Rami =

Imad Rami عماد رامي
- Born: Imad Shakhashiro; October 29, 1962 (age 63); Damascus, Syria
- Genres: Arabic; Islamic; Nasheed
- Occupation: Singer
- Instrument: Vocals
- Years active: 1991-Present

Imad Rami (عماد رامي) (born Imad Mowafaq Shakhashiro عماد موفق شخاشيرو on October 29, 1962), is a Syrian Nasheed singer well known for his iconic Islamic music. He first became known through his debut album Hama Qalbi (هام قلبي My Heart Longs) in 1991 and has produced various albums since.

== Biography ==
Imad Rami was born in Damascus, Syria to a family of talented artists. His father is Mowafaq Shakhashiro, who also has been his main co-songwriter throughout his career. His mother is the daughter of Islamic Nasheed pioneer Musallam Bitar. Rami is known for his beats and vocal strength. His songs range from spiritual to wedding genre. He has performed at concerts at events across the world, including in Damascus and other Syrian cities. He was invited several times to Lebanon to sing at one of the biggest castles of UNESCO, then in Sayda, Tripoli, Jordan, Saudi Arabia, Algeria, Cairo, United States, and United Kingdom.

== See also ==
- Syrian people
- Music of Syria
