= Mohamed Ali Harrath =

Tunisian Muslim activist and founder of Islam Channel

- Born: 20 February 1963 (age 63); Sidi Bouzid, Tunisia
- Education: SOAS, University of London
- Known for: Islam Channel CEO; Tunisian Activist

Mohamed Ali Harrath (born 20 February 1963), is a Tunisian activist, businessman and the founder and CEO of the Islam Channel.

== Biography ==
=== Adult life ===
After his release in the mid-1980s, he travelled to Tehran, inspired by the thought of the Iranian Revolution, though he was disappointed by the reality of life there. He helped found the Tunisian Islamic Front (FIT) in 1986: though he has characterised the organization as a non-violent political party in opposition to Ben Ali's dictatorship, the Tunisian regime, under Ben Ali, characterized it as advocating "an Islamic state by means of armed revolutionary violence".

He was forced into exile from Tunisia, and at the Tunisian Government's request was placed on an Interpol Red Notice in 1992. He entered England in October 1995, and claimed political asylum. In October 2000 he was granted refugee status and indefinite leave to stay in the UK.

He founded the Islam Channel in 2004 and is the current CEO. He also organised the first Global Peace and Unity event in 2005, attracting over 50,000 members of the public annually. In 2010, he travelled to Kigali, Rwanda, where he met and awarded President Paul Kagame for his services to humanity.

In February 2011 he returned to Tunisia after 21 years of exile, where he was welcomed by many Tunisians at Tunis-Carthage International Airport.

Harrath won £140,000 in libel damages after a website owned by Stand For Peace Ltd claimed that Harrath was a convicted terrorist. In 2025 he invested in the Tribune Media Group.
