= Yvonne Ridley =

British journalist (born 1958)

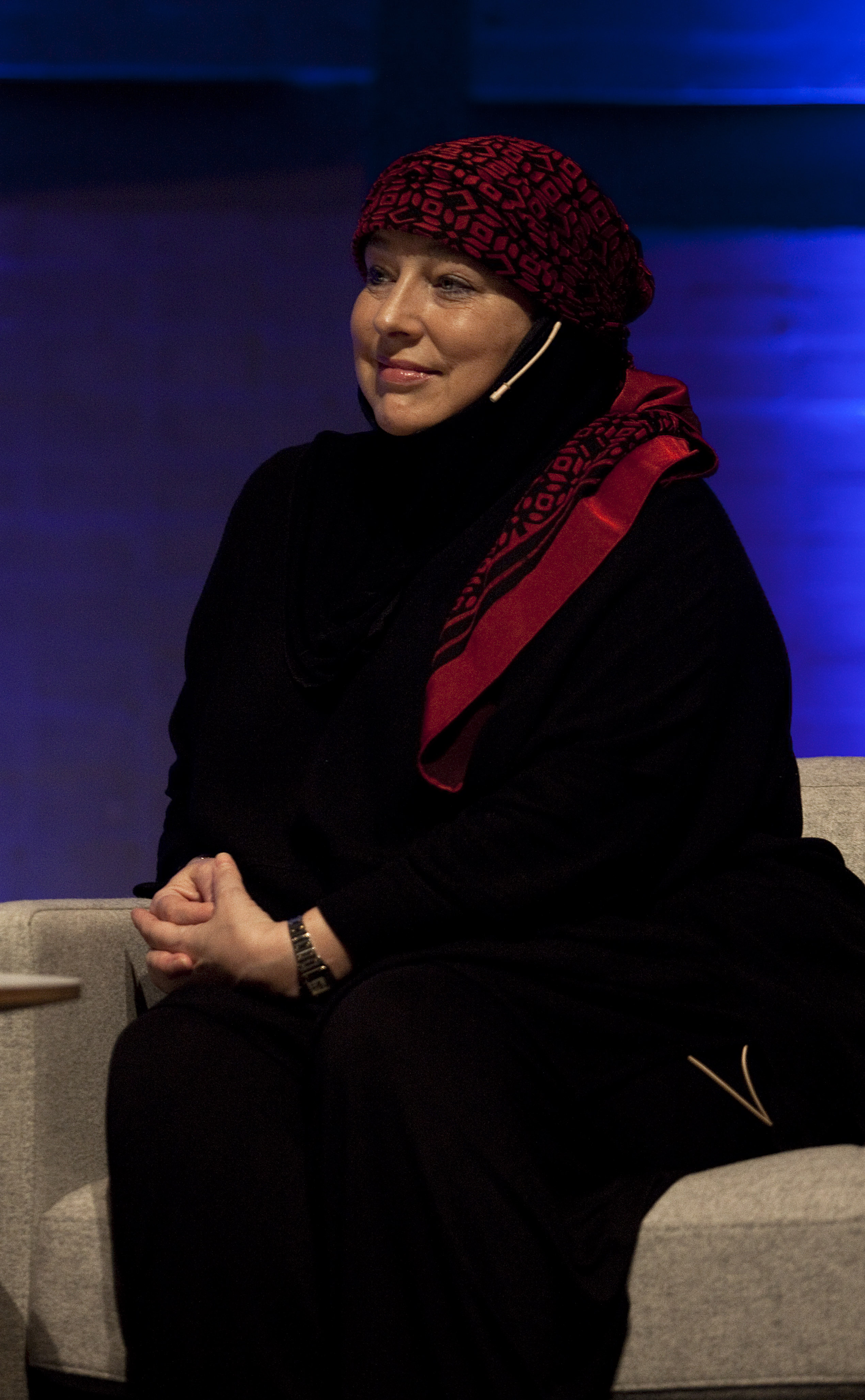
- Ridley in 2010
- Born: 23 April 1958 (age 68); Consett, County Durham, England
- Occupations: Journalist, author, and politician
- Political party: Workers Party of Britain (since 2025)
- Other political affiliations: Independent (2024); Alba Party (2021–2024); Scottish National Party (2016–2021); Respect Party (2004–2012); Labour Party (until 2003)
- Website: yvonneridley.org

Yvonne Ridley (born 23 April 1958) is a British journalist, author and politician. She was a former chair of the National Council of the now-defunct Respect Party.

Ridley made global headlines when she was captured by the Taliban and held for 11 days in 2001 after the events of 9/11 and before the start of the U.S.-led war. Two years later she converted to Islam. She is a vocal supporter of the Palestinian movement, which she took up as a schoolgirl in her native County Durham. She is an avid critic of Zionism and of Western media portrayals and foreign policy in the war on terror, and has undertaken speaking tours throughout the Muslim world as well as America, Europe and Australia.

She has been called "something close to a celebrity in the Islamic world" by the journalist Rachel Cooke, and in 2008 Ridley said that she had been voted the "most recognisable woman in the Islamic world" by Islam Online.

== Biography ==
Ridley was born in the working class mining town of Stanley, County Durham, the youngest of three girls, and had an upbringing in the Church of England. She began her career at the local Stanley News, which was part of the Durham Advertiser Series. From there she moved to Newcastle upon Tyne and worked for The Sunday Sun and the Newcastle Journal for Thomson Regional Newspapers as well as The Northern Echo which was part of the Westminster Press group. She attended the London College of Printing. As a journalist, she was employed by The Sunday Times, The Independent on Sunday, The Observer, the Daily Mirror and the News of the World. She was deputy editor and acting editor of Wales on Sunday, and was chief reporter when the Sunday Express sent her to Afghanistan after 9/11.

In one interview she mentions having "a reputation as the 'Patsy Stone of Fleet Street'" that she was happy to have left behind with her conversion to Islam. Her passion for left-wing, anti-imperialist causes predates her conversion; she joined the Labour Party as a teenager before resigning over the decision to invade Iraq in March 2003.

=== Capture by the Taliban ===
Ridley was arrested by the Taliban in Afghanistan on 28 September 2001, and held for 11 days, while working for the Sunday Express.:

In the days before the beginning of the US-led invasion of Afghanistan, after being refused an entrance visa, she decided to follow the example of BBC reporter John Simpson, who had crossed the border anonymously in a burqa.

She entered on 26 September and spent two days undercover in Afghanistan. It was on her return, travelling with her guides, that she was uncovered when the donkey she was on bolted, and her camera was seen by a Taliban soldier. She was accused of being a spy, which carried a death sentence, and at the very least faced jail for illegally entering Afghanistan.

The publisher of Express Newspapers, Richard Desmond, sent a team of negotiators to talk directly with Taliban officials at the Afghan embassy in Islamabad, Pakistan. It soon became clear the regime wanted neither money nor aid but proof that Ridley was a bonafide journalist. The British high commissioner to Pakistan, Hilary Synnott, met the Afghan ambassador in Islamabad, Mullah Abdul Salam Zaeef, and asked for her release. Following her release on 8 October, Ridley was escorted to the border, where she was handed over to the Pakistani authorities. It had been feared that this would be jeopardised by the bombing of Afghan targets as part of the War in Afghanistan that had commenced the previous day.

Ridley revealed that she had kept a concealed diary inside a box for a toothpaste tube and inside of a soap wrapper. She had been on hunger strike throughout her captivity and described her experience as terrifying but she was not physically hurt.

After her release, her guides Jan Ali and Nagibullah Muhmand, as well as the latter's five-year-old daughter Basmena, were held in prison in Kabul. At least three of Muhmand's relatives were also arrested for aiding Ridley after the Taliban developed the film in her camera. All were subsequently released without charge or harm.

=== Conversion to Islam ===
She said in her book, In the Hands of the Taliban, that, while she was in captivity, she was treated with respect by the men of the Taliban and was, subsequently, amazed by their courtesy. All men that she came in contact with lowered their gazes (to her), which left her bewildered. She had initially thought they had already decided to have her executed and therefore could not look her in the eyes. Only later did she discover they were showing her a sign of respect. While in captivity she gave an undertaking to read the Qur'an and study Islam if they let her go. Fulfilling the promise and setting out on what she described as "an academic exercise" she said she was shocked to discover "the Quran makes it clear that women are equal in spirituality, worth, and education. What everyone forgets is that Islam is perfect; people are not."

She converted to Islam in the middle of 2003, claiming that her new faith helped put behind her broken marriages and embrace "the biggest and the best family in the world."

=== Subsequent career ===
After her conversion, she delivered lectures on issues relating to Iraq, Israel, Afghanistan, Chechnya, Kashmir, Uzbekistan, women in Islam, the war on terror, and journalism at universities across the US, Australia, South Africa and the Middle East. She has authored and contributed towards a number of books called In The Hands of the Taliban and Ticket to Paradise. A later book entitled Torture: Does It Work was published by Military Press Studies in 2016. In 2019 she authored the book The Rise of the Prophet Muhammad: Don't Shoot the Messenger published by academic house Cambridge Scholars Publishing.

Ridley was a patron of the UK-based pressure groups Cageprisoners until December 2014, the European President of the International Muslim Women's Union, and the Secretary General of the European Muslim League based in Milan and Geneva. She is a member of the Stop the War Coalition, for which she has spoken at its rallies, and was a member of the Respect Party, for which she stood in parliamentary elections before resigning both leadership and from the party in early 2014.

==== Writing, speaking and advocacy ====
In December 2001, Ridley's memoir In the Hands of the Taliban was published, which includes an account of the 10 days she was held captive. In it, she expressed worries that officers from Mossad, the Israeli secret service, or from other intelligence agencies, were plotting to have her killed in an effort to boost public support for the war in Afghanistan, having been shown incriminating documents by a journalist for the Arabic channel, Al Jazeera.

Ridley left her job with Express Newspapers, and announced she would return to Afghanistan to work on a sequel to her book. The sequel has not yet materialised, although she produced a programme for BBC Radio Four called The Return. This was after she returned in 2002 and then the following year as part of a travel feature for The Observer with her daughter Daisy.

Ridley was employed in 2003 by the Qatar-based media organisation Al Jazeera, where, as a senior editor, she helped launch their English-language website. In November of that year she was dismissed because Al Jazeera found her "overly-vocal and argumentative style" was incompatible with the station's programme. Her termination of her employment was also attributed to her campaigning for journalists' rights on the Al Jazeera English channel and website. She brought a case for unfair dismissal against the organisation, winning that case and the subsequent appeals which took four years. She was awarded 100,000 Qatari riyals, which equated to around £14,000. In December 2003, she released a novel, Ticket to Paradise, based on the backdrop of 9/11.

She began presenting The Agenda With Yvonne Ridley, the Islam Channel's politics and current affairs programme, in October 2005. In 2007, the Islam Channel was fined £30,000 by Ofcom after a series of breaches relating to her show and another show. She resigned in April 2007, complaining that she had effectively been dismissed after relations between her and the channel's CEO, Mohamed Ali Harrath, broke down. She brought another case of unfair dismissal and sex discrimination. In April 2008, Ridley again won her case and was awarded £26,000 damages against the Islam Channel.

Ridley is a freelance journalist and presenter, and for several years regularly worked for Press TV, the Iranian English-language 24-hour news channel. She hosted a weekly current affairs and politics show called The Agenda. She also wrote a column for the now-closed Daily Muslims, an online newspaper for North American Muslims. It was in this paper that an obituary calling Chechen militant Islamist Shamil Basayev a shaheed, a Muslim honorific for "martyr", was published.

In May 2008, in an assignment for Press TV, she and the film-maker David Miller shot a documentary on the Guantanamo Bay detention camp where they filmed on-site and also interviewed former inmates. Their film Guantanamo: Inside the Wire was nominated in the 2009 Roma Film Fest in Italy, and in the 2010 Aljazeera International Documentary Film Festival in Qatar. Another film made in 2009 was also nominated in the 2010 Aljazeera festival; In Search of Prisoner 650, directed by Hassan Ghani, claimed that Aafia Siddiqui was held prisoner in secret by the US.

In 2008, Ridley interviewed Gazan Prime Minister and Hamas leader Ismael Haniyeh for Press TV. In early 2009, Ridley helped organise and took part in the Viva Palestina convoy of around 100 vehicles bearing aid across North Africa to Gaza via the Rafah border.

In July 2009, in the wake of Press TV's coverage of the 2009 Iranian presidential election and the subsequent protests, Ridley and other journalists working for Press TV were accused of being stooges for the Iranian regime.

=== Election candidate ===
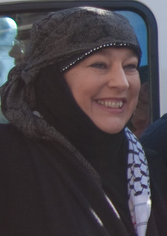
Ridley in 2009

Ridley was first on the Respect list for the 2004 European Elections for the North East England region, but was not elected; the party placed last with 1.1% of the vote. She stood for Respect in the Leicester South by-election in 2004, where she came fourth of eleven candidates, with 12.7% of the vote. When she stood there again in the 2005 general election, although she still placed fourth (of eight candidates), her share of the vote fell to 6.4%. In the 2006 Westminster City Council election, she stood unsuccessfully for a seat in the Church Street ward.

In the 2012 Rotherham by-election, held on 29 November, Ridley was the Respect Party candidate. Respect Yourself, a leaflet distributed during the campaign which accused the Labour Party of racism, was attributed by Labour to Respect. Labour reported the matter to the police and the returning officer. Respect put the incident down to "dirty tricks"; the leaflet was without the legally required notice identifying the source. In the final result, Ridley came fourth of eleven candidates, with 1,778 votes or just over 8% of the total votes cast.

At the 2022 Scottish Borders Council election, Ridley was the Alba Party candidate in the Jedburgh and District ward. She received 53 first-preference votes (1.5%), finishing last.

Ridley stood as an independent candidate in Newcastle upon Tyne Central and West against Labour MP Chi Onwurah in the 2024 general election, coming fourth of seven candidates with 8.8% of the vote.

In 2025, Ridley announced that she stand for the Workers Party of Britain in Glasgow Cathcart and Pollok, at the 2026 Scottish Parliament election. Additionally, she was the lead candidate on the party list for Glasgow. On the constituency vote, Ridley took 586 votes (1.8%), placing her second-to-last. On the regional list, the Workers Party received 924 votes (0.4%), and did not pick up any seats.

== Views and opinions ==
Ridley has given vocal support for Muslim causes involving Palestine, Iraq, Afghanistan, Kashmir, Chechnya, Xinjiang and Uzbekistan at anti-war demonstrations.

She has been highly critical of Britain's foreign policy. In complaining of patriotic sentiments voiced by British Muslim pop star Sami Yusuf, and the enthusiasm for him shown by his Muslim fans, she has said:

How can anyone be proud to be British? Britain is the third most hated country in the world. The Union Jack is drenched in the blood of our brothers and sisters across Iraq, Afghanistan, and Palestine. Our history is steeped in the blood of colonialism, rooted in slavery, brutality, torture, and oppression.

During a February 2006 meeting at Imperial College London, Ridley described Israel as "that disgusting little watchdog of America that is festering in the Middle East" and said that Respect "is a Zionist-free party ... if there was any Zionism in the Respect Party they would be hunted down and kicked out. We have no time for Zionists," while both the Conservatives and Liberal Democrats were "riddled with Zionists." She described the British politician David Miliband, then foreign secretary (and Jewish), on her blog in 2008 as being "a gutless little weasel who lost more than his foreskin when he was circumcised?" Ridley has compared the Israeli Government to the Nazis and has argued that the Israeli Parliament "is on the path of reviving the policies of Adolf Hitler" and that Israeli politicians are "promoting a Final Solution for Gaza".

At the "Muslimer i Dialog" conference in Copenhagen in September 2005, Ridley was asked by Danish terror expert Lars Erslev Andersen if she saw it as a problem that militant Islamists distribute recruiting videos of Iraqi insurgents killing hostages. She replied that Muslims used the videos at home as an alternative form of news to what she perceived as the propaganda of Western media. At the same meeting, she compared British Prime Minister Tony Blair with Pol Pot. She returned to Copenhagen in May 2006 to take part in an Islam Channel conference on Islamophobia, where she urged Muslims not to "kneel before their enemies" or "kiss the hand that slaps them".

In a 2003 speech at IslamExpo, she protested the attention given honour killings and female genital mutilation by the media, which "have nothing to do with Islam". The idea that Islam oppresses women is the biggest obstacle to women accepting Islam, she argued. She herself had believed it, but in keeping her promise to her Taliban captors that she would read the Quran, she "realized I had been lied to", and converted. On the subject of the compulsory hijab, she said: "I was in Iran last year. I know the hijab is a pain for them, but they will get no sympathy from me. It is clear that the hijab is an obligation, not a choice."

Among her controversial opinions is that the Chechen terrorist leader and architect of the Beslan school massacre, Shamil Basayev, was a 'shaheed' i.e. Islamic martyr. When the family of Al-Qaeda leader Abu Musab Al-Zarqawi denounced him, Ridley declared this "cowardly" and said she would "rather put up with a brother like Abu Musab Al-Zarqawi any day than have a traitor or a sell-out for a father, son or grandfather".

At a meeting of Respect on 6 June 2006, following the Forest Gate raid, Ridley urged all Muslims in Britain to "boycott the police and refuse to co-operate with them in any way, shape or form until the boys are released", including "asking the community copper for directions to passing the time of day with a beat officer." Her comments were labelled as "sheer, undiluted madness" by Shadow Home Secretary David Davis, who added that "To not co-operate would be of no benefit to the Muslim community; no benefit to the police; and no benefit to the security of our country." Respect's only MP, George Galloway, quickly distanced himself from her comments, saying Ridley was wrong and, "Our policy is not that we should withdraw co-operation from the police". Ridley later said that she only wanted Muslim leaders, not the whole community, to stop co-operating.

Initially, Ridley said that she strongly opposed the Western intervention in the 2011 Libyan Civil War, and spoke in a rally opposing it held in central London where she likened asking for Western support to making a pact with the Devil. However, she later travelled to rebel-held territory, where she said that she became a wholehearted supporter of the Libyan rebels' cause and accepted that they had no choice but to ask for help from the West.

In 2012, she expressed her strong support for the end of secret evidence used in the SIAC case against the Jordanian Islamist cleric, Abu Qatada, and her opposition to Home Secretary Theresa May's plans to deport him on the basis of the secret evidence from the UK.

In February 2018, Ridley was invited to speak at the Oxford Union as part of a debate entitled "This House Believes We Cannot Thrive Without Religion". The invitation was criticised by the Oxford University Jewish Society, who released a statement which claimed that "Ms. Ridley has a long and detailed history of making exactly the sort of comments that cause Jewish students to feel targeted and unsafe on campus". She has been widely criticised as an antisemite.

In February 2025, Ridley appeared on Talk with journalist Julia Hartley-Brewer and stated that Hamas had shown "kindness" to the Israeli hostages they had kidnapped in the October 7, 2023 attack, only to have their efforts "backlashed" by the Israelis. In a heated exchange, Hartley-Brewer demanded "Are you kidding me? Do tell me what the acts of kindness were. The pita bread once every three days for those men kept in a tunnel for 16 months?" to which Ridley replied, "They gave [the hostages they released in February 2025] goody bags. I don't know what was in them, but they gave them gifts. They gave them little mementos, Palestinian mementos.” An astonished Hartley-Brewer called Ridley a "Hamas apologist" and said "Acts of kindness from your hostage-taker, the man who's kidnapped you and terrified you and starved you for months? Yvonne, what's happened to you?”

=== Denial of entry ===
In January 2013, Ridley was scheduled to attend the Spring of Islam Conference organised by the Jamaat-e-Islami Hind in Hyderabad, India. She was given all necessary clearances by the external affairs ministry, but was denied a visa at the last minute because of the tense situation in Hyderabad following the arrest of controversial local legislator Akbaruddin Owaisi a few days before the event was scheduled to take place. However Ridley, via video conference, addressed three sessions of girls, women and journalists during the conference.

=== Views on ISIL ===
Ridley said there is a clear difference between the ideologies of the Taliban and the Islamic State of Iraq and the Levant (ISIL, also called ISIS and Daesh), arguing that while the Taliban aims to form an Islamic state within the borders of Afghanistan, ISIL was working to create a border-less Islamic state and disregarded the sovereignty of other nations. She also claimed that ISIL recruited by promising financial supports and power, and the Taliban is largely run and supported by Afghan people. These were taken from her 2015 interview with Iranian newspaper Shargh. She wrote a damning chapter on the exploits of ISIL in her book The Rise of the Prophet Muhammad: Don't Shoot the Messenger. In 2013, Ridley offered to swap places with ISIL hostage David Haines, according to reports published later.

== Personal life ==
Ridley has been married five times. She first married when she was 22; her second marriage, to a policeman, lasted seven years; her third husband was Daoud Zaaroura, the CEO of North of England Refugee Service and a former PLO head of intelligence, whom she met in Cyprus, where she was working on an assignment for the Newcastle-based Sunday Sun, and they have one daughter, born in 1992; her fourth husband, to whom she was married until 1999, was an Israeli businessman, Ilan Hermosh; her fifth husband is an Algerian.

During her time on the Sunday Sun newsdesk, she told colleagues she was an officer in the Territorial Army, based on Teesside, specialising in intelligence. She had also told the same to colleagues on The Northern Echo and repeated it in interviews.

Ridley resides in Scotland, where she moved to in 2011, and was a Scottish National Party (SNP) member, largely in her newly-found desire to support and aid Scottish independence. She is also a feminist and a socialist. In 2021, Ridley confirmed that she had left the SNP and joined the Alba Party, primarily over her disagreement with SNP policy around gender recognition.

In January 2014, Ridley was nominated for the Muslim Woman of the Year award at the British Muslim Awards. She has worked with the non-governmental organisation Protect the Rohingya, when she helped a team of South African lawyers take statements of alleged war crimes from refugees who had fled Myanmar. She has also worked with Syrian women prisoners who were victims of torture and abuse while held by the Assad regime in Syria.

She was portrayed by Hattie Morahan in the film Official Secrets.

== Bibliography ==
- In the Hands of the Taliban by Yvonne Ridley (2001). ISBN 1861054955.
- Ticket to Paradise by Yvonne Ridley (2003). ISBN 1893302776
- Torture – Does it Work? Interrogation issues and effectiveness in the Global War on Terror (2016) ISBN 978-1782668305
- The Rise of the Prophet Muhammad: Don't Shoot the Messenger (2019) ISBN 978-1527521957
