= Mehwar TV =

Egyptian television channel

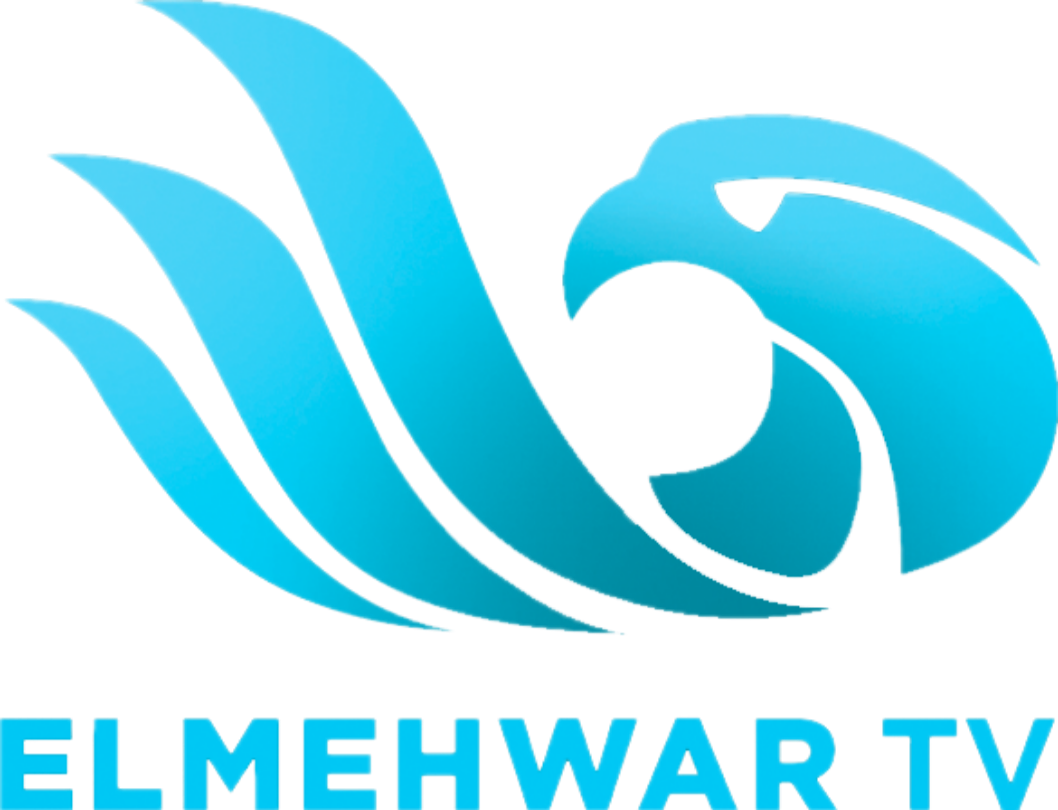
- Country: Egypt
- Broadcast area: Middle East and North Africa (main audience free-to-air)

Programming
- Language: Egyptian Arabic

Ownership
- Owner: Sama Group International Co.

History
- Launched: 2001
- Founder: Hassan Rateb

Mehwar TV (Arabic: قناة المحور) is an Egyptian TV channel based in Giza, Egypt. It covers current events, as well as broadcasting content on political and religious topics, and some entertainment programmes.

Launched in 2001, the channel has a particular focus on Egyptian topics. Its main owner and chairman is Hassan Rateb. The channel is part of Sama Group International.

== See also ==
- Television in Egypt
