= Billy Jonas =

American musician

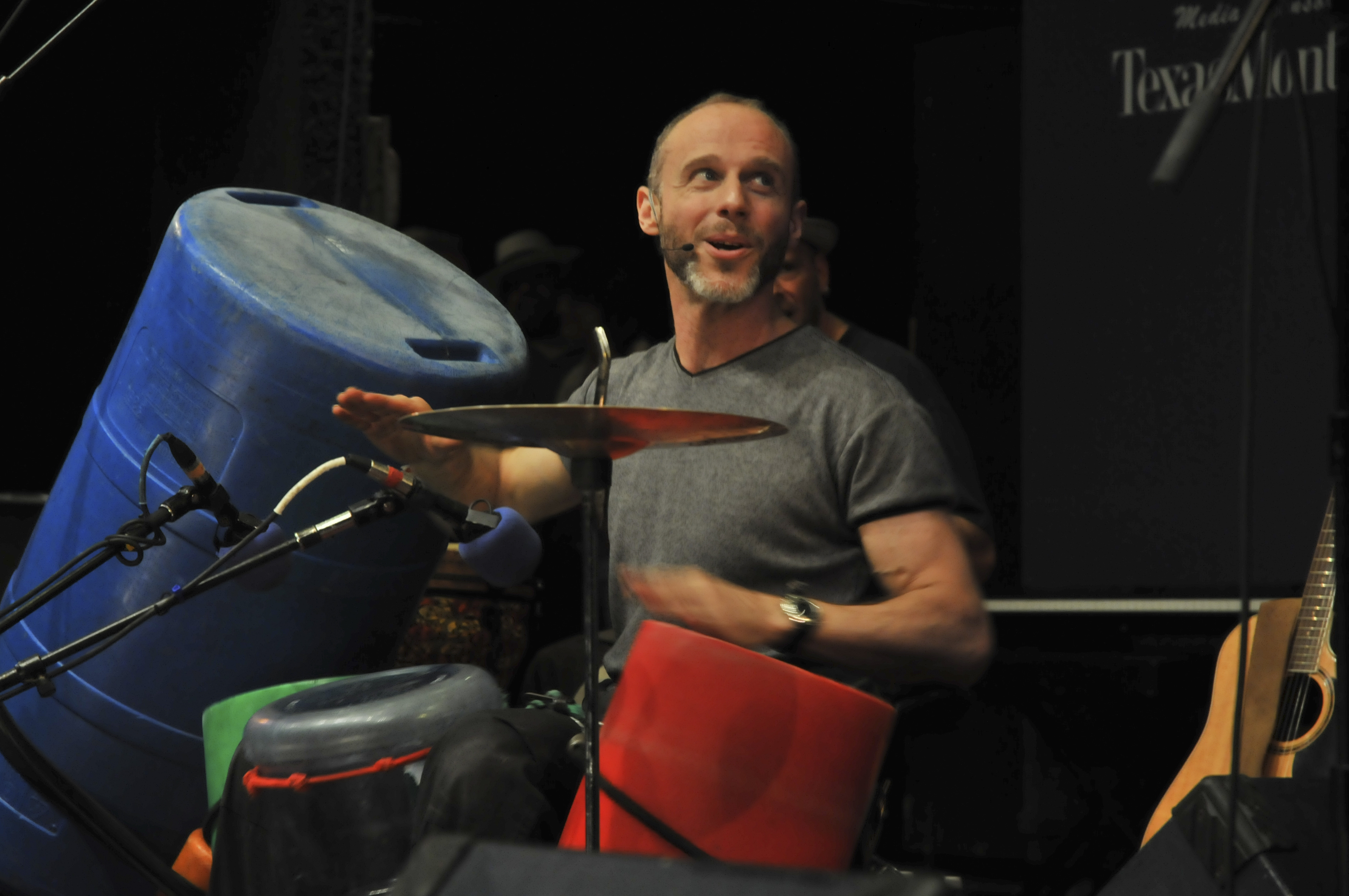
Jonas at the Kerrville Folk Festival in 2009

Billy Jonas of Asheville, North Carolina is a singer-songwriter, percussionist, multi-instrumentalist, and recording artist. He works as a performer and workshop facilitator with adult and general audiences, as well as family audiences and faith communities. He is a member of Congregation Beth HaTephila, where he is part of the Sacred Music Team. As a founding member of the folk music duo, "The Billys," and leader of The Billy Jonas Band, Jonas uses recyclable items as instruments. His show focuses on "Bridging Divides", using music to help heal rifts within ourselves, our families, our communities, and the world. Billy Jonas' 12 albums, PBS special, and 3 decades of live concerts have generated a following throughout North America.

== Career ==
In the 1980s, when attending Oberlin College, Jonas was a founding member of the Oberlin College Big Bang Theory performance art collective. In Chicago, he performed monthly "Bangalong with Billy" shows at the No Exit Cafe, and in the 1990s co-founded the "funky folk" duo The Billys with Bill Melanson. As a member of the duo "The Billys," he was featured at festivals and venues nationwide. Jonas shared stages with Patty Larkin, Ani DiFranco, David Wilcox, Richard Thompson, and Pete Seeger.

Jonas is a member of the interfaith band "Abraham Jam", a trio of internationally renowned musicians who have teamed up to create art strengthened by diversity. The band originally formed in 2010, and has since released "Abraham Jam Live" in 2018, and a studio album, "White Moon", in 2019. One track from this album, "Braided Prayer", was included in the 2024 Broadway production of Our Town at the Ethel Barrymore Theatre.

== Recognition ==
His CD What Kind of Cat are You? received a First Place/Gold from the American Federation of Independent Musicians and a Parents' Choice Gold Award. Jonas' videos have garnered multiple accolades, including Parents' Choice Awards and a New York Times "Best for Kids" listing. In 2010 Billy Jonas and the Billy Jonas Band were invited to perform at the White House Easter Egg Roll.

== Workshops ==
Jonas conducts workshops that focus on various components creating music. These include “foraged, found, and homemade instruments”, “songwriting”, “performance and presence”, “Neo-tribal hootenanny 101”, “teacher training”, and more.

Jonas also leads a summer music and creativity camp each year in Asheville, "Camp Bangin' & Sangin'!", for kids and adults, which "seeks to honor and nurture the creativity of each participant, regardless of previous skill, ability, or talent." Activities include singing, songwriting, body percussion, homemade instrument making, and learning to be comfortable onstage.

== Discography ==
For family audiences:

- Toot the Horn (2017)
- Build It Back Again (2014)
- Happy Accidents (2009)
- What Kind of Cat Are You?! (2002)

For general audiences:

- habayta (homeward) (2015)
- Get Real (2004)
- Billy Jonas Live (2002)
- Life So Far (2000)
- The Time Has Come (as The Billys) (1993)
- The Billys (as The Billys) (1991)

With "Abraham Jam":

- White Moon (2019)
- Abraham Jam Live (2018)

== DVD/VHS ==
- Everybody's in the Band DVD/VHS (2004)
- Bangin' and Sangin' DVD/VHS (2000)
