= Abu Ratib =

Abu Ratib أبو راتب
- Born: Mohamed Mustapha Ali Masfaka; 1962 (age 63–64); Aleppo, Syria
- Origin: Aleppo, Syria
- Genres: Islamic; Nasheed; Arabic
- Occupation: Singer
- Instruments: Vocals; violin; trumpet; drums
- Years active: 1981–present

Mohamed Mustapha Ali Masfaka (Arabic: محمد مصطفى علي مسفقة; born 1962), better known as Abu Ratib (أبو راتب), is a Syrian Nasheed singer of Islamic and Arabic music based on classical Arab poetry.

== Early life ==
Masfaka was born in Aleppo, Syria. From an early age, he was immersed in musical traditions of the Arab world. At a young age, he joined the Arab Music Institute in Aleppo, Syria where he studied musical notation (Solfège) and learned to play the violin.

Masfaka studied broadcasting and television direction in Amman, Jordan, and obtained experience in the broadcasting engineering.

== Career ==
As Masfaka balanced music with a growing interest in Islam, his work moved in a spiritual direction. He joined the band of the singer Abi Dujanah for religious singing, until he founded Al-Huda band in 1981 and began issuing the albums of Islamic singing. He also made nasheeds for the Syrian islamic uprising during this period. As a result, he was expelled from Syria by the Assad regime. In 1986, Al-Huda band developed to found Al-Huda Islamic Art. In 1991, he founded Al-Huda International Art Production.

Masfaka is an active member of the Arabic arts community and is involved in numerous organizations to promote Islamic music and artist development worldwide. He has traveled over the U.S and abroad as a featured artist at community events in mosques and on college campuses.

He is a member of Michigan-based Crescent Academy International, and aims to overcome negative impressions of Islam through his works such as a play about the Islam featuring the Islamic prophet Muhammad which attracted a large non-Muslim audience. He is also head of the World Islamic Art League.

Masfaka has often sung in support of human rights for the occupied Palestinian people.

== Awards ==
In 2006 Masfaka was awarded the World Youth Prize for Islamic Work in the field of Inshad (religious singing).

== Arrest, deportation and return ==
In 2010 he was arrested when he returned from Canada, due to his involvement with the Holy Land Foundation when the case of the holy land 5 concluded in 2008 with their imprisonment. Masfaka who pleaded guilty to making false statements during his naturalization proceedings, was later deported to the country of his choice.

After the fall of the Assad regime, he returned to Syria after 45 years of exile.

== See also ==
- Syrian people
- Music of Syria
