= Mohammad Lutfur Rahman =

Bengali poet

Mohammad Lutfur Rahman (1889–1936), a Bengali homeopathist and author, was born in Magura District.

== Early life and education ==
Mohammad Lutfur Rahman was born in 1889 to Sardar Muinuddin Ahmad and Shamsun Nahar in the village of Parnanduali in Magura, Jessore District, Bengal Presidency. He belonged to a Bengali family of Muslim Sardars hailing from the village of Hajiganj in Magura. Lutfur Rahman completed his entrance examination from Magura English High School in 1915, and later completed a degree in homeopathy from a specialist college in Krishnanagar, Nadia.

== Career ==
Lutfur Rahman was a teacher and afterwards went to Calcutta and established a helping house for women named, ‘Naritirtha’. He published a magazine named Narishakti. Later, Mohammad Lutfur Rahman became a homeopathic doctor.

== Writing career ==
His literary works were included in the curriculum of school level, secondary, higher secondary and graduation level Bengali literature in Bangladesh.

=== Self-development books ===
- Unnoto Jibon
- Manob Jibon
- Mohot Jibon
- Shotto Jibon
- Uccho Jibon
- Jubak Jibon
- Dharmo Jibon
- Cheleder Mohottokotha
- Musolman
- Mangal Vabishat
- Priti Upohar
- Bashor Upohar
- Raihan
- Pothohara
- Uddom o Porishrrom

=== Poetry ===
- Prokash

=== Translations ===
- Chotoder Karbala
- Don Quixote
