= Hassan Rateb =

Egyptian businessman

Hassan Rateb (Arabic: حسن راتب; born 23 February in Egypt) is an Egyptian businessman.

== Positions ==
- Sinai University, Chairman.
- Sama Group, Chairman.
- Sinai Cement Company, Chairman.
- Al Mehwar Satellite Channels, Chairman.
- Egyptian Company for Tourism and Entertainment Projects, Chairman.
- Sinai Foundation for Development, Chairman.
- Sama Social Development, Chairman.
- El Takafol Association, Vice President.
- Red Crescent Association in Giza, General Secretary.
- Suez Canal University, Board Member.
- High Committee for Social Development, Committee Member.
- The Egyptian Strategic Project for Regional Development of Sinai, General Coordinator.
- Egyptian Union of Industries - Cement Branch, President.

== Arrest ==
He was arrested on 28 June 2021 over accusations of funding illegal excavations for antiquities in Egypt. In April 2022, he was sentenced to 5 years in prison. He was released in June 2024.

== See also ==
- Mehwar TV
- Mehwar FM
