= Yahya Hawwa =

Syrian singer (born 1976)

Yahya Hawwa يحيى حوى
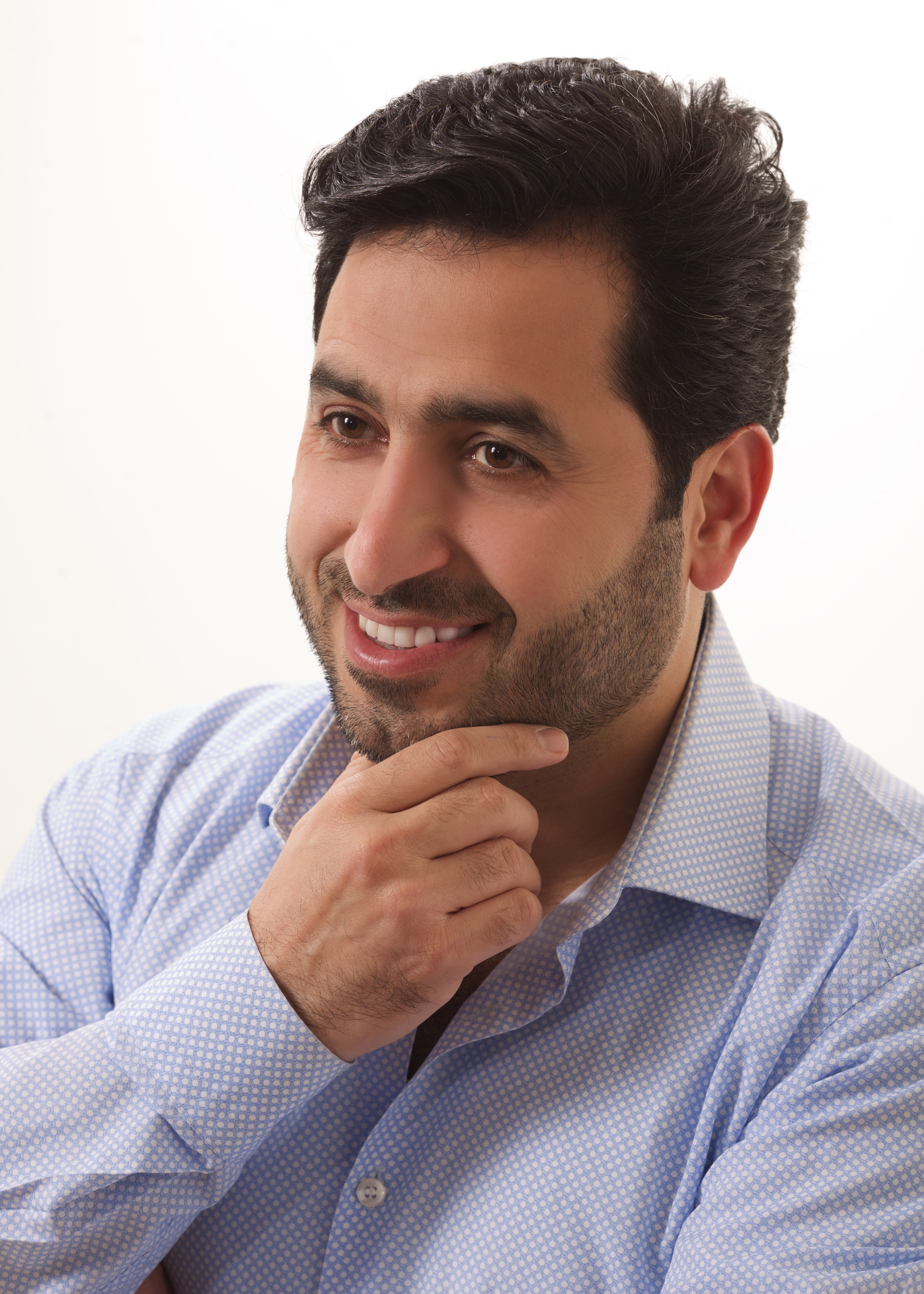

Background information
- Born: March 15, 1976 (age 49); Hama, Syria
- Origin: Syria
- Genres: Arabic; Islamic; Nasheed
- Occupations: Singer; Qāriʾ
- Instrument: Vocals
- Years active: 1996–present
- Website: www.yahyahawwa.com

Yahya Hawwa (born on 15 March 1976 in Hama, Syria) is a Syrian artist who started his artistic career in the early stages of his life. He memorised the Koran with an Ijazah (a connected chain of transmission to Muhammad) and holds a master's degree in psychology. He received an Oscar Award in the Cairo International Festival 2009–2010 in addition to the title of "the optimist" and "the artist of the Syrian revolution". He was also appointed as an ambassador for humanity in several charitable institutions around the world.

Yahya Hawwa has performed in hundreds of concerts around the world on social, religious, national, charitable and humanitarian occasions and has visited nearly 40 countries and more than 150 cities around the world. He has many songs, chants, video clips, and albums, in addition to that, he recorded a complete recitation of the Quran, dhikr and ruqya (Prophetic healing invocation). He has participated in multiple awareness campaigns and presented multiple TV programs. The artist Yahya Hawwa was able to make rapid strides in presenting artworks with deep educational and humanitarian ideas. He aims with his works to ingrain the positive values in community members while seeking to communicate with new groups by inviting them to engage in a social life full of optimism and happiness.

== Early life ==
He was born in the city of Hama, Syria in 1976. His father, Mahmoud Hawwa, was martyred in Hama when Yahya was five years old. His mother is Shaima Othman, from Baniyas, and he has (4) brothers and (6) sisters. In 1999 he married Lubaba Al Obaid, and they had children named Huda, Muhammad, Munir, Sami, and Adam.

Yahya Hawwa was raised in the Holy City, Makkah until he completed his secondary education, and he completed the memorization of the Noble Qur’an there at the hands of the Sheikh Farij Al-Harbi. He also studied Tajweed at the hands of a group of sheikhs, including Sheikh Muhammad Nabhan Al-Masry, Dr. Muhammad Mahmoud Hawa, Dr. Ahmed Al-Qudah, Sheikh Abu Salman Al-Abesi, Dr. Muhammad Saeed Hawwa, and finally Sheikh Khaled Al-Turk who gave him the Ijazah (chain of transmission of the Koran to Muhammad.).

== Career ==
Yahya Hawwa began his artistic career as a hobby in the second grade of primary school, and began his professional career with the release of the first album entitled "We have come to you" in 1996 AD. He began his artistic career under the Syrian poet Salim Abdel Qader (may God have mercy on him), who adamantly encouraged him to engage in this career as he admired his talent. He then met the Lebanese musician Khaled Junun, who provided him with essential artistic experience.

He studied the principles of oriental singing with his teacher Ahmad Zami and the Jordanian musician, Ayman Tayseer. He later studied under Dr. Amira Al-Nasser in Cairo. Hawwa's real breakthrough was in 2006 with his most famous song, "My whole life is for God", which was broadcast on many satellite channels. It has been translated into many languages, including English, Spanish, Malay (Malaysian), Turkish and Kurdish, which made it increase in popularity all over the world.

== Artistic titles ==
The artist, Yahya Hawwa, has received many titles throughout his artistic career including:

- “The Optimist”: named by the poet Salim Abdel Qader who wrote the song “optimistic”.
- “The University Singer ”: he was nicknamed this after he took upon himself the reviving of concerts and activities at Al-Zarqa University while completing his studies there.
- “The Artist of the Syrian Revolution” after the start of the Syrian Revolution in 3/2011, as he was one of the first artists to support the revolution in his productions.
- “The Ambassador of Humanity” because of his appointment as an ambassador for humanity from several international charities.

== with the Quran ==
Yahya Hawwa has led Tarawih prayers since 1992 in several mosques in Makkah Al-Mukarramah, Jeddah and several other cities in America and Australia. In addition to other mosques all around the world including the Al-Kalouti Mosque in Jordan, and the LMC Mosque (East London Center) in Britain. Al-Imam Al-Nawawi Mosque – Amman, Jordan, and Al-Rawda Mosque in Montreal, Al-Rawda Mosque in Lebanon, Lady Aisha Mosque in Amman, and Anatolian Mosque in Mississauga, Canada. Hawwa presented several Qur’anic productions:

First: The complete recitation of the Noble Qur’an with the supplication of the Qur’an seal (audio).

Second: The morning and evening supplications (audio, video),

Third: Ruqya (healing supplications) (Audio)

Other readings and recitations of the Qur'an

== Festivals and concerts ==
The artist Yahya Hawwa revived hundreds of festivals and events in countries all over the world, and visited nearly 40 countries and more than 150 cities

The most prominent of these festivals and parties:

- IRS Canada Festival 2019
- Muslim fest 2017, 2018, 2019 – Canada
- Millionaire Festival of Liberation, Egypt 2011.
- Alexandria Festival 2011
- JPU Festival, London 2006, 2007, 2008, 2009.
- Bourges Festival, Paris 2011.
- Chicago MAS Festival, 2013, 2014, 2015, 2011, 2012.
- Hayat FM Festival 1st, 2nd and 3rd, Jordan 2006, 2007, 2010 AD.
- Umm Al-Qura University Festival, Saudi Arabia
- February Nights Festival, Kuwait 2009, 2010.
- FML Festival Montreal Canada 2019
- Voices of Light Festival, Charitable Activities Committee Australia 2007, 2012
- Oman Photo Festival, Sultanate of Oman 2011.
- Rabat Festival, Morocco 2002.
- Algeria Festival 2002, 2003, 2004, 2007, 2008.
- Sudan Festival 2009.
- Third Tripoli Nights Festival, Lebanon, 2011.
- 8th Palestinian Day Party / Britain.
- Concert a Bright Light, Opera House / Egypt 2012.
- Sound Of Light Concert, Britain 2012.

More than a hundred concerts in support of the Syrian people in: (America, Turkey, Saudi Arabia, Lebanon, Jordan, Egypt, Malaysia, Australia, Britain, France, Belgium, Germany, Algeria, Morocco, and Canada).

== See also ==
- Syrian people
- Music of Syria
