= Sarah Joseph (editor) =

- Born: 1971 (age 54–55)
- Occupations: CEO and Editor of emel magazine

Sarah Joseph OBE was CEO and Editor of the bygone Muslim lifestyle magazine emel and a commentator on British Muslims. She converted to Islam at the age of 16 in 1988 after being brought up as a Catholic.

== Recognition ==
Joseph was awarded an OBE in 2004 for services to "interfaith dialogue and the promotion of women's rights".

In 2006, she was included in the "Muslim Power 100" list in the UK by Carter Anderson. In 2010, she was listed as one of the "world's 500 most influential Muslims" by Georgetown University's The Prince Al-Waleed Bin Talaal Center for Muslim-Christian Understanding and Royal Islamic Strategic Studies Centre of Jordan.
