= Emel (magazine) =

Islamic magazine in the United Kingdom

emel
- Categories: Islam, lifestyle
- Frequency: Monthly
- Founder: Sarah Joseph; Mahmud al-Rashid
- Founded: 2003
- First issue: September 2003
- Final issue: January 2013
- Country: United Kingdom
- Based in: London, England
- Language: English
- Website: www.emel.com

Emel (styled emel) was a British lifestyle magazine that reported on contemporary British Muslim culture. The final issue appeared in January 2013.

== History ==
Sarah Joseph co-founded the magazine with her husband, Mahmud al-Rashid, in September 2003. Joseph was the magazine's editor, and al-Rashid was a volunteer publisher and editor-in-chief.

It was the first mainstream Muslim magazine in the UK to experience cross-over interest from non-Muslim readers and its circulation reached 30 countries.

Writing in the Journal of Middle East Women's Studies in 2010, Reina Lewis claimed: "For emel, lifestyle has the potential to situate modern Muslim practices as part of contemporary consumer culture while simultaneously celebrating Islam's historical heritage."

Lloyds TSB partnered with emel to launch what it claimed is the first user-generated content driven community website targeting British Muslims, as part of a campaign to promote the national rollout of its sharia-friendly banking services. The new community website, called Emel Postcard, allowed members to upload pictures and comments via downloadable "postcards".

== Awards and nominations ==
In January 2014, emel was nominated for the Responsible Media of the Year award at the British Muslim Awards.

== See also ==
- Islam in the United Kingdom
