= Jamal Badawi =

Egyptian-Canadian author, preacher and speaker on Islam

Jamal A. Badawi (Arabic: جمال بدوي) is an Egyptian-Canadian author, preacher and speaker on Islam.

== Life ==
Badawi completed his undergraduate studies at Ain Shams University in Cairo. He left for the United States in the 1960s and completed his Masters and doctorate, both in the department of Business Administration, at Indiana University Bloomington. He has been serving as a volunteer imam of the local Muslim community in the Halifax Regional Municipality since 1970. He cites Hassan al-Banna as an influence.

Badawi was formerly a professor in the Sobey School of Business, Saint Mary's University in Halifax, Nova Scotia.

Badawi is married and the father of five children, and grandfather of 23.

== Career ==
In addition to his participation in lectures, seminars and interfaith dialogues in North America, Badawi was invited as a guest speaker in various functions throughout the world. He is also active in several Islamic organizations, including the Canadian Council on American-Islamic Relations, the Fiqh Council of North America (FCNA), the Muslim American Society (MAS), and the European Council for Fatwa and Research (ECFR). He is also a member of the Islamic Society of North America (ISNA) and the founder and chairman of the Islamic Information Foundation, a non-profit foundation seeking to promote a better understanding of Islam and Muslims towards non-Muslims. He has lectured extensively in North America and abroad, and speaks on a variety of topics including Islam and Christianity and is a guest scholar at The American Learning Institute for Muslims. In 1997, he debated Christian apologist William Lane Craig over the concept of God in Christianity and Islam.

According to Gofran Sawalha of Middle East Eye, he is among "the best contributors to Islamic knowledge in America".

Badawi has authored several books and articles on Islam. He also researched, designed and presented a 352-segment television series on Islam, aired in Canada, the US and other countries.

In 2017, Badawi stated that "[t]errorism has no religion" in response to the Quebec City mosque shooting. In 2018, he expressed concern regarding the presence of the National Citizens Alliance at the Annapolis Valley Apple Blossom Festival in Kentville, Nova Scotia.

== Publications ==
- 1,000 Questions on Islam Islamic Book Services,
- Selected prayers Oscar Publications, Dehi 2007; ISBN 81-7435-533-2
- Gender Equity in Islam: Basic Principles American Trust Publications, 1995; ISBN 978-0-89259-159-6
- Leadership: An Islamic Perspective (jointly with Beekun Rafiq Issa) Amana Publications, 1999; ISBN 0-915957-94-9
- Muhammad in the Bible Small pamphlet, 1982
- Status of Women in Islam Small pamphlet, 1976
- Muslim Woman’s Dress According to the Qur'an and the Sunnah and Islamic Ethics Small pamphlet, 1980
- Polygamy in Islamic Law Small pamphlet
- Islam: A Brief Look Small pamphlet
