= Mercy Mission =

UK-based non-profit organization

- Formation: 2006; 20 years ago
- Founder: Tawfique Chowdhury
- Type: NGO
- Headquarters: UK
- Founder, CEO: Tawfique Chowdhury
- Website: Official website

Mercy Mission is a non-profit organization founded by Tawfique Chowdhury in 2007. It focuses on supporting Muslims returning to their faith.

== History ==
Mercy Mission was founded with the motto “knowledge and action.” It was founded in Australia and subsequently spread to the UK, South Africa, India, Canada, Malaysia, Bangladesh and Pakistan.

As of 2013 it had over twenty projects, mainly divided into education and social service.

== Organization ==
The organization's mission is to promote religious observance, confidence, self-sufficiency, and selflessness.

According to Charity Commission for England and Wales Mercy Mission UK has an annual revenue of £851,846 and expenditures of £779,079. It has over 3000 volunteers who were mainly recruited through its AlKauthar institute.

== Programs ==
=== Family and community ===
==== Charity Right ====
Charity Right is a not-for-profit organization under Mercy Mission established in 2013 which focuses on providing food to chronically hungry people worldwide. It feeds thousands of people weekly and aims to verify its spending by providing pictures and GPS coordinates. It raises funds through its website, charity dinners and public charity events. Charity Right also provides job matching and training with the help of government bodies.

==== Women's shelters ====
Mercy Mission's women's shelters cater to homeless Muslim women in Melbourne, London, Birmingham, Manchester, Mumbai and Kuala Lumpur. The temporary accommodation offered by the charity provides an environment which complies with the Islamic way of life. Mercy Mission also help the new converts to Islam through a dedicated website and buddy system. Every participant in the "New Muslim Care" goes through a cycle which includes components to assist them with various educational, emotional, and social needs. Pure Matrimony, another initiative that started along with other sister projects at Mercy Mission, is world's largest Muslim matrimonial website exclusively catering for practising single Muslims that is exclusively owned by TSQ Media Limited.

=== Education ===
==== Alkauthar Institute ====
The organization offers the Alkauthar institute which has offered courses in 25 cities to over 57,000 students since its inception. This institute is similar to AlMaghrib Institute. Mercy Mission organizes the "Annual Islamic Conference", "Twins of Faith" and "Being ME" in the UK, Malaysia, Australia and Canada. It also publishes a magazine for children which teaches about various topics, such as science and history, as well as Islam.

==== Ramadan TV ====
Ramadan TV is designed for the Muslim viewer in the month of Ramadan. The channel is designed to showcase a diverse portfolio of shows to reach a wide range of Muslims and help them increase in god consciousness. The channel claims that in 2010, 8/10 Muslim homes reported having viewed the channel. Ramadan TV has also helped the Syrian victims and refugees through its TV series during the Syrian civil war in 2013. Ramadan TV was available in the UK on Sky channel 875 from 12 June to 29 July 2014 as Showcase 3.

==== Revival Tours ====
In 2014, Mercy Mission announced its first Umrah tour (called Revival Tours) to the Islamic holy cities of Makka and Medina.

==== International school programs ====
In 2015, Mercy Mission began its first international school program, called Seven Skies, in Malaysia. In 2016, Mercy Mission announced a branch of Seven Skies in Australia. Although first announced in 2014, in 2017 Mercy Mission re-announced its second International School program (called Guardian) in Canada.

=== Business and sustainability ===
==== National Zakat Foundation ====
National Zakat foundation collects zakat, which Muslims are required to pay each year and helps local Muslims.

==== The Zam Zam Project ====
The Zam Zam project deals with the water conservation at mosques and community centres. It was nominated for the 2009 National Savewater Awards in Australia. It also deals with clean up projects with municipal corporation of Mumbai to make the neighborhoods clean and livable.

==== The Foundation for the Advancement of Muslim Enterprise ====
The Foundation for the Advancement of Muslim Enterprise (FAME) is a network dedicated to the advancement of Muslim professionals, business owners, entrepreneurs, academics and those emerging professionals who are engaged in studies with aspirations of entrepreneurship. It offers its members regular forums to network and exchanges ideas with fellow professionals.

== Criticism ==
In 2012 Mercy Mission came under criticism for Ramadan TV's "Save Maryam" campaign, which inaccurately claimed that 2 million Muslims convert to Christianity each year.
