= Native Deen =

American hip hop group

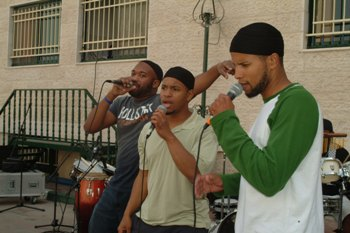
- Performing at a school in Ramallah, 2007

Background information
- Origin: Washington, DC
- Genres: Hip hop, R&B, Islamic, nasheed
- Labels: The Native Deen Group, LLC
- Members: Joshua Salaam; Naeem Muhammad; Abdul-Malik Ahmad
- Website: www.nativedeen.com

Native Deen is an Islamic musical group from the Washington, D.C. area. Native Deen's music combines hip hop and R&B styles with lyrical themes grounded in Islam. They have three albums: Deen You Know, Not Afraid To Stand Alone and The Remedy (Native Deen album).

== The band and its music ==
"Deen" in Arabic means "religion" or "way of life." Native Deen comprises Joshua Salaam, Naeem Muhammad, and Abdul-Malik Ahmad, young Muslim men who were born and raised in the District of Columbia. Their music seeks to inspire young people to keep their Islamic faith amidst the pressures and temptations of daily life. Group members identify themselves as Muslim, and wear traditional Islamic dress such as kufis and shalwar kameez. They say there is more than one way to identify as a Muslim, both by etiquette and dress. Their music typifies the subgenre "positive hip-hop".

== Charitable work and activism ==
At the third annual Islamic Relief "Evening of Inspiration", in Costa Mesa, California, Muhammad narrated a powerful slideshow, projecting images of needy, hungry children from around the world to illustrate why Islam demands that Muslims give to the less fortunate. He said that Islamic Relief "helps the most vulnerable people from all walks of life. People don't understand how much a dollar can do. That's why this event is more than just a concert – it's a call to action."

== Performances ==
Native Deen performs at Islamic conferences, fundraisers, and holiday gatherings (often during Ramadan and Eid-ul-Adha). The group is relatively well known among Muslim youth in North America, and has toured internationally.

Native Deen's music typically features drums, synthesized instruments, and vocals. Due to the belief of the majority of the Islamic scholars on the matter, wind, string, and metal instruments are never used.

== Origins and development ==
Native Deen's members met through Muslim Youth of North America (MYNA). Each appeared on MYNA RAPS, an album produced to spotlight the work of aspiring Muslim songwriters and recording artists. Salaam, Ahmad, and Muhammad, who were performing as solo acts, joined together to form Native Deen.

== Discography ==
Year	Title	Label
2005	Deen You Know	Jamal Records
2007	Not Afraid to Stand Alone	Jamal Records
2011	The Remedy	Jamal Records
