= Islamic music =

Musical traditions among various Muslim populations

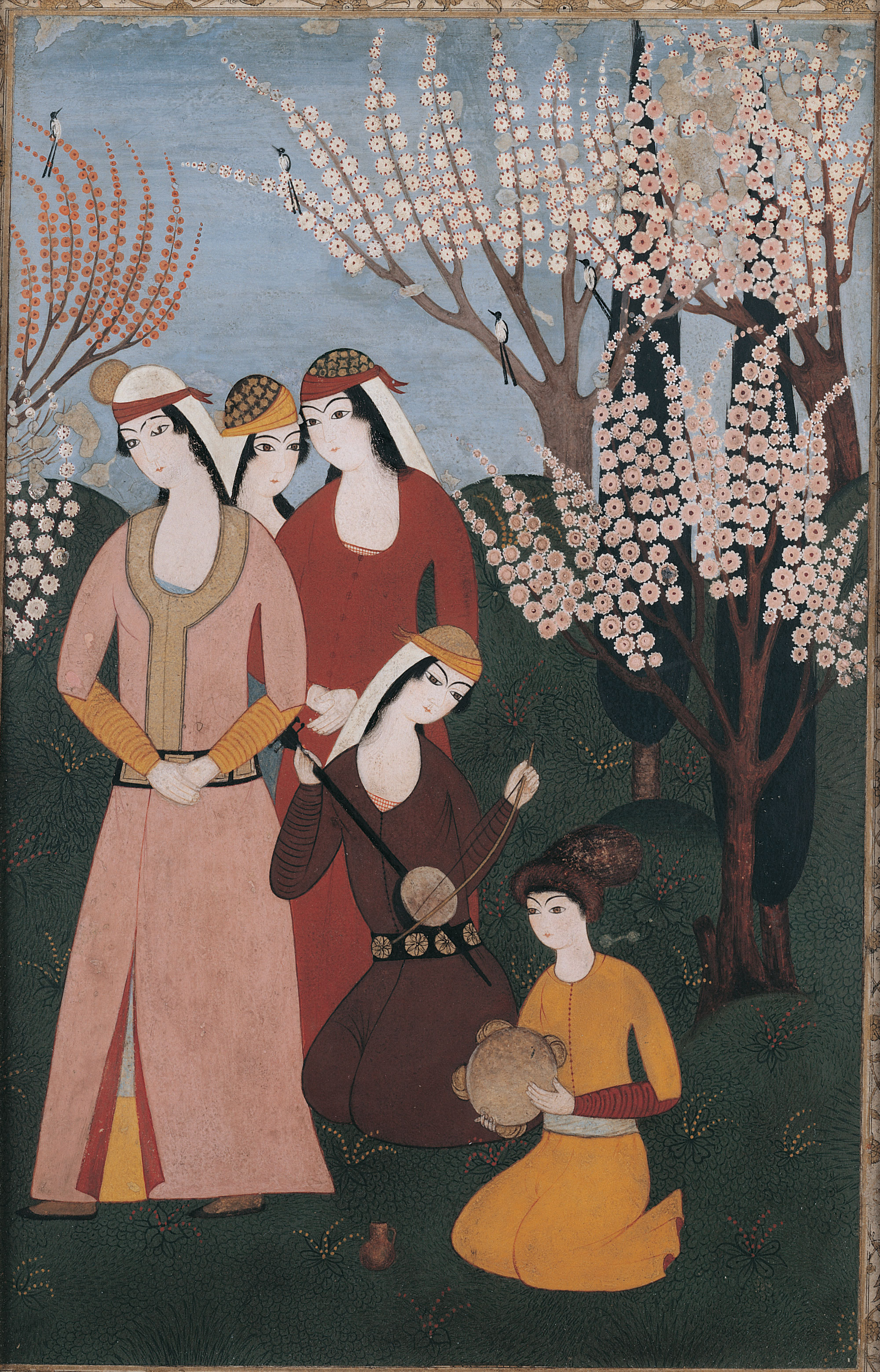
Artistic depiction of a musical gathering in the Ottoman Empire, 18th century

Islamic music collectively refers to the musical traditions among various Muslim populations throughout history. It implies both religious music, as performed in public or private devotional services, and generally secular music associated with any culture historically dominated or heavily influenced by Islam, including those of West Asia and North Africa, parts of the Horn of Africa and West Africa, Central Asia, South Asia, and the Balkans. The pre-existing indigenous musical styles (Arabic, Iranian, Roman/Byzantine, Indian, etc.) of regions where the spread of Islam took place contributed greatly to the development of Islamic music as an art of fusion. The word for "music" in Arabic (موسيقى mūsīqā) is defined more narrowly than it is in English and other languages, and "its concept" was at least originally "reserved for secular art music; separate names and concepts belonged to folk songs and to religious chants".

At least one scholar (Jacob M. Landau) observed that Islamic music "is characterized by a highly subtle organization of melody and rhythm", that "the vocal component predominates over the instrumental", and that the individual musician "is permitted, and indeed encouraged, to improvise" in its creation.

Despite the flourishing of music during and since the Islamic Golden Age in the Abbasid Caliphate, the question of whether creating and indulging in music and associated arts is permissible in Islam has remained a subject of debate in Islamic scholarship, with some asserting that the prohibition may not apply to some specific forms of the art. Islamic music is also credited with influencing more modern musical styles in the Western world; French musicologist Rodolphe François, for example, in his assessment of the Abbasid era in Islamic history, credits the Kitab al-Musiqa al-Kabir (Arabic: كِتٰبَ ٱلمُوْسِيقَىٰ ٱلكَبِيرُ; lit. 'The Great Book of Music') by al-Farabi as one such treatise attesting to this influence.

== Secular and folk musical styles ==
=== Classical Islamic music ===
According to Landau, "a fusion of musical styles" was able to develop between "pre-Islamic Arabian music" and the music of the Persians, the Byzantines, the Egyptians, Mesopotamia, the Turks, and the Moors because of "strong affinities between Arabic music and the music of the nations occupied by the expanding Arabic peoples". The core area where this "new art" of classical Islamic music succeeded stretched "from the Nile valley to Persia". However, many parts of the Muslim world did not adopt the "new art" of classical Islamic music, or adopted it but also kept native music forms which were "alien" to classical Islamic music. In general, the farther from the area between the Nile and Persia one travels, "the less one finds undiluted Islamic music."

=== West Asia ===
- Arabic music (Iraqi, Jordanian, Kuwaiti, Lebanese, Omani, Palestinian, Qatari, Saudi Arabian, Syrian, Emirati, Yemeni)
- Caucasian music (Azerbaijani, Circassian, etc.)
- Iranian music (Persian, etc.)
- Kurdish music
- Turkish music (incl. Turkish Cypriot)

All of these regions were connected by trade long before the Islamic conquests of the 7th century, and it is likely that musical styles travelled the same routes as trade goods. However, lacking recordings, we can only speculate as to the pre-Islamic music of these areas. Islam must have had a great influence on music, as it united vast areas under the first caliphs, and facilitated trade between distant lands. Certainly, the Sufis, brotherhoods of Muslim mystics, spread their music far and wide.

Khaliji music has roots going back more than 1,000 years, to the Islamic period under the Umayyads and Abbasids.

=== North Africa ===
The Berber- and Arabic-speaking countries of Central and Western North Africa, such as Morocco, Mauritania, Algeria, Libya and Tunisia, share some musical traditions with Egypt and the Arabic-speaking countries of the Middle East. Popular modern styles of music such as raï and chaabi originated in Morocco and Algeria. In addition, West African influences can be heard in Gnawa music.

- Algerian music
- Berber music (Algeria and Morocco)
- Egyptian music
- Libyan music
- Moroccan music
  - Sahrawi music (Western Sahara)
- Tunisian music

=== Horn of Africa ===
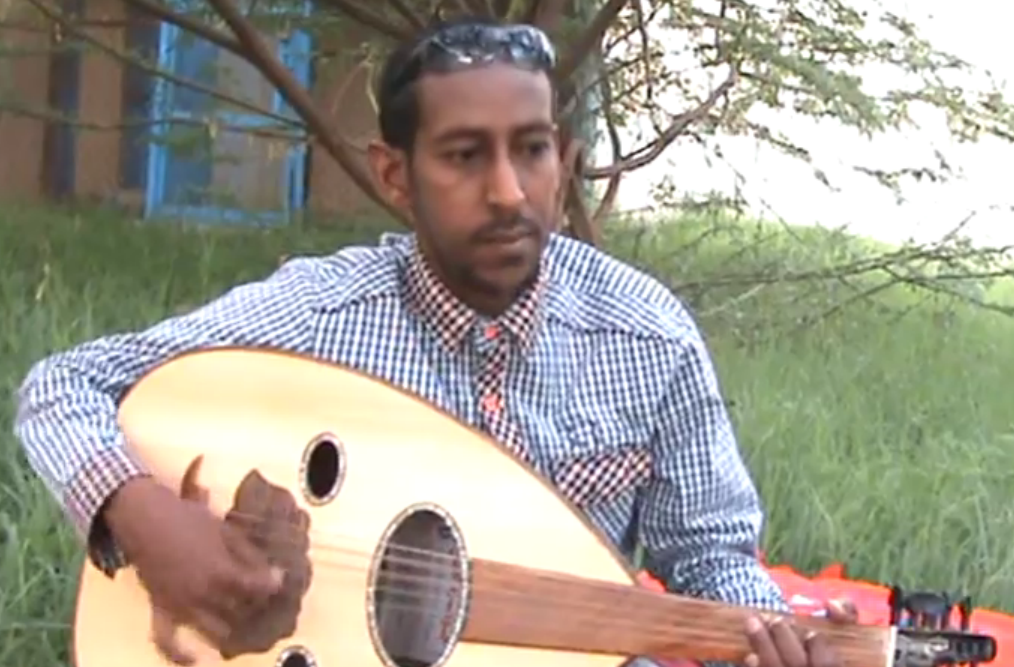
Somali oud player Nuruddin Ali Amaan

Most Somali music is based on the pentatonic scale. That is, the songs only use five pitches per octave in contrast to a heptatonic (seven note) scale such as the major scale. At first listen, Somali music might be mistaken for the sounds of nearby regions such as Ethiopia, Sudan or Eritrea, but it is ultimately recognizable by its own unique tunes and styles. Somali songs are usually the product of collaboration between lyricists (midho), songwriters (lahan), and singers ('odka or "voice"). Instruments prominently featured in Somali music include the kaban (oud).

=== West Africa ===
Islam is the largest and oldest organized religion in this region, although indigenous Sahelian and Saharan styles and genres are more prominent than those influenced by Middle-Eastern theory.^{[Clarification needed]}

West African musical genres are more varied, and tend to incorporate both native and Berber influences, rather than those of Arab origin. A long history of court griot music based on historical accounts and praise-singing exists in the region. Wind and string instruments, such as the Kora harp, xalam lute, or Tambin flute (similar to the ney) are generally preferred to percussion, although percussion instruments such as the talking drum and djembe are also widely played among Muslim populations.

=== Central Asia ===
Many of the countries in Central Asia such as Uzbekistan, Tajikistan and Turkmenistan have been heavily influenced by Turkic and Persian culture. Bowed instruments are common, as is bardic singing.

- Music of Central Asia

=== South Asia ===
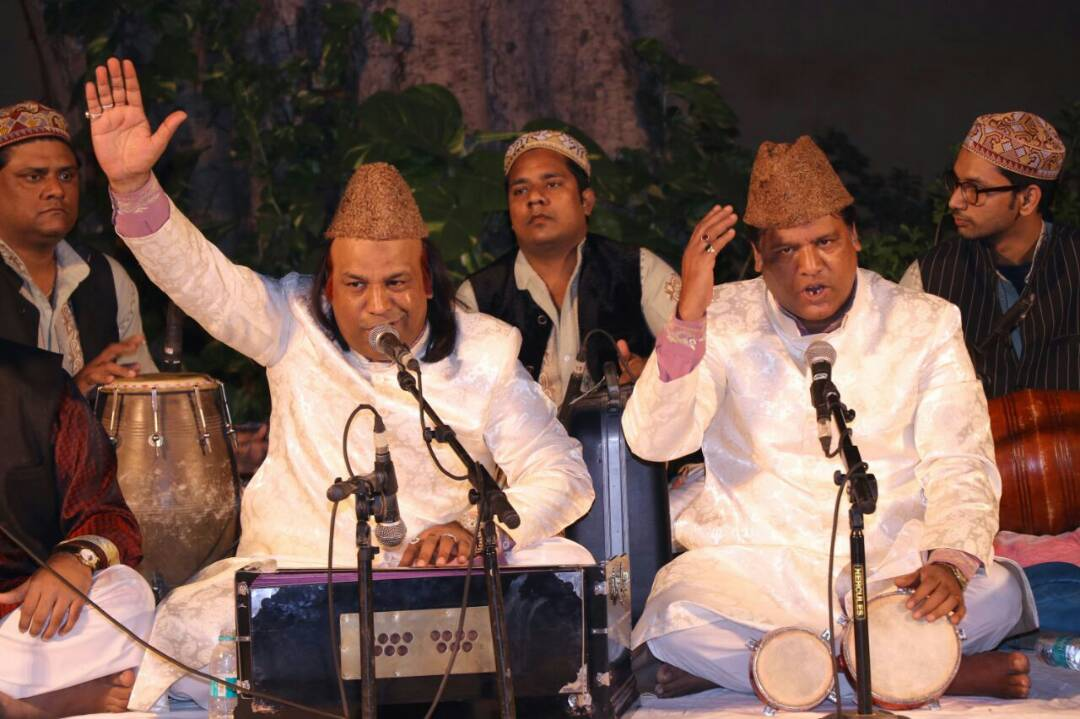
Qutbi Brothers performing qawwali in India

The music of the Muslim countries of South Asia (Afghanistan, Bangladesh, Maldives and Pakistan) as well as countries with sizeable Muslim minorities (India, Nepal and Sri Lanka) merged Middle Eastern genres with indigenous classical musical modes, and is generally distinct in style and orchestration. Yet due to the strong links encountered between the Middle-East, Central Asia, and South Asia, it is closer to Middle-Eastern styles than those of the periphery of the Islamic world, which tend to be purely indigenous.

- Music of Afghanistan
- Music of Bangladesh
- Music of Maldives
- Music of Pakistan

=== Southeast Asia ===
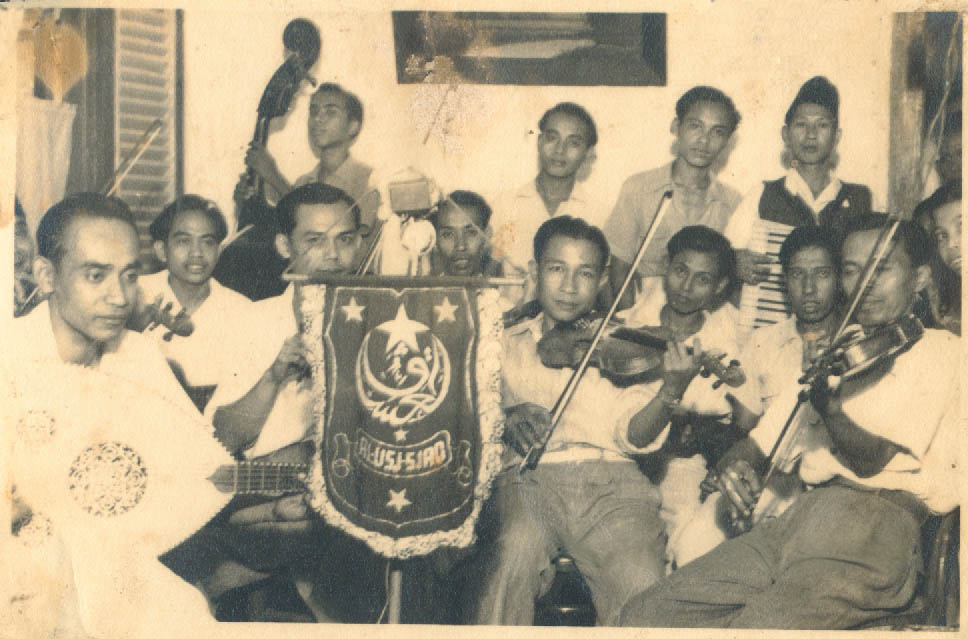
"Al-Ushyaaq" Arab-Indonesian Gambus musical ensemble in Jakarta, 1949

Muslim-majority Indonesia has been significantly less influenced by Middle Eastern traditions than South Asia. As a result, many local musical styles predate the coming of Islam, although exceptions include Malay Zapin and Joget, and the Indonesian Gambus (derived from Qanbus), all of which show strong Middle Eastern influence.

There are also local music genres in Muslim-majority regions in Southeast Asia that are influenced by Arabic traditions, such as the tagonian of the Sundanese people and glipang of the people of Probolinggo.

The music of South East Asia's Muslim-majority regions is more closely related to the musical genres of South East and East Asia. Gong chime ensembles such as Gamelan and Kulintang existed in the region before the arrival of Islam, and musical theory and method owe more to Chinese influence, as well as Hindu–Buddhist principles, than to Arabic musical philosophy. Variations of one of two main scales prevail in the region among different ensembles: slendro and pelog (both of which originated in Java).

In Java, use of the gamelan for Islamic devotional music was encouraged by the Muslim saint Sunan Kalijogo.

== Types of Muslim devotional recitation and music ==
=== Nasheed ===
Nasheeds are moral, religious recitations recited in various melodies by some Muslims of today without any musical instruments. However, some nasheed groups use percussion instruments, such as the daff. Singing moral songs of this type without instrumentation is considered permissible (halal) by many Muslims.

Sufi worship services are often called dhikr or zikr. See that article for further elaboration.

The dhikr of South Asian Muslims is "quietist". The Sufi services best known in the West are the chanting and rhythmic dancing of the whirling dervishes or Mevlevi Sufis of Turkey.

However, Sufis may also perform devotional songs in public, for the enjoyment and edification of listeners. The mood is religious, but the gathering is not a worship service.

In Turkey, once the seat of the Ottoman Empire and the Caliphate, concerts of sacred song are called "Mehfil-e-Sama' " (or "gathering of Sama'"). Song forms include ilahi and nefe.

In South Asia, especially Bangladesh, Pakistan and India, a widely known style of Sufi music is qawwali. A traditional qawwali programme would include:

- A hamd—a song in praise of Allah
- A na`at—a song in praise of Muhammad
- Manqabats—songs in praise of the illustrious teachers of the Sufi brotherhood to which the musicians belong
- Ghazals—songs of intoxication and yearning, which use the language of romantic love to express the soul's longing for union with the divine.

Shi'a qawwali performances typically follow the naat with a manqabat in praise of Ali, and sometimes a marsiya, a lamentation over the death of much of Ali's family at the Battle of Karbala.

The most well-known qawwali singer in modern times is Nusrat Fateh Ali Khan.

Another traditional South Asian genre of Sufi music is the Kafi, which is more meditative and involves solo singing as opposed to the ensemble form seen in qawwali. The most widely known exponent of the Kafi is the Pakistani singer Abida Parveen.

Sufi music has developed with the times. A Pakistani Sufi rock band, Junoon, was formed in the 1990s to bring a modern twist to suit the new younger generation. The band achieved wide popularity, in Pakistan as well as in the West.

=== Music for public religious celebrations ===
- Ta'ziyeh music—ta'ziyeh is a passion play, part musical drama, part religious drama, rarely performed outside Iran. It depicts the martyrdom of Imam Husayn ibn Ali, venerated by Shia Muslims.
- Ashura music—performed during the Muharram mourning period, commemorating the deaths of Imam Husayn and his followers. (Shia)
- Thikiri (from the Arabic word "Dhikr") which means remembrance of God—performed by the Qadiriyya Sufi orders of waYao or Yao people in East and Southern Africa (Tanzania, Mozambique, Malawi, Zimbabwe, and South Africa).
- Menzuma—moral songs performed in Ethiopia.
- Madih nabawi—Arabic hymns praising the Islamic prophet Muhammad.

== Modes ==
- Arabic Maqam
- Dastgah
- Turkish makam

According to scholar Jacob M. Landau, in Islamic music, "melodies are organized in terms of maqāmāt (singular maqām), or "modes," characteristic melodic patterns with prescribed scales, preferential notes, typical melodic and rhythmic formulas, variety of intonations, and other conventional devices."

Rhythmic forms are known as īqāʿāt (singular īqāʿ), and are marked by "cyclical patterns of strong and weak beats".

== Instruments ==
Although there are a wide variety of opinions on the permissibility of musical instruments, those who produce Islamic music with instruments often feature the following instruments:

Traditional:

- Drums (daf, bendir, zarb, rebana, etc.)
- Gongs

== Differences of opinion over prohibition ==
Strictly speaking, the words 'Islamic religious music' present a contradiction in terms. The practice of orthodox Sunni and Shi'a Islam does not involve any activity recognized within Muslim cultures as 'music'. The melodious recitation of the Holy Qur'an and the call to prayer are central to Islam, but generic terms for music have never been applied to them. Instead, specialist designations have been used. However, a wide variety of religious and spiritual genres that use musical instruments exists, usually performed at various public and private assemblies outside the orthodox sphere.

— Eckhard Neubauer, Veronica Doubleday, Islamic religious music, New Grove Dictionary of Music online

The question of permissibility of music in Islamic jurisprudence is historically disputed, and with the advent of a whole new generation of Muslim musicians who try to blend their work and faith, the issue "has taken on extra significance".

Islamic art and music flourished during the Islamic Golden Age.

== Contemporary Islamic music ==
Notable nasheed artists include:
- Atif Aslam – Pakistan
- Ahmad Hussain – United Kingdom
- Ahmed Bukhatir – United Arab Emirates
- Ahmet Özhan – Turkey
- Akagündüz Kutbay – Turkey
- Abu Ratib – Syria
- Al-Andalus Ensemble – Spain
- Dawud Wharnsby – Canada
- Haddad Alwi – Indonesia
- Syech bin Abdul Qodir Assegaf – Indonesia
- Hamza Namira – Egypt
- Hamza Robertson – United Kingdom
- Imad Rami – Syria
- Junaid Jamshed – Pakistan
- Maher Zain – Sweden
- Mecca2Medina – United Kingdom
- Mesut Kurtis – United Kingdom
- Muslim Belal – United Kingdom
- Native Deen – United States
- Nazeel Azami – United Kingdom
- Raef – United States
- Raihan – Malaysia
- Sami Yusuf – United Kingdom
- Yahya Hawwa – Syria
- Yusuf Islam – United Kingdom
- Zain Bhikha – South Africa

Notable Sufi singers include:

- Nusrat Fateh Ali Khan – Pakistan
- Abida Parveen – Pakistan
- Sabri Brothers – Pakistan
- Munshi Raziuddin – India
- Fareed Ayaz – Pakistan
- Alam Lohar – Pakistan

Noted composers:

- A. R. Rahman – India
- Resul Pookutty – India
- Rohail Hyatt – Pakistan

== See also ==
- Afghanistan National Institute of Music
- Andalusi classical music (Spain)
- Durood
- Hamd
- Islamic poetry
- Mawlid
- Mehfil
- Na'at
- Nasheed
- Religious music in Iran
- Sufi poetry
- Sufism
- Sufi music
