= Dawud Wharnsby =

- Also known as: Dawud Wharnsby-Ali; Dawud Ali
- Born: David Howard Wharnsby; June 27, 1972 (age 54); Kitchener, Ontario, Canada
- Genres: Folk; Nasheed; Spoken Word; Hamd; World music
- Occupations: Musician, songwriter, producer, poet
- Instruments: Vocals, guitar, mandolin, banjo, bazouki, oud, bodhran, bongos, djembe, clarinet, tin whistle
- Years active: 1991–present
- Labels: Enter into Peace (1995–present), Sound Vision (1996–2003), Beloved Musika (2006–2009)
- Website: www.wharnsby.com

Dawud Wharnsby (born David Howard Wharnsby; June 27, 1972) is a Canadian singer-songwriter, poet, performer, educator and television personality. A multi-instrumentalist, he is best known for his work in the musical/poetic genre of English Language nasheed and spoken word.

== Early artistic career ==
Born in Kitchener, Ontario in 1972, David Wharnsby became active in local theatrical productions during his early teens, first performing on a world-class theater stage at the age of 18 in a production of "Jesus Christ Superstar" (Annas). Other stage work of his late teens included roles in "You're A Good Man Charlie Brown" (Schroeder) and "Rosencrantz & Guildenstern Are Dead".

At the age of 19, Wharnsby began performing throughout Southern Ontario as a solo musical artist and as a member of various musical groups. His first professional work as a musician was with folk quartet Crakenthorpe's Teapot, hired to perform on street corners of their hometown. Wharnsby travelled extensively throughout Ontario, England and Scotland during 1993 and 1994 as a solo busker – singing informally on street corners and in parks to market and share his music. In 1993, he started his own independent recording entity, Three Keyed Maple Seeds, which in 1996 was renamed Enter into Peace and registered with SOCAN as a music publishing entity.

During the early 1990s, Wharnsby worked as a professional actor and puppeteer for two different educational theater troupes, touring public schools and folk festivals throughout Ontario. At the age of 20, he played lead in a short educational film "To Catch A Thief", distributed nationally in Canada to schools as part of the John Howard Society's anti-shoplifting program.

== Music ==
In 1993, Dawud (David) Wharnsby and fellow Crackenthorpe's Teapot vocalist Heather Chappell began touring and performing as a duo, releasing an independent album (Off To Reap The Corn) containing renditions of traditional Canadian and Irish folk music. The recording also featured Wharnsby's original lyrical adaptation of the traditional song "The Black Velvet Band". His comical version "The Black Velvet Band as Never Before" is still sung in folk music circles.

Dawud has released several internationally distributed albums since 1995, including Blue Walls and the Big Sky, Vacuous Waxing (with Canadian writer Bill Kocher), A Different Drum (with The Fletcher Valve Drummers) and Out Seeing The Fields. In the mid-1990s, Dawud began to work in the genre of English language nasheed (spiritual hymns of a folk/world-beat style, drawn from Qur'anic tradition). He has released over 10 popular albums of spiritual nasheed since 1993, including A Whisper of Peace, Colours of Islam, Road to Madinah and Sunshine Dust and the Messenger, all released through US based media company Sound Vision.Com.

September 3, 2007 Dawud released "Out Seeing the Fields" composed of 12 tracks, co-produced with LA based pianist Idris Phillips. The 11th track of the album named "Rachel" is a tribute to Rachel Corrie who was killed by an Israel Defense Forces (IDF) Caterpillar D9R armoured bulldozer, during an ISM protest against the destruction of Palestinian homes by the IDF in the Gaza Strip.

During his career Dawud has collaborated with Stephen Fearing, Irshad Khan, Danny Thompson, Yusuf Islam (aka Cat Stevens), Zain Bhikha, Idris Phillips, Billy Jonas, Hadiqa Kiani and Atif Aslam.

Wharnsby was a founding member of the interfaith, acoustic trio "Abraham Jam”. Formed in 2010, the band (also including David LaMotte and Billy Jonas) incorporates themes of diversity, inclusivity and social harmony into their performances and recordings. Their album "Abraham Jam Live" was released in 2018, and a studio album, "White Moon", was released in 2019. The documentary “Braided Prayer:Abraham Jam and The Making of White Moon” was also released in 2020, screened at the NexGn International Short Film Festival (India), The Hague Global Cinema Festival (Netherlands), San Jose International Short Film Festival (USA) and the Twin Cities Jewish Film Festival (USA). Abraham Jam’s original composition “Braided Prayer" combining recitations of Muslim, Christian and Jewish prayer, was included in the 2024 Broadway production of Our Town at the Ethel Barrymore Theatre.

== Television, video and radio production ==
As a television personality, Dawud has hosted programs produced in conjunction with Canada's Vision TV, the National Film Board of Canada, Al Huda TV (Saudi Arabia), Deen TV, Muslim Network Television and BBC Scotland.

== Educational efforts ==
In honour of author, screenwriter and lecturer Rod Serling, Wharnsby (inspired as a child by Serlings' work) is also a supporter of the Rod Serling Memorial Foundation and contributor to The Foundation's scholarship fund.

Dawud Wharnsby served as an Ambassador of Scouting for the UK Scout Association from June 2010 until 2015.

== Personal life ==
In 1993, David Howard Wharnsby embraced the teachings of the Qur'an changing his name to "Dawud" (Arabic: داوود) – the Arabic form of "David" – and added the name "Ali" (Arabic: علي) to his surname. The name "Ali" was dropped from professional use in 2003, but remains a part of his legal name. Wharnsby has identified himself as a Muslim since 1993 and also adheres to the principles of Unitarian Universalism.

Married in 2003, Dawud Wharnsby, his wife and their two children have lived at times in Colorado, United States, Abbottabad, Pakistan and in Waterloo, Ontario, Canada. Wharnsby and his family have resided in Nashville, Tennessee since July 2022.

Though family ties do exist, Dawud Wharnsby is not to be confused with film editor David Wharnsby, also a native of the Kitchener-Waterloo area.

== In the media ==
Dawud Wharnsby was named in a November 21, 2008 article by The Sun, as being a primary influence in an alleged conversion to the religion of Islam by pop star Michael Jackson. The article stated that Wharnsby and fellow musician Idris Phillips were "pals" of Michael Jackson and had talked to him "about their beliefs, and how they thought they had become better people after they converted.". The article was subsequently run by major print and television media worldwide.

Following the death of Michael Jackson on June 25, 2009, the original Sun article resurfaced, intensifying rumours surrounding Jackson's religious affiliation and his alleged "conversion" to the religion of Islam through the counsel of Dawud Wharnsby and Idris Phillips. A June 26, 2009 public statement by Wharnsby, initially presented on his official website stated:

"For the record: Though our professional circles did cross-over slightly... I never had the honour or pleasure of meeting Michael Jackson personally, nor did we ever correspond on matters of our professions, personal lives or faiths."

On the topic of conversion, Wharnsby also stated:

"My approach to faith does not include concepts of "conversion/reversion" or "propagation", so the very idea that I would have even tried to "convert" Mr. Jackson (or anyone else for that matter) to my spiritual perspective, is silly."

In November 2009 Dawud Wharnsby's name was included in the category of "Entertainment and The Arts" on a list of the 500 Most Influential Muslims, compiled by The Royal Islamic Strategic Studies Centre (Jordan), and published with support of Georgetown University's Prince Alwaleed Bin Talal Center for Muslim-Christian Understanding. Wharnsby has also been included on all follow-up lists published annually until the present date.

== Discography ==
=== Solo work ===
Year	Album
1995	Blue Walls and the Big Sky
1996	A Whisper of Peace
1997	Colours of Islam
1998	Road to Madinah
2002	Sunshine, Dust and The Messenger
2003	The Prophet's Hands
2005	Vacuous Waxing
2006	The Poets and The Prophet
2007	Out Seeing The Fields
2011	A Picnic of Poems
2014	Acoustic Simplicitea
2017	A Whisper of Peace/Colours of Islam Anniversary Remaster

=== CD singles and EP releases ===
Year	Album
1999	The Letter – Songs of Struggle and Hope
2004	Love Strong
2010	Shady Grove
2010	Twinkle, Twinkle
2010	Welcome to The I.C.E. (Percussion only version)

=== Selected collaborations ===
Year	Album
1993	Off to Reap the Corn (with Heather Chappell)
1994	Fine Flowers in The Valley (with Heather Chappell)
2001	Light Upon Light (Various Artists)
2001	Faith (with Zain Bhikha)
2001	Bismillah (with Yusuf Islam and Friends)
2002	In Praise of The Last Prophet (with Yusuf Islam and Friends)
2003	Salaam (with Irfan Makki)
2004	Days of Eid (Various Artists)
2005	Expressions of Faith (Various Artists)
2005	Celebrate! Holidays of The Global Village (with Chris McKhool)
2005	I Look I See (with Yusuf Islam)
2006	Allah Knows (with Zain Bhikha)
2007	Man Ana? (with Khalid Belrhouzi)
2008	Aled Jones Presents: Good Morning Sunday (Various Artists)
2010	Pages of Hope (with Lines of Faith)
2011	Hope (with Zain Bhikha)
2011	Kalima (with Hadiqa Kiyani)
2014	Songs of A Soul (with Zain Bhikha)
2014	Longing (with Kailashi)
2014	Allah Is on My Side (with Malik Naim)
2015	The Passing Traveller (with Zain Bhikha)
2018	Abraham Jam - Live (with Abraham Jam)
2018	Prophetic Praise (Various Artists)
2019	All About Me (with Raef (singer))
2019	White Moon (with Abraham Jam)

=== Narrative work ===
Year	Album
2000	Gifts of Muhammad (introduced by Dawud Wharnsby)
2000	40 Hadith (introduced by Dawud Wharnsby)
2001	Timeless Wisdom Volume 1
2001	Timeless Wisdom Volume 2
2001	A Simple Guide to Prayer (with Yusuf Islam)
2004	Companions of The Prophet

=== Music videos ===
Year	Title
2006	You Can't Take It With You (With Zain Bhikha)
2006	Allah Knows (with Zain Bhikha)
2006	Midnight
2011	Out Seeing The Fields
2013	All Of Us

== Published work ==
- Nasheed Artist (Books 4 Schools, UK, 2005, ISBN 0-9543652-6-7) (author/co-illustrator)
- For Whom The Troubadour Sings (Kube Publishing Ltd, UK, 2009, ISBN 978-1-84774-011-3) (author)
- A Picnic of Poems in Allah's Green Garden (Kube Publishing Ltd, UK, 2011, ISBN 978-0-86037-444-2) (author)
- Colours of Islam (Kube Publishing Ltd, UK, 2013, ISBN 978-0-86037-591-3) (author)
- A Whisper of Peace (Kube Publishing Ltd, UK, 2014, ISBN 978-0-86037-534-0) (author)

== Television and video appearances ==
- Muslim Network Television (2022–Present) (Script Editor, Audio Producer, Segment Host)
- Come In On The Bridge (Deen TV, 2013/2014) (Host)
- As Salamu Alaikum! (Sound Vision, 2005) (Soundtrack and actor/puppeteer)
- A New Life in a New Land (Milo Productions/University of Saskatoon/NFB, 2004) (Soundtrack and host)
- BBC Schools – Watch Celebrations: Ramadan And Eid (BBC Scotland, 2003) (Host)
- Sing, Children of The World (Sound Vision, 2002) (Host)
- Stories Behind The Songs (Sound Vision, 2002) (Host)
- Rhythm of Islam (Sound Vision, 2002) (Host)
- Alif Is For Allah (Sound Vision, 2000) (Soundtrack and actor/puppeteer)
- The Humble Muslim (Sound Vision, 1999) (Soundtrack and actor/puppeteer)
- Ramadan Mubarak (Sound Vision, 1998) (Soundtrack and actor/puppeteer)
- To Catch A Thief (John Howard Society of Canada, 1990) (Actor)
