= Islam Channel =

Television channel

Coordinates: 51°31′22.02″N 0°5′5.41″W

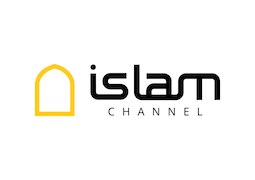
- Country: United Kingdom
- Broadcast area: Worldwide (except Oceania and South America)
- Headquarters: London, United Kingdom

Programming
- Picture format: 16:9

Ownership
- Owner: Islam Channel Ltd.

History
- Launched: March 2004

Links
- Website: www.islamchannel.tv www.islamchannelurdu.tv www.islamchannelbangla.tv

Availability

Terrestrial
- GOtv (Africa): Channel 81

Streaming media
- Broadband: Live Internet Broadcast
- Broadband: Live Internet Broadcast
- Broadband: Live Internet Broadcast

Islam Channel is a UK-based, free-to-air, English language, Islamic-focused satellite television channel and online media platform funded by advertising and donations. It was founded in 2004 by Mohamed Ali Harrath, a Tunisian activist and businessman; his son, Mohamed Harrath, is now its chief executive officer. It was reported in 2008 that UK government research found that 59% of British Muslims watched the channel. It broadcasts across Europe, the Middle East and Africa, and is streamed live on the internet. Islam Channel began broadcasting in March 2004 on Sky Digital channel 836, but subsequently moved to channel 813, then 806, now 737. In April 2010, it launched on Freesat channel 693. In 2015, Islam Channel Urdu was launched. In 2017, both channels launched on Virgin Media; Islam Channel can be watched on 838 and Islam Channel Urdu on 839. In 2018, Islam Channel Urdu was subsequently moved to channel 851, then 766, then 755, now 745. On 18 October 2022, Islam Channel Bangla was launched on Sky 784.

In 2021, Islam Channel launched new apps to offer enhanced VOD and live-streaming services.

Since its launch, the channel has expanded its range of programming, including programmes regarding current affairs, education, Islamic values, Islamic doctrine, entertainment, lifestyle and children's programming as well as domestic, financial and community related topics.

In March 2021, Islam Channel became a BARB reported channel and in April 2021, based on an analysis of BARB data, it was reported to be the top channel watched by British Asians during the first week of Ramadan.

== Popular programmes ==
There are a number of programmes which cover entertainment, current affairs, community activities, women's issues, and Islamic education including shows such as IC Kids, IslamiQA, the Review Show and Living the Life.

In 2021, its Review Show focused on dispelling fears amongst the Muslim community about COVID-19 vaccines.

Islam Channel hosts regular live charity appeals by its charity partners. In 2020 one such appeal raised £1.5 million in a single night's fundraising.

In November 2020, Islam Channel appointed its first female Head of Production, Mars El Brogy, who came from the Evening Standard and The Independent, where she had been head of video production. Previously, she had worked for the independent Maverick Television, as well as spending 5 years as a producer at the BBC.

== Conferences organised by Islam Channel ==
=== Islam Channel Business Awards ===
In 2019, Islam Channel held its first business awards, to celebrate and showcase the diversity and success of Muslim businesses and entrepreneurs in the UK. The awards ceremony was hosted by BBC London's Asad Ahmad and winners ranged across many business sectors from fashion to investment, travel to real estate, taking in businesses of all sizes. Ahmad was quoted as saying: "I am glad to support the Islam Channel Business Awards, which recognise leading Muslim businesses serving Britain. Their contribution is invaluable, employing millions of people and generating billions of pounds for the UK economy."

=== Global Peace and Unity ===
Islam Channel organised Global Peace and Unity events in London. The events were held over two days in 2005, 2006, 2007, 2008, 2010 and 2013. They were the largest such Muslim, interfaith and multicultural events in Europe, and in 2010 was attended by around 50,000 Muslims and non-Muslims. The aim of the event, according to the organisers, is to bring together people from all spheres of British society to inform and educate them about Islam and Muslims, and through this help to bridge the gaps between Muslims and non-Muslims.

=== Islamophobia: A Dilemma in the West ===
The Islam Channel convened a televised conference on Islamophobia held in Copenhagen on 13 May 2006. The conference was attended by 150 participants from countries around the world, with an audience of about 1,000, mostly Muslims. Speakers included Mohamed Ali Harrath, CEO of Islam Channel, Mayor of London Ken Livingstone, political analyst and journalist Yvonne Ridley, Yusuf Estes and Jamal Badawi.

== Controversy ==
=== Islam Channel founder awarded damages of £140,000 ===
In 2017, Mohamed Ali Harrath, founder of Islam Channel, was awarded £140,000 in libel damages against the Stand for Peace website and its director, Samuel Westrop, over false allegations that Mr Harrath was guilty of terrorism. The judge, Sir David Eady, stated in his judgment that: "there was simply no evidence to support the allegation of terrorism" and that "the sum awarded should be such as to leave interested onlookers in no doubt as to the baselessness of the Defendants' charge against [Mr Harrath]"

The poor treatment of Harrath by the British establishment and media was highlighted by Peter Oborne, chief political commentator of the Daily Telegraph in a 2012 article in the New Statesman.

=== Political impartiality ===
In 2007, Ofcom fined Islam Channel £30,000 for breaking the broadcasting code by having Yvonne Ridley present news programmes while standing as a candidate in local elections for the Respect Party during the previous year. Ofcom also condemned the channel for not providing requested recordings. In 2008, Ridley was awarded £20,532 in compensation and £5,000 in costs after an employment tribunal upheld her complaint that she was unfairly dismissed, was sexually discriminated against and harassed whilst working at the station.

Two cases from 2009 were also punished by Ofcom, for not including an Israeli perspective on discussion of the Arab-Israeli conflict.

Ofcom found the channel to be in breach of rules again in 2014. The program In Conversation with Lutfur Rahman, broadcast on 6 March gave politician Lutfur Rahman an unchallenged platform to promote himself.

=== Condoning of marital rape and violence ===
In November 2010, the channel was censured by Ofcom for allowing presenters to advocate marital rape and domestic abuse. A presenter is reported to have said during one programme: "it shouldn't be such a big problem where the man feels he has to force himself upon the woman", while in another a speaker told a viewer who was phoning in: "In Islam we have no right to hit the woman in a way that damages her eye or damages her tooth or damages her face or makes her ugly. Maximum what you can do, you can see the pen over here, in my hand, this kind of a stick can be used just to make her feel that you are not happy with her." The channel was not fined but Ofcom stated: "the advocacy of any form of violence (however limited)... is not acceptable" and that "it was highly likely that any advocacy and support at all of forced sexual relations would be offensive".

During the program Muslimah Dilemma, Western laws and freedoms were attacked, and that women should not be "permitted to hold a position of leadership in government".

=== Anwar Al-Awlaki ===
In 2010, it was reported that Islam Channel had in 2009 carried advertisements for at least two events at which radical al-Qaeda cleric Anwar Al-Awlaki's was due to be the star speaker via video link as well as for DVDs of his sermons. A spokeswoman for the channel stated that Al-Awlaki's sermons were in an online archive shared with many websites, and that Islam Channel has not at any time given a platform to Al-Awlaki. The channel removed the link.

== Awards and nominations ==
In February 2021, Islam Channel's founder, Mohamed Ali Harrath, was awarded the title of Global Muslim Media Person of the Year 2020 in Lagos, Nigeria, by Muslim News, the country's leading Islamic newspaper. The award was given by Mr. Rasheed Abubakar, the publisher of Muslim News and organiser of the prestigious awards, who was quoted as saying: "Establishing this type of medium which has a wide range of interesting and educative programmes for Muslims of different cultural backgrounds and nationalities and sustaining its quality since 2004 is a great feat that should be acknowledged, knowing full well how difficult it is to run a successful faith-based media outfit."

He hailed Harrath as a role model and inspiration saying: ""Harrath — who has been wrongly criticised; who fought and won against stereotypes and Islamophobic media, is a motivation and inspiration for us at Muslim News Nigeria, and to other young Muslim entrepreneurs who have or want to venture into the highly competitive media industry."

He added that Harrath had been an inspiration to Muslim News Nigeria in "celebrating Muslim achievers, promoting diversity, and countering anti-Muslim sentiments."

In January 2013, Islam Channel was nominated for the Responsible Media of the Year award at the British Muslim Awards. In January 2014 and 2015, the channel was awarded the Responsible Media of the Year award at the British Muslim Awards.

== See also ==
- List of Islamic television and radio stations in the United Kingdom
- Q TV
- Unity (Etihad) TV
- Channel S
- Peace TV
