= Zain Bhikha =

South African singer-songwriter

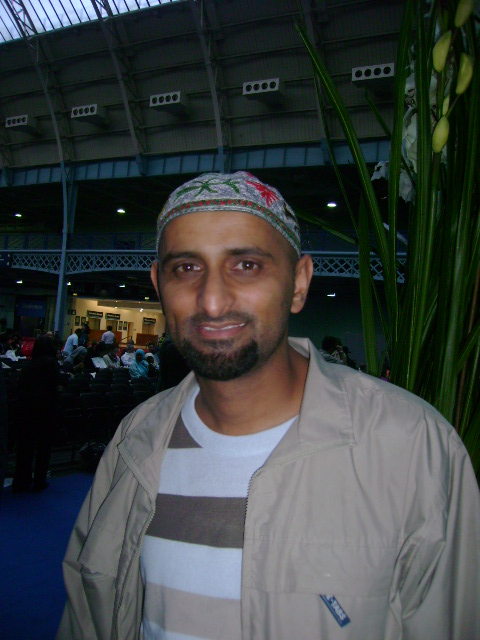
- Zain Bhikha in 2008

Background information
- Born: Pretoria, South Africa
- Origin: South African
- Genres: Islamic Nasheed
- Occupation: Singer-songwriter
- Years active: 1990–present
- Labels: Jamal Records/Mountain of Light
- Website: zainbhikha.com

Zain Bhikha is a South African singer-songwriter, vocalist, and drummer who performs Islamic nasheeds. Associated with other Muslim singers, including Yusuf Islam and Dawud Wharnsby, Bhikha has collaborated on albums and also released several solo albums.

Bhikha sometimes performs with a djembe or daf and several backup vocalists who were the African singers in the Disney cartoon movie The Lion King. He is widely known for the 2000 release A is for Allah.

== Current work ==
On 24 April 2008, Bhikha participated in an international annual singing competition, named the Al Mahabbah Awards Festival, in Abu Dhabi. Bhikha was accompanied by the aforementioned drummer and backing singers. One song they performed was "Peace Train", composed by Yusuf Islam.
