= IERA =

Islamic missionary group

Islamic Education and Research Academy (stylised as iERA)
- Founded: 2008
- Registration no.: 1134566 (charity); 06941044 (company)
- Purpose: education, research, Dawah
- Location: London, United Kingdom
- Revenue: £795,691 (2011) £882,810 (2012) £817,582 (2013) £711,179 (2014) £657,892 (2015) £696,299 (2016) £979,154 (2017)
- Employees: 6
- Volunteers: 35
- Website: iera.org

iERA (Islamic Education and Research Academy), is an Islamic missionary group founded in the United Kingdom by Anthony ("Abdur Raheem") Green in 2009 for proselytizing Islam.

== Management ==
iERA is registered as a charity in the UK. In addition, the charity was incorporated as a company on 23 June 2009. The charity is a company limited by guarantee. It has no share capital. (There was also a private limited company called "Islamic Education and Research Academy Ltd" ran by the same people who run iERA, which was registered as a company on 23 December 2008 as company number 06778858, and dissolved on 24 September 2013.)

In the year ending 30 June 2015, the charity's income and expenditure were as follows:

- Income: £657,892, made up of:
  - Voluntary: £637.8k
  - Charitable activities: £20.0k
- Spending: £634,946, made up of:
  - Generating voluntary income: £140.2k
  - Charitable activities: £463.7k
  - Governance £31.0k

=== Board of trustees ===
As a UK charity, iERA has registered trustees. The trustees in the period 2010 to 2016 were:

- Mr Anthony Waclaw G Green, chairman. Green is also known as "Abdurraheem Green".
- Mr Saqib Jameel Sattar, vice-chairman.
- Mr Nasser Ali Khan.
- Mr Tim J Chambers, listed as company secretary in the 2010–11, 2011–12 and 2013–14 accounts. Resigned 24 April 2015. Chambers is also known as "Yusuf Chambers".
- Mr KI Hussain. Retired/resigned 4 April 2014.
- Mrs SK Mirza, 2010–11 and 2011–12 accounts only.
- Ms S Mehdi, 2010–11 and 2011–12 accounts only.

The board of trustees oversee the running of the charity. They are not paid for their work as trustees (though did receive travel and subsistence expenses). The trustees are also directors of iERA for the purpose of company law. The charity pays staff and consultants to do the work of the charity. The charity has paid for the professional services of three of the trustees, and of the sister of one of the trustees.

== Activities ==
In 2010 iERA commissioned a study, undertaken by DJS Research, on negative perceptions of Islam and found that three-quarters of non-Muslims believe Islam was negative for Britain.

In September 2012 iERA wrote a lengthy critique challenging writer Tom Holland's Channel 4 documentary Islam: The Untold Story that questioned parts of the story of the origins of Islam. The Islamic Education and Research Academy said it was historically inaccurate and biased.

iERA projects its message in two main ways. One is by acting as a proactive organization, facilitating missionary activities to promote Islam. The other is by serving as an aggregating organization which coordinates and pays its affiliate preachers.

In March 2017, iERA like other organizations, released a statement condemning the Westminster Attack, saying, "iERA condemns the heinous attack in London that has resulted in the deaths of civilians and a Policeman. Our sincere condolences and prayers are with the families of the victims. In an age of hate and misunderstanding, iERA seeks to share the true message of Islam in an intelligent and compassionate way, thereby building bridges and removing enmity."

== Criticism and controversy ==
iERA has been the subject of controversy due to actions and statements made by the organisation and associated representatives. iERA claims that some of the controversy is based on statements that have been taken out of context, exaggerated or fabricated. In 2012 Green was barred from speaking at the Emirates Stadium following community concern and, in 2015, "after concern from the local community, including local Jewish people", he was banned from St. James's Park. On 30 November 2014, Andrew Gilligan reported in The Daily Telegraph that the several young men from the Hampshire city who traveled together to fight for Islamic State (ISIL) in Syria had at one time proselytized in the streets with iERA material on behalf of Mission Dawah, a team that is part of iERA. iERA responded by stating the individuals were not part of their organisation and followed up with an open letter to the editor challenging the report, saying that Gilligan quoted its speakers out of context and was "fuelling an atmosphere of hate and fear of Muslims".

=== Seating arrangements at UCL ===
iERA, under its platform The Big Debates, organised a debate on 9 March 2013 in a room iERA hired at University College London (UCL) between Lawrence Krauss and Hamza Andreas Tzortzis entitled "Islam or Atheism: Which Makes More Sense?". IERA's original intentions were to segregate the audience by gender. This was directly contrary to UCL policy, and UCL required the organisers to make it explicit to attendees that seating arrangements were optional, and guests were welcome to sit wherever they felt comfortable. However, UCL was notified by some individuals that attempts were made to enforce segregation at the meeting. Krauss was quoted on Twitter as saying that he almost "walked out of IERA debate as it ended up segregated." However, the debate went ahead as planned after seating arrangements were discarded.

Zayd Tutton of the iERA disputed Krauss' account of events. Tutton stated in HuffPost that "There were three sections as agreed with UCL prior to the debate. This was agreed clearly with UCL representatives. Muslim women choosing to adhere to orthodox Islamic principles in sitting in their own area had their own section. As for those who wanted to sit together, male or female, they had their own section where they freely mixed and sat together from the beginning." Tutton also said the "three kids" mentioned by Krauss were in fact two men who forcibly tried to sit in the female section, stating, "When arguing it was about sitting in any area in the auditorium, they were offered an entirely free aisle in the aforementioned Muslim female section, but insisted that they wanted to sit in between the Muslim females, with a view to offending their religious beliefs".

iERA has been banned from holding events at UCL, which concluded that iERA "had attempted to enforce segregation at the debate on 9 March" 2013. UCL released a statement stating that "We do not allow enforced segregation on any grounds [but] it now appears that, despite our clear instructions, attempts were made to enforce segregation at the meeting". The statement went on to say that "... their interests are contrary to UCL's ethos and that we should not allow any further events involving them to take place on UCL premises".

A report from Universities UK states that "concerns to accommodate the wishes or beliefs of those opposed to segregation should not result in a religious group being prevented from having a debate in accordance with its belief system ... if imposing an unsegregated seating area in addition to the segregated areas contravenes the genuinely held religious beliefs of the group hosting the event, or those of the speaker, the institution should be mindful to ensure that the freedom of speech of the religious group or speaker is not curtailed unlawfully."

=== Charities Commission investigation ===
In 2014, the Charity Commission started investigating the IERA over a number of "regulatory issues" surrounding its policies for organising events and inviting external speakers. Telegraph wrote that the iERA was being investigated by the Charity Commission "amid allegations that its leaders promote anti-Semitism and have called for homosexuals and adulterers to be stoned to death". The Charity Commission published its report in November 2016. The Charity was allowed to continue to operate even though "there has been misconduct and mismanagement in the charity's administration".

=== Controversial leaders and speakers ===
Hamza Tzortzis, a British Muslim convert of Greek heritage, was chairman of the launch event of iERA. He was at one time associated with extreme positions and extremists. Tzortzis has tried to distance himself from allegations of extremism and denies that he ever had such views, and says he preaches about peace and compassion. Zakir Naik was at one time an advisor to the iERA. Naik is an Indian Islamic preacher, who has been banned from entering the UK amid security concerns. Bilal Philips is or was an advisor to iERA. Philips is a Canadian Muslim teacher, speaker, and author who lives in Qatar. He has been banned or deported from Britain. Monitoring of the iERA website by the Charity Commission in 2014-15 identified a partnership between iERA and an organisation founded by Philips. iERA vice-chairman responded by stating the organisation has mechanisms in place to manage risk and demonstrate compliance. As a result of a regulatory order by the Charity Commission, iERA "has ceased all working relationships with the organisation and have no intention to collaborate or partner with it in the future... furthermore, the board of trustees will inform the Commission in advance if they do plan to work with the organisation in the future and seek its counsel".
