= Huda TV =

Islamic free-to-air channel in English

Huda Tv
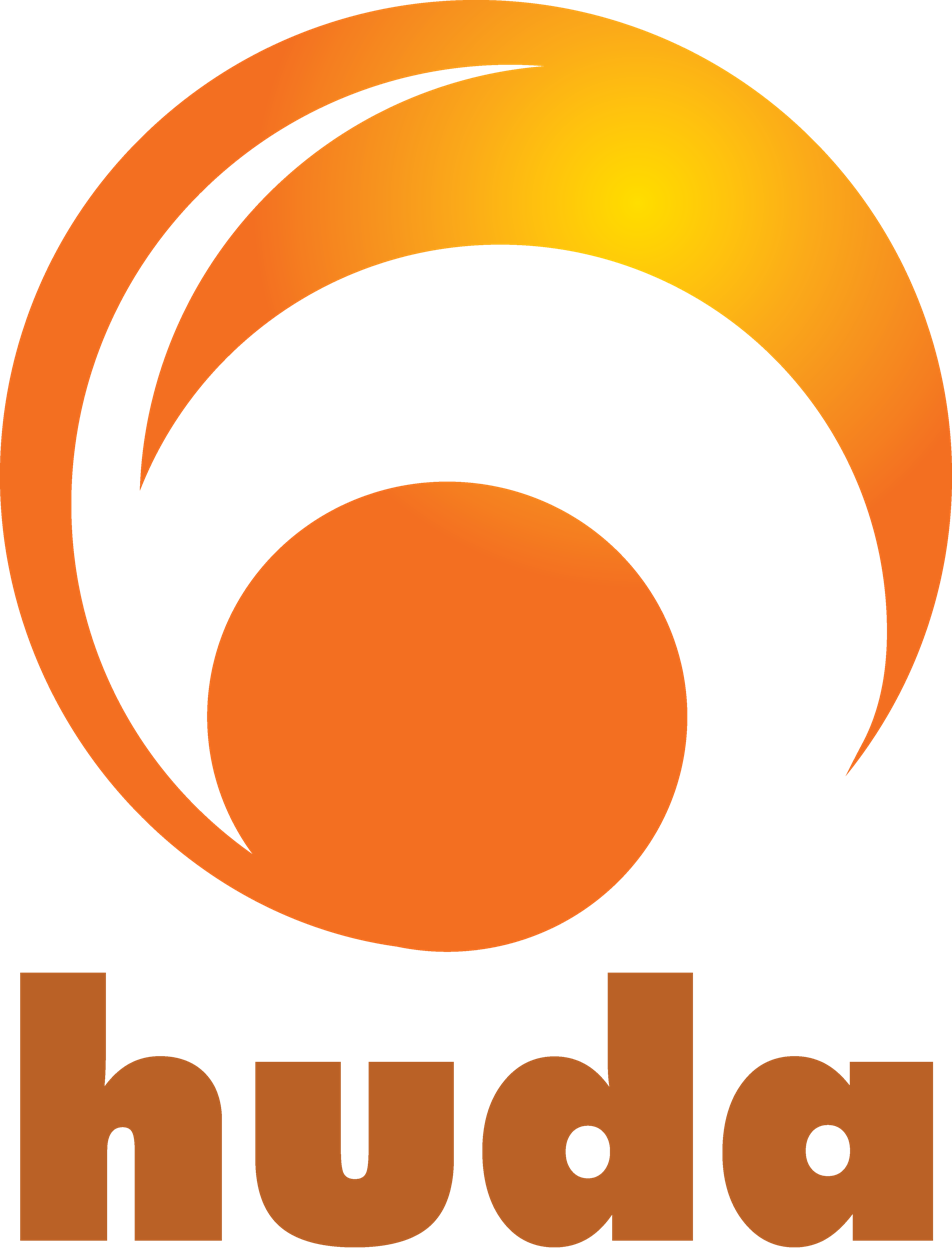
- Country: Egypt
- Broadcast area: Worldwide
- Affiliates: The Muslim Company
- Headquarters: 6th of October City, Egypt

Programming
- Language: English

Ownership
- Owner: Egyptian Media Production City
- Key people: Yusuf Estes, Zakir Naik, Abu Usamah at-Thahabi, Bilal Philips, Assim Al-Hakeem

History
- Launched: 2005

Links
- Website: huda.tv

Availability

Streaming media
- huda.tv: live streaming

Huda TV, formerly known is Zee Huda, is an Egyptian satellite television and internet television channel free-to-air, broadcasting English-language Islamic content. It was launched in 2005.

== Content and programs ==
- Gems of the Heart
- Ask Huda
- Gardens of the Pious
- Correct your Recitation
- Hajj Impressions
- Quran Circle
- How He Treated Them
- Inspirations

== Frequency ==
The current frequency is Intelsat 20, frequency 4149.5, Symbol rate 14400, 3/4 Horizontal. The previous frequencies were Galaxy 19 @ 97W, Frequency 12184, Transponder 28, Symbol rate 22000, FEC 3/4, Polarisation: Horizontal; and Nilesat, frequency 11566, polarization: horizontal, Symbol rate 27500, FEC 3/4.

=== Speakers ===
- Yusuf Estes
- Zakir Naik
- Abu Usamah at-Thahabi
- Bilal Philips
- Assim Al-Hakeem

== See also ==
- Islamic television networks
