= Peace TV =

Islamic television channel

- Country: United Arab Emirates
- Broadcast area: Worldwide
- Network: Peace TV Media Network
- Affiliates: The Muslim Company

Programming
- Language: English
- Picture format: 1080i (HDTV)

Ownership
- Owner: Zakir Naik (Founder and CEO)
- Key people: Zakir Naik (CEO of Peace TV)
- Sister channels: Peace TV Urdu; Peace TV Bangla; Peace TV Albanian (defunct); Peace TV Chinese (defunct)

History
- Launched: 21 January 2006

Links
- Website: peacetv.tv

Peace TV is an Emirati satellite television network that broadcasts free-to-air programming. It is one of the world's largest religious satellite television networks. On 21 January 2006, Zakir Naik created the network, which is based in Dubai.

The network has broadcast all over the world. Naik regards the network as a 'edutainment' channel. Peace TV was also available free-to-air on the LiveStation satellite television provider.

On the basis of hate-speech laws, Naik's Peace TV was banned from broadcasting in India, Bangladesh and Sri Lanka. The channel pulled out of the UK in 2020 after it was fined for inciting murder. Peace TV has reached 200 million viewers. As of August 2019, Peace TV's app was still available in the banned countries, including India, via a free app in the Google Play Store that had been downloaded more than 100,000 times.

== History ==
Peace TV was founded on 21 January 2006. One of the first network broadcasts was Zakir Naik's debate on the "Concept of God". The debate was broadcast live on Peace TV. It was launched on Arabsat's BADR-3 satellite in October 2006. In June 2009, Peace TV English became the first religious satellite channel to broadcast in HD resolution. The same month, Pakistan launched Peace TV Urdu. In 2009, the Islamic Research Foundation International donated £1.25 million to the station. Peace TV Bangla was launched on 22 April 2011 in Bangladesh for Bengali-speaking viewers. Peace TV Chinese began broadcasting Islamic programming in China in October 2015. Peace TV Albanian, Europe's first Peace TV channel, was launched on 20 August 2009 from Pristina, Kosovo.

After receiving reports that the station was broadcasting hate speech, the UK broadcasting regulator Ofcom investigated it in 2011.

In 2012, Ofcom ruled the channel broke broadcasting rules which states offensive comments should be justified by the context. It was ruled on the following statements which were broadcast on 8 March 2012 on the Dare to Ask programme:

"One group of scholars, they say that if a Muslim, if he becomes a non-Muslim [inaudible] he should be put to death. There is another group of scholars who say that if a Muslim becomes a non-Muslim and propagates his new faith against Islam then he should be put to death." "I tend to agree more with the second group of scholars, who say that a Muslim, if he becomes a non-Muslim and propagates his new faith against Islam, that is the time this penalty is applied."

In response, Peace TV stated that they were simply repeating the teachings of the Quran. The channel has been broadcasting in India since 2006, but it failed to register with India's Ministry of Information and Broadcasting in 2009, making it illegal. Hathway ceased broadcasting on the channel. Zakir Naik denies ownership of the station and claims it is run by a Dubai-based company. Peace TV was banned in India in 2012 because the government claimed it broadcast malicious anti-Indian content. Naik has denied any connection to such claims and hopes that the ban will be lifted.

Following the Dhaka terror attack, there was a heated debate in Bangladesh about whether or not to broadcast Peace TV. On 10 July 2016, the Government of Bangladesh blocked the channel after consulting with its internal security services.

Following the Easter Sunday attacks in Sri Lanka in April 2019, which killed at least 250 people, the Sri Lankan cable TV operators were ordered to delete Peace TV as part of an inquiry into Islamic extremism.

As a result of such events, Peace TV argues that their comments have been taken out of context multiple times.

== Awards and nominations ==
In January 2013, Peace TV was nominated for the Responsible Media of the Year award at the British Muslim Awards.

== Controversies ==
A major controversy erupted after the Dhaka terror attack in July 2016 when the investigations revealed that a terrorist involved in the brutal killings followed Naik's page on Facebook and was influenced by his speeches which seemed to be provocative in nature. The terrorist had posted sermons of Naik on social media where Naik has urged "all Muslims to be terrorists" saying "if he is terrorizing a terrorist, he is following Islam".

Following this incident, the channel was banned in Bangladesh. Hasanul Haq Inu, the Information Minister of Bangladesh reasoned that "Peace TV is not consistent with Muslim society, the Quran, Sunnah, Hadith, Bangladesh's Constitution, our culture, customs and rituals."

In March 2018, during a show called Strengthening Your Family, The Valley of the Homosexuals, presenter Imam Qasim Khan said that homosexuality was "a very unnatural type of love that is energised by the influence of [Satan]" and called AIDS "a disease [that gay men] contracted because they are homosexual". Khan went on to say, "Even an animal that is defiled by Islam, the pig – as nasty and corrupted and contaminated as a pig is – you never see two male pigs that are trying to have sex together. That's insanity… worse than animals."

In July 2019, Ofcom ruled that three of Peace TV's programmes, including Khan's aforementioned broadcast, breached its rules on hate speech, offence, abusive treatment and incitement to crime. In a statement, the regulator said: "Ofcom considered the breaches in this case to be serious. We are putting the Licensee on notice that we will consider these breaches for the imposition of a statutory sanction." Lord Production, which owns Peace TV's broadcast licence, defended the broadcast, claiming that it did not breach Ofcom's rules. The company claimed that Khan merely offered "a robust stand against homosexuality, but very much from a religious standpoint." It disagreed with Ofcom's suggestion that Imam Khan's views constituted hate speech arguing that he did not “call for violence or punishment of homosexuals” and that his aim was to "outlaw the practice of homosexuality itself". The channel pulled out of the UK in 2020 after it was fined £300,000 for inciting murder.

Broadcasting restrictions on Peace TV
Country	Status	Date	Notes
India	Banned	December 2012	Broadcasting anti-India programmes 'not conducive to the security environment in the country'.
Bangladesh	Banned	July 2016	Promotion of terrorism (after July 2016 Dhaka attack)
Sri Lanka	Banned	May 2019	Promotion of terrorism (after 2019 Sri Lanka Easter bombings)
Canada	Banned	Nov 2022	Reasons Unclear

== Notable staff and presenters ==
- From India
  - Zakir Naik
- From the United States
  - Yusuf Estes
- From Canada
  - Bilal Philips
  - Jamal Badawi
- Others
  - Abdur Raheem Green
  - Hussein Ye
  - Israr Ahmed
  - Assim Al-Hakeem

== Logos ==
Logo consisting "Earth" (2006–2015)

Logo consisting "Salam" (2015–present)
