= Assim al-Hakeem =

Saudi Arabian Scholar (born 1962)

Sheikh Assim al-Hakeem
- عاصم الحكيم
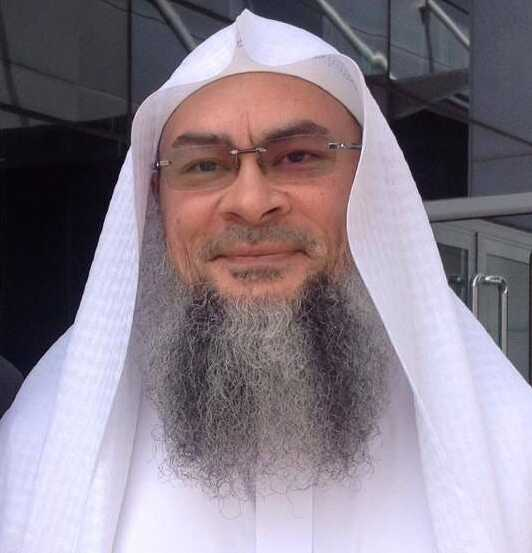
- Al-Hakeem in 2024

Personal life
- Born: Assim bin Luqman al-Hakeem; 23 November 1962 (age 63) Khobar, Saudi Arabia
- Children: 13
- Education: King Fahd University of Petroleum and Minerals (dropped out); King Abdulaziz University; Umm al-Qura University
- Occupation: Cleric
- Website: www.assimalhakeem.net

Religious life
- Religion: Islam
- Denomination: Sunni
- Jurisprudence: Hanbali
- Creed: Athari
- Movement: Salafism

Muslim leader
- Influenced by: Muhammad ibn Abd al-Wahhab; Ibn Baz; Al-Albani; Ibn Uthaymin; Abdul-Rahman bin Nasir al-Barrak; Muhammad ibn Saleh al-Munajjid

YouTube information
- Channel: assimalhakeem
- Genre: Islamic
- Subscribers: 1.43 million
- Views: 407.7 million
- Last updated: 1 November 2026

Assim bin Luqman al-Hakeem (Arabic: عاصم بن لقمان الحكيم, romanized: ʿĀṣim ibn Luqmān al-Ḥakīm; born 23 November 1962) is a Saudi Arabian cleric. He is based primarily in the city of Jeddah, where he preaches Sunni Islam with a Salafist approach mostly in English, delivering programs on social media channels.

== Early life and education ==
Assim bin Luqman al-Hakeem was born on 23 November 1962 in Khobar, Saudi Arabia. He is of Batak descent; his grandfather was a Mandailing Batak who lived in Medan and worked as a judge in the Sultanate of Deli at that time. Al-Hakeem's grandfather sent Luqman, Al-Hakeem's father, to Saudi Arabia to study religion, and later he obtained Saudi citizenship; thus, Al-Hakeem grew up in Saudi Arabia.

At the age of 12, al-Hakeem moved with his family to Jeddah, where he developed an early interest in Islamic studies. After completing high school in 1980, he initially enrolled at King Fahd University of Petroleum and Minerals but later left the programme. He subsequently pursued a degree in English literature at King Abdulaziz University, graduating with a Bachelor of Arts in 1987. In 1998, he completed a Higher Diploma in Islamic Studies at Umm al-Qura University. Alongside his formal education, he spent several years studying under and benefiting from the scholarly works and teachings of the Saudi scholar Muhammad ibn al-Uthaymin.

== Career ==
Al-Hakeem began his career as a high school English teacher in 1988. He has been an imam in Jeddah for the last 20 years, where he delivers weekly sermons before Friday prayer and lectures on various Islamic sciences.

He mostly preaches in English, delivering Islamic programs on social media channels, including Questions and Answers (ASK HUDA), Umdatul Ahkaam, Youth Talk, and Mercy to the Worlds. He also preaches on television and radio channels, such as Huda TV, Zad TV, Peace TV, Iqraa, and Saudi 2.

== Views ==
=== Islamic jurisprudence ===
==== Quran as alternative medicine ====
Al-Hakeem has said of the Islamic practice of ruqyah, a form of litany associated with the exorcism of evil spirits in Islam, that "it is the recitation of the Qur'an, seeking of refuge in Allah, remembrance and supplications that are used as a means of treating sicknesses and other problems, as the Qur'an is a source of healing". He has also advocated reciting the Qur'an over water and then drinking and washing with it as a means of healing.

==== Shortening or combining prayers ====
Al-Hakeem has said that, with regards to the Islamic practice of shortening or combining prayer during travel, a person who travels daily or frequently "will not be considered a traveller for the purpose of shortening of Salah and combining them unless a valid reason exists."

==== Pilgrimage to Mecca ====
Al-Hakeem has critiqued Islamic pilgrims taking pictures of themselves while on the hajj, stating: "Taking such selfies and videos defy the wish of our Prophet."

=== Politics and societal issues ===
==== Women ====
While acknowledging that disagreement exists among scholars, he considers the most authentic opinion to be that female circumcision is recommended but it is neither mandatory nor forbidden. He holds that women are not allowed to work in mixed-gender environments.

When asked about the legality of concubinage in Islam, Al-Hakeem considered the enslavement of prisoners of war humane, if given the rights afforded to slaves in Islam, and affirmed the legality of concubinage.

==== Protests ====
Al-Hakeem has claimed that all forms of protests are prohibited in Islam, a view that aligns with the Madkhali and quietist strains of Salafism. His views came under criticism by many Muslim users, with many citing Quranic principles of standing up against injustice, even were it to be from one’s own family.

==== Conspiracy theories ====
When discussing conspiracy theories and the movements associated with them (such as the Freemasons and the Illuminati), Al-Hakeem explained that despite the fact that knowing about such things is not fundamentally useful in Islam and could even be potentially harmful since attributing inordinate power to such groups makes Muslims feel weak, "We acknowledge that through history the Jews collaborating with the hypocrites had many conspiracies against Islam...the collaboration and the fingerprints of the Jews, the hypocrites, and the Rafidah is evident. And this does not prevent them from collaborating over the centuries to continue their dirty work." Al-Hakeem explained that since Jews are a minority, it is their nature to dominate and control whatever they can, and this is why they control the media and the financial sector today.

Al-Hakeem has engaged in Holocaust denial and has antisemitic views on history.

==== Cryptocurrency ====
Al-Hakeem considers bitcoin haram. He had pointed out its anonymous and ambiguous nature and said it could be used for illegal activities such as money laundering and drug money, and has warned against people using such transactions as the nature of seeking to gain money quickly in such a manner (via a means akin to gambling) is fundamentally un-Islamic.

== Relations with the Saudi government ==
The ultra-conservative views of al-Hakeem have been described as being at odds with Crown Prince Mohammed bin Salman's projected image of Saudi Arabia, which includes that of religious tolerance, inter-faith dialogue, modernisation, and support of women's professional and personal opportunities. Despite holding ultra-conservative views, al-Hakeem has shied away from openly criticizing Mohammed or the government, as most Saudi scholars have chosen to remain silent or publicly endorse Mohammed's policies to avoid arrest.

== Reception and controversies ==
=== Salafi criticism ===
Some Salafists have criticised al-Hakeem for allegedly deviating from mainstream Sunni orthodoxy and misleading youth toward extremist ideologies under the guise of traditional scholarship. Critics have faulted him for declining to publicly warn against figures they deem deviant or extremist, such as Ahmad Musa Jibril and Yasir Qadhi—on the grounds that public refutations waste time and tarnish reputations—while allegedly displaying hypocrisy and poor manners by using abusive language and belittling prominent Salafi scholars like Rabi' al-Madkhali. Additionally, detractors have condemned his association with, promotion of, and teaching on media and educational platforms operated by preachers they label as religious innovators, including Mufti Menk, Zakir Naik (Peace TV), Muhammad al-Munajjid (ZAD Academy), and Bilal Philips (Islamic Online University). Finally, these critics accuse him of linking followers to revolutionary Khawarij ideology by teaching a text authored by Abd al-Aziz al-Tarifi, indirectly promoting the ideas of Sayyid Qutb through al-Munajjid, and denying an established scholarly consensus (ijma) against rebelling against Muslim rulers.

=== Cancelled speaking engagements ===
In 2012, al-Hakeem was barred from speaking at an event for the Islamic Society at the University of Hertfordshire due to his controversial statements about homosexuality. Raheem Kassam, the director of Student Rights said: "It is encouraging that vile views such as those espoused by al-Hakeem are not tolerated at Hertfordshire University. They would not be tolerated in open society and nor should university students be subjected to them. We're delighted that what should be 'common sense' has prevailed this time – but all too often preachers like al-Hakeem are paraded around university campuses as 'experts' and manage to disseminate their hateful ideas, dressing them up as scripture and radicalising young people. It has to stop." Talks by Al-Hakeem at Sheffield Hallam University were also cancelled.

In 2024, a Sunday Penny Appeal charity event featuring al-Hakeem in Montreal, Canada was not hosted at the Rialto Theatre as originally planned after the Centre for Israel and Jewish Affairs (CIJA) and B'nai B'rith Canada expressed concern about the preacher. Penny Appeal Canada website pages and Instagram, Facebook, and TikTok posts about al-Hakeem and his tour were also removed. The Eventbrite pages for the Montreal event, as well as upcoming events in London and Vancouver, were also deleted following the theatre’s decision. B'nai B'rith called on other venues not to host al-Hakeem, because of his "hate-filled and extremist views". John Rustad, Leader of the Conservative Party of British Columbia, strongly condemned the scheduled appearance of al-Hakeem, stating, "The extremist and hateful rhetoric of Assim al-Hakeem has no place here. His views are antithetical to the values that British Columbians hold dear. Al-Hakeem's history of promoting anti-Semitism, misogyny, and homophobia makes him a dangerous figure who should not be welcomed in our communities."

== Personal life ==
Al-Hakeem is known to be a father to 13 children; all daughters. He has had 2 wives over a 25-year span, divorcing 1 of them around a decade ago.
