= List of Muslim comparative theologians =

Notable Muslim comparative theologians, Muslim scholars or preachers engaged in Islamic comparative religion studies include:

- Ahmad Deedat
- Zakir Naik
- Hafiz Muhammad Shariq
- Abū Rayhān al-Bīrūnī
- Abdullahi Aliyu Sumaila
- Fakhr al-Din al-Razi
- Ibn Hazm
- Abu al-Hasan al-Ash'ari
- Rahmatullah Kairanawi
- Ismail al-Faruqi
- Abu Ammaar Yasir Qadhi
- Shabir Ally
- Taqi Usmani
- Abobaker Mojadidi
- Abul A'la Maududi
- Jamal Badawi
- Amir Hussain Editor of the Journal of the American Academy of Religion
- Hamza Andreas Tzortzis
- Abdur Raheem Green
- Hamza Yusuf

== See also ==
- List of Islamic jurists
