= Lists of Islamic scholars =

Lists of Islamic scholars include:

== Lists ==
- List of contemporary Islamic scholars
- List of converts to Islam who are Islamic scholars
- List of female Islamic scholars
- List of hadith authors and commentators
- List of Islamic jurists
- List of Islamic scholars described as father or founder of a field
- List of Muslim astronomers
- List of Muslim comparative theologians
- List of Muslim historians
- List of Muslim mathematicians
- List of Muslim philosophers
- List of Muslim theologians
- List of pre-modern Arab scientists and scholars
- List of Quran interpreters
- List of Quran reciters
- List of scientists in medieval Islamic world
- List of Shia Muslim scholars of Islam

== See also ==
- Ulama, guardians, transmitters, and interpreters of religious knowledge in Islam
- Allamah, Islamic honorary title for a scholar
- Mullah, Muslim clergy or mosque leader
- List of da'is
- List of pre-modern Arab scientists and scholars
- List of pre-modern Iranian scientists and scholars
- List of Turkish philosophers and scientists
- Islamic philosophy
  - Early Islamic philosophy
- Islamic advice literature
- Lists of maraji
- List of ayatollahs
