= List of converts to Islam who are Islamic scholars =

The following is a list of Islamic scholars who are Converts to Islam.

- Abdalqadir as-Sufi
- Abdul Halim Pardede
- Bilal Philips
- Frithjof Schuon
- Hamza Yusuf
- Hussein Ye
- Ibn Yaḥyā al-Maghribī al-Samawʾal
- Ivan Aguéli
- Joel Hayward
- John Mohammed Butt
- Joseph E. B. Lumbard
- Khalid Blankinship
- Khalid Yasin
- Malcolm X
- Marmaduke Pickthall
- Martin Lings
- Maryam Jameelah
- Maurice Bucaille
- Michael Wolfe
- Muhammad Asad
- Nuh Keller
- Roger Garaudy
- Rene Guenon
- Siraj Wahaj
- Sherman Jackson
- Suhaib Webb
- Timothy Winter
- Ubaidullah Sindhi
- Warith Deen Mohammed
- Zaid Shakir
