= International Open University =

Private distance-learning institute

- Logo of the International Open University
- Former name: Islamic Online University
- Motto: Changing the Nation Through Education
- Type: Private
- Established: 2007; 19 years ago
- Accreditation: NAQAA (National Accreditation and Quality Assurance Authority)
- Chancellor: Bilal Philips
- Vice-Chancellor: Prof Dr Makie Taal
- Students: 26,682 (spring 2020)
- Location: 21 Kanifing Mosque Road, P.O. Box 2340, Kanifing South, KMC, The Gambia
- Campus: Online
- Website: http://iou.edu.gm/

The International Open University (IOU) is a private distance education university headquartered in Kanifing, The Gambia. It was founded by Bilal Philips, in 2007 and offers undergraduate and graduate degrees.

== History ==
The university was Initially established in 2001, but temporarily ceased operations. In April 2007, it reopened under the name Islamic Online University with a greater offering of completely free short courses. On January 13, 2020, it was announced that the institution's name has been changed to the International Open University.

Ernest Bai Koroma, the chancellor of the University of Sierra Leone (USL) welcomed the idea of establishing the IOU type Islamic institution. In 2014, the Niger State Government paid the International Open University's Bachelor of Arts school fees for 35 students that registered from the state.

As of 2018, the International Open University is amongst the most ethnically diverse universities in the world.

In 2018, the International Open University's programs were ranked among the six best online Middle Eastern Studies programs by Successful Student, although by June 2020 they had been removed from this list.

In 2021, the online Kenyan newspaper Tuko ranked the International Open University among the top accredited distance learning universities in Africa, along with the University of Johannesburg, the University of Zambia, the University of South Africa, the University of Nairobi and the University of Pretoria, in addition to few other universities.

In November 2022, the IOU Chancellor Dr. Bilal Philips paid a courtesy visit to Adama Barrow, the President of the Gambia, and offered scholarships worth USD 4,000,000 for education of underprivileged Gambians at the International Open University.

== Affiliations ==
The International Open University is a full member of Association of African Universities, approved member of International Council for Open and Distance Education, African Quality Assurance Network (AfriQAN), Association of Quality Assurance Agencies of the Islamic World (IQA), associate member of International Network for Quality Assurance Agencies in Higher Education (INQAAHE), Asian Association of Open Universities, as well as a member of International Council of Islamic Finance Educators (ICIFE) and a member of the Talloires Network.

== Research ==
The International Open University launched a multidisciplinary peer-reviewed journal, Journal of Integrated Sciences, in 2019.

Professor Dr. G. Hussein Rassool, the dean for the Faculty of Liberal Arts and Sciences, head of the Department of Psychology, Director of Research and Publications and Professor of Islamic Psychology at the International Open University is editor-in-chief of the journal.

== Community service ==
The International Open University has set a mandatory community service for the students as a part of graduation requirements. In order to graduate, in addition to academic requirements, students are mandated to complete 216 hours of community service.
