= Sharjah Award for Voluntary Work =

Volunteer award in the UAE

- Awarded for: "educate the public about volunteer work, volunteer opportunities, and how to participate in volunteer programmes offered by institutions, as well as to help promote the culture of volunteerism in society"
- Date: 2011; 15 years ago
- Country: United Arab Emirates
- Presented by: Emirate of Sharjah

Sharjah Award for Voluntary Work (SAVW) is an award bestowed by the government of the United Arab Emirates to recognize the contributions of the works of volunteers in both public and private sectors. It is the first of its kind in the UAE and the Arab world bestowed annually by the sovereign ruler of the Emirate of Sharjah. It is administered by the Sharjah Award for Voluntary Work's board of trustees.

It is bestowed upon any individual, institution, groups, and organisations, including in public and private sectors. It is focused on recognizing volunteer work such as spreading awareness programs concerning volunteer initiatives offered by government and NGOs.

== History ==
It was established in 2001 by the decree no. 2 issued by the member of the Federal Supreme Council and ruler of Sharjah, Sultan bin Muhammad Al-Qasimi.

The Sharjah Award for Voluntary Work was constituted to recognize the significant contributions of the public and private vendors in the field of volunteer work, including in social, humanitarian and education fields across the UAE and the Arab world.

== Recipients ==
- 2020: Sharjah Islamic Bank
- 2020: American University of Sharjah (AUS)
- 2019: Sharjah City for Humanitarian Services (SCHS) general director, Mona Abdel Karim
- 2014: Easa Saleh Al Gurg Group LLC chairperson, Easa Saleh Al Gurg
- 2013: Zakir Naik
