= Bilal Philips =

Canadian Islamic scholar (born 1947)

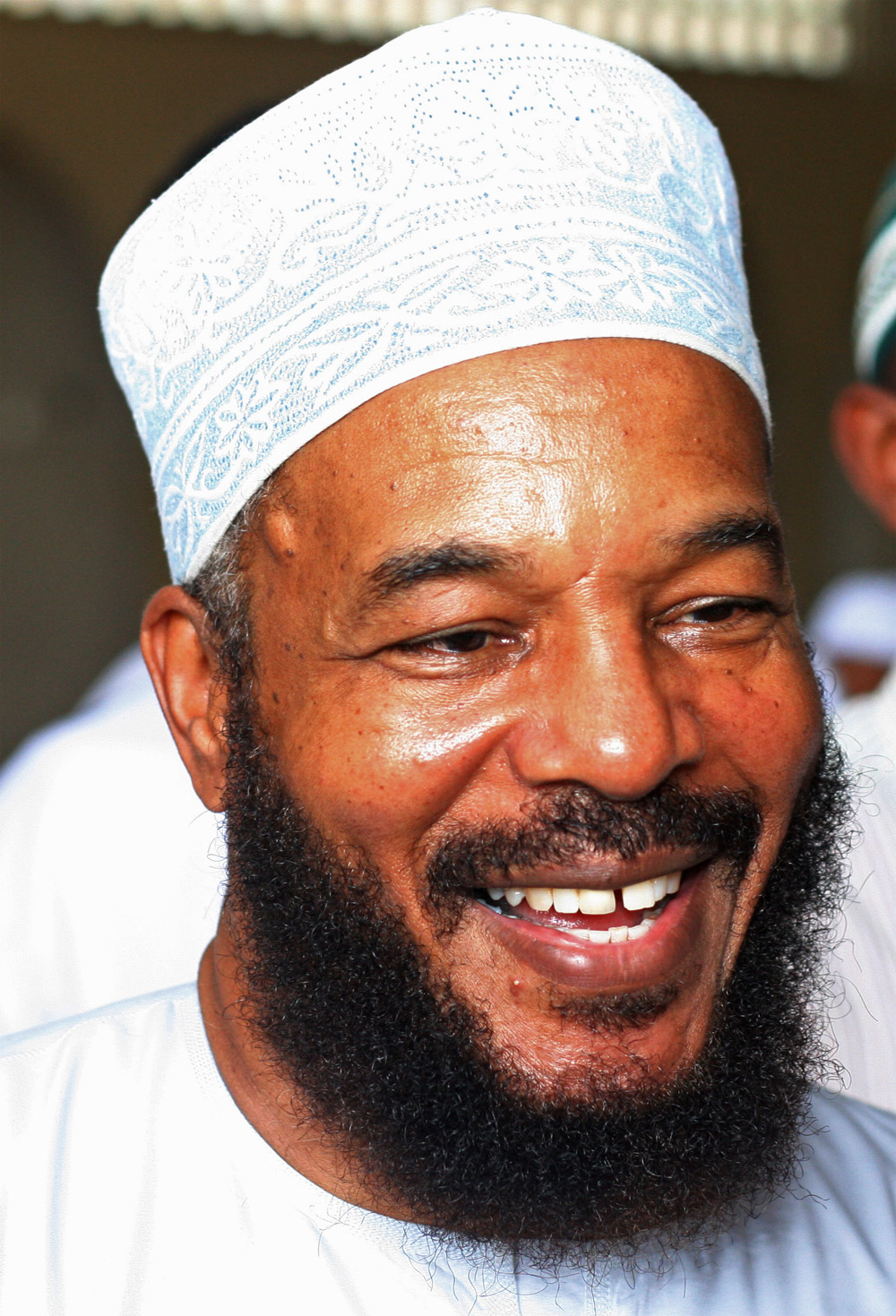
- Philips in August 2010

Personal life
- Born: Dennis Bradley Philips; July 17, 1947 (age 79) Kingston, Jamaica
- Notable idea: Founder of International Open University
- Education: Islamic University of Medina (B.A.); King Saud University (M.A.); University of Wales (Ph.D.)
- Occupation: Islamic scholar
- Honors: The 500 Most Influential Muslims (2009–2022)
- Website: bilalphilips.com

Religious life
- Religion: Islam
- Denomination: Sunni
- Creed: Athari
- Movement: Salafi

YouTube information
- Channel: Bilal Philips
- Years active: 2012–present
- Subscribers: 161 thousand
- Views: 5.41 million
- Last updated: 20 February 2026

Abu Ameenah Bilal Philips (born Dennis Bradley Philips; July 17, 1947) is a Jamaican-born Canadian Islamic scholar and author who is the founder and chancellor of the International Open University, and who lives in Qatar. He has been described as a Salafi who advocates a traditional, literal form of Islam.

He has written, translated and commented on over 50 Islamic books translated into multiple languages and available online, and has appeared or presented on numerous national and satellite television channels, including Saudi TV, Sharjah TV, Ajman TV, Islam Channel, Huda TV, and Peace TV.

Throughout his career, Philips has become the subject of many controversies, resulting in him being banned from entering the United Kingdom, Australia, Denmark and Kenya, banned from re-entering Germany, ordered to leave Bangladesh, and deported from the Philippines. He was also named by the US government as an unindicted co-conspirator in the 1993 World Trade Center bombing. Despite restrictions put on him by Western states, his "ideas and activism are important in understanding Salafism" in the West and among the African diaspora.

== Biography ==
=== Early life ===
Philips was born in Kingston, Jamaica, to high school teachers Bradley Philips and Joyce McDermott. Philips has one brother and one sister, as well as an adopted brother. Philips was raised a Christian, with his mother being an Anglican and his father a Presbyterian.

Philips spent the first 11 years of childhood in Jamaica, before migrating to Toronto, Ontario, Canada. He attended Jarvis Collegiate Institute for junior high and Northview Heights Collegiate Institute for high school from 1962 to 1965. Philips moved with his family to Sabah, East Malaysia in 1964, as his parents were part of the Colombo Plan.

=== Education ===
Philips attended Simon Fraser University in Vancouver from 1967 to 1970, where he took biochemistry. Philips had been interested in communism and black nationalism in school, but encountered Islam several times in his travels. The book that won him over was Islam, The Misunderstood Religion by Muhammad Qutb (brother of Sayyid Qutb). He converted to Islam in February 1972, giving Shahada in the presence of Abdullah Hakim Quick.

He received his B.A. degree from the Islamic University of Madinah in 1979 and his M.A. in ʿAqīdah (Islamic Theology) from the King Saud University in Riyadh in 1985, then to the University of Wales, St. David's University College (now University of Wales, Trinity Saint David). There at the Lampeter Campus he completed his 1993 PhD thesis, Exorcism in Islam.

=== Preaching and career ===
Philips taught Islamic studies for a decade at Manarat al-Riyadh School in Riyadh and was an Arabic and Islamic studies teacher in the American University of Dubai for 10 years as well. He also lectures at the Ajman University (AU) in the United Arab Emirates. Philips set up an Islamic Studies department of Preston University in Ajman in 2002 and set up the Islamic Studies Academy in Qatar in 2007.

During the First Gulf War, Philips organized Islamic religious revival meetings for U.S. troops stationed in Dammam, Saudi Arabia, during which (according to Philips) over three thousand soldiers converted to Islam. According to counter-extremism author J.M. Berger, some of the US military men and women who participated in his revival program were later recruited as volunteer trainers in the 1992–95 Bosnian War. Philips founded and taught at the Islamic Information Center in Dubai, under the Dar al Ber Society, and in Qatar he was an Islamic consultant and lecturer for the Islamic Information wing of Sheikh Eid Charity.

==== Islamic Online University ====
Philips founded the Islamic Online University in Qatar in the year of 2001.

== Views ==
=== Western culture/civilization ===
Bilal Philips has called himself a "moderate" in protest against allegations that he is an extremist, calling the accusations "appalling" and "baseless". According to The Courier-Mail newspaper (of Brisbane Australia), he "once wrote, 'Western culture, led by the United States, is the enemy of Islam'". Philips denied this in an interview in the Muslim online magazine MuslimMatters.org, (Note: reprinted in Austrolabe.) claiming the statement comes from Samuel P. Huntington's ideas in his work the Clash of Civilisations, about the efforts of "globalized western civilization" to "impose" their "culture throughout the world".

Nonetheless, he is highly critical of Western society, alleging that western news magazines have proclaimed that "western culture and society is dying", listing as evidence the rise of wife swapping, teenage and illegitimate births, sexually transmitted disease; and that what westerners see as "progress" and "sophistication" is actually the "death throes" of western civilization. The Counter Extremism Project quotes him as saying "... Europeans, ... had gone around and smashed up everybody else's society, so they had to justify the destruction of human civilization by promoting their own superiority over others. Those feelings are expressed in much of their literature, in films, on television and so forth." He is on record as calling Jews "filth", according to the Jewish Chronicle.

=== Monotheism/Tawheed ===
Philips stresses that tawheed (monotheism) is of crucial importance in Islamic belief and "the basis" of the religion of Islam, in his work The Fundamentals of Tawheed. Those who have deviated from Islam, joining or founding heretical sects, try to "neutralize" tawheed. Philips warns that some seek the "destruction of Islam and misguidance of its followers", but being unable to oppose and destroy Islam militarily, "outwardly" pretend to accept Islam while working in secret "to destroy the religion from within".

Monotheism may be defined as the belief that there is only one God, but actually involves much more. Some of the concepts of tawhid (Philips believes) include:

- Predestination (qadar), the belief that all of life's events have been determined ("written") by God ahead of time. Whether an occurrence appears to be good fortune or bad fortune, fair and unfair, appears to be logical or make no sense at all, it is all part of God's plan. Believers will experience "fear, hunger, loss of wealth and life" (Q.2:155) as tests from God. Consequently, common popular habits that might appear to be harmless — believing in charms, amulets, and omens (rabbits' feet, black cats, broken mirrors) as good or bad luck — are actually "grave sins" against tawheed.
- Opposition to belief in "free will" (jabriyya). The idea (that human beings have a "free will") may have infiltrated Islam from an early Christian convert. (Note: The question of how to reconcile God's absolute power with human responsibility for their actions, led to "one of the earliest sectarian schisms" in Islam, between the Qadarites (aka Qadariyah), who believed in total free will of humans (and who appeared in Damascus around the end of the seventh century CE); and the Jabriyya, who believed in "absolute" divine "determinism and fatalism". An Islamic school of thought that argued for the existence of free will was the Mu'tazila. They maintained that since justice (‘adl) is "the true essence" of divinity, "God can only do and only wishes what is salutary for human beings". (Based on verses Q.3:104, Q.22:10, Q.4:81.)[18] Consequently he not only orders people to do that which is good and forbids them to do that which is reprehensible, he abstains from doing evil Himself. This means that evil in the world cannot come from God, but instead from Man's/human beings' free will. Man (the human race), therefore, is "the genuine "creator" (khāliq) of his actions". Also rejecting predestination are Shia sects, such as the Twelvers and the Zaydis.)
- Literal belief in the attributes of God mentioned in scripture – such as seeing and hearing. Belief that these are figures of speech is heresy (bid'ah). (Note: The reasoning of the view that Allah did not have attributes is that an attribute free God preserves the notion of God's oneness (tawḥīd) and rejects any multiplicity within God. It was held by the Mu'tazila school of Islam and prominent Islamic philosophers like Ibn Sina (Avicenna) as well.)
- Divine law (shari'ah) and the need for its reintroduction. In the many "so-called" Muslim countries, governments now rule according to "imported capitalist or communist constitutions", and Islamic law is either "totally extinct" or relegated to a few areas of "minor importance". Accepting non-Islamic law is shirk and an act of kufr (disbelief), and violation of a type of tawheed called Tawhid al-Ibadah. This is because shirk is not just praying to/worshiping more than one God, it is obeying anyone other than God. It is fard (obligatory) for "those in a position to reintroduced Islamic law" to do so; it is obligatory for those not in a position to act to speak out against non-Islamic law (i.e. the rule of kufr), and call for the implementation of shari'ah."

=== Marriage, women, sex ===
Philips bemoans the fact that in western society very few women

consider obedience to their men a necessity for smooth married life. In fact, obedience to one's husband is not even considered a positive characteristic worthy of development in a woman. Even fewer modern women are willing to admit that differences exist between men and women; that God made allowances for man's role as leader, provider and protector. Western women deny these things in spite of the fact that the same differences are communicated in insidious ways in western society, itself. Women are sexually harassed when at work and are often forced to prostitute themselves in order to keep their positions or in order to get an advance; men outnumber women in positions of power ....

He preaches that the physical differences between men and women mean that rather than their being equal, as contemporary Western society teaches, under Islamic law the two genders have different but "complementary roles" in society, and that a natural hierarchy gives men the role of leading and women the role of obeying. In support of his position he quotes a sahih hadith where Muhammad says:

If mankind had been ordered to prostrate to anyone other than Allah, women would have been ordered to prostrate before their husbands.

Other roles of men include being "protectors and maintainers of women" (as long as the women are obedient), being "kind, gentle and helpful" to wives, and being prepared to "defend and enlarge the borders of Islam to the point of bearing arms".

Obedience to husbands (Philips believes) is both an important role and religious duty of wives. (Note: "However, as was mentioned earlier, women must regard obedience to their husbands as a religious duty whose execution will help the former in this life and the next ... ") Attending to the needs of her husband is the wife's primary responsibility in marriage. A woman is thus forbidden to leave her husband's home to visit friends or relatives without her husband's permission; (Note: "Additionally, a woman is not permitted to leave her husband's house in order to visit her relatives or friends without his permission, because obedience to one's husband is obligatory ...") there is no such thing as rape in marriage in Islam, because it is the husband's right to have sex with his wife when he pleases. (Note: "[In] Islam, a woman is obliged to give herself to her husband and he may not be charged with rape. Of course, if a woman is physically ill or exhausted, her husband should take her condition into consideration and not force himself upon her.") Philips points out another Sahih hadith where Muhammad states:

When a man calls his wife to satisfy his desire she must go to him even if she is occupied at the oven.

She must also obey his orders to bathe after intercourse, after menstruation or childbirth so as to achieve ritual purity; she must seek his permission before fasting (fasting may weaken her ability to have sex), keep his home "comfortable and pleasant", and not present herself to her husband with "unkempt hair or slovenly appearance". The hierarchy also explains the greater inheritance that men receive according to Islamic law.

On the subject of physical discipline of wives, Philips emphasizes that any beating of a wife "must be light" (lashing is forbidden) and quotes a hadith forbidding men from hitting their wife "in her face".

Philips explains that the (in his view) the "fragile emotional make-up" of a woman

is ideally suited for child rearing but generally unsuited for ultimate authority; ... she may wrongly disobey or contradict her husband. Under the influence of her monthly cycles, she may be contrary or highstrung and thus make bad decisions for and among mankind.

On the subject of women and statecraft, Philips admits that while it is true that there have been some female heads of state, "these cases represent the exception and not the norm which Allah addresses".

Despite his emphasis on the importance of women being subordination to men, Philips also condemns the socioeconomic practices "riddled through" Western society that "oppress women". He also mentions a few issues where Islamic law does not require a woman to obey her husband (according to Philips); he must not practice Coitus interruptus without her consent and if he fails to provide her and her children enough support, she is allowed to pilfer from his wealth without his "permission and knowledge".

==== Polygamy ====
Philips is a strong supporter of a husband's right to take up to four wives (polygyny) in Islam and has written a book in defense of this view (Polygamy in Marriage). Philips argues:

- that the surplus number of women in society (for example, in one country – the UK – females make up 3% more of the population than males), (Note: males make up 48.55% of the population, and females 51.45% in the UK as of the 1971 census; However, data from 2025 is mixed, with one country, India, having more than 45 million more males than females.) will lead to a weakening of the "western family structure" from the surplus population of women "unable to fulfill their sexual and psychological needs" unless marriages of more than one wife are allowed;
- that denying this right to multiple wives is tantamount to denying "the wisdom of divine decree" (which allows polygyny);
- in answer to the question: "If God is good and wishes good for His creatures, why did he legislate something (polygyny) which would be harmful to most women?", Philips replies that "Divine legislation" seeks to benefit "the majority of society", even if this may cause some "emotional harm to a minority" (women).
- that the "vehement" opposition to polygyny in Western society comes not from concern for women's rights, but from the "male dominated society" where men would rather be married to one woman and cheat on her, than have multiple wives to satisfy their desires and be faithful to them. (Note: "The fact is that institutional polygyny is vehemently opposed by male-dominated Western society because it would force men to fidelity. it would oblige them to take socio-economic responsibility for the fulfillment of their polygynous desires and provide protection for women and children from mental and physical abuse.")

==== Age to marry ====
Traditionally, Islam has favored early marriage, and in recent times Muhammad's marriage to Aysha at the age of nine has been a controversial subject, at least among non-Muslims. Philips writes that Islam "sets the age of marriage at puberty, as it is then natural dividing line between childhood and adulthood. Menstruation indicates that a young girl has reached childbearing age." He also differentiates between Western pedophiles who "are not seeking marriage" and only want to exploit and have sex with children, and Muslim men who marry girls shortly after they reach puberty.

==== Women's modesty ====
Women are advised by Philips to be modest in dress and to cover all of their body "except their faces and hands", and to not wear makeup or perfume, when among men they could possibly marry, (i.e. non-mahram men). "Undue mixing" of non-mahram men and women is "generally prohibited", as is staring at each other.

=== LGBT ===
According to the Counter Extremism Project, Philips has described gay sex as "evil," "dangerous," "deviant behavior," a cause of the dissolution of the nuclear family unit, and deserving of the death penalty. Philips has also complained that the fashion industry "is mostly controlled by homosexuals," and has "promoted the blurring of lines between males and females…" On his website, he (through author Akhlaq Ahmed) defends his position that gay sex is deviant, pointing out that the scientifically accepted position changed in the 1980s and 90s, and states, "the consequence of AIDS is enough to prove that homosexuality is evil and dangerous to society." Philips further argues that "Islam considers homosexuality to be the result of a choice," and cannot be excused as inherited or otherwise beyond the control of the gay person because it "is inconceivable that God made people homosexuals then declared it a crime".

=== Suicide bombing ===
Phillips had previously stated in a lecture and in one of his books that suicide bombers have been unfairly criticized for committing suicide (which is forbidden in Islam), when in fact they are showing bravery by sacrificing their lives in a military operation.

When you look at the mind of the suicide bomber, it's a different intention altogether ... The [enemy] is either too heavily armed, or they don't have the type of equipment that can deal with it, so the only other option they have is to try to get some people amongst them and then explode the charges that they have to try to destroy the equipment and to save the lives of their comrades. So this is not really considered to be suicide in the true sense. This is a military action and human lives are sacrificed in that military action. This is really the bottom line for it and that's how we should look at it.

Philips' ideas on suicide bombing made news after the website of Luton Islamic Centre, where a suicide bomber had worshipped, was found to carry a link to a lecture by Philips in which he made "comments used to justify suicide attacks, and material expounding antisemitism and homophobia". The chairman of the Luton Islamic Centre has said Philips had made some errors in his comments posted on its website and that it should not have been categorized as "suicide bombings" because he was referring to military operations as opposed to harming innocent people. After this controversy, Philips stated in an interview that he believes suicide bombings actually do not comply with Islamic law. Philips has also stated that he is opposed to Al-Qaeda and any type of terrorism in the name of Islam.

== Controversies ==
Philips came under criticism in Britain for his statements on suicide bombers. Some civil rights advocates have defended Philips for his actions, claiming that he is being religiously persecuted. Philips has responded to such criticism by stating he is a moderate who does not endorse terrorism or the use of suicide bombings in Islam.

According to the Counter Extremism Project, one of the men convicted of the World Trade Center bombings, (Clement Rodney Hampton-El, a.k.a. Abdullah Rashid), Philips gave Hampton-El the name of American military fighters who were about to leave the U.S. military and who might be willing to aiding jihadists in Bosnia. Philips had also agreed to provide Hampton-El with funding to recruit non-American Muslims for fighting in Bosnia. However, some of the recruits decided that rather than go to Bosnia, they would to attack targets in the United States, and this led to the unsuccessful plot to bomb the Holland and Lincoln tunnels.

=== Bannings ===
Philips has been banned from entering the United Kingdom, Australia, Denmark and Kenya, banned from re-entering Germany, ordered to leave Bangladesh, for "extremist views", and possible terror links, and arrested in and deported from the Philippines for "inciting and recruiting people to conduct terrorist activities."

In 2007 he was banned from entering Australia on the advice of national security agencies.

In 2010 Philips was banned from entering the UK by home secretary Theresa May for holding "extremist views".

In April 2011, Philips was banned from re-entering Germany as persona non grata.

In 2012, Philips was banned from entering Kenya over possible terror links.

Philips was named by the US government as an unindicted co-conspirator in the 1993 World Trade Center bombing. He has stated that this allegation was not factual hence he was not arrested.

In 2014, the publisher of a book authored by Philips entitled "The Fundamentals of Tawheed" was arrested by armed officers during a raid of Islamic institutions in Prague. 20 people were detained during Friday Prayer at a mosque and a community center. Law enforcement officials claimed Philips' book "incites xenophobia and violence" and insisted it was racist. Philips "vehemently" defended his book, denied it condoned racism, noting that millions of copies had been published in Muslim communities around the world, and stated that any action against the book could "constitute an attack on Islam itself."

In June 2014, the Bangladeshi intelligence service ordered Phillips, who had come to Dhaka to give lectures, to leave the country.

In September 2014, Philips was arrested in the Philippines for "inciting and recruiting people to conduct terrorist activities." He had been expected to be deported by Philippine immigration authorities after police arrested him in southern Davao City. The director of the Philippine National Police in Southern Mindanao, said Philips was questioned for his possible links with terror groups including the ISIS (Islamic State in Iraq and Syria). He was deported from the Philippines back to Canada. Philips denied the charges leveled by Filipino officials and denied links to terrorists groups. Some religious leaders and civil rights advocates have defended Philips and criticized his deportation from the Philippines, arguing that he has not done anything wrong and that he has been a victim of religious persecution.

In the April 2016 issue of Dabiq Magazine, The Islamic State of Iraq and the Levant, declared Philips to be a murtadd (or apostate) and threatened to kill him for denouncing ISIS.

One of Philip's works entitled "The Fundamentals of Tauheed" has been described as "extremist" by the United Kingdom prison service. As a consequence, this book has now been removed and banned from prisons.

In May 2017, Philips was banned from entering Denmark for two years along with other preachers including Salman al-Ouda and Terry Jones.

=== Intra-Salafi disagreement ===
Within the Salafi community, one Abu Khadeejah has alleged that Bilal Philips has been a "deceitful defender of Ahl ul Bida" (i.e. of innovation in Islam), and a proponent of "Ikhwaanee Manhaj" (i.e. the religious method or interpretation of the Muslim Brotherhood). Philips has replied lamenting intra-Salafi infighting and accusing his critics of being excessively quarrelsome and deficient in their knowledge of Islam.

Another work (non-Salafi) critiquing Philips is a compilation of critical essays, A Critical Analysis of The Contradictions of Dr. Bilal Philips from www.darulikhlaas.co.nr.

== Influence ==
According to the publication The 500 Most Influential Muslims, Bilal Philips founded both the first accredited Islamic university in India in 2009: (Preston International College, Chennai), and the Islamic Online University (AKA International Open University or iou.edu.gm), which (as of 2025) has over 300,000 registered students studying accredited English-medium degree courses in Islamic Studies, IT, Business Administration, etc.

Philips has been described as one of "the key foundational figures" among African American Muslims who received scholarships to Saudi universities in the hopes that they would "aggressively" spread Salafi Islam when they returned to their home countries. A strong African American Salafi movement did emerged in the 1990s, in many ways a by-product of the efforts of Philips and other Saudi-educated African American Salafi along with the regular networks and relationships they established and maintained with the major Salafi scholars in Saudi Arabia such as Ibn Baz (d. 1999) and al-Uthaymin (d. 2001). Philips help create an indelible connection between Saudi Arabian Salafism and African American Salafis according to Jefrey Diamant:

African American Salafi movement existence was inextricably linked to Saudi proselytization efforts. Crucially, the Salafi mosques would nurture relationships with elderly shaykhs in Saudi Arabia whose words from Medina would directly affect communal disputes that arose among African American Salafis. Fatwas and other statements made by these shaykhs were issued six thousand miles away.

Philips has produced a "formidable" output of books, booklets, and audiovisual materials, several of which have been translated into a number of European languages, such as German, French, and Spanish. His works are written in accessible language, assuming little or no prior knowledge of Islam, have considerable relevance to the contemporary Muslims in the West, especially the younger demographic often not connected to traditional Islamic religion and culture, and have attracted a wide appeal not just among Salafi but Muslims in general. As of 2019 he had 670,000 followers on Twitter, over 6 million followers on Facebook, where he makes several posts a day, 40,000 subscribers on his YouTube channel and a considerable presence on Peace TV, Huda TV, and Islam Channel.

== Bibliography ==
- 1985: The Mirage in Iran, Abul Qasim Publications
- 1987: The Quran's Numerical Miracle: Hoax and Heresy, Abul Qasim Publications
- 1988: The Ansar Cult in America, Tawheed Publications
- 1989: Ibn Taymeeyah's Essay on The Jinn (Demons), International Islamic Publishing House (IIPH)
- 1990: Islamic Studies Book 1, Al Hidaayah Publishing / IIPH
- 1990: Polygamy in Islaam, IIPH
- 1990: Salvation Through Repentance, IIPH
- 1990: Tafseer Soorah al-Hujuraat, IIPH
- 1990: The Evolution of Fiqh (Islamic Law & The Madh-habs), Tawheed Publications / IIPH
- 1990: The Fundamentals of Tawheed (Islamic Monotheism), IIPH / Al Hidaayah Publishing
- 1994: The True Religion of God, Dar Al Fatah
- 1995: Arabic Reading and Writing Made Easy, Dar Al Fatah
- 1995: Hajj and 'Umrah, IIPH
- 1996: Dream Interpretation, Dar Al Fatah
- 1996: Funeral Rites In Islam, Dar Al Fathah
- 1996: Ibn al-Jawzee's, The Devil's Deception, Al Hidaayah Publishing
- 1996: Islamic Rules on Menstruation & Post-Natal Bleeding, Dar Al Fatah / IIPH
- 1996: Islamic Studies Book 2, Al Hidaayah Publishing / IIPH
- 1996: The Best In Islam, Dar Al Fatah
- 1996: The True Message of Jesus Christ, Dar Al Fatah / IIPH
- 1997: Islamic Studies Book 3, Al Hidaayah Publishing / IIPH
- 1997: Arabic Grammar Made Easy Book 1, Dar Al Fatah
- 1997: The Exorcist Tradition in Islam, Dar Al Fatah / Al Hidaayah Publishing
- 1997: The Purpose of Creation, Dar Al Fatah / IIPH
- 1997: Usool at-Tafseer, Dar Al Fatah / IIPH
- 2001: Did God Become Man?
- 2001: Islamic Studies Book 4, Al Hidaayah Publishing / IIPH
- 2002: A Commentary on Ibn Qudaamah's Radiance of Faith
- 2003: A Commentary on The Book of Monotheism
- 2003: The Clash of Civilizations: An Islamic View, Al Hidaayah Publishing
- 2003: The Foundations of Islamic Studies
- 2003: The Moral Foundations of Islamic Culture
- 2003: Usool al-Hadeeth: The Methodology of Hadeeth Evaluation, IIPH
- 2003: Usool al-Fiqh: The Methodology of Islamic Law Made Easy
- 2008: A Commentary on Surah Al-Mulk, Al Hidaayah Publishing
- 2008: A Commentary on Surah Al-Buruj, Al Hidaayah Publishing
- 2011: A Commentary on Ibn Taymiyyah's Essay on the Heart, Dakwah Corner Bookstore
- 2022: Tafsir Surah Ya-Seen, Dakwah Corner Bookstore

== See also ==
- List of Da'ees
- List of Islamic studies scholars
- Dawah
- Islam in Canada
- Zakir Naik
- Muhammad bin Jamil Zeno
- Yusuf Estes

== Sources ==
- Duderija, Adis; Rasool, Ghulam (2019). "Bilal Philips as a Proponent of Neo-Traditional Salafism and His Significance for Understanding Salafism in the West". Religions. 10 (6): 371. doi:10.3390/rel10060371. hdl:10072/387003.
- Gleave, Robert (2007). Scripturalist Islam: The History and Doctrines of the Akhbārī Shīʿī School. Brill. ISBN 978-90-474-2162-7.
- Philips, Abu Ameenah Bilal; Jones, Jamila (2005) [1994]. Polygamy in Islam (PDF). Riyadh, Saudi Arabia: International Islamic Publishing House.
- Philips, Abu Ameenah Bilal (2005b). The Fundamentals of Tawheed (PDF). Riyadh, Saudi Arabia: International Islamic Publishing House.
- Suleiman, Farid (2024). Ibn Taymiyya and the Attributes of God. Brill. ISBN 978-90-04-49990-4.
