= Dar al Ber Society =

Charitable organization based in Dubai

- Formation: 1978
- Type: Charitable organization (Registered Society)
- Legal status: Tax exempted
- Location: Dubai
- Coordinates: 25.1696°N 55.2411°E
- Region served: United Arab Emirates
- Chairman: Eng Khalfan Khalifa Al Mazroui
- Executive Director: Abdullah Ali Bin Zayed
- Head of Charitable Projects: Omran Mohammad
- Website: Official website

Dar al Ber Society (DABS) is a charitable organization funded by the Government of Dubai, United Arab Emirates.

== History ==
Dar al Ber Society was established in 1978 as per the Ministry of Labor and Social Affairs, Government of Dubai decree No. 23/78. The Society has a declared mission to provide the needy with humanitarian assistance, reflecting the spirit of brotherhood an achieve solidarity based on human values, the national spirit and Islamic principles. It is headquartered along Shaikh Zayed Road, Al Manara, Dubai and have branch offices in Bur Dubai, Nad AL Hamar and Jumeirah in Dubai and two other branches operating in Ras Al Khaimah and Ajman.

Eng Khalfan Khalifa Al Mazrui is the organization's chairman.

The organization has donated to education, medicine, and to the people of Gaza Strip. The President of the Republic of Guinea-Bissau, Manuel Serifo Nhamadjo, paid a visit to Dar al Ber Society headquarters in 2014 for discussion about setting up of infrastructural projects in his country, in coordination with the society. Another dignitary to pay a visit to DABS office was Dr. Mohammed Shahym Ali Said, the Minister Islamic Affairs, of the Republic of Maldives.

DAB Society has an organized mechanism for raising resources for its activities. The primary source of funds is through collection of Zakat, a prescriptive donation practised as per Islamic traditions. The society has opened multiple centres and avenues for collection of funds. They also collect project based philanthropic donations from individuals and corporates, and is also supported by the Government of Dubai.

== See also ==
- Sadaqah
