= Hamza Tzortzis =

British Muslim apologist (born 1980)

Hamza Andreas Tzortzis
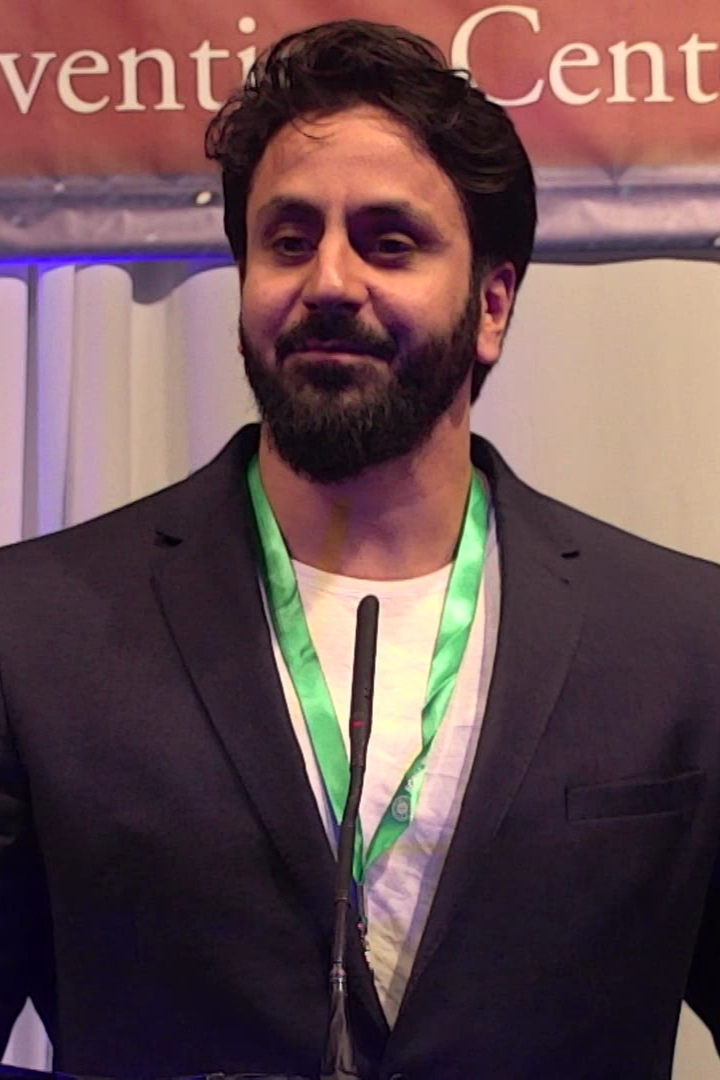
- Hamza Andreas Tzortzis in 2017
- Born: Andreas Tzortzis; 1980 (age 45–46)
- Education: Master of Arts (MA) and Postgraduate Certificate (PgCert) in Philosophy, University of London.
- Occupations: Islamic researcher, speaker, author

Hamza Andreas Tzortzis (born 1980) is a British Muslim convert, public speaker on Islam, researcher, and author of The Divine Reality: God, Islam and the Mirage of Atheism.

== Early life ==
Tzortzis was born in 1980 to Greek parents, with his family hailing from the village of Raveni in northern Greece. He converted to Islam in 2002.

== Career ==
Tzortzis has been a guest speaker in the United Kingdom and Australia. Tzortzis was a senior researcher for a 2010 iERA survey of non-Muslims' views of Islam in the United Kingdom. In 2015 he was a finalist for Religious Advocate of the Year at the British Muslim Awards. Tzortzis has contributed to discussions on the BBC news programmes: The Big Questions and Newsnight. Tzortzis stepped down from his role at iERA and joined the Sapience Institute as of 2020.

Andrew Gilligan described Tzortzis in a 2010 The Telegraph article as "a former researcher for the hardline Hittin Institute and chaired the launch event of iERA, an umbrella organisation hosting many well-known British Muslim extremists who preach opposition to democracy and hatred against homosexuals and Jews." Tzortzis calls this misrepresentations and lies. After Keele University cancelled a speech by Tzortzis, the Stoke Sentinel called him a "radical Islamic speaker ... a former member of the radical group Hizb ut-Tahrir which believes in the idea of an Islamic state ... who supports Sharia law ... [and has] also been linked to controversial comments on homosexuality and a series of other issues." Tzortzis said in a 2016 interview that, while he still sees homosexuality as "sinful" in the eyes of God, he condemns any violence towards the homosexual community.

He has stated that he does not believe in apostasy laws, which he calls "outdated". Tzortzis also criticises child marriage, opposes extremism and denounces the Islamic State (IS). In 2016 India's National Investigation Agency (NIA), in a chargesheet against the Islamic State, named Tzortzis as having directly or indirectly influenced suspects accused of having links with IS. He further stated that IS are "spiritually diseased, sick people".

== Publications ==
=== Books ===
- The Divine Reality: God, Islam and the Mirage of Atheism. FB Publishing, 2016.

=== Translations ===
==== Bengali ====
- The Divine Reality: Allah, Islam o Nastikkobader Morichika. Tr. Masud Shorif, Sean Publications, 2020.
- Liberalism o Muslim Somaj (Liberalism and Muslim Society). Tr. Hossain Shakil, Minarah Publications, Unpublished.

==== Arabic ====
- al-Haqiqah al-Ilahiyyah: Allah wal-Islam wa Sarab al-Ilhad (The Divine Reality). Tr. Naif al-Mal, Markaz Dalil, 2016.
