= Hussain Yee =

Preacher from Malaysia

Yang Berbahagia Dato' Sheikh Haji Hussain Yee DMPN
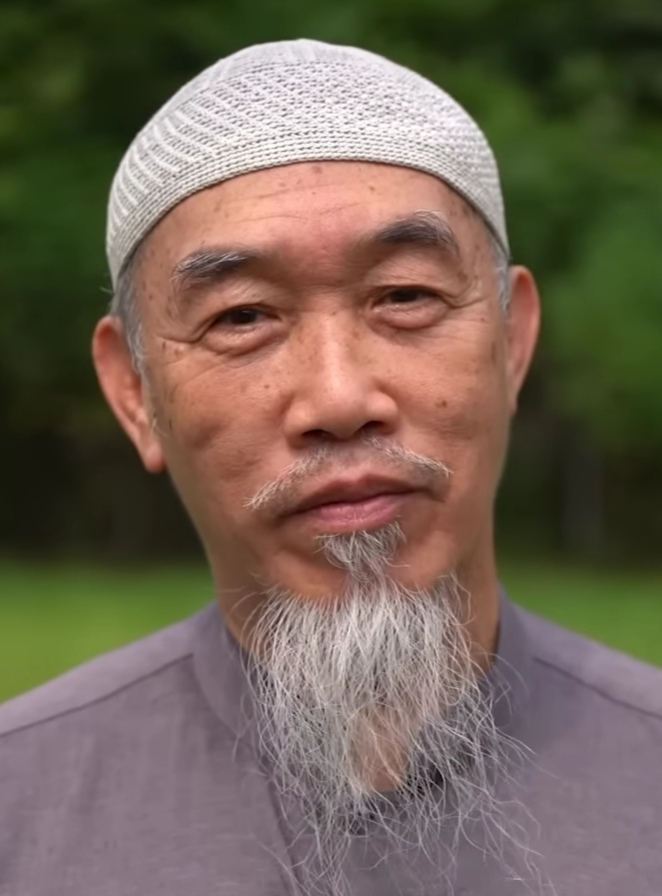
- Yee in 2020

Personal life
- Born: 1954 (age 71–72) Federation of Malaya (now Malaysia)
- Education: Islamic University of Madinah
- Occupation: Preacher
- Website: alkhaadem.com (founder/president)

Religious life
- Religion: Islam
- Denomination: Sunni
- Jurisprudence: Hanbali
- Creed: Athari
- Movement: Salafism

Muslim leader
- Influenced by: Nasiruddin Albani

YouTube information
- Channel: Hussain Yee
- Years active: 2013 (Presently active on other channels)
- Subscribers: 12 thousand
- Views: 536,965
- Last updated: 23 July 2025

Mohd Hussain Yee bin Abdullah (born 1954), also known as Hussain Yee, is a Malaysian Chinese Muslim scholar. He is also a world-wide recognized speaker and community leader in local and international platform. He is the Founder and President of Al Khaadem, and concurrently serves as an advisor to the Japan Halal Foundation.

Additionally, he serves as a Halal advisory committee member for the islamic Da'wah Council of the Philippines, a member of the World Halal Council. With over forty years of experience in strategic management, advisory, and consulting to Islamic agencies worldwide, Sheikh Hussain Yee promotes peace, family and social harmony in his seminars and talks all around the world. He dedicates significant time to family and marriage counselling as well as youth development.

== Background ==
=== Early years ===
Born into a Buddhist Malaysian Chinese family, Hussain Yee converted to Islam at the age of 18. Yee studied under the scholar Muhammad Nasiruddin al-Albani.

=== Positions held ===
Hussain Yee is the Founder and President of Al-Khaadem.

Among other positions, he spent a year in 1980 as an Advisor for the Cambodian Islamic Refugee Organisation in Paris, France. He has also served as a Counsellor at PERKIM Kuala Lumpur and as the Director of Da’wah for the Islamic Center in Hong Kong from 1984 to 1985.

== Controversy and response ==
Yee has received criticism for his belief that there is no proof that Muslim terrorists were responsible for the September 11 attacks on the United States and for implying that Jews could instead be responsible.

In a talk on Peace TV he stated, "What happened in 9/11, nobody really knows", the American government can only "suspect that the Muslims are involved" and "we cannot act on a suspicious statement." He then said that "A group of Jews was so happy in America, they were having a party when they heard that the Twin Towers had been burned."

Hussain Yee later responded to the accusations and denied ever saying that "Jews were behind 9/11 attack", and accused The Australian newspaper of "inept journalism". He also stated that his mission is to "promote peace and wellbeing [sic] for all people, regardless of race and religion".

During a 2006 lecture broadcast on Peace TV, Yee also stated that the Jews have strayed from Allah's commandments, and like doing things that are "very extreme," and that the most extremist nation are the Jews. He went on to explain that since Jews break their promises to Allah, they cannot be expected to respect the United Nations or to be dependable: "If they want to kill, they kill because they believe that they are the chosen people...and blood that is not Jewish is like an animal." He said this is the reason that they kill Palestinians every day.

In the same lecture, Yee said that Christians "always play around with the world."

== See also ==
- List of converts to Islam
- Islamic schools and branches

== Link ==
- Al-Khadeem Malaysia
