= Zakir Naik =

Indian Islamic scholar (born 1965)

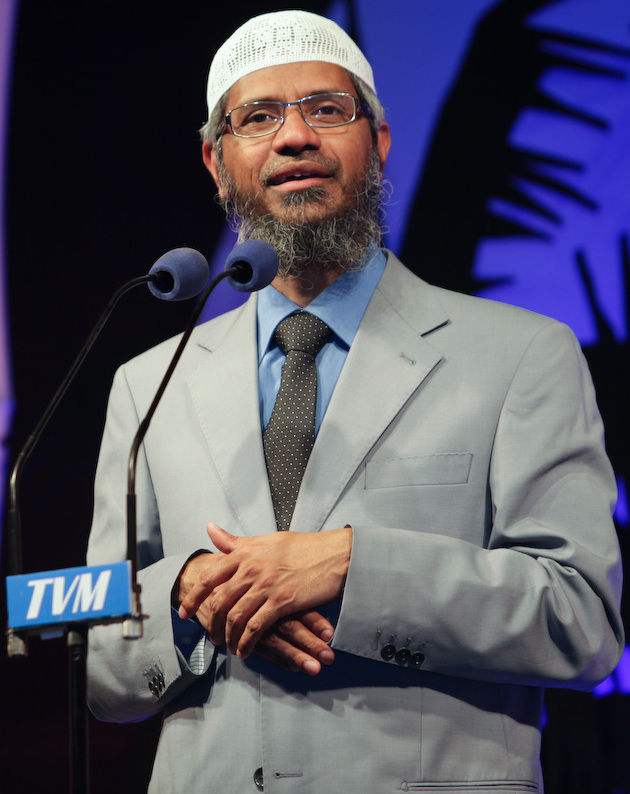
- Naik in the Maldives, 2010
- Born: Zakir Abdul Karim Naik; 18 October 1965 (age 61); Bombay, Maharashtra, India
- Education: University of Mumbai (MBBS)
- Occupations: Orator; physician
- Years active: 1991–present
- Known for: Dawah
- Title: Founder and president of Islamic Research Foundation; Founder of Peace TV, Peace TV Bangla, Peace TV Urdu, and Peace TV Chinese
- Board member of: Islamic Research Foundation, Islamic International School and United Islamic Aid
- Spouse: Farhat Naik
- Children: 3
- Awards: Sharjah Award for Voluntary Work (2013); Dubai International Holy Quran Award (2013); King Faisal Prize (2015)

YouTube information
- Channel: Dr Zakir Naik
- Years active: 2011–present
- Genre: Islamic
- Subscribers: 4.42 million
- Views: 315 million
- Last updated: 156 days ago
- Website: zakirnaik.com

Zakir Abdul Karim Naik (born 18 October 1965) is an Indian Islamic da'i and orator who focuses on comparative religion. He is the founder and president of the Islamic Research Foundation (IRF) and Peace TV. He is a well-known figure in the Islamic world. Unlike many Islamic preachers, he quotes from various religious scriptures in his speeches which he delivers in English rather than Arabic or Urdu, wearing a suit and tie instead of the traditional robe. Naik does not claim to be a follower of any one school of thought in Islam, but he is considered to be most closely associated with the Salafi school of thought.

In 2016, while Naik was abroad, the BJP government led by Narendra Modi accused Naik of "propagating hate speech" and money laundering, banned the Islamic Research Foundation, and banned broadcasting "Peace TV". Naik denying all charges did not return to India and became a permanent resident of Malaysia. Naik is currently a wanted fugitive in India. The National Investigation Agency attempted to issue an Interpol red notice for his arrest and was refused thrice due to insufficient evidence. Naik's Peace TV is banned in India, Bangladesh, Canada, Sri Lanka, and the United Kingdom under hate speech laws.

== Early life and education ==
Zakir Naik was born on 18 October 1965 to Abdul Karim Naik and Roshan Naik in Bombay, India. He attended Kishinchand Chellaram College and studied medicine at the Topiwala National Medical College & BYL Nair Charitable Hospital and later the University of Mumbai, where he obtained a Bachelor of Medicine and Surgery (MBBS).

== Career ==
In 1991, he started working in the field of dawah and founded the Islamic International School in Mumbai and the United Islamic Aid, which provides scholarships to poor and destitute Muslim youth. Naik's wife, Farhat Naik, is the president of the women's section of the Islamic Research Foundation (IRF). He established United Islamic Aid, which provides scholarship to poor and destitute Muslim youth.

Naik said in 2006 that he was inspired by Ahmed Deedat, an Islamic preacher whom he met in 1987. (Naik is sometimes referred to as "Deedat plus", a label given to him by Deedat.)

On 21 January 2006, the Islamic Research Foundation, which Naik heads, founded Peace TV. It is a non-profit Emirati satellite television network that broadcasts free-to-air programming. It is one of the world's largest religious satellite television networks.

In the second half of March 2021, Naik launched Al Hidaayah, which provides educational content about Islam. The platform has thousands of hours of videos of more than 40 renowned Islamic speakers from all over the world including Ahmed Deedat, Yusuf Estes, Hussein Ye, and Bilal Philips. He claimed that this platform is a "halal" version of Netflix.

== Lectures and debates ==
Unlike many Islamic preachers, his lectures are colloquial, given in English, not Urdu or Arabic, and he usually wears a suit and tie. Naik has held many debates and lectures and is said to "have delivered over 4000 lectures around the world" as of 2016. Anthropologist Thomas Blom Hansen has written that Naik's style of memorising the Quran and Hadith literature in various languages, and his related missionary activity, has made him extremely popular in Muslim circles. Many of his debates are recorded and widely distributed in video and DVD media and online. His talks have been recorded in English and broadcast on weekends on several cable networks in Mumbai's Muslim neighbourhoods, and on the Peace TV channel, which he co-produces. Topics he speaks on include: "Islam and Modern Science", "Islam and Christianity", and "Islam and secularism".

His first debate was in 1994, a debate on the views of writer Taslima Nasreen on Islam in her book Lajja, organised at the "Mumbai Marathi Patrakar Sangh", entitled "Is Religious Fundamentalism a Stumbling block to Freedom of Expression?". With the presence of four journalists, the debate went on for hours. In April 2000, Naik debated with William Campbell in Chicago on the topic of "The Qur'an and the Bible: In the Light of Science", one of his most-cited debates. On 21 January 2006 Naik held an inter-religious dialogue with Ravi Shankar in Bangalore about the concept of God in Islam and Hinduism. In February 2011 Naik addressed the Oxford Union via video link from India.

=== University of Melbourne ===
In 2004 Naik, at the invitation of the Islamic Information and Services Network of Australasia, made an appearance at the University of Melbourne, where he argued that only Islam gave women true equality. He said the more "revealing Western dress" makes women more susceptible to rape. Sushi Das of The Age commented that "Naik extolled the moral and spiritual superiority of Islam and lampooned other faiths and the West in general", further stating that Naik's words "fostered a spirit of separateness and reinforced prejudice".

=== St David's Hall ===
In August 2006, Naik's visit and conference in Cardiff caused controversy when Welsh conservative MP David Davies called for his appearance to be cancelled. He said Naik was a "hate-monger", and that his views did not deserve a public platform. Muslims from Cardiff, however, defended Naik's right to speak in the city. Saleem Kidwai, Secretary-General of the Muslim Council of Wales, stated that "people who know about him [Naik] know that he is one of the most uncontroversial persons you could find. He talks about the similarities between religions, and how should we work on the common ground between them", whilst also inviting Davies to discuss further with Naik personally in the conference. The conference went ahead after the Cardiff council stated it was satisfied that he would not be preaching extremist views.

=== Invitation to Gambia ===
In 2014, Naik visited Gambia at the invitation of President Yahya Jammeh to attend the grand celebration of Gambian revolution's 20th anniversary. There he delivered four lectures between 11 and 22 October. The lectures took place in University of the Gambia, Pancha Mi Hall of Paradise Suites Hotel, presidents home village Kanilai, Foni Kansala and Kairaba Beach Hotel, Kololi. Gambian cabinet ministers, religious leaders, students and thousands of people attended his lectures on subjects including "Terrorism and Jihad: an Islamic perspective", "religion in the right perspective", "Dawah or destruction?" and "the misconceptions about Islam". Meanwhile, he also met with the president Yahya Jammeh along with Gambia Supreme Islamic Council and held an Islamic conference with the Imams of Gambia.

=== Malaysia ===
Naik delivered four lectures in Malaysia during 2012. The lectures took place in Johor Bahru, Universiti Teknologi MARA in Shah Alam, Kuantan and Putra World Trade Centre in Kuala Lumpur. The former Prime Minister of Malaysia, Mahathir Mohamad, prominent figures and several thousand people attended the lectures at different places despite protest by the members of HINDRAF. The organisers of Naik's speeches said their purpose was to promote harmony among people of various religions.

Naik delivered another six lectures in April 2016. Two of his lectures in Malaysia, entitled "Similarities between Hinduism and Islam" and "Is the Quran God's word?" were objected by HINDRAF, along with other NGOs, saying that these lectures might provoke inter-racial tensions. With the initial support of the Government authority, the event went ahead as planned.

Naik delivered a speech on Islamophobia on 9 August 2019 at the Sultan Mohammad IV Stadium, Kota Bharu, Kelantan which was attended by more than 100,000 people.

== Views ==
Zakir Naik does not claim to be an adherent of a particular school of thought in Islam. Despite his denials, some people believe his views and ideology are similar to Salafis.

Naik says that his goal is to "concentrate on the educated Muslim youth who have become apologetic about their own religion and have started to feel the religion is outdated". He considers it a duty of every Muslim to remove perceived misconceptions about Islam and to counter what he views as the Western media's anti-Islamic bias in the aftermath of the 11 September 2001 attacks in the United States. Naik has said that "despite the strident anti-Islam campaign, 34,000 Americans have embraced Islam from September 2001 to July 2002". According to Naik, Islam is a religion of reason and logic, and the Quran contains 1000 verses relating to science, which he says explains the number of Western converts. Some of his articles are published in magazines such as Islamic Voice.

=== Supremacy of Islam ===
Naik said that Islam is the "best" religion because "The Quran says it. No other religious text or scripture claims this fact." He added that, "Islam is also labelled as intolerant, and it is indeed, but towards corruption, discrimination, injustice, adultery, alcoholism, and all evils. Islam is the most 'tolerant' religion as far as promoting the human values is concerned."

=== Social issues ===
Naik equated music with alcohol and stated that both are intoxicating in nature. He has opposed dancing and singing, claiming that they are forbidden in Islam.

Naik said that guilty people must be punished and accepts chopping off hands for stealing. He has also recommended that the United States implements this logic in order to reduce its high crime rate.

Naik says the LGBT community are experiencing a mental illness caused by the use of pornography propagated by television. Naik says that in accordance with the Quran and sunnah, he recommends the death penalty for homosexuals that committed the act publicly.

=== Biological evolution ===
Denying evolution, Naik said that the theory of evolution is "only a hypothesis, and an unproven conjecture at best". According to Naik, most scientists "support the theory, because it went against the Bible – not because it was true." Naik also denies that different hominids have missing links, and claims that the majority of scientists do not accept evolution as a whole. Naik argues that scientific theories were prophesied by the Quran. For example, he has stated in 2010 that certain verses of the Quran accurately describe embryological development.

Naik argued, "What Darwin said was only a 'theory'. There is no book saying 'the Fact of Evolution' – All the books say Theory of Evolution." He further added, "There is not a single statement in the Qur'an, which Science has proved wrong yet. Hypothesis goes against the Qur'an – theories go against the Qur'an. There is not a single scientific fact, which is mentioned in the Holy Qur'an which goes against established science – It may go against theory."

=== Criticism of media ===
Naik has called the media "the most important tool rather the most dangerous weapon in the world, which converts black into white and a villain into a hero". He suggested that "We should use the same media to remove the misconceptions, misquotations, misinterpretations, and misrepresentations about Islam." He claimed, Western powers and media play a double-standard strategy, who describe Muslims as extremists and fundamentalists to defame Islam. He said, "The maximum damage done to the image of Islam today is by the international media which is bombarding misconceptions about it day and night using an array of strategies. International media, be it print, audio, video, or online, use a number of strategies to malign Islam by first picking up the black sheep of the Muslim community, and portraying them as though they are exemplary Muslims." Naik also claimed the "third and fourth" strategy by international media is "to pick a word from Quran or sunnah and mistranslate it" and "to malign Islam by saying something that does not belong to it". Naik also criticizes the portrayal of Muslims in films.

Naik also said:

If a Muslim woman wears hijab or veil it is labeled as women subjugation, but if a nun does to the same it turns into a sign of respect and modesty. A 50-year-old Muslim marrying a 16-year-old girl (willingly) is a headline, but a 50-year-old non-Muslim raping a six-year-old girl appears as brief news or filler. They say Islam does not give rights to women, and is an illogical religion. They portray Islam as the problem of humanity though it is the solution to all man's problems. The same applies to the misinterpreted words 'fundamentalist' and 'extremist' which are basically western words. A true Muslim must be an extremist in the correct direction, by being extremely kind, loving, tolerant, honest, and just. While Indians were fighting for their freedom, the British government was labelling them as terrorists; same activity, same people, but two different labels. The same happened with Muslims who are labelled as terrorists in media, so we should look into backgrounds and reasons for an activity before labelling people."

=== Other religions ===
In 2006, Naik said that the Kalki Avatar of Hinduism refers to the Islamic Prophet Muhammad.

==== Apostasy ====
Naik believes that Muslims who convert from Islam should not necessarily receive death sentences, but that under Islamic law those who leave Islam and then "propagate the non-Islamic faith and speak against Islam" should be put to death. Another source states that according to Naik, "There is no death penalty for apostates in Islam... until the apostate starts to preach his new religion: then he can be put to death."

==== Propagation of other faiths in Islamic states ====
While he appreciates that people of other religions allow Muslims to freely propagate Islam in their country, Naik preaches that the dissemination of other religions within an Islamic state must be forbidden because he believes that other faiths are incorrect, so their propagation is as wrong as it would be for an arithmetic teacher to teach that 2+2=3 or 6 instead of 2+2=4.

Naik criticises the activities of Christian missionaries in the Muslim world saying, "the missionaries write verses of the Bible in Arabic calligraphy, such as 'God is love' to catch fish with the Muslims. We in Peace TV, for example, do not use such deceit."

=== Violence ===
In a lecture given in University of the Gambia, Zakir strongly condemned the atrocities around the world in the name of Jihad, where innocent people died, saying

Jihad is misunderstood by both Muslims and non-Muslims, Jihad means to strive and struggle to make society better, the best form of Jihad is to strive and struggle against non-Muslims, using the teachings of the Quran; the Prophet Peace Be Upon Him and the Almighty Allah, Islam means peace."

According to Naik, the killing of any innocent person, either Muslim or not is prohibited by Islam, while condemning the double-standard, played by the western powers and media who describes Muslims as extremists and fundamentalists. He said in an unequivocal term that, even in Islamic Jihad, there are laid down rules and regulations as to when and how to kill a person, which he noted, totally contradicts what is currently happening around the world, by some groups who claim to fight for Jihad.

In another lecture given in Al-Khawaneej, Dubai, Naik stated that the most mistranslated and misunderstood word about Islam by non-Muslims and even some Muslims is "Jihad", which, he said, has nothing to do with the phrase "holy war" that is never actually used in the Quran or sunnah and was first used by the crusaders who killed millions in the name of Christianity. He added the word "Jihad" actually means to strive or struggle against one's own evil inclinations, to make the society better, in self-defense on a battlefield, and against oppression.

Naik promotes the conspiracy theory that US President George Bush planned the September 11 attacks, describing it as "an inside job". He refers to the popularity of 9/11 conspiracy theories within the United States itself as proof of a foregone conclusion. His position on 9/11 was denounced by the Department of State as "reprehensible", and he has been denied entry into the United Kingdom and Canada. In 2016, when was asked whether Osama bin Laden was a terrorist, he stated that he did not have an opinion since had not done any research on him.

=== Views on terrorism ===
Later in 2010, Naik said that he had been quoted out of context regarding the remarks on terrorism. "As far as terrorist is concerned", he said, "I tell the Muslims that every Muslim should be a terrorist... What is the meaning of the word terrorist? Terrorist by definition means a person who terrorises. So in this context every Muslim should be a terrorist to each and every anti-social element. I'm aware that terrorist is more commonly used for a person who terrorises innocent human beings. So in this context no Muslim should ever terrorise a single innocent human being."

Naik has been at the center of multiple controversies regarding the topic of terrorism, most notably for being seen as an inspiration for terrorists. In 1996, Naik gave a speech specifically about terrorism and addressing Osama bin Laden. Naik stated that "Every Muslim should be a terrorist. The thing is that if he [Osama] is terrorizing the terrorist, then he is following Islam." Perhaps the most controversial part about his speech was that he called America "the biggest terrorist". In a separate speech, he states that "the western countries say war for peace, war for peace. It is not war for peace, it is war on peace". Naik's comments received significant media attention and the British government banned him on the basis of these comments. Naik's lawyer and IRF argued that the speech was made before 9/11, that media misquoted Naik and made misleading assertions about the timing of Naik's speech, and that the decision to ban Naik from the UK was "politically motivated".

Naik stated that Hitler, "who was not a Muslim, is the biggest terrorist in the world as he incinerated four to six million Jews."

When asked about his views on killings, Naik said "the Quran says so – if anyone kills an innocent human being, Muslim or non-Muslim, it is as though he has killed the whole humanity, So how can any Muslim kill innocent human beings?" It was only permissible, he said, to kill a person who "has killed someone else... or created corruption in the land." He also criticized the media for "picking up verses of the Quran or hadiths and quoting them out of context to mislabel Islam as a religion that promotes violence and killing". He said that "critics of Islam quotes Verse 5/9 which reads: 'Wherever you find a non-Muslim, kill him' out of context to malign Islam though it was an order in a battlefield, and Islam always promotes peace as a better option during war."

In a press conference via Skype, when Naik was asked for his opinion on suicide bombings he replied affirmatively, saying it was permitted in Islam and said "it is haram if innocent people are being killed. But, if suicide bombing is used as a tactic of war, then it may be permitted. For example, in World War II, Japan used suicide bombing as a tactic of war."

==== Najibullah Zazi ====
Najibullah Zazi, the Afghan-American linked to Al-Qaeda who was found guilty in the 2009 New York City Subway and United Kingdom plot was an "admirer" of Naik's sermons. When Time hinted that his preachings could have inspired Zazi's terrorist activities, Naik insisted: "I have always condemned terrorism, because according to the glorious Koran, if you kill one innocent person, then you have killed the whole of humanity."

==== ISIS ====
Naik called Islamic State of Iraq and Syria the "anti-Islamic State of Iraq and Syria" and said that the enemies of Islam were promoting ISIS. He also added, "We should not say ISIS, we should say AISIS. Because they are anti-Islamic. I request all the Muslims of the world, as well as the Muslim media: Please don't help the enemies of Islam in attacking Islam." He further added, "If you verify you will know that I am totally against terrorism. I am totally against killing any innocent human being." In another lecture in Dubai, he stated, It is, therefore not correct to say ISIS or Islamic State has killed Syrian or Iraqi innocents. He said, "We should say anti-Islamic state kills them as Quran affirms that whoever kills an innocent person is as if he kills all humanity, and he who saves a single person – disregard his religion, is like saving all humanity."

==== Orlando shooting ====
Zakir criticized the media for "linking Islam" with the Orlando nightclub shooting. He accused the media of a "double-standard strategy" saying, "the same [double-standard strategy] is happening with a man related by nothing to Islam but by his name who killed over 50 gays in Orlando."

=== Politics ===
Naik criticized the partition of India and creation of Pakistan, calling it a tragedy. Naik holds that those who advocated the creation of Pakistan out of the northwestern provinces of colonial India were "not even practising Muslims".

In 2016, Naik praised Prime Minister Narendra Modi for his frequent visits to Muslim majority countries, commenting "if his intention is to maintain unity between Hindus and Muslims and between India and other Muslim countries, I am totally for him". He described Modi's visits as favourable for India, believing it could attract foreign investment. In 2019, in an interview in Week magazine, Naik strongly criticized Modi and the BJP for what he called false charges and propaganda against him for political purposes, and said that he is targeted for his popularity. He stated that he would not return to India while Modi remained in power, drawing parallels with the example of Muhammad in Hijrah. He also described Modi and the BJP as dangerous for Indian Muslims' security, labelling Modi a "liar" and the "number one terrorist of India according to Google." He also invited Modi to take part in a debate with him about Hinduism.

Naik claimed on 11 January 2020 that the Modi government approached him in September 2019 through an envoy and offered to provide him "safe passage" to India if he spoke in support of the government's move to abrogate Article 370 in Jammu and Kashmir. In a 14 January 2020 tweet, Congress leader Digvijaya Singh asked Modi to clarify Naik's claim of an offer of safe passage to India.

During a lecture held on 8 August 2019 in Kota Bharu, Kelantan state, Malaysia, Naik was asked about his response to right-wing Malaysian groups wanting Zakir Naik to be extradited out of Malaysia.

He replied, "Malaysia became fully Muslim. Then you had the Chinese coming, you had the Indians coming, the British coming. They are our new guests. You know, somebody called me a 'guest'. So I said before me [Naik is Indian] that the Chinese are the guest. They aren't born here. So if you want the new guest to go, first ask the old guest to go back."

In the same lecture, he also claimed that Hindus living in Malaysia had "100 times more rights" than the Muslim minority in India, and were more loyal to Indian PM Narendra Modi than to Malaysian PM Mahathir Mohamad. These comments sparked outrage across Malaysian society, being perceived as inciting racial and religious hatred and disrupting the peace and harmony between communities. By 15 August, four government ministers called for revocation of Zakir Naik's permanent residency and for him to be extradited to India. Citizens lodged a total of 115 police complaints against Naik.

On 16 August, Naik was questioned for about seven hours by the Royal Malaysia Police at Bukit Aman in Kuala Lumpur about his controversial statements, while PM Mahathir said that "If he is found to be doing detrimental things to the country, it will be necessary for us to take away his permanent resident status. And that case, of course, we may need to take action to prevent him from making such provocative speeches, which attempt to pit the different races against each other," adding that a public apology by Naik may not be "enough to assuage the anger of many people". Meanwhile, Sarawak, the largest state of Malaysia, banned Zakir Naik from entering the state on 15 August, while the state of Perlis barred him henceforth from speaking at public events on 16 August, followed by the state of Kedah on 17 August; Naik was scheduled to speak in both states. By 20 August, Sabah, Malacca, Penang and Selangor had joined the other three states in prohibiting Naik from speaking in public, thus barring him in 7 out of 13 Malaysian states. After another 10 hour-round of police hearings on 19 August, Free Malaysia Today reported that on 20 August the police had imposed a nationwide speaking ban on Zakir Naik, which the police confirmed to the Malay Mail.

By 19 August, Zakir Naik had had his lawyers file legal complaints against five Malaysian politicians for 'defamation', claiming that they had taken his statements out of context and thus unduly damaged his reputation. The next day he maintained that his statements had been taken out of context, but expressed 'heartfelt apologies for this misunderstanding', as it 'was never my intention to upset any individual or community.' The Indian PM Modi had criticized Naik's comments during a dialogue with Mahathir at the Eastern Economic Forum in September.

== Reception, awards, titles, and honors ==
Naik was ranked 89 on The Indian Express's list of the "100 Most Powerful Indians in 2010". He was ranked 82 in the 2009 edition. According to Praveen Swami, Naik is "perhaps the most influential Salafi ideologue in India". Sanjiv Buttoo says he is acknowledged as an authority on Islam, but is known for making negative remarks about other religions. Sadanand Dhume writes that Naik has a "carefully crafted image of moderation", because of his gentle demeanour, his wearing of a suit and tie, and his quoting of scriptures of other religions.

Year of award/honour	Name of award/honour	Awarding organisation/government
2013	Sharjah Award for Voluntary Work	Sultan bin Muhammad Al-Qasimi, Crown Prince and Deputy Ruler of Sharjah
2013	Dubai International Holy Quran Award – Islamic Personality of the Year	Mohammed bin Rashid Al Maktoum, Vice President & Prime Minister of UAE and Ruler of Dubai
2013	Tokoh Ma'al Hijrah 1435/2013 Award	Abdul Halim of Kedah, King and head of state of Malaysia
2015	Service to Islam – King Faisal Prize	The Custodian of the Two Holy Mosques, King Salman bin Abdulaziz Al Saud

== Controversies ==
Naik is currently a wanted fugitive from the Indian authorities on charges of terror financing, hate speech, inciting communal hatred, and money laundering.

Naik fled the country in 2016, and India's National Investigation Agency (NIA), has tried, unsuccessfully, to convince Interpol issue a red notice for Naik's arrest due to insufficient evidence.

On the basis of hate-speech laws, Naik's Peace TV's channel is banned in India, Bangladesh, Canada, Sri Lanka, and the United Kingdom.

Naik's Peace TV app, on the other hand, is not blocked in the same countries. Naik argues that his comments have been taken out of context multiple times.

The Islamic Research Foundation website describes Naik as "the ideologue and driving force behind Peace TV Network". Naik's website claims that the Islamic Research Foundation and Peace TV promote "Truth, Justice, Morality, Harmony and Wisdom for the whole of humankind". The Indian government banned the Peace TV channel in 2012. According to The New York Times in 2015, quoting an anonymous Indian journalist, the Mumbai police have barred him from holding conferences "because he stirs controversy", and Indian satellite providers have refused to broadcast his television channel, Peace TV. However, as of August 2019, Peace TV was still available in India through a free app in the Google Play Store, which had been downloaded over a lakh (100,000) times.

Following investigations by Ofcom in 2019, the broadcasting authority moved to suspend Peace TV's license to broadcast in the UK. In addition, Ofcom fined the former licence holders of Peace TV Urdu £200,000 and Peace TV £100,000 for breaking broadcasting rules. In April 2020, the Charity Commission for England and Wales opened a statutory enquiry into the registered charity Islamic Research Foundation, which has funded Peace TV.

=== Indian allegations of promoting terrorism ===
Author Praveen Swami argues that some of Naik's teachings are similar to those of organizations advocating violence, although Naik himself emphatically rejects terrorism. According to Swami, Naik's IRF has proved to be a "magnet" for figures linked to the Lashkar-e-Taiba, while his message has mesmerised violent Islamists, and his works "help make sense of the motivations of Indian recruits to the jihad".

In 2008, an Islamic scholar in Lucknow, Shahar Qazi Mufti Abul Irfan Mian Firangi Mahali, issued a fatwa against Naik, claiming that he supported Osama bin Laden, and that his teachings were un-Islamic. However, Naik claims that his speech was being taken out of context, and viewers noted that the speech aired several years before the deadly events of 9/11.

==== Criticism of Indian allegations ====
The allegations of Zakir Naik spreading terrorism have created adverse reactions in India. In January 2020, the Senior Indian Congress leader Digvijaya Singh tweeted a video of the Islamic preacher leveling allegations against PM Modi and HM Amit Shah. "Who disagrees with them 1 – convince them, 2- If he doesn't believe then threaten him 3- If he still does not believe then lure him with money. 4 – If he still does not agree, then defame him by making false accusations," Singh tweeted. Based on the response by Dr. Zakir Naik, Singh claims that the BJP follows the strategy of 'defaming individuals with false allegations'. In a sequence of tweets that included a video of Naik making allegations against PM Modi and HM Amit Shah, Singh claimed that if Modi and Shah do not formally repudiate Naik's accusations, then the allegations are 'correct.'

=== Indian Muslim opposition towards Naik ===
Asjad Raza Khan, the senior cleric of Bareilly, Shia Muslim cleric Kalbe Jawad, and Shahi Imam of West Bengal Noor ur Rahman Barkati are among some of the most powerful Islamic scholars in India who have criticized Naik's interpretation and knowledge of Islam and have described his views as "false", "mischievous", and "misleading". In 2007, reports claimed that Darul Uloom Deoband considered him a self-styled preacher unattached to any of the four orthodox Sunni Islamic schools of jurisprudence (fiqh) and therefore has issued many fatwas against Zakir Naik, rejecting him as being amongst the ghair muqallidin (a term used in Islam to describe someone who does not relate with the four madhabs viz. Hanafi, Hanbali, Sha'afi and Maliki) thereby appealing towards Muslims to avoid listening to his sermons. In 2016, a Darul Uloom spokesman clarified reports that although a few fatwas had been issued by Darul Uloom against Naik on legal matters, these were being "deliberately highlighted" by the media. The deputy vice chancellor of Darul Uloom, Abdul Khaliq Madrasi, came out in his support, saying: "We have bad differences of opinion with Zakir Naik. But he is recognized as an Islamic scholar the world over. We don't believe that he could be connected with terrorism in any way." In addition, many more academics under Sunni majority schools have acknowledged their ideological differences and have spoken out against targeting and tying Naik to terrorism. However, majority Shia schools of thought like the Shia National Front still demanded a CGI probe into Naik.

=== July 2016 Dhaka attack inspiration ===
After revealing the investigations of the Dhaka attack in July 2016 published by The Daily Star that a terrorist involved in the brutal killings followed Zakir Naik's page on Facebook and was influenced by Naik's speeches, The terrorist had posted sermons of Zakir Naik on social media where Naik urged "all Muslims to be terrorists" Indian Union Minister of State for Home Affairs Kiren Rijiju said, "Zakir Naik's speech is a matter of concern for us. Our agencies are working on this." He was then termed a controversial as well as a popular figure by the media. After 2 days in investigation, the Maharashtra State Intelligence Department (SID) gave a clean chit to Zakir Naik and said that Naik would not and cannot be arrested on his return to India as the probe ordered by the Maharashtra government did not find any other strong evidence to link Naik to terror-related activities. The Daily Star apologized to Naik over the Dhaka Terror Attack controversy and stated that they never blamed him for the attack. The newspaper quoted that it only reported how youth were misinterpreting his speeches. However, soon thereafter the Bangladesh Government banned the broadcast of Naik's Peace TV channel. Hasanul Haq Inu, the Information Minister, reasoned that "Peace TV is not consistent with Muslim society, the Quran, Sunnah, Hadith, Bangladesh's Constitution, our culture, customs and rituals".

When the National Investigation Agency arrested Mohammad Ibrahim Yazdani, the head of Islamic State's Hyderabad module in India, upon interrogation it was revealed that the operatives were influenced by Zakir Naik's sermons and wanted to establish Shariah law as in Islamic state

There have been media reports of Intelligence Agencies probing the alleged links between terror group Jamaat-ud-Dawa (JuD), and Naik's IRF. The JuD website is said to be referring to Zakir Naik's sermons & preachings.

In 2016, he admitted that Rahil Sheikh, involved in 2006 Mumbai train bombings was working as a volunteer for his organization Islamic Research Foundation (IRF) but he did not know Rahil personally. However, Naik also claimed that Rahil was removed from his office. Nearly 200 people died in the bombing attack and investigation revealed the bombers were influenced by Naik's preachings.

Referring to the deadly attacks in Bangladesh by terrorists, author Taslima Nasreen said that "Many Bangladeshi would-be-terrorists are inspired by Zakir Naik. He is not having machetes in hands. But his followers are having machetes in hands". She added that, "I'm not against Zakir Naik's free speech but I am against him for inciting violence. Fatwabaz should be banned from issuing."

==== Post-Dhaka attack death threats ====
On 13 July 2016, Vishva Hindu Parishad leader Sadhvi Prachi announced a reward of ₹50 lakh (US$53,000) to anyone willing to behead Zakir Naik. This came a day after a Shia group styling itself the "Hussaini Tigers" placed a ₹15 lakh (US$16,000) bounty on his head.

=== 2019 Sri Lanka Easter bombings inspiration ===
Zahran Hashim, the leader of the National Thowheeth Jama'ath which carried out the 2019 Sri Lanka Easter Bombings, had praised Naik for inciting Muslims without being banned and had asked "What can Sri Lankan Muslims do for Dr Zakir Naik?". After the attacks Sri Lankan cable TV channels stopped broadcasting PeaceTV.

Indian prime minister Narendra Modi denounced Naik in one of his electoral publicity visit in May 2019, saying that, Sri Lanka bombing was inspired by him and in spite of that the Congress supports Zakir Naik.

=== Hostility towards Muslim and Hindu minorities ===
The Times of India published a profile of Naik entitled "The controversial preacher" after he was banned from the United Kingdom. According to The Times, "the fact is that barring the band of Muslims whose bruised egos Naik suitably massages through his Islam supremacist talks, most rational Muslims and non-Muslims find his brand of Islam a travesty of the faith". The Times also claimed that "the Wahabi-Salafist brand of Islam, bankrolled by petro-rich Saudi Arabia and propagated by preachers like Naik, does not appreciate the idea of pluralism." The article quotes Muslim scholar Wahiduddin Khan: "Dawah, which Naik also claims to be engaged in, is to make people aware of the creation plan of God, not to peddle some provocative, dubious ideas as Naik does." He adds: "The wave of Islamophobia in the aftermath of 9/11 and the occupation of Iraq and Afghanistan have only added to the Muslims' sense of injury. In such a situation, when a debater like Zakir Naik, in eloquent English, takes on preachers of other faiths and defeats them during debates, the Muslims' chests puff with pride. A community nursing a huge sense of betrayal and injustice naturally lionises anyone who gives it a sense of pride. Never mind if it's false pride."

According to the Art of Living Foundation, Zakir Naik quoted verses from the Vedas out of context and tried to insult Hinduism and other polytheist religions in a debate with its founder – his talk was according to them, "misguiding and inciting people".

Indian journalist Khushwant Singh says he "disagree[s] with almost everything [Naik] has to say about misconceptions about Islam". Singh argues that Naik's pronouncements are "juvenile", and said "they seldom rise above the level of undergraduate college debates, where contestants vie with each other to score brownie points." Singh also says Naik's audiences "listen to him with rapt attention and often explode in enthusiastic applause when he rubbishes other religious texts".

Torkel Brekke, a professor of religious history in Norway, calls Naik a "very controversial figure" because of his rhetorical attack on other religions and other varieties of Islam. He writes that Naik is "strongly disliked" by many members of the Indian ulema for ignoring their authority and stating that anybody can interpret the Quran. Conservative Deobandi mullahs have accused Naik of "destroying Islam" by driving Muslims away from the correct religious authorities.

In Firstpost, reporter Sreemoy Talukdar wrote, "The smooth-talking televangelist's regressive and problematic teachings, thoroughly dissected and discussed threadbare, strike at the pluralist cultural component of our existence and promotes a version of Islam that is dreary and incompatible with the modern world."

=== Stance towards homosexuals and places of worship ===
In The Wall Street Journal, Sadanand Dhume criticised Naik for recommending the death penalty for homosexuals and for apostasy from the faith. He also criticised him for calling for India to be ruled by Shariah law. He added that, according to Naik, Jews "control America" and are the "strongest in enmity to Muslims." He maintained that Naik supports a ban on the construction of non-Muslim places of worship in Muslim lands as well as the Taliban's bombing of the Buddhas of Bamiyan. Dhume argues that people reportedly drawn to Naik's message include Najibullah Zazi, the Afghan-American arrested for planning suicide attacks on the New York subway; Rahil Sheikh, accused of involvement in a series of train bombings in Mumbai in 2006; and Kafeel Ahmed, the Bangalore man fatally injured in a failed suicide attack on Glasgow airport in 2007. He also stated that "unless Indians find the ability to criticise such a radical Islamic preacher as robustly as they would a Hindu equivalent, the ideal of Indian secularism would remain deeply flawed."

=== Controversial speeches ===
==== Debate on paedophilia ====
Zakir Naik's 2024 visit in Pakistan gathered controversy. In a lecture in October 2024, Dr. Naik had a debate with a Pashtun girl who was concerned about child sexual abuse in her region, with Dr. Naik's response being that there was no promotion of pedophilia in the Quran.

==== Statement on rape and murder ====
In October 2024, Zakir Naik sparked controversy by stating that individuals guilty of rape and murder could be forgiven by Allah if they sincerely repented. He outlined conditions for forgiveness, including acknowledging the crime, ceasing wrongdoing, pledging not to repeat it, and seeking mercy of Allah. Naik also suggested that women attire could contribute to sexual violence and if a woman dresses modestly but still becomes a victim, it is considered a test from Allah.

== Legal issues ==
Naik was denied entry into the United Kingdom and Canada in June 2010. Naik was forbidden to enter Canada after Tarek Fatah, founder of Muslim Canadian Congress, warned MPs of Naik's views. He was banned from entering the UK by the then Home Secretary Theresa May after arranging to give talks in London and Sheffield. May said of the exclusion order, "Numerous comments made by Dr. Naik are evidence to me of his unacceptable behaviour". Naik argued that the Home Secretary was making a political decision, not a legal one, and his lawyer said the decision was "barbaric and inhuman". He also claimed that his comments were taken out of context. The Hindi cinema producer Mahesh Bhatt supported Naik, saying the ban constituted an attack on freedom of speech. It was reported that Naik would attempt to challenge the ruling in the High Court. His application for judicial review was dismissed on 5 November 2010.

In 2016, during a press conference Naik claimed himself to be a non-resident Indian (NRI).

On 18 July 2017, India revoked Naik's passport following a recommendation from the National Investigation Agency (NIA). On 28 July 2017, the NIA declared Naik an offender and initiated a process to attach his assets. In December 2017, Interpol refused the Indian Government's request to issue a red corner notice (RCN) against Naik. In January 2018, the Tribunal judge criticised the Enforcement Directorate for attaching Naik's properties without mentioning any offenses in the chargesheet. The judge added: "In the last 10 years, the ED has done nothing to attach Asaram's properties, but in the case of Naik, I can see the ED working with quite a bit of speed".

In July 2019 Interpol refused to issue a Red corner notice against Naik after repeated requests by the Indian Government. Naik currently resides in Malaysia, where he has permanent resident status. The Indian government approached Interpol again in December 2019, alleging new facts and circumstances, but Naik argued that the new request superimposed claims of money laundering on the same religious activities of Islamic teaching that were the subject of the prior request. On 13 May 2020, the Modi-led government sent a formal request to Malaysia for Zakir Naik's extradition, which was later rejected. In 2021, Interpol rejected India's request for a Red Notice to provisionally arrest Zakir for questioning the very basis of invoking money laundering and hate speech charges against Naik in the country. "The fact that he raised money from his religious teachings and spent it is "irrelevant" and cannot amount to money laundering". Interpol's adjudicating panel noted in its order.

== Publications ==
- Naik, Dr. Zakir (2014). The Quran & Modern Science. Darussalam Publishers. GGKEY: 7L94R950BRY.
- Naik, Dr. Zakir (2013). The Quran and The Bible in The Light of Science (PB). Islamic Book Service. p. 124. ISBN 978-81-7231-927-4.
- Naik, Dr. Zakir (2010). Answers To Non Muslims Common Questions About Islam. Adam Publishers & Distributors. p. 80.
- Naik, Zakir (2010). Focus on Islam. Adam Publishers. p. 70. ISBN 978-81-7435-462-4.
- Naik, Zakir (2009). Rights of Women in Islam: Modern Or Outdated?. Adam Publishers. p. 80. ISBN 978-81-7435-571-3.
- Naik, Zakir (2008). Is non-vegetarian food permitted or prohibited for the human being?. Adam Publishers. p. 48. ISBN 978-8-1743-5570-6.
- Naik, Dr. Zakir (2008). Speeches of Dr. Zakir Naik. Talha Publication. p. 531. GGKEY: 7L94R950BRY.
- Naik, Dr. Zakir (2008). The Concept of GOD in Major Religions. Amazon Digital Services LLC – KDP Print US. p. 29. ISBN 978-1-07-845276-2.
- Naik, Zakir (2007). The Qur'an & Modern Science: Compatible or Incompatible?. Peace Vision. p. 80. ISBN 978-9-9609-8493-3.
- Naik, Zakir (2007). Similarities Between Hinduism & Islam. Adam Publishers. p. 80. ISBN 978-81-7435-567-6.
- Naik, Dr. Zakir (2003). IS THE QUR AN GOD WORDS. Adam Publishers & Distributors. p. 76. ISBN 978-81-7435-334-4.
- Naik, Dr. Zakir (2003). Answers to Non-Muslims Common Questions. Adam Publishers. ISBN 978-81-7435-543-0.
