= Abdur Raheem Green =

British convert to Islam (born 1964)

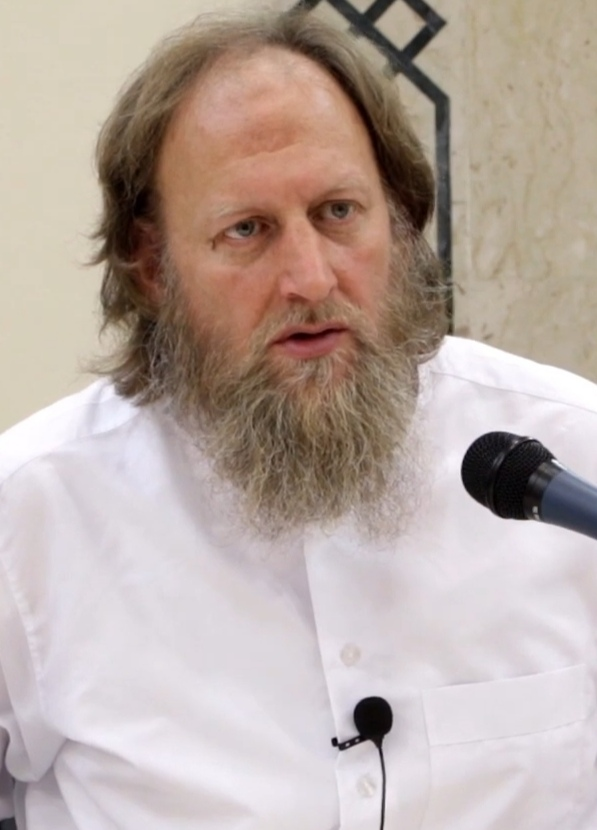
- Green in 2017

Personal life
- Born: Anthony Waclaw Gavin Green; September 1964 (age 62) Dar es Salaam, Tanzania
- Education: Ampleforth College
- Known for: Dawah
- Occupation: chairman of iERA, Islamic Speaker
- Website: iera.org

Religious life
- Religion: Islam
- Denomination: Sunni

YouTube information
- Channel: iERA
- Years active: 2009–present
- Subscribers: 383 thousand
- Views: 77.6 million
- Last updated: 12 May 2024

Abdur Raheem Green (born: Anthony Waclaw Gavin Green; September 1964) is a British Islamic preacher who is known in some Muslim communities for his work in Dawah, both in televised formal settings and informal contexts such as Hyde Park's Speakers Corner. He is the chairman of iERA, the Islamic Education and Research Academy.

== Early life ==
Green was born in Dar es Salaam, Tanzania. His father was a colonial administrator in the British Empire and his mother is Polish. His father was agnostic and his mother a devout Roman Catholic. Green was raised in the Roman Catholic faith from a young age.

Green attended a Monastic Roman Catholic boarding school, St Martin's Ampleforth at Gilling Castle, and then Ampleforth College. When he was 11, his father took a job in Cairo, and Green would travel to stay there during his school holidays. He studied history at the University of London, but did not complete his degree because of a growing disillusionment with what he regarded as the Eurocentric teaching of the British educational system.

== Conversion to Islam ==
At a young age, Green began to question his Roman Catholic upbringing. However, at the age of 19, he stated that he would "vigorously defend" the faith, even though he did not actually believe in it. He also practiced Buddhism for nearly three years, though never formally embraced it. In 1987, Green first became interested in Islam, picking up his first copy of the Qur'an. He embraced Islam in 1988.

== Personal life ==
Green has ten children. Whilst claiming two wives, Green was asked in the interview whether British law prohibits bigamy. Green responded: "It does. Yet several Britishers are bigamists." He mistakenly claimed "But those who practise bigamy can protect the second marriage under the provisions of 'common law wives'. Under this children out of such marriages are legitimate and wives inherit property."

== Controversies ==
In 2005, Green was barred from boarding a flight with a stopover in Brisbane because he appeared on the Australian government's "movement alert list". This was for extreme views, "including that Muslims and westerners cannot live peaceably together and that dying while fighting jihad is one of the surest ways to paradise and Allah's good pleasure." Some Australian Muslims argued that the Government had gone too far by stopping a man whose views they claim are now moderate.

In February 2009, the BBC current affairs programme Panorama reported that the Metropolitan Police had asked Green for advice. Green said that he was "part of the solution" to extremism, and that "participating in terrorist activities, violent revolution - is not something that I have ever thought was part of the religion of Islam." It was reported in 2010 that Green had given a two hour lecture at University College London's Islamic Society on 23 November 2005, in which Green said that though Osama Bin Laden's terrorist strategy was rational, Islam did not support it.

In October 2011, Green was banned from giving a scheduled lecture at Concordia University in Canada after concerns were raised over statements that he allegedly made about how men may treat their wives.

In July 2012, Green was banned from the Emirates stadium of Arsenal F.C.

In May 2014, the Telegraph reported that the iERA which Green chairs was being investigated by the Charity Commission "amid allegations that its leaders promote anti-Semitism and have called for homosexuals and female adulterers to be stoned to death." The Telegraph reported that Green "has been caught on camera preaching at Hyde Park Corner, calling for a Jewish man to be removed from his sight. 'Why don’t you take the Yahoudi [Jew] over there, far away so his stench doesn’t disturb us?' he can be heard to say."

In 2015, he was asked to withdraw from speaking at event Against Racism, Against Hatred held at St James' Park, Newcastle.
