= Yusuf Estes =

American Islamic preacher (born 1944)

Sheikh Yusuf Estes
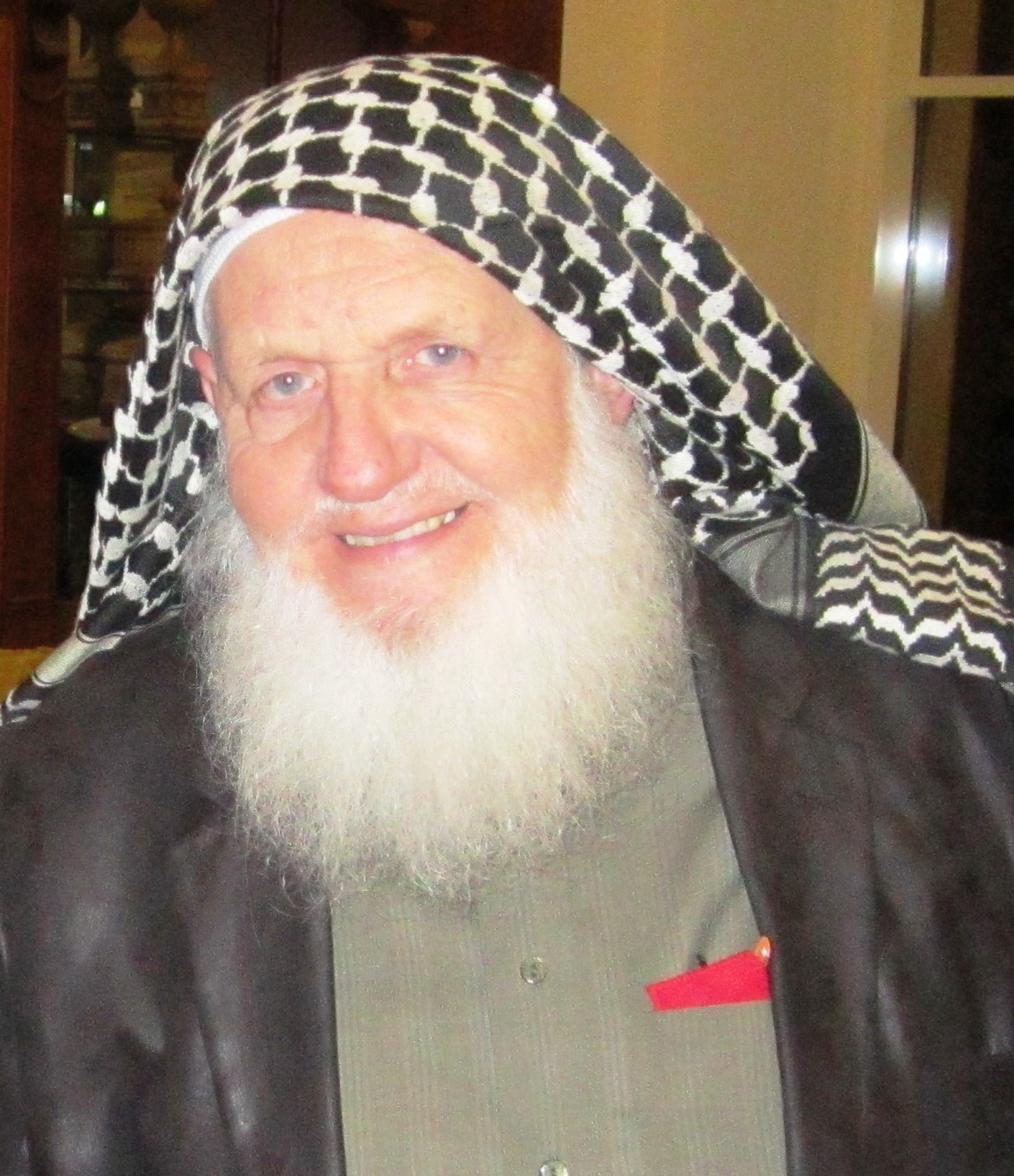
- Estes in 2012
- Born: Joseph Estes; 1944 (age 81–82); Midlothian, Texas, U.S.
- Education: Jones High School
- Title: Sheikh

Personal life
- Main interest(s): Sharia, Dawah

Religious life
- Religion: Islam
- Denomination: Sunni

YouTube information
- Channel: GuideUS TV
- Years active: 2013–present
- Genre: Islamic
- Subscribers: 71.10 thousand
- Views: 5.79 million
- Last updated: 3 July 2025
- Website: yusufestes.com

Sheikh Yusuf Estes (born 1944) is an American Salafi Islamic preacher and chaplain from Texas. Estes converted from Christianity to Islam in 1991. He served as a Muslim chaplain for the United States Bureau of Prisons during the 1990s, and as a delegate to the United Nations World Peace Conference for Religious Leaders held at the UN in September 2000.

== Career ==
Estes has served as a guest presenter and keynote speaker at various Islamic events. He is the founder and president of Guide US TV, a free-to-air internet and satellite television channel that broadcasts programs about Islam. In 2010, he was listed among the top 500 most influential Muslims. In August 2012, he was named the Islamic Personality of the Year at the Dubai International Holy Quran Award ceremony.

In November 2017, Estes was denied entry into Singapore due to views deemed divisive by the government, particularly his advice against Muslims celebrating Christmas and Hanukkah. The decision faced criticism, as he was entering as a tourist, not a speaker.

Estes explains why he isn't Catholic because he claimed that the Catholic Church was created 300 years before Jesus Christ was born, by Alexander the Great.

== See also ==
- List of American Muslims
