= Lolita San Miguel =

First-generation Pilates instructor

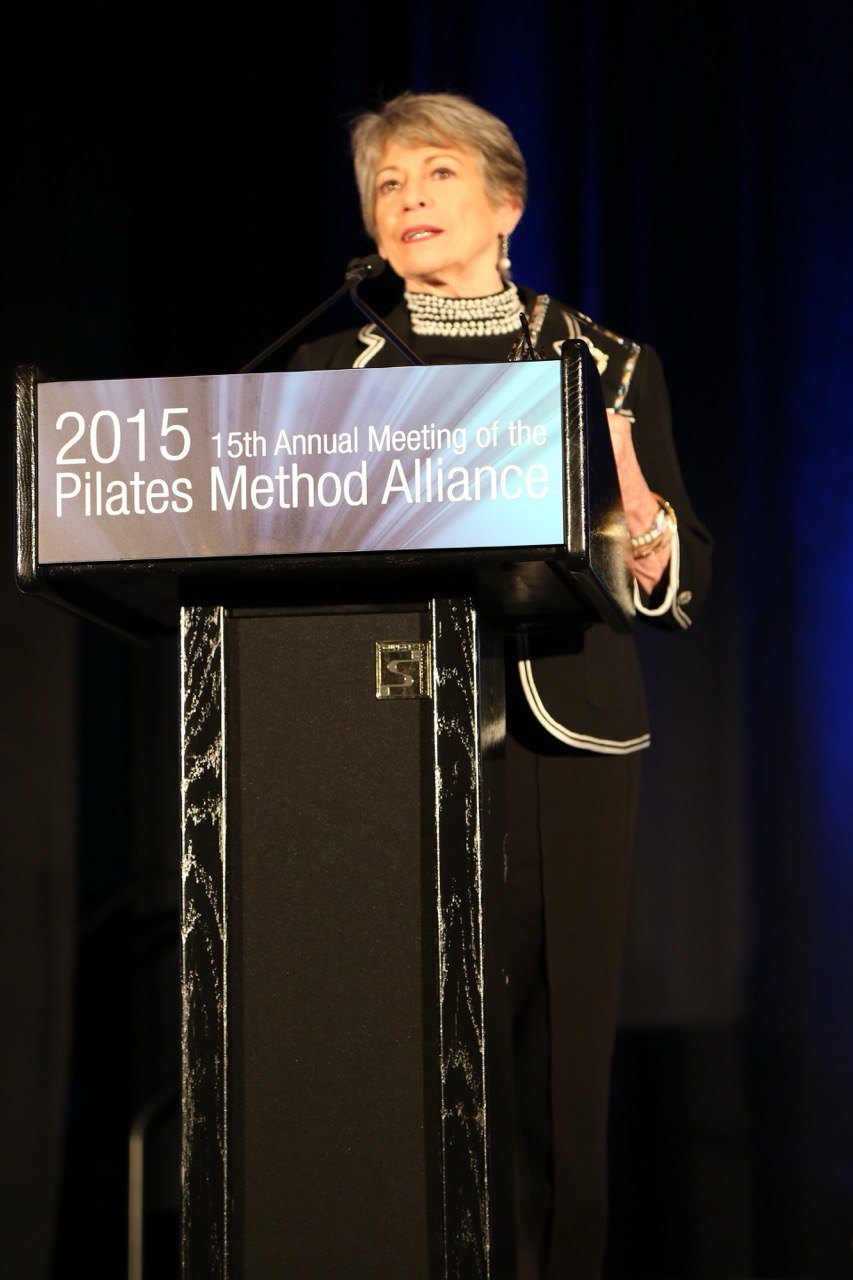
- Photo from 15th Annual Meeting of Pilates Method Alliance
- Born: October 9, 1934 (age 92); New York City, U.S.
- Citizenship: USA
- Website: http://www.lolitapilates.com

Lolita San Miguel (born October 9, 1934) is one of the few individuals certified by Joseph Pilates himself. She trained under Joseph and Clara Pilates and is the last of first-generation instructors still living, directly connected to the founder of the Pilates method.

== Biography ==
Lolita San Miguel, born on October 9, 1934, in New York City to Puerto Rican parents, is a distinguished figure in both the dance and Pilates worlds. She began her dance training at the age of 7 in Puerto Rico and later moved to New York, where she studied at the School of American Ballet.

After graduating from Performing Arts High School in 1952, she joined several prestigious ballet companies, including the Metropolitan Opera Ballet, where she performed as a soloist for over 10 years.

In 1958, after suffering a knee injury, San Miguel was introduced to the Pilates method at Carola Trier's studio, an experience that would shape her future career. She later sought out training from Joseph Pilates himself and, along with Kathy Grant, became one of the only two people ever certified by him to teach the Pilates method.

San Miguel went on to found Ballet Concierto de Puerto Rico in 1977, where she incorporated Pilates into the dancers' training regimen. Later, she established the Lolita San Miguel Pilates Master Mentor Program, which has trained teachers globally.

In 2005, at the age of 70, she stepped down from her role as Artistic Director of Ballet Concierto and shifted her focus to teaching Pilates on an international level. Since then, she has dedicated her time and energy to promoting and teaching the Pilates method globally, actively participating as a presenter at events such as The Pilates Method Alliance Annual Conference.

== Current activities ==
Since 2000, Lolita San Miguel has run her own company, Pilates Y Mas Inc. in Puerto Rico.

In May 2009, Lolita San Miguel launched her first Pilates Master Mentor Program group in Europe with participants from various countries. During the training, she visited Mönchengladbach, Germany, to celebrate Pilates Day with a free mat class. Surprised that Joseph Pilates was not well-known in his hometown, she organized another Pilates Day in 2010, and worked with local officials to establish a commemorative plaque in his honor. Since then, the congress founded by Lolita San Miguel continues to be held in Joseph Pilates' birthplace. Every two years, attendees from many countries around the world gather for this event.

Somewhere between 2013 and 2014, four years after launching the Pilates Master Mentor Program, Lolita San Miguel introduced Lolita's Legacy, a comprehensive 500-hour teacher-training program. Developed over two years, this program is now taught exclusively by certified educators in various countries worldwide.

Lolita San Miguel organized and directed an annual Pilates conference in Mönchengladbach until 2013, when she passed the responsibility to Kathy Corey, who has continued the event every two years since then. In 2019, the Pilates Heritage Congress attracted 250 participants, and a plaque was placed in front of Joseph Pilates' birthplace, officially naming the location "Pilates Platz".

In 2016, Lolita was informed by her disciple about the burial place of Joseph and Clara Pilates. Together with her colleagues and friends she put together an event to honor the memory of Joseph and Clara Pilates at Ferncliff Cemetery in New York City, which she repeated in 2018.

== Bibliography ==
My Enchanted Life: A Memoir - Independently published (February 26, 2021) — ISBN 979-8702445175

== See also ==
- Joseph Pilates
- Ron Fletcher
- Kathy Stanford Grant
