= Merrithew International =

Canadian health and fitness company

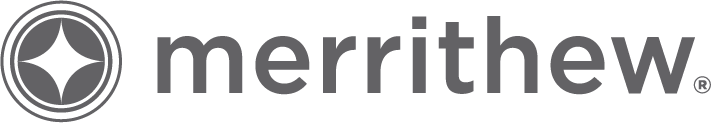
- Type: Incorporate
- Industry: Physical fitness
- Founded: Toronto, Ontario, Canada (1988)
- Headquarters: Toronto, Ontario, Canada
- Area served: Worldwide
- Key people: Lindsay G. Merrithew, Co-Founder, President, and CEO, Moira Merrithew, Co-Founder and Executive Director of Education
- Services: Pilates exercise
- Parent: Merrithew
- Website: www.merrithew.com

Merrithew International Inc. is a health and fitness company that specializes in the Pilates method of exercise by offering Pilates-focused education, as well as manufacturing and selling Pilates-focused equipment. The company was founded in 1988 by entrepreneur and actor, Lindsay Merrithew, and Moira Merrithew.

By 1991, the company’s first Stott Pilates studio was opened in Toronto, Canada. Later they established a manufacturing division to produce Pilates equipment and opened an educational division to train and certify instructors. The company started producing educational videos and created training centers worldwide. In 2022, private equity fund Onex Corporation purchased a majority stake in Merrithew International.

== History ==
Moira had been a dancer with the Bermuda Ballet, and principal dancer with the City Ballet of Toronto and the Atlantic Ballet Company, but had to retire when she was 24 due to chronic foot injuries stemming from her having broken her foot as a child. She was advised to explore Pilates by people at the Dancer Transition Resource Centre in Toronto, and she went to New York City to study with Romana Kryzanowska, a disciple of Joseph Pilates. By that time she had met Lindsay Merrithew, who was working in New York at the time. Lindsay received his business degree from Dalhousie University and then went on train as an actor at The Juilliard School in the drama department, Group 14.

In her own Pilates training and work, Moira found that there was not emphasis on establishing and strengthening a neutral spine posture, and also found that traditional Pilates didn't follow the sequence of exercises that had evolved in the field of dance, and she developed a version of Pilates that came to carry her maiden name as its brand.

The two of them moved back to Toronto in 1987, and in 1988 they opened a Pilates studio in their apartment and worked other jobs to make ends meet. Their business received a celebrity boost when Karen Kain, a principal dancer with the National Ballet of Canada started to take classes in their apartment; they managed to get the press to cover this, with Kain's help, and the business began to grow, allowing them to move to a studio. Lindsay had secured a small research grant from the National Research Council which allowed for their first patented aluminum Reformer to be built and tested for commercial use. As the company developed, in general Moira handled the training and program development, and Lindsay developed their proprietary line of equipment and also handled the business matters along with the sales and marketing.

== Training ==
Training became an important element of the business model from the beginning, as they eventually had to train more instructors for the studio, and they eventually created a training and certification program. For an instructor or instructor trainer to maintain Stott Pilates certification, he or she must attend a minimum number of courses and workshops each year; thereby keeping current with the method. Many Stott Pilates courses and workshops are part of the Continuing Education Credit (CEC) programme, and many of them are also recognized by outside organizations, including the American Council on Exercise (ACE).

In the mid-1990s, the company started to publish videos and DVDs of most of its programs, and in several languages. Publishing DVDs increased the awareness of the Stott Pilates method.

=== Technique and method ===
Stott Pilates is distinct from classical Pilates because of its integration of principles of exercise science, fascial fitness, and spinal rehabilitation. It is utilized as a regular mind-body intervention, as well as in rehabilitation and post-rehabilitation settings, by prenatal individuals, athletes, and more. Each class begins with a warm-up aimed at aligning the body and reducing tension in the neck and back. This method incorporates additional tools, such as stability balls, foam rollers, and BOSU balls for balance training. Unlike classical Pilates, which emphasizes pressing the lower spine into the floor, Stott Pilates maintains the natural curve of the lower spine.

The Stott Pilates method focuses on optimizing neuromuscular performance by emphasizing core stability and balancing muscle strength with flexibility. It incorporates five biomechanical principles: proper breathing to enhance oxygenation and muscle support; pelvic placement to stabilize the pelvis and lumbar spine; rib cage alignment to maintain proper thoracic positioning; scapular movement and stabilization to prevent neck and shoulder strain; and correct head and cervical spine positioning to avoid tension.

== Operations ==
Headquartered in Toronto, Canada, Merrithew International Inc. provides a curriculum of education and certification programs that includes Stott Pilates, the company’s premier brand, Zenga, Core, and Total Barre, among others. The primary audience for these programs are personal trainers and fitness instructors who want to be able to provide more in-depth Pilates instruction to their students. Since the company’s inception, Merrithew International has created training centers both within and outside of Canada. The company also operates a corporate training center in Toronto.

In addition to its curriculum of education programs, Merrithew International is a manufacturer and retailer of a range of Pilates equipment, such as its line of Pilates Reformers and Rehab Reformers and its stability barres and chairs.

In 2022, private equity fund Onex Corporation purchased a majority stake in Merrithew International. In 2023, the company released a set of musical albums that can be listened to along with its fitness programs.
