= Namrata =

Namrata is an Indian or Nepalese feminine given name that may refer to

- Namrata Brar, Indian-American journalist, investigative reporter and news anchor
- Namrata Mohanty, Indian Odia singer
- Namrata Purohit (born 1993), Indian Pilates instructor
- Namrata Rao (born 1981), Indian film editor
- Namrata Sawhney (born 1970), Indian actress, voice actress and singer
- Namrata Shrestha, Nepalese model and actress
- Namrata Shirodkar (born 1972), Indian actress, producer and former model
- Namrata Singh Gujral (born 1976), Indian-American director, producer and actor
- Namrata Thapa, Indian film and television actress
