= Stott Pilates =

Physical exercise method

Stott Pilates is one of the key methods of the Pilates physical exercise that was developed in Toronto in 1980s. The most significant difference between Stott Pilates exercise and Joseph Pilates's original method of the early 1900s is that Stott Pilates focused on having a neutral spine posture and generated a different sequence of exercises. Many Stott Pilates courses are CEC-approved and recognized by organizations like the American Council on Exercise (ACE).

== History ==
Moira Merrithew (née Stott) had been a dancer with the Bermuda Ballet, and principal dancer with the City Ballet of Toronto and the Atlantic Ballet Company, but had to retire when she was 24 due to chronic foot injuries stemming from her having broken her foot as a child. She was advised to explore Pilates by the Dancer Transition Resource Centre in Toronto, and she went to New York City to study with the American Pilates instructor Romana Kryzanowska, a disciple of the German physical trainer Joseph Pilates. Moira commented that relocating to New York was also "a very attractive idea as I had just met Lindsay [Merrithew]" who lived in the city. Lindsay received his business degree from Dalhousie University and then went on train as an actor at the Juilliard School in the drama department. In her own Pilates training and work, Moira found that there was not emphasis on establishing and strengthening a neutral spine posture. She also found that traditional Pilates did not follow the sequence of exercises that had evolved in the field of dance, and so she developed a version of Pilates that came to carry her maiden name as its brand.

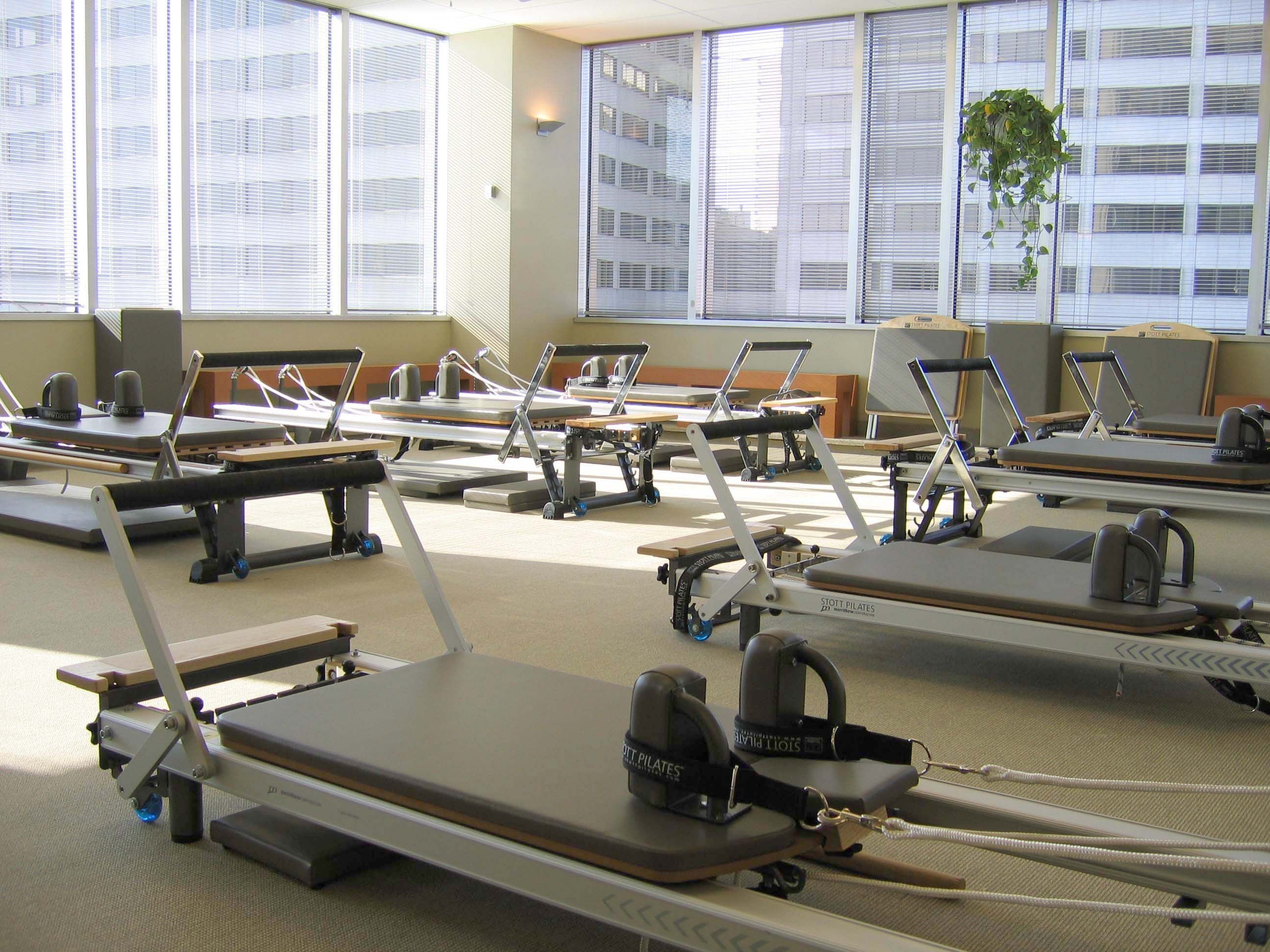
Reformer apparatuses in a Pilates studio in Toronto

Together, they moved back to Toronto in 1987 and subsequently opened a Pilates studio in their apartment in 1988. Their business received a celebrity boost when Karen Kain, a principal dancer with the National Ballet of Canada started to take classes in their apartment. With Kain's help, they received press coverage and the business began to grow, allowing them to move to a studio. Additionally, Lindsay secured a small research grant from the National Research Council which allowed for their first patented aluminum Reformer to be built and tested for commercial use. As the company developed, in general Moira handled the training and program development, and Lindsay developed their proprietary line of equipment and also handled the business matters along with the sales and marketing.

For an instructor or instructor trainer to maintain Stott Pilates certification, they must attend a minimum number of courses and workshops each year. Many Stott Pilates courses and workshops are part of the Continuing Education Credit (CEC) programme, and many of them are also recognized by outside organizations, including the American Council on Exercise (ACE). In the mid-1990s, the company started to publish videos and DVDs of most of its programs, and in several languages.

== Technique ==
Stott Pilates differs from classical Pilates by integrating exercise science, fascial fitness, and spinal rehabilitation principles. It is used for fitness, rehabilitation, post-rehabilitation, and by specific groups such as prenatal individuals and athletes. Classes start with a warm-up to align the body and reduce neck and back tension, often using tools like stability balls, foam rollers, and BOSU balls for balance training. Unlike classical Pilates, which flattens the lower spine, Stott Pilates maintains its natural curve. The method emphasizes core stability, neuromuscular performance, and a balance of strength and flexibility through five key principles: proper breathing, pelvic stabilization, rib cage alignment, scapular movement, and correct head and cervical spine positioning to prevent tension and strain.
