= Kâtibim =

Turkish folk song

External videos
- (Greek) Areti Ketime - Από ξένο τόπο - Üsküdara Giderken
- (Greek) Έχασα μαντήλι
- Δόμνα Σαμίου - Ανάμεσα Τσιρίγο - Domna Samiou
- Üsküdar'a gider iken (Katibim)
- Poletela dva bijela goluba
- Kâtibim, Safiye Ayla
- Kâtibim, Eartha Kitt
- Dimitri Kantemiroğlu - Madre de la gracia I Levy III 29 Sépharade Turquie
- Üsküdara gideriken - Katibim (Jordi Savall Version) 11 - belle vieille musique turque ottomane
- ΜΙΚΡΟ ΤΡΕΧΑΝΤΗΡΑΚΙ - Γλυκερία
- Έχασα μαντήλι
- Στου Πάπα το μπουγάζι - ΡΙΤΣΑ ΠΟΖΙΟΥ
- Καράβι κινδυνεύει Άννα & Αιμιλία Χατζηδάκη 1950
- Γλυκερία - Από ξένο τόπο
- Απο την Αθηνα ως τον Πειραια (Τραγούδια Μυτιλήνης & Μικράς Ασίας)
- Alexandru Mica - De-ai ști suflețelul meu
- Banat Iskandaria
- Keren Esther - Fel Shara
- Usnija Redzepova - Ruse kose curo imas
- Mesut Kurtis -Talama Ashku

"Kâtibim" ("my clerk"), or "Üsküdar'a Gider İken" ("while going to Üsküdar") is a Turkish folk song about someone's clerk (kâtip) as they travel to Üsküdar. The song takes the form of an Istanbul türkü. Many different songs with the same melody exist outside of Turkey, especially in the Balkans, with many different claims of origination for the tune.

== Lyrics and score ==

"Kâtibim"

Turkish	English translation
Üsküdar'a gider iken aldı da bir yağmur. Kâtibimin setresi uzun, eteği çamur. Kâtip uykudan uyanmış, gözleri mahmur. Kâtip benim, ben kâtibin, el ne karışır? Kâtibime kolalı da gömlek ne güzel yaraşır! Üsküdar'a gider iken bir mendil buldum. Mendilimin içine (de) lokum doldurdum. Kâtibimi arar iken yanımda buldum. Kâtip benim, ben kâtibin, el ne karışır? Kâtibime kolalı da gömlek ne güzel yaraşır!	On the way to Üsküdar, rain started to pour down. My clerk's frock coat is long, its skirt with mud. It seems the clerk just woke up, his eyes are languid. The clerk belongs to me, I belong to the clerk, what is it to others? How handsome my clerk looks with starched shirts! On the way to Üsküdar, I found a handkerchief. I filled the handkerchief with Turkish delight. As I was looking for my clerk, I found him next to me. The clerk belongs to me, I belong to the clerk, what is it to others? How handsome my clerk looks with starched shirts!

== Recordings ==
=== Recordings by Naftule Brandwein ===
"Der Terk in America"

The melody was imported to North America in the 1920s. The renowned klezmer clarinetist and self-proclaimed "King of Jewish music" Naftule Brandwein recorded a purely instrumental version with the title "Der Terk in America" in 1924. Brandwein was born in Peremyshliany (Polish Galicia, now Ukraine) and emigrated to the USA in 1909 where he had a very successful career in the early 1920s.

=== Recordings by Safiye Ayla and similar versions ===
A notable recording is that by Safiye Ayla from 1949. During the time of recording, Ayla was also a member of the assembly at the Istanbul City Conservatory. Classical composer Saygun included 'Variations on the Old Istanbul Folk Song Katibim (Varyasyonlar)' as the last part of his choral Op.22 Bir Tutam Kekik of 1943. Similar compositions of Ayla's "Kâtibim" have followed it, including:

- With lyrics, and incorporating an English adaptation by Stella Lee, in 1953 the song was recorded in the USA as "Uska Dara - A Turkish Tale / Two Lovers" by Eydie Gormé and Eartha Kitt. The interpretation of the internationally known vocal star Eartha Kitt, accompanied by an instrumental set, could be based on that of Safiye Ayla.
- Other modern composers such as Ali Darmar have also arranged the tune.
- A very early publication for the Central European region took place from around 1960 by the second volume of the series of the UNESCO Commission European Songs in the Origins, whose song notation for "Üsküdara gideriken" goes back to a written source from 1952. It shows striking similarities with the version sung by Ayla.

== Movie adaptations ==
Alongside Ayla, Zeki Müren's recording of Kâtibim was also very popular. Müren appeared as an actor in the 1968 film "Kâtip (Üsküdar'a Giderken)" directed by Ülkü Erakalın, in which his recording played an important role and which became very popular in Turkey and the Turkish diaspora.

== Versions from around the world ==
Many versions of the song can be found in countries neighboring Turkey and beyond, usually with entirely different lyrics. A documentary film entitled Whose is this song? and an international youth project called Everybody's Song documented many of these versions.

=== Europe ===
- Albania: The tune in Albanian is titled "Mu në bashtën tënde", which has some variations by different artists. In 1993, the song was said to be a part of the repertoire in Albania, for example, of the Roma musicians who tried to revive it in the traditional Turkish way.
- Bosnia and Herzegovina: The Bosnian adaptations of the song include a traditional Sevdalinka known as "Oj, djevojko Anadolko, budi moja ti", meaning "Oh Anatolian girl, be mine" and a Qasida called "Zašto suza u mom oku", meaning "Why are my eyes weeping?".
- Bulgaria: The melody comes in the form of a Bulgarian love song "Černi oči imaš libe" (Bulgarian: "Черни очи имаш либе") and as a hymn of resistance to the Ottoman Empire in the Strandzha Mountains ("Ясен месец веч изгрява : "Jasen mesec več izgrjava").
- Greece: In Greece, the song is known under different names, including: "Μικρό τρεχαντηράκι" ("Little trehantiri"), "Ήχασα μαντήλι" ("I lost a handkerchief"), "Στου Πάπα το μπουγάζι" ("In the Pope's strait"), "Ανάμεσα Τσιρίγο" ("Between Kythira"), "Από ξένο τόπο" ("From a foreign place"), "Από την Αθήνα ως τον Πειραιά" ("From Athens to Pireas"), "Ο Βαγγέλης" ("Vangelis"), and "Εσκουτάρι" ("Eskoutari"). One of the best known Greek interpreters of the song is Glykeria.
- Hungary: Tamás Daróci Bárdos adapted the song with the title "Üszküdárá"
- North Macedonia: A performance of the Macedonian version of the song ("Ој Dеvојčе, Devojče") comes from the musician Toše Proeski (Тоше Проески), who was described by the BBC as "Elvis Presley of the Balkans", and who also worked as a UNICEF ambassador. A less known version of the song but one that more closely follows the original melody is Oj ti Paco Drenovčanke (Ој ти Пацо Дреновчанке).
- Romania: There is also a Romanian version of the song called "De ai ști, suflețelul meu" translated as "If you knew, my soul" collected and published by Anton Pann in the 1850s.
- Serbia (Formerly Yugoslavia): Kâtibim in the Serbian version is called "Ruse kose curo imaš" (Serbian:"Ај, русе косе цуро имаш") meaning "Blonde hair you have, girl", traditionally sung in southeastern Serbian dialect. During the 1950s, the song has also been featured in the popular Yugoslav film "Ciganka" (Serbian: "Циганка") meaning "Gypsy". There is another version in Serbian titled "Полетела два бијела голуба" meaning "Two white doves are flying" (recording from 1910)

=== Middle East ===
- A multilingual version called "Fel Shara" exists, with lyrics in Arabic, French, Italian, Spanish and English. It was popularized by Gloria Levy, where it appeared as a track on her album "Sephardic Folk Songs".
- A traditional folk song in the Arab world with the same melody is known as "Ya Banat Iskandaria" (Arabic: "يا بنات اسكندريّة") meaning "Oh Girls of Alexandria". The song was later recorded by Lebanese Mohammed El-Bakkar around 1957 in his album named "Port Said".
- Another Arabic version of the Levantine folklore, mostly sung as part of the Aleppine genre, is "Ghazali Ghazali" (Arabic:"غزالي غزالي") meaning "My Gazelle".
- The melody is shared by "Talama Ashku Gharami" (Arabic: "طالما أشكو غرامي"), a traditional Arabic poem or Qasida for Muhammad and is similar to the Hebrew piyut Yigdal. It is considered highly devotional to Muhammad.
- There is also another Arabic adaptation by Al Mulla Othman Al Mosuli named Ya Athouli la taloumni (يا عذولي لا تلمني).

=== South Asia ===
- Afghanistan: Another version of the melody is known from Afghanistan , which was sung by Uzbek singer Taaj Mohammad.
- Bangladesh: The Bengali adaptations of this tune known as "Tribhuboner Priyo Muhammad" (Bengali: "ত্রিভুবনের প্রিয় মোহাম্মদ"), "Shukno Patar Nupur Paye" (Bengali: "শুকনো পাতার নূপুর পায়ে") and "Rumjhum Jhum Jhum" (Bengali: রুমঝুম ঝুম ঝুম) in 1935s were composed by the national poet Kazi Nazrul Islam. It is thought that he learned the melody while he was fighting in the Middle East during World War I. "Tri-vuboner priyo Muhammad" is an Islamic Song about Muhammad. On the contrary, the song "Shukno Patar Nupur Paye" incorporated an inspirational theme of celebrating spontaneity which the young have and the old lack. In the song he appreciates how a young girl moves like a whirlwind and smiles like the shimmering ripples of water. The song "Rumjhum Jhum Jhum" praises the monsoon rain of Bengal. In 2026, Coke Studio Bangla mashed up the Turkish-language song "Üsküdar'a Gider İken" with Nazrul's Bengali-language song "Room Jhoom" as the debut song of the franchise's 4th season.
- Pakistan: A Turkish-Urdu mash-up version titled "Ishq Kinara - Üsküdar'a Gider Iken" was performed on the Pakistani television program Coke Studio by Sumru Ağıryürüyen and Zoe Vicajji in 2013.
- India: In the 1956 Indian film Taj, there is a Hindi-language song titled "Jhoom Jhoom Kar Chali Akeli" by Hemanta Mukherjee, which has similarity with Katibim. In the 2012 Indian film Agent Vinod there is a Hindi-language song titled "I'll Do the Talking"; the song is a partial interpolation of "Rasputin". Kâtibim's original tune is easily guessed in this song.

=== Southeast Asia ===
- Indonesia: The melody of this song is used for Banser march, with modified lyrics.
- Malaysia and Singapore: Alangkah Indah di Waktu Pagi (A Beautiful Morning) in Ali Baba Bujang Lapok is a song originally tuned from "Kâtibim".

=== Miscellaneous ===
- Camille Saint-saens quotes the melody in the second section of his "Souvenir d'Ismaïlia" Op. 100

=== Modern adaptations ===
- Loreena McKennitt's studio album An Ancient Muse (2006) has a track named "Sacred Shabbat", which has the same tune as Kâtibim.
- Jamaican artist Ken Boothe recorded the song as "Artibella".
- Kadebostany remade the song as "Maybe The War Is Over" (2013).
- Pink Martini's studio album Get Happy (2013) contains a version of this song.
- Sami Yusuf's album Barakah (2016) has a track called "I Only Knew Love ('Araftul Hawa)" is also based on a similar tune.
- The third movement of Fazil Say's violin concerto "1001 Nights in the Harem" heavily quotes the tune.
- The melody in Boney M's 1978 Euro disco hit single "Rasputin" has been compared to that of Kâtibim, but the band denied any similarity. However, during an episode of the BBC podcast "Soul Music", Boney M lead singer Liz Mitchell stated "I've heard that it was an old Turkish folk song that was owned by a Tunisian. So we bought it from a Tunisian."
- The video game Civilization VI's theme song for Arabia is based on Ya Banat Iskandaria.
- Iranian artist Farya Faraji's "Aπό ξένο τόπο & Üsküdara Giderik'en" (2023) is an arrangement of the song featuring both Greek and Turkish lyrics as well as Greco-Turkish instrumentation.
