= Carola Trier =

American dancer

Carola Strauss Trier (1913–2000) was a German dancer, acrobat, contortionist, and later a teacher, lecturer, and practitioner.

== Biography ==
Trier was the second daughter of German chemist and philosopher Eduard Strauss and Beatrice Rosenberg, an American citizen. She attended the Philanthropin in Frankfurt am Main, and then studied at the Laban School. Her family lived in Europe until the Second World War, emigrating to the United States in 1938, while she initially stayed in Germany, then emigrated to France. For reason of being a German, she was sent to the Gurs internment camp in France, from which she was finally released with the help of fellow dancer Marcel Neydorf. Together, they moved to the zone libre, and she was able to immigrate to New York in 1942, shortly before the zone libre was occupied, leading to thousands of Jews being detained, with most then being sent to Auschwitz. Neydorf stayed in France, as he did not receive a US visa.

Regarded as a potential enemy alien in the United States, she was initially interned in Fort Howard until she was granted refugee status. She moved to New York, married Edgar Trier and supported herself in the United States as a dancer, acrobat, and most notably a roller-skating contortionist. A devastating injury which occurred in 1950 brought her to Joseph and Clara Pilates, founders of the Pilates method of exercise and strength training. Throughout the 1950s, she was trained by the Pilates couple. She opened her own Contrology studio in 1960. According to second-generation master teacher Jillian Hessel, Trier was "the first person to open a studio with Joe Pilates' blessing". Her assistants included Romana Kryzanowska and Kathy Grant. Trier later furthered her anatomical knowledge at New York City’s Lenox Hill Hospital, where she aided Dr. Henry Jordan with patient rehabilitation and research. Trier combined her medical and Pilates experiences to develop various exercises and stretching techniques for dancers, many of which are still in use.

In 1982, Trier authored a book for children entitled Exercise, What it is, What it Does, which introduced and emphasized the benefit and enjoyment of exercising both alone and with friends. Trier was an active teacher, lecturer, and practitioner until the late 1980s, serving as a coach for choreographer Gloria Contreras until 1985. She died in New York City on October 28, 2000, at the age of 89.
