= Nazrul Geeti =

Songs composed by Nazrul Islam

Nazrul Sangeet
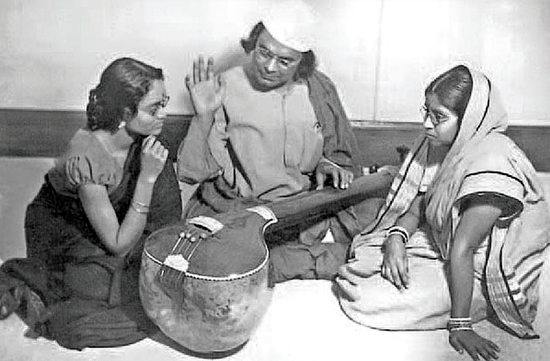
- Nazrul teaching Nazrul Sangeet
- Etymology: Songs and music composed by Kazi Nazrul Islam
- Cultural origins: Early 20th century, Bengal

Regional scenes
- Bangladesh and India (West Bengal, Tripura, Jharkhand and Assam)

Nazrul Geeti (Bengali: নজরুল গীতি; lit. 'music of Nazrul') also known as Nazrul Sangeet (Bengali: নজরুল সঙ্গীত), refers to the songs written and composed by Kazi Nazrul Islam, who is the national poet of Bangladesh. Nazrul Geeti incorporate revolutionary notions as well as spiritual, philosophical and romantic themes. Nazrul wrote and composed nearly 4,000 songs (including gramophone records), which are widely popular in Bangladesh and India. Some of the most notable Nazrul Sangeet include Notuner Gaan, the national marching song of Bangladesh and O Mon Romzaner Oi Rozar Sheshe, a Bengali Islamic song on the festival of the Bengali celebration of Chand Raat and Eid-ul-Fitr.

== Background ==
Nazrul showed signs of keen poetic and musical talent at a young age and started writing songs when he was a member of a Leto group (folk musical group). Following Kazi Bazle Karim, his uncle and a leader of a Leto group, he became an expert in composing songs and setting them to tunes. Joining the Leto group enhanced his musical career and significantly impacted the shaping of his future musical life. At a very young age he was excelled in composing songs in different languages, apart from the Bengali language. He met Satish Kanjilal, a teacher of Searsol School who had an interest in classical music and some mastery over it. Observing Nazrul's irresistible inclination to music, Mr. Kanjilal imparted him some lessons on classical music. Later Nazrul widened his knowledge on music when he was serving as a Havilder in Karachi Barrack under Bengal Regiment. He learned a great deal of Persian language, literature, and music with the help of a religious teacher from Punjab attached with the regiment.

== Nazrul Islam's musical style ==
=== Revolutionary mass music ===
The mass music and poems of Kazi Nazrul Islam have been widely used during the Indian Independence Movement and Bangladesh Liberation War. The music is highly motivational and revolutionary in nature with strong and powerful words and captivating tunes. It talks about the extremities of everything. The lyrics of those songs are provoking, as they talk against conservatism and about life on a broader parameter of philosophy and spirituality. The beauty of Nazrul's mass music lies in the freedom of its expression, which also drew immense criticism. However, those who understood its philosophy praised the courage and straightforwardness.

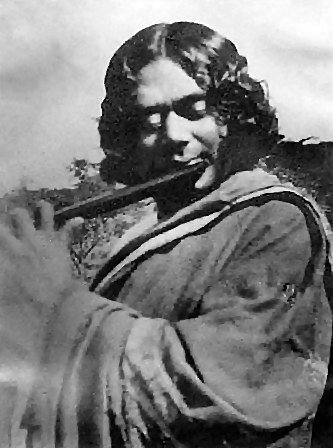
Kazi Nazrul Islam playing flute in 1926, Chittagong

=== Ghazal ===
Nazrul's acquaintance with the tradition of Persian Ghazals, a form of love songs, was very significant in the sense that it paved the base of his successful efforts in composing Bengali Ghazals which he undertook by 1927–28. Bengali Ghazal is, it can be mentioned outright, an innovation by Kazi Nazrul Islam alone. It served as the first mass-level introduction of Islam into the mainstream tradition of Bengali music.

== Historical influence ==
Nazrul used his music as a major way of disseminating his revolutionary notions, mainly by the use of strong words and powerful, but catchy, tunes. Among the revolutionary songs, Karar Oi Louho Kopat (Prison-doors of Steel) is best known and has been used in several movies, especially those made during the pre-independence period of Bangladesh.

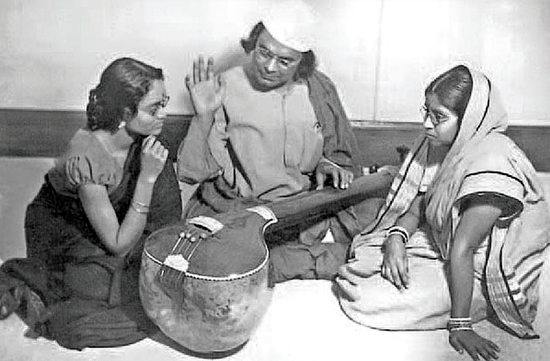
Nazrul teaching "Nazrul Geeti"

Nazrul Geeti has recently been translated and recorded in Oriya (an Indian language) in the form of a studio album.

== Notable songs ==
- Dolan Chapa (name of a faintly fragrant monsoon flower), poems and songs, 1923
- Bisher Bashi (The Poison Flute), poems and songs, 1924
- Bhangar Gan (The Song of Destruction), songs and poems, 1924 proscribe in 1924
- Chhayanat (The Raga of Chhayanat), poems and songs, 1925
- Chittanama (On Chittaranjan), poems and songs, 1925
- Dur Dweepo-bashini, chini tomare chini, 1934
- Samyabadi (The Proclaimer of Equality), poems and songs, 1926
- Puber Hawa (The Eastern Wind), poems and songs, 1926
- Sarbahara (The Proletariat), poems and songs, 1926
- Sindhu Hindol (The Undulation of the Sea), poems and songs, 1927
- Jinjir (Chain), poems and songs, 1928
- Pralaya Shikha (Doomsday Flame), poems and songs, 1930 proscribed in 1930
- Gumaite Dao Sranto Rabire (Let the tired Sun(Rabindranath) sleep), poems and songs, 1941.
- Shesh Saogat (The Last Offerings), poems and songs, 1958
- Notuner Gaan (The Song of Youth), 1928, National March of Bangladesh
- O Mon Romzaner Oi Rozar Sheshe Elo Khushir Eid, composed for Abbasuddin Ahmed, 1932
- Tribhubaner Priya Muhammad (Muhammad the beloved of three dimensions), composed for Abbasuddin Ahmed, 1935

== Notable singers of Nazrul Sangeet ==
- Abbasuddin Ahmed
- Shusmita Anis
- Ferdous Ara
- Firoza Begum
- Niaz Mohammad Chowdhury
- Alaka Das
- Chittaranjan Das
- Manas Kumar Das
- Sudhin Das
- Tapas Kumar Das
- Kamal Dasgupta
- Kanan Devi
- K C Dey
- Purabi Dutta
- Anup Ghoshal
- Anup Jalota
- Nashid Kamal
- Anup Barua
- Sabiha Mahboob
- Sadya Afreen Mallick
- Namrata Mohanty
- Manabendra Mukhopadhyay
- Manna Dey
- Mohammed Rafi
- Ferdausi Rahman
- Juthika Roy
- Madhuri Chattopadhyay
- Ila Basu
- Shaheen Samad
- Kumar Sanu
- Indrani Sen
- Anuradha Paudwal
- Nilufar Yasmin
- Sandhya Mukhopadhyay
- Sujit Mustafa
- Ila Ghosh
- Angur Bala devi
- Indu Bala
- Shanta Apte
- Jnanendra Prasad Goswami
