= Kathy Stanford Grant =

Dancer, choreographer and Pilates instructor

- Born: Kathleen Brown; August 1, 1921; Boston, Massachusetts, US
- Died: May 27, 2010 (aged 88); New York City, US
- Known for: Pilates, dance

Kathleen "Rusty" Stanford Grant (August 1, 1921 – May 27, 2010) was an African American dancer, choreographer, and Pilates instructor.

== Early life and education ==
Kathleen Stanford Grant, also known as Rusty Stanford, was born Kathleen Brown in Boston, Massachusetts on 1 August 1921. She gained the surname Grant when she married the attorney Jim Grant in 1963.

Grant was the recipient of a scholarship to attend the Boston Conservatory of Music, where she studied from 1931 to 1936.

== Career ==
=== Dance ===
Grant moved to New York City to work as a dancer. Because of her colour it wasn't easy to work on Broadway as a dancer, but she began in the night clubs of Harlem, including Zanzibar and Club Ebony before later getting roles in the Broadway productions of Finian's Rainbow and Kiss Me, Kate.

Grant toured Europe, the Middle east, Africa, and South America with Claude Marchant from 1950 to 1954.

== Pilates ==
In 1954 Grant required surgery on her knee due to an injury. The recovery from that surgery was slow and left her in pain. Dancer Pearl Lang suggested Grant attend Pilates' studio, where she met Joseph Pilates and began regaining the use of her leg. Grant was interested in this new technique, and in 1967, having studied under Pilates and completed 2,200 hours of training Grant was one of only two people to get a qualification from him to teach his work. The other was Lolita San Miguel.

Grant used this experience and worked with Carola Trier at her Pilates Studio before becoming director of the Pilates Gym at the Henri Bendel Department Store. She went on to join the faculty of NYU Tisch School of the Arts. Grant also travelled extensively across the US teaching Pilates.

== Other activities ==
Grant was administrator and company manager of the Dance Theatre of Harlem, and director of the Clark Center for the Performing Arts.

She was also a member of the Dance Panel of the National Endowment for the Arts.

== Death ==
Grant died on 27 May 2010, aged 88.
