= Shopno Jabe Bari =

- Agency: Grey Advertising Bangladesh
- Client: Grameenphone
- Language: Bengali
- Running time: 3 minutes
- Product: Telecommunication
- Release dates: 2009 (Shopno Jabe Bari 1); 31 August 2016 (Shopno Jabe Bari 2)
- Directed by: Ramya Khan (2009); Shahriar Palak (2016)
- Music by: Habib Wahid
- Production company: Prekkhagriho
- Country: Bangladesh

Shopno Jabe Bari (Bengali: স্বপ্ন যাবে বাড়ি, lit. 'Dreams will go home') is a franchise of Bangladeshi television commercials by Grameenphone. First aired in 2009, the commercials depict the story and feelings of the homebound people in the occasion of Eid. The jingle of the commercials, composed by Habib Wahid, has been widely acclaimed as the symbolic song for the homebound people of Bangladesh.

== Background ==
Eid is the main religious festival for the Bengali Muslims. Many people living away from home return to celebrate the festival with the near ones, which results a large migration of homebound people in the country annually. For many people, the moment carries an enthusiasm and deep feelings. Various advertisements have been created capturing this festive atmosphere.

== Commercial ==
Originally, two commercials were made with the same title, the first one in 2009 and the second one in 2016. The first one was directed by Ramya Khan, while the second one was directed by Shahriar Palak. The general theme of both commercials is the story of one or more men and woman living in Dhaka and returning home, highlighting the "exhilaration of a daughter upon returning home to her sister and mother, a man to his beloved wife and two friends to their group of friends they grew up with", accompanied by the jingle playing in the background.

In 2025, the commercial was remade as a 3-minute musical film directed by Piplu R. Khan.

=== Jingle ===
The commercials carry a jingle (theme song) with the same title. The music was composed and arranged by Habib Wahid. The jingle of the first commercial was written by Anika Mehjabin, at the time an employee at Grameenphone, and sung by Milon Mahmud. The jingle of the second commercial was written by Russell Mahmud and sung by Mithun Chakra. In the 2025 remake, the singer was Dola Rahman.

== Controversies ==
In 2017, there were allegations that the melody of the trailer song for Indian-Bengali language TV channel Zee Bangla's drama series Joyee was copied from the melody of the second jingle.

== See also ==
- O Mon Romzaner Oi Rozar Sheshe
- Music of Bangladesh
- List of festivals of Bangladesh
