= Elina Pilates =

Spanish manufacturer of Pilates equipment

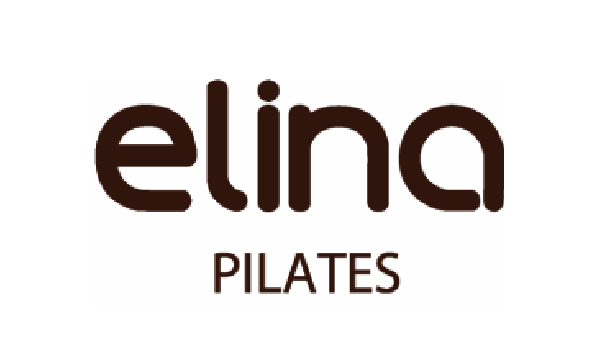
- Industry: Pilates equipment
- Founded: 2007
- Headquarters: Spain
- Website: elinapilates.com

Elina Pilates is one of the main designers and manufacturers of Pilates machines.

== History ==
Elina Pilates was founded in 2007 in Navarra, Spain. The company was founded in Spain and later expanded its distribution internationally, supplying equipment to Pilates studios, physiotherapy clinics, and training centers across Europe, the Americas, and other regions. Its main headquarters are located in Spain.

== See also ==
- Physical medicine and rehabilitation
