= Without You (Sami Yusuf album) =

Demo album / Leaked album by Sami Yusuf
- Released: 17 January 2009
- Recorded: 2005–2008
- Genre: Spiritique
- Length: 37:44
- Label: Awakening

Sami Yusuf chronology
My Ummah (2005)	Without You (2009)	Wherever You Are (2010)

Without You is the third album by British singer Sami Yusuf, released on 17 January 2009, following the release of his chart-topping albums Al-Muʽallim and My Ummah. It was the last album Yusuf made with his record company, Awakening Music, after a controversy.

== Controversy ==
Sami Yusuf claimed that this album was released without his prior "blessings nor consent". He stated: "I therefore wish to make it perfectly clear that an album comprised of any such recordings could only be put on to the market against my wishes and without my approval." Yusuf subsequently stated on his website that the album was released without his knowledge or consent, and is a compilation of demos and sketches with a quality inferior to his standards. He has called for fans to boycott it. The contractual dispute lasting from 2008 to 2009 lead to Yusuf legally separating from Awakening Records.

== Re-release alterations ==
Yusuf has edited many of the tracks on this album and re-released them on his latter albums that have been released under his current record label ETM International, this includes the tracks, "Without You" and "He Is There", the latter being relabeled as "In Every Tear, He Is There" for the album Wherever You Are. Also, tracks such as "Sallou" (relabeled as "It's a Game") and "Never Never" (relabeled as "All I Need") were also altered and re-released on the album Salaam. "Forever Palestine" was edited and released as a free download on Yusuf's official website when this album was released in 2009.

== Track listing ==
No.	Title	Length
1.	"Asma Allah"	4:57
2.	"Without You"	3:27
3.	"My Only Wish"	0:59
4.	"Forever Palestine"	3:43
5.	"He Is There"	4:04
6.	"Sallou"	4:05
7.	"A Thousand Times"	3:32
8.	"Never Never"	3:51
9.	"Anything For You"	4:38
10.	"Salutation"	1:36
11.	"Not In My Name"	4:34
Total length:		39:30
