= PiYo =

Exercise program

PiYo is an 8-week exercise program that is a blend of Pilates and Yoga. It incorporates dynamic, flowing sequences that build muscle and burn calories, making it suitable for various fitness levels.
