= Namrata Purohit =

Indian weightlifter

Purohit
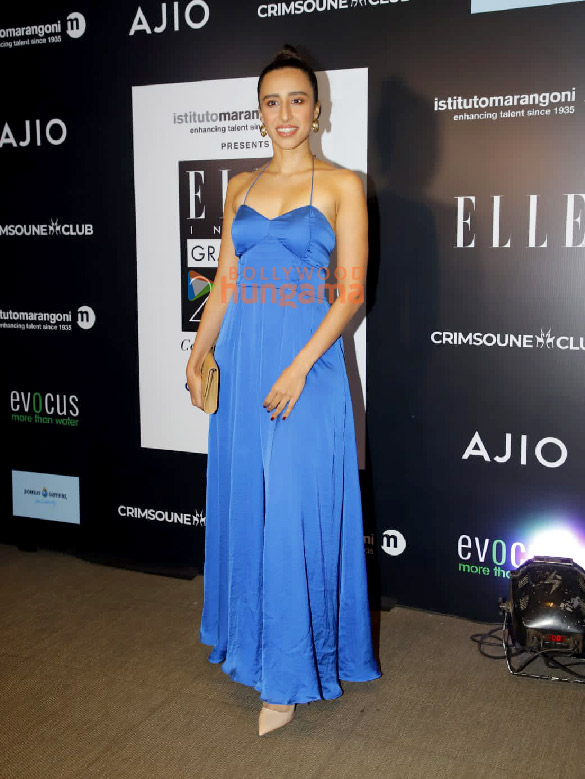
- Namrata Purohit at Elle India Graduate 2023

Personal information
- Nationality: Indian
- Born: Gwalior, Madhya Pradesh, India
- Height: 1.74 m (5 ft 9 in)
- Weight: 73 kg (161 lb)

Sport
- Country: India
- Sport: Weightlifting
- Event: weightlifting
- Coached by: Vijay Sharma

Achievements and titles
- National finals: 5 Time National champion, India record holder
- Personal bests: Snatch 143kg, clean jerk 173 kg
Medal record
Men's weightlifting
Representing India
National Weightlifting Championships
| Gold medal – first place | 2018 Ranchi | 69 kg |
| Gold medal – first place | 2019 Visakhapatnam | 73 kg |
| Gold medal – first place | 2020 Kolkata | 73 kg |
| Gold medal – first place | 2021 Patna | 73 kg |
| Gold medal – first place | 2022 Bengaluru | 73 kg |

Namrata Purohit is an Indian weightlifter from Gwalior, Madhya Pradesh. She serves in the Indian Army.

== Early life ==
Purohit's father Samir Purohit is a celebrity fitness expert and co-founder of The Pilates Studio. Born in Mumbai, India, Namrata completed her Major in economics at Jai Hind College and her Master’s of Science in Sports Management at Loughborough University. She was a national-level squash player and state-level football player. When she was 16, Purohit fell off a horse and had to undergo a knee surgery that ended her sporting career in squash.

== Pilates career ==
After her surgery, under her father’s advice, she started practicing Pilates. She then went on to study courses on Pilates from Lindsay G. Merrithew. She became the youngest certified Stott Pilates instructor in the world and is also a certified Barre instructor. She consequently founded The Pilates Studio with her father, the first Pilates studio to offer both pilates and a simulated altitude training room.

Her book The Lazy Girl's Guide to Being Fit, published by Penguin Random House. She has trained celebrities including Kangana Ranaut, Jacqueline Fernandez, Varun Dhawan, Arjun Kapoor, Aditya Roy Kapur, Nargis Fakhri, Neha Dhupia, Lauren Gottlieb, Shibani Dandekar, Kareena Kapoor Khan, Elli Avram, Bruna Abdullah and Malaika Arora.

She was the official fitness partner to the Femina Miss India Organization (since 2011) and Miss Diva (2013 and 2014). Along with her father, Purohit was the official Pilates coach to the 2014 Mumbai City FC team.
