= Ron Fletcher =

American Pilates instructor

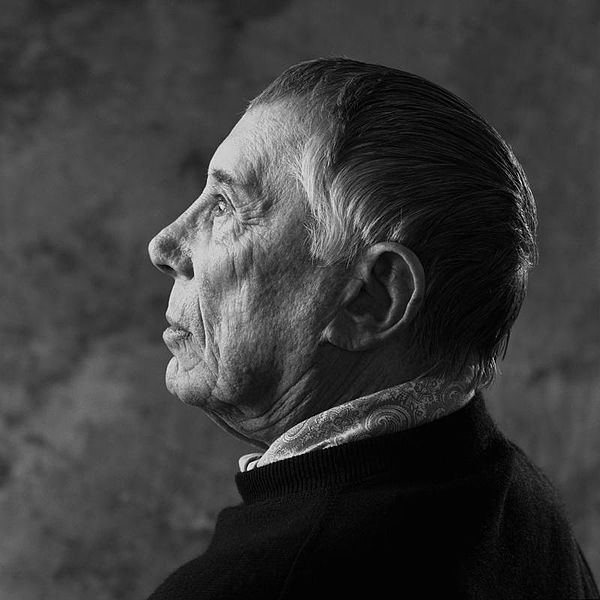
- Born: May 29, 1921; Dogtown, Missouri
- Died: December 6, 2011 (aged 90); Stonewall, Texas
- Occupation: American Pilates Master Teacher

Ron Fletcher (May 29, 1921 – December 6, 2011) was an American Pilates Master Teacher, an author and a Martha Graham dancer. He was also a Broadway stage, network television, cabaret and International Ice Capades choreographer. He is identified as a “Pilates Elder”—a “first-generation teacher” who studied directly under Joseph and Clara Pilates.

Originally referred to Joseph Pilates by fellow dancer for treatment of a chronic knee injury, Fletcher was schooled in the principles of Body Contrology (the name Pilates gave to his fitness and conditioning method) by Joseph and Clara Pilates, with whom he studied in their New York City studio at 939 8th Avenue, on and off from 1948 until one year after Joseph Pilates’ death in 1967.

== Career ==
Following his turn with the Martha Graham Company, Fletcher was cast by Japanese choreographer Yeichi Nimura, alongside Yul Brynner and Mary Martin, in the role of Imperial Attendant (142 performances) in Nimura’s 1946 Broadway and London productions of The Lute Song. Following his professional dance career, Fletcher’s principal avocation, and that for which he became widely known in the entertainment industry, was choreography.

Fletcher worked from the late 1940s until 1971 as a theater, network television, nightclub stage, film and International Ice Capades choreographer. He set dance numbers in New York City for Broadway musicals including 1951’s long-running “Top Banana” (350 performances) as well as for Radio City Music Hall, Roxy Theatre, Latin Quarter and Copacabana stage dance/musical productions. In television’s early days in New York City he worked as both dancer and choreographer for the prime-time television studio production of the “NBC All Star Revue” where his featured dance partner was Tallulah Bankhead. Between 1954 and 1967 Fletcher choreographed shows in Chicago at Chez Paris; in San Francisco at Le Club; and in New Orleans at the Beverly Club. He was also lead choreographer in Paris at the Le Lido for four years where, among other things, he and long-time collaborator, Donn Arden, created “Gala” a show which included skaters on a tank of ice on stage. During that period, Fletcher also choreographed the large-scale Italian production of the 1965 musical “Il Diplomatico” at Teatro Milano as well as the 1954 film version of “Top Banana” and 1961’s comedy “Snow White and the Three Stooges.”

The use of ice skaters in a dance number drew on Fletcher’s experience, continuous from 1954 to 1967, as lead choreographer for the International Ice Capades. During his tenure, featured performers included US figure skating champion Donna Atwood, and world skating champion, Alena Vrzanova, better known as Aja Zanova, who claimed, it was Ron Fletcher who “made me a star.” Each year, after setting choreography for the Ice Capades’ season, Fletcher regularly choreographed shows in Las Vegas at the Desert Inn, Moulin Rouge, Latin Quarter, The Dunes and The Flamingo hotels for the likes of Pearl Bailey, Vic Damone, Shirley Jones, Paula Kelly, Tallulah Bankhead and Jane Kean (with whom he also partnered on stage).

== The Ron Fletcher Studio, Beverly Hills, CA ==
Though Fletcher achieved significant notice in the entertainment industry for his choreography, he is best known in the 21st century for having introduced the Pilates conditioning method, from its home base in New York City, to the American west coast via his Ron Fletcher Studio for Body Contrology, which he opened May 1, 1972 on Rodeo Drive at Wilshire Boulevard in Beverly Hills, California.

Fletcher’s approach to the Pilates method – originally referred to as “The Ron Fletcher Work” or “Fletcher Work”, (today, simply Fletcher Pilates®) – incorporated Graham-based elements of movement and dance into the equipment-centric structure of Joseph Pilates’ original creation. Fletcher was the first to “take the Pilates work vertical.”

Fletcher’s new studio attracted well-known film personalities such as Ali MacGraw, Barbra Streisand, Candice Bergen and Katharine Ross, as well as studio executives, celebrities, dancers and many prominent and influential members of Hollywood society including Betsy Bloomingdale and Nancy Reagan.

Fletcher’s development of his now-trademarked Floorwork and Towelwork - machine-less applications of the Pilates principles that could be performed in a studio, home or workshop setting - was crucial to the spread of the Pilates method.

Writing for The Guardian in June, 2008 (‘Pilates is an Art’), investigative reporter Alice Wignal concluded, “if Fletcher hadn't come up with a way for people to practise the method without needing the equipment, you probably wouldn't have heard of Pilates at all.”

As the original Pilates studio in New York declined in the late 1970s, Fletcher leveraged his high profile and prominent Hollywood clientele to revitalize the discipline. His efforts are widely credited with sustaining public awareness of Pilates during this period.

== Publicity ==
Beginning with features in The Los Angeles Times and Vogue Magazine in 1971, the decade that followed found Fletcher’s studio and his take on the Pilates method featured in Good Housekeeping, Cosmopolitan, Town & Country, Ladies Home Journal, Women’s Wear Daily, Self and Beverly Hills Times Magazine, among others. Ron Fletcher#Archival References

== The Ron Fletcher Program of Study ==
A comprehensive formal education curriculum called The Ron Fletcher Program of Study was established in 2003 for the purpose of training and qualifying new Fletcher Pilates teachers as well as for the accurate preservation of Fletcher’s approach to the Pilates method. Headquartered in Tucson, Arizona, it is based on the apprenticeship-learning model Fletcher experienced as a student and disciple of Joseph and Clara Pilates.

In July 2005, The Ron Fletcher Program of Study was licensed, according to the criteria for post-secondary education, as a school by the State of Arizona.

On December 23, 2008, the US Patent and Trademark Office registered to Ron Fletcher exclusive-use rights to, and trademark protection of, the term “Fletcher Pilates.”

Fletcher died of congestive heart failure in Stonewall, Texas in 2011. He was 90.

== Archival References ==
- WWD (Women’s Wear Daily), Vol. 133, No. 46; September 3. 1976; Kern, Dale “Shaping Up… Inside” Los Angeles, CA, pp 12–13.
- Vogue, April 1975; Weber, Melva “The Benefits of Better Breathing,” pp 128–129.
- Ladies Home Journal, February 1977; Ebert, Alan “Exercise Secrets of a Hollywood Body Doctor” pp 50–52.
- Los Angeles Times, August 14, 1977; Levine, Bettijane “Fitness Guru Centers on Life” (LA Times “View” section) pp 20–22.
- Los Angeles Herald Examiner, March 22, 1976; Kern, Dale “Body Awareness: Key to Shape” p B1.
- Los Angeles Times, Home Magazine (supplement), May 4, 1975; Krier, Beth Ann “A New Kind of Body High” pp 14–16.
- Cosmopolitan, October, 1978; Krantz, Judith “Keeping Fit in Hollywood” pp 259–260.
- Good Housekeeping, October 1978; “Ron Fletcher’s Body Beautiful Exercises” (Book promo, excerpted from “Every Body is Beautiful” by Ron Fletcher and Alan Ebert, J.B. Lippencott Co., 1978), pp 42–48.
- Town & Country, May 1979; Cohen, Bruce David “Beverly Hills Fever” pp 138, cont. 176.
- Good Housekeeping, February 1979 (Book release promotional spread) by Ron Fletcher and Alan Ebert “Every Body Can Be MORE Beautiful” pp 28–34.
- Cosmopolitan, February 1979; Fletcher, Ron with Ebert, Alan “Breathe Right and Wake Up Your Body” pp 82 cont. 106, 138, 150, 158.
- Beverly Hills Magazine, June/July 1978; Sanford, Teddi & Silverstein, Mickie “The Ron Fletcher Contrology Studio” pp 38–40.
- Cosmopolitan, June 1979; Fletcher, Ron with Ebert, Alan “Breathe Right and Wake Up Your Body” (second installment); 4-page spread, pages not identified.
- New York Post, October 31, 1978; Tarbell, Martha “Stretch Your Body as the Stars Do” (Beauty section) p 46.
- The Village Voice, March 3, 1975; Troy, Carol “Maintaining Cher” New York City, pp 118–119.
- WWD (Women’s Wear Daily), February 14, 1975; Cox, Jean “Falling Behind? Body Contrology Helpful” Los Angeles, CA, p 10.
- Self, April 1979; (not attributed) “Fitness to Share” pp 32–33.
- The Body Forum, July 1978; Williams, Jill “Ron Fletcher: The Ponce de Leon of Hollywood” p 16 cont. p 29.
- Coronet, Vol. 12, No. 6, June 1974; “Ron Fletcher Studio: How the Super Bodies Stay That Way” Los Angeles, CA, pp 147–149.
- Los Angeles Times, July 28, 1971; Byrne, Julie “Shaping Up a Body Conscious Society” pp 1–2.
- Vogue, August 1, 1971; (not attributed) “Beauty Checkout: L.A.: A to Z.”
- New York Times, July 24, 1977; Larkin, Robert W. “Turning Ice Skates Into Dance Shoes: Choreography on Ice” pp 15–16.
