= My Ummah =

Studio album by Sami Yusuf
- Released: 6 July 2005
- Recorded: 2003–2005
- Genre: Islamic
- Length: 63:50
- Language: English, Arabic, Farsi, Turkish
- Label: Awakening

Sami Yusuf chronology
Al-Muʽallim (2003)	My Ummah (2005)	Without You (2009)

My Ummah is the second studio album by British singer Sami Yusuf. It was released in two versions, a "music version" and a "percussion version". It is claimed to have sold between five and eight million copies worldwide.

Writing in Arab Media and Society, Christian Pond discussed My Ummah's increasing use of western style instrumentation, western genres such as rap, and the use of music videos similar in style and content to western artists such as Britney Spears, compared to his first album.

== Track list ==
#	Name	Duration
01.	My Ummah (intro)	1:03
02.	My Ummah	3:47
03.	Hasbi Rabbi	4:15
04.	Ya Rasulallah	4:47
05.	Try Not to Cry feat Outlandish	4:36
06.	Muhammad	6:07
07.	Make a Prayer	4:45
08.	Eid Song	4:56
09.	Free	5:09
10.	Munajat (in Arabic)	4:40
11.	Mother (in Arabic)	4:44
12.	Muhammad, Part 2	3:12
13.	We Will Never Submit	2:25
14.	Du'a	4:40
15.	Mother (in English and Turkish)	4:44
16.	Mother (in English and Persian)	4:44
