= Gloria Contreras Roeniger =

Mexican dancer (1934–2015)

Gloria Contreras
- Born: María Gloria Contreras Roeniger; November 15, 1934; Mexico City, Mexico
- Died: November 25, 2015 (aged 81); Mexico City, Mexico
- Occupations: dancer, choreographer, academic

María Gloria Contreras Roeniger, better known as Gloria Contreras (November 15, 1934 – November 25, 2015) was a Mexican dancer, choreographer and academic.

== Studies ==
Contreras started in ballet under Alicia Delgado and Nelsy Dambré in Mexico City from 1946 to 1954, and, after joining the Royal Winnipeg Ballet, in 1955, she studied in the School of American Ballet in New York from 1956 to 1964, where she was taught by Pierre Vladimirov, Felia Doubrovska, Anatole Oboukhoff, Muriel Stuart and George Balanchine. From 1958 to 1965, she was also taught by Carola Trier. During her residence in New York, she established and directed the company "Cielito Lindo".

== Choreographer and Teaching ==
After coming back to Mexico, Contreras taught at the Universidad Nacional Autónoma de México (UNAM). In 1970, she founded and was the director of the Taller Coreográfico de la UNAM (TCUNAM) for 94 seasons. The company performed at the Teatro Arq. Carlos Lazo and Sala Miguel Corrvabuias at UNAM, Mexico City, as well as in New York, Philadelphia, and Baltimore. She directed more than 275 dance works, of which 193 were her own choreographies, using music from chants of the 12th century to contemporary compositions. Contreras was interested in transforming ballet into a popular art form. One of her most notable works is "El mercado".

She opened her company and provided a space to more than 30 choreographers. She created seminars where people of all ages and professions have studied and practiced dance since 1974. Her philosophy of dance was based on the innovation of traditions and the use of technique for communication. Contreras considered the dancer as a fundamental element of the choreography; through the shape, the dancer could communicate the essence of the human being.

Contreras had been a member of the International Dance Council since 2003 and was a member of the Academia de Artes. She was awarded many times, including with Mexico's Premio Nacional de las Artes in 2005.
