= Notuner Gaan =

National march of Bangladesh

Notuner Gan
English: Youth Song
- নতুনের গান
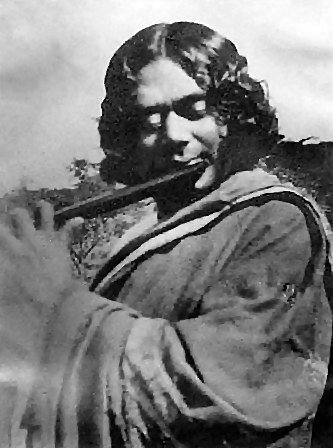
- Kazi Nazrul Islam, composer of the song
- National march of Bangladesh
- Lyrics: Kazi Nazrul Islam, 1928
- Music: Kazi Nazrul Islam, 1928
- Adopted: 13 January 1972

Audio sample
- Instrumental (Metal Sound): file; help

"Notuner Gan", (Note: Bengali: নতুনের গান, romanized: Nôtuner Gan, IPA: [ˈnotuneɾ ˈgan]; lit. 'Youth Song') more popularly known by its incipit "Chol Chol Chol", (Note: Bengali: চল্‌ চল্‌ চল্‌, romanized: chôl chôl chôl, IPA: [tʃɔl tʃɔl tʃɔl]; lit. 'March! March! March!') is the national march of Bangladesh, whose lyrics and tune were written by national poet Kazi Nazrul Islam in 1928. It was first published in the newspaper Shikha (শিখা 'Flame') with the title Notuner Gaan, and was later included in Nazrul's book Sandha (সন্ধ্যা 'Evening'). The Bangladeshi government adopted this song as the national marching song of Bangladesh on 13 January 1972 in its first meeting after the country's independence. The first lines of the song are played at most military ceremonies or functions. The Daily Star has referred to it as the national military song. It was proposed for the national anthem of Bangladesh in 1975. The song ranked 18th in the list of the twenty greatest Bengali songs of all time in a 2006 survey conducted by BBC Bangla.

== Lyrics ==
Bengali original

চল্‌ চল্‌ চল্‌

ঊর্দ্ধ গগনে বাজে মাদল
নিম্নে উতলা ধরণী-তল
অরুণ প্রাতের তরুণ দল
চল্‌ রে চল্‌ রে চল্‌
চল্‌ চল্‌ চল্‌।।

ঊষার দুয়ারে হানি আঘাত
আমরা আনিব রাঙা প্রভাত
আমরা টুটাব তিমির রাত,
বাঁধার বিন্ধ্যা চল।।

নব নবীনের গাহিয়া গান
সজীব করিব মহাশ্মশান
আমরা দানিব নতুন প্রাণ
বাহুতে নবীন বল।।

চলরে নওজোয়ান
শোনরে পাতিয়া কান-
মৃত্যু-তোরণ-দুয়ারে-দুয়ারে
জীবনের আহ্বান
ভাঙ্গরে ভাঙ্গ আগল
চল্‌ রে চল্‌ রে চল্‌
চল্‌ চল্‌ চল্‌।।

ঊর্ধ্ব আদেশ হানিছে বাজ,
শহীদী-ঈদের সেনারা সাজ,
দিকে দিকে চলে কুচ-কাওয়াজ—
খোল রে নিদ-মহল!

কবে সে খেয়ালী বাদশাহী,
সেই সে অতীতে আজো চাহি'
যাস মুসাফির গান গাহি'
ফেলিস অশ্রুজল।

যাক রে তখত-তাউস
জাগ রে জাগ বেহুঁশ।
ডুবিল রে দেখ কত পারস্য
কত রোম গ্রিক রুশ,
জাগিল তা'রা সকল,
জেগে ওঠ হীনবল!
আমরা গড়িব নতুন করিয়া
ধুলায় তাজমহল!

চল্‌ চল্‌ চল্।।

Romanisation

chôl chôl chôl!

Urddhô gôgône baje madôl
Nimne utôla dhôrôṇi-tôl
Ôruṇ prater tôruṇ dôl
chôlre chôlre chôl
chôl chôl chôl!

Uṣar duẇare hani aghat
Amra anib raṅa prôbhat
Amra ṭuṭab timir rat
Bãdhar bindhya chôl.

Nôb nôbiner gahiẏa gan
Sôjib kôrib môhaśôśman
Amra danib nôtun praṇ
Bahute nôbin bôl.

chôlre nôojoẇan,
Śonre patiẏa kan-
Mṛtyu-tôroṇ-duẇare-duẇare
Jibôner ahban
Bhaṅgre bhaṅg agôl
chôlre chôlre chôl
chôl chôl chôl!

Urddhô adeś haniche baj
Śôhidi-Ider senara saj
Dike dike chôle kuc-kaoẇaj –
Kholre nid-môhôl!

Kôbe se kheẏali badśahi
Sei se otite ajo cahi
Yas musaphir gan gahi
Phelis ôśrujôl!

Yakre takht-taus
Jagre jag behũś
Ḍubilre dekh kot parôsyô
Kôt rom grik ruś
Jagil ta'ra sôkôl
Jege oṭh hinbôl!
Amra gôṛib nôtun kôriẏa
Dhulaẏ tajmôhôl!

chôl chôl chôl!

English translation

March, March, March!

By a drum beat to a heavenly height
From earth beneath and soil's blight
Youth rise in the dawn's light,
Left, now, now, right!
March, March, March!

Through dawn's door, a shattering blow
We will bring daybreak, scarlet in glow;
We will destroy the gloom of the night
And hindering mountain height.

The youngest of young, a song will sing;
From buried bones we raise the living;
We are the ones, new life will bring
With a new arm of might.

Soldier, take your stand,
A heartening ear now bend;
Doors that lead to death's portal,
A call to life extend!
Break all doors tight
and march, left and right!
March, March, March!

On high the cry to charge is made,
the martyr's captain for battle's arrayed;
In every direction, a marching parade
roushing the drowsy from night.

When did that ancient kingdom vanish away?
We want that ancient age today.
The troubadours song, we will sing and play.
weep with all your might!

Shed now, the pompous throne awaken,
O you heedless drone!
See how the Persian rule sank down,
and Russia and Greece and Rome.
They all awoke to fight;
You feeble, now ignite!
From the dust, we will build anew
the Taj Mahal! Unite!
Left, right! Left, right!
March, March, March!

== See also ==
- "Amar Shonar Bangla" – the national anthem of Bangladesh
- "O Mon Romzaner Oi Rozar Sheshe" – a Bengali Eid ul Fitr song
- "Banglar Mati Banglar Jol" – the state anthem of West Bengal, India
