= Tribhuboner Priyo Muhammad =

"Tribhubôner Priyô Muhammad"
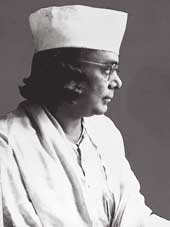
- Kazi Nazrul Islam

Song by Abbasuddin Ahmed
- Published: 1935
- Released: 1935
- Genre: Nazrul Geeti, Ghazal
- Songwriter: Kazi Nazrul Islam

Music video
- "Tribhubôner Priyô Muhammad" by Kalarab on YouTube

"Tribhubôner Priyô Muhammad" (Bengali: ত্রিভুবনের প্রিয় মুহাম্মদ, lit. 'Muhammad, the beloved of tri-dimension') is a nasheed or ghazal composed by the Kazi Nazrul Islam, celebrating the birth of Muhammad. The ghazal was composed in 1935, in the melody of "Kâtibim", a traditional Turkish folk music. Nazrul's first song in the melody of Kâtibim was "Shukno Patar Nupur Paye", which was recorded by Harimati Devi in 1933. Tribhuboner Priyo Muhammad came out two years later in 1935 in the same melody, featuring the voice of Nazrul's disciple and connoisseur Abbasuddin Ahmed.

== Background of the melody ==
The melody of Tribhubôner Priyô Muhammad was considered to be inspired from Arabic folk music once. According to the researcher Asadul Haque in his article titled "Successful application of Arabic melody in Bengali songs by composer Nazrul" (সঙ্গীতজ্ঞ নজরুলের বাংলা গানে আরবি সুরের সুষ্ঠু প্রয়োগ) in published the Dainik Ittefaq, he heard the same melody of a Turkish song while staying at Ankara, Turkey In 1965. He became doubted about the claimed Arabic origin of that melody and went out for research. When he went to Syria in an official trip, he asked a local old person who replied that it was "a thousand-year-old melody" of the Syrian song "Ya Banat Iskandaria" (Arabic: يا بنات اسكندريّة) meaning "Oh Girls of Alexandria", the Turkish version of which is known as 'Kâtibim'. The song is about a girl and her clerk while visiting Üsküdar.

No clear reference exists about where Nazrul got the melody of this nasheed or from whom he learned it. Some researchers believe that Nazrul got the melody of Kâtibim from the soldiers of the Bengal Regiment, who were sent to Iraq for training against the German forces in 1914 at the beginning of the World War I.

== See also ==
- Nazrul Geeti
- O Mon Romzaner Oi Rozar Sheshe
- Kâtibim
