= Salaam (album) =

Studio album by Sami Yusuf
- Released: December 22, 2012
- Recorded: 2009–2012
- Genre: Spiritique
- Length: 62:00
- Label: ETM International
- Producer: Sami Yusuf

Sami Yusuf chronology
| Wherever You Are (2010) | Salaam (2012) |

Salaam is the fifth studio album by Sami Yusuf, that was released on December 22, 2012. The physical version was released on December 22, while the digital version was released on December 24. South East Asia and Middle East and North Africa (MENA) received the album before it was released worldwide. He described the album as a musical progression from 2010's Wherever You Are in celebrating "outward multiciplity and inward unity" with an emphasis on peace between people regardless of differences.

The album includes a number of songs celebrating Yusuf's Islamic faith. The international release went platinum in South-East Asia and was on best-selling lists in the Middle East and North Africa. The album was released in a special edition for Turkey, including five songs re-recorded by Yusuf in Turkish.

== Music videos ==
- Hear Your Call
- I'm Your Hope
- Forgotten Promises
- It's A Game
- Wherever You Are (Acoustic - Arabic version)
- All I Need

== Track listing ==
| No. | Title | Length |
|---|---|---|
| 1. | "Happiness" | 03:20 |
| 2. | "Salaam (song)" | 04:42 |
| 3. | "Smile" | 03:57 |
| 4. | "The Source" | 03:47 |
| 5. | "Dryer Land" | 04:29 |
| 6. | "It's A Game" | 03:37 |
| 7. | "To Guide You Home" | 03:41 |
| 8. | "Forgotten Promises" | 04:15 |
| 9. | "Ala Bi Dikhrika" | 03:27 |
| 10. | "I'm Your Hope" | 02:45 |
| 11. | "All I Need" | 03:38 |
| 12. | "Hear Your Call" | 04:29 |
| 13. | "Wherever You Are (Acoustic - Arabic) Bonus" | 03:54 |
| 14. | "Without You (Acoustic - Arabic) Bonus" | 04:51 |
| 15. | "To Guide You Home (Instrumental) Bonus" | 02:34 |
| 16. | "Dryer Land (Feat. Ustadh Babak Radmanesh) Bonus" | 04:29 |
| Total length: | | 62:00 |
