= Barakah (album) =

Studio album by Sami Yusuf
- Released: February 1, 2016
- Studio: Andante Records
- Genre: Spiritique
- Length: 64:24
- Label: Andante Records

Sami Yusuf chronology
1001 Inventions and the World of Ibn Al-Haytham (2015)	Barakah (2016)

Barakah is a 2016 studio album by British singer-songwriter Sami Yusuf. It was released on 1 February 2016 on Andante Records.

It is also marketed as the first of a series of recordings as Spiritique Collection (Vol. 1).

Yusuf also released accompanying music videos for a number of the tracks, including Inna Fil Jannati, Taha, Hamziyya, Fiyyashiyya and Ben Yürürüm Yane Yane.

== Track listing ==
No.	Title	Length
1.	"The Parties"	02:59
2.	"Inna Fil Jannati"	03:14
3.	"Hamziyya"	04:43
4.	"Ya Rasul Allah, Pt. 1"	06:06
5.	"Ya Rasul Allah, Pt. 2"	02:42
6.	"Fiyyashiyya"	04:59
7.	"Ya Nabi"	04:34
8.	"Ben Yürürüm Yane Yane"	06:52
9.	"Araftul Hawa"	06:03
10.	"Ya Hayyu Ya Qayyum"	03:55
11.	"Taha"	04:26
12.	"Asheqan"	07:43
13.	"Barakah"	04:29
14.	"Iron"	01:59
