= Sami Yusuf =

Iranian-British musician (born 1980)

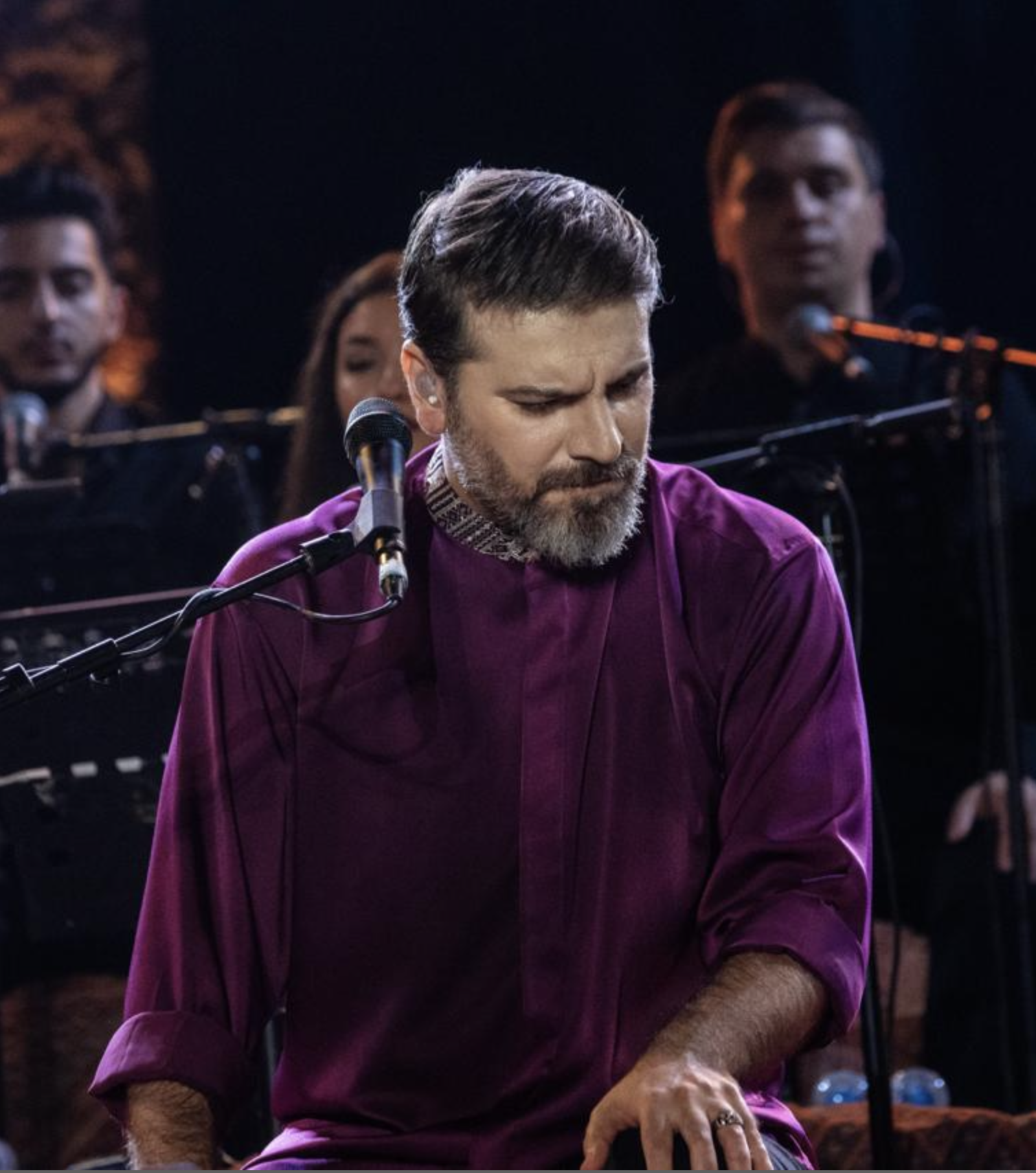
- Sami Yusuf in 2026

Background information
- Born: 21 July 1980 (age 46); Tehran, Iran
- Genres: World music traditions, Classical crossover
- Occupations: Composer; Musician; Humanitarian
- Instruments: Vocals; Piano; Violin; Oud; Tar; Tonbak
- Years active: 2003–present
- Labels: Andante; ETM; Sony; Warner
- Publisher: Fairwood
- Website: samiyusuf.art

Sami Yusuf (born 21 July 1980) is a British composer, multi-instrumentalist and vocalist. He gained international attention with the release of his debut album, Al-Muʽallim, in 2003. As of 2026, he has released eight studio albums, five live albums and one compilation album. His studio albums were mostly released by Andante Records. He has sold over 45 million albums as of 2026.

Besides English, Yusuf has performed in Arabic, Kurdish, Azerbaijani, Persian, Turkish, Punjabi, and Urdu. In recognition of his philanthropy, in 2014, the United Nations appointed Yusuf a Global Ambassador for the World Food Programme.

In 2015, the UN created World Interfaith Harmony Week and appointed Yusuf an Elite Ambassador. He composed and performed the anthem for the opening event, ‘The Gift of Love’.

== Early life ==
Sami Yusuf was born on 21 July 1980 in Tehran to Azerbaijani parents. His grandparents are from Baku, Azerbaijan, from which they left for Iran when it was captured by the Bolsheviks following World War I. Yusuf and his parents arrived in Ealing, West London, in the early 1980s. From an early age, Yusuf showed great interest in music. He was influenced by the wide range of musical genres available to him in London, especially Western classical music and Middle Eastern music. He learned the piano and violin as well as traditional instruments including the oud, tar, and tonbak. In 2003, although considering pursuing a career in law, he produced and released his first album. It quickly became an international success and launched Yusuf's professional music career. Yusuf studied music as a composition student at Salford University in north-west England.

== Music career ==
=== 2003–2009 ===
In 2003, Yusuf released his debut album, Al-Muʽallim, an album that he produced, wrote, and performed. Its feature song, Al-Mu'allim, became a hit in the Middle East, North Africa, and South-East Asia, topping the charts in Egypt and Turkey for twelve consecutive weeks, selling millions of copies worldwide and reaching a diverse audience. The last track of the album, Supplication, was used in the Golden-Globe award-nominated film, The Kite Runner.

Yusuf garnered increased worldwide recognition following the release of his second album, My Ummah, in 2005. The album, using both Eastern and Western sounds, utilised wide-ranging musical instrumentation. Considered a breakthrough album, it sold over four million copies globally and was well received, particularly by young people, who identified closely with the themes of Yusuf's lyrics.

Yusuf left Awakening Records following a controversy over Without You, an album that was released without his knowledge or consent.

=== 2010–2013 ===
Wherever You Are, Yusuf's third official album, was released in March 2010. Rolling Stone called the album "beautifully produced". With its release, Yusuf welcomed what he termed a "new chapter" in his professional career and music.

Yusuf's fourth album, Salaam, was released in December 2012. Within four months of its launch it achieved platinum status in Southeast Asia and was the best-selling album in the Middle East and North Africa. The album includes the song "Hear Your Call," composed by Yusuf to call attention to the situation of people who are affected by natural disasters.

=== 2014–2018 ===
The Centre was released in 2014 and is a collection of 13 songs in which Yusuf hopes his listeners will find inspiration to seek their individual spiritual centres. It is a new sound that has multicultural influences, employing traditional as well as contemporary Middle Eastern, North African, and European poetry, instrumentation, and melodies.

Yusuf's sixth album, Songs of the Way, was released in January 2015. All lyrics are by the noted philosopher Seyyed Hossein Nasr and are from his books of poetry, Poems of the Way and The Pilgrimage of Life. Except for two tracks in Persian and Arabic, the songs are in English.

Barakah, Yusuf's seventh album, was released in February 2016 by Andante Records. He said that he spent over a year researching traditional music and poetry in order to create the pieces. Yusuf said it is his musical response to the increasing chaos and noise of today's world. The song "Mast Qalandar" from Barakah reached #1 on World Music charts on iTunes and BBC Music.

According to Yusuf, the new album aims "to respond to the growing extremism in our world with a call for a return to harmony and balance."

Following its release, Yusuf performed at the Dubai Opera in 2016 and released the concert as a live album.

In 2018, Yusuf released his EP, SAMi, as a side project that grew out of his desire to explore his British musical roots. The song collection, with its accessible sounds and direct lyricism, finds Yusuf's exploring the western sounds emanating from his childhood growing up in London.

SAMi has sold well and topped a number of iTunes charts since its release.

=== 2019 - Present ===
In 2019, Yusuf composed, arranged and directed Azerbaijan: A Timeless Presence for the Opening Ceremony of the 43rd Session of the UNESCO World Heritage Committee in Baku, Azerbaijan. The works, performed by an ensemble of 57 musicians, showcase the music and poetry traditions of Azerbaijan. It was released as a live album.

Yusuf performed for the second time at the Fes Festival of World Sacred Music in 2019. The concert came out as Live at the Fes Festival of World Sacred Music and the 16-track album features a Moroccan vocal group and new compositions as well as new arrangements of previously released works.

In 2020, during lockdown, Yusuf gave an online concert from his studio at home. He was joined by musicians in the UK and Turkey. It was released as a live album.

In 2020, Yusuf released a single that he had composed for what had been scheduled to be the first of his When Paths Meet concert series in Amsterdam. ‘ONE’ featured 29 musicians performing in separate studios and was a collaboration between The Sami Yusuf Ensemble, Cappella Amsterdam, and The Amsterdam Andalusian Orchestra.

In 2021, Yusuf performed at the Dubai EXPO. Released in 2022 as a live album, Beyond the Stars comprises eight new compositions and new arrangements of previous releases. The concert was performed entirely on traditional instruments.

In 2022, Yusuf composed, arranged and directed the first concert of the When Paths Meet series. It was performed at the Royal Concertgebouw in Amsterdam as part of the Holland Festival. Sami Yusuf and his ensemble were joined by Cappella Amsterdam and The Amsterdam Andalusian Orchestra. Released in 2023 as a live album, When Paths Meet (Vol. 1), it draws from world music traditions including European [[choral music]], North African mawwals, Middle Eastern maqams, and the melodies of the Chinese Erhu. The lyrics are from mystical poets Hildegard of Bingen, al-Shushtari, and Fuzuli.

In 2023, the second concert of Yusuf’s When Paths Meet series was held on two nights at the Philharmonie de Paris. Yusuf composed and arranged music for The Sami Yusuf Ensemble, The Scoring Orchestra of Paris, The Métaboles, and specialist musicians and soloists. The lyrics featured French mystical poetry of Thérèse de Lisieux. The compositions incorporated Baroque music including Yusuf’s ‘Meditations on a Musette by Couperin’. The album When Paths Meet (Vol. 2) was released in 2024.

In 2024, Yusuf headlined the Fes Festival of World Sacred Music in Morocco and was accompanied by musicians from Spain, France, Morocco and th Middle East. The concert drew record crowds. His new compositions and arrangements incorporated elements from flamenco music and Spanish poetry of San Juan de la Cruz. He was accompanied by an ensemble of 20 musicians from Spain, Morocco, Turkey, the UK, and Azerbaijan.

In 2024, Yusuf headlined the inaugural Tanweer Festival, held over three days (22–24 November) in the Mleiha Desert, Sharjah — a site with over 200,000 years of human history. Themed "Timeless Echoes of Love and Light" and inspired by the legacy of Jalal al-Din Rumi, the festival brought together more than 100 musicians and poets from over 15 nations across 29 performances. Yusuf's set wove Arabic music and poetry together with the sound of flamenco.

In 2025, Yusuf performed Ecstasy: Between Two Seas at Festival Park, Yenikapı, Istanbul, on August 23, before a crowd reported at 20,000 sold tickets. The concert gave the first live performances of material from his forthcoming album Ecstasy — not yet released at the time — alongside new arrangements of earlier works. The programme drew on Turkish musical and poetic heritage, including the verses of Yunus Emre and Nesimi (Nasimi), interwoven with traditional Turkish modes. Part of the proceeds were donated to humanitarian relief efforts in Gaza.

In 2025, Yusuf returned to Jordan after nearly two decades to perform at the 2,000-year-old Roman Theatre in Amman on October 11, in collaboration with the Jordan Festivals Friends Association. He conducted his ensemble alongside the Amman Chamber Orchestra and an international choir, with musician counts reported at "more than 50." The programme featured previews of the still-unreleased Ecstasy alongside new arrangements of earlier works.

In 2025, Yusuf shared the stage with Pakistani singer Atif Aslam at Etihad Arena, Yas Island, Abu Dhabi, on November 7, for Symphony of Stars: The Soulful Experience, presented by Blu Blood. This was their first performance together; the 2024 edition of the series had paired Aslam with Abida Parveen. This was a side-by-side pairing concert built around new acoustic arrangements — including reinterpretations of Aslam's own songs — rather than a Yusuf-composed programme in the mould of Amman or Istanbul.

In 2026, Yusuf released his studio album Ecstasy on March 27, via Andante Records — described in its official trailer as ten years in the making, shaped by journeys across continents. The album brings together award-winning collaborators: two-time Academy Award and Grammy winner A.R. Rahman features on the title track "Ecstasy," while the closing choral piece "Being" features VOCES8, the British vocal ensemble named 2026 Opus Klassik choral album of the year for a separate release and Grammy-nominated in 2023 for "The Lost Birds." The album's nine tracks also include "Voices of the Earth," "Between Sea and Sky," "Lifting the Veil," "Eterna" (with Israel Moro), "The Cup of Love" (with Guo Gan), "In That Ocean" (with Homayoun Shajarian), and "Amada" (with Antonio Rey).

In 2026, Yusuf returned to the 29th Fes Festival of World Sacred Music for his fourth appearance, giving two concerts at Bab Al Makina: a solo performance on Saturday, June 6, and a closing-night appearance on Sunday, June 7, titled "La Nuit du Samaa – De Fès à Konya," sharing the stage with the Konya Metropolitan Sufi Music Ensemble, custodians of the Mevlevi whirling-dervish tradition recognised on UNESCO's intangible heritage list. He was joined by members of the Fons Sophiae Collective, Nabyla Maan, Ismail Boujia, and Chinese erhu player Guo Gan, performing material from his newly released album Ecstasy.

In 2026, Yusuf made his debut appearance at the International Festival of Carthage on August 1, on the 11th night of the festival's 60th-anniversary edition — his first performance in Tunisia since a 2012 concert in Radès. He performed with the Fons Sophiae Collective, joined by soloists including Nabyla Maan. The set drew on his newly released album Ecstasy and included "Lifting the Veil," "Madad," a new arrangement of an al-Hallaj poem, and "We Love Life" — a duet with Maan dedicated to the people of Gaza, drawing on Mahmoud Darwish's verse.

== Notable tours and concert performances ==
Playing in Farum Arena, Denmark, Grugahalle in Germany, and De Doelen in the Netherlands, Yusuf introduced his forthcoming album, Wherever You Are. He performed in Azerbaijan for the first time in 2006, for the second time in 2015 (14–15 March), and 22 March 2017 in Heydar Aliyev Palace in Baku, 250,000 people attended his performance in Taksim Square in Istanbul to see Yusuf perform in 2013. Yusuf has played across four continents, packing venues such as Wembley Arena in London, Shrine Auditorium in Los Angeles ,The Velodrome in Cape Town, South Africa and the Concertgebouw in Amsterdam (with the Amsterdam Andalusian Orchestra). He sings in English, Arabic, Turkish, Persian, Azerbaijani, Malay and Urdu and is backed by a range of both classical and ethnic instruments. Yusuf also performed in Washington, D.C.

Yusuf performed in Dubai for the first time in December 2016. He premiered the song "Glorification", inspired by the poetry of His Highness Shaikh Mohammad Bin Rashid Al Maktoum, Vice-President and Prime Minister of the UAE and Ruler of Dubai.

== Humanitarian work ==
Since early in his professional career, Yusuf has participated in humanitarian initiatives by performing benefit concerts, releasing charity singles, and acting on behalf of organisations to relieve suffering and poverty. In response to the 2010 Pakistan floods that wreaked havoc in the country and affected 20 million lives in the summer of 2010, he promptly released a charity single entitled "Hear Your Call", performed in English and Urdu, to raise funds for the displaced Pakistanis in a joint-effort with the UN-sponsored charity organisation Save the Children.

In 2014, he was appointed "UN Global Ambassador" for the World Food Programme.

== Personal life ==
Sami spoke of his background as "diverse" and cited this as evidence for his "tendency to bring people together". He is a Sunni Muslim.

Sami Yusuf married in c. 2005. His wife is of German origin and had converted to Islam before she met Yusuf.

== Honors and awards ==
In 2009, Yusuf was awarded an honorary Doctor of Letters in recognition of his "extraordinary contributions to the field of music" by Roehampton University, London. Silatech appointed him as their first Global Ambassador in the same year, later joining Ahmad Al Shugairi in the same position.

Widely regarded as the highest profile Muslim musician in the UK, Yusuf has appeared each year since 2010 on the list of the "World's 500 Most Influential Muslims".

In 2014, the United Nations appointed him Global Ambassador Against Hunger, and in 2015 the UN appointed him as an "Elite Ambassador" for the UN World Interfaith Harmony Week.

In 2016, Yusuf received a Recognition Award for his contributions to promoting the message of peace and tolerance as part of the Mohammed bin Rashid Al Maktoum World Peace Initiative.

In 2019, Yusuf received an honorary diploma from the First Vice-President of Azerbaijan for his contributions to promote Azerbaijani music and culture.

=== In the media ===
- "Islam's Biggest Rock Star" – Time magazine (2006)
- "Biggest Star in the Middle East" – The Guardian (2006)
- "King of Islamic Pop" – Al Jazeera (2007)
- IOL Star of 2009 (2009)
- BBC's 30 More Famous Britons (2009)

== Discography ==
=== Studio albums ===
Album	Year
Al-Muʽallim	2003
My Ummah	2005
Wherever You Are	2010
Salaam	2012
The Centre	2014
Songs of the Way, Vol. 1	2015
Barakah	2016
Ecstasy	2026

=== Live albums ===
Album	Year
Live At the Katara Amphitheatre	2015
Live in Concert 2015	2015
Live in London 2016	2016
Live at the Dubai Opera	2016
Live in Concert – EP	2019
Live in new Delhi – EP	2019
Azerbaijan: A Timeless Presence (Live)	2019
Live at the Fes Festival of World Sacred Music	2019
The House Concert	2020
Beyond the Stars (Live)	2022
ONE: When Paths Meet	2023
L'Amour: When Paths Meet	2024
Alma: When Paths Meet	2024

=== Compilation albums ===
Album	Year
The Sapiential Album, Vol. 1	2020
O Lovers: Music from the Unseen World	2020

=== Singles ===
Album	Year
Forgotten Promises	2011
The Source	2011
Hope Survives	2014
Mast Qalandar	2016
Al Faqir	2018
Ya Hayyu Ya Qayyum	2019
Khorasan (Instrumental)	2019
Oblivion	2019
Light upon light	2019
The 99 Names	2020
One	2020
