= O Mon Romzaner Oi Rozar Sheshe =

Bengali Eid-ul-Fitr song

"O Mon Romzaner Oi Rozar Sheshe Elo Khushir Id"
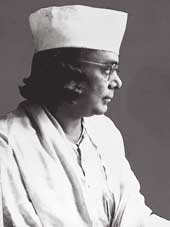
- Kazi Nazrul Islam, composer of the song

Song
- Language: Bengali
- English title: O, at the End of the Fasting of Ramadan Came the Joyous Eid
- Published: 1931
- Genre: Nazrul Geeti
- Songwriter: Kazi Nazrul Islam

"O Mon Romzaner Oi Rozar Sheshe" (Bengali: ও মন রমজানের ঐ রোজার শেষে, pronounced [oː mon ˈrɔmd͡ʒaneɾ oi̯ ˈrod͡ʒaɾ ˈʃeʃeˑ]) is a popular Bengali Eid-ul-Fitr song, written by Kazi Nazrul Islam, the national poet of Bangladesh. The song was written and composed in 1931 at the request of Nazrul's disciple, Abbasuddin Ahmed. The song is written on the end of the period of fasting and the Bengali celebration of Eid-ul-Fitr. The song remains one of the most popular Bengali song of all time and is a common tune heard in Bangladeshi households. This was regarded by his contemporaries as a significant achievement, as Bengali Muslims had been strongly averse to devotional music.

== First recording ==
In 1931, four days after the song was written, it was first recorded in the voice of the artist Abbasuddin Ahmed. The song was set to the Pilu as its raga and keherwa for its tala. Two months after the recording, the record was released just before Eid al-Fitr. Gramophone Company released this record. The other song on the record was the poet's "Islamer Oi Souda Loye Elo Navin Sodagar, Bodnasin Aay, Aay Gunahgar Notun Kore Soda Kor." The record number of His Masters Company was N-4111. The song was released in February 1932.

At the time of the recording the song, Abbasuddin Ahmed was 23 years old and had not yet made a proper debut as a folk singer. This song established him as a popular folk singer. In the following years, Ahmed gained popularity by singing the song at various events. The song became equally popular in India and Bangladesh.

== Lyrics ==
The lyrics of the song are presented here in the same spelling it was published in, in 1931. Some words of old orthography may not conform to modern Bengali orthography.

O Mon Romzaner Oi Rozar Sheshe
Audio

Bengali original

ও মন রমজানের ঐ রোজার শেষে এলো খুশির ঈদ
তুই আপনাকে আজ বিলিয়ে দে শোন আসমানী তাগিদ।
তোর সোনা-দানা বালাখানা সব রাহে লিল্লাহ
দে যাকাত মুর্দা মুসলিমের আজ ভাঙাইতে নিঁদ
ও মন রমজানের ঐ রোজার শেষে এলো খুশির ঈদ।

আজ পড়বি ঈদের নামাজ রে মন সেই সে ঈদগাহে
যে ময়দানে সব গাজী মুসলিম হয়েছে শহীদ।
ও মন রমজানের ঐ রোজার শেষে এলো খুশির ঈদ।

আজ ভুলে যা তোর দোস্ত-দুশমন হাত মেলাও হাতে
তোর প্রেম দিয়ে কর বিশ্ব নিখিল ইসলামে মুরিদ।
ও মন রমজানের ঐ রোজার শেষে এলো খুশির ঈদ।

যারা জীবন ভরে রাখছে রোজা নিত্য উপবাসী
সেই গরীব ইয়াতীম মিসকিনে দে যা কিছু মুফিদ
ও মন রমজানের ঐ রোজার শেষে এলো খুশির ঈদ।
আপনাকে আজ বিলিয়ে দে শোন আসমানী তাগিদ।

ঢাল হৃদয়ের তশতরীতে শিরনি তৌহিদের
তোর দাওয়াত কবুল করবেন হজরত হয় মনে উম্মীদ।
ও মন রমজানের ঐ রোজার শেষে এলো খুশির ঈদ।

তোরে মারল' ছুঁড়ে জীবন জুড়ে ইট পাথর যারা
সেই পাথর দিয়ে তোলরে গড়ে প্রেমেরই মসজিদ।
ও মন রমজানের ঐ রোজার শেষে এলো খুশির ঈদ
আপনাকে আজ বিলিয়ে দে শোন আসমানী তাগিদ।

Romanisation of Bengali

O mon romzaner oi rozar sheshe elo khushir Id,
Tui apnake aj biliye de, shon asmani tagid.
Tor shona-dana, balakhana shob rahe Lillah
De zakat, murda musolimer aj bhangaite nĩd,
O mon romzaner oi rozar sheshe elo khushir Id.

Aj poṛbi ider namaj re mon shei she idgahe,
Je moydane shob gaji musolim hoyche shohid.
O mon romzaner oi rozar sheshe elo khushir Id.

Aj bhule ja tor dosto-dushmon, hat melao hate,
Tor prem diye kor bishbo nikhil islame murid.
O mon romzaner oi rozar sheshe elo khushir Id.

Jara jibon bhore rakhche roza, nitto upobashi,
Shei gorib iyatim miskine de ja kichu mufid,
O mon romzaner oi rozar sheshe elo khushir Id.
Apnake aj biliye de shon asmani tagid.

Ḍhal hridoyer toshtorite shironi touhider,
Tor dawat kobul korben hojrot hoy mone ummid.
O mon romzaner oi rozar sheshe elo khushir Id.

Tore marol chũṛe jibon juṛe iṭ pathor jara,
Shei pathor diye tolare gaṛe premerai mosjid.
O mon romzaner oi rozar sheshe elo khushir Id,
Apnake aj biliye de shon asmani tagid.

English translation

O heart, happy Eid came at the end of that Ramadan fast,
Give yourself away today, listen to the heavenly exhortation.
Your gold-beads, bracelets, all the way to Lillah,
Give Zakat, to wake up the dead Muslim today,
O mind, happy Eid came at the end of that Ramadan fast.

Today I will read Eid prayers, o my heart, in that Eidgah,
The ground on which all Ghazi Muslims have been martyred.
O heart, happy Eid came at the end of that Ramadan fast.

Forget what your friend and foe do today, shake hands,
With your love, the world is a disciple of worldwide Islam.
O heart, happy Eid came at the end of that Ramadan fast.

Those who are full of life, fasting, constantly fasting,
Give to the poor orphan miskin, whatever is beneficial,
O heart, happy Eid came at the end of that Ramadan fast,
Give yourself away today, listen to the heavenly exhortation.

Pour the sweetness of Tawhid in the saucer of the heart,
The honourable will accept your invitation, I hope.
O mind, happy Eid came at the end of that Ramadan fast.

Those who threw bricks and stones at you all their lives,
Build a mosque of love with that stone.
O heart, happy Eid came at the end of that Ramadan fast,
Give yourself away today, listen to the heavenly exhortation.

== See also ==
- Tribhuboner Priyo Muhammad
