= Namrata Mohanty =

Indian singer

Namrata Mohanty is an Odia singer based in Cuttack, Odisha, India. She is a B-High grade singer of All India Radio (AIR), Cuttack since 1983. She is a science graduate from Brahmapur University. She was undergoing her Masters degree, but discontinued her studies because of illness.

== Career ==
Mohanty received training in Hindustani classical vocal from musicians like Dhananjay Satapathy, A. Maheswar Rao and Shantanu Das. Her first solo album of Oriya modern songs ‘Janhare Tolide Ghara’ was released in 2009. The album had lyrics by Bijaya Malla, Nizam and Arun Mantri, and composer Om Prakash Mohanty had set them to tune.

Her second solo Oriya album ‘Dipa Jale Dipa Libhe’ was released in 2010. She recovered and rendered some lost and unpublished lyrics written by the legendary songwriter-singer-composer of Odisha, Akshaya Mohanty. Music director Om Prakash Mohanty used befitting compositions for the lost lyrics.

In 2014, she released two more solo albums simultaneously named 'Chhuti' and 'Ninad'. 'Chhuti' was a collection of twelve modern peppy Oriya songs written by lyricist Bijaya Malla and composed by Om Prakash Mohanty. ‘Ninad’ is a collection of eight traditional Hindi bhajans written by saint-poets like Tulsidas, Surdas, Meera Bai, Kabir and Lalit Kishori. Veteran composer A. Maheswar Rao has composed the music. The two albums reflect her versatility in singing traditional bhajans as well as modern songs. While her Hindi devotional album ‘Ninad’ reached a wider audience all over the country, ‘Chhuti’ appealed to the young generation of Odisha.

She has sung the Oriya translations of some of the most popular songs of Bengali poet and musician Kazi Nazrul Islam (1899–1976), which is popularly known as Nazrul Geeti. Veteran lyricist and composer, Swaroop Naik has translated twelve selected songs of Nazrul into Oriya and noted music arranger and designer Nityashree Ranjan has supervised the dubbing sessions.

== Discography ==
| Year | Song | Album | Music director |
|---|---|---|---|
| 2014 | "Kichhi Kahibi Kahibi" | Chhuti | Om Prakash Mohanty |
| 2014 | "Tume Janichha" | Chhuti | Om Prakash Mohanty |
| 2014 | "Jyotsnare Bhijibhiji" | Chhuti | Om Prakash Mohanty |
| 2014 | "Ki Dinare" | Chhuti | Om Prakash Mohanty |
| 2014 | "Kie Se Dhire Dhire" | Chhuti | Om Prakash Mohanty |
| 2014 | "Asadha Asichhi" | Chhuti | Om Prakash Mohanty |
| 2014 | "Eitthi Khusi" | Chhuti | Om Prakash Mohanty |
| 2014 | "Tu Chandrama" | Chhuti | Om Prakash Mohanty |
| 2014 | "Dheu Ase" | Chhuti | Om Prakash Mohanty |
| 2014 | "Jemiti Pachhe" | Chhuti | Om Prakash Mohanty |
| 2014 | "Chham Chham" | Chhuti | Om Prakash Mohanty |
| 2014 | "Dina Sabu" | Chhuti | Om Prakash Mohanty |
| 2014 | "Bhaja Mana Ramacharana Sukhadayi" | Ninad | A. Maheswar Rao |
| 2014 | "Nishidina Barasata Nain Hamare" | Ninad | A. Maheswar Rao |
| 2014 | "Soi Rasana Jo Harigun Gawei" | Ninad | A. Maheswar Rao |
| 2014 | "Mein Girdhar Ke Ghar Jaaon" | Ninad | A. Maheswar Rao |
| 2014 | "Ya Bidhi Manko Lagawei" | Ninad | A. Maheswar Rao |
| 2014 | "Tanaki Dhanaki Kaun Badai" | Ninad | A. Maheswar Rao |
| 2014 | "Hariko Lalita Badana Niharu" | Ninad | A. Maheswar Rao |
| 2014 | "Lataka Lataka Manamohana Aawan" | Ninad | A. Maheswar Rao |
