= Romana Kryzanowska =

American Pilates instructor (1923–2013)

- Born: 30 June 1923; Farmington, Michigan, U.S.
- Died: 30 August 2013 (aged 90); New York City, U.S.

Romana Kryzanowska (June 30, 1923 – August 30, 2013) was an American Pilates instructor who started as a student of Joseph Pilates and his wife Clara at their studio on Eighth Avenue in New York. After the death of Joseph Pilates in 1967, Clara Pilates continued the studio for a few more years, and in 1970 Romana Kryzanowska became the director of what was by that time called "The Pilates Studio."

== Biography ==
Romana Kryzanowska was born in Farmington, Michigan on June 30, 1923. She was the only child of Roman Kryzanowsky and Sari Pickett Kryzanowsky. Her father, Roman was an accomplished artist in Detroit, in the 1920s. Some of his artwork is in storage at the Detroit Institute of Arts. Her mother, Sari went on to continue painting and displaying her own artwork after Roman died in 1929.

Romana studied ballet as a child. At age 16, while studying at George Balanchine’s School of American Ballet, she suffered an ankle injury, and was taken by Balanchine to Joseph Pilates to see if exercise rather than an operation would resolve the problem. The exercises were a success, and she continued to study with Pilates. Romana Kryzanowska became Pilates' protégée, Before I knew it", she said, "I was named a helper, which meant I didn’t have to pay anymore."

On July 11, 1944, she married Pablo Mejia at Saint Patrick's Cathedral. The couple moved to Peru, where she danced and taught the Pilates technique. Her two children, Paul and Sari, were born in Peru. Returning to the US in 1958, she began working again with Joseph and Clara Pilates at their studio in New York City. She also taught ballet. Toward the end of his life, Pilates named Kryzanowska as the director of The Pilates Studio. Romana and Clara Pilates continued to operate Joseph Pilates' original studio. Romana also filed a trademark registration in 1988 for the name Pilates even though Joe never referred to his work as Pilates. He called it Contrology. On October 19, 2000, the Pilates trademark registration was canceled in the Southern District court in New York by Judge Cedarbaum.

== Publications ==
The Joseph H. Pilates Archive Collection: Photographs, Writings and Designs, Sean P. Gallagher and Romana Kryzanowska, ISBN 1-891696-13-0
The Pilates Method of Body Conditioning - An Introduction to the Core Exercises, Sean P. Gallagher and Romana Kryzanowska, ISBN 1-891696-08-4
The Complete Writings of Joseph H. Pilates, Joseph Pilates, Romana Kryzanowska, ISBN 1-891696-15-7

== Additional Sources ==
- Romana's Pilates Official Home of Romana Kryzanowska, protégé of Joseph Pilates
- Pilates Information independent website
- New York 1 Broadcast "World Famous Instructor Holds Annual Convention" By Roger Clark - August 4, 2006
