= Joseph Pilates =

German physical trainer (1883–1967)

Joseph Hubertus Pilates
- Pilates in an undated photo
- Born: 9 December 1883; Mönchengladbach, German Empire
- Died: 9 October 1967 (aged 83); New York City, U.S.
- Known for: Developing pilates

Joseph Hubertus Pilates (December 9, 1883 – October 9, 1967) was a German physical trainer, writer, and inventor. He is credited with inventing and promoting the Pilates method of physical fitness. He patented a total of 26 apparatuses in his lifetime.

== Biography ==
=== Early life ===
Joseph Hubertus Pilates was born on 9 December 1883 in Mönchengladbach, Kingdom of Prussia. His father, Heinrich Friedrich Pilates, was a metal worker of Greek descent and prize-winning gymnast; his mother was a naturopath.

Pilates was a sickly child. He suffered from asthma, rickets, and rheumatic fever, and he dedicated his entire life to improving his physical strength. He was introduced by his father to gymnastics and body-building, and to martial arts like jiu-jitsu and boxing. By the age of 14, he was fit enough to pose for anatomical charts. Pilates came to believe that modern lifestyles, poor posture, and inefficient breathing lay at the roots of ill-health. He devised a series of exercises and training techniques, engineering the equipment, specifications, and adjustments needed to teach his methods.

=== Early boxing, circus and self-defense trainer career ===
Pilates had been a gymnast and bodybuilder. In 1912, he moved to England. There, he was a prize fighter, circus performer, and self-defense trainer at police schools and Scotland Yard.

=== Internment during World War I ===
During World War I, the British authorities interned Pilates, along with other German citizens, in Lancaster Castle, where he taught wrestling and self-defense, boasting that his students would emerge stronger than they were before their internment. Pilates studied the movements of animals and trained his fellow inmates in fitness and exercises. He later said that the intuitive movements of cats, in particular, inspired many aspects of his fitness regimen. It was there that he began refining and teaching his minimal-equipment system of mat exercises that later became "Contrology". He was then transferred to another internment camp at Knockaloe on the Isle of Man.

During that involuntary break, he began to develop his concept of an integrated, comprehensive system of physical exercise, which he himself called "Contrology". "Contrology" related to encouraging the use of the mind to control muscles, and focusing attention on core postural muscles that help keep the body balanced and provide support for the spine. In particular, Pilates exercises teach awareness of breath and of alignment of the spine, and strengthen the deep torso and abdominal muscles. Some of the early use of Pilates's exercise methods included rehabilitation of seriously injured veterans.

After World War I, Pilates returned to Germany and collaborated with experts in dance and physical exercise such as Rudolf Laban. In Hamburg, he trained police officers.

=== Move to the US and marriage ===
Around 1925, Pilates immigrated to the United States. On the ship to America, he met his future wife Clara Zeuner. The couple founded a studio in New York City and directly taught and supervised their students well into the 1960s.

Joseph and Clara Pilates soon established a following in the local dance and performing-arts community of New York. The Georgian-American choreographer George Balanchine, who had arrived in the United States in 1933, and Martha Graham, who had come to New York in 1923, became devotees, sending their students to the Pilates for training and rehabilitation.

Joseph Pilates wrote several books, including Return to Life through Contrology and Your Health, and he was also a prolific inventor, with over 26 patents cited.

Pilates continued to advocate for and teach his method well into his old age, even once he was physically incapable of performing the exercises himself.

=== Death ===
Pilates died in New York City in 1967 of advanced emphysema at the age of 83.

== Bibliography ==
- Your Health by Joseph H. Pilates (1934)
- Return to Life Through Contrology by Joseph H. Pilates and William J. Miller (1945)
- Joseph Hubertus Pilates; William John Miller (1960). Return to Life Through Contrology. Christopher Pub. House. Reprint of 1945 book
- "The Pilates Pamphlet: Return to Life Through Contrology" by Joseph H. Pilates and Frederick Rand Rogers (1957)

== In popular culture ==
Joseph Pilates is the subject of the 2013 documentary film A Movement of Movement made by Mark Pedri.
