= Pilates =

Physical fitness system

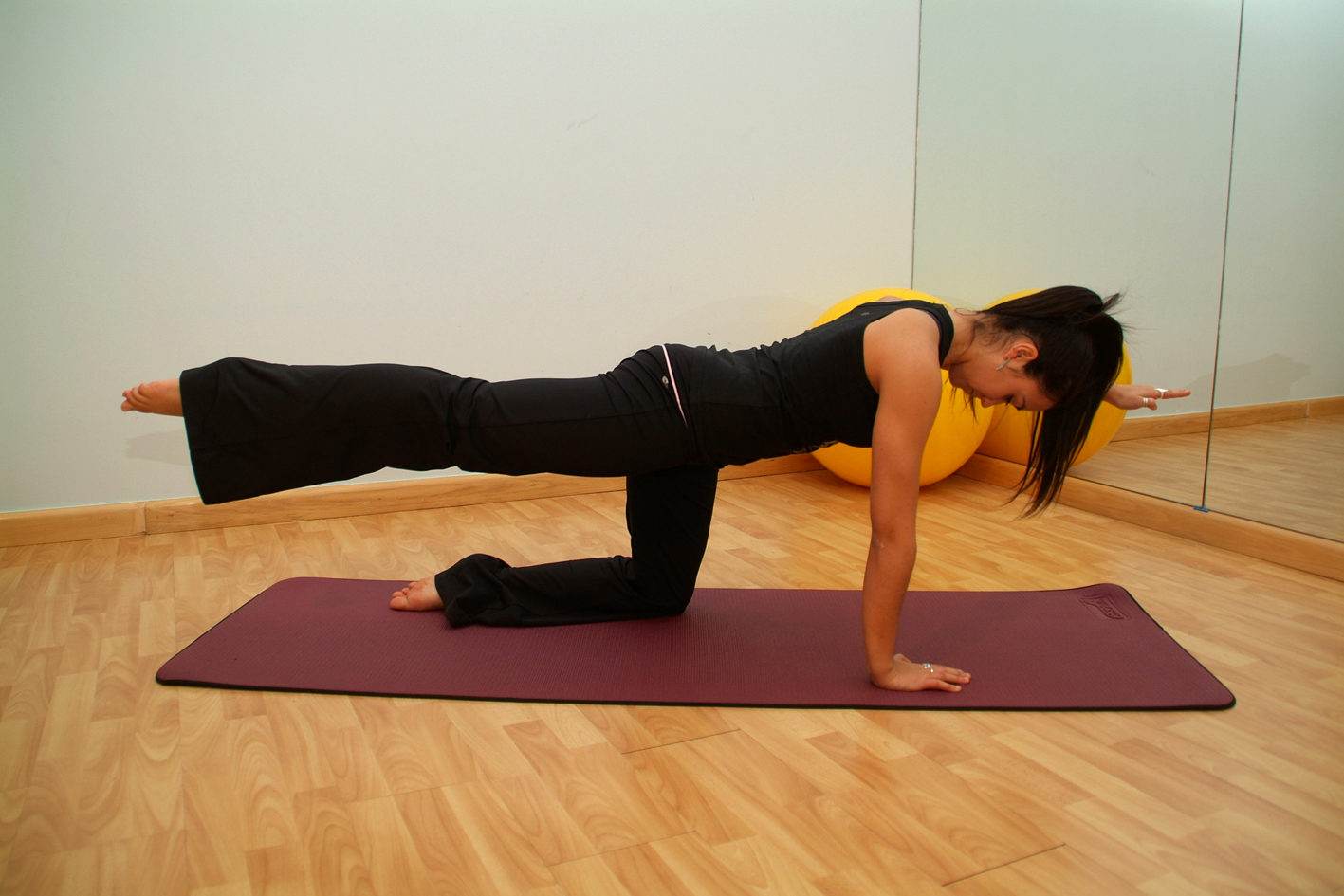
Pilates instructor demonstrating "Bird Dog"

Pilates (/pɪˈlɑːtiːz/; German: [piˈlaːtəs]) is a type of mind-body exercise developed in the early 20th century by Joseph Pilates, after whom it was named. Pilates called his method "Contrology". It is practiced worldwide, especially in Western countries such as Australia, Canada, the United States and the United Kingdom. As of 2005, there were 11 million people practicing the discipline regularly and 14,000 instructors in the United States.

Pilates developed in the aftermath of the late 19th century physical culture of exercising in order to alleviate ill health. There is however only limited evidence to support the use of Pilates to alleviate problems such as lower back pain. Evidence from studies show that while Pilates improves balance, it has not been shown to be an effective treatment for any medical condition other than evidence that regular Pilates sessions can help muscle conditioning in healthy adults, when compared to doing no exercise.

== Description ==
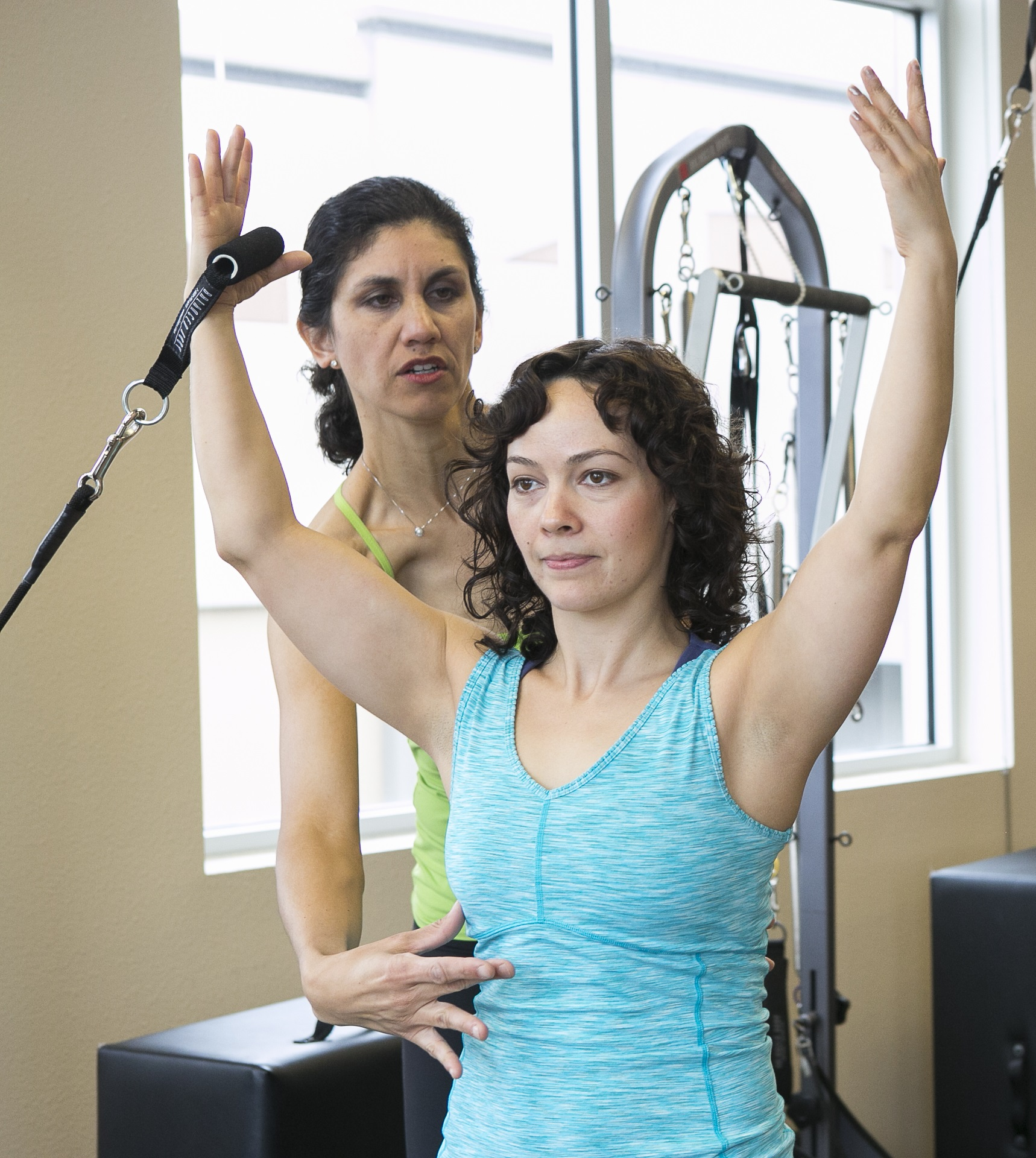
Pilates teacher using verbal and tactile feedback to ensure proper form

Pilates can be described as "a mind–body exercise that requires core stability, strength, and flexibility, and attention to muscle control, posture, and breathing".

In his book Return to Life through Contrology, Joseph Pilates presents his method as the art of controlled movements, which should look and feel like a workout (not a therapy) when properly manifested. If practiced with consistency, Pilates improves flexibility, builds strength and develops control and endurance in the entire body. It puts emphasis on alignment, breathing, developing a strong core, and improving coordination and balance. The core, consisting of the muscles of the abdomen, low back, and hips, is often called the "powerhouse" and is thought to be the key to a person's stability. Pilates' system allows for different exercises to be modified in range of difficulty from beginner to advanced or to any other level, and also in terms of the instructor and practitioner's specific goals and/or limitations. Intensity can be increased over time as the body adapts itself to the exercises.

A number of versions of Pilates are taught today and the majority are based on up to nine principles.

Styles of Pilates exercises and equipment

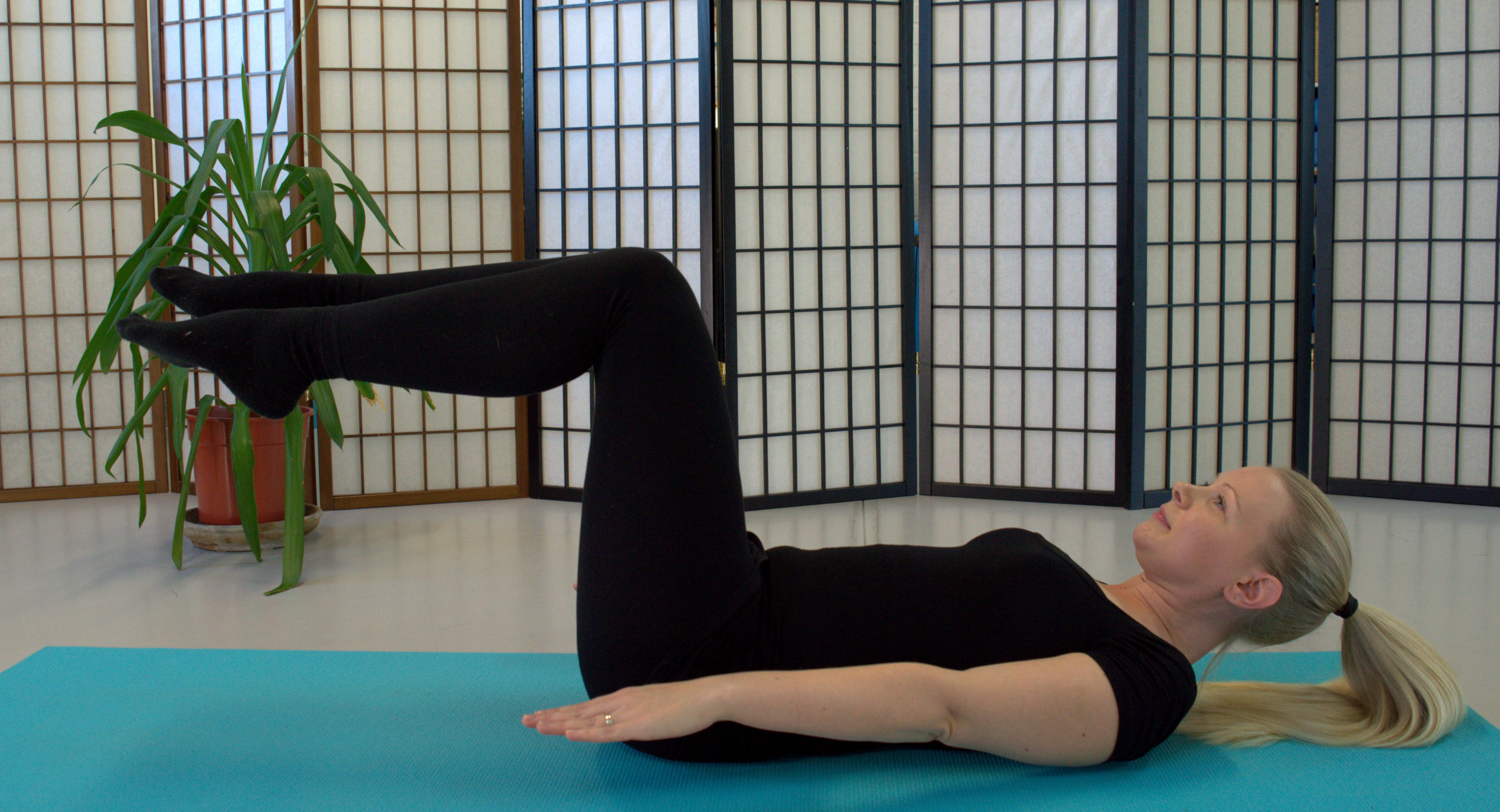
Mat Pilates

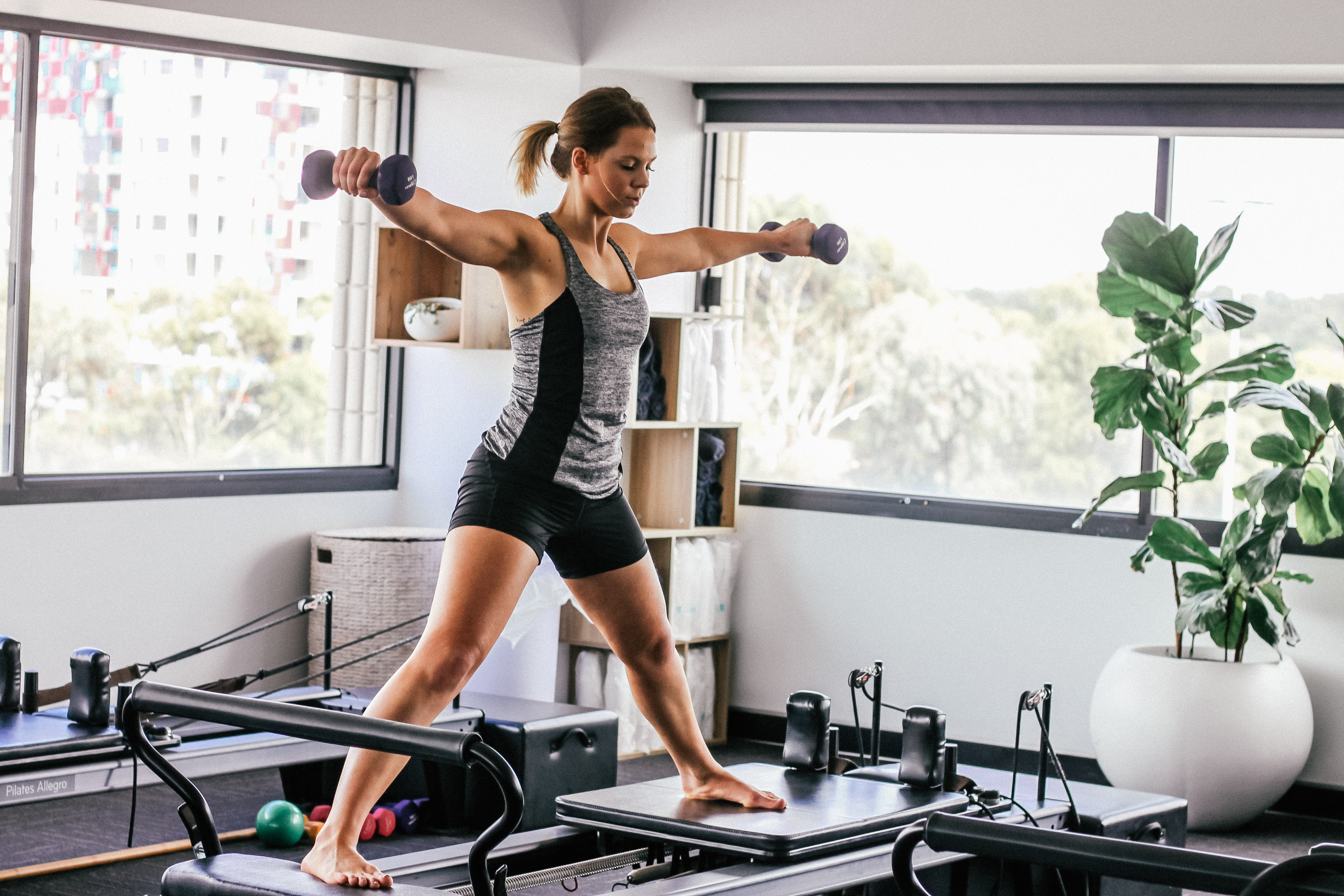
Reformer Pilates

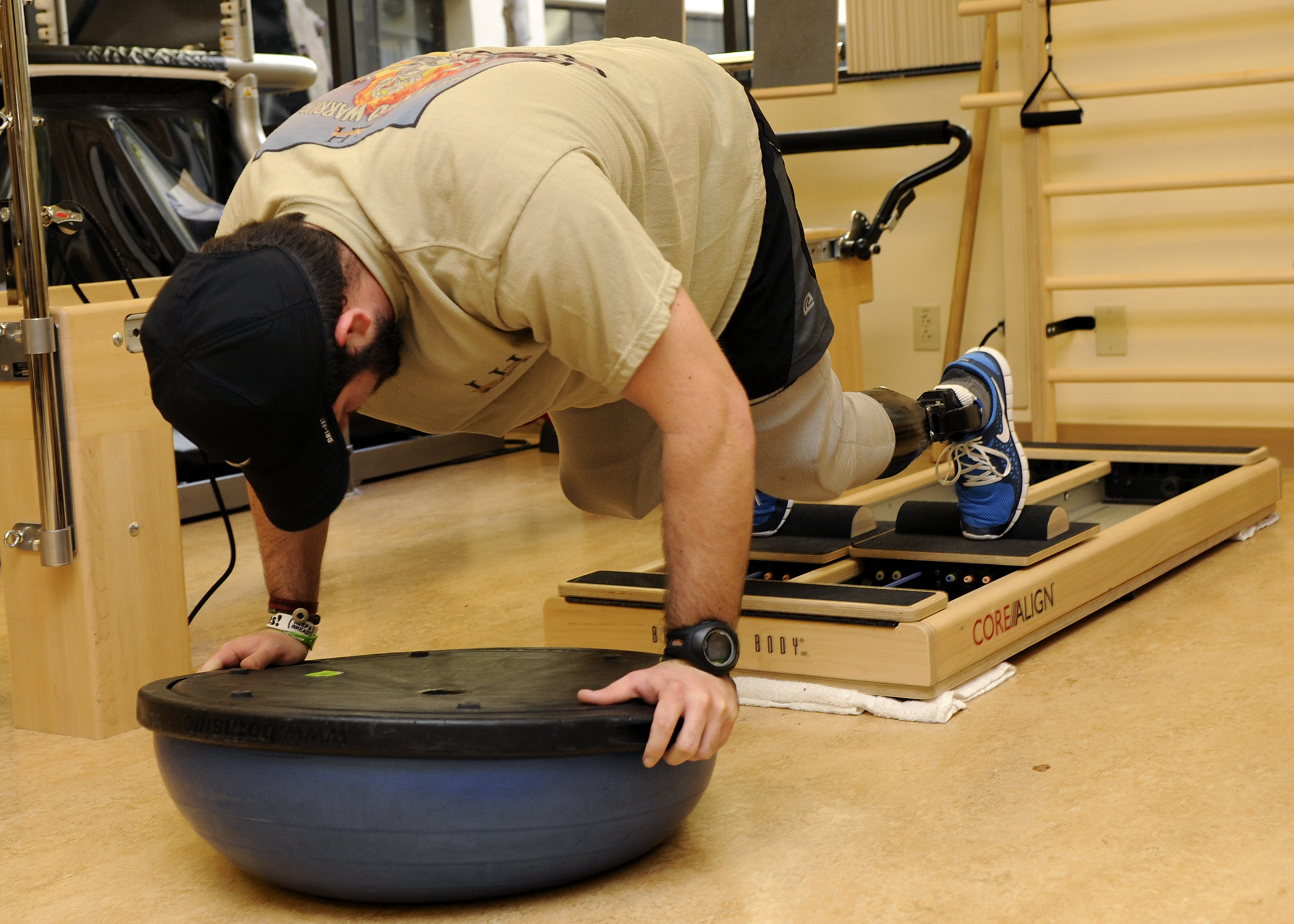
Core align plates machine

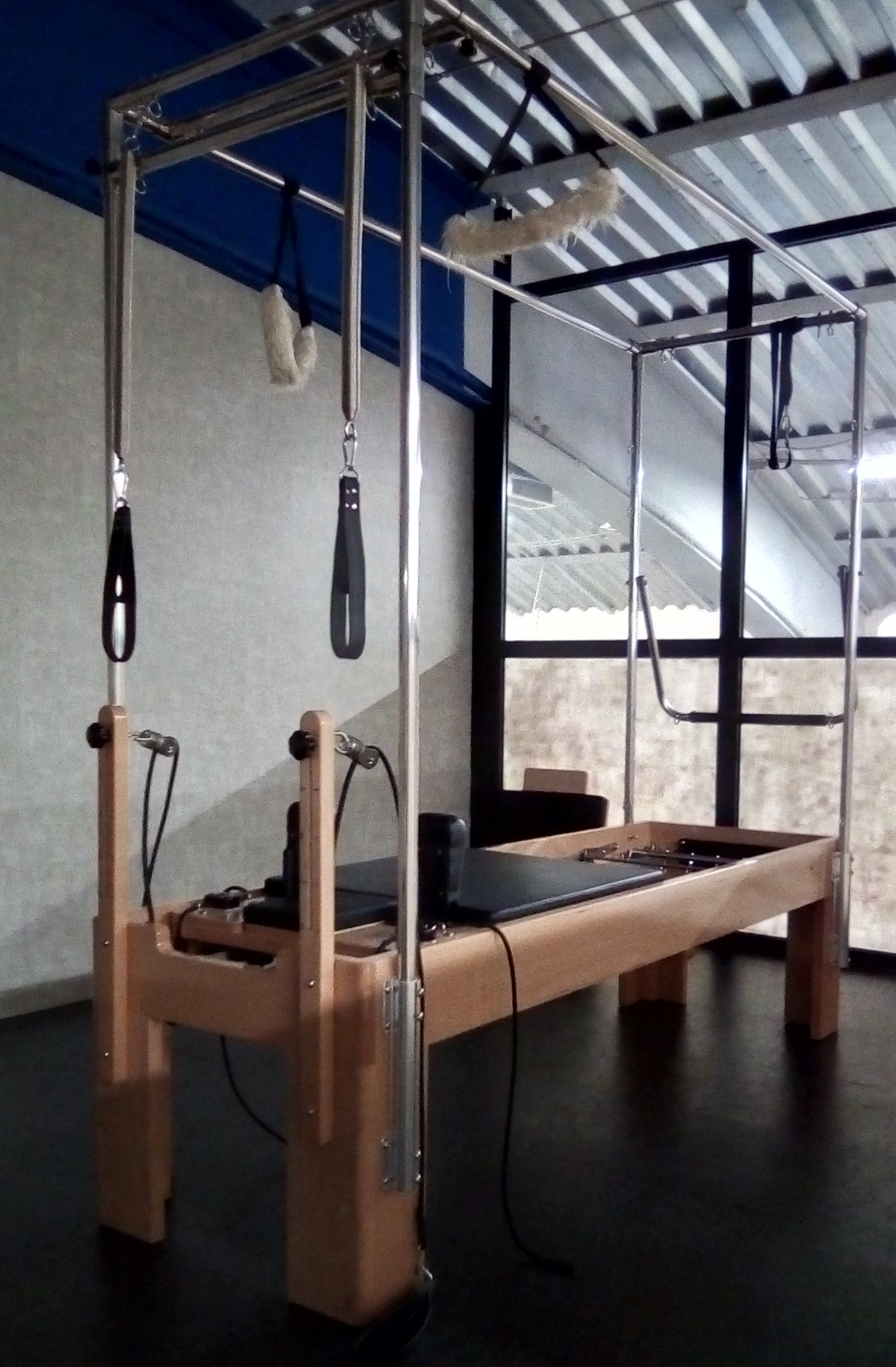
Trapeze table

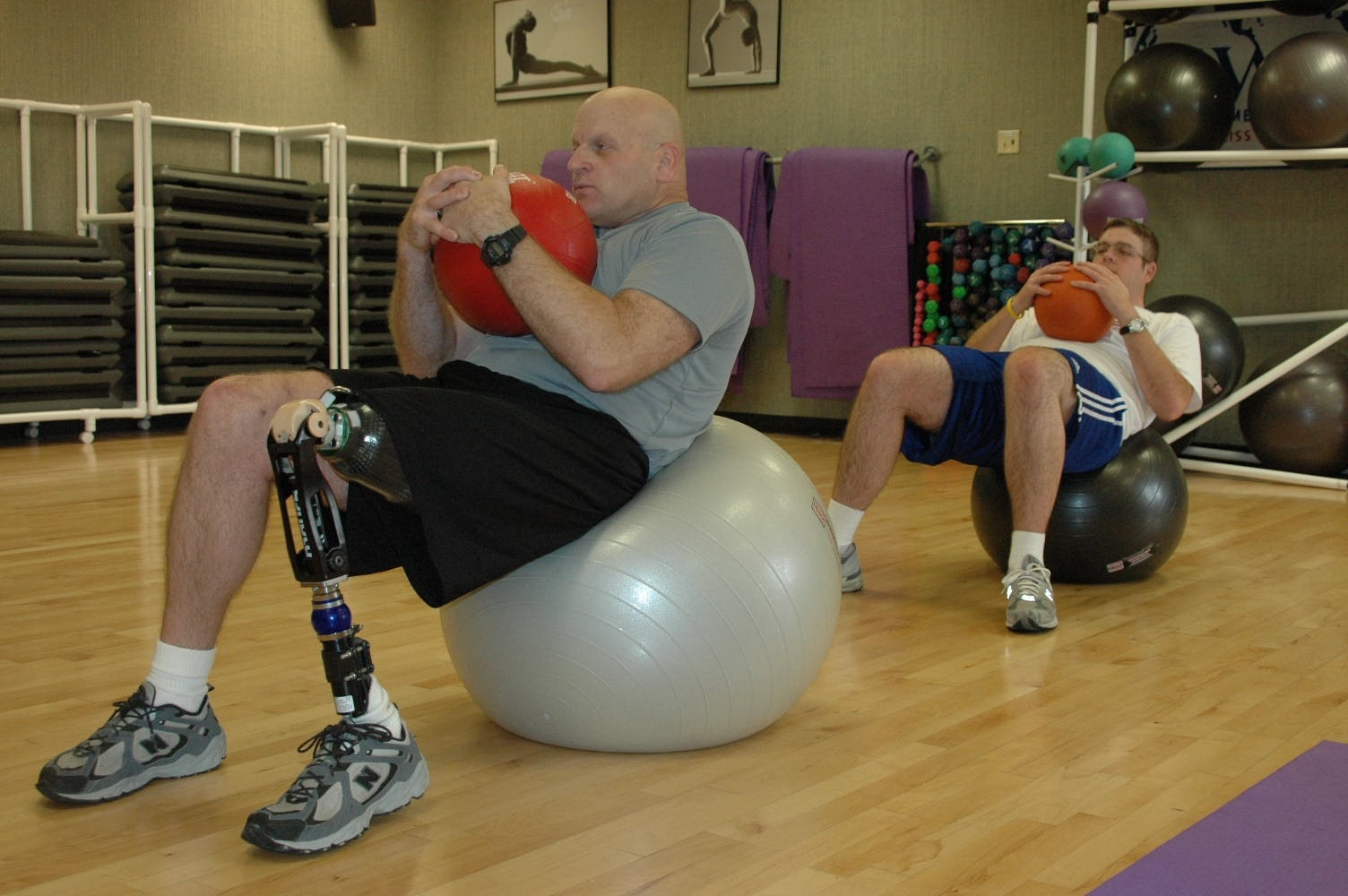
Pilates ball

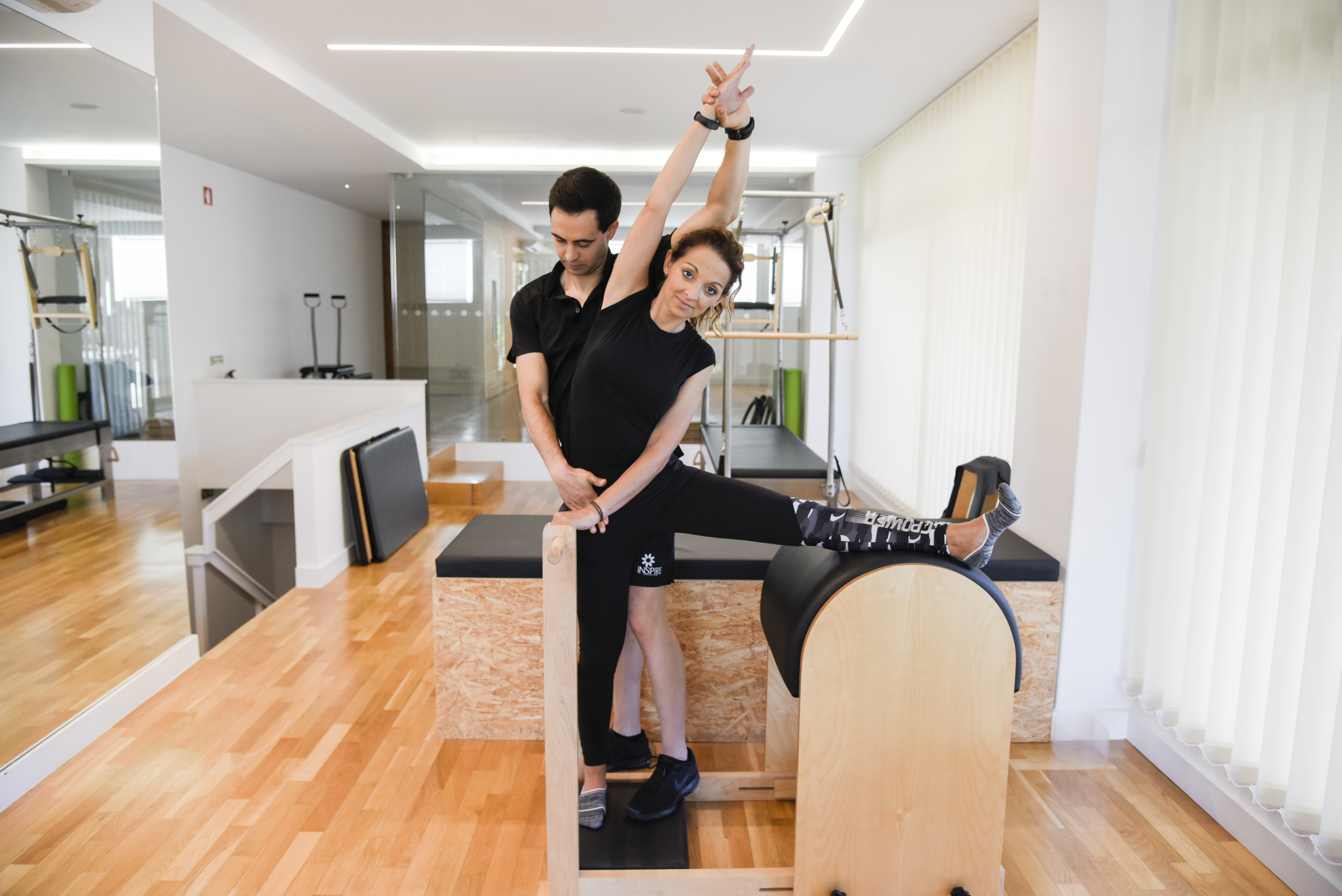
Barrel Pilates

== Comparison with yoga ==
Modern yoga, like Pilates, is a mind-and-body discipline, though yoga classes are more likely to address spiritual aspects explicitly. Some poses are similar in the two disciplines; for example, open leg balance closely resembles Navasana, boat pose; roll over is similar to Halasana, plough pose; and swan and push-up are essentially identical to Bhujangasana, cobra pose and Chaturanga Dandasana, low plank pose, respectively. Both disciplines develop strength, flexibility, and fitness. Pilates, however, emphasises core strength where yoga emphasizes flexibility.

== History ==
Pilates was developed by Joseph Pilates, from Mönchengladbach, Germany. His father was a gymnast and his mother a naturopath.

During the first half of the twentieth century, he developed a system of exercises which were intended to strengthen the human mind and body. Pilates believed that mental and physical health were interrelated.

In his youth he had practiced many of the physical training regimens available in Germany, and it was from these he developed his own method. It has clear connections with the physical culture of the late nineteenth century and the somatic movement, such as the use of special apparatuses and claims that the exercises could cure ill health; the same cultural milieu and zeitgeist also included the tradition of "corrective exercise" or "medical gymnastics" as typified by Pehr Henrik Ling.

Pilates said that the inspiration for his method came to him during World War I, while he was being held as an enemy national at the British Knockaloe internment camp on the Isle of Man. He developed his method there over four years, working on his fellow internees.

Joseph Pilates accompanied his method with a variety of equipment, for which he used the term "apparatus". Each apparatus was designed to help accelerate the process of stretching, strengthening, body alignment and increased core strength started by the mat work. The best-known and most popular apparatus today, the Reformer, was originally called the Universal Reformer, aptly named for "universally reforming the body". Eventually Pilates designed other apparatus, including the Cadillac, Wunda Chair, High "Electric" Chair, Spine Corrector, Ladder Barrel and Pedi-Pole.

Pilates published two books related to his training method: Your Health: A Corrective System of Exercising That Revolutionizes the Entire Field of Physical Education in 1934, and Return to Life Through Contrology in 1945.

His first students went on to teach his methods, including: Romana Kryzanowska, Kathy Grant, Jay Grimes, Ron Fletcher, Mary Bowen, Carola Treir, Bob Seed, Eve Gentry, Bruce King, Lolita San Miguel, and Mary Pilates, Joseph's niece. Contemporary Pilates includes both the "Modern" Pilates and the "Classical/Traditional" Pilates. Modern Pilates is partly derived from the teaching of some first generation students, while Classical Pilates aims to preserve the original work as Joseph Pilates taught it.

== Effectiveness ==
In 2015 the Australian Government's Department of Health published a meta study which reviewed recent literature on 17 alternative therapies including Pilates, in order to determine whether any were suitable for being covered by health insurance. The review found that due to the small number and methodologically limited nature of the studies then available, evidence for the effectiveness of Pilates was uncertain. Accordingly, in 2017, the Australian government named Pilates a practice that would not qualify for insurance subsidy. A subsequent review conducted for the Department of Health recommended in 2025 that insurance coverage for Pilates be reinstated, and the Australian government has reinstated coverage.

For the treatment of lower back pain, low quality evidence suggests that while Pilates is better than doing nothing, it is no more effective than other forms of physical exercise. There is some evidence regular sessions can help with the conditioning of the abdominal muscles of healthy people, when compared to doing no exercise. There is no good evidence it helps improve balance in elderly people.

== Trademark status ==
Pilates is not professionally regulated.

In October 2000 "Pilates" was ruled a generic term by a U.S. federal court, making it free for unrestricted use in the U.S. The term is usually still capitalized in writing because it is the last name of the method's founder, although eponymous terms in English are not always capitalized.

As a result of the court ruling, the Pilates Method Alliance was formed as a professional association for the Pilates community. Its purpose was to provide an international organization to connect teachers, teacher trainers, studios, and facilities dedicated to preserving and enhancing the legacy of Joseph H. Pilates and his exercise method by establishing standards, encouraging unity, and promoting professionalism.

== See also ==
- Calisthenics
- Meditation
- Squatting position
- Yoga
