= Thank You Allah =

Album by Maher Zain

Studio album by Maher Zain
- Released: November 1, 2009
- Recorded: 2007–2009
- Genre: RnB, Islamic, soul
- Length: 56:36 (standard edition); 1:14:13 (standard edition, with bonus tracks)
- Language: Arabic, English, French, Turkish, Urdu, Malay, Bahasa
- Label: Awakening
- Producer: Maher Zain, Bara Kherigi

Maher Zain chronology
Thank You Allah (2009)	Forgive Me (2012)

Singles from Thank You Allah
- 1. "Palestine Will Be Free" Released: August 8, 2009; 2. "Insha Allah" Released: May 1, 2010; 3. "The Chosen One" Released: August 1, 2010; 4. "Ya Nabi Salam Alayka" Released: August 13, 2011; 5. "For The Rest Of My Life" Released: September 27, 2011

Thank You Allah is the debut studio album by Muslim Swedish singer Maher Zain. The album was released on November 1, 2009, by Awakening Records, with 13 songs and two bonus tracks. Zain's debut album is accompanied by three singles, each with its own music video. The album has achieved 8× platinum sales record in Malaysia as of January 2011 and has sold over 300,000 copies (20× platinum) as of June 2016. Zain produced this album with Swedish producer from Bilal Hajji.

In September 2011, Maher Zain received a nomination in the 18th Anugerah Industri Muzik, a Malaysian music award ceremony. He was nominated in the "Best Malay Song Performed by a Foreign Artist" category for his single Insha Allah (Malay). The eventual winner in November 2011 was "Ku Menunggu" by Indonesian singer Rossa.

== Music videos ==
- The music video for "Palestine Will Be Free" was released on August 8, 2009. The video features the story of a young brave Palestinian girl who never loses hope for a better future despite the harsh realities surrounding her. Since its official release, the music video has garnered more than 19 million views on YouTube.
- The "Insha Allah" music video was released on May 1, 2010. Awakening Records produced it in four languages, with the English version being used as the official music video. Awakening Records then released the video in Arabic, French and Turkish. The music video has gained more than 20 million views since it was premiered on YouTube. It was directed by Mike Harris. The song is also available in a Malay version.
- The music video for "The Chosen One" was released on August 1, 2010. This music video serves as a tribute to the Islamic Prophet Muhammad. It has received more than 7 million views on YouTube. and was video directed by Lena Khan. The video featured this spiritual acknowledgement at the end: "All acts of kindness in this video have been inspired by the life and teachings of Prophet Muhammad (S.A.W)".
- Maher announced the music video for "Ya Nabi Salam Alayka" as a promo on 28 July 2011 at YouTube. The official music video was directed by Hamza Jamjoum and released on August 13, 2011.

== Track listing ==
No.	Title	Writer(s)	Length
1.	"Always Be There"	Maher Zain, Bilal Hajji	4:26
2.	"Ya Nabi Salam Alayka"	Maher Zain, Bara Kherigi, Salah Galal, Yaren, Waheed Shabir, Hamza Namira	4:59
3.	"Insha Allah"	Maher Zain, Hamza Namira, Bara Kherigi	4:26
4.	"Palestine Will Be Free"	Maher Zain, Hamza Namira, Bara Kherigi	4:55
5.	"Thank You Allah"	Maher Zain, Bara Kherigi	5:30
6.	"Allah Hi Allah Kiya Karo" (featuring Irfan Makki)	Bara Kherigi, Irfan Makki, Islamic Heritage, Maher Zain	5:14
7.	"The Chosen One"	Maher Zain, Bara Kherigi	3:54
8.	"Baraka Allahu Lakuma"	Maher Zain, Hamza Namira, Bara Kherigi	4:30
9.	"For The Rest Of My Life"	Maher Zain, Charbel Amso, Abou-Daniell, Bara Kherigi	3:54
10.	"Hold My Hand"	Maher Zain, Bilal Hajji	4:06
11.	"Awaken"	Maher Zain, Suzy Kanoo, Bara Khreigi	3:43
12.	"Subhan Allah" (featuring Mesut Kurtis)	Maher Zain, Bara Kherigi, Salah Galal, Islamic Heritage	4:54
13.	"Open Your Eyes"	Maher Zain, Bara Kherigi	4:26

Bonus Tracks
No.	Title	Writer(s)	Length
14.	"Ya Nabi [Arabic Version] | يا نبي سلام عليك"	Salah Galal, Maher Zain, Hamza Namira	4:59
15.	"Thank You Allah [Acoustic Version]"	Bara Khreigi, Maher Zain	5:28

French Version Bonus Tracks
No.	Title	Writer(s)	Length
1.	"Toujours Proche"	Farid Abdelkarim, Maher Zain, Bilal Hajji	4:26
2.	"Insha Allah (French Version)"

Arabic Version Bonus Tracks
No.	Title	Writer(s)	Length
1.	"Ya Nabi Salam Alayka (Arabic Version) | يا نبي سلام عليك"	Salah Galal, Maher Zain, Hamza Namira	4:59
2.	"Insha Allah (Arabic Version) | ان شاء الله"	Sameh Khairy, Maher Zain, Hamza Namira length2 = 4:26

Turkish Version Bonus Tracks
No.	Title	Length
1.	"Insha Allah (Turkish Version)"
2.	"Subhana Allah feat. Mesut Kurtis (Turkish Version)"

Bahasa Version Bonus Tracks
No.	Title	Length
1.	"Insha Allah feat. Fadly "Padi""
2.	"Sepanjang Hidup"

Malay Version Bonus Tracks
No.	Title	Length
1.	"Insya Allah (Malay Version)"
2.	"Sepanjang Hidup"
3.	"Insha Allah feat. Fadly "Padi""

Limited Edition Bonus Tracks
No.	Title	Length
1.	"Insya Allah (Malay Version)"
2.	"Sepanjang Hidup"

=== Thank You Allah Platinum Edition (Malaysia) ===
Thank You Allah Platinum Edition
- Cover of Thank You Allah Platinum Edition (Malaysia)

Studio album by Maher Zain
- Released: March 1, 2011
- Genre: Islamic, Pop, World
- Label: Warner Music Malaysia
- Producer: Maher Zain, Bara Kherigi

Thank You Allah Platinum Edition was released in Malaysia with tracks 1–13 identical to the ordinary version. But the Platinum Edition included three bonus (tracks 14–16) including Malay language version of "Insha Allah".

1. "Always Be There"
2. "Ya Nabi Salam Alayka"
3. "Insha Allah"
4. "Palestine Will Be Free"
5. "Thank You Allah"
6. "Allahi Allah Kiya Karo" (featuring Irfan Makki)
7. "The Chosen One"
8. "Baraka Allahu Lakuma"
9. "For The Rest of My Life"
10. "Hold My Hand"
11. "Awaken"
12. "Subhana Allah" (featuring Mesut Kurtis)
13. "Open Your Eyes"
14. "Ya Nabi Salam Alayka" (Arabic Version)
15. "Insha Allah" (Malay Version)
16. "Insha Allah" (Acoustic Version)

=== Thank You Allah Platinum Edition 2012 (Indonesia) ===
Thank You Allah Platinum Edition 2012 (Indonesia)

Studio album by Maher Zain
- Released: 2012
- Genre: Pop, World, Nasheed
- Label: Sony Music Indonesia
- Producer: Maher Zain, Bara Kherigi

Disc 1

1. "Insha Allah" (with Fadly 'Padi')
2. "Always Be There"
3. "Ya Nabi Salam Alayka"
4. "Palestine Will Be Free"
5. "Thank You Allah"
6. "Allahi Allah Kiya Karo" (feat. Irfan Makki)
7. "The Chosen One"
8. "Baraka Allahu Lakuma"
9. "Sepanjang Hidup" (For The Rest of My Life – Bahasa Version)
10. "Hold My Hand"
11. "Awaken"
12. "Subhana Allah" (feat. Mesut Kurtis)
13. "Open Your Eyes"
14. "For The Rest of My Life"
15. "Insha Allah"

Disc 2

1. "Insha Allah" (Acoustic Version)
2. "The Chosen One" (Acoustic Version)
3. "For The Rest of My Life" (Acoustic Version)
4. "Thank You Allah" (Acoustic Version)
5. "Open Your Eyes" (Percussion Version)
6. "Ya Nabi Salam Alayka" (Arabic Version)
7. "Ya Nabi Salam Alayka" (Turkish Version)
8. "Toujours Proche" (Always Be There – French Version)
9. "Insha Allah" (Arabic Version)
10. "Insha Allah" (Turkish Version)
11. "Insha Allah" (French Version)
12. "Insha Allah" (Malay Version)

== Charts ==
Chart performance for Thank You Allah
Chart (2023)	Peak position
Belgian Albums (Ultratop Flanders)	117

== Certifications ==
Certifications for Thank You Allah
Country	Certifications	Sales
Malaysia	8× Platinum	250,000^{[note 1]}
Indonesia	20× Platinum	750,000^{[note 2]}

== Footnotes ==
- Note 1: As of April 2012.
- Note 2: Based on the 10× Platinum certifications that it received in October 2011.
