= Raef (singer) =

Egyptian-American singer (born 1982)

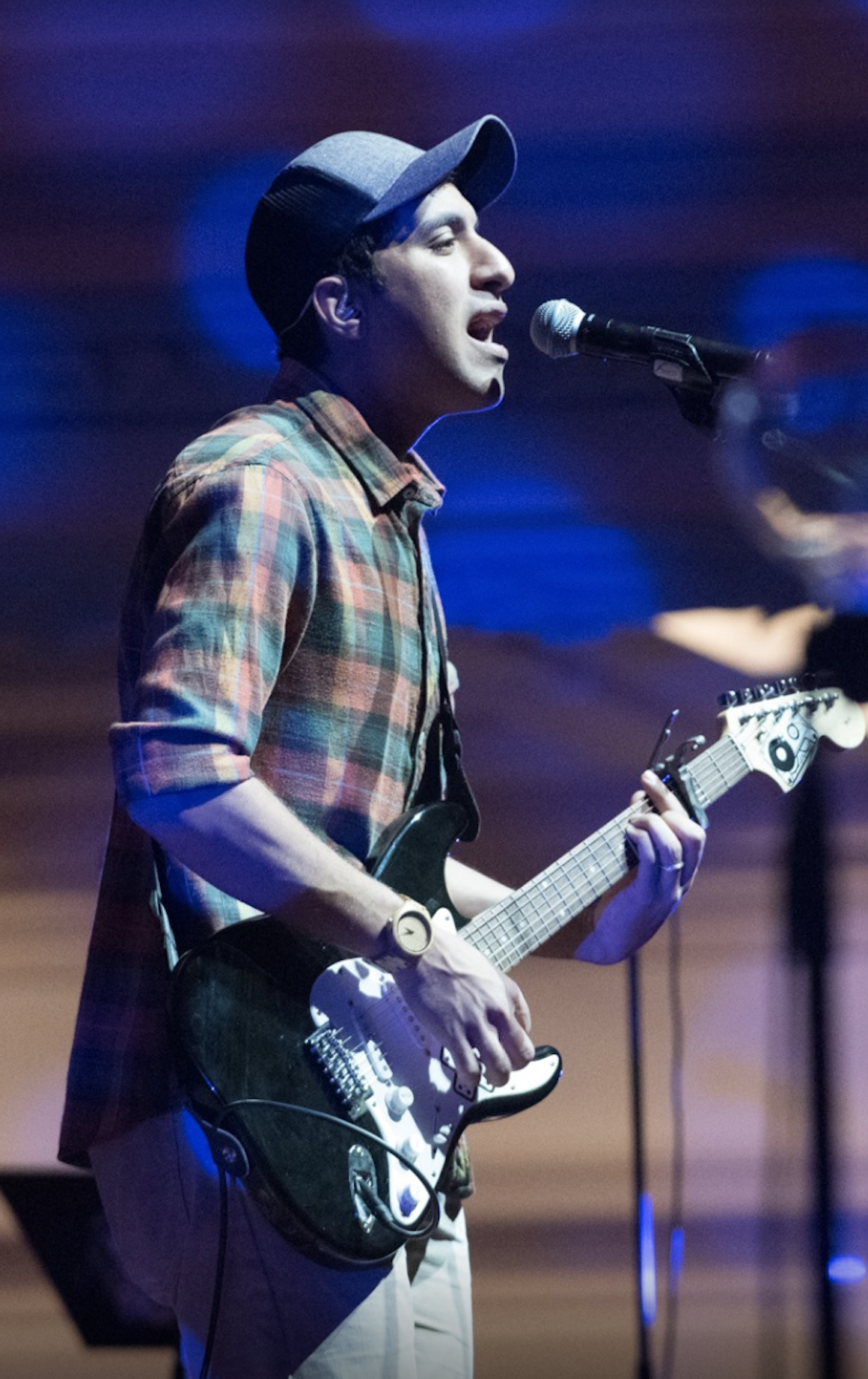
- Raef in London, United Kingdom 2017

Background information
- Born: Raef Haggag; August 8, 1982 (age 44); Washington, D.C., U.S.
- Origin: United States
- Genres: Rock; acoustic; folk
- Occupation: Singer
- Instruments: Vocals; guitar
- Years active: 2006–present
- Labels: Awakening 2012–present; Rotana; Universal Music Mena
- Website: www.raefmusic.com

Raef Haggag (Arabic: رائف حجاج; born August 8, 1982) is an Egyptian-American singer. He is currently signed to and managed by Awakening Music.

== Beginnings ==
Raef picked up playing guitar during his time at the University of Maryland, College Park where he studied computer science.

After graduation, Raef worked briefly as a software engineer before leaving to teach high school for eight years. As he says:

"I decided to switch careers from a software eng. to a high school teacher because I wanted to help others in a more direct way (and because it was pretty boring sitting in front of a computer for 8 hours a day)". Raef taught computer programming in Montgomery County Public Schools.

== Music career ==
Teaching gave Raef more time to focus on songwriting, often performing at local coffee shops and busking at metro stations. He was introduced to the national stage after his trio rock band "Great Seneca" toured the United States of America as part of the "Voices for Change" initiative. Raef also joined the "Poetic Vision Tour"; a band of traveling musicians and poets catering to the American Muslim community. Raef did several Muslim-themed covers of popular mainstream songs, attracting young listeners wanting a modern take on religious music

Raef signed with Awakening Records and released his debut album The Path in 2014. In the summer of 2019 he released his second album Mercy with a notable shift towards rock and country music.

== Success in Indonesia ==
Since the release of his debut album The Path, Raef has made several trips to Indonesia to promote his music and perform at live concerts. Appearing on Indonesian national television and invited by Bandung mayor Ridwan Kamil to perform at the Bandung Conference brought Raef and his music to millions of Indonesians. Raef was also the star host on 30 episodes of The Journey of a Backpacker, a Ramadan TV series that aired on Kompas TV (later Trans7) across Indonesia and TV Alhijrah in Malaysia. In August 2015, Raef was awarded the "Platinum Award" for record sales in Indonesia. Following the blueprint of Season 1 of "The Journey of a Backpacker", Raef hosted Season 2, airing on Trans7, in which he traveled across Java, visiting 30 historic and iconic mosques.

== "We Are Home" music video project ==
Using Detroit-based crowdfunding platform LaunchGood, over $22,000 via online donations were raised to fund the music video for "Home," directed by Los-Angeles based director, Lena Khan. The video shows Raef walking through American history observing contributions made by various immigrants to the United States. The video also features contributions made by Native Americans.

== "Dear America" music video project ==
In his second crowdfunded music video project, Raef raised over $15,000 to fund the music video for "Dear America," directed by Washington DC based film director, Anas Tolba. The video shows clips of Americans across the spectrum experiencing a shared pain, highlighting "the reality of persistent injustices and divisions that are ripping our country apart". "Dear America" won several awards, including New York Movie Award's "Best Music Video"

== Philanthropy ==
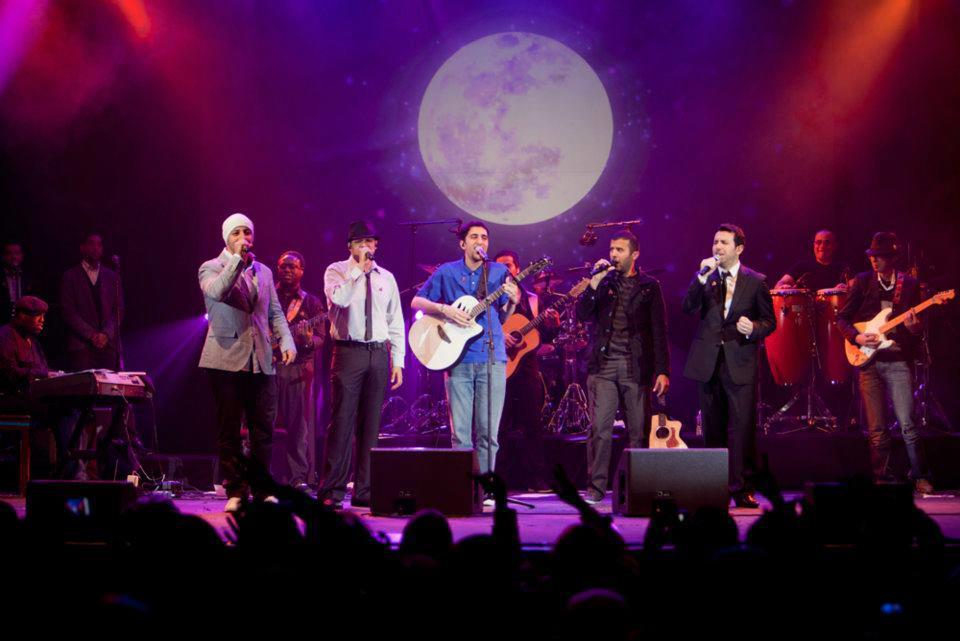
(From left) Maher Zain, Irfan Makki, Raef, Hamza Namira, Mesut Kurtis in "Send a little hope" UK tour, London, April 2012.

- On 14 April 2012, Raef took part in "Send a Little Hope" charity concert organized by Awakening Records and Save an Orphan organization at London's Hammersmith Apollo with Hamza Namira, Irfan Makki, Maher Zain and Mesut Kurtis to raise awareness and collect donations. Over £175,000 were pledged on the night.

== Discography ==
=== Albums ===
Year	Title	Track list
2014	The Path: Released: 5 June 2014; Record label: Awakening Records	1. Peace & Blessings (3:40); 2. The Bright Moon (Tala'al Badru) (4:37); 3. So Real (feat. Maher Zain) (4:02); 4. You Are the One (3:38); 5. Home (3:07); 6. No One Knows but Me (4:00); 7. The Path (3:43); 8. Mawlaya (4:01); 9. Call on Him (3:51); 10. Freedom Ain't Free (feat. Nano Omar) (3:27); 11. Dream (4:49); 12. You're There (3:20)
2019	Mercy: Released: 2019; Record label: Awakening Records	1. Alhamdu Lillah (3:07); 2. Mercy (3:56); 3. All About Me (3:42); 4. More Than Me and You (4:29); 5. Subhan Allah (3:43); 6. Ramadan is Here (3:51); 7. Trush (3:07); 8. Dear America (3:29); 9. My Life Matters (3:32); 10. Southern Salawat (4:03); 11. Muhammad Noor (feat. Sintesa) (3:25); 12. The Land of Light (4:17); 13. Who Are You? (3:32); 14. All About Me (Acoustic) (feat. Dawud Wharnsby) (4:43)
2024	First Light: Released: 2024; Record label: Awakening Records	1. First Light (3:45); 2. Robin Hood's Tune (2:54); 3. Bread And Circus (4:56); 4. Drifting Winds (3:24); 5. Freedom (4:01); 6. Castaway Blues (3:07); 7. The Literalist (4:01); 8. The Path (3:07); 9. Death Of Casanova (2:01); 10. Don Quixote Blues (1:49); 11. Sunken Ships (3:06); 12. Cowboy, Teacher, And Troubadour (3:32)

== Videography ==
Year	Title	Additional details
2011	"It's Jumuah [ Friday ]"	Rebecca Black Cover
2011	"Redemption Song"	Bob Marley Cover
2012	"Your Mercy"	Maroon 5 Cover
2012	"Rabbee I'm Yours"	Jason Mraz Cover
2012	"With You"	Chris Brown Cover)
2012	"Man in the Mirror"	Michael Jackson Cover)
2014	"So Real" (Raef feat. Maher Zain)	
2014	"You Are The One"	Cartoon video
2014	"You Are The One"	Music video
2014	"Home"	#WeAreHome video
2015	"Price Tag" / "Kun Anta"	Jessie J / Humood Cover
2015	"Tala'Al Badru " (D'MASIV with Raef)	
2015	"Deck the Halls"	Cover
2017	"You're There"	
2018	"Ramadan Is Here"	
2019	"Trust"	
2019	"Southern Salawat"	
2019	"Land Of Light"	
2020	"Dear America"	
2021	"One More Night"	
