= Talaʽ al-Badru ʽAlayna =

Traditional Islamic song and nasheed written in 622

Song
- Language: Arabic
- Written: 622
- Songwriter: al-Ansar (the Helpers)

Tala al-Badru Alayna (Arabic: طلع البدر علينا, romanized: Ṭalaʿ al-Badru ʿAlaynā) is a traditional Islamic nasheed.

Many sources state that it was first sung when Muhammed reached Medina after leaving his hometown of Mecca during the Hijra. The second line reads “from the Thaniyāt al-Wadāʿ” (ﻣﻦ ﺛﻨﻴﺎﺕ ﺍﻟﻮﺩﺍﻉ). Some interpret this as referring to a pass north of Medina and therefore argue that the report is geographically unlikely, since Muhammad is said to have first arrived at Qubāʾ, south of the city. However, classical geographical sources indicate that more than one location bore this name. The medieval geographer Yāqūt al-Ḥamawī described Thaniyat al-Wadāʿ as a pass used by travellers heading toward Mecca, and other early writers likewise mention a similarly named pass on the Meccan side of Medina. The poem itself uses the plural “Thaniyāt,” which some scholars have taken to imply multiple passes. Ibn Hajar al-ʽAsqalani recorded that many authorities identified a Thaniyat al-Wadāʿ on the Mecca road, while also acknowledging another of the same name on the Syrian side. Reports cited by the historian al-Samḥūdī describe Muhammad approaching from Qubāʾ and then passing near an area identified as Thaniyat al-Wadāʿ before entering the city. On this basis, a number of historians regard the geographical objection as inconclusive and consider the reference compatible with a southern as well as a northern approach.

The alternative opinion mainly put forth by Ibn Hajar al-ʽAsqalani is that it was sung for Muhammad upon his arrival at Medina, to welcome him after completing the Battle of Tabuk.

== Lyrics ==
Arabic	Pronunciation (Arabic)	Translation (English)
طلع البدر علينا	ṭala‘a 'l-badru ‘alaynā	The full moon rose over us
من ثنيات الوداع	min thaniyyāti 'l-wadā‘	From the valley of Wada'
وجب الشكر علينا	wajaba 'l-shukru ‘alaynā	And it is incumbent upon us to show gratitude
ما دعا للـه داع	mā da‘ā li-l-lāhi dā‘a	For as long as anyone in existence calls out to God
أيها المبعوث فينا	’ayyuha 'l-mab‘ūthu fīnā	O our Messenger amongst us
جئت ﺑﺎلأمر المطاع	ji’ta bi-l-’amri 'l-muṭā‘	Who comes with the exhortations to be heeded
جئت شرفت المدينة	ji’ta sharrafta 'l-madīnah	You have brought to this city nobility
مرحبا يا خير داع	marḥaban yā khayra dā‘	Welcome you who call us to a good way

== Performances ==
=== Recorded versions ===
There have been many renditions of the song most notably by Payam Azizi, Mishary Rashid Alafasy, Oum Kalthoum, Sami Yusuf, Yusuf Islam/Cat Stevens, Mesut Kurtis, Native Deen, Raef, Maher Zain, Junaid Jamshed, Marufur Rahman and others.

=== Other performances ===
- It was used in the soundtrack of the 1976 film The Message, directed by Moustapha Akkad, and used in scene depicting Muhammad's hijra to Medina.
- It song by Olivia Newton-John as an interlude on her twenty-first album, Grace and Gratitude (2006).
- Little Mosque on the Prairie - Canadian sitcom - The song plays during the closing credits, performed by Maryem Tollar.
- It was used in a piano and symphony piece The Moonlight by Syrian German composer Malek Jandali
- An arrangement by Canadian composer, Laura Hawley, was sung at a holiday concert in Ottawa by a children's choir when Syrian refugees first began arriving in Canada in December 2015.
- Maher Zain sampled the song in his song "Medina" in his 2016 album One.
- Marcus Viana (a Brazilian composer) created an arrangement for the poem and used it in his 2003 album Poemas Místicos do Oriente
- Omar Esa performed it in 2018 in the album My Muslim Family.
- It was sung in the fifth episode of first season of the Turkish series Diriliş: Ertuğrul.
- In May 2021, it was sung collectively by Indian music composers, A. R. Ameen and Yuvan Shankar Raja.

== See also ==
- Hijra
- Yathrib (Medina)
