= Harris J =

British singer (born 1997)

- Born: Alharith Jung; 2 May 1997 (age 29); Chelsea, London, England
- Origin: London, England
- Genres: Pop; R&B; Rap; Nasheed
- Occupations: Singer; Songwriter; Author
- Years active: 2013–present
- Labels: Awakening Music; Virgin EMI
- Member of: Awakening Music

Alharith “Harris” Jung (born 1997), known professionally as Harris J, is a British singer-songwriter and author. After winning a talent contest in 2013, he signed with Awakening Music and released his debut album Salam in 2015. The album's lead single, "Salam Alaikum", became a viral hit (with over 140 million views on YouTube as of 2026), establishing him as a prominent figure in the modern Islamic music scene.

In 2025, Harris J released his comeback EP, Revival. In that same year, he released a single “Qalbi Fil Madinah” along with Maher Zain, which now has 107 million views on YouTube as of March 2026. He is also known for his philanthropic work and advocacy.

== Early life and education ==
Harris J was born in Chelsea, London. He is of diverse heritage, including Indian, Irish, Jamaican, and Polish ancestry, and identifies as a "proud Muslim and a true Brit". He graduated from the BRIT School of Performing Arts and Technology in London.

== Career ==
In 2013, at the age of 16, Harris J won a social media-driven competition organized by the faith-inspired record label Awakening Music, which led to a recording contract. In September 2015, he released his debut album Salam. The lead single, "Salam Alaikum", became an international success, reaching three million views on YouTube within its first month.

Following the success of his debut, Harris J performed in concerts worldwide supporting humanitarian causes. During this period, he released standalone singles under Virgin EMI, such as "Save Me From Myself" and "Kick Down the Door". He also recorded the song "24/7", a collaboration with singer Celina Sharma.

After a hiatus, Harris J released the six-track EP Revival in 2025, produced by Awakening Music. Revival includes his collaboration with Maher Zain, "Qalbi Fil Madinah", which they first performed together live on tour in Indonesia and has become a global hit. Other songs include "O Allah", an emotional song conveying a deeper message about his faith, as well as "I Promise".

== Book ==
In 2017, Harris J authored a children's picture book, Salam Alaikum: A Message of Peace, published by Simon & Schuster. The book uses the lyrics of his hit song of the same name, with illustrations showing strangers performing random acts of kindness.

== Discography ==
=== Studio albums ===
Title	Album details
Salam	Released: 18 September 2015; Label: Awakening Music; Formats: CD, digital download, streaming

=== Extended plays ===
Title	EP details
Phases	Released: 2023; Label: Harris J; Formats: Digital download, streaming
Revival	Released: 1 August 2025; Label: Awakening Music; Formats: Digital download, streaming

=== Singles ===
List of singles, showing year released and album name
Title	Year	Album
"Salam Alaikum"	2015	Salam
"Good Life"	2015	Salam
"Save Me from Myself"	2017	Non-album singles
"Human"	2019	Non-album singles
"Kick Down The Door"	2020	Non-album singles
"24/7" (with Celina Sharma)	2021	Non-album singles
"O Allah"	2021	Non-album singles
"Hourriya (Freedom)" (featuring Lowkey)	2024	Revival
"Qalbi Fil Madinah" (with Maher Zain)	2025	Revival
