= Mesut Kurtis =

Turkish-Macedonian singer (born 1981)

- Mesut Kurtiş
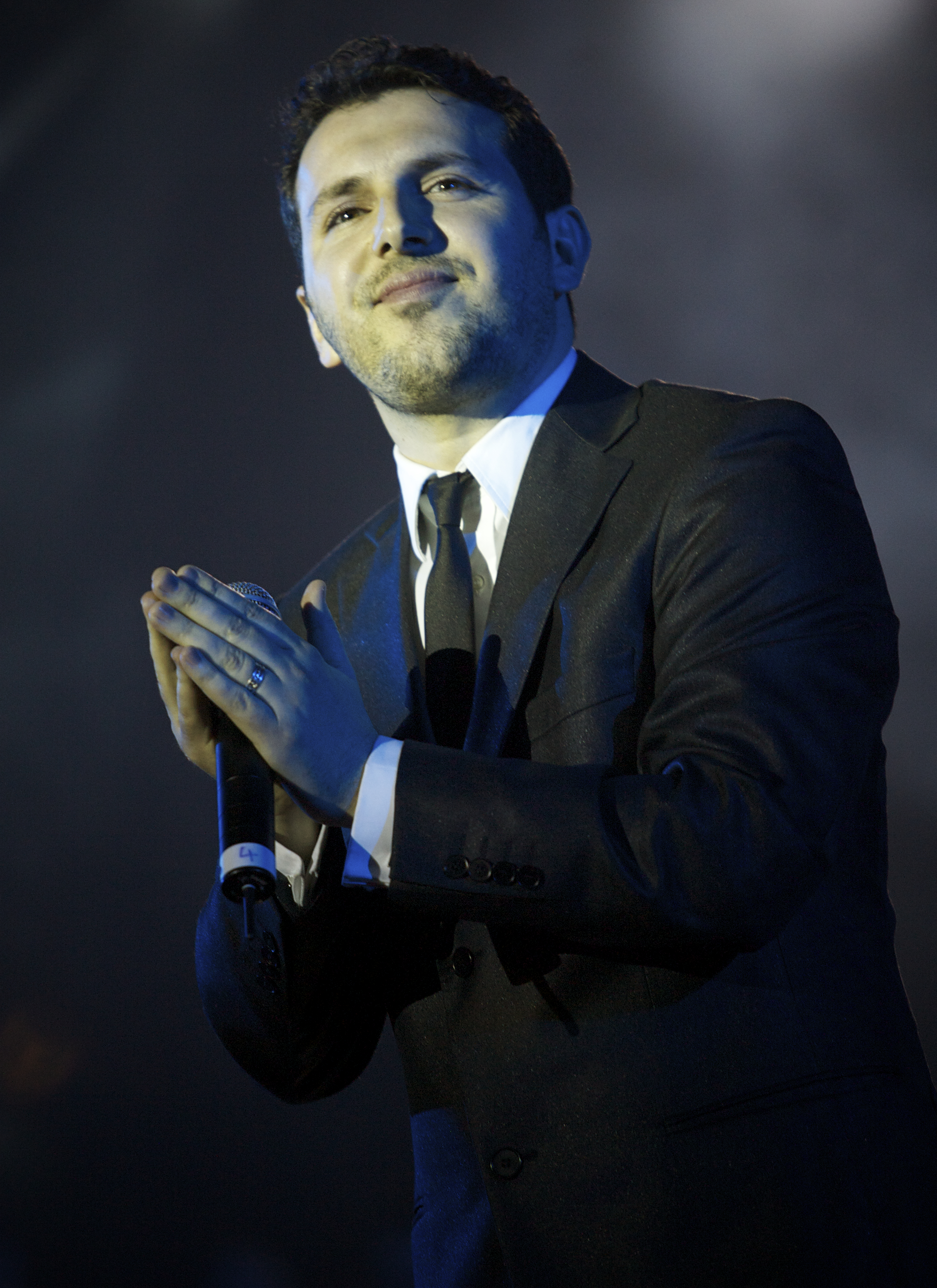
- Kurtis performing at a concert at the American University in Cairo in 2010
- Born: 31 July 1981 (age 45); Skopje, SR Macedonia, SFR Yugoslavia
- Occupations: Singer; songwriter
- Years active: 2000–present
- Musical career
- Genres: Nasheed; Sufi music; hamd; na`at; World music; Arabic music; Khaliji
- Instrument: Vocals
- Labels: Awakening; Rotana
- Website: www.mesutkurtis.com

Mesut Kurtis (Turkish: Mesut Kurtiş; Arabic: مسعود كُرتش) is a Turkish-Macedonian singer who is represented by and signed to Awakening Records. He released his debut album Salawat in 2004, which was produced and arranged by British composer and vocalist Sami Yusuf. Kurtis went on to release other albums such as Beloved, Tabassam, Balaghal Ula, and one mini album Azeem Al-Shan.

== Background and education ==
Kurtis was born in Skopje, North Macedonia to Turkish parents. He studied at the College of Skopje and came to the UK at a young age to pursue his studies. He graduated with a degree in Human Sciences, Islamic Law and Jurisprudence from the European Institute of Human Sciences, University of Wales.

Kurtis comes from a scholarly and religious family. His father and grandfather were fluent in Classical Arabic.

== Career ==
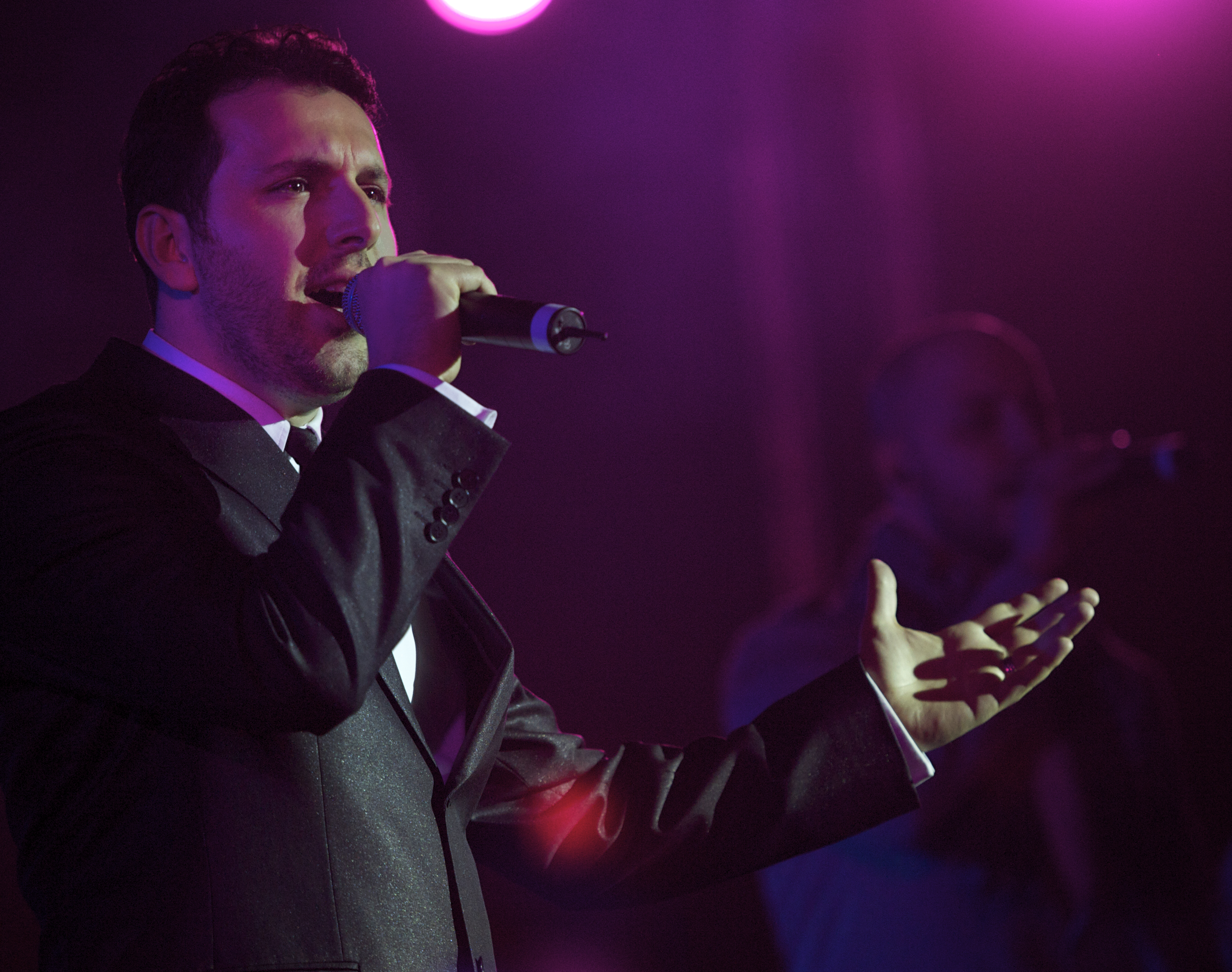
Kurtis at a concert in Konya, Turkey in 2014

Kurtis showed a strong interest in Islamic nasheeds from a very young age. He joined several nasheed groups in Macedonia that performed local and also made several international visits including performances in Turkey and neighbouring places. His music is influenced by Sufi, Turkish classical, Arabic and European styles.

In May 2004, his debut album Salawat, produced by Awakening Records, was released and featured songs that combine Arabic, Turkish and English. It was well received by Muslim listeners around the world after his first music video "Al‐Burdah" which was filmed on location in the islands off the coast of Turkey.

In June 2009, his second album Beloved was released. On 7 July 2014, his third album Tabassam was released.

Kurtis sings in Arabic, English, Macedonian and Turkish. He is also fluent in five languages.

== Philanthropy ==
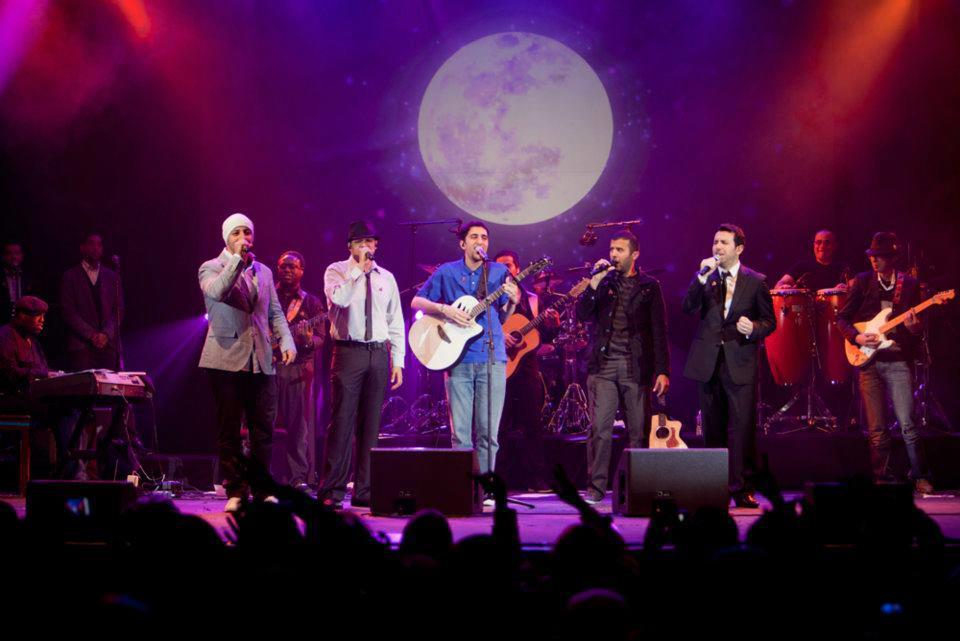
(From left) Maher Zain, Irfan Makki, Raef, Hamza Namira, Mesut Kurtis in "Send a little hope" UK tour in London in April 2012

- On 14 April 2012, Kurtis took part in "Send A Little Hope" charity concert organised by Awakening Records and Save An Orphan organization at London's Hammersmith Apollo with Hamza Namira, Irfan Makki, Maher Zain and Raef to raise awareness and collect donations. Over £175,000 were pledged on the night.
- On 21 April 2012, Kurtis performed at University City Hall by Sharjah City for Humanitarian Services in collaboration with the American University of Sharjah with Maher Zain in the charity concert aiming at introducing youth to disability issues and emphasising the importance of voluntarily work.
- Kurtis took part in "Sound of Light 2014" tour organized by Awakening Records and Human Appeal International in France and UK to collect fund for Gaza. A concert in Bradford, England raised £520,000.

== Discography ==
=== Albums ===
Album	Title	Album details
1	Salawat	Released:1 May 2004; Labels: Awakening Records; Formats: CD, Cassettes, Digital Downloads; Featured artists: Sami Yusuf
2	Beloved	Released: 25 June 2009; Label: Awakening Records; Formats: CD, Digital Download
3	Tabassam	Released: 7 July 2014; Label: Awakening Records; Formats: CD, Digital Downloads
4	Balaghal Ula	Released: 24 May 2019; Label: Awakening Records; Formats: Digital Downloads

=== Mini album ===
Title	Album details
Azeem AlShan	Released: 2021; Label: Awakening Records; Formats: Digital Download; Total Tracks: 5 tracks

== Videography ==
- 2019: "Balaghal Ula"
- 2014: "Aşkınla Yansın Özüm"
- 2014: "Rouhi Fidak"
- 2012: "Sevgili"
- 2009: "Beloved"
- 2007: "Burdah"
- 2022: "Hasbi Rabbi"
- 2022: "Burdah" Remake
- 2023: "Ya Habibi Ya Muhammad" ft. Malek Noor

== See also ==
- Maher Zain
- Hamza Namira
- Raef
- Humood Alkhudher
