= Aseer Ahsan =

Studio album by Humood AlKhudher
- Released: 2015
- Recorded: 2014–2015
- Genres: Arabic pop, nasheed
- Label: Awakening Records (World)
- Producers: Humood Alkhudher, Bara Kherigi

Humood AlKhudher chronology
Fekra (2013)	Aseer Ahsan (2015)

Singles from Aseer Ahsan
- 1. "Kun Anta" Released: February 2, 2016; 2. "Ha Anatha" Released: April 8, 2016

Aseer Ahsan (in Arabic أصير أحسن) is a 2015 album by Humood AlKhudher, released on Awakening Records. Just after being released, the album made the top selling list in iTunes Gulf and saved its 10th place in the Billboard for the World Music Albums.

== Music videos ==
- Humood's debut track from the item, titled "Kun Anta" (in Arabic كن أنت), was launched accompanied by a music video which had 200 million views on YouTube and was top selling release on iTunes Malaysia. A special Indonesian version of the song, entitled "Jadi Diri Sendiri", was also released.
- The follow-up single from the album was "Ha Anatha" (in Arabic هأنذا) also accompanied by a music video.

== Track list ==
No.	Title	Writer(s)	Length
1.	"Edhak"	Zaid Mudhy	3:09
2.	"Aseer Ahsan"	Saif Fadhel	4:05
3.	"Lughat Al-Alam"	Saif Fadhel	4:36
4.	"Khallah"	Saif Fadhel	4:09
5.	"Ha Anatha"	Saif Fadhel	3:57
6.	"Ain"	Saif Fadhel	3:32
7.	"Kun Anta"	Saif Fadhel	3:56
8.	"La'alla Khair"	Saif Fadhel	4:13
9.	"Nafsha"	Saif Fadhel	3:57
10.	"Qissat Al-Oshaq"	Saif Fadhel	3:45
