= Mouled Sidi El-Latini =

Studio album by Eftekasat
- Released: 2006
- Recorded: April–June 2006
- Genre: Oriental Jazz
- Length: 59:21
- Label: Incognito
- Producer: Darryl John Kennedy

Mouled Sidi El-Latini (Arabic: مولد سيدى اللاتينى) which means The Latin Dervish is Eftekasat's debut album. It was released in 2006. It is an instrumental album which fuses Jazz with oriental influences and a little progressive rock.

== Track listing ==
All songs were written by Amro Salah, except where noted.

1. "Anxious Dance" - 5:19
2. "Titre" - 6:36
3. "Duck Tears" (Ousso) - 6:37
4. "Mouled Sidi El-Latini" - 5:24
5. "Eftekasat" - 6:08
6. "Sabr" - 6:09
7. "Faction" (Ousso) - 3:40
8. "La Belle Algerie" - 4:50
9. "Rosava Dolina" - 6:02
10. "Nekriz Necrosis" - 4:01
11. "Morning Chant" (Ousso) - 4:41

== Influence on Egyptian music ==
Being one of the first professional Egyptian bands, Eftekasat's debut album upon its release made quite a fuss that many magazines and newspapers, which only covered Egyptian pop music, started to write about Eftekasat and their album. Eftekasat, together with other bands, the most notable of which is Wust El Balad, started a musical revolution in Egypt as people started to notice the 'bands' music more. The album generally, and the track "Mouled Sidi El-Latini" specifically, made quite an impact that fans of pop music were impressed. Eftekasat reached as far as having their tracks played on radios which was quite an impossibility for bands in Egypt.

== Trivia ==
- Salah and Khairy share the belief that musical variety is a necessity;

"no human can listen to one type of music, you'll end up getting bored! You can't listen to Om Kalthoum for a whole day or week, nor to Eftekasat! The media should show the audience what is there and present the varied option"

The band's logo which spells the band's name in English and Arabic support that together with the multilingual tracks on which Salah commented:

"Eftekasat is an international band, for many reasons; we are aiming towards a position in the international music scene because we play music that is influenced by different cultures."

Eftekasat are indeed now considered to be an international band due to their participation in the Carthage Jazz Festival 2008 in Tunis.

- Anxious dance is the oldest Eftekasat track composed back in 1992 with the original name of "Anxiety".
- Titre is the opening music of Mo'taz EL Demerdash's talk show.
- "Duck Tears" was inspired by a vision an ill, mind blurred and drugged 17-year-old Ousso. This is what he saw:

"I was playing my guitar in a garden and there were ducks. I could hear the music in my vision. The ducks were dancing to the music. The weather was great and there were birds in the skies. Suddenly, the skies turned grey and the ducks started to march very seriously, then the clouds turned red, a storm blew and the ducks started dying and then i fell to the ground. All of a sudden, things started to brighten up again and the ducks started playing once more and the vision went on looping in my mind many times."

- Mouled Sidi El-Latini, Eftekasat's most popular track, was composed back in 1998. Salah wrote the track after imagining a celebration in Latin America joined later by eastern musicians with some special instruments. Blending the two together produced the effect of a "trance state of a mouled". A mouled is a historical celebration of an honorable religious character.
- "Mouled Sidi El-Latini" contains the only word on the album; "hay" "حى" which means alive.
- "Sabr" "صبر" means patience.
- Faction is supposed "to represent the endless struggles between different political and religious leanings."
- Le Belle Algerie was influenced by El-hajj Mohamed El Anka; a great figure of folkloric music in Algeria.
- "Rosova Dolina" means "the valley of roses" in Bulgarian composed about a special place Salah visited in Bulgaria.
- "Nekriz Necrosis" is based on the Nekriz musical scale but eventually drifts from it and that's where the word "Necrosis" comes from, a medical expression that means sudden death of cells.

== Credits ==
- Amro Salah - Piano, Synths
- Samer George - Bass
- Amro Khairy “The Mestar” - Drums
- Mohamad Medhat - Violin
- Ousso - Guitars
- Hany Badry - Nay
- Hany Bedair - Percussion
- Amr Yehia - Sound Engineer
- Alaa El Kashef - Sound Engineer
- Graphic design: h|m|d studio - (Hani Mahfouz & Ahmed Foula)
