= Speed Caravan =

Algerian Musician

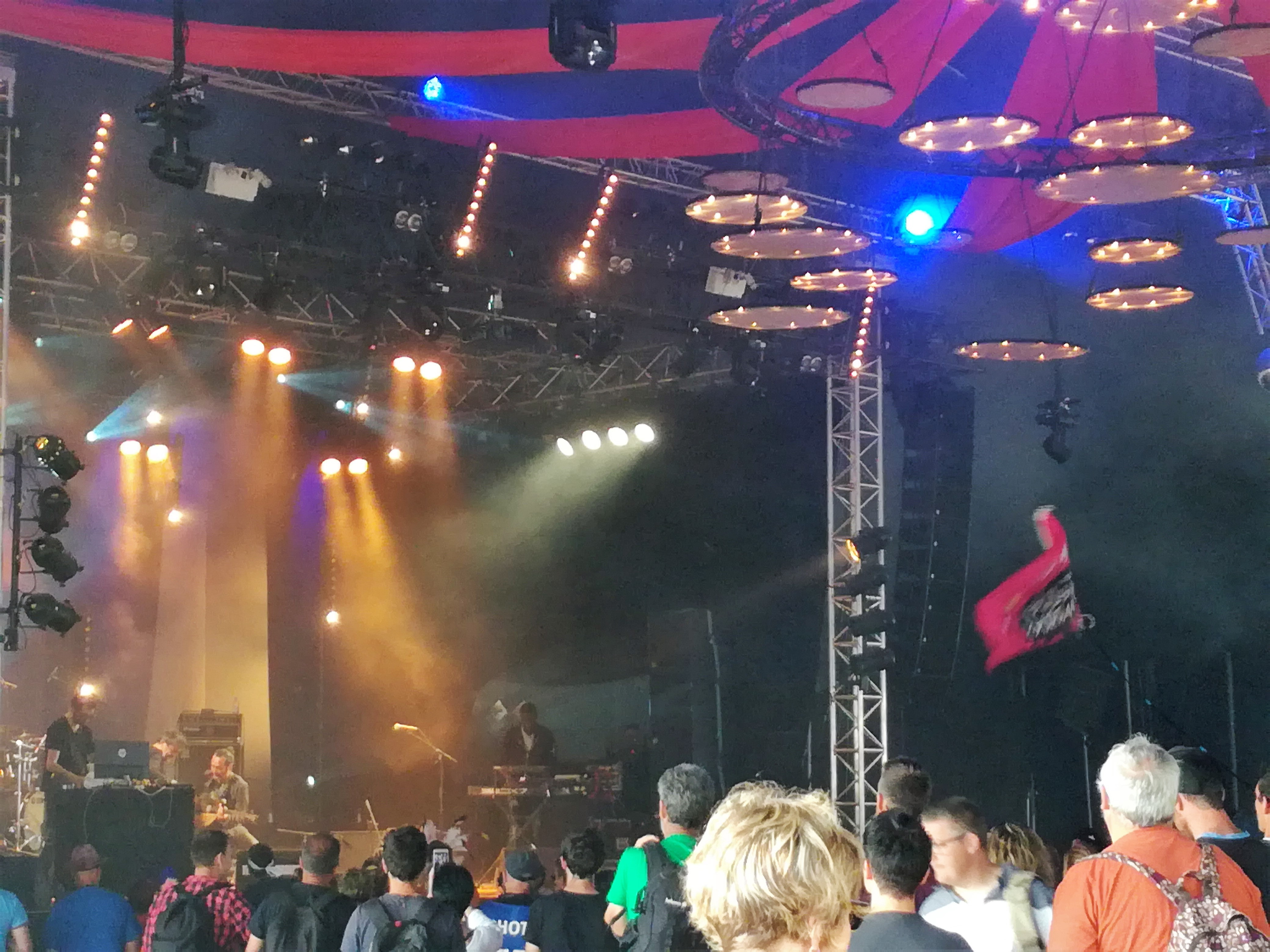
- Speed Caravan appearing at the Festival des Vieilles Charrues 2017.

Background information
- Origin: France, Algeria
- Genres: Folk, indie rock, Folktronica
- Years active: 2005–present
- Label: Buda Musique (current)
- Members: Mehdi Haddab – electric oud; Pascal « Pasco » Teillet – bass; Hermione Franck – keyboards; Mohamed Bouamar – percussion

Speed Caravan is a World music band from France and Algeria. Their music combines Ma'luf, Folktronica and Rock amongst others.

== History ==
The band was founded in 2005 by half-Algerian half-French Oud-player Mehdi Haddab and bass player Pascal « Pasco » Teillet. The band was later on supplemented by keyboard player Hermione Frank – who already played with Mehdi Haddab in the Band Ekova.

About founding and naming the band, Mehdi Haddab said in 2008:

At the beginning, I decided to create this trio with Pascal Teillet and Hermione Frank to have a repertoire . It was three years ago and it corresponds to the moment when I started systematically playing the electric lute... At that time, with Pasco we saw each other several evenings a week, we sometimes worked until nine in the morning, we were partying, we were making music… We spend a year like that and we built something in this whirlwind of creation.... »

During that time, Speed Caravan played gigs at the festival Solidays in 2006 and 2007.

Speed Caravan released their debut album Kalashnik Love in 2008, cooperating with various artists such as MC Spex from Asian Dub Foundation, Rachid Taha und Rodolphe Burger. The album includes two cover versions, namely Galvanize from the Chemical Brothers and Killing an Arab from The Cure, the latter dealing with the plot of the novel The Stranger from Albert Camus. The band appeared on the festival Fnac Indétendances in the Paris Plage as a support act of Keziah Jones.

The second album Big Blue Desert from 2016 is a hommage to Jeff Beck and Jimmy Page, who made a deep impression on Mehdi Haddab during the latter's childhood. Tours corresponding to that album lead the band all the way to the festival The Spirit of Tengri in Almaty in Kazakhstan in 2017.

Speed Caravan's third album Nuba Nova was recorded in 2020 together with Hamdi Benani, who took over the vocals. As the name of that album may suggest, the music is a Folktronic interpretation of Andalusi nubah. Hamdi Benani did not live to see the release of the album in June 2021, so that the album may partially be seen as an obituary to the white angel, who had been present in the Algerian music scene for decades.

== Discography ==
- 2008: Kalashnik Love, (Newbled Records)
- 2016: Big Blue Desert, (World Village)
- 2021: Nuba Nova, (Buda Musique)
