= Hamza Robertson =

- Born: Tom Robertson; January 29, 1982 (age 44); Chadderton, Oldham, Greater Manchester, England
- Origin: Oldham, Greater Manchester England
- Genres: Islamic; nasheed; rock
- Occupation: Singer
- Instruments: Vocals; keyboard; guitar; piano
- Years active: 2007–present
- Labels: Awakening; Andante Records; Rotana Records

Hamza Robertson (Arabic: حمزة روبرتسون; born Tom Robertson) is an English singer who is signed to and managed by Andante Records.

== Early life ==
Tom Robertson was born in Chadderton, Greater Manchester, England, he was brought up in a Christian family environment. From an early age, he involved himself in music and the performing arts. He was a part of the local theatre workshop, where he wrote music and acted in plays. He took part in bands beyond college, playing instruments and writing music.

He studied performing arts and popular music for three years until the age of 20.

== Career ==
In 2003, at the age of 21, Robertson converted to Islam and adopted the name Hamza.

In November 2006, he performed at the Global Peace and Unity Event in ExCeL Exhibition Centre in London organised by Islam Channel.

In July 2007, Robertson released his first album Something About Life, by Awakening Records.

In 2013, he worked with the renowned artist Sami Yusuf under Andante records. His music reached millions of views on YouTube.

Robertson has recently gone back to his roots and has formed the rock band Yesterday's Child.

== Discography ==
=== Albums ===
Title	Album details
Something About Life	Released: 3 July 2007; Label: Awakening Music; Formats: CD, digital download

== See also ==
- Islamic music
- Nasheed
- List of converts to Islam
