= Nazeel Azami =

English singer

Nazeel Azami নাজিল আজামি
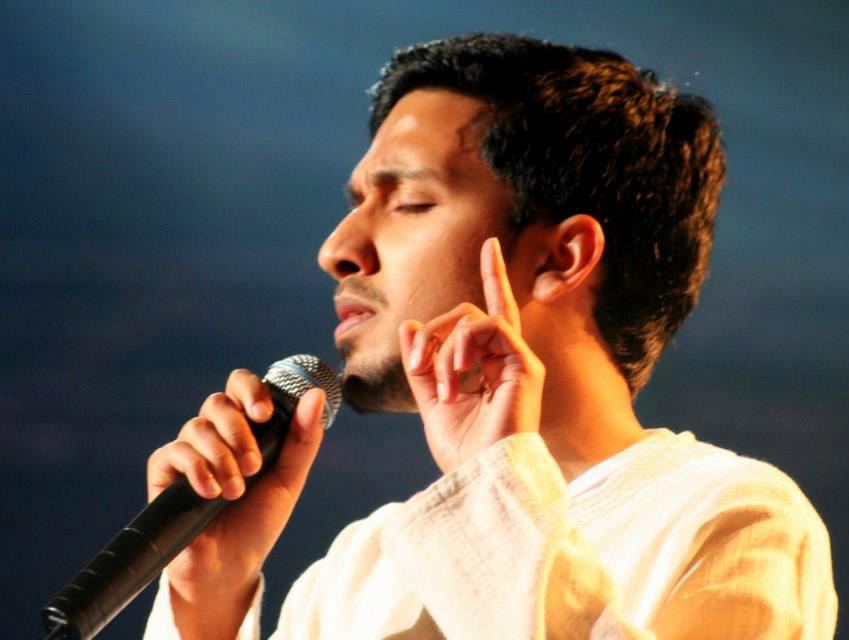
- Azami in 2005

Background information
- Born: Manchester, England
- Origin: London, England
- Genres: Traditional; hamd; world music; nasheed
- Occupation: Singer
- Years active: 2006–2015
- Labels: Awakening; UMA Global
- Website: nazeelazami.com

Nazeel Azami (Bengali: নাজিল আজামি;) is an English singer.

== Early life ==
Azami is of Bangladeshi descent. He went to a primary school in London, secondary schools in three countries, and graduated with a BSc in Physics with Business and Management, and PGCE from the University of Manchester.

Azami developed his music talent at a very young age after his mother encouraged him to memorise and recite spiritual poetry and songs, old and new. He was further influenced by his maternal uncle who was also a singer-songwriter and poet.

== Career ==
In September 2006, Azami's debut album Dunya was released by Awakening Records. The album combined different languages, themes and cultures. Previously he had featured as a backing vocalist on Sami Yusuf's first album, Al-Muʽallim. He sings in a number of languages, including English, Bengali, Arabic and Urdu.

In November 2006, he performed at the Global Peace and Unity Event at the ExCeL Exhibition Centre in London.

In 2013, after taking a five-year hiatus, Azami is due to return with a new music video and album under British record label UMA Global. In July 2014, his single "Allahu" was released. In August 2014, he was interviewed by Sunny and Shay Grewal on BBC London 94.9. In July 2014, he performed at Eid in the Square.

== Discography ==
=== Singles ===
Year	Single	Chart positions	Album
2014	"Allahu"		

=== Albums ===
Title	Album details	Chart positions	Certifications
Dunya	Released: 1 September 2006; Label: Awakening Records; Formats: CD, Digital Download		

== See also ==
- British Bangladeshis
- List of British Bangladeshis
- Bengali music
- Arabic music
- Islamic music
- Nasheed
