= Hamza Namira =

Egyptian singer, songwriter, and music producer

Hamza Namira حمزة نمرة
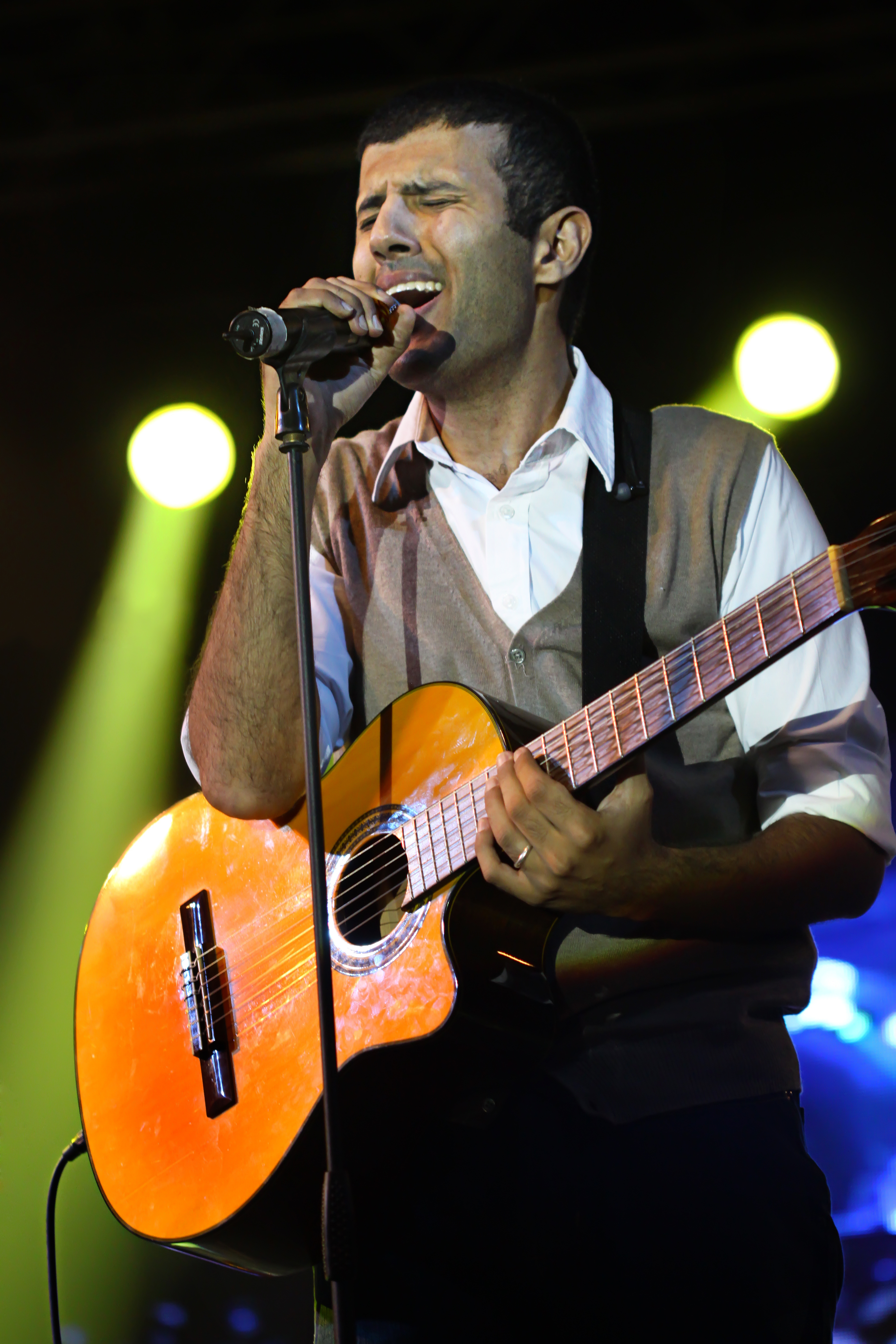
- Namira performing at a concert in 2010

Background information
- Born: Hamza Namira; 1980 (age 45–46); Diriyah, Saudi Arabia
- Origin: Egypt
- Genres: Egyptian music; pop; Revolution music
- Occupations: Singer; composer; Songwriter; music producer; Music arranger; Actor
- Instruments: Vocals; guitar; Oud
- Years active: 1999–present
- Labels: Awakening; Namira Productions
- Website: hamzanamira.net

Hamza Namira (Arabic: حمزة نمرة) is an Egyptian singer-songwriter and multi-instrumentalist. He has released three albums from the production of Awakening Records: Dream With Me, Insan, Esmaani; and a couple of albums from Namira production, his own foundation: Hateer Min Tany and Mawlood Sanat 80. Besides singing, for which he is mostly known, he has also worked in musical composition and arrangement. Hamza composed some of his own work, like the album heads Esmaani and Insan, along with some collaborations with other artists, like Maher Zain's song Ya Nabi Salam Alayka. He also contributed to arranging the cartoony remake Egyptian Jingle Bells (also known as Oh la la song), which was the first shaabi work in his repertoire, later followed by Esta3izo in his fourth studio album.

Hamza's work is mostly marked by a recurring sociopolitical theme, diverting from love songs and focusing on topics of general humanist interest, like hope, alienation, generational change, and oppression. He's also interested in reviving cultural heritage. Having been dubbed "Voice of the Revolution", works of Hamza rose to prominence during the 25 January revolution, in which he personally participated, and was considered a symbolic figure thereof. Dari Ya Alby, from his third album, topped the SoundCloud chart for almost a month.

== Career ==
=== Beginnings ===
Namira started to develop an interest in music when he was 17 years old, when he set about learning the guitar, keyboard, and ‘oud. He also vested interests in several musical styles: Middle Eastern, Egyptian traditional and folk music, light rock, jazz, and Latin music. From 1999 until 2004, Namira played in a band headed by the Alexandrian artist Nabil Bakly. Although a relatively unknown musician, Namira later said that Bakly was his main musical influence. He then went on to form his own group. Namira composed his first songs and managed to get a few like-minded friends together to establish the band "Nomaira". In the meantime, he studied commerce at the Alexandria University and graduated in 2003.

In light of Namira's debut album, which had a main fan base of college students, one commentator described him as the "new Sayed Darwish", a cover of whose song, Shedd El Hizam, was released in the album.

=== Breakthrough success ===
Namira's second album, Insan [Human] was released in July 2011. This coincided with the Arab spring, which he declared was a main factor in his popularity. According to him, he wants to express the real issues of his generation that mainstream works don't cover due to concerns of musical market needs and pressure from production companies.

When British Prime Minister David Cameron visited Egypt on 21 February 2011 (only ten days after President Hosni Mubarak left office), Namira was one of a select group of people invited to meet with him and to participate in a one-hour discussion about the future of Egypt.

Namira's fixation on sociopolitical issues continued along the timeline of the Egyptian part of the Arab Spring. In January 2014, he released a single, Wa Ollak Eh, in which he emphasized on rejecting violence, hatred, and the general polarized environment following the 2013 Egyptian coup d'état and Rabia massacre.

=== Remix series ===
In 2016, Namira launched his own weekly TV series Remix (Arabic: ريمكس) on the pan-Arab TV channel Al Araby. As of 24 December 2020, 3 seasons of the show were released, with a total number of 34 episodes. Along the series, Namira blended different music genres with local lyrics, including flamenco, electro, celtic, and others. Arabic lyrics were adopted from the Maghreb, the levant, Egypt, and Saudi Arabia, while non-Arab included Amazigh, Kurdish, and Armenian.

With a running time of around 20–30 minutes, each episode would examine the historical origin and evolution of a work of folklore or pop culture in an Arab region, or sometimes in even other neighboring regions, like Armenia and Kurdistan. In exploration of the musical piece, Namira would interview original artists (if still alive), their family members, local enthusiasts, or cultural officials. For example, he met with Hamdi Benani for an Algerian cover, and with the grandparent of Sayed Darwish for a remake of his Yā Wild ʿammy (Arabic: يا ولد عمي, lit. 'O, cousin'). At the end of each episode, Hamza would publicly perform a remix of the work, usually outside its place of origin or popularity. A number of songs were performed in London, which is both the headquarter of Al Araby and Hamza's place of residence. Works of Remix were mostly collaborative, featuring Lowkey, Babylone, Isam Bachiri, Hamid Al Shaeri, among others.

== Discography ==
=== Albums ===
==== Studio albums ====
Year	Title	Label	Track list
2008	Ehlam Maaya (Dream With Me)	Awakening Records	1. Morgiha – A Swing; 2. Ehlam Ma'aya – Dream With Me; 3. Konna Wehna Soghar – When We Were Young; 4. Fattah Shababeek 'Eeeneik – Spread out Your Eyes; 5. Shedd El Hizam – Tighten Up Your Belt; 6. Ya Tair – O' Bird; 7. Wana Fi Tareeqy – While On My Way; 8. Al Taghreeba – Alienation; 9. Ya Rabb – O' Lord; 10. Ehlam Ma'aya (Acoustic Version) – Dream With Me
2011	Insan (A Human)	Awakening Records	1. Insan – A Human; 2. El-Midan – The Square; 3. Hansa – I'll Forget; 4. Taghreeba II – Alienation 2; 5. Ya Muhawwin – O' Consoler; 6. Ewidooni – Promise Me; 7. Ibn El-Watan – Compatriot; 8. Balady Ya Balady – Homeland, O' Homeland; 9. Ya Hanah! – Lucky him!; 10. Doori – Roll on 11. Haser Hesarak – Besiege Your Siege; 12. Ala Bab Allah – By Allah's Door; 13. Wushoosh – Faces; 14. Sout – A Voice; 15. Hila Hila Ya Matar – Come Down O' Rain!; 16. Esmy Masr – My Name's Egypt
2014	Esmaani (Listen Up)	Awakening Records	1. Esmaani – Listen Up!; 2. Sabah El-Kheer – Good Morning; 3. Ya Lala; 4. Ay Kalam – Empty Words; 5. Dalmet kda leeh – Why The Darkness?; 6. El-Atr – The Train; 7. Tesmahy- Would You?; 8. Ya Sidi – My Master; 9. La Tabki – Don't Cry; 10. Kollo Beya'addi – It All Pass; 11. Ya Mazloum – O' Oppressed One; 12. Ma'Assalama – Farewell (Alienation 3)
2018	Hateer Min Tany (I'll Fly Again)	Namira	1. Dari Ya Alby – Dissemble, My Heart; 2. Sheekayyo; 3. Hateer Min Tany – I'll fly again 4. Wala Sohba Ahla – Not a Better Company; 5. Bos Bos – Look, Look!; 6. Zahra; 7. El Wad El Abeet – The Naive Boy; 8. Dari Ya Alby (acoustic); 9. Madadd – Help!; 10. Shuwayyet Habayeb – Some Dears
2020	Mawlood Sanat 80 (Born in the Year 80)	Namira	1. Mawlood Sanat 80 – Born in the Year 80; 2. El Waqaa El Akheera – The Last Fall; 3. Esta'eezo – Seek refuge 4. El Saa'a 6 Sabahan – 6 in the Morning; 5. Faady Shuwayya – A Bit Idle; 6. Mesh Mohem – Doesn't Matter; 7. Yaaba – Buddy; 8. Ahkeelak Khofy – Tell You About My Fear; 9. Ma'lesh – Sorry; 10. El Essa W Elli Kaan – The Story and How it Went; 11. Ghenwa Leek Min Alby – A Song From The Heart To You; 12. Feeh Naas – There's People

==== Remix ====
Season (Year)	Release date	Track	English translation	Collaborator(s)	Fused genre	Original Work
Season 1 (2016)	15 April	Inas Inas (4:56)	Tell him, Tell him	Reminisce Reggae Band	Reggae	Mohamed Rouicha (Morocco, Amazighi folklore)
Season 1 (2016)	21 April	Wa Sari Sara El Leil/Wein a Ramallah (5:46/1:20)	Oh, the Night Went By/Where? To Ramallah	Tarek an Nasser and Rum band	Arabic pop	Jordanian/Palestinian folklore/Salwa Al-Aas
Season 1 (2016)	28 April	Ya Zareef Al Tool (5:05)	O' Statuesque	47Soul	Shamstep	Palestinian folklore (Dabke)
Season 1 (2016)	5 May	Ya Oud Al Rouman (3:41)	O' Trunk of Pomegranate	Baraka	African music	Fata Najran (Saudi folklore)
Season 1 (2016)	12 May	Ya Nes Jaratli Gharaeeb (5:50)	Wonders Befell Me, O' People!	Zap Tharwat, Omar Sammur, and Ben Eaton	hip-hop music	Hamdi Benani (Tunisian/Algerian Ma'luf)
Season 1 (2016)	19 May	Mal Almagadir (4:29)	What's With the Goings?	Nour Project	smooth jazz	Ahmed Munib; Katkot Elamir (Nubian folklore; Egyptian Shaabi)
Season 1 (2016)	26 May	Manich Mena (4:25)	I Don't Belong Here	AlQoura	funk music	Algerian/Moroccan folklore; Reggada
Season 1 (2016)	2 June	Salma Ya Salama/Raggle Taggle Gypsy (4:23)	Farewell O' Salama	Wraggle Taggle Band	Irish music	Sayed Darwish (Egyptian Zajal)
Season 1 (2016)	7 July	Wain Ayamak Wain (2:44)	Long Since Your Time	Hamid Al Shaeri	electro music	(Libyan folklore)
Season 1 (2016)	14 July	Ya Bahr El Toufan (4:13)	O' Floody Sea	Valkania	Balkan Music	Boudjemaâ El Ankis, Mohamed El Badji (Algerian Chaabi)
Season 1 (2016)	21 July	Jaljal Alayya Al Romman (4:47)	Pomegranate Enshadows Me	Ian Burdge, Chris Worsey, and Simon Hale	Classical music	Iraqi folklore
Season 1 (2016)	28 July	Yawman Toatebna (4:05)	We Once Gave Reproof	Ramon Ruiz and Manuel de la Niña	Flamenco	Port-Saidi folklore (Simsimiyya)
Season 2 (2018)	28 September	Khlili (3:45)	My Beloved	Génération Taragalte	Tuareg music	Lemchaheb (Berber music)
Season 2 (2018)	5 October	Yamma Mwel El Hawa (3:04)	What's with the Longing, Mother?	Frankly Jazz	Jazz music	Palestinian folklore
Season 2 (2018)	12 October	Dar Ya Dar (4:17)	Home, Oh Home	Eftekasat	World fusion	Wadih El Safi(Lebanon)
Season 2 (2018)	26 October	Siniya (3:23)	Dining Table	Autostrad	Alternative rock	Nass El Ghiwane (Moroccan chaabi & folklore)
Season 2 (2018)	2 November	Ya Tair Ya Tayer (3:28)	O' Soaring Bird	Balkanatics	Balkan music	Ismail Khidr; Jamil AlAas (Jordanian folklore)
Season 2 (2018)	9 November	Gmar El Ghorba (4:11)	Moon of Alienation	Artmasta	Reggaeton	Walid Tounsi (Tunisian chaabi)
Season 2 (2018)	16 November	Ayoub wu Na'saa (4:56)	Ayoub and Na'saa	Aytac Dogan	World music	Khadra Mohamed Khidr (Egyptian folklore)
Season 2 (2018)	23 November	Ya Yomma Fe Dag 'Aa Babna (3:44)	The Door's Knocking, Mother	Smith & Sons	Bluegrass music	Abu Arab (Palestinian folklore)
Season 2 (2018)	30 November	Tunisian Hadrah (Al Burdah) (3:34)	The Mantle	Emre Moğulkoç	Sufi music	Sufi Nasheed
Season 2 (2018)	7 December	Ya Zare'e El Bazringosh (3:31)	O' Cultivator of Bazringosh	Declan Zapala	Classical music	Iraqi folklore
Season 2 (2018)	14 December	'Aytat L'ammala (3:35)	The Prefectural Lament	Habib Belk	Gnawa music	Moroccan Aita
Season 2 (2018)	21 December	Nazani (3:03)	Graceful	Dante Ferrara	Classical music	Նազանի by Sayat-Nova (Armenian folklore)
Season 2 (2018)	29 December	Erdi 'Alina Ya Lmeema (3:43)	Be Pleased With Us, Mother	8-Ball band	Indie rock	Salah Farzit (Tunisian chaabi)

==== Extended plays ====
Year	Title	Track list
2015	El Mesaharaty (Suhur waker)	1. Zeina; 2. Zahma – Jam; 3. Ghorba – Alienation; 4. Kora – Football; 5. Helal – Crescent; 6. Manish Darwish – I'm no Dervish; 7. Wasfa – Recipe; 8. Iblees – Lucifer; 9. Nabina – Our Prophet; 10. Taraweeh – Tarawih; 11. El Omm – Mother; 12. Napoleon; 13. Khatma – A Complete Recitation; 14. Intizar – Waiting; 15. Istighfar; 16. Akher 10 Ayam – The Last 10 Days; 17. Daqqet Tabla – Beat of Drums; 18. Leilet AlQadr – Qadr Night; 19. Akher Leila – The Last Night

=== Singles ===
Year	Release date	Title
2009	22 December	Asforein – Two Birds
2011	21 October	Lessa El'adl Gheyab – Justice Still Lacking (live)
2012	26 July	Betheb Haga – You Love Something (Soundtrack of Sehr El Dunia by Mustafa Hosny)
2012	1 August	Kun 'Awna – Be of Help (Soundtrack of Khawatir by Ahmad Al Shugairi)
2013	14 June	Soundtrack of Bekhtesar (In short) TV show by Moataz Abdelfatah
2014	21 January	Wa Ollak Eh – What to Tell You
2019	8 February	Hekayet Tefl – A kid's story
2020	15 October	Ft. in Emlaq (Giant) with Hassan El Shafei

== Videography ==
Year	Title
2008	Dream with Me (Ehlam Ma'aya)
2009	Two Birds (Asforeen)
2010	O Israel (Ya Israeel); I'm the Egyptian (Ana El-Masri)
2011	Human (Insan); Hila Hila ya Matar (Come Down O' Rain); Mawaweel
2013	The Square (El-Midan, in Arabic الميدان)
2014	What to Tell You (Wa Ollak Eih, in Arabic وقلّك إيه)
2018	Dary ya Alby
2019	Hekayet Tefl (meaning a kid's story, in Arabic حكاية طفل)
2020	Mawlood sanat 80 (in Arabic مولود سنة 80)
2020	Esta3izo (in Arabic استعيذوا)

== Political views ==
Hamza has openly opposed the occupation of Palestine and the official position in Egypt towards the Arab–Israeli conflict. He was also a vocal proponent of the Arab spring, naming El Midan after Tahrir Square, due to its role in the Egyptian revolution, and dedicating his Hila Hila Ya Matar for the Jasmine Revolution in Tunisia. Namira also dedicated his Hekayet Tefl for the children of Syrian refugees.

In November 2014, Namira's songs were banned from Egyptian state radio for "criticising the authorities". In response to questions about the ban and his legal status in Egypt, Hamza declared that he only expresses his opinions as per rights included in the Egyptian constitution, and that he doesn't identify as an activist, nor a politician.

In an interview with Youm7, Namira emphasized that he doesn't affiliate with the Muslim Brotherhood organization. He expressed his support for the Egyptian Military in the Sinai insurgency and expressed condolences for Ahmed Mansi, an Egyptian colonel killed during a terrorist attack.

He finally returned to settle and resume concerts in Egypt in September 2022 after spending years in exile.

== Philanthropy ==
Namira joined a two-day UK tour organized by Human Appeal International to fundraise for medical equipment and provide training for more than 10,000 medical practitioners in Egypt. He performed in Vienna, Austria in October 2014 in an event organized by Humanic Relief.

In 2019, Namira released Hekayet Tefl in collaboration with United Muslim Relief as part of a fundraiser to support children of refugees of the Syrian Civil War in Jordan. The campaign raised around £E90,000.
