= Hamdi Benani =

Algerian singer and musician (1943–2020)

- Born: 1 January 1943; Annaba, French Algeria
- Died: 21 September 2020 (aged 77); Annaba, Algeria
- Occupation(s): Singer, musician

Hamdi Benani (Arabic: حمدي بناني; 1 January 1943 – 21 September 2020) was an Algerian singer and musician.

== Biography ==
Benani was born in Annaba in 1943. His uncle, M'hamed El Kourd, encouraged him to start singing because of the quality of his voice and interpretive ability. He won his first prize while singing at the age of 16.

He first gained notoriety in 1963 with the song Ya Bahi El Djamel, which drove him to pursue a career in singing and violin. He brought new life to the Malouf genre of music with the tracks Mahbounati and Adala Ya Adala, which earned him great public success. This helped him be noticed by senior members of the Malouf singing community, such as Hassen El Annabi, Mohamed Tahar Fergani, and Abdelmoumène Bentobal.

Benani was nicknamed "l'ange blanc" (The White Angel) because he was always seen in a white suit with his white violin. He helped modernize the Malouf genre by using ancestral themes alongside modern instruments and new themes in the texts.

Benani's final work was a cooperation with Folktronica band Speed Caravan on recording their third album Nuba Nova in 2020.

== Death ==
Hamdi Benani died from COVID-19 in Annaba on 21 September 2020, aged 77, during the COVID-19 pandemic in Algeria.
