= Forgive Me (Maher Zain album) =

Studio album by Maher Zain
- Released: 1 April 2012
- Recorded: 2010–2012
- Genre: Religious, contemporary Islamic music, soul, pop, Middle East pop, adult contemporary, international
- Label: Awakening
- Producer: Maher Zain, Bara Kherigi

Maher Zain chronology
| Thank You Allah (2009) | Forgive Me (2012) | One (2016) |

Singles from Forgive Me
- 1. "Freedom" Released: March 27, 2011; 2. "Number One For Me" Released: March 13, 2012; 3. "So Soon" Released: June 3, 2012; 4. "Muhammad (pbuh)" Released: January 10, 2014

Forgive Me is the second studio album by Swedish singer-songwriter Maher Zain and was released on April 1, 2012, by Awakening Records. The album was a commercial success; it sold over 100,000 copies and went seven-times Platinum in Malaysia as of June 2016.

== Music videos ==
- The first music video from the album was for the song "Freedom". It was released on March 27, 2011, by Malaysian director Mohd Hafizi bin Mat Khalib. The music video was filmed on February 25 & 26, 2011, at Malawati Stadium, Malaysia.
- The second music video from the album was for the song "Number One For Me". It was released on March 15, 2012. The video was directed by Mike Harris, who had previously directed "Insha Allah" from the album Thank You Allah. The "Number One For Me" music video was released via iTunes on March 13, 2012. Performers in the video include child actor Massimo Loreti.
- The third music video entitled "So Soon", was released on June 3, 2012. It was directed by Mike Harris.
- The fourth music video was released on January 9, 2014, titled "Muhammad (pbuh)".

== Track listing ==
The full track list was announced on iTunes on April 2, 2012.

| No. | Title | Writer(s) | Length |
|---|---|---|---|
| 1. | "I Love You So" | Maher Zain, Bara Kherigi & Bilal Hajji | 4:35 |
| 2. | "Number One For Me" | Maher Zain, Bilal Hajji & Nano Omar | 4:19 |
| 3. | "Mawlaya" | Bara Kherigi & Maher Zain, Islamic Folklore | 4:50 |
| 4. | "My Little Girl" (featuring Aya Zain) | Maher Zain | 4:33 |
| 5. | "Forgive Me" | Maher Zain & Bara Kherigi | 3:40 |
| 6. | "One Big Family" | Maher Zain, Mustafa Ceceli | 4:06 |
| 7. | "Assalamu Alayka" | Maher Zain & Bara Kherigi, Emre Mogulkoc | 4:13 |
| 8. | "Paradise" | Maher Zain | 4:06 |
| 9. | "Masha Allah" | Mahmoud Farouk, Maher Zain, Hamza Namira, Emre Mogulkoc | 3:59 |
| 10. | "Radhitu Billahi Rabba" | Bara Kherigi & Maher Zain, Emre Mogulkoc | 4:56 |
| 11. | "Freedom" | Maher Zain | 3:42 |
| 12. | "So Soon" | Bara Kherigi, Maher Zain & Mohamed El-Kazaz | 5:09 |
| 13. | "Muhammad (pbuh)" | Maher Zain & Hamza Namira, Mahmoud Farouk, Mustafa Ceceli | 4:37 |
| 14. | "Guide Me All The Way" | Maher Zain | 5:02 |

Arabic bonus tracks
| No. | Title | Length |
|---|---|---|
| 15. | "Mawlaya" (Arabic version) | 4:53 |
| 16. | "Assalamu Alayka" (Arabic version) | 4:14 |
| 17. | "Radhitu Billahi Rabba" (Arabic version) | 4:59 |

Indonesia/Malaysia bonus tracks
| No. | Title | Length |
|---|---|---|
| 1. | "Ku MilikMu" | 4:29 |
| 2. | "Tuntunku KepadaMu" | 4:58 |

Turkish version bonus tracks
| No. | Title | Length |
|---|---|---|
| 1. | "Mawlaya" |
| 2. | "Selam Sana" |
| 3. | "Maşaallah" (Turkish version) |
| 4. | "Neredesin" |

Platinum Edition bonus tracks
| No. | Title | Length |
|---|---|---|
| 1. | "Insha Allah feat. Fadli "Padi"" |
| 2. | "Ramadan" (English version) |
