= I Believe (Irfan Makki album) =

Studio album by Irfan Makki
- Released: July 28, 2011
- Genre: Islamic
- Length: 53:21
- Label: Awakening

Irfan Makki chronology
Salam (2006)	I Believe (2011)

I Believe is the second studio album by the Canadian Muslim singer and songwriter Irfan Makki on Awakening Records. The album was released on July 28, 2011.

== Track listing ==
The original version of the album contains 13 tracks.

No.	Title	Length
1.	"Waiting for the Call"	5:29
2.	"Mabrook"	3:28
3.	"I Believe (feat Maher Zain)"	4:19
4.	"Lab Pae Aati"	4:12
5.	"Mamma"	4:00
6.	"Palestine"	4:07
7.	"Allahu"	3:43
8.	"You & I"	4:25
9.	"Khayal"	3:34
10.	"Al-Amin"	3:54
11.	"I'm So Sorry"	4:21
12.	"I Believe (feat Maher Zain) (Acoustic Version – Bonus Track)"	4:20
13.	"Mabrook ( Urdu Version – Bonus Track)"	3:29
Total length:		53:21

== Internet hoax ==
The song "Waiting for the Call" has been the subject of several internet hoaxes involving its authorship. These hoaxes follow a common narrative in claiming that the song was originally written by Michael Jackson and intended to raise awareness about his alleged conversion to Islam prior to his death in 2009. The song was subsequently suppressed by the U.S. government and was either leaked or its music rights bought by the Saudi government. In a 2016 tweet, Irfan Makki clarified that he is the genuine author of "Waiting for the Call" and that Michael Jackson had no connection to the track:

Makki, Irfan [@IrfanMakki_awk] (June 27, 2016). "Sunny u r funny. I wrote n sang Waiting for the call. U need to get with program 😊" (Tweet) – via Twitter.

Despite these rumors, there is no evidence to support Michael Jackson's involvement in the creation of "Waiting for the Call," nor his alleged authorship of the song. The hoax continues to circulate on the internet.
