= Celina Sharma =

Singer-songwriter

- Occupation: Singer-songwriter
- Works: CECE "24/7" ft. Harris J
- Label: +91 Records

Celina Sharma is an Australian-born singer-songwriter based in the United Kingdom. Her debut EP CECE released in 2021 features collaborations with artists such as Rich the Kid, Ivorian Doll, and Stonebwoy. Her international breakthrough hit was the song "24/7" featuring Harris J.

== Early life ==
Sharma grew up in Mosman, a suburb of Sydney. She identifies as half Indian in heritage.

She started singing at age 6. Sharma flew to Melbourne for singing lessons every other week. At age 16, she moved to the United Kingdom to further her music career.

== Career ==
Early in her career, Sharma built a following on TikTok. In 2019, Sharma was named to the BBC Asian Network Future Sounds list, and was subsequently signed with Virgin EMI Records.

By 2021, the single "Lean On", Sharma's 2019 collaboration with rapper Emiway Bantai, had reached double-platinum. She released her debut EP CECE in 2021.

One of her music videos caught the attention of director Chloé Zhao, sparking their collaboration on the soundtrack for the Marvel film Eternals. Sharma's song "Nach Mecha Hero" was criticised by many Desi fans for "not being Bollywood enough".

Her other songs have included the single "Killer", a collaboration with Girls Like You in the UK; and "Say You'll Stay". As of 2023, she was working with +91 Records.

== Discography ==
Singles
Title	Artist	Year	Peak Asian Music Chart	Peak Top 20 Aotearoa Charts	Peak AU Hip Hop/R&B
"Chalo"	Celina Sharma	2020	29		
"Her Wrongs"	Celina Sharma	2021	32		
"Nach Mecha Hero"	Celina Sharma	2021			
"Bad For You"	Celina Sharma ft. Rich the Kid	2021	39		
"Lean On"	Celina Sharma & Emiway Bantai	2021			
"Don't Worry Baby"	Stan Walker feat. Celina Sharma	2021		8	
"24/07"	Harris J & Celina Sharma	2021	13		
"44401"	Harris J & Celina Sharma	2022	30		
"Ruthless"	Hooligan Hefs feat Celina Sharma	2023			6
"Killer"	Celina Sharma & Girls Like You	2023			
"Use Me"	Not3s & Celina Sharma	2025	13 (BAMC)		
