= Awakening Music =

England-based record label

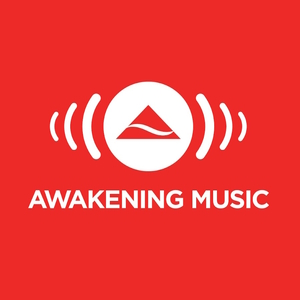
- Parent company: Deventi Group
- Founded: 2000
- Founder: Muhammad Wali-ur Rahman; Sharif H. Banna; Bara Kherigi; Wassim Malak
- Genre: Islamic, nasheed, hamd, naʽat, world music
- Country of origin: England
- Location: London, England; Cairo, Egypt; California, United States
- Official website: awakening.org

Awakening Music (previously known as Awakening Records) is an England-based record label and music production company. It was founded in 2000 by four entrepreneurs from England and the United States.It is also known for the launching the careers of Sami Yusuf, Maher Zain, Mesut Kurtis, and Harris J among others.

== Albums produced by Awakening Music ==
Year	Title	Artist(s)
2003	Al-Muʽallim	Sami Yusuf
2004	Salawat	Mesut Kurtis and Sami Yusuf
2005	My Ummah	Sami Yusuf
2006	Dunya	Nazeel Azami
2007	Something About Life	Hamza Robertson
2008	Ehlam Ma'aya	Hamza Namira
2008	One Word	Hussein Zahawy
2009	Beloved	Mesut Kurtis
2009	Thank You Allah	Maher Zain
2009	Without You	Sami Yusuf
2011	Insan	Hamza Namira
2011	I Believe	Irfan Makki
2011	Malak Ghair Allah	Mohammed Al-Hadad
2012	Forgive Me	Maher Zain
2014	The Path	Raef
2014	Tabassam	Mesut Kurtis
2014	Esmaani	Hamza Namira
2015	Aseer Ahsan	Humood AlKhudher
2015	Salam	Harris J
2015	El – Mesaharaty	Hamza Namira
2016	One	Maher Zain
2016	Remix	Hamza Namira
2019	Balaghal Ula	Mesut Kurtis
2019	Mercy	Raef
2020	Matha Ba'd?	Humood AlKhudher
2021	Azeem AlShan (EP)	Mesut Kurtis
2021	Nour Ala Nour (EP)	Maher Zain
2025	Back To You	Maher Zain

Live albums

Year	Title	Artist(s)
2014	Awakening Live at the London Apollo	Various artists (feat. Maher Zain, Mesut Kurtis, Hamza Namira, Raef & Irfan Makki)

== Artists ==
- Harris J
- Humood AlKhudher
- Maher Zain
- Mesut Kurtis
- Raef
- Jaqlyn

== Former notable artists ==
- Ali Magrebi
- Hamza Namira
- Hamza Robertson
- Irfan Makki
- Nazeel Azami
- Sami Yusuf

== Philanthropy activities ==
In 2012, Awakening Music took part in "Sound of Light" charity concerts. In 2013 and 2014, the record label helped to organise charity concerts in coordination with Islamic Relief, Human Appeal and other charity organisations around the world with the help of artists Maher Zain, Hamza Namira, Mesut Kurtis, Raef and Irfan Makki.
