= Something About Life =

Studio album by Hamza Robertson
- Released: 3 July 2007
- Genre: Islamic; Nasheed; rock
- Length: 33:56
- Language: English; Arabic
- Label: Awakening

Something About Life is the debut album by English singer Hamza Robertson, released on 3 July 2007 by Awakening Records.

== Composition ==
Something About Life blends the musical sounds of the East and West.

== Track listing ==
No.	Title	Length
1.	"Our Creation"	4:09
2.	"Your Beauty"	3:21
3.	"Show Me"	5:18
4.	"He Is One"	3:03
5.	"Morning Prayer"	3:48
6.	"My Hero"	3:11
7.	"Everyday"	3:26
8.	"The Mountain"	4:20
9.	"O Allah"	3:20
Total length:		34:56
