= Dunya (Nazeel Azami album) =

Studio album by Nazeel Azami
- Released: 1 September 2006
- Recorded: 2006
- Genre: Islamic; Arabic; Bengali; Urdu; Nasheed; hamd; na`at; World music; folk
- Length: 36:44
- Language: English; Arabic; Urdu; Bengali
- Label: Awakening

Dunya (Arabic: دُنْيا) is the debut studio album by English Nasheed singer Nazeel Azami, released on 1 September 2006 by Awakening Records.

== Composition and release ==
Dunya combines different languages, themes and cultures, and expresses pain as well as joy. The songs and recitals are retrospective thoughts on some of Azami’s personal experiences, and about life as a "seeker" aspiring to be at one with the world of God.

The album was released by Awakening Records on 1 September 2006.

== Track listing ==
No.	Title	Language(s)	Length
1.	"Opening"	Arabic	3:25
2.	"Rahmanur-Rahim"	English, Arabic	3:50
3.	"Realisation"	English, Arabic	3:34
4.	"Ishara"	Bengali, English	4:28
5.	"Knowledge"	English,Arabic	3:11
6.	"Salam"	English, Arabic	2:37
7.	"Traveller"	English	4:30
8.	"Heart to Heart"	English, Arabic	3:39
9.	"Confession"	Arabic, English	3:29
10.	"Light"	Arabic, Urdu, English	4:01
Total length:			36:44
