= Habib Belk =

Musical artist

Habib Belkziz
- Born: حبيب بلقزيز; 9 November 1989 (age 36); Marrakesh, Morocco
- Genre: Gnawa
- Occupations: Singer, songwriter
- Years active: 2006 –
- Label: HaBiBelk Productions Records

Habib Belkziz (Arabic: حبيب بلقزيز; born 9 November 1989) is a Moroccan gnawa singer, audio engineer, music producer, songwriter and multi-instrumentalist. He released the Album Sidi Kmmy produced by HaBiBelk Productions Records.

== Career ==
=== Beginnings ===
Habib Belkziz was born on born 9 November 1989 in Marrakesh. He started singing at eight years old and made his first appearances since the age of nine in family weddings. In his childhood he was often invited to the Gnawa evening gatherings "LILA" with his uncle "Maàllam Abdelkbir Merchan" in Marrakech. His interest was quickly aroused in the Gnawa Spiritual Music. His uncle recognized his passion for music and gave him his first little Guimbri that he called "Awicha". Over the years, Habib gained more experience through many appearances at festivals, weddings, hotels, riads, traditional restaurants as a solo entertainer but also as a member of multiple groups in Morocco and Europe. He became active in 2005 under the name Habibelk.

Later on, Habib moved from Morocco to Germany and released his first video in his YouTube channel that was established back in 2006.

On 15 March 2017, Habib released his first videos Hammadi then Mberika and Baba Mimoun that are all part of the album Sidi kmmy. In 2018, he co-produced the song "Al Ayta" with the Egyptian artist Hamza Namira. The song was on the top 10 ranking of the Moroccan Radio channel Hit Radio.

In 2019, Habib Belk produced the song Sandiya with new melodies and a different way of singing, arranging and mixing. Habibelk is known by innovating and mixing the Moroccan traditional Gnawa music with other genres including Trap, Bass, Reggaeton, Electro as well as R&B in an attempt to open up this music from a local perspective to a more global one.

=== Gnawa Deutschland ===
In 2017, Habibelk founded the group Gnawa Deutschland together with three other artists: Rachid Lamouri from Berlin, Zakaria Izoubaz from Weinheim and Rabiie Rezgaoui from Bad Salzuflen (all Karkabou, dance and singing). The group tours and participates in various festivals and concerts in Europe and offers special Workshops in universities and schools in Germany.

== Discography ==
=== Sidi Kmmy album ===
- Fulani Hiriza "SOLO" – 2016
- Hammadi – 2017
- Mberika – 2017
- Baba Mimoun – 2017
- El Hadia – 2017
- La ilaha ila llah – 2018
- Goumari – 2018
- Youbati – 2018
- Sidi Kmmy – 2018

=== Music videos ===
- Baba Mimoun – 2017
- Sidi Kmmy – 2018
- Sandiya – 2019
- Homiya - 2019
- Aicha - 2020
- Bouhali - 2020
- Sinama - 2021
- Amina - 2021
- Lala Mira - 2022
- My Mona - 2023
- Mogador - 2023
- Polo Labani - 2023
- Homiya "Acoustic" - 2024
- Baniya - 2024

=== Collaborations ===
- Remix with Hamza Namira – Al Ayta – 2018
- Goumari - 2019: D33pSoul & Habib Belk
- Mimouna - 2020: D33pSoul & Habib Belk
- Sandiya - 2021: Dj Van & Habib Belk
