= Mohamed Tahar Fergani =

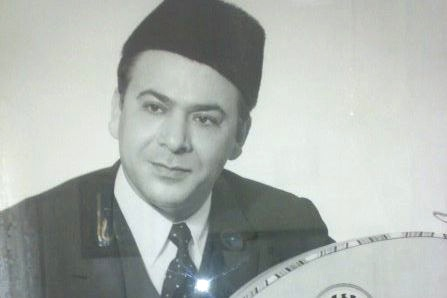

Mohamed Tahar Fergani (9 May 1928 – 7 December 2016) was an Algerian singer, violinist and composer, nicknamed the Nightingale of Constantine.

== Early life ==
He was born in Constantine. Master of the Malouf music of Constantine. Mohamed Tahar Fergani is one of the few singers to interpret compositions on four octaves. In addition to the Malouf, he interprets the Mahjouz (popular Constantinois type that derives from the Malouf), Zjoul (musical genre as old as the Malouf, constantinois) and Hawzi (popular type that derives from the Tlemcen Gharnati).

== Career ==
His father Hamou Fergani was a singer of Hawzi. Mohamed Tahar begins in the oriental music, he later changed of style approaching the Malouf. Its main two masters were Cheîkh Hassouna and Cheîkh Baba Abid. The Ferganies are very taken by the Malouf. His sister Z'hor was also a singer and his son Salim is a recognized cheîkh of Malouf. Mohamed Tahar has hundreds of records to his credit and has received several international awards. He created his Orchestra and his school of Constantine. One of his songs known in Algeria "Ed Dhalma" (the unjust) of the poet, Henni Bengenoune. He died in Paris at the age of 88 on 7 December 2016.

== Notes and references ==
- Bouziane Ben Achour, local Figures, page 32, 2003
