= Eftekasat =

Egyptian jazz band

- Origin: Cairo, Egypt
- Genres: Jazz, world fusion
- Years active: 2001–present
- Labels: Incognito
- Members: Amro Salah; Samer George; Ahmad Hesham; Laith Soliman; Sherif Alaa; Hany Bedair; Mohamad Medhat
- Website: eftekasat.com

Eftekasat (Egyptian Arabic: افتكاسات [eftekæˈsæːt], "innovations") is an Egyptian jazz band that was established in late 2001 and gave its debut performance in February 2002 at the Cairo Jazz Club. The band has been praised by critics for the melding of different music styles. In 2015 Eftekasat became the resident performing band for Saturday Night Live Arabia.

Eftekasat is one of the few Egyptian independent music groups to establish its reputation in a short time.

== Origin and history ==
Growing up in a musical family and influenced by classic music, Amr Salah started composing music during his youth. He kept experimenting and writing music until he was introduced to the jazz scene. Although exposing his music wasn't an easy process, he kept documenting the music by notation, sequencer, or recording. One of his first tunes, written around 1992, is "Anxiety", which turned out to be "Anxious Dance", the first track on the album Mouled Sidi El-Latini. Salah met Samer George at the French Cultural Centre where Samer was performing Beatles songs. Salah was so fascinated that after the show he hugged Samer, and they started their musical journey.

In 1995 they traveled to Bahrain and with drummer Amr Khairy formed a trio that played cover songs. When they returned to Cairo seven years later, they played original compositions at a jazz festival hosted by the Cairo Jazz Club. By this time, ney player Hany El Badry had become a member of the band. In February 2002, Eftekasat was introduced at the Jazz Festival at the Cairo Jazz Club, joined by a vocalist, Hany Adel.

After Cairo Jazz Club, recording of the demo started with the addition of percussionist Hany Bedair. The demo was sent to Bansko International Jazz Festival in Bulgaria and they were invited to perform there. Later, the band started putting music together for Mo'taz El Demerdash's talk show with vocalist Amr Yehia and performed in several international festivals in Arab countries. The band noticed the way audiences interacted with them and decided to become an instrumental group. The six members became Eftekasat. The name comes from a slang term for spontaneity that was popular with young people in Cairo.

In January 2006, Eftekasat was awarded a production grant of $3500 from the Culture Resource "Al-Mawred Al Thaqafy" and recorded their first album, Mouled Sidi El-Latini, which required a fund of $11000. Set in Media Production City Studios, the recording started in April 2006 and ended in July of the same year. Mixing was made at Sound Design, Amr Yehia's studio, while the sound engineers were Amr Yehia and Alaa El Kashef. American composer Daryl Kennedy, who sometimes shared a stage with the band, produced the album.

Besides the fact that Mouled Sidi El-Latini was released internationally, Eftekasat became international when they were invited to perform at the 2008 Carthage Jazz Festival in Tunis, performing with Gilberto Gil from Brazil, the Portuguese Maria João & Mário Laginha, William Parker from the U.S., Dhafer Youssef from Tunis, the Italian Gino Paoli, the Frenchman Jacques Schwarz-Bart, and the Englishman Murray Head.

== Influences ==
Although Amro Salah is the composer of the group, Ousso the guitarist has also contributed in writing some of the songs. Their influences had a great impact on Eftekasat, especially Amro's, which included classical, jazz, pop and rock. His mother had a great impact, as she worked as a classical piano teacher and he began playing classical music.

Other influences include Omar Khairat, Algerian Mohamed El Anka, Chick Corea, Herbie Hancock, McCoy Tyner, Lyle Mays, Spyro Gyra, Yellowjackets, Ziad Rahbani, Frank Zappa, and The Beatles, who had a great impact on him. Before he played jazz, he memorized, played, and sang Beatles songs. Salah's ambition is to become internationally recognized like Chick Corea's Electric Group or Spyro Gyra.

The group regularly performs at Cairo Opera House, Bibliotheca Alexandrina, Cairo Jazz Club, and "Sakia" (El Sawy Culturewheel) "ساقية الصاوى".

== Band members ==
- Amro Salah – piano, keyboard
- Samer George – bass
- Ahmad Hesham – drums
- Laith Soliman – nay
- Sherif Alaa – guitar
- Hany Bedair – percussion
- Mohamad Medhat - violin

=== Former members ===
- Amro Khairy – drums
- Hany Badry – nay
- Ouso – guitar

== Discography ==
- 2006 Mouled Sidi El-Latini (The Latin Dervish) "مولد سيدى اللاتينى"
- 2010 Dandasha دندشه
- 2015 Gar Shakal جر شكل
