= One (Maher Zain album) =

Studio album by Maher Zain
- Released: June 6, 2016
- Recorded: 2013–2016
- Genre: RnB, Islamic, soul
- Length: 58 minutes (standard edition); 1 hour 42 minutes (standard edition, with bonus tracks)
- Label: Awakening
- Producer: Maher Zain, Bara Kherigi

Maher Zain chronology
Forgive Me (2012)	One (2016)

Singles from One
- 1. "The Power" Released: May 06, 2016; 2. "Peace Be Upon You" Released: May 27, 2016; 3. "The Way of Love" Released: June 23, 2016; 4. "I'm Alive" Released: September 09, 2016

One is the third studio album by Swedish singer Maher Zain and was released on June 6, 2016 by Awakening Records.

== Music videos ==
- The first music video from the album was titled "The Power"(on Arabic "Bil'thikr"). It was released on May 6, 2016. The video was translated into two languages, English and Arabic
- The second music video from the album was "Peace Be Upon You". It was released on May 27, 2016. Zain re-recorded this music in Bahasa Indonesia for Indonesian audiences.
- The third music video entitled "The Way of Love", was released on June 23, 2016. This video was translated into three languages, English, Arabic and Turkish.
- The fourth music video entitled "I'm Alive", was released on 9 September 2016 featuring Atif Aslam.
- The fifth music video entitled "Close to You", was released on 11 December 2016.

== Track listing ==
The full track list was announced at iTunes on June 6, 2016

No.	Title	Writer(s)	Length
1.	"The Power" (with Amakhono We Sintu)	Maher Zain, Bara Kherigi & Paddy Dalton.	4:03
2.	"Medina"	Maher Zain, Bilal Hajji & Paddy Dalton.	3:58
3.	"Peace Be Upon You"	Bara Kherigi, Maher Zain, & Paddy Dalton.	4:31
4.	"Good Day" (with Issam Kamal)	Maher Zain, Bara Kherigi, Paddy Dalton.	3:23
5.	"By My Side"	Maher Zain, Bara Kherigi & Paddy Dalton.	3:02
6.	"Jannah"	Maher Zain, Bara Kherigi, & Paddy Dalton.	4:23
7.	"I'm Alive" (with Atif Aslam)	Maher Zain & Druv Ghanekar	4:18
8.	"Allah Ya Moulana"	Maher Zain & Ahmed Al-Yafie	4:17
9.	"Rabbee Yebarik"	Paddy Dalton, Maher Zain, & Bara Kherigi	3:41
10.	"True Love"	Bara Kherigi, Maher Zain, & Paddy Dalton	3:20
11.	"Let It Go"	Maher Zain, Bara Kherigi, & Paddy Dalton	3:39
12.	"The Way of Love" (with Mustafa Ceceli)	Bara Kherigi, Maher Zain & Paddy Dalton, Alper Altuntoprak	4:01
13.	"Close to You"	Maher Zain, Bara Kherigi, & Paddy Dalton, Moh Denebi	3:42
14.	"One Day"	Maher Zain, Bara Kherigi, & Paddy Dalton, Ahmed Al-Yafie	4:10
15.	"Ummati"	Maher Zain, Bara Kherigi, & Paddy Dalton, Ahmed Al-Yafie	3:49

Arabic bonus track
No.	Title	Writer(s)	Length
1.	"Bil'thikr" (with Amakhono We Sintu)	Ahmed Al-Yafie.	4:03
2.	"Jannah" (Arabic version)	Saif Fadhel.	3:58
3.	"Rabbee Yebarik" (Arabic version)	Ahmed Al-Yafie.	3:39
4.	"Tadroon"	Saif Fadhel.	3:58
5.	"Bika Mulhimi" (with Mustafa Ceceli)	Alper Altuntoprak.	3:59
6.	"Ummati" (Arabic version)	Ahmed Al-Yafie	3:47
