= Humood AlKhudher =

Kuwaiti singer-songwriter (born 1989)

Humood AlKhudher حمود عثمان الخضر
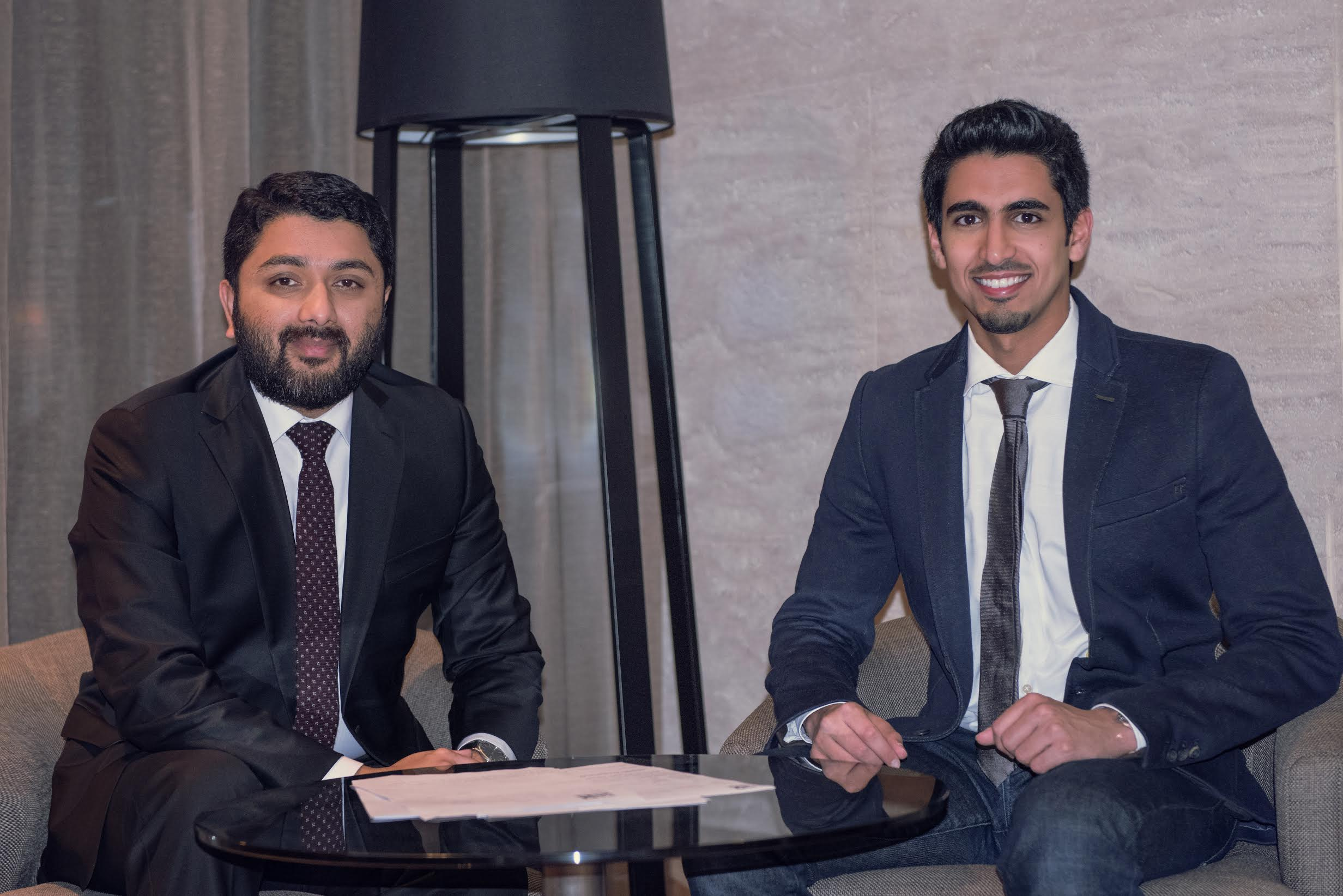
- Humood AlKhuder (right) with Sharif H. Banna (left), founder of Awakening Records.

Background information
- Born: Humood Othman Alkhudher; 24 January 1989 (age 37); Kuwait City, Kuwait
- Origin: Kuwait
- Genres: Contemporary; soul; Islamic
- Occupations: Singer; songwriter; musician
- Instruments: Vocals; piano
- Years active: 1999–present
- Labels: Awakening; Rotana
- Website: awakening.org/humood-alkhudher/

Humood Othman AlKhudher (Arabic: حمود عثمان الخضر; born 24 January 1989), also known mononymously as Humood, is a Kuwaiti singer and songwriter.

Humood released his compilation album Fekra in 2013. In 2014, he was signed to Awakening Records, and in 2015 he launched his album Aseer Ahsan. In February 2020, he announced his new album Matha Ba’d?.

== Early life and education ==
Humood was born in Kuwait on 24 January 1989. He spent some of his childhood years in England before returning to Kuwait.

He obtained his bachelor's degree in Mass Communication from Kuwait University. After that, he took piano and vocal lessons in Toronto, Canada. He also studied a music business course at Berklee College of Music.

== Career ==
Humood began his musical career in 1999 as a backing vocalist for his uncle who would regularly perform at local events. At age 13, he sang Ummi Filisteen, a duet with Mishari Al-Aradah on the suffering of Palestinians.

In January 2015, Humood was signed to Awakening Records and launched his debut album Aseer Ahsan, which had the themes of determination and self-empowerment. The album included 10 songs, one of which was Kun Anta, that was accompanied by a music video which went viral. Aseer Ahsan reached number 10 on the Billboard World Albums Chart.

== Discography ==
=== Albums ===
- 2013: Fekra (Arabic: فكرة)
- 2015: Aseer Ahsan (أصير أحسن)
- 2020: Matha Ba’d? (ماذا بعد)

=== Music videos ===
- 2016: Kun Anta (in Arabic كن أنت)
- 2016: Ha Anatha (in Arabic هأنذا)
- 2017: Lughat Al'Aalam (in Arabic لغات العالم)
- 2017: Be Curious (in Arabic (كن فضولين)
- 2020: Dandin Ma’i (in Arabic دندن معي)
- 2021: Hawil Marra Okhra (in Arabic حاول مرة أخرى)

=== Single ===
- Sharab Al-hubb (in Arabic شراب الحب)
- Tari Elfarah (in Arabic طاري الفرح)
- Heya Al jannah (in Arabic هي الجنة)
- Ahaseb nefsi (in Arabic احسب نفسي )
- Marhab ya Hilal (in Arabic مرحب يا هلال )
- Qiyam ( in Arabic قيم)
- Ya Lail ( in Arabic يا ليل)
- Ashko Ela Allah
- Hadaf
- Halaat Al Bent
- Zammiluni (in Arabic زملوني)
- Belquran Ehtadayt (in Arabic با القرآن اهتديت 3588)
- Belmaggani (in Arabic بالمجاني)

== Personal life ==
Humood married Mafaz Al-Suwaidan in 2010. She is the daughter of Islamic author and speaker, Tareq Al-Suwaidan, who is also a leader of Kuwait's Muslim Brotherhood.
