= Irfan Makki =

Irfan Makki عرفان مکی
- Born: 30 October 1975 (age 50); Pakistan
- Origin: Canada
- Genres: World music; Nasheed
- Occupations: Singer; songwriter; musician; composer
- Instruments: Vocals; guitar; piano; keyboard
- Years active: 1997 –
- Labels: Awakening; Sony Music; Rotana Records

Irfan Makki (Urdu: عرفان مکی; born 30 October 1975) is a Pakistani-born Canadian singer-songwriter. He is known for his album, “I Believe”, and his collaborations with Maher Zain and Mesut Kurtis.

== Career ==
After signing with Awakening Records, he released the album I Believe, with 13 tracks. The title track "I Believe", featuring the Swedish-Lebanese musician Maher Zain, was released as a single accompanied by an official music video.

The following year, he and Zain launched an Urdu song, Allah Hi Allah Kiya Karo, under the label Awakening Records.

== Discography ==
Albums

Year	Album	Record label
1997	Reminisce	Independent release
2006	Salam	Sound Vision
2011	I Believe	Awakening Records

== Videography ==
- 2011: "I Believe" (feat. Maher Zain)
