= Maher Zain =

Lebanese-Swedish R&B singer (born 1981)

Maher Zain ماهر زين
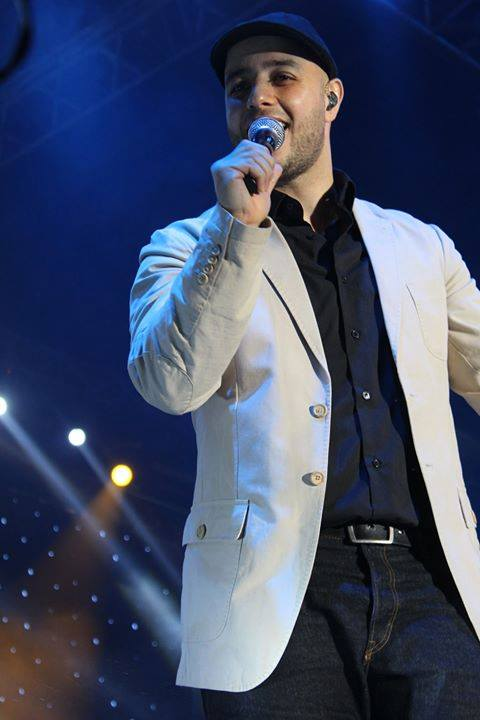
- Zain performing in Konya, Turkey, in March 2014

Background information
- Born: Maher Mustafa Zain ماهر مصطفى ماهر زين; 16 July 1981 (age 45); Tripoli, Lebanon
- Genres: R&B; soul; Islamic; nasheed
- Occupations: Singer; songwriter; musician; composer; music producer
- Instruments: Vocals; guitar; piano; keyboard; percussion; synthesizers
- Years active: 2009–present
- Labels: Awakening; Rotana

Maher Mustafa Zain (Arabic: ماهر مصطفى ماهر زين; born 16 July 1981) is a Lebanese-Swedish Islamic Nasheeds and R&B singer, songwriter and music producer. He released his debut album Thank You Allah, an internationally successful album produced by Awakening Records, in 2009. He released his follow-up album Forgive Me in April 2012 under the same production company, a third album One in 2016, and one mini album Nour Ala Nour in 2021. Ten years after his third album, he released his fourth album, Back To You in 2026.

== Career ==
=== Early life ===
Born in Tripoli in 1981, Maher Zain emigrated with his Lebanese family to Sweden in 1989. He completed his schooling there, gaining a bachelor's degree in aeronautical engineering. After university, he entered the music industry in Sweden, and in 2005 linked up with the Moroccan-born Swedish producer RedOne. When RedOne moved to New York in 2006, Zain soon followed to continue his music industry career in the United States, producing for artists such as Kat DeLuna.

On returning home to Sweden, Zain became engaged once more with his Islamic faith and decided to move away from a career as a music producer to become a singer/songwriter of contemporary R&B music with a strong Islamic influence.

=== Breakthrough and success ===
In January 2009, Zain began working on an album with Awakening Records. His debut album, Thank You Allah, with 13 songs and two bonus tracks, was released on 1 November 2009 with percussion versions and French versions of some tracks released shortly afterwards. Earlier, he had published some of his tracks on Sony Music Group and Rotana Music Group, though his tracks became popular at Awakening Music.

Zain and Awakening Records successfully used Facebook, YouTube and iTunes to promote tracks from the album. In early 2010 his music very quickly gathered a huge online following in Arabic-speaking and Islamic countries as well as among young Muslims in western countries. By the end of 2010, he was the most Googled celebrity in Malaysia for that year. Malaysia and Indonesia have been the countries where he has had the most commercial success. The album Thank You Allah has been certified multiple platinum by Warner Music Malaysia and Sony Music Indonesia. It became the highest selling album of 2010 in Malaysia.

Zain sings mainly in English but has released some of his most popular songs in other languages. The song "Insha Allah", for example, is now available in English, French, Arabic, Turkish, Malay and Indonesian versions. Another song, "Allahi Allah Kiya Karo" ("Continuously Saying Allah"), is sung in Urdu and features the Pakistan-born Canadian singer Irfan Makki, while his 2012 song Asalamu Alayka was sung in about six different languages, including Arabic, English, Turkish, beyond others.

Zain has performed concerts around the world, including in the UK, the United States, Malaysia, Indonesia, Saudi Arabia and Egypt. He has fan clubs in several countries including Malaysia, Egypt, and Morocco. He took part in the judging committee of the Awakening Talent Contest to choose Awakening Records' new star in 2013.

== Collaborations, appearances and awards ==
In January 2010, Zain won Best Religious Song for 'Ya Nabi Salam Alayka', on Nogoum FM, a major Middle East mainstream music station, beating other prominent singers including Hussein Al-Jismi, Mohammed Mounir and Sami Yusuf.

In March 2011, Zain released "Freedom", a song inspired by the events and the actions of the people taking part in the Arab Spring.

Zain was chosen as a Muslim Star of 2011 in a competition organized by Onislam.net. In July 2011 he featured on the cover of the UK Muslim lifestyle magazine Emel.

Zain was featured on Irfan Makki's track "I Believe" from his debut studio album of the same name.

Zain has appeared in the 40-episode Indonesian TV drama Insya-Allah. The show was aired on Malaysian satellite TV channel, Astro Oasis and Mustika HD, starting 17 July 2012, concurrent with the broadcasting of the show on Indonesia's SCTV.

In 2013, he took part in the Colors of Peace project constituting songs based on works by Fethullah Gülen on the album Rise Up where Maher Zain performs the track "This Worldly Life".

In 2025, Maher Zain collaborated with Harris J to perform the song Qalbi Fi Madinah, which is a song expressing their love of the Prophet Muhammad.

== Discography ==
=== Albums ===
Year	Album details	Certifications (sales thresholds)
2009	Thank You Allah: Released: 1 November 2009; Label: Awakening Records; Formats: CD, Digital Download	8× Platinum, Warner Music Malaysia; 2× Platinum, Sony Music Indonesia
2012	Forgive Me: Released: 2 April 2012; Label: Awakening Records; Formats: CD, Digital Download	4× Platinum, Warner Music Malaysia
2016	One: Released: 6 June 2016; Label: Awakening Records; Formats: CD, Digital Download	–
2026	Back To You: Released: 1 May 2026; Label: Awakening Records; Formats: Digital Download	–

=== Compilations ===
Year	Album details
2014	Singles & Duets: Released: December 2014; Label: Awakening Records; Formats: Digital Download, CD; Total tracks: 15 tracks
2018	The Best of Maher Zain Live & Acoustic: Released: April 2018; Label: Awakening Records; Formats: Digital Download, CD; Total tracks: 14 tracks

=== Mini albums ===
Year	Album details
2013	Love Will Prevail: Released: April 2013; Label: Awakening Records; Formats: Digital download; Total tracks: 2 tracks
2013	Ramadan: Released: June 2013; Label: Awakening Records; Formats: Digital download; Total tracks: 4 tracks
2014	Ramadan – Vocals Only Version: Released: July 2014; Label: Awakening Records; Formats: Digital download; Total tracks: 2 tracks
2021	Nour Ala Nour: Released: April 2021; Label: Awakening Music; Formats: Digital download; Total tracks: 6 tracks

=== Singles ===
- 2009: Palestine Will Be Free
- 2010: Insha Allah
- 2010: The Chosen One
- 2011: Freedom
- 2011: Ya Nabi Salam Alayka
- 2011: For The Rest Of My Life
- 2014: Samih
- 2014: Nas Teshbehlena
- 2015: A'amarona A'amalona
- 2022: Rahmatun lil'Alameen
- 2022: Eidun Mubarak

== Videography ==
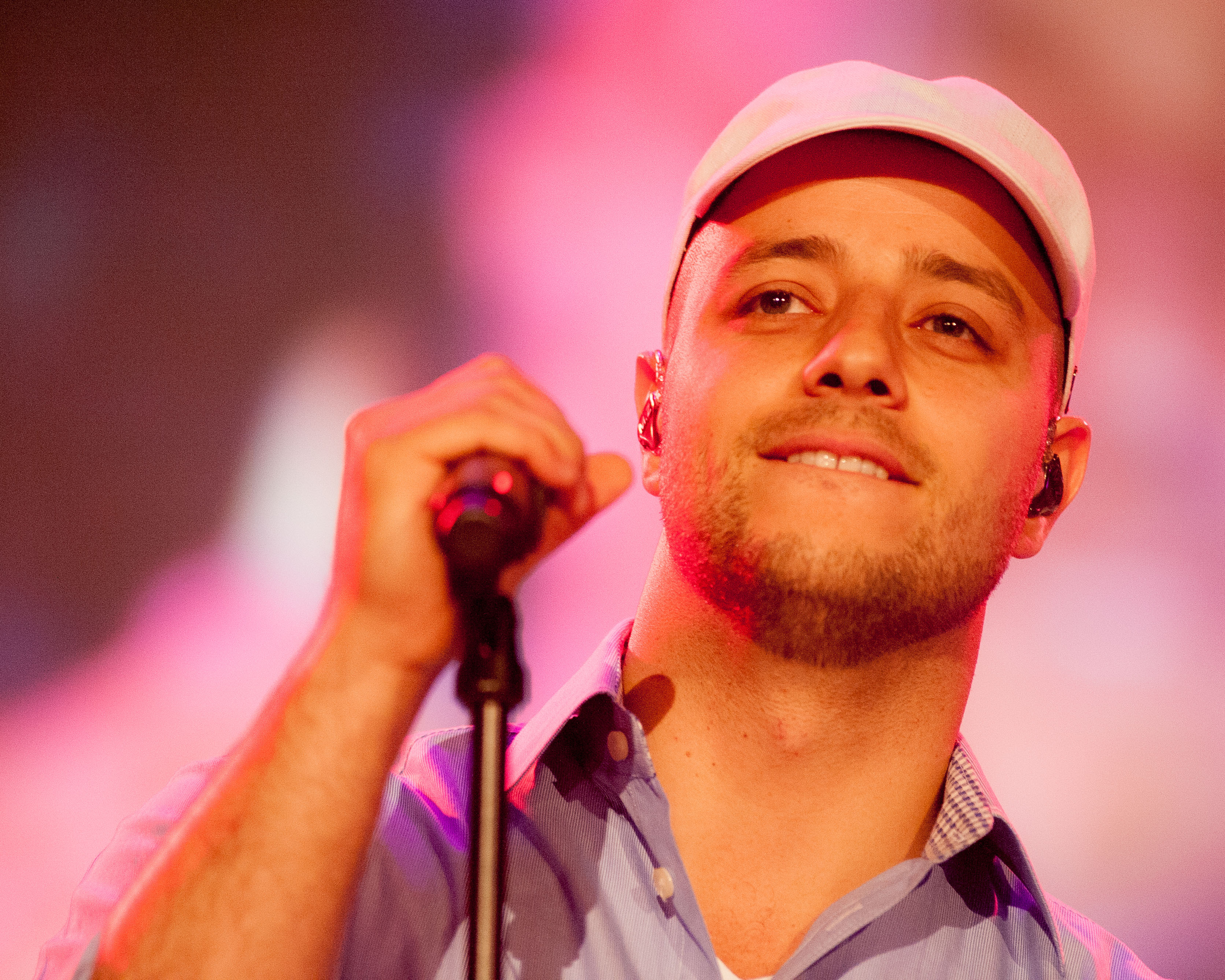
Maher Zain at Tuisa charity concert in Essen, Germany (2012)

- 2009: Palestine Will Be Free
- 2009: Subhan Allah
- 2010: Insha Allah
- 2010: The Chosen One
- 2011: Freedom
- 2011: Ya Nabi Salam Alayka
- 2011: For the Rest of My Life
- 2012: Number One For Me
- 2012: So Soon
- 2012: Guide Me All the Way
- 2013: Love Will Prevail
- 2013: Ramadan
- 2014: Muhammad (P.B.U.H)
- 2014: Nas Teshbehlana (in Arabic ناس تشبهلنا)
- 2014: One Day
- 2015: A'maroona A'maloona (in Arabic أعمارنا أعمالنا)
- 2016: I am Alive (with Atif Aslam)
- 2016: By my Side
- 2016: Good Day
- 2016: True Love
- 2016: Paradise
- 2016: Peace Be Upon You
- 2016: The Way of Love (with Mustafa Ceceli)
- 2017: Close to You
- 2017: As-subhu Bada (in Arabic الصبح بدا)
- 2017: Kun Rahma (in Arabic كن رحمة)
- 2017: Medina
- 2018: Huwa AlQuran
- 2019: Ala Nahjik Mashayt
- 2019: Live It Up (feat. Lenny Martinez)
- 2019: Ummi
- 2020: Antassalam
- 2020: Asma Allah Alhusna (The 99 Names of Allah)
- 2020: Break The Chains
- 2020: Srebrenica
- 2021: Nour Ala Nour
- 2021: Huwa Ahmadun
- 2021: Laytaka Ma'ana
- 2021: Qalbi Sajad
- 2021: Hubb Ennabi
- 2021: Nuru Nebi (in Turkish Nûru Nebi)
- 2022: No One But You
- 2022: Rahmatun Lil Alameen
- 2022: Eidun Mubarak
- 2022: Tahayya (with Humood AlKhuder)
- 2022: Dima Maghreb (with Humood AlKhuder)
- 2024: Ya Habiba Ya Falastin
- 2024: Salla Alaika Rehman
- 2024: Ey Ghafuru Rahim
- 2024: Free Palestine
- 2024: Lebanon
- 2025: Qalbi Fil Madinah
- 2025: La Tahzan

Featured in

- 2011: I Believe (Irfan Makki feat. Maher Zain) (in Irfan Makki's album I Believe)
- 2009 : Never Forget (Mesut Kurtis feat. Maher Zain) (in Mesut Kurtis' album Beloved)
- 2014: So Real (Raef feat. Maher Zain) (in Raef's album The Path)
- 2014: Eidun Saeed (Mesut Kurtis feat. Maher Zain) (in Mesut Kurtis' album Tabassam)

== Philanthropic activities ==
- In 2013, Zain performed in Canada on a tour organised by Islamic Relief to raise donations for typhoon victims in the Philippines. Zain took part in the UK "Sound of Light" event organized by Human Appeal International in support of the Syrian people. Zain also dedicated his song "Love will prevail" (sung in Arabic and English) to the Syrians.
- Zain celebrated his birthday with his 3.9 million Facebook fans by asking them to donate money to a United States–based charity organization that builds water wells in Africa. His fans paid more than $15,000 within a few weeks.
- Zain took part in a London pro-Palestinian rally, joined by thousands of people, to call for the end to Israeli military action in Gaza. In August 2014, Zain took part in "The Great Wall of China Trek 2014" a 10-day humanitarian mission in association with Human Appeal to raise donations for clean water to children in Gaza.
- Ahead of performing at the 2014 Nansen Refugee Award Ceremony, Zain travelled to Lebanon with UNHCR to spend time with Syrian refugees and see UNHCR's frontline work. Zain sang "One Day" about refugees in Geneva's Bâtiment des Forces Motrices for the award ceremony.
