= List of Muslim comedians =

This is a list of Muslim comedians based in Muslim-minority countries:

- Prince Abdi (born 1982) – United Kingdom
- Nabil Abdul Rashid (born 1987) – United Kingdom
- Abdullah Afzal – United Kingdom
- Ahmed Ahmed (born 1970) – United States
- Aman Ali (born 1985) – United States
- Mohammed Amer (born 1981) – United States
- Ali "Baba Ali" Ardekani (born 1975) – United States
- Humza Arshad (born 1985) – United Kingdom
- Aristotle Athari (born 1991) — ְUnited States
- Sadia Azmat (born 1987) – United Kingdom
- Tahir Bilgiç (born 1970) – Australia
- Dave Chappelle (born 1973) – United States
- Jamel Debbouze (born 1975) – France
- Said Durrah (born 1982) – United States
- Mohammed El-Leissy (born 1985) – Australia
- Mona Hala (born 1985) – Austria
- Ali Hassan – Canada
- Nazeem Hussain (born 1986) – Australia
- Tez Ilyas (born 1983) – United Kingdom
- Maz Jobrani (born 1972) – United States
- Hisham Kelati – Canada
- Guz Khan (Guzzy Bear) (born 1986) – United Kingdom
- Kae Kurd (born 1990) – United Kingdom
- Ola Labib (born 1988 or 1989) – United Kingdom
- Nawell Madani (born 1979) – Belgium
- Aasif Mandvi (born 1966) – United Kingdom, United States
- Hasan Minhaj (born 1985) – United States
- Jeff Mirza (born 1964) – United Kingdom
- Shazia Mirza (born 1977) – United Kingdom
- Riaad Moosa (born 1977) – South Africa
- Bryant Reginald "Preacher" Moss (born 1967) – United States
- Sammy Obeid (born 1984) - United States
- Dean Obeidallah (born 1969) – United States
- Aamer Rahman (born 1982) – Australia
- Sibtain Raza (born 1987) – LegendofSib.com – United States, Pakistan
- Omar Regan (born 1975) – United States
- Jay Shareef (born 1982) – United Kingdom
- Ali "Ali Official" Shahalom (born 1993) – United Kingdom
- Azhar Usman (born 1975) – United States
- Ramy Youssef (born 1991) - United States
- Bilal Zafar (born 1991) – United Kingdom
- Maysoon Zayid (born 1974) – United States

== See also ==
- Humour in Islam
