= World's Funniest Island =

Australian comedy event

The World's Funniest Island 2010 logo.

World's Funniest Island was an Australian comedy event held on the third weekend in October on Cockatoo Island, in Sydney Harbour. The first World's Funniest Island event took place 17–18 October 2009. It consisted of approximately 200 shows and involving over 250 performers in 12 indoor venues, and three outdoor stages, playing to 12,000 punters.

The team behind World's Funniest Island is John Pinder, Director; Nick Murray, CEO Jigsaw Entertainment; Michael Chugg and Matthew Lazarus Hall, Chugg Entertainment; and Greg James, investor and chairman of the board. The executive producer of World's Funniest Island is Gina Hall. Mark Ford was executive producer of the 2009 event.

John Pinder has worked extensively in the comedy industry, having begun as a venue owner and producer of both music and comedy events. He was the founding director of both the Melbourne International Comedy Festival and the Big Laugh Comedy Festival in Western Sydney, and had a hand in founding the Comedy Channel. Pinder worked Nick Murray, both during Murray's time as founding CEO of the Comedy Channel, and in the production of a number of comedy shows for stage and television. Michael Chugg is an agent, manager and concert promoter.

The Goodies' Tim Brooke-Taylor at World's Funniest Island, 2009.

== History ==
Cockatoo Island, situated at the mouth of the Parramatta and the Lane Cove Rivers, is the largest island in Sydney Harbour. Having served as a colonial prison from 1839 and then as the Commonwealth Naval Dockyard from 1913, it was opened to the public in 2008. Shortly before being declared public parkland, a handful of people involved with the Australian comedy industry undertook a private tour of the island and recognised its potential as the ideal space for a comedy event. It offered unique indoor and outdoor spaces – including dozens of heritage-listed buildings that once served the island's specific needs as a prison and then a dockyard – as well as views of the Sydney skyline and Sydney Harbour. Its location, a short ferry ride from central Sydney made Cockatoo Island a perfect events location. The Island has also hosted two music festivals, most recently one curated by Nick Cave - All Tomorrow's Parties. The island is an important location for The Biennale of Sydney, the city's major contemporary art event.

The second World's Funniest Island event, slated for 16–17 October 2010, was cancelled due to a sponsorship shortfall. News of the event's cancellation appeared on 6 October.

== Format ==
Unlike traditional comedy festivals, World's Funniest Island is an event loosely built on the weekend music festival template, with several stages and indoor venues operating concurrently. A single ticket offers unlimited access to the various shows and include transport to and from the island – via a ferry service operating all day from Darling Harbour, in Sydney’s CBD. There are also a number of bars, food and market stalls operating during the festival. In 2010 a camping package will be available for Friday, Saturday and Sunday night.

== Venues ==
The venues on the island vary in size and shape, catering to a wide variety of comedy shows and audiences. The Turbine Hall, for example, is a large capacity venue presenting acts that require space for audiences of 2000 plus. In 2009 acts in The Turbine Hall included The Goodies (UK), Alexei Sayle (UK) and Allah Made Me Funny (USA). Some venues are programmed around a theme. For example, in 2009 the Naval Store offered a selection of Australian acts that had begun life as university revues. That same year, other venues were run as extensions of independent Sydney comedy rooms, with the General Store operating as Comedy On The Edge and the Bomb Shelter, as the Laugh Garage Comedy Club. The complete list of venues and the acts that performed in them in 2009 are listed below.

== Programming ==
The World’s Funniest Island presents a wide range of comedy genres, including stand-up, sketch shows, circus, musical comedy, comic burlesque, movie parodies, comic literary readings, plays, and roving entertainment. There are also exhibitions, workshops and some participation activities designed for adults and children.

Artists are selected by the producers. The event is not an open ‘fringe style’ festival.

== 2009 Program ==
Venue	Saturday 17 October	Sunday 18 October
Harbour Stage	The Spooky Men's Chorale (Aust); Scared Weird Little Guys (Aust); Merrick and Rosso (Aust) & Chris Franklin (Aust); Felicity Ward (Aust), Jacques Barrett (Aust), Daniel Townes (Aust) & Claire Hooper (Aust); Thank God It's Friday on Saturday Live (Aust) & Jean Kittson (Aust); The Axis of Awesome (Aust); Black Rose (Aust); Die Roten Punkte (Germany/Aust)	The Bakery (Aust); Triple Bill: Jimeoin (Nth Ire/Aust) Arj Barker (US) Akmal (Aust); Tripod (Aust); The Axis of Awesome (Aust); Die Roten Punkte (Germany/Aust)
Turbine Hall	Andrew Hansen (Aust) with The Goodies (UK); Austen Tayshus (Aust); Julian Morrow (Aust) with Alexei Sayle (UK); Andrew Hansen (Aust) with The Goodies (UK); Merrick and Rosso (Aust); Chris Franklin (Aust) Alexei Sayle (UK); Allah Made Me Funny (USA); The Mad Max Remix (Aust)	Andrew Hansen (Aust) with The Goodies (UK); Laughapoolooza Music Comedy Gala (Aust) - James Valentine, The Axis of Awesome, Sammy J, Jackie Loeb, Geraldine Quinn, Luke & Wyatt; Austen Tayshus (Aust); Heath Franklin’s Chopper (Aust); Allah Made Me Funny (USA); Andrew Hansen (Aust) with The Goodies (UK); Heath Franklin’s Chopper (Aust); The Mad Max Remix (Aust)
Naval Store (Campus Comedy)	Princess Cabaret (Aust); Make Way for the Ducklings (Aust); The Anarchist Guild Social Committee (Aust); Insert Comedy (Aust); The Delusionists (Aust); Celia Pacquola, Dave Bushell, Richard McKenzie & Nick Caddaye (Aust); Vigilantelope Tale of the Golden Lease (Aust); Showcase Show (Aust)	Princess Cabaret (Aust); The Anarchist Guild Social Committee (Aust); Make Way for the Ducklings (Aust); Insert Comedy (Aust); The Delusionists (Aust); Celia Pacquola, Dave Bushell, Richard McKenzie & Nick Caddaye (Aust); Vigilantelope Tale of the Golden Lease (Aust); Showcase Show (Aust)
General Store (Comedy On The Edge)	The Showcase (Aust); Dolores Mixed Bag (Aust); The MW Oh Show, John Robertson & Peter Green (Aust); The Bad Boys of Comedy (Aust); Jason Chatfield and Ben Russell are Manface (Aust); Comics On The Run (Aust/Scot);	Dolores Mixed Bag (Aust); The MW Oh Show, John Robertson & Peter Green (Aust); The Bad Boys of Comedy (Aust); Dolores Mixed Bag (Aust); Jason Chatfield and Ben Russell are Manface (Aust); Comics On The Run (Aust/Scot);
Blacksmiths Bar	Keeth Diamond (Aust); The Dirty Brothers (Aust); The Nelson Twins (Aust); The Birdmann (Aust); James Valentine Quartet (Aust); Empress Stah (Aust); Luke & Wyatt (Aust); The Nelson Twins (Aust); Empress Stah (Aust); The Birdmann (Aust); The Nelson Twins (Aust); The Bakery (Aust)	Keeth Diamond (Aust); The Dirty Brothers (Aust); The Nelson Twins (Aust); James Valentine Quartet (Aust); The Birdmann (Aust); Empress Stah (Aust); Luke & Wyatt (Aust); The Nelson Twins (Aust); Empress Stah (Aust); The Birdmann (Aust); The Nelson Twins (Aust)
Pump Shop	Rebecca De Unamuno (Aust); Sam Simmons (Aust); George Smilovici (Aust); Felicity Ward (Aust) & Claire Hooper (Aust); Sam Simmons (Aust); Jacques Barrett (Aust); Rick Shapiro (USA); Jeff Green (UK); Anthony Ackroyd (Aust); Matthew Hardy (Aust), Dave Jory (Aust), Mickey D (Aust) & Chris Franklin (Aust)	Rebecca De Unamuno (Aust); Greg Fleet (Aust) & Mickey D (Aust); Jacques Barrett (Aust) & Nick Sun (Aust); George Smilovici (Aust); Felicity Ward (Aust) & ClaireHooper(Aust); Sammy J (Aust), Tom Ballard (Aust) & Josh Thomas (Aust); Rick Shapiro (USA); Sam Bowring (Aust); Sammy J (Aust), Tom Ballard (Aust) & Josh Thomas (Aust); Matthew Hardy (Aust), Nick Sun (Aust), Sam Bowring (Aust) & Greg Fleet (Aust)
Bomb Shelter (Laugh Garage Comedy Club)	Darren Sanders (Aust), Oliver Phommavanh (Thai/Aust) & Mick Meredith (Aust); Tony Bailey & Jason ‘Rash’ Ryder (Aust); Garry Who & Arthur Writeus (Aust); Jason ‘Rash’ Ryder & Chris Radburn (Aust); Paul Warnes (UK/Aust) & Chris Wainhouse (Aust); Garry Who & Gary Bradbury; COMEDY JAM with Surprise Guests	Darren Sanders & Gary Bradbury (Aust); Sally Kimpton & Chris Wainhouse (Aust); Peter Meisel (USA/Aust) & Garry Who (Aust); Tony Bailey (UK/Aust) with Saxon Cheng & Darren Sanders (Aust); Gary Bradbury & Chris Wainhouse (Aust); Paul Warnes (UK/Aust) & Alan Glover (Aust); Mick Meredith (Aust) presents the COMEDY JAM
Mess Hall Outdoor Stage	Is It Just Me? - Wendy Harmer and Angela Catterns (Aust); Jackie Loeb (Aust); Simon Palomares Cooks Calamares (Aust);Jeff Green(UK); Tommy Dean (Aust/USA); Geraldine Quinn(Aust); Tommy Dean (Aust/USA)	Is It Just Me? - Wendy Harmer and Angela Catterns (Aust);Anthony Ackroyd (Aust); Simon Palomares Cooks Calamares (Aust); Geraldine Quinn (Aust); Daniel Townes (Aust); Felicity Ward (Aust); Jackie Loeb(Aust)
Barracks Courtyard	Radio Cockatoo with Helen Simons (Aust)	Radio Cockatoo with Helen Simons (Aust)
Guard House	The Ginger Meggs Exhibition (Aust)	The Ginger Meggs Exhibition (Aust)
Hilltop Outdoor Stage	The Dirty Brothers (Aust); The Birdmann (Aust); John Robertson (Aust); Comedy On The Edge - The Show	John Robertson (Aust); The Birdmann (Aust); Zack Adams (Aust); The Dirty Brothers (Aust); Comedy On The Edge - The Show (Aust)
Mould Loft	Comedy High School (Aust); Geraldine Quinn (Aust) Zoe Combes-Marr; Dave Bloustien (Aust); Sami Shah (Pakistan) – This act was cancelled; Fiona O’Loughlin (Aust); Erotic Fan Fiction (Aust) Six Quick Chicks (Aust); Jane Bussmann (UK); Rod Quantock (Aust); Beaconsfield: The Musical (Aust)	Sami Shah (Pakistan) – this act was cancelled; The Sleek Geek: Dr Karl (Aust); Six Quick Chicks (Aust); Erotic Fan Fiction (Aust); Fiona O’Loughlin (Aust); Jane Bussmann (UK); Peter Berner (Aust); Rod Quantock (Aust); Beaconsfield: The Musical (Aust)

== Proposed 2010 Program (Cancelled) ==
Venue	Saturday 16 October	Sunday 17 October
Harbour Stage	Manchoir (Aust); Lady Julia Morris in "Mad For A Cockatoo" (Aust); Fiona O'Loughlin (Aust); Ivan Brackenbury’s Hospital Radio Show (UK); Axis of Awesome (Aust); Jacques Barrett (Aust), Daniel Townes (Aust) & Tom Ballard (Aust); Penny Ashton (NZ), Jackie Loeb (Aust), Geraldine Quinn (Aust); The United States of Funny – The Girls: Julia Lillis, Maggie MacDonald, Danielle Stewart (US)	Manchoir (Aust); Jacques Barrett (Aust), Daniel Townes (Aust) & Tom Ballard (Aust); Lady Julia Morris in "Mad For A Cockatoo" (Aust); Jeff Green (UK/Aust), Simon Palomares (Aust) hosted by Mikey Robins (Aus); Axis of Awesome (Aust); Fiona O'Loughlin (Aust); Penny Ashton (NZ), Jackie Loeb (Aust), Geraldine Quinn (Aust); The United States of Funny – The Guys: Lee Camp, Owen Benjamin, Thai Rivera (US)
Turbine Hall	Heath Franklin – "Chopper’s F**king Bingo" (Aust); Michael Winslow... Comedy Legend (USA); Wil Anderson (Aust); Garry Eck (Aust), Tommy Dean (Aust), Paul Provenza (USA); Allah Made Me Funny – Mohammed Amer, Preacher Moss, Azhar Usman (USA); Kath & Kim live hosting the Foxy Gala (Aust); The Umbilical Brothers (Aust); The United States of Funny – The Guys: Lee Camp, Owen Benjamin, Thai Rivera (US)	Heath Franklin – "Chopper’s F**king Bingo" (Aust); Michael Winslow... Comedy Legend (USA); Wil Anderson (Aust); Garry Eck (Aust), Tommy Dean (Aust), Paul Provenza (USA); Kath & Kim live hosting the Foxy Gala (Aust); The Umbilical Brothers (Aust); Allah Made Me Funny – Mohammed Amer, Preacher Moss, Azhar Usman (USA); The United States of Funny – The Girls: Julia Lillis, Maggie MacDonald, Danielle Stewart (US)
Naval Store (Campus Comedy)	Campus Comedy Showcase (Aust); Princess Cabaret – Jo Bourke, Vivienne Egan, Amy Louise Hume, Brydie Lee-Kennedy, Courtney Powell, Emelia May, Sophie Miller, Alex Plim (Aust); The Anarchist's Stand-Up Showcase – Dave Bushell, Nick Caddaye, Tegan Higginbotham, Richard McKenzie (Aust); Project 52: Make Way For Ducklings – Bridie Connell, Ben Jenkins, Michael Hing, Simon Kraegen, Patrick Magee (Comedian), Carlo Ritchie, Tom Walker (Aust); The Anarchist Guild Social Committee Dave Bushell, Nick Caddaye, Tegan Higginbotham, Andrew McClelland, Richard McKenzie (Aust); Anyone for Tennis: "Jam It!" – Andrew Doodson and Jason English-Rees (Aust); Boomball Radio Plays – Benny Davis, Ben Jenkins, Andrew Garrick, Dave Harmon, Alex Lee, Mark Sutton, Adam Yardley, Susie Youssef (Aust)	same as Sat 16
Bomb Shelter	Best of the Magic Club – Pip Comic, Daniel Poile, Benny D., Liam Power (Aust); Tommy Little (Aust), Michael Hing (Aust), David Quirk (Aust); The Wagon – Ray Badran, Jacques Barrett, Jason Chong, Matt Dyktynski, Cam Knight, Sam McCool, Tom Oakley, Matt Okine, Jim Rochford (Aust); List Operators – Richard Higgins, Matt Kelly (Aust); Ian D. Montfort: "Touching the Dead" (UK); The Old Fella and the Young Fella – Branford Gruar, Rod Gregory with Mickey D (Aust); Jason Chong in "Reel Life"; The Wagon (Aust); Puppy Fight Social Club – Cale Bain, Dave Bloustien, Rebecca De Unamuno, Tom Lowndes, Jon Williams (Aust)	Best of the Magic Club (Aust); Tommy Little (Aust), Michael Hing (Aust), David Quirk (Aust); The Wagon (Aust); Ian D. Montfort: "Touching the Dead" (UK); List Operators (Aust); The Old Fella and the Young Fella (Aust); Jason Chong in "Reel Life"; The Wagon (Aust); Puppy Fight Social Club (Aust)
General Store	Comedy on the Edge – Zack Adams, Michael Connell, Jack Druce, Jimmy James Eaton, Ben Ellwood, Justin Lodge, Jarred Keane, Jerremy Keast (Aust); Indie Venues Showcase (Aust); Comedy on the Edge (Aust); Comedy at the Marble Bar – Richard Brophy, Amanda Gray, Amelia Jane Hunter, Simon Kennedy, Emma Markezic, Chris North, David Smiedt (Aust); Comedy on the Rox (Aust); A Mic in Hand – Manchoir (Aust); Comedy at the Marble Bar (Aust); A Mic in Hand (Aust); Comedy on the Rox (Aust)	Indie Venues Showcase (Aust); Comedy on the Edge (Aust); Comedy at the Marble Bar (Aust); Comedy on the Rox (Aust); A Mic in Hand (Aust); Comedy at the Marble Bar (Aust); A Mic in Hand (Aust); Comedy on the Rox (Aust); Comedy on the Edge (Aust)
Blacksmiths Shop	Six Quick Chicks – Vashti Hughes, Christa Hughes, Liesel Badorrek, Annabel Lines, Lucy Suze Taylor, Celia Curtis, Jude Bowler (Aust); Erotic Fan Fiction (Aust); Wicked Women – Kathryn Bendall, Imogen Kelly, Jackie Loeb, Kael Murray, The Margaritas (Aust); Philip Escoffey – "Six Impossible Things Before Dinner" (UK); Six Quick Chicks (Aust); Christa Hughes, Leonie Cohen – "Beer Drinking Woman" (Aust); Sammy J and Randy (Aust); Die Roten Punkte (Aust)	Six Quick Chicks – Vashti Hughes, Christa Hughes, Liesel Badorrek, Annabel Lines, Lucy Suze Taylor, Celia Curtis, Jude Bowler (Aust); Erotic Fan Fiction (Aust); Wicked Women – Kathryn Bendall, Imogen Kelly, Jackie Loeb, Kael Murray, The Margaritas (Aust); Philip Escoffey – "Six Impossible Things Before Dinner" (UK); Six Quick Chicks (Aust); Christa Hughes, Leonie Cohen – "Beer Drinking Woman" (Aust); Sammy J and Randy (Aust); Die Roten Punkte (Aust)
Pump Shop	Sam Bowring (Aust), Ronny Chieng (Aust), Lindsay Webb (Aust); The Laugh Garage Comedy Club Showcases – Marcus Ryan (Aust), Garry Who (Aust), Mick Meredith (Aust), Paul Warnes (UK/Aust), Bruce Griffiths (Aust), Chris Wainhouse (Aust) Gary Bradbury (Aust); George Smilovici – "Fidel and My Father" (Aust); Jeff Green (UK/Aust); Felicity Ward (Aust); Joel Creasey (Aust), Luke Heggie (Aust), The Nelson Twins (Aust), hosted by Subbie Valentine (Aust); Dave Thornton (Aust); The Laugh Garage Comedy Club Showcases (Aust); Mickey D (Aust)	Sam Bowring (Aust), Ronny Chieng (Aust), Lindsay Webb (Aust); The Laugh Garage Comedy Club Showcases – Marcus Ryan (Aust), Garry Who (Aust), Mick Meredith (Aust), Paul Warnes (UK/Aust), Bruce Griffiths (Aust), Chris Wainhouse (Aust) Gary Bradbury (Aust); George Smilovici – "Fidel and My Father" (Aust); Tom Gleeson (Aust); Felicity Ward (Aust); Joel Creasey (Aust), Luke Heggie (Aust), The Nelson Twins (Aust), hosted by Subbie Valentine (Aust); Dave Thornton (Aust); The Laugh Garage Comedy Club Showcases (Aust); Mickey D (Aust)
Air Raid Shelter (Comedy On The Edge)	Comedy in the Dark – Justin Lodge, Mark Williamson, Peter Green, Dolores (Aust)	Comedy in the Dark – Justin Lodge, Mark Williamson, Peter Green, Dolores (Aust)
Barracks Stage	Austen Found: The Undiscovered Musicals of Jane Austen (NZ); "Two Gentlemen of Lebowski" – Shakespeare's Greatest Parody, Act I (Aust); Andrew McClelland – "Truth Be Told" (Aust); Austen Found: The Undiscovered Musicals of Jane Austen (NZ); "Two Gentlemen of Lebowski" – Shakespeare's Greatest Parody, Act II (Aust); Dungeon Crawl – Ben McKenzie, Richard McKenzie (Aust)	same as Sat 16
Guard House	Peter Berner... The Cartoons (Aust)	Peter Berner... The Cartoons (Aust)
Convict Hill Stage	Luke and Wyatt (Aust); The Bedroom Philosopher (Aust); Geraldine Quinn (Aust); Smart Casual (Aust)	Mr Brambles (Aust); Ivan Brackenbury Hospital Radio Show (UK); Luke & Wyatt (Aust); The Bedroom Philosopher (Aust); Geraldine Quinn (Aust); Smart Casual (Aust)
Electrical Shop	Fiona Scott-Norman – "Needle and the Damage Done" (Aust); Simon Palomares (Aust); Will Durst (US); Rod Quantock (Aust); Beached Az Bro Live – World Premiere (Aust); "¡Sataristas!" – Paul Provenza (US), Will Durst (US), Rod Quantock (Aust), Lee Camp (US) hosted by Julian Morrow (Aust); Tommy Dean (Aust)	Fiona Scott-Norman – "Needle and the Damage Done" (Aust); Claire Hooper (Aust); Will Durst (US); Rod Quantock (Aust); Beached Az Bro Live – World Premiere (Aust); Peter Berner (Aust); Simon Palomares (Aust); Tom Gleeson (Aust)
The Circus Playground	Circus Playground (Aust)	Circus Playground (Aust)
