= Allah Made Me Funny (disambiguation) =

Allah Made Me Funny are an American comedy troupe.

Allah Made Me Funny may also refer to:

- Allah Made Me Funny: The Official Muslim Comedy Tour, 2005 American concert film of the comedy troupe
- Allah Made Me Funny: Live in Concert, 2008 American concert documentary film of the comedy troupe
- Allah Made Me Funny - Official Muslim Comedy Show - Live HMV Apollo, 2009 American concert film of the comedy troupe
