= Allah Made Me Funny - Official Muslim Comedy Show - Live HMV Apollo =

- Directed by: Pedro Cavalho
- Produced by: Waleed Jahangir
- Starring: Mohammed "Mo" Amer; Azhar Usman; Bryant "Preacher" Moss
- Production company: Tiffin Beats
- Release date: October 5, 2009 (United Kingdom)
- Running time: 111 minutes
- Country: United States
- Language: English

Allah Made Me Funny - Official Muslim Comedy Show - Live HMV Apollo is a 2009 American concert film. The live concert features American comedy troupe Allah Made Me Funny (Mohammed "Mo" Amer, Azhar Usman and Bryant "Preacher" Moss).

== Production and release ==
The film features Amer, Usman and Moss performing live stand-up at Hammersmith Apollo (known at the time as HMV Apollo) in Hammersmith, London organized by Mumbai Rouge on April 17, 2009.

The concert DVD was released on October 5, 2009.

== See also ==
- Allah Made Me Funny: The Official Muslim Comedy Tour
- Allah Made Me Funny: Live in Concert
