= Allah Made Me Funny: Live in Concert =

- Promotional film poster
- Directed by: Andrea Kalin
- Written by: Mohammed "Mo" Amer; Bryant "Preacher" Moss; Azhar Usman
- Produced by: Andrea Kalin; Azhar Usman; Bryant "Preacher" Moss
- Starring: Mohammed "Mo" Amer; Bryant "Preacher" Moss; Azhar Usman
- Cinematography: John Rhode; Bryan Sarkinen
- Edited by: David Grossbach
- Production companies: Unity Productions Foundation; Spark Media; Handshake Productions
- Distributed by: Truly Indie
- Release date: October 1, 2008 (United States)
- Running time: 82 minutes
- Country: United States
- Languages: Arabic; English
- Budget: $10,000

Allah Made Me Funny: Live in Concert is a 2008 American concert documentary film directed by Andrea Kalin and produced by Unity Productions Foundation. The live concert features American comedy troupe Allah Made Me Funny (Mohammed "Mo" Amer, Bryant "Preacher" Moss and Azhar Usman).

== Performers ==
As a child Azhar Usman lived "in mostly Jewish Chicago suburb of Skokie, Illinois", where he was born. His family emigrated to the United States from India. He is a former lecturer, community activist, and lawyer, and is often referred to as the 'Ayatollah of Comedy' and 'Bin Laughin'.

Mohammed "Mo" Amer is a Palestinian. The youngest of six children, he was born in Kuwait. When he was nine years old he emigrated with his family to Houston, Texas.

"Preacher" Moss is an African American, who converted to Islam. He is a comedian and writer. He was born in Washington, D.C.

== Documentary ==
The documentary that lasts 82 minutes features each performer for about 20 minutes. Most of the film was shot during their performance in Los Angeles, California in 2007, a year before the documentary was released. The remaining time features comedians at their homes, working on their computers, enjoying the time with their families. The spectators see the men working as "they prepare fresh material on cultural stereotyping, terrorism, flying post-9/11 and other tricky subjects not regularly regarded as funny business."

The comedians are trying to break out stereotypes that some people hold about Muslims:

Amer talks about how hard it is to yell for his nephew "Osama" when he disappears at a Wal-Mart, while Usman jokes about how someone in Iran must have a bustling business manufacturing American flags to burn, and how it's hard to get American Muslim kids excited about a religion whose major holiday requires them to fast for a month. But the bulk of the material here is either obvious or a little generic—especially the multiple jokes from each about how women are the real bosses in Muslim households, and it's the men who are really oppressed.

== Reviews ==
Laura Kern writes in New York Times "The title doesn't lie. These guys know how to tell a joke, often at the expense of their customs, religious holidays, families and themselves." John P. Meyer from Pegasus News compares Allah Made Me Funny to another show performed by Muslims Axis of Evil. Meyer writes: "Their material includes a wealth of "inside joke" stuff that will send Muslim members of the viewing audience into fits of laughter (judging by the recorded evidence), though it requires a bit of (provided) explanation for non-Muslim listeners." Noel Murray writes in The A.V. Club "For those itching to see a Muslim-themed variation on The Original Kings of Comedy, please enjoy Allah Made Me Funny, Andrea Kalin's document of a comedy tour featuring three Muslim comics". In their article named Poking Fun at Stereotypes In 'Allah Made Me Funny' NPR writes: "The comedians hope that both the American public and Muslims themselves can find ways to calm some of their fears through the sometimes controversial and often politically incorrect routine." Ed Gonzalez from Slant Magazine calls the film "Allah Made Me Not Funny". He continues: "In the style of Margaret Cho and Carlos Mencia, these men spit out highly politicized routines about the nexus of race and religion but never risk Cho and Mencia's vulgarity. This means they're also not as frequently off-putting, but they hardly bring anything new to the table." But he ends his review with "Of course, because they are pioneers of sorts, I'll give them a second chance to win me over." Serena Donadoni writes for The cinema Girl "In 2005, Albert Brooks went Looking for Comedy in the Muslim World, but it's the performers of Allah Made Me Funny who really found it." Ted Fry from The Seattle Times writes: "The hard work of being a stand-up comic doesn't need any extra obstacles, but the three comedians featured in "Allah Made Me Funny" share one that they're happy to laugh about: being Muslim in America."

== See also ==
- Allah Made Me Funny: The Official Muslim Comedy Tour
- Allah Made Me Funny - Official Muslim Comedy Show - Live HMV Apollo
