= Allah Made Me Funny: The Official Muslim Comedy Tour =

- Directed by: Tariq Jalil
- Produced by: Francisco Aguilar; Jaime Maldonado
- Starring: Azeem Muhammad; Azhar Usman; Bryant "Preacher" Moss
- Edited by: Arietis A/V
- Music by: Sidi Yassir; Tyson; Belike Muhammad
- Production company: Arietis A/V
- Distributed by: Meem
- Release date: June 15, 2005 (United States)
- Running time: 64 minutes
- Country: United States
- Language: English

Allah Made Me Funny: The Official Muslim Comedy Tour is a 2005 American concert film directed by Tariq Jalil, and produced by Francisco Aguilar and Jaime Maldonado. The live concert features American comedy troupe Allah Made Me Funny (Azeem Muhammad, and Azhar Usman, Bryant "Preacher" Moss).

== Production and release ==
The film features Muhammad, Usman and Moss performing live stand-up at The Improv in Brea, California.

The concert DVD was released on June 15, 2005.

== See also ==
- Allah Made Me Funny: Live in Concert
- Allah Made Me Funny - Official Muslim Comedy Show - Live HMV Apollo
