= Azhar Usman =

American comedian and actor

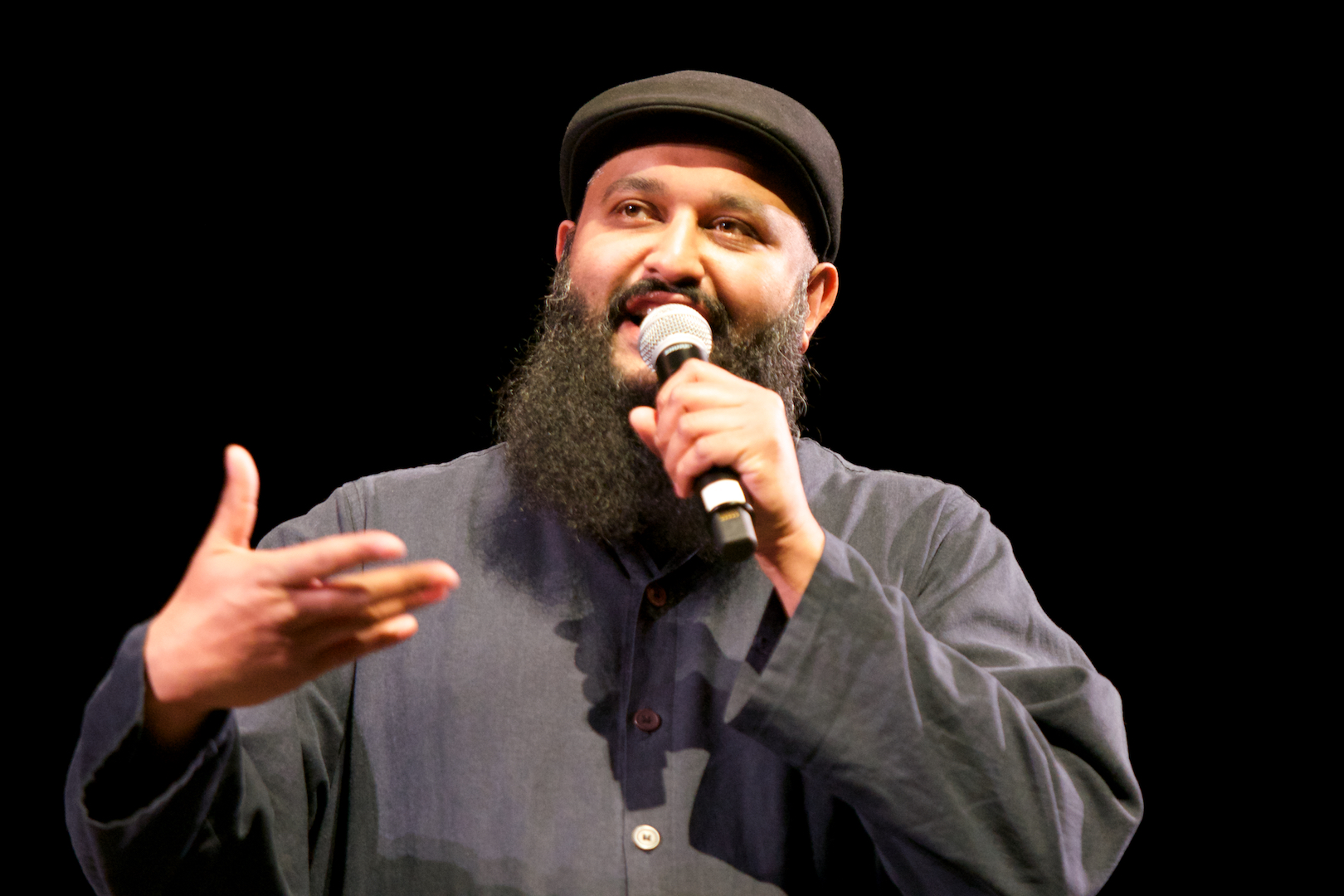
- Usman in 2017
- Born: Azhar Muhammad Usman; December 23, 1975 (age 50); Chicago, Illinois, U.S.
- Education: University of Illinois, Chicago (BA); University of Minnesota (JD)
- Notable work: Allah Made Me Funny, Ms. Marvel (miniseries), Ramy (TV series), Mo (TV series)
- Spouse: Jennifer Hoffman Usman (f/k/a Jen Jackson)

Comedy career
- Years active: 2001–present
- Medium: Stand-up, television, film
- Genres: Observational comedy, character comedy, sketch comedy, improvisational comedy
- Subjects: Islamic humour, Islamophobia, war on terror, Indian culture, political humor, Islam in the United States, multiculturalism, human interaction
- Website: azhar.com

Azhar Muhammad Usman (born December 23, 1975) is an American comedian, actor, screenwriter, and producer of Indian descent. He is a former lecturer, community activist and lawyer and has been referred to as the "Ayatollah of Comedy" and "Bin Laughin". He is best known as one third of comedy trio Allah Made Me Funny. In December 2020, Marvel Studios announced that Usman had joined the Marvel Cinematic Universe, agreeing to play Najaf on the cast of the studio's Ms. Marvel original streaming series for Disney+.

== Early life ==
Usman was born in Chicago, Illinois, to immigrant Indian Muslim parents. As a child, his family lived in the Chicago suburb of Skokie. In the 1970s, Usman's veterinarian father Zia Usman (a graduate of Aligarh Muslim University) and school-teacher mother Atiya Usman left Bihar, India, and emigrated to the United States.

In 1993, Usman graduated from Niles West High School in Skokie, Illinois. In 1996, he graduated with a BA degree in Communication and Spanish from the University of Illinois at Chicago, and in 1999 a Juris Doctor from the University of Minnesota Law School. He co-founded an Internet startup, then practiced law, and then started performing stand-up comedy.

He chose not to practice law after graduating from law school. Instead he did a dot-com start-up. He turned down six-figure salary offers to pay himself $35,000 working for his own dot com. He then folded the dot-com business and started practicing law briefly as a solo practitioner, whilst doing stand up as a hobby.

== Stand-up career ==
Since 1996, Usman had a friend who was an amateur comic and he would take him to a comedy club in Minneapolis. This inspired him to write an act in 2000. Usman started performing stand-up comedy in early 2001, a few months before September 11, initially as a hobby. However, in 2004, he had enough bookings to make a run at it. In early 2004, Usman stopped practicing law full-time. He has performed in many major cities in the U.S. as well as in over 20 countries on five continents.

In May 2004, Usman along with Preacher Moss and Azeem Muhammad (later replaced by Mohammed Amer in 2006) launched a comedy tour titled Allah Made Me Funny. He also co-wrote and produced a feature-length documentary/concert film based on the live tour, which was theatrically exhibited at Landmark Theatres in over a dozen top US markets in 2008. The film was directed by award-winning documentarian Andrea Kalin and funded by the Unity Productions Foundation. Allah Made Me Funny toured 30 U.S. cities during its first year, and also in Canada, Europe, Malaysia, Australia, New Zealand, South Africa, and the Middle East.

He has performed in 23 countries on five different continents. Usman and his comedy have been covered by over 100 major world media outlets, including The New York Times, The Economist, CBS Sunday Morning, CNN Headline News, and a whole episode of ABC Nightline. He has played original sketch comedy characters for MTV Networks, E4, and he was the creator and star of his own short-lived, semi-scripted, alternative web comedy show Tinku's World. He performed at Global Peace and Unity Event in the ExCeL Exhibition Centre in London. He also appeared in the independent film Mooz-lum. He has shared the stage with comedians including Dave Chappelle, Jim Gaffigan, Russell Peters, Todd Barry and Mitch Hedberg.

In 2008, CNN aired an hour-long special, entitled America's Funniest Muslim, on its Turkish affiliate, which included both performance clips and an extended Q&A session with Usman. In November 2008, he toured India, debuting at the American Center in New Delhi.

== Film career ==
Usman and Matt Sunbulli founded a production company called 9 Saints. (now defunct). In 2008, Usman produced a short film, The Boundary (directed by Julius Onah), which was selected as a finalist by the HBO Short Film Competition, and aired on that network several times. Usman also appeared in the critically acclaimed, independent feature film Mooz-lum (directed by Qasim "Q" Basir) in 2011, starring opposite Roger Guenveur Smith, Evan Ross, Nia Long, and film legend Danny Glover. He also appeared in several documentaries as himself, including It's My Country Too: Muslim Americans (directed by Ruhi Hamid for BBC), Me and the Mosque (directed by Zarqa Nawaz for CBC), and STANDUP: Muslim American Comics Come of Age (directed by Glenn Baker for PBS).

== Television career ==
In June 2013, Usman featured on an interfaith special, What's So Funny About Religion?, alongside Lewis Black and Mohammed Amer, which was broadcast on the CBS Television Network.

In February 2017, Usman appeared in the recurring role of Kkyman Candahar in the Amazon original series Patriot, created, written, and directed by Chicago screenwriter and producer Steven Conrad. He returned the following year to reprise his role in the second season of the show.

In 2018, he served as a Creative Advisor on the Hulu original series RAMY, created by and starring Egyptian-American standup comedian and actor, Ramy Youssef. In 2019, he served as an Executive Creative Advisor on the show's second season, as well as a staff writer, and co-wrote an episode of the show, co-starring Egyptian screen legend Amr Waked and two-time Academy Award winner Mahershala Ali, with the show's eponymous creator.

In December 2020, Usman was cast in an undisclosed role in the Disney+ streaming series Ms. Marvel, set in the Marvel Cinematic Universe.

== Comedy style ==
Usman talks about family histories and his American-Muslim childhood. He jokes about being mistaken for a terrorist, customs, religious holidays, families and himself.

Usman's character comedy includes "Sheikh Abdul, the radical imam", who intersperses vitriolic lectures with announcements about double-parked cars and meetings to re-elect the mosque committee that has remained unchanged for 37 years. There is also "Uncle Letmesplainyou", an antique Muslim who barely speaks English, has crazy political views and a voracious desire to share them, elbowing others aside to embarrass the community in television interviews. He also brags about the growth of Muslim America to people who don't care.

== Other activities ==
Usman is an artist and an activist and was a co-founding board member and director of The Nawawi Foundation, an Illinois non-profit dedicated to contemporary Islamic research and private Muslim think tank.

Usman serves as an Arts and Culture advisor to the Inner-City Muslim Action Network (IMAN) in Chicago. He also runs a boutique law practice.

Usman wrote a one-man show titled "Ultra American: A Patriot Act starring Azhar Usman" and premiered it at Silk Road Rising in Chicago in September 2016. The show was recommended for a Jeff Award.

In May 2017, Usman appeared on comedian Pete Holmes' podcast You Made It Weird, for a wide-ranging interview that covered many topics.

In the beginning of 2020, he announced the formation of Numinous Company, a boutique services firm offering creative producing and humor consulting services to fellow creatives, such as comedians and creators, startups, non-profits, and other clients.

In the summer of 2025, he taught a university level course at the American Islamic College, entitled "Rewriting the Script: The Rise of Muslim Creatives in Hollywood and Pop Culture."

== Awards and recognition ==
In March 2005, ABC Nightline ran an entire episode about Usman called "MUSLIM COMIC." In 2008, CNN's Turkish affiliate (CNN Türk) ran a one-hour special starring Usman, entitled "America's Funniest Muslim," which included a portion of live standup, followed by a lengthy Q&A session with the audience. In 2009, Usman was listed as one of The 500 Most Influential Muslims by Georgetown University's The Prince Alwaleed Center for Muslim–Christian Understanding and Royal Islamic Strategic Studies Centre of Jordan. In 2010, fellow comedian and legendary standup icon Dave Chappelle remarked: "Azhar Usman is untouchable, he's like a comedian from the future," after a show at The New Parish in Oakland, California. Usman has opened for Chappelle over 40 times since first meeting him in 2005.

== Filmography ==
=== Film ===
Year	Title	Director	Role or Title	Notes
1992	The Boy and the King	Dervis Pasin	Lead Voice Actor (Obaid)	Original animated feature film made in Egypt, then dubbed into English by Astrolabe Pictures (USA), produced by Osama Ahmed Khalifa Ella Animation
2005	It's My Country Too: Muslim Americans	Ruhi Hamid	Self	Documentary for BBC (also features Pakistani rockstar Salman Ahmad and his band Junoon)
2005	Me & The Mosque	Zarqa Nawaz	Self	Documentary for CBC (Canada)
2007	Babette	Julius Onah	Executive Producer	Short film
2008	The Boundary	Julius Onah	Executive Producer	Short film, sold to HBO (starring Alexander Siddig, Jacqueline Antaramian, Christopher Mann)
2008	STAND UP: Muslim American Comics Come of Age	Glenn Baker	Self	Documentary for PBS
2008	Allah Made Me Funny: Live in Concert!	Andrea Kalin	Self	Feature-length concert film (limited theatrical release) (produced by Unity Productions Foundation)
2010	Mooz-lum	Qasim "Q" Basir	Brother Hussein	Feature film (limited theatrical release) (starring Danny Glover, Nia Long, Evan Ross, and Roger Guenveur Smith)
2023	Out of the Loop	Michael Alexander	Self	Feature-length documentary about the history of Chicago standup
2026	Diary of a Muslim Cynic (WT)	Sarah Mokh	Imam	Debut feature from writer-director Sarah Mokh for script developed in the Sundance Institute Lab

=== Television ===
Year	Title	Director	Role or Title	Notes
2016	Hannibal Buress: Comedy Camisado	Lance Bangs	Creative Consultant	Netflix original standup comedy special
2017	Hasan Minhaj: Homecoming King	Christopher Storer	Creative Consultant	Netflix original standup comedy special (written and performed by Hasan Minhaj; special won a Peabody Award)
2017	White House Correspondents' Association Dinner	N/A	Writer	Contributed creative consulting and comedy writing to Hasan Minhaj's historic speech
2017	PATRIOT (Season 1)	Steven Conrad	Recurring Actor (Kkyman Candahar)	Amazon original series (created and written by Steven Conrad)
2018	Mo Amer: The Vagabond	Stan Lathan	Consulting Producer	Netflix original standup comedy special
2018	PATRIOT (Season 2)	Steven Conrad	Recurring Actor (Kkyman Candahar)	Amazon original series (created and written by Steven Conrad)
2019	RAMY (Season 1)	Various	Creative Advisor	Hulu original comedy series (created by and starring Ramy Youssef)
2019	Ramy Youssef: Feelings	Christopher Storer	Special Thanks	HBO original standup special (written and performed by Ramy Youssef)
2020	RAMY (Season 2)	Various	Staff Writer & Executive Creative Advisor	Hulu original comedy series (created by and starring Ramy Youssef) (co-wrote Episode entitled "Frank in the Future," starring Amr Waked and Mahershala Ali)
2020	Hannibal Buress: Miami Nights	Kristian Mercado	Consulting Producer	Independently produced and self-distributed standup comedy special (presented by Hannibal Buress' Isola Man Media)
2020	Beth Stelling: Girl Daddy	Payman Benz	Special Thanks	HBO Max original standup comedy special (written and performed by Beth Stelling)
2021	Mo Amer: Mohammed in Texas	Jay Chapman	Producer	Netflix original standup comedy special
2022	Ms. Marvel	Sharmeen Obaid-Chinoy; Adil and Bilall; Meera Menon	Recurring Actor (Najaf)	Marvel Studios original streaming series for Disney+ (based on the comic book, set in the Marvel Cinematic Universe, starring Iman Vellani as Ms. Marvel) (created by Bisha K. Ali, based on the character Kamala Khan, co-created by G. Willow Wilson, Sana Amanat, and Stephen Wacker, and comic book artists Adrian Alphona and Jamie McElvie)
2022	Mo	Slick Naim	Staff Writer	Netflix original comedy series (starring Palestinian-American standup comedian Mohammed "Mo" Amer)
2022	RAMY (Season 3)	Various	Staff Writer & Co-Executive Producer	Hulu original comedy series (created by and starring Ramy Youssef) (co-wrote Episode entitled "We Gave It All Up For Hot Dogs," starring Hiam Abbas and Amr Waked, and guest starring supermodel Bella Hadid, Sarita Choudhury, and Kate Thulin)
2022	Hasan Minhaj: The King’s Jester	Prashanth Venkataramanujam	Associate Producer	Netflix original standup comedy special (written and performed by Hasan Minhaj)
2023	Gavin Matts: Progression	Marcus Russell Price	Consulting Producer	All Things Comedy original standup comedy special (written and performed by Gavin Matts, executive produced by Bill Burr and Al Madrigal)
2023	Paul Elia: Detroit Player	Dan Ringey	Producer	YouTube original standup comedy special (written and performed by Paul Elia, executive produced by Bassem Youssef and Matt Rife)
2024	Ramy Youssef: More Feelings	Christopher Storer	Associate Producer	HBO original standup special (written and performed by Ramy Youssef)
2025	Mo (Season 2)	Slick Naim; Mohammed "Mo" Amer	Staff Writer & Co-Executive Producer	Netflix original comedy series (starring Palestinian-American standup comedian Mohammed "Mo" Amer) (wrote Episode entitled "Yes Chef, No Chef," starring Mo Amer, Teresa Ruiz, Omar Elba, Farah Bsieso, Tobe Nwigwe, Simon Rex, and guest starring rapper Slim Thug)
2025	Deli Boys	Nisha Ganatra; Oz Rodriguez; Fawzia Mirza	Recurring Actor (Feraz)	Hulu original comedy series (created by Abdullah Saeed)
2025	Number 1 Happy Family USA	Hannah Ayoubi; Maaike Scherff	Recurring Actor (Grandpa)	Amazon original animated comedy series (created by Ramy Youssef)
2025	Mo Amer: Wild World	Mo Amer	Co-Producer	Netflix original standup comedy special
2025	The Islamic States of America	Paul Elia	Creator, Executive Producer, Writer/Performer	YouTube original standup comedy film (executive produced by Azhar Usman, Paul Elia, Mohannad Malas, and Jay Chapman; featuring original track "Jesus Save Me Now" by Amir Sulaiman)

=== Theatre ===
Year	Title	Director	Role or Title	Notes
2016	ULTRA AMERICAN: A Patriot Acts	Aaron Todd Douglas	Playwright & Actor	One-man show written and performed by Azhar Usman, produced and presented by Silk Road Rising Theatre Company in Chicago (recommended for Jeff Award)

== Personal life ==
Usman is an Indian American Sufi Muslim. He is divorced with four children. His ex-wife is a lawyer. In the spring of 2020, it was announced on his personal Instagram account that he is now married to visual artist Jennifer Hoffman Usman (f/k/a Jen Jackson), a graduate of The King's Foundation School of the Traditional Arts.

== See also ==
- Allah Made Me Funny
- Islamic humour
- Indian American
- Islamic Neo-Traditionalism
- List of American Muslims
- List of Indian Americans
