= Number 1 Happy Family USA =

American animated series

#1 Happy Family USA
- Genre: Animated sitcom
- Created by: Ramy Youssef; Pam Brady
- Voices of: Ramy Youssef; Mandy Moore; Chris Redd; Alia Shawkat; Akaash Singh; Whitmer Thomas; Kieran Culkin; Salma Hindy; Randa Jarrar
- Country of origin: United States
- Original language: English
- No. of seasons: 1
- No. of episodes: 8

Production
- Executive producers: Ramy Youssef; Pam Brady; Mona Chalabi; Josh Rabinowitz; Andy Campagna; Ravi Nandan; Hallie Sekoff; Alli Reich
- Producers: Dave Newberg; Paula Haifley; Jes Anderson; Inman Young
- Running time: 26-31 minutes
- Production companies: A24; Cairo Cowboy; Wounded Poodle; Amazon MGM Studios

Original release
- Network: Amazon Prime Video
- Release: April 17, 2025 – present

#1 Happy Family USA is an American adult animated sitcom created by Ramy Youssef and Pam Brady for Amazon Prime Video. It follows the Husseins, an Egyptian-American Muslim family, as they navigate post-9/11 America. It premiered on April 17, 2025.

== Premise ==
The show follows the Hussein family of New Jersey, a non-suspicious patriotic and peaceful family, as they navigate the post-9/11 2000s.

== Cast and characters ==
=== Main ===
- Ramy Youssef as:
  - Rumi Hussein, a 12-year old Egyptian-American boy who struggles with coming to terms with puberty, his masculinity, his status as the worst cousin on the cousin leaderboard, and his crush on his teacher Mrs. Malcolm, while dealing with post-9/11 xenophobia.
  - Hussein Hussein, the father of the Hussein family, a halal cart owner and patriarch of the family who forces himself into a hyper-patriotic, pro-American identity in an attempt to convince America he is "one of the good ones".
- Salma Hindy as Sharia Hussein, a dentist's assistant and mother of Rumi and Mona and wife of Hussein. As opposed to her husband's attempts to assimilate completely, she takes pride in her status as a Muslim living in America.
- Alia Shawkat as Mona Hussein, Rumi's older sister, who is an academic overachiever with goals of getting into Harvard; this competitive attitude leads Hussein to remark her as "his favorite" multiple times. Mona is a closeted lesbian who fears coming out to her traditional family, much to the disappointment of her girlfriend, Gina.
- Mandy Moore as Mrs. Malcolm, the homeroom teacher of Rumi, Marcus, Dev, and Garrett, and the object of Rumi's romantic affection. She once had an affair with Michael Jordan and is a big fan of the Chicago Bulls; this leads to Rumi's idolization of the team as well, as well as his idolization of Vili Fualaau, who he aspires to be like.
- Chris Redd as Marcus, one of Rumi's best friends. He is an African-American boy with nerdy interests such as anime and Pokémon, but is often stereotyped by others, for example, as a star on the basketball team despite not even trying out. He teaches Rumi about code-switching and how to use it to his advantage.
- Akaash Singh as Dev, one of Rumi's best friends at school. An Indian-American, he and Rumi bond over their shared status and cultural similarities being from Brown immigrant families. He has a crush on Mona, not knowing her sexuality, and helps her with her campaign for school president, thinking of them together as like Benazir Bhutto and Asif Ali Zardari.
- Whitmer Thomas as Garrett, another close friend of Rumi's. He is a nerdy white boy with braces and constantly talks using acronyms. He lost his grandfather in 9/11.
- Kieran Culkin as Dr. Riley, a dentist and Sharia's boss, who he befriends. Over the course of the show, he converts to Islam, but wears a hijab due to misunderstanding of the hijab's status for women; despite this, he displays significant knowledge of Islamic culture and history. He was abandoned as a child and raised by beavers, who taught him to efficiently chew wood and swim, and led to his interest in teeth. Part of the reason for his friendship with the Hussein family is to fill the void left by his wife after she had an affair with an Applebee's waiter who she left him for.
- Randa Jarrar as Grandma, Sharia's mother, who constantly watches TV, is usually silent, and almost always speaks in Arabic. However, she is revealed to have knowledge of English. She is a lesbian who was closeted and was in an unhappy marriage with Grandpa, which produced Sharia; she later lectures Mona to not fall into the same life as her.

=== Recurring ===
- Azhar Usman as Grandpa, Sharia's strict, conservative, chain-smoking father. In the first episode, he dies of a massive heart attack after an argument at dinner with Sharia, and appears throughout the rest of the season as a ghost.
- Paul Elia as Uncle Ahmed, Hussein's happy-go-lucky and naïve brother who visits from Egypt to run the halal cart with Hussein. While the family is at the airport, he says an Islamic prayer for grandpa after finding out his death, not knowing that 9/11 has just happened, leading to him getting beaten by policemen, arrested, and almost sent to Guantanamo Bay, until Rumi makes a deal with George H. W. Bush. Despite being wrongfully imprisoned and repeatedly tortured, he retains his jovial outlook.
- Megan Stalter as Gina, Mona's girlfriend. They are in a long-term relationship, and Gina desperately wants Mona to come clean to her family about her sexuality and relationship with her, which Mona constantly avoids due to fear of her family's reactions and the possibility it will prevent her from attaining the status and academic and professional success she desires.
- Timothy Olyphant as Dan Daniels, a divorced, alcoholic, depressed, irresponsible FBI agent who moves in across the street from the Husseins. He is friendly to the family and considers Hussein a close friend; Hussein reciprocates, but largely out of fear of being profiled and arrested.

=== Guest ===
- Amy Landecker as Donna ("Egypt Is On the Phone")
- Bradley Whitford as Principal ("Daughter President")

== Episodes ==
No.	Title	Directed by	Written by	Original release date
1	"Nine Ten"	Griffith Kimmins	Ramy Youssef & Pam Brady	April 17, 2025
2	"#1 Vigil Mourners!"	Hannah Ayoubi	Josh Rabinowitz	April 17, 2025
3	"We Are Nothing!"	Maaike Scherff	Ramy Youssef and Pam Brady and Theresa Mulligan Rosenthal	April 17, 2025
4	"Egypt Is On the Phone!"	Maaike Scherff	Sabrina Jalees	April 17, 2025
5	"Very Good Hate Crime!"	Matthew Humphreys	Ahamed Weinberg	April 17, 2025
6	"Daughter President!"	Hannah Ayoubi	Ahamed Weinberg and Sabrina Mahfouz	April 17, 2025
7	"Inshallah Pubes!"	Matthew Humphreys	Josh Rabinowitz	April 17, 2025
8	"A Sleepover With Mr. President!"	Griffith Kimmins	Pam Brady & Mona Chalabi and Ramy Youssef and Ahamed Weinberg	April 17, 2025

== Production ==
=== Development ===
In March 2022, Amazon Prime Video gave the series a two-season order, with Ramy Youssef and Pam Brady set to create the series and executive produce, alongside A24 and Mona Chalabi.

=== Casting ===
In January 2023, Alia Shawkat, Salma Hindy, Randa Jarrar, Chris Redd, Akaash Singh, Whitmer Thomas and Mandy Moore were announced as series regulars. In March 2025, Kieran Culkin, Timothy Olyphant and Paul Elia were announced to be cast.

== Release ==
The series had its world premiere at South by Southwest on March 9, 2025.

== Reception ==
=== Critical reception ===
On the review aggregator website Rotten Tomatoes, 96% of 24 critics' reviews are positive. The website's critics consensus reads, "Packed with keen insights into the Arab American experience and even more off-color jokes, #1 Happy Family USA is a riotously funny animated comedy that might not be fit for the whole family but is a worthwhile tribute to it." Metacritic, which uses a weighted average, assigned the first season a score of 78 out of 100, based on 9 reviews, indicating "generally favorable" reviews.

=== Accolades ===
Year	Award	Category	Recipient(s)	Result	Ref.
2025	2nd Gotham TV Awards	Breakthrough Comedy Series	Pam Brady, Ramy Youssef, Andy Campagna, Mona Chalabi, Ravi Nandan, Josh Rabinowitz, Alli Reich and Hallie Sekoff	Nominated	
