= Mo (TV series) =

American comedy-drama television series

- Promotional poster for the first season
- Genre: Comedy drama
- Created by: Mo Amer; Ramy Youssef
- Starring: Mo Amer; Farah Busies; Teresa Ruiz; Tobe Nwigwe; Omar Elba
- Composers: Common; Karriem Riggins; Patrick Warren
- Country of origin: United States
- Original languages: English; Arabic; Spanish
- No. of seasons: 2
- No. of episodes: 16

Production
- Executive producers: Mo Amer; Ramy Youssef; Ravi Nandan; Hallie Sekoff; Solvan "Slick" Naim; Harris Danow; Luvh Rakhe
- Running time: 23–31 minutes
- Production companies: A24; Mo Productions; Cairo Cowboy; Netflix

Original release
- Network: Netflix
- Release: August 24, 2022 – January 30, 2025

Mo (stylized with all uppercase) is an American comedy-drama television series that premiered on August 24, 2022 on Netflix. The series stars Mo Amer as the titular character. The series is loosely based on Amer's own life as a Palestinian refugee living in Houston, Texas. It is co-created by Ramy Youssef and also stars Farah Bsieso, Teresa Ruiz and Tobe Nwigwe.

In January 2023, Netflix renewed the series for a second and final season, which premiered on January 30, 2025.

Mo was released to "widespread acclaim", is one of "Netflix's most celebrated comedies". It was credited as "Essential Viewing" by Mashable.

The first season of the show has a 100% critic score on Rotten Tomatoes.

== Premise ==
The show follows the eponymous Mo, a Palestinian refugee living in Houston, Texas, who is seeking asylum and citizenship in the United States.

== Cast and characters ==
=== Main ===
- Mo Amer as Mohammed "Mo" Najjar, the protagonist
  - Ahmad Rajeh as young Mohammed "Mo" Najjar (season 1)
- Teresa Ruiz as Maria, Mo's girlfriend
- Farah Bsieso as Yusra Najjar, Mo's mother
- Tobe Nwigwe as Nick, Mo's childhood friend
- Moayad Alnefaie as Hameed, Mo's friend
- Michael Y. Kim as Chien, Mo's tattooist and lean dealer (season 1)
- Lee Eddy as Lizzie Horowitz, the Najjars' immigration lawyer
- Cherien Dabis as Nadia Robinson (née Najjar), Mo's sister
  - Mariah Albishah as young Nadia Najjar (season 1)
- Omar Elba as Sameer Najjar, Mo's brother

=== Guest ===
- Paul Wall as a court room security guard
- Bun B as a Episcopal priest listening to Mo's confession
- Bassem Youssef as Abood Rahman, mobile store owner
- Matt Rife as embassy counter worker in the business suit
- Simon Rex as Guy, Maria's love interest and Mo's rival
- Macon Blair as Jack
- Johanna Braddy as Austin
- Solvan Naim as Malone, ICE agent
- Liza Koshy as Talia
- Slim Thug as fake bag customer
- Ralph Barbosa as other Mexican street vendor

== Episodes ==
Series overview
Season	Episodes	Originally released
1	8	August 24, 2022
2	8	January 30, 2025

=== Season 1 (2022) ===
No. overall	No. in season	Title	Directed by	Written by	Original release date
1	1	"Hamoodi"	Solvan "Slick" Naim	Mohammed Amer & Ramy Youssef	August 24, 2022
When the asylum seeking Palestinian Mo gets fired from this job in a mobile store in Houston, he resorts to selling merch and counterfeit products, much to the dismay of the people closest to him.
2	2	"Yamo"	Solvan "Slick" Naim	Adel Kamal	August 24, 2022
Scarred after a tough incident, Mo refuses to slow down and attends a wake with Maria. Legal tensions boil to the surface, complicating a family matter.
3	3	"Remorse"	Solvan "Slick" Naim	Luvh Rahke and Azhar Usman	August 24, 2022
Plagued by nightmares and stress, a torn Mo turns to instant relief. At a meeting with his new immigration lawyer, an unsettling truth is revealed.
4	4	"Moola"	Solvan "Slick" Naim	Harris Danow	August 24, 2022
Mo finds stability in a new gig until a merch deal goes south. Hoping to expand the shop, Maria meets with an investor, but the pitch doesn't go to plan.
5	5	"Tombstone"	Solvan "Slick" Naim	Nichole Beattie and Sophia Lear	August 24, 2022
Mo visits an estranged family member to obtain a document for the Najjars' asylum case. When Sameer gets into trouble the family unites to help.
6	6	"Holy Matrimony"	Solvan "Slick" Naim	Luvh Rahke and Harris Danow	August 24, 2022
Mo finds himself in a confusing situation whilst forced to work for Dante and keep it away from Maria and the rest of his family also right in the middle of Hameed's wedding.
7	7	"Testimony"	Solvan "Slick" Naim	Story by : Adel Kamal and Iturri Sosa; Teleplay by : Adel Kamal	August 24, 2022
As their asylum hearing date approaches, Lizzie preps the Najjars, and Yusra gets candid; anxious and depleted, Mo struggles to cope with his new reality.
8	8	"Vamos"	Solvan "Slick" Naim	Mohammed Amer & Sophia Lear	August 24, 2022
Yusra and Sameer unveil their business idea to Mo and invite him on board; Mo later cuts a deal with Buddy that leads him into uncharted territory.

=== Season 2 (2025) ===
No. overall	No. in season	Title	Directed by	Written by	Original release date
9	1	"Oso Palestino (the Palestinian Bear)"	Mohammed Amer	Mohammed Amer, Chris Gabo, Ramy Youssef	January 30, 2025
10	2	"Gone Fishing"	Solvan Naim	Harris Danow, Mohammed Amer, Ramy Youssef	January 30, 2025
11	3	"Yes Chef, No Chef"	Solvan Naim	Azhar Usman, Mohammed Amer, Ramy Youssef	January 30, 2025
12	4	"Hit the Road Jack"	Solvan Naim	Annas Salinas	January 30, 2025
13	5	"Thank You Jesus"	Solvan Naim	Jacqui Rivera, Mohammed Amer, Ramy Youssef	January 30, 2025
14	6	"Bandido de Tacos"	Solvan Naim	Chris Gabo, Mohammed Amer, Ramy Youssef	January 30, 2025
15	7	"Field of Dreams"	Mohammed Amer	Luis Sivoli, Mohammed Amer, Ramy Youssef	January 30, 2025
16	8	"A Call from God"	Mohammed Amer	Mohammed Amer, Harris Danow, Ramy Youssef	January 30, 2025

== Reception ==
=== Critical response ===
As of February 2025 the first season of Mo holds a 100% rating and the second season holds a 95% rating on Rotten Tomatoes.

The series has received critical acclaim for being one of the first major American television shows to portray a Palestinian-American refugee as the protagonist as well as highlighting the growing ethnic diversity of Houston.

=== Accolades ===
Accolades received by Mo
Award	Year	Category	Recipient(s)	Result	Ref.
Gotham Awards	2022	Breakthrough Series (Under 40 Minutes)	Mo	Won	
Independent Spirit Awards	2023	Best Lead Performance in a New Scripted Series	Mohammed Amer	Nominated	
Peabody Awards	2022	Entertainment	Mo	Won	
