= Tobe Nwigwe =

American musician

- Nwigwe in 2023

Background information
- Born: Tobechukwu Dubem Nwigwe
- Education: University of North Texas
- Genres: Southern hip-hop; Afrobeats
- Occupations: Rapper; songwriter; singer; actor
- Years active: 2016–present
- Spouse: Martica "Fat" Nwigwe
- Website: tobenwigwe.com

Tobechukwu Dubem "Tobe" Nwigwe (pronounced "toh-beh-CHOO-kwoo doo-BEM WEE-gweh") is an American rapper, singer and actor.

== Music career ==
Beginning in August 2016, Nwigwe began posting an original song and video every Sunday across social media. This led to a large social media following through his Instagram and YouTube posts and videos.

Nwigwe regularly collaborates with his wife.

Nwigwe appeared on the BET Hip Hop Awards 2018 Cypher. He is a featured artist on PJ Morton's album Paul, released on August 9, 2019 by Morton Records and Empire Records.

In 2019, Nwigwe performed on NPR's Tiny Desk Concert series. His music has garnered attention from Michelle Obama, who put his song "I'm Dope" on her workout playlist. In 2020, Nwigwe went viral on digital platforms for his song "I Need You To (Breonna Taylor)". He said God gave him a vision to do the song as a public service announcement. He performed his songs "Try Jesus" and "Eat" at the 2020 BET Hip Hop Awards. "Try Jesus" reached No. 4 on the Billboard R&B Digital Song Sales chart.

Nwigwe has collaborated with many other artists, including Pharrell Williams, television host Anthony "Spice" Adams, Paul Wall, Chamillionaire, Duckwrth, Big K.R.I.T., D Smoke, Black Thought, Royce Da 5'9", Nas, Jacob Banks, Justin Timberlake, Penny & Sparrow, Stephen Curry, CeeLo Green, 2 Chainz

Nwigwe's The Pandemic Project was released in 2020.

== Other works ==
Nwigwe appears in the Netflix series Mo as Nick, Mo's best friend since childhood. The show was created by and stars comedian Mo Amer.

He also starred as Reek in Transformers: Rise of the Beasts, to which he also contributed to the soundtrack.

== Personal life ==
Nwigwe is from the Alief neighborhood of Houston in the U.S. state of Texas.

He is of Nigerian descent, and hails from the Igbo ethnic group. He was raised Catholic, but later began attending nondenominational churches.

Tobe played high school and then college football at the University of North Texas. He was being considered for draft by the NFL, however, a lisfranc ligament tear left him unable to play. He then founded the nonprofit TeamGINI, a name derived from “Gịnị bụ mkpa gị??” which translates to “What’s your need?” in the Igbo language. TeamGINI aims to help families in need by giving them gifts that aid them in gaining financial literacy and independence. After encouragement from the motivational speaker Eric Thomas, Nwigwe began focusing on music.

Tobe is married to Martica Ivory "Fat" Nwigwe, née Rogers. They have five children: Ivory, Sage, Chukwueze, Chikodili and Jachike.

Tobe's first cousin is Kele Okereke from the UK band Bloc Party.

== Discography ==
- Tobe From The Swat album (ETA Records, 2017)
- The Originals (LP, Self-released, 2018)
- More Originals (LP, Tobe Nwigwe LLC, 2018)
- Three Originals (LP, Tobe Nwigwe LLC, 2019)
- Fouriginals (LP, Tobe Nwigwe LLC, 2019)
- Tobe From The Swat / The Live Experience (Double LP, Tobe Nwigwe LLC, 2019)
- Cincoriginals (LP, 2020)
- The Pandemic Project (EP, 2020)
- The Pandemic Experience | Live Global Broadcast (Double LP, 2020)
- At the Crib Arrangements (EP, 2021)
- The Monumintal Live Recording (2022)
- moMINTs (LP, 2022)
- moMINTs [At The Crib Version] (LP, 2022)
- Hood Hymns (LP, 2024)
- A MoMINT w/ Moncler Live at Rockefeller Center (EP, 2025)
- missed moMINTs Act 1: songs w/ moMINTum (EP, 2025)
- missed moMINTs Act 2: songs of endearMINT (EP, 2025)
- missed moMINTs Act III: songs with sentiMINT (EP, 2025)
- The Bridge (LP, 2026)

== Awards and nominations ==
Organization	Year	Award	Recipient or nominee	Result	Ref.
Emmy Awards	2021	Outstanding Commercial	"You Love Me"	Nominated	
Grammy Awards	2023	Best New Artist	Himself	Nominated	
NAACP Image Awards	2022	Outstanding Duo, Group or Collaboration (Contemporary)	Fye Fye	Won	
NAACP Image Awards	2022	Outstanding Music Video/Visual Album	Fye Fye	Nominated	
NAACP Image Awards	2022	Outstanding Hip Hop/Rap Song	Fye Fye	Won	
NAACP Image Awards	2023	Outstanding Music Video/Visual Album	Lord Forgive Me	Nominated	
Webby Awards	2023	Special Achievement	Himself	Won	
