= Americanish =

2021 American comedy film by Iman Zawahry

- Poster
- Directed by: Iman Zawahry
- Written by: Aizzah Fatima; Iman Zawahry
- Produced by: Roy Wol; Paul Seetachitt; Maddie Shapiro
- Starring: Aizzah Fatima; Salena Qureshi; Shenaz Treasurywala; Lillete Dubey; Mohammed Amer; Ajay Naidu; Godfrey; Kapil Talwalkar; George Wendt; David Rasche
- Production company: Studio Autonomous
- Distributed by: Sony Pictures International Productions
- Release dates: May 23, 2021 (CAAMFest); October 6, 2023 (United States)
- Running time: 91 minutes
- Country: United States
- Language: English

Americanish is a 2021 American comedy film written by Aizzah Fatima and Iman Zawahry, directed by Zawahry and starring Fatima, Salena Qureshi, Shenaz Treasurywala, Lillete Dubey, Mohammed Amer, Ajay Naidu, Godfrey, Kapil Talwalkar, George Wendt and David Rasche.

Americanish premiered at CAAMFest on May 23, 2021. It was given a limited theatrical release in the United States by Sony Pictures International Productions on October 6, 2023, and received positive reviews from critics.

== Plot ==
In Jackson Heights, Queens, career-driven Sam Khan navigates the pressures of being a secular Pakistani-Muslim-American woman while striving for success in the corporate world. Her younger sister, Maryam, a Harvard-bound medical student, balances her ambitions with her family's expectations for her to marry. Their lives are disrupted when their cousin Ameera arrives from Pakistan, eager to find a suitable husband and live out her dream of a traditional love story.

As the three women tackle romance, family obligations, and cultural identity, they face different challenges. Sam, rejecting the notion of marriage, finds herself drawn to Zane, a charming cop who challenges her cynicism about love. Maryam, initially reluctant to prioritize relationships, begins to develop feelings for Shahid, a fellow medical student, but struggles with self-doubt. Meanwhile, Ameera, whose sole focus is on finding a Pakistani-American doctor to marry, starts to question whether the traditional path she was raised to follow is truly what she wants, while falling in love with Gabriel, an African-American Muslim convenience store owner.

After facing discrimination in her workplace, Sam makes an ultimatum to her boss: if they want to keep her, they need to stop the discrimination. Maryam excels in her MCAT, forcing her to decide whether to follow her dream of attending Harvard or staying home. Ameera is faced with the prospect of marriage with an ideal "doctor husband."

After Gabriel proposes to Ameera, Sam and Maryam come together for her wedding. Sam presents Maryam with a monogrammed stethoscope, promising to support her in whatever decision she makes.

One year later, Ameera is pregnant and has her teaching certification. Maryam is in medical school at Harvard. Sam continues to work at her job in a better position than before and is now engaged to Zane.

== Cast ==
- Lillete Dubey as Khala
- Aizzah Fatima as Sam Khan
- Salena Qureshi as Maryam Khan
- Shenaz Treasurywala as Ameera
- George Wendt as Douglas Smarts
- Ajay Naidu as Jawad
- David Rasche as Jim
- Mohammed Amer as Zane
- Godfrey as Gabriel Jackson
- Kapil Talwalkar as Shahid
- Ioannis as Wedding Guest

== Release ==
The film premiered at CAAMFest on May 23, 2021. In January 2023, Sony Pictures International Productions acquired worldwide distribution rights to the film.

== Reception ==
The film has a 71% rating on Rotten Tomatoes based on seven reviews.

Joey Morona of The Plain Dealer gave the film a positive review and wrote, "A celebration of love, life and culture, the film exudes joy and hope. What’s more American than that?"

Sabina Dana Plasse of Film Threat rated the film an 8 out of 10 and wrote that it "examines the good and bad aspects of tradition while exposing the need for acceptance in society."
