= Here on Earth (TV series) =

Mexican political thriller television series

- Spanish: Aquí en la Tierra
- Genre: Political thriller
- Created by: Gael García Bernal
- Screenplay by: Jorge Dorantes; Kyzza Terrazas; Jacques Bonnavent
- Country of origin: Mexico
- Original language: Spanish
- No. of seasons: 2
- No. of episodes: 16

Production
- Production companies: La Corriente del Golfo; Fox Networks Group Latin America

Original release
- Network: Fox Premium Latin American
- Release: 19 April 2018 – September 4, 2020

Here on Earth (Spanish: Aquí en la Tierra), is a Mexican political thriller television series created by Gael García Bernal, from a screenplay by Jorge Dorantes, Kyzza Terrazas, and Jacques Bonnavent. The series is produced by La Corriente del Golfo, and Fox Networks Group Latin America. The first season consists of 8 episodes that were produced for eight weeks, at the end of 2017, between Mexico City and Montreal, Canada. The shows is premiered on 20 April 2018 on Fox Premium Latin American, while streaming it premiered on 16 April 2018 through the Fox Play app. It stars García Bernal, Alfonso Dosal, Tenoch Huerta, and Paulina Dávila.

In July 2018, the series was renewed for a second season, which was released on 16 July 2020 through the Fox Play app, and on television on 17 July 2020.

The series was nominated for best series at the 2018 Cannes Film Festival.

== Plot ==
The series is about the crimes and secrets of one of the most influential families in Mexico, how a humble young man jumps through social barriers to ascend the economic and political ladder, and the awareness of a young heir who fights for clarifying the murder of his father, in a Mexico very similar to the current one, but far from being the same.

== Cast ==
- Alfonso Dosal as Carlos Calles
- Tenoch Huerta as Adán Cruz
- Paulina Dávila as Elisa Rocha
- Daniel Giménez Cacho as Mario Rocha
- Ariadna Gil as Helena Ogarrio
- Yoshira Escárrega as América Sánchez
- Sofía Sisniega as Julia de la Peña
- Ezequiel Díaz as Juan Pablo Berrondo
- Gael García Bernal as El Pájaro
- Teresa Ruiz as Nadia Basurto
- Guillermo Ríos as Rufino Cruz
- Francisco Barreiro as Óscar Salgado
- Aidan Vallejo as Pato Rocha
- Andrés Almeida as Tinoco

== Episodes ==
=== Season 1 (2018) ===
No. overall	No. in season	Title	Directed by	Written by	Original release date
1	1	"Sangre y champaña"	Gael García Bernal	Gael García Bernal, Kyzza Terrazas & Jorge Dorantes	19 April 2018
The life of Carlos Calles is radically altered when his father, the anti-corruption prosecutor of the republic, distanced from him years ago, appears murdered. Meanwhile, the life of Adam Cruz, the son of the head of custody of Carlos's family, is also disturbed by popular uprisings in the community of San Mateo, where he lives, against the construction of a new airport that urges Governor Mario Rocha, stepfather of Carlos. Friends since childhood, despite their different social extractions, Carlos and Adam must face the new circumstances of their lives, putting their fears, ambitions and deeper moral dilemmas into play.
2	2	"Un pájaro"	Everardo Gout	Gael García Bernal, Kyzza Terrazas, Jorge Dorantes & Jacques Bonnavent	26 April 2018
Carlos doubts of the official version about his father's death and decides to start investigating on his own. Facing the insurgents of San Marcos, Adam makes a bold move to win the trust of Governor Rocha.
3	3	"Tiempos convulsos"	Everardo Gout	Gael García Bernal, Kyzza Terrazas, Jorge Dorantes & Jacques Bonnavent	3 May 2018
Carlos continues to investigate the alleged murderer of his father, but is in a dead end. The former President of Mexico, Vicente Hurtado, decides to support Rocha in the presidential race.
4	4	"San Marcos se arma"	Everardo Gout	Gael García Bernal, Kyzza Terrazas & Jorge Dorantes	10 May 2018
Rocha refuses to negotiate with his rivals in the internal presidential struggles, earning new enemies. Carlos discovers someone from his father's past and recovers the hope of discovering the truth. Adam insists on seeking a peaceful solution to the San Marcos conflict.
5	5	"Persona protegida"	Adrian Grunberg	Gael García Bernal, Kyzza Terrazas, Jorge Dorantes & Jacques Bonnavent	17 May 2018
Carlos travels to Canada in search of answers while the entire family of Adam attends a dinner offered by Rocha to thank Rufino, in gratitude for all the services provided. Elisa dangerously approaches Adam despite the presence of America.
6	6	"Bufotenina"	Mariana Chenillo	Gael García Bernal, Kyzza Terrazas & Jorge Dorantes	24 May 2018
The shadows of the past reach Helena's health. The United States reaches a drastic decision that frees Adam to live his relationship with Elisa. Upon learning of the trip to Canada, Rocha fears that Carlos goes too far in his investigations and decides to play a risky card.
7	7	"Déjà Vu"	Alonso Ruizpalacios	Gael García Bernal, Kyzza Terrazas & Jorge Dorantes	31 May 2018
An attack shakes the Mexican political scene and Rocha's life. Adam, impressed by this event, tries to find out if the San Marcos rebels were involved. Carlos' need for truth goes too far and ends in a fight that can cost him freedom.
8	8	"Prófugos"	Alonso Ruizpalacios	Gael García Bernal, Kyzza Terrazas, Jorge Dorantes & Jacques Bonnavent	7 June 2018
While Rocha tries to move some threads to save his stepson from jail, Carlos is consumed by doubt. Adam faces once again the leaders of San Marcos to ask them to regain common sense.

=== Season 2 (2020) ===
No. overall	No. in season	Title	Directed by	Written by	Original release date
9	1	"La Llorona"	Unknown	Unknown	16 July 2020
10	2	"Desaparecer es como sonreír"	Unknown	Unknown	23 July 2020
11	3	"Si no es por teléfono, será por televisión"	Unknown	Unknown	30 July 2020
12	4	"La paz perpetua"	Unknown	Unknown	7 August 2020
13	5	"Ratonera"	Unknown	Unknown	14 August 2020
14	6	"El regreso"	Unknown	Unknown	21 August 2020
15	7	"Arranca la campaña"	Unknown	Unknown	28 August 2020
16	8	"Mi cuerpo será un cádaver"	Unknown	Unknown	4 September 2020
