= It's Bruno! =

American Netflix comedy drama

- Genre: Comedy
- Created by: Solvan Naim
- Starring: Solvan Naim; Rob Morgan; Shakira Barrera
- Composer: Chris Hierro
- Country of origin: United States
- Original language: English
- No. of seasons: 1
- No. of episodes: 8

Production
- Executive producer: Solvan Naim
- Producers: Molly Conners; Amanda Bowers; Vincent Morano
- Cinematography: Seamus Tierney
- Editor: Ryan McIlraith
- Camera setup: Single-camera
- Running time: 12–21 minutes
- Production companies: Warner Bros. Television; Stage 13; SLI Entertainment; Phiphen Pictures

Original release
- Network: Netflix
- Release: May 17, 2019

It's Bruno! is an American comedy television series created by Solvan Naim that premiered on Netflix on May 17, 2019. The series stars Naim, Rob Morgan and Shakira Barrera. It's Bruno! follows the story of "a man and his beloved puggle dog, Bruno, as they stroll through the streets of Bushwick, Brooklyn." Bruno stars as himself, while Bruno's owner Malcolm is played by Naim.

In 2019, the series was nominated for Outstanding Short Form Comedy or Drama Series at the 71st Primetime Creative Arts Emmy Awards.

== Cast and characters ==
- Bruno as himself
- Solvan Naim as Malcolm Bartello
- Rob Morgan as Harvey
- Shakira Barrera as Lulu
- Johnnie Mae as Maureen
- Joe Perrino as Mario
- Donnell Rawlings as Carl
- Eden Marryshow as Chris
- Jade Eshete as Rosa
- Sam Eliad as Charlie
- Omar Scroggins as TJ
- Adriane Lenox as Jizzel
- Kathiamarice Lopez as Leslie
- Devale Ellis as Nelson
- Eddie J. Hernandez as Billy Bailando
- Anthony L. Fernandez as Barry
- Anthony Valderrama as Cuban Tone
- Katie Rich as Ranger Debecki
- David Lee Denny, Jr. as Parent #1

== Episodes ==
No.	Title	Directed by	Written by	Original release date
1	"Operation Turkey Meat"	Solvan Naim	Solvan Naim	May 17, 2019
2	"Sh*t and Run"	Solvan Naim	Solvan Naim	May 17, 2019
3	"An Angie Is Born"	Solvan Naim	Solvan Naim	May 17, 2019
4	"Lovely Lulu"	Solvan Naim	Solvan Naim	May 17, 2019
5	"War of the Walkers"	Solvan Naim	Solvan Naim and David Ebert	May 17, 2019
6	"Rock Bottom"	Solvan Naim	Solvan Naim and David Ebert	May 17, 2019
7	"Ranger Danger"	Solvan Naim	Solvan Naim and David Ebert	May 17, 2019
8	"Welcome Bruno"	Solvan Naim	Solvan Naim and David Ebert	May 17, 2019

== Production ==
=== Development ===
On April 11, 2019, it was announced that Netflix had given the production a series order for an eight-episode first season. The series was created by Solvan Naim, who stars and executive produces. Production companies involved with the series were slated to consist of Stage 13, SLI Entertainment and Phiphen Pictures.

=== Casting ===
Alongside the series order announcement, it was confirmed that Solvan Naim, Rob Morgan and Shakira Barrera would star in the series.

=== Filming ===
Principal photography for the first season took place in Ridgewood, Queens, New York in 2018.

== Reception ==
=== Critical response ===
The review aggregator website Rotten Tomatoes reported a 100% approval rating for the first season with an average rating of 7.5/10, based on 5 reviews.

== Release ==
=== Marketing ===
On May 3, 2019, the official trailer for the series was released.
