= Slick Naim =

Algerian-American rapper, director, and actor

Solvan "Slick" Naim is an Algerian-American rapper, writer, actor, and director. He is known for creating, writing, and starring in the Netflix comedy series It's Bruno! (2019). He had also directed episodes of The Blacklist, Power, Mo, Snowfall, The Equalizer, and Daredevil: Born Again.

Naim released his rap album Proof of Concept on 17 May 2019.

== Early life and childhood ==
Naim was born in New York City to a Jewish father, Norman Hirsch, and an Arab mother, who immigrated from Algeria to work in the United States. His parents divorced shortly after his birth. Growing up, he went "back and forth" between Washington Heights, where his father lived, and Queens, where his mother lived. He was assigned the moniker "Slick" by his classmates in middle school because he was always finding ways to get out of class early, and get better grades.

Naim started writing songs and rap from an early age. As a teenager, he wrote his first-ever track, a six-minute song "with no hook" about "this kid from the hood who makes it big in music and one of his boys gets a beat down by the police for no reason." He moved to Bushwick once he turned eighteen "back when rent was $1,000 for a two bedroom". While writing and creating music, he worked as a door-to-door salesman for energy providers, and as a personal trainer at various fitness establishments, including Lucille Roberts. He also worked at restaurant chains such as Dave & Busters and ESPN Zone. During this time, he adopted his first dog, Bella, from a rescue in The Bronx. In an interview with Vibe, Naim recalled being forced to move out from one of his Bushwick apartments because of gentrification, after his rent was increased by seventy percent. "I've seen it left and right, the police evicting people and putting their things in the street. Next thing you know everything gets renewed and we got people from Wisconsin moving in," he said.

Eventually, Naim secured a lease for a much bigger apartment, and adopted two more dogs: Bruno, another rescue from The Bronx, and Angie, a Midtown Manhattan rescue. Bruno later inspired Naim to create It's Bruno! for Netflix, and played the eponymous role in the series.

Naim graduated from New York University's Clive Davis School of Recorded Music.

== Career ==
=== 2013–2020: Directorial debut and the making of It's Bruno! ===
At twenty two years old, Naim became the youngest producer to register with the New York State Governor's Office of Motion Picture and Television. He wrote, co-directed, edited and produced Full Circle (2013), his first feature-length film which won five festival awards, and was acquired by eOne. The film, operating on a limited budget, was crowdfunded through Kickstarter, and featured aspiring Brooklyn actors. It was shot across Bushwick, with Tony's Pizzeria, a local eatery, serving as the production headquarters. Naim credited Tony's for being one of the "earliest supporters" of the project. Naim also wrote and directed the short film Stanhope (2013) which won four festival awards at the NBCUniversal Short Cuts Festival, American Black Film Festival, and Woodstock Film Festival.

In 2015, Sony Pictures selected Naim as a finalist in their Diverse Directors TV Program. He was later selected by FOX and NBC for their TV Director programs. He served as the second unit director for the Baz Luhrmann's musical drama The Get Down (2016). He went on to direct episodes of The Blacklist (2013), Blindspot (2015), and FX's Snowfall (2017).

In 2014, while working on another project, Naim noticed that Bruno, his puggle rescue, would sit beside him and make funny faces. He found Bruno's facial expressions and general demeanour to be "hilarious," so he started filming the dog. In 2015, he created a 10-minute short about going to the supermarket with Bruno. Later that year, Naim wrote, filmed, and edited the first four episodes of It's Bruno! (2019) in his Bushwick neighbourhood, showcasing "everyday quirks that only dog owners will understand." Based on these episodes, he envisioned and documented a series roll-out, which he began to shop around with production houses. After facing "a lot of rejection," the project was greenlit by Stage 13, a Warner Bros. division. The series development was delayed, owing to the merger between Warner Brothers and AT&T. Eventually, It's Bruno! was taken to Netflix and the idea was well received. Molly Conners, Amanda Bowers, and Vincent Morano were brought in as producers. Principal photography took place in 2018 in Ridgewood, Queens, New York.

On April 11, 2019, Netflix announced a series order for It's Bruno! with an eight-episode first season, starring Rob Morgan and Shakira Barrera alongside Naim and his canine companion. Naim told People that some anecdotes featured in the show were "made up" or "greatly exaggerated" but most of them were "pulled from real experiences" he encountered while walking Bruno in Bushwick. He hoped that It's Bruno! would "resonate with those who know the deep friendship dogs can provide," and help viewers understand the "inner workings of Brooklyn and pet ownership." Naim called Bruno the “best actor of the series, both on-camera and off." According to him, the dog "outperformed the trained animals on set," never missing a mark and "always ready to share a smile with his cast mates."

It's Bruno! premiered on 17 May 2019, and was nominated for Outstanding Short Form Comedy or Drama Series at the 71st Primetime Creative Arts Emmy Awards.

In 2019, on the premiere day of It's Bruno!, Netflix announced that Naim will be developing an untitled hip-hop movie musical based on William Shakespeare's Romeo and Juliet set against the urban rhythms of Brooklyn, New York. He co-wrote the script with Dave Broome, who also served as the producer, alongside Yong Yam (25/7 Productions), and Shakim Compere and Queen Latifah (Flavor Unit Entertainment). Executive producers included Will Smith, James Lassiter and Caleeb Pinkett (Overbrook Entertainment). Naim described the musical as a love story between a struggling musician and a waitress; both characters have dreams and aspirations beyond their traditional nine to five, and are bound by circumstances preventing them from doing what they love.

Naim also directed episodes of Animal Kingdom (2016–2022), Starz's Power (2018–2019), Tell Me a Story (2018–2019), and L.A.'s Finest (2019–2020), a spin-off of the Bad Boys franchise.

=== 2020–present: Critical acclaim for Mo and other projects ===
Naim co-directed thirteen episodes of Mo (2022–2025) with Mohammed Amer. The show follows the trials and tribulations of a Palestinian family (Najjars) seeking U.S. citizenship. He was also the executive producer for the second and final season which premiered in January 2025 on Netflix to widespread critical acclaim.

Clint Worthington, writing for Roger Ebert, praised the creative team behind Mo, including Naim, for "keeping the faith" in "insightful" Muslim-American storytelling and maintaining "an effective balance of ebullience and pathos." Ayishah Ayat Toma of Gazzetely said that "Naim's approach reveals a deep understanding of character emotional landscapes, allowing comedic moments to exist alongside intense personal struggles." She said Naim's direction "represents contemporary television storytelling, where character-focused narratives invite empathy through genuine experiences." In their review of the season, Variety commended Naim for finding "a loose rhythm that swings between the Najjars and occasional flashbacks to Mo's childhood when Mo's father was still alive with lived-in ease."

Naim, along with the Mo team, won the 2022 Gotham Independent Films Award for Breakthrough Series Under 40 Minutes, and 2022 Peabody Award. The award profile published on Peabody's official website said that "the precarity of being an asylum-seeking refugee in the United States may not immediately feel like fodder for a half-hour streaming comedy, and yet Mo [offers] a hilarious exploration of what it means to move through the world with the constant knowledge that your entire life may well disappear from one day to the next."

== Personal life ==
Naim is married to paediatric occupational therapist Reema Naim (née Durrani). They have two children. Reema's mother is a member of Saudi Arabian royalty. She has starred in five of Naim's music videos, and also directed one of them.
