= The Muslims Are Coming! =

- Directed by: Negin Farsad; Dean Obeidallah
- Starring: Negin Farsad; Dean Obeidallah
- Production company: Vaguely Qualified Productions
- Distributed by: Filmbuff
- Release date: September 12, 2013 (United States)
- Running time: 81 minutes
- Country: United States
- Language: English

The Muslims Are Coming! is a 2013 American comedy documentary film co-directed and co-starring Negin Farsad and Dean Obeidallah. It follows a team of Muslim-American comedians as they tour the American South and Southwest performing free stand-up comedy shows, and engaging in community activities, with an aim to "reach out to Middle America" and counter Islamophobia.

== Synopsis ==
The film opens with a montage of television and radio clips of comments from figures such as Frank Gaffney, Herman Cain, Ann Coulter, Bryan Fischer, Pat Robertson, Glenn Beck, Bill O'Reilly, Bill Maher, and Donald Trump expressing fear of Islam, or mistrust of Muslims.

Farsad and Obeidallah explain what motivated them to attempt to change the negative perception of Muslims in America: for Farsad it was claims that Obama was a secret Muslim (with its implication that being Muslim was in itself something negative); and for Obeidallah it was the virulence of the opposition to the "Ground Zero Mosque".

In Columbus, Georgia, they visit a gun show and perform in a bar. They perform in Gainesville, Florida.

In Lawrenceville, Georgia, they set up a "Ask a Muslim Booth" in the town center. At the Islamic Center of Columbus (also known as Masjid Al-Jannah), they stop to have iftar. At AMF Peach Lanes in Columbus, they invite community members to "Bowl with a Muslim".

After performing in Birmingham, Alabama, they invite passers-by to play "Name That Religion" where they try to guess if a quote read to them came from the Old Testament, New Testament, or the Koran.

In Tupelo, Mississippi, they attempt to get on an American Family Association radio show. After being denied their request to get on the air, they drop in on the AFA headquarters and have an audience with the General Manager Dr. Buster Williams.

Back in Lawrenceville, they visit Bulls-Eye Indoor Range & Gun Shop to shoot guns.

In Murfreesboro, Tennessee, they visit the Islamic Center of Murfreesboro (the site of a controversy beginning in 2010) and perform at Middle Tennessee State University.

In Tucson, Arizona, they perform at El Casino Ballroom.

In Salt Lake City, Utah, they perform at The Complex, and in front of the Salt Lake Temple they hold a sign inviting passers-by to "Hug a Muslim".

== Individuals involved in production ==
=== Cast of comedians ===
Muslim comedians whose performances are featured in the film include Dean Obeidallah, Negin Farsad, Maysoon Zayid, Aron Kader, Omar Elba, Preacher Moss, Kareem Omary. Non-Muslim comedians featured include Scott Blakeman and Janeane Garofalo.

=== Featured celebrities ===
The following celebrities, pundits, activists, and religious figures are featured in the film discussing anti-Muslim bigotry in America and/or commenting on the power of comedy:

- David Cross
- Rachel Maddow
- Aasif Mandvi
- Soledad O’Brien
- Jon Stewart
- Ali Velshi
- Colin Quinn
- Lizz Winstead
- Janeane Garofalo
- Rep. Keith Ellison
- Cenk Uygur
- Lewis Black
- Imam Shamsi Ali
- Maz Jobrani

== Release ==
The film premiered at the Austin Film Festival where it received the "Comedy Vanguard Audience Award".

The Muslims Are Coming! was released in select cities in September 2013 including New York City, Los Angeles, Chicago, Boston, Seattle and New Brunswick. It became available on 24 September 2013 through iTunes, Amazon downloads and video on demand. It was released on Netflix on 21 January 2014.

== Reception ==
=== Accolades ===
| Year | Award | Organization | Category | Result |
|---|---|---|---|---|
| 2012 | Audience Awards | Austin Film Festival | Comedy Vanguard Audience Award | Won |

Entertainment Weekly and the Chicago Tribune named it as a film to catch in fall 2013.

The Austin Chronicle made it a critic's pick, calling the film: "...really effing funny."

=== Reviews ===
The Muslims Are Coming! received a mixed reception from film critics. Review aggregate website Rotten Tomatoes reports the film as holding an overall 53% positive approval rating based on 15 reviews, and a rating average of 5.2 out of 10. At Metacritic, which assigns a weighted mean rating out of 0–100 reviews from film critics, the film has a rating score of 48 based on 9 reviews, classified as a "Mixed or average" reviewed film.

Frank Scheck, in The Hollywood Reporter, wrote that "[a]lthough not wholly successful in its sociological aspirations, the film does provide both considerable laughs and food for thought. [...] The film wanders at times into trivial territory [...] And it delves into all-too-familiar terrain[...] But it nonetheless makes its important points in entertaining fashion, and the onscreen commentary by a gallery of figures [...] is both thoughtful and funny." Nick A. Zaino III of The Boston Globe felt that the film was "at its best when the comedians talk to real people outside the controlled environment of a stage."

Jordan Hoffman in the New York Daily News called it a "mild, moderately interesting road documentary", and stated that "[t]he unfortunate thing is ... these folks aren’t all that funny. [...] Viewers outside the tristate area may have their minds blown. The rest of us may be only mildly amused." Ben Sachs, writing in the Chicago Reader, observed that "evidently, mediocre stand-up can be surprisingly effective in promoting ethnic and religious tolerance. For better and for worse, this feels less like a feature film than a stretched-out Daily Show segment."

Peter Rainer of The Christian Science Monitor gave the film a C− grade saying "[t]he comedy routines are so-so (though the falling-in-the-aisles reaction shots tell another story) and the comics’ patchwork odyssey often derails into irrelevancies". Writing for The New York Times, Miriam Bale gave the film two and a half stars out of five, and said that "this well-intentioned 'docu-comedy' (as the filmmakers label it in publicity notes) is not very funny."

Dean Essner of Slant Magazine gave the film gave the film one and a half stars out of four, calling it "a film that wastes a fascinating premise on its main characters' obsession with reducing everything to a joke, the attempted humor is neither ground- nor barrier-breaking.

Annlee Ellingson of the Los Angeles Times commented that the directors' "try to keep it light, even a little cheesy, in the face of at-times infuriating anti-Muslim attitudes — an approach that best serves their goal of giving America 'this big Muslim hug.'"
