= Humour in Islam =

Islamic views on acceptable and unacceptable humour

Humour in Islam refers to the act of doing things that are considered humorous under the guidelines set by the Quran and the Islamic prophet Muhammad.

== Islamic sources on humour ==
Laughter, fun, and joking are permissible in Islam provided guidelines from the Quran and hadith are followed. For humour to be in accordance with Islam, the joke should not be blasphemous and should be within the limits of adab (manners).

=== Hadiths ===
1) Muhammad used to smile, rather than laugh. His wife Aisha said:

"I never saw the Messenger of Allah laugh fully to such an extent that I could see his uvula. He would only smile."

— Sunan Abu Dawood Volume 3, Book 41: Kitab Al-Adab (General Behavior), Hadith Number 5079; Sahih al-Bukhari, Volume 8, Book 73: Kitab Al-Adab (Good Manners and Form), Hadith Number 114.

2) Muhammad's smile and his companions' laughing sessions. Jabir ibn Samurah narrated:

Simak ibn Harb asked Jabir ibn Samurah, "Did you sit in the company of the Messenger of Allah?" He said: Yes, very often. He (the Prophet) used to sit at the place where he observed the morning or dawn prayer till the sun rose or when it had risen; he would stand, and they (his Companions) would talk about matters (pertaining to the days) of ignorance, and they would laugh (on these matters) while (the Prophet) only smiled.

— Sahih Muslim, Book 4: Kitab Al-Salat (Book of Prayers), Chapter 92, Hadith Number 1413.

3) Aisha also narrated:

The Prophet in his fatal illness, called his daughter Fatima and told her a secret because of which she started weeping. Then he called her and told her another secret, and she started laughing. When I asked her about that, she replied, "The Prophet told me that he would die in his fatal illness, and so I wept, but then he secretly told me that from amongst his family, I would be the first to join him, and so I laughed."

— Sahih Muslim, Volume 4, Book 56: (Virtues and Merits of the Prophet and his Companions), Hadith Number 819.

4) Muhammad encouraged to be jestful with your family. Ibn Mas'ud said that Muhammad said:

"Mix with the people on the condition that your Deen is not jeopardized, and be jestful with the family."

— Sahih al-Bukhari, Chapter 81: To be cheerful with the people.

5) Abu Dharr al-Ghifari narrated that Muhammad said:

"...I indeed saw the Messenger of Allah laugh till his front teeth were exposed."

— Sahih Muslim, Book 1: Kitab Al-Iman (The Book of Faith), Chapter 83, Hadith Number 365.

6) Muhammad discouraged laughing at inappropriate times. Al-Aswad ibn Yazid narrated:

Some young men from the Quraish visited Aisha as she was in Mina and they were laughing. She said: "What makes you laugh?” They said: Such and such person stumbled against the rope of the tent and he was about to break his neck or lose his eyes. She said: “Don’t laugh for I heard Allah's Messenger (may peace be upon him) as saying: If a Muslim runs a thorn or (gets into trouble) severe than this, there is assured for him (a higher) rank and his sins are obliterated."

— Sahih Muslim, Book 32: Kitab Al-Birr was-Salat-I-wa'l-Adab (The Book of Virtue, Good Manners and Joining of the Ties of Relationship), Chapter 12, Hadith Number 6237.

7) Muhammad encouraged jokes about the truth. Abu Hurairah said:

When some of his companions said to Prophet Muhammad: "O Prophet Muhammad, yet, you also joke with us!" He replied: "Yes, I do. But I only tell the truth."

— at-Tirmidhi.

8) Muhammad discouraged lying to make people laugh.

"Woe to the one who speaks and tells lies in order to make the people laugh; woe to him, woe to him."

— at-Tirmidhi, Hadith Number 2315; Sunan Abu Dawood, Hadith Number 4990.

9) Muhammad discouraged frightening anyone as a joke.

Once when travelling, one of the sahabah fell asleep, the others got some rope and tied him up. The man woke up and was frightened so Prophet Muhammad said: "It is not lawful to any Muslim to frighten another Muslim."

— Ibn Hajar; Sunan Abu Dawood.

10) Muhammad discouraged joking or laughing excessively.

Muhammad said:

"Do not laugh too much, for laughing too much deadens the heart."

— Saheeh al-Jaami’, 7312; al-Tirmidhi, 2305; Ibn Majah, 4193

Muhammad discouraged backbiting and inappropriate language:

"(Backbiting is) your mentioning about your brother something that he dislikes."

— Sahih Muslim, Book 32: (The Book of Virtue, Good Manners and Joining of the Ties of Relationship), Chapter 18, Hadith Number 6265.

"The Muslim does not slander, curse, speak obscenely or speak rudely."

— Tirmidhi

==== Jokes of Muhammad ====
Muhammad is reported by Tirmidhi to have said: "Why are there no old women in heaven? Because they become young girls when they get there."

Other instances include a man who came up to Muhammad to ask him to give him a beast to ride. Muhammad jokingly told him, "I will give you the offspring of a she-camel to ride." He said, "O Messenger of Allah, what will I do with the offspring of a she-camel?" Muhammad said: "Are riding-camels born except from she-camels?" (Reported by Ahmad ibn Hanbal, Abu Dawud and al-Tirmidhi, as Sahih).

=== Companions ===
The Muhammad's companions would limit jokes, joke at appropriate times, and be cautious of joking.

Umar ibn al-Khattab narrated that:

"Whoever laughs too much or jokes too much loses respect, and whoever persists in doing something will be known for it."

—

Sa`d ibn Abi Waqqas said:

"Set a limit to your jokes, for going to extremes makes you lose respect and incites the foolish against you."

—

Umar ibn Abd al-Aziz said:

"Fear joking, for it is folly and generates grudges."

—

In al-Adab al-Mufrad, Bukhari reports from Bakr ibn 'Abdillah who said: "The Companions of the Prophet used to throw melon-rinds at one another, but when the matter was serious, they were the only true men."

=== Quran ===
"And that it is He who makes [one] laugh and weep"

— Surah An-Najm 53:43 ^{-Sahih International}

- The Quran discourages insulting anyone.

"O believers! Do not let some ˹men˺ ridicule others, they may be better than them, nor let ˹some˺ women ridicule other women, they may be better than them. Do not defame one another, nor call each other by offensive nicknames. How evil it is to act rebelliously after having faith! And whoever does not repent, it is they who are the ˹true˺ wrongdoers."

— Surah Al-Hujurat 49:11

- The Qur'an discourages mocking Islam.

"If you question them, they will certainly say, “We were only talking idly and joking around.” Say, “Was it Allah, His revelations, and His Messenger that you ridiculed?” Make no excuses! You have lost faith after your belief. If We pardon a group of you, We will punish others for their wickedness."

— Surah At-Tawbah 9:65-66

== Classical treatise ==
Al Jihaz wrote a 'Treatise on seriousness and playfulness.' Ibn Qutaybah said that early Muslims did not dislike joking.

== Recent trends ==
=== Acceptance ===
Since 9/11, there has been an increase in the number of Muslim diaspora comedians and humour festivals in the Western world, prominently the United States. Prominent Muslim comedians include Nabil Abdulrashid, Azhar Usman, Ahmed Ahmed, and Dean Obeidallah. Azhar Usman said the media misrepresent humour in Islam. "The fact is that within Muslim culture there is a strong tradition of storytelling, joking, and laughing. The relationship between Islam and comedy goes to the roots of the religion". American comedian Mo Amer said that it is Muslims who have done a "terrible job" of communicating with the outside world.

In 2017, in response to the "Real Housewives of ISIS", a parody of "Real Housewives" broadcast by BBC2 show Revolting, provoked widespread outrage and hilarity on Facebook.

=== Denial ===
Shia cleric Ruhollah Khomeini considered joking to be haram in Islam. In one of his sermons, he stated:

Allah did not create man so that he could have fun. The aim of creation was for mankind to be put to the test through hardship and prayer. An Islamic regime must be serious in every field. There are no jokes in Islam. There is no humour in Islam. There is no fun in Islam. There can be no fun and joy in whatever is serious. Islam does not allow swimming in the sea and is opposed to radio and television serials. Islam, however, allows marksmanship, horseback riding and competition...

== See also ==
- Allah Made Me Funny
- Axis of Evil Comedy Tour
- Fear of a Brown Planet
- List of Muslim comedians
- Looking for Comedy in the Muslim World
- Ramadan Roundup
- The Muslims Are Coming!
- The Bible and humor
- Muslim meme
