= Dean Obeidallah =

American journalist and comedian

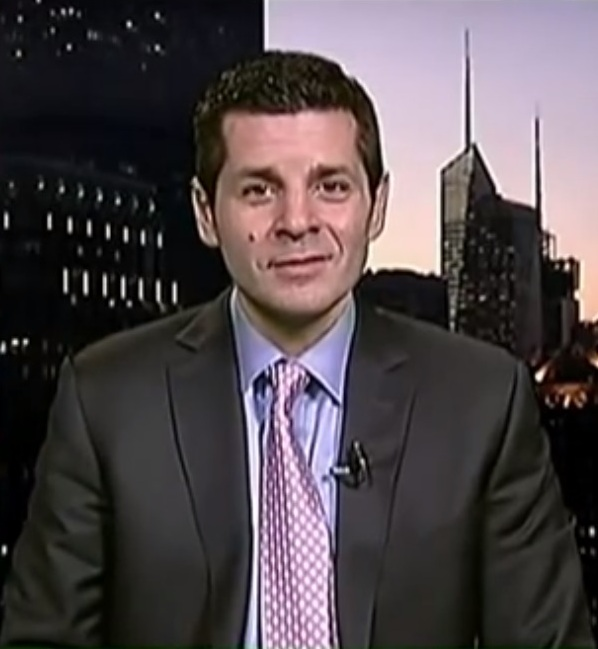
- Obeidallah on RT America in 2012
- Born: Lodi, New Jersey, U.S.
- Education: Fordham University (BA, JD)
- Political party: Democratic

Comedy career
- Years active: 1987–present
- Medium: Stand-up, Television, Theatre
- Genres: Political satire Observational comedy
- Subjects: American politics, American culture, current events, Middle East, Islamophobia, Islamic humour
- Website: Official website

Dean Obeidallah is an American lawyer, comedian, and journalist. He is the host of SiriusXM Progress' The Dean Obeidallah Show and a frequent contributor to CNN, The Daily Beast, and MS NOW.

Obeidallah was born in New Jersey and is of Palestinian and Italian descent.

== Early life and education ==
Obeidallah was born in Lodi, New Jersey, and grew up in nearby Paramus. His father was a Palestinian immigrant who came to the United States in the 1950s.

Obeidallah received a J.D. from Fordham Law School and practiced law from 1993 to 1998 with the firm of Beattie Padovano. His first performance as a comedian was at the New Jersey State Bar Association's stand-up comedy show. He then left the practice of law and was accepted into the NBC Page program in 1998. Obeidallah was a rights and clearance researcher for Saturday Night Live while also performing stand-up comedy in New York City.

== Career ==
In 2005, Obeidallah received the first "Spirit of Bill Hicks" award, named in honor of comedian Bill Hicks for "thought provoking comedy" from the NY Underground Comedy Festival and the Hicks family. He co-produced with the Emmy Award winning comedy writer and best-selling author Max Brooks a new show entitled The Watch List for Comedy Central's Internet channel. This was the first show ever produced by a major American entertainment company to showcase all Arab-American performers. Obeidallah has appeared on Comedy Central on the critically acclaimed "Axis of Evil" Comedy special.

He is the co-founder, along with Maysoon Zayid, of the New York Arab-American Comedy Festival. It is held annually in New York City and showcases Arab-American comedians from across the United States. The 20th annual Festival will be held in 2023. He cocreated The Muslim Funny Fest in 2015, the United States' only Muslim stand-up comedy Festival. The second year of the festival was held in July 2016.

Obeidallah served as the Executive Producer of the Amman Stand-up Comedy Festival held in Amman, Jordan from December 2–6, 2008. The third annual Festival was held from December 4 to 10, 2010.

He co-directed/co-produced the award-winning documentary with comedian/filmmaker Negin Farsad entitled The Muslims Are Coming! focusing on freedom of religion for all Americans. The film focuses on a free stand-up comedy tour by American-Muslim comedians across the South and West. It also features celebrity interviews with a wide range of people including The Daily Show's Jon Stewart, MSNBC's Rachel Maddow, CNN's Soledad O'Brien and Ali Velshi, Congressman Keith Ellison, comedians Lewis Black, David Cross, Colin Quinn, Lizz Winstead, and others. The film was released in September 2013.

In addition to appearing at hundreds of comedy clubs and colleges across the United States, Obeidallah has performed stand-up comedy in Canada and in the Middle East in Amman, Dubai, Beirut, Cairo, Haifa, Oman, Sharm El Sheikh and Ramallah.

In June 2019, a federal judge ordered Andrew Anglin, editor of the neo-Nazi website The Daily Stormer to pay $4.1 million to Obeidallah, whom Anglin had accused of orchestrating the Manchester Arena bombing.

== Controversy ==
Obeidallah appeared on the December 28, 2013 episode of MSNBC's Melissa Harris-Perry show. On a "photos of the year" segment of that program, Obeidallah and a panel of comedians made several jokes about a family picture featuring former Republican presidential candidate Mitt Romney's family, including his adopted black grandson, joking that the photo represented the diversity of the Republican Party. This sparked outrage, and Obeidallah later apologized to the Romneys for the remarks.
