= Teresa Ruiz (actress) =

Mexican-American actress

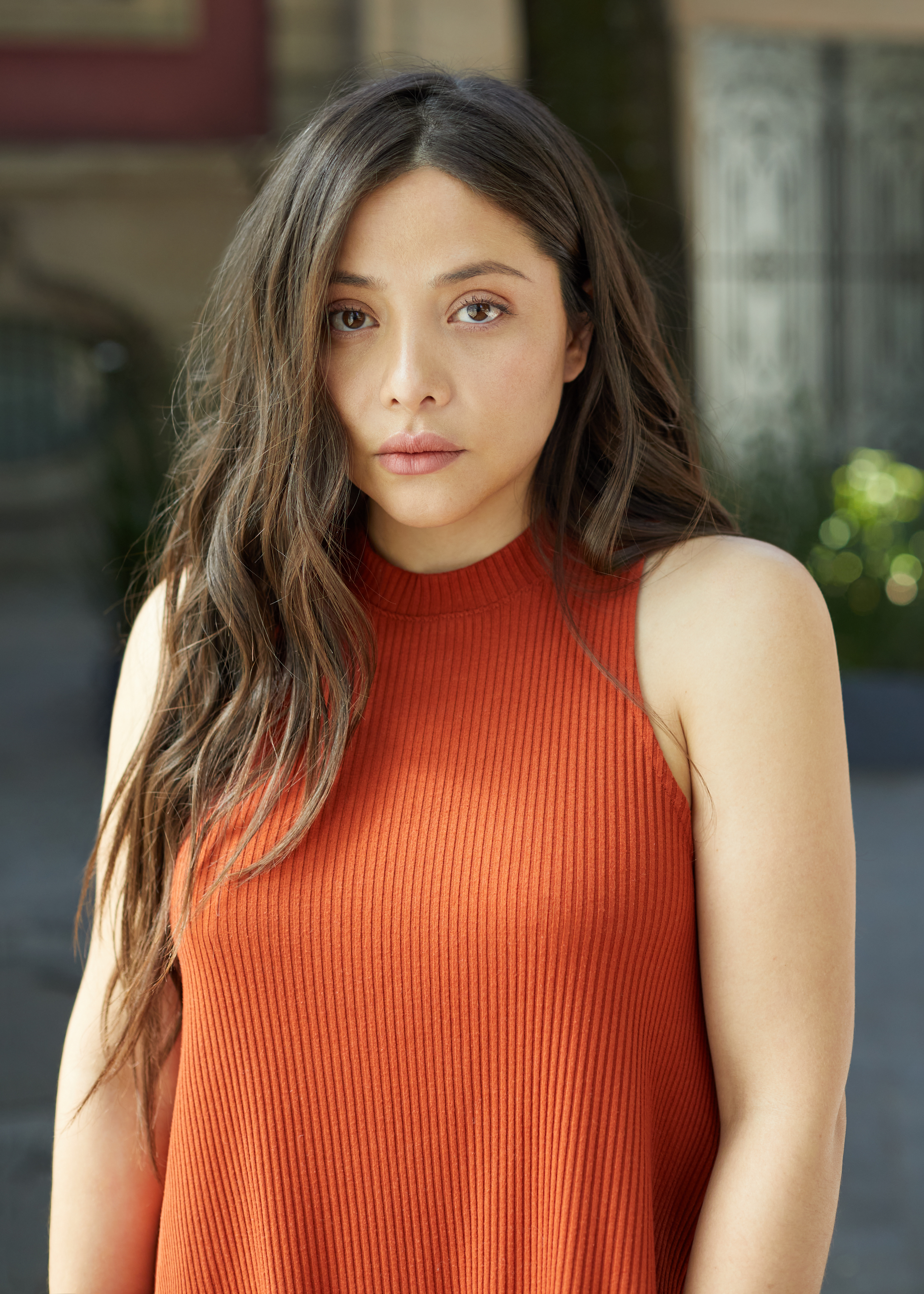
- Ruiz at a press conference for the film Father Stu
- Born: Santiago Matatlán, Oaxaca, Mexico
- Occupation: Actress
- Years active: 2006–present

Teresa Ruiz López is a Mexican-American actress.

Ruiz is best known for portraying cartel queen Isabella Bautista in the first two seasons of Narcos: Mexico as well as Maria in the American comedy-drama television series Mo that premiered on Netflix. In 2022 Ruiz starred in the biographical drama film Father Stu opposite Mark Wahlberg and Mel Gibson. Ruiz has been awarded several Best Actress awards internationally and is a Lifetime Member of the Actors Studio.

== Early life ==
Born in Oaxaca, Mexico, Ruiz moved to Ciudad Juárez with her parents at age 12 and Los Angeles at age 13, where she eventually enrolled in theater school. Beginning her career in Mexico, she eventually returned to the United States, becoming mentored by Martin Landau at the Actors Studio.

== Career ==
Ruiz appears in the 1st and 2nd seasons of the Netflix original series Narcos: Mexico playing Isabella Bautista, a long time friend (and partner in crime) of Miguel Ángel Félix Gallardo.

In 2022 Ruiz starred in the film Noise (Spanish: Ruido) a Mexican-Argentine drama film directed by Natalia Beristáin and written by Beristáin, Diego Enrique Osorno & Alo Valenzuela Escobedo. The film won the Spanish Cooperation Award at the San Sebastián International Film Festival.

She also played the character Nadia Basurto in the political thriller Aquí en la Tierra a co-production between Gael Garcia Bernal and Diego Luna's production company La Corriente del Golfo and Fox Networks. The 8-episode drama series written and directed by some of Mexico's most renowned filmmakers was the only Latin American title competing in the inaugural edition of Cannes Film Festival: Series.

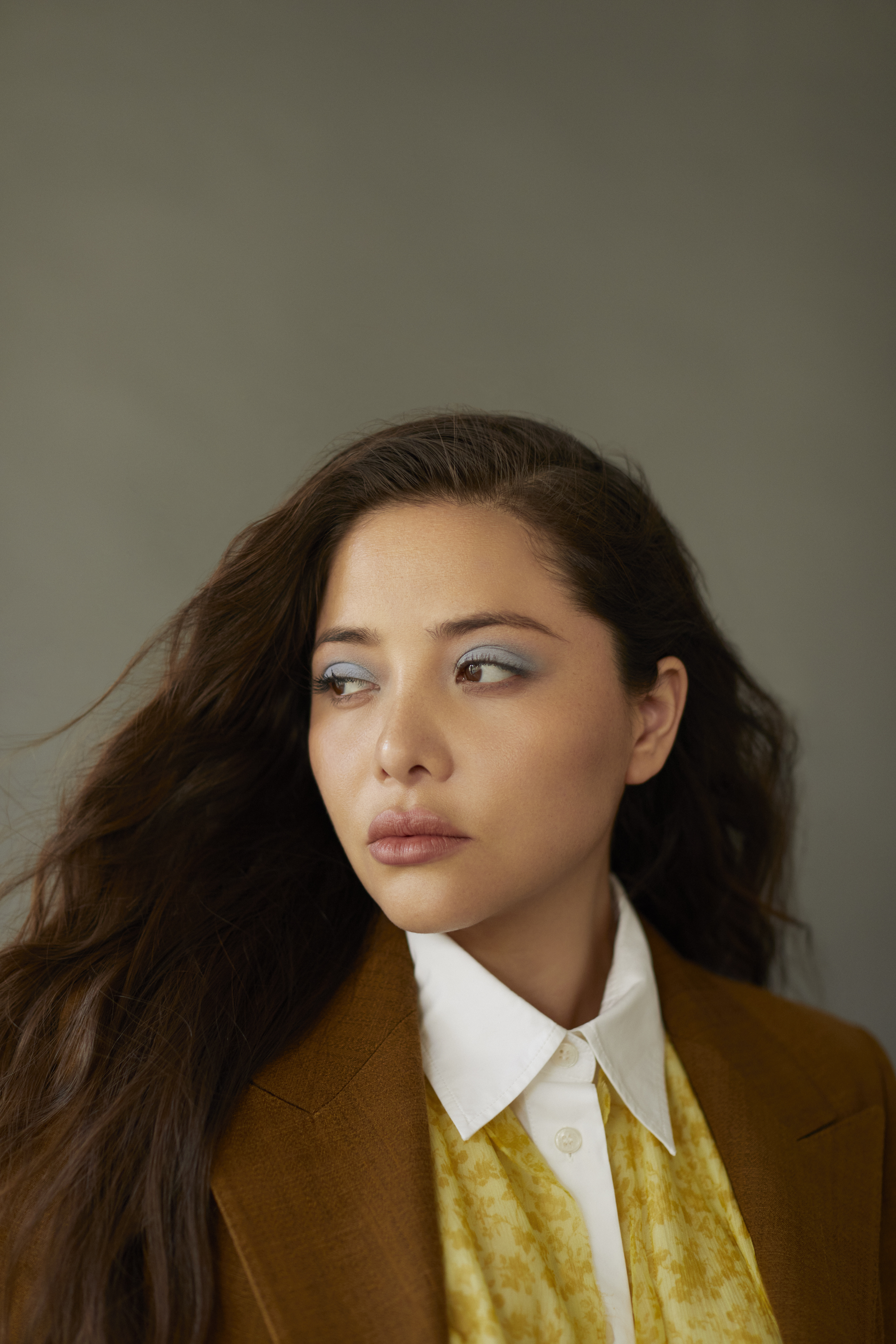
Teresa Ruiz in 2020

Ruiz appeared in Gregory Nava's controversial film Bordertown alongside Jennifer Lopez and Antonio Banderas. The story was based on the murders of women in Ciudad Juárez, Chihuahua and had the endorsement of Amnesty International.

Ruiz co-starred in the film The Delivery next to Mickey Rourke, an action movie parody directed by Louis Leterrier and appeared in Michael Bay's The Last Ship.

Ruiz went on to play the main character in Gerardo Tort's Round Trip (or Viaje Redondo in Spanish), for which she won several Best Actress awards including the Guadalajara's International Film Festival's Mayahuel, the Prix d'Interprétation Féminine at the Amiens International Film Festival in France and the India Catalina in Colombia; as well as Mexico's Academy Award: Ariel.

Other film works include Carlos Bolado's Tlatelolco; the film tells the story of the 1968 massacre of protesting students in Mexico's capital and Jose Luis Gutierrez-Arias' remake of the classic Spanish film Marcelino Pan y Vino. She played the Mexican Golden-Era actress and dancer Meche Barba, also known as The Mexican Venus, in the biopic Cantinflas about iconic Mexican actor Mario Moreno Cantinflas.

Ruiz was Executive Partner of the production company Machete, which won the Caméra d'Or at the 63 Cannes film festival for the film Año Bisiesto, directed by Michael Rowe.

=== Theater work ===
In 2014 Ruiz played the part of Veronica in The Actors Studio production of Stephen Adly Guirgis's The Motherfucker with the Hat. The play was produced by Martin Landau, Ellen Burstyn and Al Pacino and opened in Los Angeles in September 2014.

She also played young Frida Kahlo in Ofelia Medina's Cada Quien su Frida; the play had its worldwide premiere at the International Cadiz Theater Festival in Spain, then went on to tour in Cuba, Denmark, the UK, Mexico and the US.

== Filmography ==
=== Film ===
Year	Title	Role	Notes
2006	Bienvenido Paisano	Piffany	Directed by Rafael Villaseñor Kuri
2008	Bordertown	Cecilia Rojas	Directed by Gregory Nava
2010	Año Bisiesto	Producer	Machete Producciones
2010	Marcelino Pan y Vino	Cruz	Directed by Jose Luis Gutierrez
2010	Viaje Redondo	Lucia	Produced by Mantarraya - Jaime Romandia Directed by Gerardo Tort
2011	Cherry Palace	Unknown	This film remains unfinished
2011	Nos Vémos, Papa	Producer	Machete Producciones
2012	Tlatelolco	Licha	Produced by Fernando Sariñana Directed by Carlos Bolado
2012	Colosio: El Asesinato	Alejandra Iglecias	Produced by Monica Lozano Directed by Carlos Bolado
2012	Ciudadano Buelna	Actress	Directed by Felipe Cazals
2012	Mariachi Gringo	Ashlee	Directed by Tom Gustafson
2013	Cantinflas	Meche Barba	Directed by Sebastian del Amo
2015	Gringo Honeymoon	Rosalita	Directed by Alexandra Debricon
2015	The Delivery	La Reyna	Directed by Louis Leterrier
2021	The Marksman	Rosa	Directed by Robert Lorenz
2022	Father Stu	Carmen	Produced by Mark Wahlberg Directed by Rosalind Ross
2022	Noise	Abril Escobedo	Directed by Natalia Beristain
2024	The Dog Thief	Andrea	Directed by Vinko Tomičić Salinas

=== Television ===
Year	Title	Role	Notes
2011	El Encanto del Aguila	Xacinta	Televisa
2013	Major Crimes	Monica Garcia	Warner Brothers
2014	Gang Related	Marissa	20th Century Fox Television
2015	The Last Ship	Teresa	TNT
2018	Aquí en la Tierra	Nadia Basurto	Fox Networks
2018-2020	Narcos: Mexico	Isabella Bautista	Netflix
2019	The House of Flowers	Marilu	Netflix
2021	Luis Miguel	Azucena	Netflix Recurring (season 2), 5 episodes Main (season 3), 4 episodes
2022	Mo	Maria	Netflix Recurring

== Awards ==
Won 7 awards & 9 nominations:

Guadalajara International Film Festival

Year	Category	Film
2009	Mayahuel de Plata	Viaje Redondo

Amiens International Film Festival, France

Year	Category	Film
2009	Prix d’interprétation féminine	Viaje Redondo

Colombia International Film Festival

Year	Category	Film
2010	India Catalina	Viaje Redondo

Mexican Academy Awards

Year	Category	Film
2010	Ariel	Viaje Redondo

Canacine Awards

Year	Category	Film
2012	Best Actress	Viaje Redondo

Peabody Awards

Year	Category	Film
2023	Entertainment	Mo
