= Iman Zawahry =

American filmmaker and lecturer

- Born: Panama City, Florida, U.S.
- Education: University of Florida (BS); Florida State University (MFA)
- Occupations: Filmmaker; Academic
- Notable work: Americanish

Iman Zawahry is an American filmmaker and academic. She is a senior lecturer for the film production program at the University of Florida and is the director of the feature film Americanish (2021). Zawahry's work primarily focuses on narratives about Muslim-American experiences.

== Early life and education ==
Zawahry was raised in Panama City, Florida. She graduated from Rutherford High School in 1998. She received a Bachelor of Science in Journalism from the University of Florida. She later earned a Master of Fine Arts in Film Production from Florida State University.

== Career ==
Zawahry is an associate professor and the director of the film production program at the University of Florida College of the Journalism and Communications.

Zawahry has directed multiple short films, including Tough Crowd and UnderCover. Her work led to a collaboration with the Islamic Scholarship Fund to create the first American Muslim Film Grant.

Her debut feature film, Americanish, is one of the first American Muslim romantic comedy films directed by an American Muslim woman. The film follows the lives of three Muslim women in Jackson Heights, Queens. It screened at numerous film festivals and won the Audience Award at the CAAMFest in 2021.

In 2022, Zawahry directed episodes of the Canadian comedy series Zarqa, which was created by and stars Zarqa Nawaz. The series was broadcast on CBC Gem.

== Filmography ==
=== Feature films ===
Year	Title	Director	Writer	Producer	Distributor
2015	Paperback	No	No	Yes	
2021	Americanish	Yes	Yes	Yes	Sony Pictures International Productions

=== Short films ===
Year	Title	Director	Writer	Producer
2008	Tough Crowd	Yes	Yes	Yes
2009	The Cape	Yes	Yes	Yes
2010	UnderCover	Yes	Yes	Yes
2022	Portrait of a Young Man	No	No	Yes
2023	I Am from Palestine	Yes	Yes	Yes

== Accolades ==
Awards and nominations for Americanish
Year	Award	Category	Result	Ref.
2021	Bentonville Film Festival	Audience Award	Won	
2021	CAAMFest	Audience Award	Won	
2021	Heartland International Film Festival	Narrative Feature Grand Prize	Won	
2021	New York Asian Film Festival	Audience Award	Won	
2021	Philadelphia Asian American Film Festival	Audience Choice, Narrative Feature	Won	

Iman Zawahry at IMDb
