= Ramy Youssef =

American comedian and actor (born 1991)

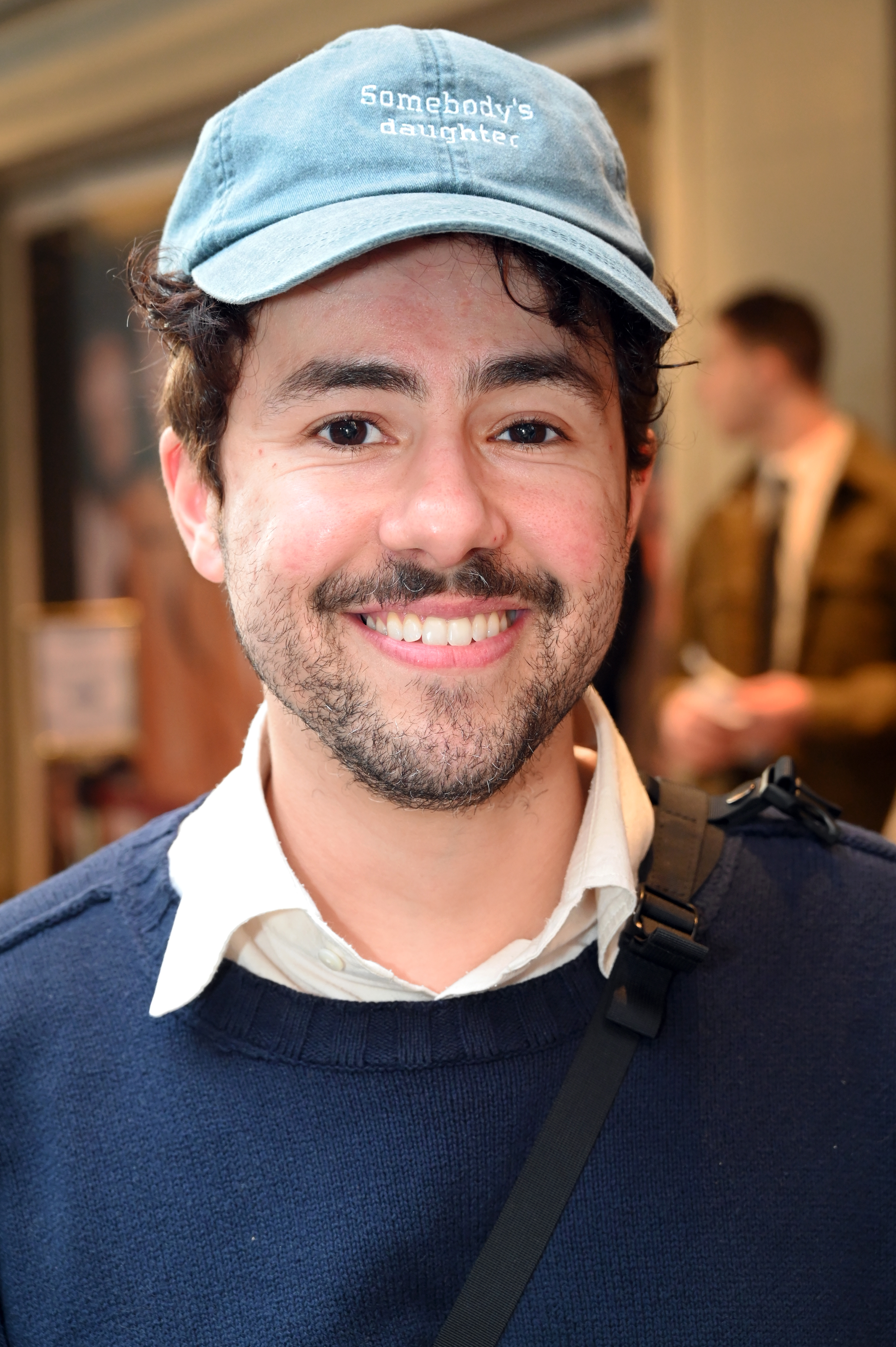
- Youssef in 2026
- Born: March 26, 1991 (age 35); New York City, New York, U.S.
- Education: Rutgers University, Newark (attended)
- Occupations: Comedian; actor; writer
- Years active: 2009–present

Ramy Youssef (Arabic: رامي يوسف, Egyptian Arabic: [ˈɾɑːmi ˈjuːsɪf]; born March 26, 1991) is an American stand-up comedian, actor and writer. He is known for his role as Ramy Hassan on the Hulu comedy series Ramy (2019–2022), for which he won a Golden Globe Award for Best Actor – Television Series Musical or Comedy and a Peabody Award in 2020. He was also nominated for two Primetime Emmy Awards for Outstanding Directing for a Comedy Series and Outstanding Lead Actor in a Comedy Series.

== Early life and education ==
Ramy Youssef was born in 1991 in Queens, a borough of New York City, to Egyptian immigrant parents, and raised in Rutherford, New Jersey. Ten years after emigrating from Egypt, his father became a manager at the Plaza Hotel in New York City. Youssef was raised in a Muslim household, observing Islamic holidays, and remains a practicing Muslim.

Youssef attended Rutherford High School. In high school, he and his friend Steve Way appeared on their high school television program. He went on to study political science and economics at Rutgers University, Newark, but he left before graduating to enroll at William Esper Studio to focus on acting.

Youssef speaks Arabic and English. His maternal grandfather was a French and Arabic interpreter at the United Nations.

Youssef was the 2023 Distinguished Graduate recipient awarded by Rutherford High School, the local high school he attended.

== Career ==
Youssef made his acting debut in 2012 on the Nick at Nite sitcom See Dad Run, in which he had a main role. During the run of the show, he shadowed the writers' room, an experience he would bring to his own show in 2019.

In 2017, Youssef appeared on The Late Show with Stephen Colbert, where he performed his stand-up routine.

His television series Ramy debuted on Hulu on April 19, 2019, with 10 episodes. The show, in which Youssef plays the title character, tells the story of a millennial first-generation Muslim-American born to immigrant parents in the United States. Soon after its first season debuted, Hulu renewed it for a second season. He received a Golden Globe in January 2020 for this role, and was also nominated for two Primetime Emmy Awards, as both an actor and director.

In June 2019, Youssef starred in his first HBO stand-up comedy special, Ramy Youssef: Feelings.

Along with Mo Amer, Youssef is the co-creator of Mo, an American comedy-drama streaming television series that premiered on August 24, 2022, on Netflix.

After the debut of Ramy, Youssef signed an overall television production deal with A24. As of December 2019, he had two shows in development, one for Apple TV+ and one for Netflix.

In 2021, he was nominated for another Golden Globe Award for Best Actor - Television Series Musical or Comedy for Ramy. Ramy season three premiered in the United States on 30 September 2022.

In a February 2024 interview, Youssef told Vanity Fair that his art has often taken him to Palestine, including to perform stand-up comedy in 2014 and in the aforementioned third season of Ramy.

In 2023, Youssef toured his comedy show "More Feelings" and announced that proceeds from the final 12 nights would raise funds for Gaza through American Near East Refugee Aid (ANERA). On December 8, 2023, Youssef's "More Feelings" show at the Brooklyn Academy of Music (BAM), which donated all proceeds from ticket sales to ANERA, drew headlines when celebrities including Taylor Swift and Selena Gomez attended.

Youssef had his first major movie role in the 2023 film Poor Things, directed by Yorgos Lanthimos.

On March 30, 2024, Youssef hosted Saturday Night Live.

In August 2024, it was announced that Youssef was entering into a partnership with Netflix to develop serialized first-look projects through his production company Cairo Cowboy.

In 2025, Youssef co-created, alongside Pam Brady, #1 Happy Family USA for Amazon Prime Video. The same year, he received an Honorary Doctor of Fine Arts degree from Rutgers University and gave the commencement speech.

== Personal life ==
Youssef has been married to a visual artist from Saudi Arabia since 2022. He met his wife through May Calamawy, his co-star in Ramy. He is private about his personal life, and has chosen not to disclose his wife's personal details publicly.

He signed an open letter to President Biden on October 20, 2023, by 55 prominent artists and advocates in the entertainment industry calling for a ceasefire and release of hostages in Gaza during the Israeli invasion. Youssef also wore an "Artists for Ceasefire" pin at the 2024 Academy Awards. Youssef prayed for God to "Please free the people of Palestine. And please free the hostages" during his Saturday Night Live monologue on March 30, 2024.

== Filmography ==
Key
†	Denotes films that have not yet been released

=== Film ===
Year	Title	Role	Notes
2016	Why Him?	Coder in kitchen	
2018	Don't Worry, He Won't Get Far on Foot	Drinker	
2023	Poor Things	Max McCandles	
2023	Wish	Safi	Voice

=== Television ===
Year	Title	Role	Notes
2012–2014	See Dad Run	Kevin Kostner	45 episodes
2015	One Crazy Cruise	Barnacle the Clown	Television film
2015	Nicky, Ricky, Dicky & Dawn	Ty	Episode: "Unhappy Campers"
2016	Gortimer Gibbon's Life on Normal Street	Lennon	Episode: "Gortimer vs. the World's Best Mom"
2017	Mr. Robot	Samar Swailem	3 episodes
2019–2022	Ramy	Ramy Hassan	30 episodes; also creator, writer, director, and executive producer
2019	Ramy Youssef: Feelings	Himself	Stand-up special
2022–2025	Mo	—N/a	16 episodes; co-creator, writer, and executive producer
2023	The Bear	—N/a	Director; episode "Honeydew"
2024	Ramy Youssef: More Feelings	Himself	Stand-up special
2024	Saturday Night Live	Himself (host)	Episode: "Ramy Youssef/Travis Scott"
2025–present	#1 Happy Family USA	Rumi Hussein / Hussein Hussein	Voice; also executive producer, writer, and creator
2025	The Studio	Himself	Episode: "The Golden Globes"
2025	Mountainhead	Jeffrey "Jeff" Abredazi	Television film
2025–2026	Saturday Night Live	Zohran Mamdani	2 episodes
2026	Ramy Youssef: In Love	Himself	Stand-up special

== Awards and nominations ==
Name of the award ceremony, year presented, category, nominee of the award, and the result of the nomination
Award	Year	Category	Nominated work	Result	Ref.
Critics' Choice Television Awards	2019	Best Actor in a Comedy Series	Ramy	Nominated	
Critics' Choice Television Awards	2021	Best Actor in a Comedy Series	Ramy	Nominated	
Golden Globe Awards	2020	Best Actor in a Television Series – Musical or Comedy	Ramy	Won	
Golden Globe Awards	2021	Best Actor in a Television Series – Musical or Comedy	Ramy	Nominated	
Gotham Awards	2019	Breakthrough Series – Short Form	Ramy	Nominated	
NAACP Image Awards	2021	Outstanding Breakthrough Creative – Television	Ramy	Nominated	
Primetime Emmy Awards	2020	Outstanding Lead Actor in a Comedy Series	Ramy (episode: "You Are Naked in Front of Your Shaikh")	Nominated	
Primetime Emmy Awards	2020	Outstanding Directing for a Comedy Series	Ramy (episode: "Miakhalifa.mov")	Nominated	
Primetime Emmy Awards	2024	Outstanding Directing for a Comedy Series	The Bear (Episode: "Honeydew")	Nominated	
Satellite Awards	2021	Best Actor in a Musical or Comedy Series	Ramy	Nominated	
Screen Actors Guild Awards	2021	Outstanding Performance by a Male Actor in a Comedy Series	Ramy	Nominated	
TCA Awards	2020	Individual Achievement in Comedy	Ramy	Nominated	
Writers Guild of America Awards	2020	Comedy/Variety – Specials	Ramy Youssef: Feelings	Nominated	
Peabody Awards	2023	Entertainment	Mo	Won	
Directors Guild of America Awards	2024	Outstanding Directing – Comedy Series	The Bear (Episode: "Honeydew")	Nominated	
