= Omar Elba =

Egyptian-American actor

- Born: September 19, 1983 (age 42)
- Known for: A Hologram for the King

Omar Elba (born September 19, 1983) is an Egyptian-American actor, best known for co-starring alongside Tom Hanks in the movie A Hologram for the King. He also had a recurring role as Mark Green opposite Jessica Biel in the Limetown television series.

== Career ==
In the A24/Netflix series Mo, Elba plays Sameer, an autistic character who has trouble fitting in. In preparation for the role, he worked meticulously with a behavioral therapist studying specific autistic patients at great length. His nuanced portrayal of autism received rave reviews, most notably from family and caregivers of members of the autism community.

Elba also starred, wrote and directed Tim, a Freudian short film about the Ego, Id and Superego. In preparation for the 2 main roles, he transformed his body twice by gaining 20 pounds of fat to play Tim and then losing the weight and gaining 10 pounds of muscle to play Tim's Ego. For the physical transformation between both characters to take place, the two performances, Tim and Tim's Ego, were shot one year apart, respectively. In the film, both characters, Tim (an overweight, balding codependent) and Tim's Ego (his better looking, more assertive counterpart), are seen interacting onscreen simultaneously.

== Filmography ==
=== Film ===
Year	Title	Role	Notes
2016	A Hologram for the King	Yousef	
2016	Tim	Tim/Id, Ego & Super Ego	Short film, also directed
2019	Berlin, I Love You	Selim	

=== Television ===
Year	Title	Role	Notes
2013	NCIS: Los Angeles	Zaki Faheem	Episode: "Purity"
2013	Ironside	Omar Najibullah	Episode: "Uptown Murders"
2014	Intelligence	SMI Officer	Episode: "Secrets of the Secret Service"
2019	Limetown	Mark Green	7 episodes
2022–25	Mo	Sameer Najjar	Main role
