= Allah Made Me Funny =

American stand-up comedy troupe

- Born: Bryant Moss (2004–present); Azhar Usman (2004–present); Azeem Muhammad (2004–2006); Mohammed Amer (2006–present)
- Notable work: Allah Made Me Funny: The Official Muslim Comedy Tour (2005); Allah Made Me Funny: Live in Concert (2008); Allah Made Me Funny – Official Muslim Comedy Show – Live HMV Apollo (2009)

Comedy career
- Years active: 2004–present
- Medium: stand-up, television, film
- Genres: observational comedy, satire
- Subjects: Islamic humor, Islamophobia, war on terror, political humor, ethnic stereotype
- Website: www.allahmademefunny.com

Allah Made Me Funny are an American stand-up comedy troupe consisting of Bryant "Preacher" Moss, Azhar Usman, and Azeem Muhammad, who was later replaced by Mohammed "Mo" Amer. They are the longest-running artistic collective of Muslim comic performers in the world.

== History ==
=== Formation and early underground work (2003–2007) ===
In December 2003, Preacher Moss founded the act and made the debut at a club in Washington. In 2004, Azhar Usman joined. In May 2004, Moss, Usman and Azeem Muhammad launched a comedy tour titled 'Allah Made Me Funny'.

In 2005, Usman explained the rationale behind the troupe's name saying "Well, the word 'Allah'... is actually beautiful. And it is nothing more, nothing less than the Arabic word for God. So Allah Made Me Funny is the Muslim answer to God Made Me Funky." Their show was modeled on Spike Lee's The Original Kings of Comedy.

Allah Made Me Funny started out in purely Islamic gatherings, such as the annual Islamic Society of North America conference. During its first year, they toured 30 US cities, and also in Canada, Europe, Malaysia, Australia, New Zealand, and the Middle East. They performed more than 50 shows across the US and Canada in their first year. They have also performed at the Global Peace and Unity Event in the ExCeL Exhibition Centre in London organised by Islam Channel.

In June 2005, Allah Made Me Funny: The Official Muslim Comedy Tour DVD was released, which features Muhammad, Usman and Moss performing live stand-up at The Improv in Brea, California.

In November 2006, they toured Australia. In April 2007, they performed in UK cities including London, Birmingham, Manchester, Bradford, Cardiff and Glasgow. In November that year, they performed in UK cities including London, Cardiff, Glasgow, Birmingham, Manchester and Bradford.

=== Mainstream success and critical acclaim (2008–present) ===
In October 2008, Allah Made Me Funny: Live in Concert film was released at 15 screens in U.S. cinemas. The documentary/concert film, which was created from the longest-running comedy tour in America, follows Amer, Moss and Usman as they perform at comedy clubs around the country, and mostly features a performance before an audience at the Heritage Forum in Anaheim, California in August 2007. The film pauses between acts to chronicle how they make comedy from their personal experiences as Muslims in post 9/11 America, behind-the-scenes footage into the comedians' day-to-day family lives, the work that goes into their show and how they prepare new material.

In April 2009, Allah Made Me Funny toured the UK, where they performed in cities, including London and Manchester. In October 2010, they took part in a one-off concert with Aamer Rahman and Nazeem Hussain (Fear of a Brown Planet) at the Athenaeum Theatre in Paris.

In September, October and November 2011, they toured the U.S. and UK with their "Word Domination Comedy Tour", where they performed in cities including Washington DC, Manchester, London, Birmingham and Glasgow.

Allah Made Me Funny have been featured in over 100 major world media, including CBS Sunday Morning, CNN Headline News, and a whole episode of ABC Nightline. In June 2013, Amer and Usman featured on an interfaith special What’s So Funny About Religion? which was broadcast on the CBS Television Network.

Allah Made Me Funny have toured in over 30 countries in four different continents. They have been featured reviews and interviews from The New York Times, The Washington Post, Time and US television, plus international coverage on the BBC and in The Guardian.

== Comedy style and reception ==
Allah Made Me Funny shows have offered non-Muslims a chance to get to know about Islamic culture and have provided a place where Muslims can gather to share humor about their own lives and experiences. Their goal it is to break down racial and cultural stereotypes and foster understanding across cultures, while educating both Muslims and non-Muslims about tolerance and acceptance through comedy and break down barriers no matter what peoples' beliefs or backgrounds are.

Whilst on the tour the comedians ensure that their jokes are respectful and do not include sexual references, profanity or backbiting. To ensure that Muslims will be comfortable attending their show, the comedians request that comedy clubs do not serve alcohol or pork, or allow smoking during performances.

Their routines mostly includes stereotypes, misunderstanding and fear mongering over the Muslim faith in the world today. They talk about being Muslim in America, portraying the challenges and pitfalls, while simultaneously poking fun at Muslims in a light-hearted manner.

The comedians' most popular jokes are about common Muslim stereotypes, with each comedian adding their own ethnic twist. Their routine includes jokes about themselves, their communities, 9/11, customs, religious holidays, family, marriage, popular culture, the government, and the complications of being Muslim in post 9/11 America.

=== Reviews ===
- "This is where mainstream America meets Islam, not with conflict but with laughter." – BBC News
- "Allah Made Me Funny is funny...refreshing, respectful, and irreverent look at religion." – The Independent
- "...achieves it declared purpose." – The Guardian
- "The title doesn't lie." – The New York Times
- "The response from the audience is overwhelming." – BBC News
- "Three Muslims walk into a theatre. Everyone laughs with them." – Sydney Morning Herald
- "Allah Made Me Funny has been a huge success by challenging stereotypes and giving people permission to relax and laugh." – The Age

== Awards ==
In October 2005, Allah Made Me Funny were honored at the annual media awards dinner of the Los Angeles-based Muslim Public Affairs Council.

== See also ==
- Islamic humour
- Islam in the United States
- Fear of a Brown Planet
