= Preacher Moss =

American comedian

- Born: Bryant Reginald Moss; 1967 (age 58–59); Washington, D.C., United States
- Other name: Preacher Moss
- Spouse: Yasmin Moss (m. 2003)

Comedy career
- Years active: 1994–present
- Medium: Stand-up, television, film
- Genres: Observational comedy, satire
- Subjects: Islamic humour, racism, Islamophobia, political humour, current events, American culture, human interaction
- Website: preachermoss.com

Bryant Reginald Moss (born 1967), best known by his stage name Preacher Moss, is an American stand-up comedian and writer. He is best known as one third of comedy trio Allah Made Me Funny.

== Early life ==
Moss was born in Washington, D.C. to African American parents, Clifford Moss and Mary Moss. He began practicing comedy at the age of seven, when he earned the nickname "Preacher" for his imitations of the pastor at his family's church. He was raised Christian in a Maryland suburb and was sent to a local military academy for his schooling. Moss started out doing sketch comedy when he was 17 and by his early 20s he began to make his way to comedy clubs.

In 1988, at the age of 20, he converted to Islam. He graduated from Marquette University with a degree in journalism and took a job teaching emotionally disturbed children in Milwaukee, while continuing to do standup comedy.

== Writing career ==
In 1994, Moss was the opening act for a comic Darrell Hammond, Hammond hired him as a writer. In order to develop his comedy skills, Moss moved to Los Angeles. There, he continued to teach special education classes and worked as a writer for comedians, including Damon Wayans and George Lopez.

== Stand-up career ==
Moss moved on to perform at mainstream comedy venues. Moss wrote his own show, titled End of Racism. Beginning in 2000, he toured hundreds of national college campuses and high schools performing, teaching, and discussing poverty, racism, multiculturalism, civil rights, and critical race theory. He performed "End of Racism" for four years when he got an idea for another kind of progressive comedy experience which addressed another kind of prejudice, that was spreading rapidly throughout non-Islamic communities in post-9/11 America.

In May 2004, Moss and other Muslim comedians Azhar Usman and Azeem Muhammad (later replaced by Mohammed Amer in 2006) launched a comedy tour titled Allah Made Me Funny, Allah Made Me Funny toured 30 U.S. cities during its first year, and also in Canada, Europe, Malaysia, Australia, New Zealand, and the Middle East.

Moss has performed at the Global Peace and Unity Event in the ExCeL Exhibition Centre in London organised by Islam Channel. He has also performed at the Oklahoma Chapter of the Council on American-Islamic Relations banquet in Oklahoma City in 2010. Preacher can be seen in the documentary, The Muslims Are Coming!, which features a group of Muslim American comedians touring the U.S. in an effort to counter Islamophobia.

== Television career ==
In March 2013, Moss started the process of securing funds to develop a pilot for a sitcom Here Come the Muhammads. In October 2013, production for the sitcom started.

== Comedy style ==
Moss talks about his conversion from Christianity to Islam. He uses his experiences of being black and Muslim in America as a vantage point for asides on race and religion.

== Personal life ==
In 2003, Moss married Yasmin, an Indian Muslim living in Toronto, Canada. When not on tour, he lives in Long Beach, California, and frequently visits his mother's home in Washington, D.C.

== Awards ==
Year	Award	Category	Result
2005	Muslim Public Affairs Council	Media Award	Won
2009	Campus Activities Magazine Reader's Choice Awards	Best Diversity Performer	Won

== See also ==
- African American
- Allah Made Me Funny
- Islamic humour
- Lists of African Americans
- List of African-American writers
- List of converts to Islam
