= Mo Amer =

Palestinian-American stand-up comedian

- محمد عامر
- Amer in 2026
- Born: Mohammed Mustafa Amer; July 24, 1981 (age 45); Kuwait
- Other names: Mo, Mohammed Najjar
- Children: 1

Comedy career
- Years active: 1999–present
- Medium: Stand-up; television; film
- Genres: Observational comedy; satire; self-deprecation; storytelling; improv; character comedy
- Subjects: Islamic humour; Islamophobia; Political satire; Family; Marriage; Racism; American immigration; Refugees
- Website: moamer.com

Mohammed Mustafa Amer (Arabic: محمد مصطفى عامر; born July 24, 1981) is a Palestinian-American stand-up comedian and actor. He is known for his Netflix comedy special Mo Amer: The Vagabond and as a member of the comedy trio Allah Made Me Funny. Amer also appeared in the Hulu sitcom Ramy (2019-2022) where he played the character Mo, Ramy's cousin who owns a diner. Additionally, he created and stars in the Netflix series Mo, released in August 2022, which is loosely based on his real life experience as a Palestinian refugee. The same year, he appeared in the film Black Adam. Amer also hosted the 2023 season of Doha Debates' flagship series, filmed in Qatar's Education City.

== Early life ==
Mohammed Mustafa Amer is Palestinian and the youngest of six children. His father worked as an engineer for the Kuwait Oil Company. Amer attended a British school in Kuwait, where he learned British English.

At age 9, Amer, with his siblings and mother, fled Kuwait during the Gulf War and emigrated to the United States, settling in Houston, Texas. He attended Piney Point Elementary School, where he was placed in an ESL class despite already being proficient in English.

In 1992, Amer's father, a telecom engineer, joined the family in the United States. One of his brothers became a pilot, and another earned a PhD in biochemistry. Amer's father died in 1995 when Amer was 14 years old, leading to a period of academic struggles. A teacher later encouraged him to pursue comedy as an outlet for his grief.

== Career ==
=== Beginning of career ===
When he was 10 years old, Amer attended a Bill Cosby performance at the Houston Astrodome, and four years later, he discovered stand-up comedy at a Texas rodeo. After his father's death, Amer struggled academically; an English teacher encouraged him to perform a monologue from Shakespeare in exchange for extra credit. This evolved into a regular comedy routine in front of his class, where he would tell jokes about the subject they were studying. The same English teacher encouraged him to participate in his high school's theater productions and eventually start performing stand-up comedy by impersonating family members. Amer refined his comedic skills at Houston's comedy clubs while working at a flag manufacturing company.

=== Standup ===
In June 1999, Amer participated in Houston's Funniest Person Contest and reached the finals. He was then directed to The Comedy Showcase, where the owner, Danny Martinez, mentored him in stand-up comedy. By age 19, Amer was performing for U.S. troops stationed abroad, becoming one of the first Arab-American refugee comedians to do so.

In 2004, he performed at The Comedy Festival in Las Vegas. Starting in 2006, along with Preacher Moss and Azhar Usman, Amer travelled the country for the Allah Made Me Funny tour. He has also made appearances at the Islamic Relief Evening of Inspiration at the Royal Albert Hall in 2007 and the Global Peace and Unity event in London in 2008.

Amer has since performed in over 27 countries across five continents. His comedy has been featured in sold-out shows worldwide, including venues such as Royal Albert Hall, Hammersmith Apollo, and Shrine Auditorium. He has also appeared on television and radio, including NPR, BBC, and CNN, and has been interviewed by major media outlets like The New York Times, Rolling Stone, and The Guardian. Amer was also featured on "Al-Bernameg with Bassem Youssef," the Egyptian equivalent of The Daily Show.

In 2015, Amer began touring with Dave Chappelle and eventually recorded his one-hour special, Legally Homeless, at the Warner Theatre, becoming one of the first Arab-Americans to have a nationally televised stand-up special. The special's title reflects Amer's experiences navigating multiple cultures without a passport. Legally Homeless includes appearances by comedians such as Azhar Usman, Bassem Youssef, Hasan Minhaj, and Ramy Youssef.

In March 2017, Amer made his U.S. network television debut on The Late Show with Stephen Colbert. Amer filmed his first Netflix comedy special, Mo Amer: The Vagabond, which was released in 2018. In 2022, his second Netflix special Mo Amer: Mohammed in Texas was released on Netflix. It has a Rotten Tomatoes audiences score of 96%.

In 2025, Amer participated in the Riyadh Comedy Festival, an event hosted in Riyadh, the capital city of Saudi Arabia. The festival was criticized by Human Rights Watch, which characterized the event as an attempt by the Saudi government to whitewash its human rights abuses.

=== Film and television ===
In 2018, Amer joined the cast of the Hulu show Ramy. In the series, Amer plays Ramy's cousin Mo, who owns a diner where many of the show's characters gather. Amer has co-written an original feature screenplay with filmmaker Iman Zawahry and Azhar Usman.

In 2022, Amer created, starred in, and directed some episodes of the Netflix series Mo, which is loosely based on his experiences as a Palestinian refugee. The show received widespread acclaim and won several awards, including a Peabody Award. It was renewed for a second season. That same year, Amer starred in the DC film Black Adam alongside Dwayne Johnson and was named 2022 UAE GQ Man of the Year.

Season 2 of Mo was released in January 2025, to "widespread acclaim" is one of "Netflix's most celebrated comedies", and was called "Essential Viewing" by Mashable. Both seasons of the show have a 100% critic score on Rotten Tomatoes.

== Comedy style ==
Amer draws from his ethnic and family background to discuss issues related to religion, terrorism, and contemporary politics, using personal stories about his family and himself. He often addresses his Palestinian heritage, family experiences, and growing up in America.

== Personal life ==
Amer lives in Los Angeles and is divorced. He has a son.

In 2009, Amer became a U.S. citizen, allowing him to travel to Jordan to visit family he had not seen for almost 20 years. He also returned to Kuwait and Baghdad for the first time since his family fled.

In October 2023, Amer signed an open letter for the "Artists4Ceasefire" campaign, along with other artists, urging President Joe Biden to advocate for a ceasefire during the Israeli invasion of the Gaza Strip.

== Filmography ==
=== Film ===
Year	Title	Role	Notes
2021	Americanish	Zane	
2022	Black Adam	Karim	
2024	Sweet Dreams	Pete	

=== Television ===
Year	Title	Role	Notes
2018	Crashing	Himself	Episode: "Porter Got HBO"
2018	Mo Amer: The Vagabond	Himself	Netflix Comedy Special
2019–2022	Ramy	Mo	Main role
2021	Mo Amer: Mohammed in Texas	Himself	Netflix Comedy Special
2022–2025	Mo	Mo Najjar	Also creator
2025	Mo Amer: Wild World	Himself	Netflix Comedy Special

== Awards and nominations ==
Year	Association	Category	Nominated work	Result	Ref.
2022	Gotham Awards	Breakthrough Series — Short Form	Mo	Won	
2023	Independent Spirit Awards	Best Lead Performance in a New Scripted Series	Mo	Nominated	
2023	Peabody Awards	Entertainment	Mo	Won	

== See also ==
- Palestinian diaspora
- List of American Muslims
