= List of Vogue Arabia cover models =

This list of Vogue Arabia cover models (2017–present) is a catalog of cover models who have appeared on the cover of Vogue Arabia, the Arabian edition of American fashion magazine Vogue.

== 2010s ==
=== 2017 ===
Issue	Cover model	Photographer
March	Gigi Hadid	Inez & Vinoodh
April	Imaan Hammam	Patrick Demarchelier
May	Pooja Mor	Ben Hassett
June	Halima Aden	Greg Kadel
July/August	Jourdan Dunn	Cüneyt Akeroğlu
September	Bella Hadid	Karl Lagerfeld
October	Afef Jnifen; Farida Khelfa; Hanaa Ben Abdesslem; Kenza Fourati	Tom Munro
November	Rihanna	Greg Kadel
December	Nora Attal	Emma Summerton

=== 2018 ===
Issue	Cover model	Photographer
January	Nancy Ajram	Michael Schwartz
February	Irina Shayk	Miguel Reveriego
March	Imaan Hammam & Iman	Patrick Demarchelier
April	Adwoa Aboah	Cass Bird
May	Amel Bouchoucha; Haya Abdulsalam; Saba Mubarak; Salma Abu Deif; Shereen Reda	Jack Waterlot
June	Princess Hayfa bint Abdullah Al Saud	Boo George
July/August	Paloma Elsesser & Ashley Graham	Miguel Reveriego
September	Nicki Minaj	Emma Summerton
October	Nadine Labaki	Drew Jarrett
November	Naomi Campbell	Chris Colls
December	Hailey Bieber	Zoey Grossman

=== 2019 ===
Issue	Cover model	Photographer
January	Nancy Ajram	Alvaro Beamud
February	Ciara	Mariano Vivanco
March	Gigi Hadid	Peter Lindbergh
April	Amina Adan; Halima Aden; Ikram Abdi Omar	Txema Yeste
May	Bella Maria Breidy & Rym Breidy; Elisa Sednaoui Dellal & Anna Morra Sednaoui	Alvaro Beamud Cortés
May	Huda Kattan & Nour Gisele	Domen & Van de Velde
June	Winnie Harlow & Shahad Salman	Dan Beleiu
July/August	Yasmine Sabri	Silja Magg
September	Kim Kardashian	Txema Yeste
October	Amina El Demirdash	Julia Torres
October	Ugbad Abdi	Peter Lindbergh
November	Adriana Lima & Samir Ghanem	Elizaveta Porodina
December	Hayett McCarthy; Leyla Greiss; Malika El Maslouhi; Nora Attal; Nour Rizk	Dan Beleiu

== 2020s ==
=== 2020 ===
Issue	Cover model	Photographer
January	Tilila Oulhaj	Elizaveta Porodina
February	Nadine Nassib Njeim	Mariano Vivanco
March	Asalah Nasri	Hassan Hajjaj
March	Sheikha Hoor Al Qasimi	Hassan Hajjaj
March	Yousra	Hassan Hajjaj
April	Eman Deng	Carla Guler, El Seed (Illustrator)
May	Constance Jablonski; Eva Herzigová; Imaan Hammam; Nora Attal	Constance Jablonski
June	Majida El Roumi	Sandra Chidiac
July/August	Kourtney Kardashian	Arved Colvin-Smith
September	Hend Sabri	Amr Ezzeldinn
October	Farida Khelfa	Jean-Paul Goude
November	Lily Collins	Thomas Whiteside
December	Cindy Bruna; Amira Al Zuhair; Sophie Alshehry	Tom Munro; Txema Yeste

=== 2021 ===
Issue	Cover model	Photographer
January	Mona Zaki	Domen & Van de Velde
February	Creativity edition	Mous Lamrabat
March	Abla Fahita	Amina Zaher
April	Mohamed Ramadan	Malak Kabbani
May	Malika El Maslouhi	Thibault-Théodore
June	Shahad Salman & Abdulrahman Alammar	Arwa Al Banawi
July/August	Precious Lee	Paola Kudacki
September	HH Sheikha Latifa bint Mohammed bin Rashid Al Maktoum	Paola Kudacki
October	Rawdah Mohamed & Nadia Khaya	Julien Vallon
November	Penélope Cruz	Luigi & Iango
December	Taylor Hill	Mazen Abusrour

=== 2022 ===
Issue	Cover model	Photographer
January	Adriana Lima & Abdel El Tayeb	Hassan Hajjaj
February	Rita Ora	Jeremy Choh
March	Amina Muaddi; Huda Kattan; Nadine Nassib Njeim	Tom Munro
April	Ugbad Abdi	Luigi & Iango
May	Samira Said	Philipp Jelenska
June	Shanina Shaik	Greg Swales
July/August	Nour Rizk & Sawai Padmanabh Singh	Nishanth Radhakrishnan
September	Sharon Stone	Nima Benati
October	Deepika Padukone	Julien Vallon
November	Nadia Nadim	Sam Rawadi
November	Naomi Campbell	Sam Rawadi
December	Imaan Hammam; Aicha Hammam	Bibi Borthwick

=== 2023 ===
Issue	Cover model	Photographer
January	Ons Jabeur	Sam Rawadi
February	Huda Kattan	Pierfrancesco Artini
March	Cindy Crawford	Thomas Whiteside
April	Yasmine Sabri	Nima Benati
May	Halima Aden	Youssef Oubahou
June	Candice Swanepoel, Coco Rocha, Isabeli Fontana, Donna Bahdon, Sara Sampaio, Toni Garrn, Sasha Luss, Amira Al Zuhair, Taleedah and Sophie Alshehry	Domen & Van de Velde
July/August	Rekha	Tarun Khiwal
September	Myriem Boukadida, Aouatif Saadi, Farnoush Hamidian	Desiree Mattsson
September	Esaad Younes	Desiree Mattsson
September	Hayam Abdulsalam	Desiree Mattsson
October	Lady Madonna	Nima Benati
November	Stand for Humanity	
December	Nour, Zeyne, Manal Benchlikha, Nouf Sufyani, Almas, Tamtam, Yara Mustafa, Laura Mekhail, Aisha	Esra Sam
December	Enhypen	Jang Dukhwa
December	Anitta	Ivan Erick Menezes

=== 2024 ===
Issue	Cover model	Photographer
January	Rania Benchegra	Txema Yeste
February	Raneem Haitham; Kira Yaghnam; Tara Abboud; Sarah Yousef; Thalia Alansari	Mazen Abusrour
February	Arwa Al Banawi; Abeer and Alia Oraif; Husein Alireza; Lina Malaika; Mohammed "Moe" Khoja; Nojoud Alrumaihi; Husein Alireza; Sarah Taibah; Fay Fouad; Aisha Almamy; Ziyad “Zizo” Almaayouf	Amer Mohamad
March	Halima Aden	Nima Benati
March	Nadine Nassib Njeim	Nima Benati
March	Monica Bellucci	Nima Benati
March	Kareena Kapoor Khan	Nima Benati
March	Winnie Harlow	Nima Benati
March	Elyanna	Greg Swales
March	Abrar Alothman	Amer Mohamed
April	Youssra	Amer Mohamed
April	Summer Shesha, Marwan Hamed, Menna Shalaby, Tara Emad, Ahmed Hatem	Amer Mohamed
April	Nour El Nabaw, Nour, Reem El Adl, Huda Elmufti, Razane Jammal	Amer Mohamed
May	Salma Hayek Pinault	Cuneyt Akeroglu
June	HRH Princess AlJoharah bint Talal bin Abdulaziz Al Saud	Oscar Munar
June	Yara Alnamlah	Nima Benati
July/August	Dunya Aboutaleb, Nawal El Moutawakel	Amer Mohamed
September	Claudia Schiffer	Kayt Jones
October	Salma Abu Deif	Alvaro Gracia
November	Imane Khelif	Tarek Mawad
December	Najwa Karam	Mazen Abusrour

=== 2025 ===
Issue	Cover model	Photographer
March	Imaan Hammam, Achraf Hakimi	Txema Yeste
April	Balqees	Luc Braquet
May	Amelia Gray	Zoey Grossmann
June	Almira Al Zuhair, Taleedah Tamer, Zahra Hussain	Greg Adamski
June	Georgina Rodríguez	Sharif Hamza
July/August	Hande Erçel, Amina Khalil	Kian Kanani
September	Kris Jenner	Norman Jean Roy
October	Nehmat Aoun	Sandra Chidiac
November	Plestia Alaqad	Tanya Traboulsi
November	Saja Kilani	Mazen Abusrour
December	Mona Zaki	Richard Phibbs

=== 2026 ===
Issue	Cover model	Photographer
January	Nancy Ajram	Mazen Abusrour
February	Sheika Bodour bint Sultan Al Qasimi and others	Lesha Lich
February	Shaikha Noor Rashid Al Khalifa, Shaikh Rashid bin Khalifa Al Khalifa	Lesha Lich
February	Princess Nourah Al Faisal Al Saud, Princess Abeer Al Faisal Al Saud	Lesha Lich
March	Lindsay Lohan	Jonas Bresnan
April	Christine Codsi, Marina El Khawand, Maya Chams Ibrahimchah, Lana El-Khalil, Mia Atoui	Sandra Chidiac
April	Manju Mandol, Sabrina Rabhi, Becky Anderson, Aida Al Busaidy, Cristina Calaguian	Lesha Lich
May	Priyanka Chopra	Emma Summerton
June	Lamar Faden, Rateel Alshehri, Lamar Mohammad	Jonas Bresnan
July/August	Elyanna	Adrienne Raquel
September	Cardi B	Szilveszter Makó
October	Irina Shayk	Norman Jean Roy
November	Haifa Wehbe	Kristian Schuller
