= List of Muslims in entertainment and the media in non-Muslim countries =

This is a list of notable Muslims in entertainment and the media outside Muslim-majority countries

== Comedy ==
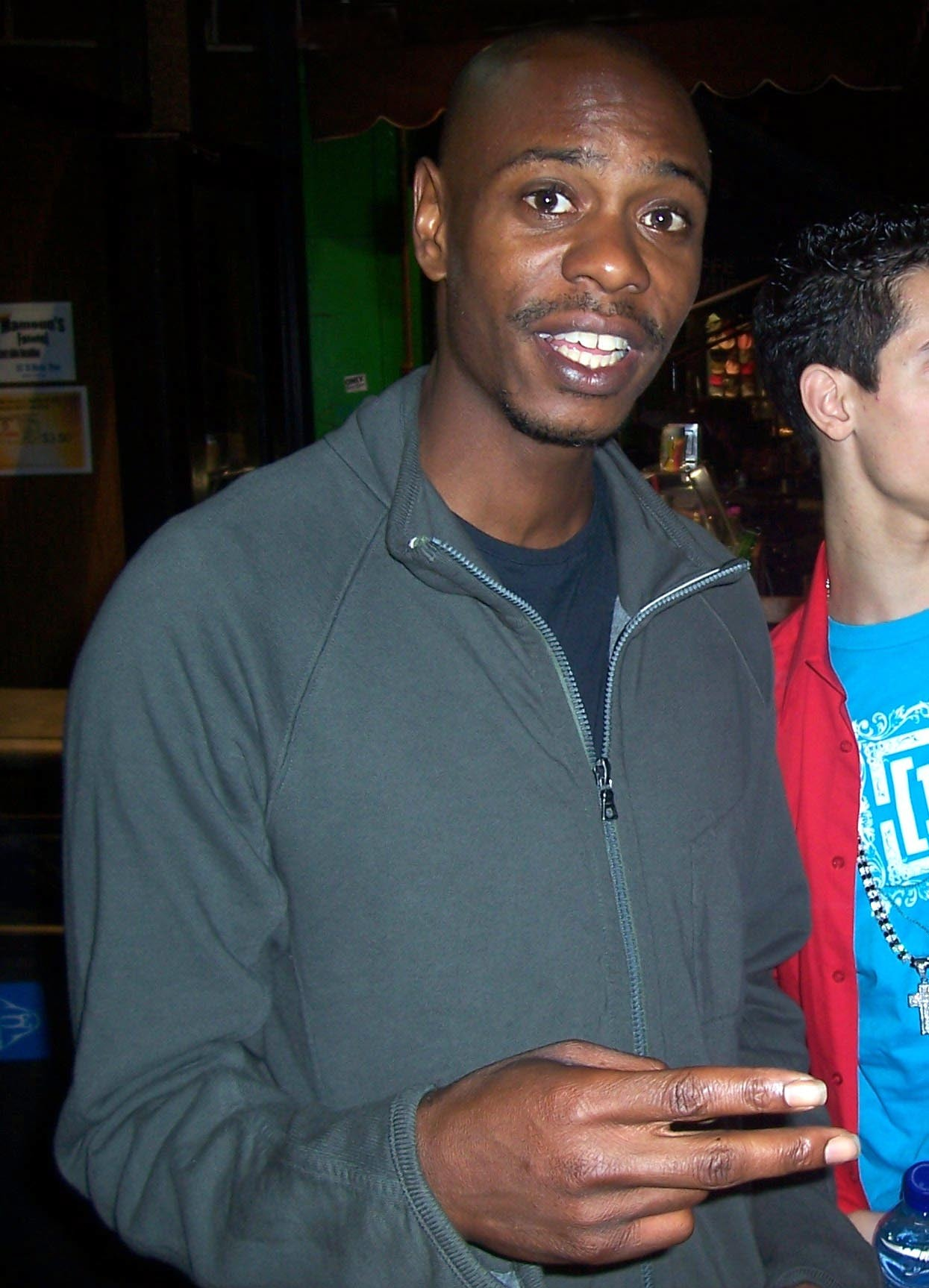
American comedian Dave Chappelle in 2007.

- Prince Abdi (born 1972) – British standup comedian, actor
- Baba Ali (born 1974) – Iranian-American comedian, games developer, businessman, and actor
- Ahmed Ahmed (born 1970)– American standup comedian, actor
- Mo Amer (born 1981) – Palestinian American standup comedian, actor
- Humza Arshad (born 1985) – English comedian
- Aristotle Athari (born 1991) — ְAmerican comedian and actor
- Sadia Azmat (born 1990) – English comedian
- Dave Chappelle (born 1973) – American standup comedian
- Jamel Debbouze (born 1975) – French Moroccan comedian, actor, singer
- Said Durrah (born 1982) – American standup comedian
- Fatiha El-Ghorri (born 1981) – British comedian, writer
- Negin Farsad (born 1978) – American comedian, director
- Dina Hashem – American comedian
- Maz Jobrani (born 1972) – American standup comedian, actor
- Zainab Johnson (born 1992) – African American comedian
- Hasan Minhaj (born 1985) – American standup comedian
- Jeff Mirza (born 1964) – British comedian, actor
- Riaad Moosa (born 1977) – South African comedian, actor, doctor
- Preacher Moss (born 1967) – American standup comedian, comedy writer
- Zahra Noorbakhsh (born 1980) – Iranian-American standup comedian, writer, actor, podcast host
- Dean Obeidallah (born 1969) – American standup comedian
- Aamer Rahman (born 1982) – Australian standup comedian
- Omar Regan (born 1975) – American standup comedian, actor, musician
- Ali Shahalom (born 1992) – English comedian, television presenter
- Jay Shareef (born 1982) – British comedian, broadcaster
- Ali Siddiq (born 1973) – American comedian
- Azhar Usman (born 1975) – American standup comedian
- Ramy Youssef (born 1991) – American standup comedian, actor
- Bilal Zafar (born 1991) – British comedian
- Maysoon Zayid (born 1974) – American standup comedian, actress

== Film and television ==
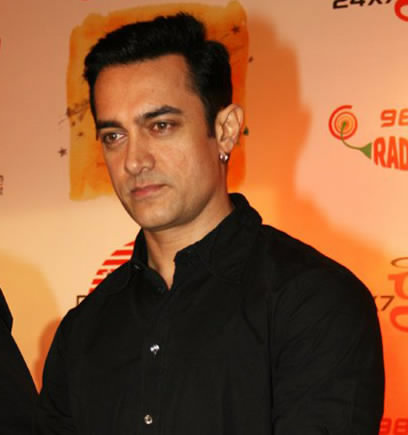
Indian film actor Aamir Khan, one of the Three Khans of Bollywood, in 2008.

- Khwaja Ahmad Abbas (1914-1987) – Indian director, novelist, screenwriter, journalist, Palme d'Or winner
- Nabil Abou-Harb (born 1984)– American filmmaker, writer-director of Arab in America
- Riz Ahmed (born 1982)– British actor, rapper, MC, activist, first Muslim actor to win Emmy for The Night Of.
- Mahershala Ali (born 1974) – American actor, first Muslim actor to win Oscar (for Moonlight)
- Mara Brock Akil (born 1970) – American screenwriter, producer
- Moustapha Akkad (1930-2005) – Syrian American film director, producer
- Yasmine Allas (born 1967) – Somali–Dutch actress, writer
- Kinda Alloush (born 1982) – Syrian British actress
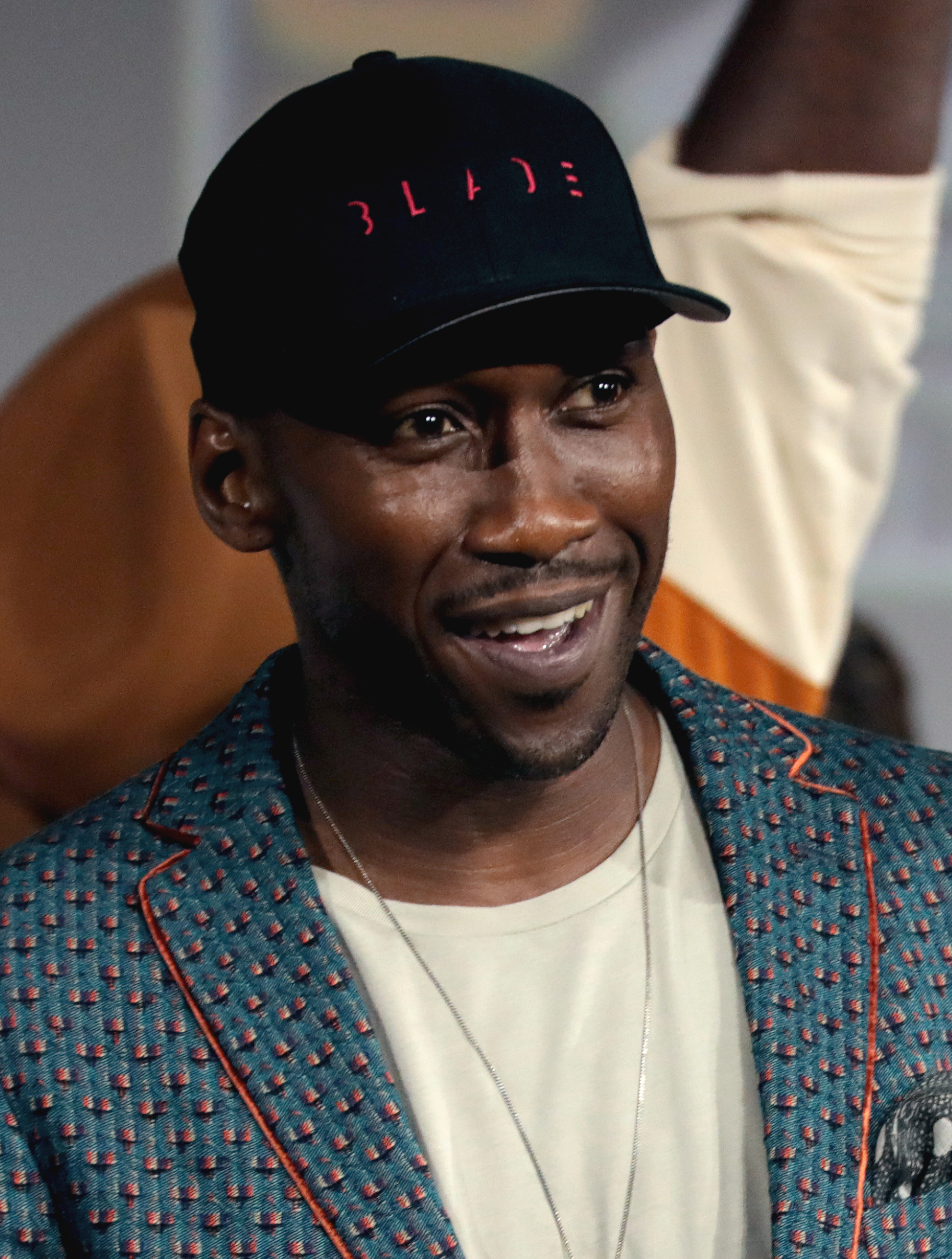
- Mahershala Ali
  Humza Arshad (born 1985) – British actor, comedian
- Lewis Arquette (1935-2001) – American film actor, writer, and producer
- Afshan Azad (born 1988) – British actress, model, and media personality
- Shabana Azmi (born 1950) – Indian actress in Bollywood films
- Sayed Badreya (born 1957) – Egyptian American actor, filmmaker
- Aslı Bayram (born 1981) – German actress, writer
- Leïla Bekhti (born 1984) – French actress
- Fady Elsayed (born 1993) – British actor
- Zehra Fazal – American voice actress
- Tan France (born 1983) – British American fashion designer, television personality
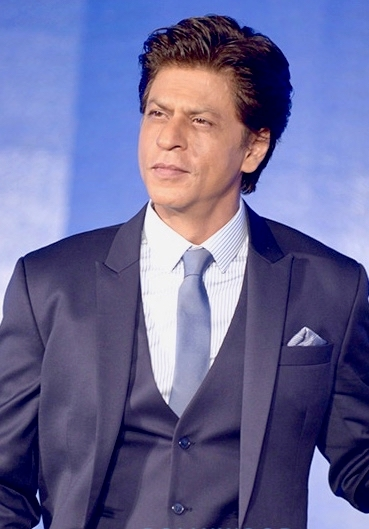
- Shah Rukh Khan,called 'Baadshah' of Bollywood
  Tania Gunadi (born 1983) – Indonesian actress in Hollywood
- Manal Issa (born 1992) – Lebanese-French actress
- Jaafar Jackson (born 1996) – American actor
- Dipika Kakar (born 1985) – Indian television actress
- Ronnie Khalil (born 1977) – American actor, comedian
- Aamir Khan (born 1965) – Indian actor, producer, director, Academy Award nominee
- Irrfan Khan (1967-2005) – Indian actor
- Guz Khan (born 1986) – British actor, comedian
- Mehboob Khan (1907-1964) – Indian director, producer, actor, writer, Academy Award nominee
- Saif Ali Khan (born 1970) – Indian actor, producer
- Salman Khan (born 1965) – Indian actor, film producer, television personality
- Shah Rukh Khan (born 1965) – Indian actor, producer, television presenter
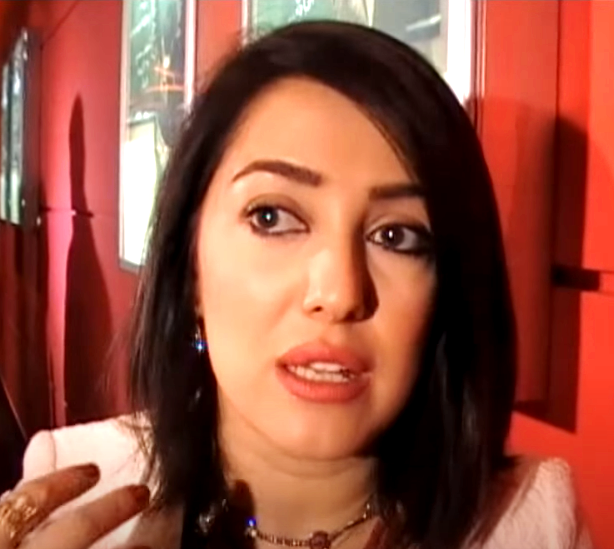
- Kinda Alloush,Syrian-British actress
  Dilip Kumar (Muhammad Yusuf Khan) (1922-2021) – Indian actor, producer, activist
- Karim Leklou (born 1982) – French actor
- Ali Louis Bourzgui (born 1999) – American actor and singer
- Madhubala (1933-1969) – Indian actress
- Mammootty (born 1951) – Indian Malayali actor
- Aasif Mandvi (born 1966) – British comedian, actor
- Rizwan Manji (born 1974) – Canadian actor
- Iman Meskini (born 1997) - Norwegian actress
- Ramzan Miah (born 1993) – British actor, model, and dancer
- Shebz Miah (born 1997) – British actor
- Mumtaz (born 1947) – Indian actress
- Kylie Padilla (born 1993) - Filipino actress, singer and model (converted to Islam from early childhood)
- Rommel Padilla (born 1965) - actor, politician, farmer and former musician (converted to Islam in 1999)
- Robin Padilla (born 1969) - Filipino actor and politician (converted to Islam in 1995)
- Kamran Pasha (born 1972) – American screenwriter, producer
- Tahar Rahim (born 1981) – French actor
- Waheeda Rehman (born 1938) – Indian actress in Bollywood films
- Dulquer Salmaan (born 1983) – Indian actor
- Shakila (1935-2017) – Indian actress in Bollywood films
- Shyama (1935-2017) – Indian actress in Bollywood films
- Ali Suliman (born 1977) – Palestinian-British actor
- Omar Sy (born 1978) – French actor
- Assa Sylla (born 1996) – French actress, writer
- Tabu (born 1971) – Indian actress in Bollywood films
- Saïd Taghmaoui (born 1973) – French-American actor
- Iqbal Theba (born 1963) – Pakistani American actor
- Bassem Youssef (born 1974) – Egyptian American satirist and columnist, former host of Al-Bernameg
- Zarina Wahab (born 1959) - Indian actress in Bollywood films

== Journalism and media ==
- Ali Abbasi (1961–2004) – former Scottish TV presenter
- Tazeen Ahmad (1971-2019) – British television and radio presenter and reporter
- Fareena Alam (born 1978) – Editor of British Muslim Magazine Q News. She was named Media Professional of the Year by Islamic Relief in 2005 and at the Asian Women of Achievement Awards in 2006.
- Lisa Aziz (born 1962) – British news presenter, and journalist. Best known as the co-presenter of the Bristol-based ITV West Country nightly weekday news programme The West Country Tonight, one of the first Asian presenters to be seen on television. She won the Ethnic Multicultural Media Academy Best Television News Journalist Award.
- Kristiane Backer (born 1965) – German television presenter, television journalist and author residing in London.
- Zeinab Badawi (born 1959) – Sudanese British BBC presenter of "Hard Talk"
- Cenk Uygur (born 1970) – American host on The Young Turks
- Shamim Chowdhury – English television and print journalist for Al Jazeera English.
- Mehdi Hasan (born 1979) – British American senior politics editor at the New Statesman and a former news and current affairs editor at Channel 4
- Ginella Massa (born 1987) – Canadian host of Canada Tonight on CBC News. Canada’s first hijab wearing national news anchor.
- Nina Hossain – English journalist, newscaster, and sole presenter of ITV London's regional news programme London Tonight.
- Kanak 'Konnie' Huq (born 1975) – British television presenter, best known for being the longest-serving female Blue Peter presenter.
- Mishal Husain (born 1973) – British, currently an anchor for BBC World
- Rizwan Hussain (born 1973) – British barrister, television presenter, philanthropist, international humanitarian worker, former Hindi music singer and producer. TV presenter for Islamic and charity shows on Channel S and Islam Channel.
- Zahid Hussain (author) (born 1972) – British writer and poet
- Faisal Islam (born 1977) – British economics editor and correspondent for Channel 4 News. He was named Young Journalist of the Year at the Royal Society of Television awards 2006.
- Nurul for Islam (1928–2006) – British Bangladesh broadcast journalist, radio producer, and presenter best remembered for his work with the BBC World Service.
- Saira Khan (born 1970) – British runner-up on the first series of The Apprentice, and now a TV presenter on BBC's Temper Your Temper and Desi DNA
- Tasmin Lucia-Khan (born 1980) – British journalist, presenter, and producer. Best known for delivering BBC Three's nightly hourly 'World News' bulletins on in 60 Seconds, and presenting E24 on the rolling news channel BBC News. Currently delivers news bulletins and breaking stories on ITV breakfast television programme Daybreak.
- Mazher Mahmood (born 1963) – British journalist
- Fatima Manji (born 1985) – British television journalist, Britain's first hijab-wearing TV newsreader
- Sarfraz Manzoor (born 1971) – British writer, journalist, documentary maker, and broadcaster. He writes regularly for The Guardian, presents documentaries on BBC Radio 4.
- Ajmal Masroor (born 1971) – British television presenter, politician, Imam, and UK Parliamentary candidate for Bethnal Green and Bow constituency representing Liberal Democrats in 2010 General Election. He is a television presenter on political and Islamic programmes on Islam Channel and Channel S.
- Shereen Nanjiani (born 1961) – British radio journalist with BBC Radio Scotland
- Adnan Nawaz – news and sports presenter working for the BBC World Service
- Amna Nawaz (born 1979) – Pakistani-American anchor and correspondent for PBS Newshour.
- Mehmet Oz (born 1960) – American medical doctor, talk show host
- A. N. M. Serajur Rahman (1934–2015) – British journalist, broadcaster, and Bangladeshi nationalist.
- Tahera Rahman (born 1991) – American newscaster for WHBF-TV and KLJB. Widely covered by the media for being the first American hijabi Muslim newscaster.
- Adil Ray (born 1991) – British radio and television presenter, for BBC Asian Network
- Fareed Zakaria (born 1964) – Indian American journalist and author, host of CNN's Fareed Zakaria GPS

== Literature and art ==
- Kia Abdullah (born 1982) – English novelist and journalist. She contributes to The Guardian newspaper and has written two novels: Life, Love and Assimilation and Child's Play.
- Nafeez Ahmed (born 1978) – British author, lecturer, political scientist specialising in interdisciplinary security studies, and participant of the 9/11 Truth Movement.
- Hamja Ahsan (born 1981) – British writer and activist
- Ayad Akhtar (born 1970) – American writer, actor
- Kaniz Ali (born 1985) – British makeup artist and freelance beauty columnist. She won Best Make-Up Artist category at the 2011 International Asian Fashion Awards.
- Monica Ali (born 1967) – British author of Brick Lane a story based on a Bangladeshi woman.
- Tariq Ali (born 1943) – British historian and novelist
- Arif Ali-Shah – British film and screenplay writer
- Moniza Alvi (born 1954) – Pakistani British poet and writer
- Tahmima Anam (born 1975) – British author of A Golden Age which was the Best First Book winner of the 2008 Commonwealth Writers' Prize.
- Nadeem Aslam (born 1966)– British-Pakistani novelist
- Reza Aslan (born 1972) – Iranian-American author of No god but God and Zealot, public intellectual, religious studies scholar
- Shamim Azad (born 1952) – British bilingual poet, storyteller and writer
- Sunara Begum (born 1984) – English visual artist and filmmaker
- Imtiaz Dharker – British poet and documentary filmmaker
- Rama Duwaji (born 1997) – American artist, First Lady of New York City
- Roopa Farooki – British novelist.
- Ruby Hammer MBE – British fashion and beauty makeup artist, and founder of Ruby & Millie cosmetics brand.
- Mohammed Mahbub 'Ed' Husain (born 1974) – British writer of the book The Islamist on account of his experience for five years with the Hizb ut-Tahrir.
- Razia Iqbal (born 1962) – Ugandan arts correspondent for the BBC; born in East Africa and is of Muslim Punjabi origin.
- Runa Islam (born 1970) – British film and photography visual artist, nominated for the Turner Prize 2008.
- Sofia Karim – British artist, human rights activist, and architect
- Hanif Kureishi (born 1954) – British playwright, screenwriter and filmmaker, novelist and short story writer
- Rohina Malik – American playwright, solo performance artist, story teller and speaker;
- Saiman Miah (born 1986) – British Bangladeshi architect and graphic designer
- Rahemur Rahman (born 1990) – British Bengali fashion designer and artist
- Shahida Rahman (born 1971) – English award-winning author of Lascar, writer and publisher
- Ramisha Sattar (born 1999) – American digital artist
- Qaisra Shahraz – British Pakistani novelist, journalist, Fellow of the Royal Society of Arts and a director of Gatehouse Books
- Rezia Wahid MBE (born 1975) – British award-winning textile artist whose work has been exhibited both in the UK and abroad.
- G. Willow Wilson (born 1982) – American comics writer, prose author, essayist, and journalist.
- Rekha Waheed – English writer and novelist best known as the author of The A-Z Guide To Arranged Marriage.
- Osman Yousefzada – British designer and artist
- Saladin Ahmed – American novelist, best known for writing Throne of the Crescent Moon.
- Sabaa Tahir – American novelist, wrote An Ember in the Ashes.

== Modeling ==
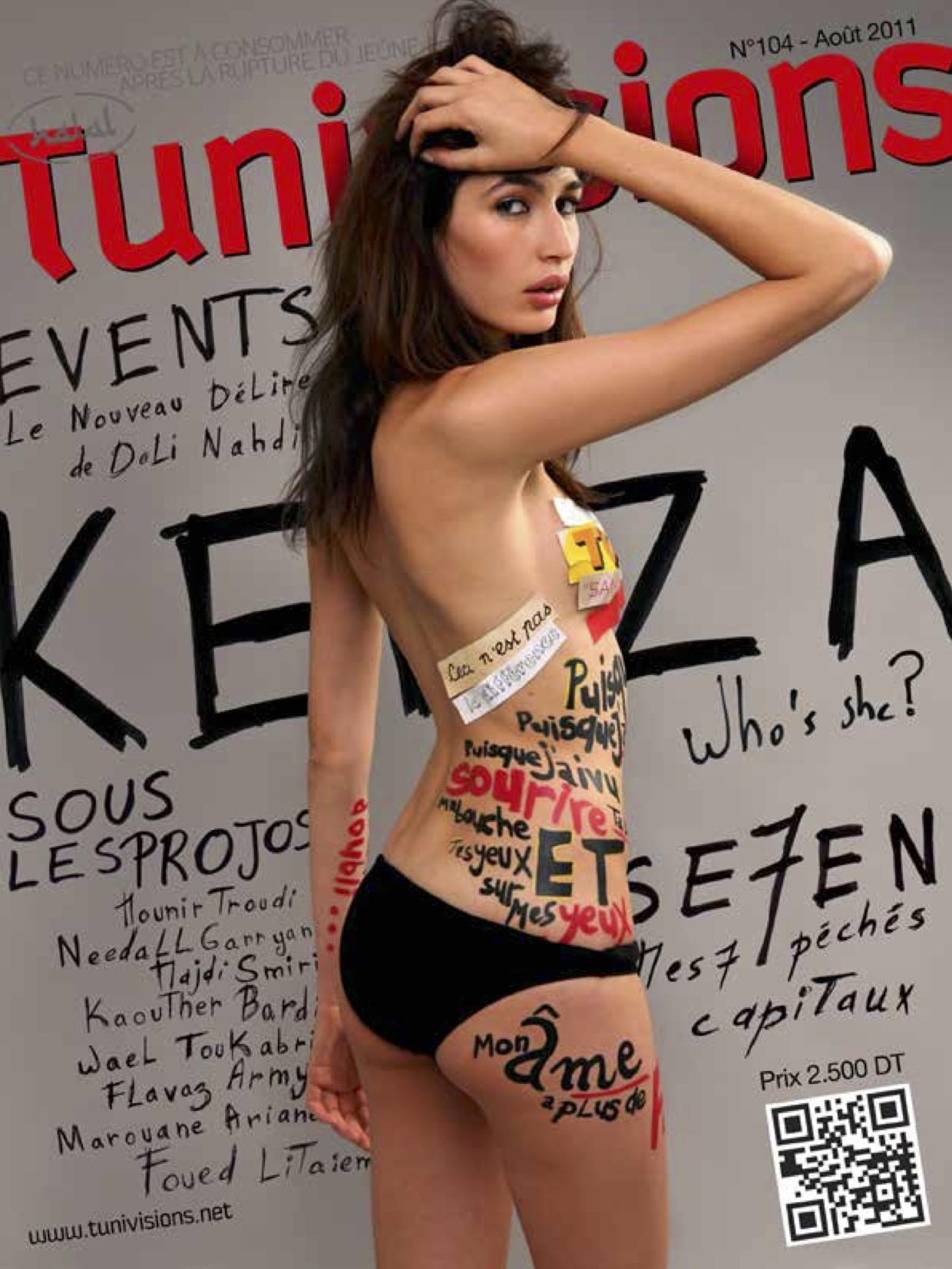
- Fourati on the cover of Tunivisions, August 2011
  Ugbad Abdi – Somali–American model
- Halima Aden – American fashion model, first Somali-American to compete and become a semi-finalist in the Miss Minnesota USA pageant.
- Hanaa Ben Abdesslem – Tunisian model, first Muslim spokesmodel for the French perfume and cosmetic house Lancôme.
- Kenza Fourati (born 1987) – Tunisian model, first Arab Muslim model to be featured in Sports Illustrated.
- Bella Hadid (born 1996) – American fashion model.
- Gigi Hadid (born 1995) – American fashion model.
- Imaan Hammam (born 1996) – Egyptian Dutch model
- Mariah Idrissi – British Moroccan and Pakistani model, public speaker, and online personality.
- Iman (Iman Mohamed Abdulmajid) (born 1955) – Model and designer, Muslim originally from Somalia.
- Farida Khelfa – Algerian and French model
- Hammasa Kohistani (born 1987) – British model
- Arjumman Mughal – Indian model and actress
- Katoucha Niane – French model, who was Yves Saint Laurent's egerie.
- Esma Voloder – Model and beauty pageant titleholder who was crowned Miss World Australia 2017.

== Music ==
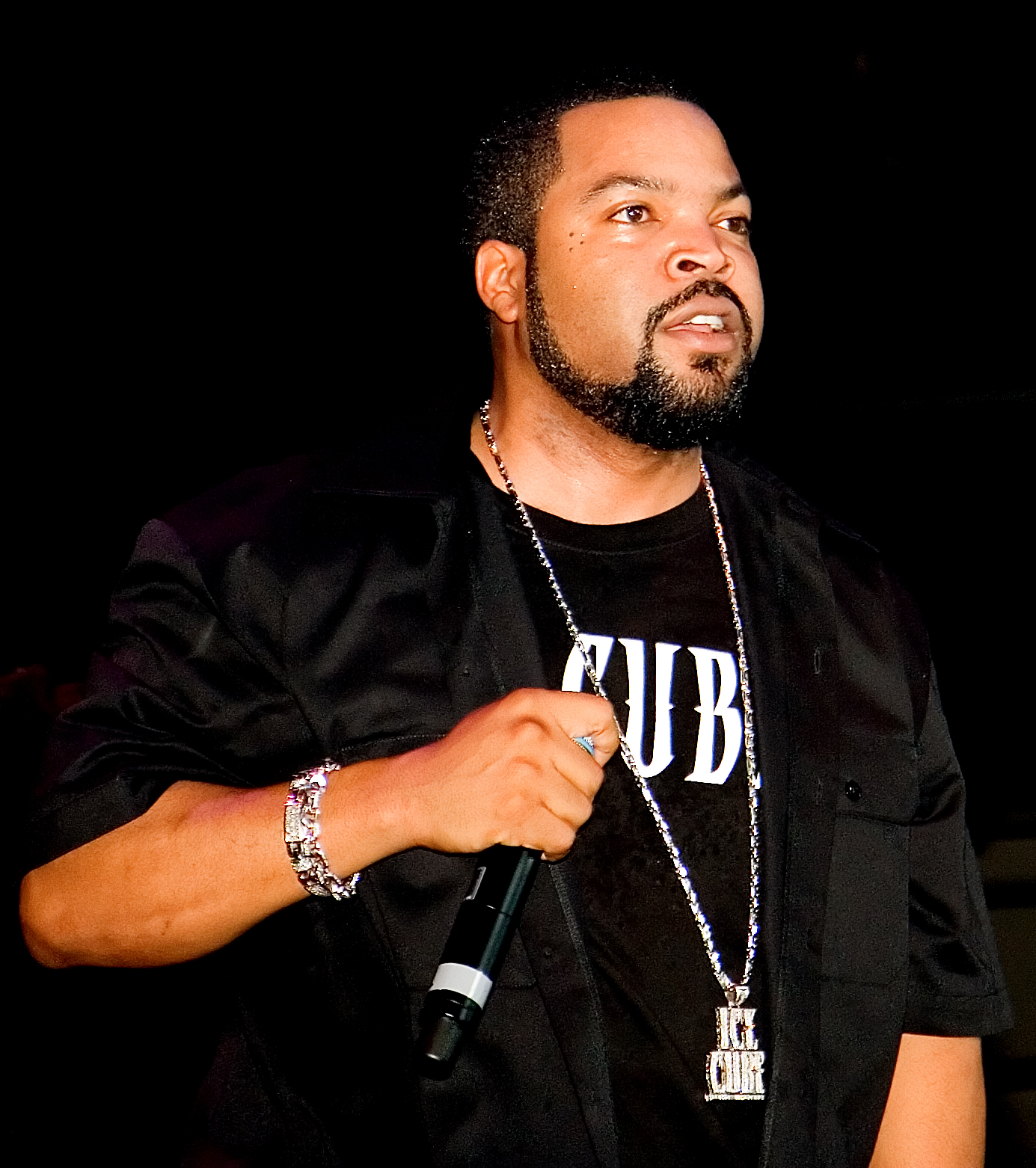
Rapper Ice Cube performing in 2006.

- Dalal Abu Amneh (born 1983) – Palestinian citizen of Israel singer, producer, and neuroscience. Follows Sufism.
- Brother Ali (born 1977) – rapper. Converted to Sunni Islam.
- Amira Unplugged – American rapper
- Anggun – singer World Music Award winner, songwriter, and television personality.
- Akon (born 1973) – singer
- Atif Aslam (born 1983) – Filmi singer
- Nazeel Azami (born 1981) – English singer
- Art Blakey (1919–1990) – American jazz drummer and bandleader
- Bas (born 1987) – rapper
- Beanie Sigel (born 1974) – rapper
- Big Daddy Kane – rapper. He is a 5 percenter.
- B.G. Knocc Out – rapper from Compton, California, (converted to Islam in 1999)
- Boef (born 1993) – Algerian-French rapper
- Busta Rhymes (born 1972) – hip-hop artist and rapper. He is a 5 percenter.
- Chali 2na (born 1971) – rapper. Formerly of the alternative hip-hop group Jurassic 5, and of Ozomatli
- Ice Cube (born 1969) – rapper, actor and producer.
- Native Deen – artist rap group
- Mos Def – rapper. Initially joined the Nation of Islam before converting to Sunni Islam.
- Lil Durk (born 1992) – American rapper
- Jay Electronica (born 1976) – rapper
- Ahmet Ertegün (1923–2006) – songwriter and founder of Atlantic Records
- Everlast (born 1969) – rapper from the Irish-American hip-hop group House of Pain. Converted to Sunni Islam.
- Fakemink (born 2005) – British rapper and producer
- Lupe Fiasco (born 1982) – rapper. He is a Sunni Muslim.
- Freeway (born 1978) – American rapper, Sunni Muslim
- Freddie Gibbs (born 1982) – American rapper
- Kevin Gates – rapper
- Ghostface Killah (born 1970) – rapper. Member of the hip-hip group the Wu-Tang Clan
- Mona Haydar – rapper
- M Huncho – British rapper
- Ahmad Hussain – British faith inspired singer/songwriter. Inducted into the Muslim Power 100 list. Founder of IQRA Promotions.
- Yusuf Islam (born 1948) – commonly known by his former stage name Cat Stevens, a British singer-songwriter, multi-instrumentalist, humanitarian, and education philanthropist.
- Ahmad Jamal (1930–2023) – jazz pianist
- Jermaine Jackson (born 1954) – singer, bass guitarist
- DJ Khaled (born 1975) – rap artist and DJ
- Yusef Lateef (1920–2013) – jazz musician and Grammy Award winner
- Dua Lipa (1995) pop singer
- French Montana (born 1984) – rapper
- Ali Shaheed Muhammad (born 1970) – producer, DJ and rapper. Formerly of A Tribe Called Quest. He is a Sunni Muslim.
- Napoleon (born 1977) – former member of Tupac Shakur's rap group the Outlawz, now a motivational Muslim speaker
- Nemahsis (born 1994) – Palestinian-Canadian singer
- Sinéad O'Connor (1966–2023) — Irish singer-songwriter. Converted to Islam in 2018
- Odetari – American rapper and singer
- Vinnie Paz – rapper in the hip-hop group Jedi Mind Tricks.
- Q-Tip – rapper. Formerly of A Tribe Called Quest. He is a Sunni Muslim.
- A. R. Rahman (born 1967) – Indian composer, singer-songwriter, music producer, musician, philanthropist
- Rakim (born 1968) – 5 percenter, rapper and former member of the hip-hop duo Eric B. & Rakim.
- MC Ren (born 1969) – rapper
- Rhymefest – Grammy Award-winning hip hop artist and co-writer of the single "Jesus Walks"
- Rondodasosa - Italian rapper
- Scarface (born 1970) – rapper
- Shaira (born 2001 or 2002) - Filipino singer, dubbed as the "Queen of Bangsamoro Pop"
- Mumzy Stranger – British rapper, singer, songwriter, and record producer
- Swizz Beatz (born 1978) – Producer
- SZA – American singer
- Richard Thompson (born 1949) – British singer-songwriter
- T-Pain (born 1984) singer, rapper
- Mushtaq Omar Uddin (born 1973) – English music producer, songwriter, and vocalist.
- Sheck Wes (born 1998) — Senegalese rapper and songwriter
- Dawud Wharnsby – Canadian singer-songwriter, poet

== YouTube and live streaming video sharing platforms. ==
- Anwar Jibawi – Palestinian-American YouTuber, social media influencer, actor, and dancer.
- Fouseytube – American YouTuber.
- Hasan Piker – Turkish-American online streamer, YouTuber, influencer, and left-wing political commentator.
- Nas Daily – Israeli-Palestinian YouTuber.
- Ali "SypherPK" Hassan – American YouTuber and Twitch streamer.
- Khaby Lame (born 2000) – Senegalese–Italian TikToker
- Hasbulla (born 2002) – Russian Internet personality

== See also ==
- Lists of Muslims
