= Ali Karoui =

Ali Karoui, born in 1986 in Tunis, is a Tunisian fashion designer and founder of Ali Karoui Coutures.

== Early life ==
Born in Tunis, Karoui joined the École supérieure des arts et techniques de la mode de Tunis (ESMOD Tunis) in 2003, graduating in 2005. That same year, he was awarded his first fashion design prize.

In 2012, he created his own label, Ali Karoui Coutures, also known as Karoui Luxury Fashion.

== Professional career ==
During his career, Karoui dressed many celebrities, including Hanaa Ben Abdesslem, Kenza Fourati, Rym Saïdi, Dorra Zarrouk, Latifa Arfaoui, Adèle Exarchopoulos, Nancy Ajram and Haifa Wehbe, as well as Miriam Odemba and Victoria Silvstedt. His creations have been noticed, notably at the Cannes Film Festival, and with the Netflix star Georgina Rodríguez at the Joy Awards. He collaborates with the jewelry brand Chopard.

In 2018, he took part in the Cannes Film Festival, setting up his showroom right next to the Hôtel Martinez. That same year, one of his dresses was chosen for the cover of the Russian edition of the fashion magazine L'Officiel.

In 2019, he participated in a fashion show organized at the fifteenth edition of the Casa Fashion Show in Casablanca, Morocco.

In 2023, Karoui designed a customized trench coat for Beyoncé, in just 10 hours, for her Renaissance World Tour performance at Dubai's Atlantis Hotel. The same year, Georgina Rodríguez closed the Joy Awards wearing a midnight-blue velvet dress designed by Ali Karoui.

== Awards ==
- 2014: Winner of the Mediterranean Fashion Prize 2014.
