= What's Love Got to Do with It? (2022 film) =

Film by Shekhar Kapur

- Theatrical release poster
- Directed by: Shekhar Kapur
- Written by: Jemima Goldsmith
- Produced by: Nicky Kentish Barnes; Jemima Khan; Tim Bevan; Eric Fellner
- Starring: Sajal Ali; Lily James; Shazad Latif; Shabana Azmi; Emma Thompson; Oliver Chris; Asim Chaudhry; Jeff Mirza; Alice Orr-Ewing; Rahat Fateh Ali Khan
- Cinematography: Remi Adefarasin
- Edited by: Guy Bensley; Nick Moore
- Music by: Nitin Sawhney
- Production companies: Working Title Films; Instinct Productions
- Distributed by: StudioCanal
- Release dates: 10 September 2022 (TIFF); 24 February 2023 (United Kingdom)
- Running time: 108 minutes
- Country: United Kingdom
- Languages: English; Urdu
- Box office: $11.1 million

What's Love Got to Do with It? is a 2022 British romantic comedy film directed by Shekhar Kapur and written by Jemima Khan. It stars Lily James, Shazad Latif, Shabana Azmi, Emma Thompson, Sajal Ali, Oliver Chris, Asim Chaudhry, Jeff Mirza, Alice Orr-Ewing and Rahat Fateh Ali Khan.

The film premiered at the Toronto International Film Festival on 10 September 2022, and, at the 17th Rome Film Festival the following month, won Best Comedy (the Ugo Tognazzi award). It was released in the United Kingdom on 24 February 2023 by StudioCanal to positive reviews.

== Plot ==
In London, filmmaker Zoe Stevenson documents the experience of her British-Pakistani next-door neighbours, in particular her childhood best friend Kazim "Kaz" Khan's arranged marriage to a bride from Pakistan. Adamant on an arranged marriage to keep his parents happy, Kaz insists that such marriages do work, when questioned by Zoe. Eventually, a Muslim "matchmaker" named Mo sets up a video call between Kaz and Maymouna, a young woman from Pakistan. Kaz takes a liking to her, but she seems hesitant.

Both Kaz's and Maymouna's families eventually agree to the marriage, and Kaz prepares to travel to Lahore, Pakistan. Zoe, documenting the entire process, follows them to Pakistan, learning more about Pakistani culture and traditions along the way. She is constantly nagged by her mother for failing to find a suitable man herself, and so through the trip, she hopes to learn more about whether a relationship with someone chosen by her parents could work.

In Pakistan, Kaz prepares for his wedding and is constantly interviewed by Zoe about details of his feelings towards Maymouna and the marriage. He is determined that if he keeps a positive attitude, the wedding will work out. However, on the inside Kaz seems to have his doubts too. Zoe mentions their first kiss in a treehouse behind their homes and he deflects by berating her for failing to find someone because she is too focused on finding the perfect person, so she does not allow anyone to get close to her.

On the henna night, Kaz observes Maymouna smoking marijuana, then drinking a large amount of alcohol and dancing wildly all over the floor. He comes to realise she is not the woman he thought she was. Frustrated and confused, Kaz leaves the event with Zoe and stumbles upon a Qawwali performance in the inner streets of Old Lahore. He explains to her what the Qawwal is singing about, which causes him to realise that his ideas of love align with Zoe's, but he has chosen to ignore them. Shortly afterwards, Kaz and Zoe try to explain their feelings to one another, but are not able to do so.

The next day, as Kaz marries Maymouna, Zoe witnesses an emotional rukhsati. On return to London, Zoe finally completes her film and begins dating James, a "stable" man her mother set her up with. With Zoe's film now completed, the Khan family is invited to a screening of the rough cut. On the same night, James breaks up with Zoe because he thinks she is in love with Kaz and he is merely her "plan B". Zoe becomes angry at her mother for setting her up with James in the first place, and accuses her of judging her for her choices.

Zoe's film ends up upsetting the Khan family for revealing that Kaz's sister, Jamila, had been disowned by the Khans for choosing to marry a white and Jewish man. The film is then rejected by Zoe's producers as it was filmed through a "white lens". However, Maymouna loves it and tells Zoe it is beautiful.

Over the next few weeks, Maymouna and Kaz's marriage gradually deteriorates as neither develops any feelings for the other. Kaz is determined to make it work, but he says the only way to make it work would be to pretend. Maymouna eventually confesses to Kaz that she is in love with someone else.

As Eid approaches, Zoe plans to travel to Turkey to take a break from all her emotional stress. Her mother insists that she admires Zoe for her independence and never judged her for any of the choices she made.

The Stevensons are invited over by the Khans for the Eid celebration and Kaz reveals to everyone that he is divorced. Kaz also invites back his estranged sister Jamila, her husband, and their baby. The family are finally reunited, and Jamila takes the baby to Nani Jan to hold. Zoe is overwhelmed by the reconciliation and leaves, but Kaz follows her. He finds her in the treehouse and they kiss, confessing their feelings for each other but promising to take things slowly.

== Cast ==
- Lily James as Zoe Stevenson
- Shazad Latif as Kaz Khan
- Shabana Azmi as Aisha Khan
- Emma Thompson as Cath Stevenson
- Sajal Ali as Maymouna
- Taj Atwal as Sumaira
- Oliver Chris as James
- Asim Chaudhry as Mo
- Jeff Mirza as Zahid Khan
- Alice Orr-Ewing as Helena
- Iman Boujelouah as Yasmin Khan
- Pakiza Baig as Nani Jan Khan
- Sindhu Vee as the fertility doctor
- Shahid Khan (a.k.a. Naughty Boy) as a wedding guest
- Rahat Fateh Ali Khan as himself

== Production ==
In November 2020, it was announced Lily James, Emma Thompson and Shazad Latif had joined the cast of the film, with Shekhar Kapur directing from a screenplay by Jemima Khan, who would also serve as a producer on the film, alongside Tim Bevan and Eric Fellner who would produce under their Working Title Films banner, with StudioCanal to distribute. In January 2021, Rob Brydon, Shabana Azmi, Sajal Ali and Asim Chaudhry joined the cast of the film; Brydon does not appear in the final film.

Principal photography began in December 2020.

== Reception ==
On the review aggregator website Rotten Tomatoes, 72% of 107 critics' reviews are positive, with an average rating of 6/10. The website's consensus reads: "What's Love Got to Do with It? is a standard issue romantic comedy in many respects, but a pair of appealing leads help make this love story more crowd-pleasing than not." Metacritic, which uses a weighted average, assigned the film a score of 59 out of 100, based on 22 critics, indicating "mixed or average" reviews.
