= Nora Attal =

British fashion model

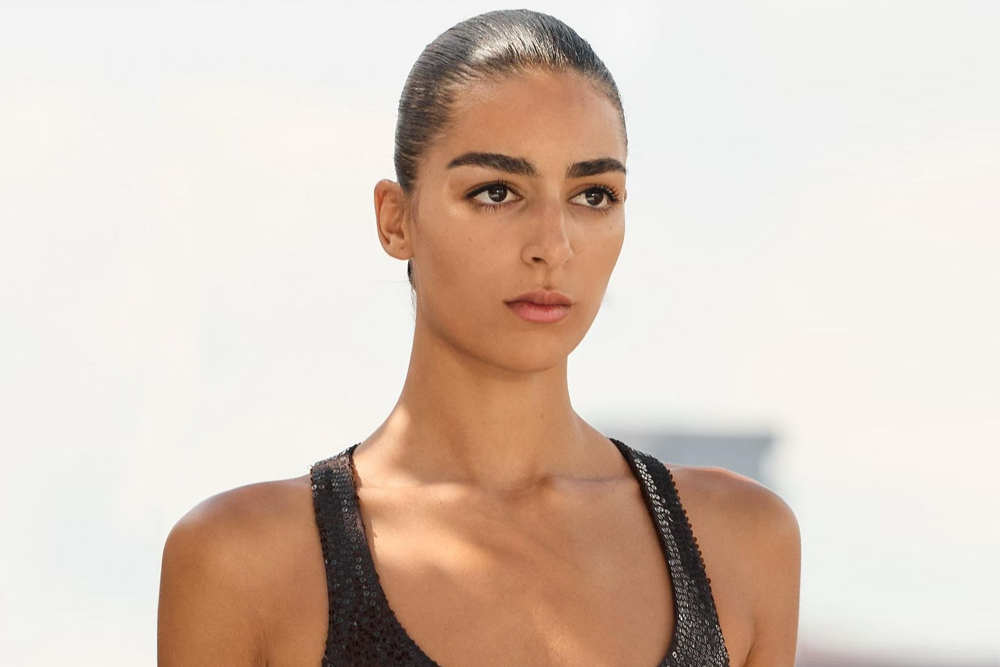
- Attal in 2023
- Born: Nora Maria Attal; 12 June 1999 (age 27); London, England
- Occupation: Fashion model
- Spouse: Victor Bastidas (m. 2022–2024)
- Modelling information
- Height: 1.76 m (5 ft 9 1/2 in)
- Hair colour: Brown
- Eye colour: Brown
- Agency: DNA Models (New York); VIVA Model Management (Paris, London, Barcelona)

Nora Maria Attal is a British fashion model. She has been on the cover of the September issue of British Vogue, Vogue Arabia, and Vogue. In January 2019 Attal ranked top 50 models and in 2022 listed as an Icon by models.com. She is listed in the Business of Fashion 500 shaping the global fashion industry.

== Early life and education ==
Attal was born to Moroccan parents Charhabil and Bouchra and grew up in Battersea, South London before moving to Worcester Park on the edge of Surrey and London. Attal attended Ewell Castle School, where she completed A Levels in History, Psychology, and Art. She later trained at the Baron Brown Studio in Los Angeles.

== Career ==
Attal was discovered by photographer Jamie Hawkesworth during a casting at her school for the JW Anderson campaign.

In 2017, Attal appeared on the final cover of British Vogue under Alexandra Shulman, alongside Kate Moss, Stella Tennant, Eddie Campbell and Jean Campbell. Later that year, Attal featured on the cover of Vogue Arabia.

She has modelled for Chanel, Fendi, Gucci, Prada, Valentino, Dior, Tom Ford, Dolce & Gabbana, Ferrari, Lacoste, MaxMara, Elie Saab, Acne Studios, Burberry, Loewe, Oscar de la Renta, Jason Wu, Stella McCartney, Coperni, Couregge, Nina Ricci, Chloé, Altuzarra, Céline, Prabal Gurung, Longchamp, Tommy Hilfiger, Mary Katrantzou, Hermès, Roberto Cavalli, Michael Kors, Sonia Rykiel and Alexander McQueen.

In 2016, models.com ranked her as a “Top Newcomer”.

== Personal life ==
As of 2020, Nora Attal lived in West London. From 2022 to 2024, she was married to Ecuadorian filmmaker Víctor Bastidas.
