= Deena Aljuhani Abdulaziz =

Saudi-American businesswoman, editor, and member of the Saudi royal family

Deena Aljuhani دينا الجهني
- Born: December 26, 1974 (age 51); California, United States
- Spouse: Prince Sultan bin Fahad bin Nasser bin Abdulaziz (m. 1998)
- Issue: 3
- House: Saud (by marriage)
- Father: Ali al-Juhani
- Occupation: Businesswoman, editor

Princess Deena Ali Al-Juhani (Arabic: دينا علي الجهني; born 26 December 1974) is a Saudi American businesswoman and editor. She is the founder and owner of DNA Store in Riyadh. She married into the Saudi royal family and is a former editor-in-chief of Vogue Arabia.

== Birth and personal life ==
She was born in California, the daughter of former Saudi communications minister Ali al Juhani. She grew up living a mobile life between the Middle East and the United States as her father was an economist, teaching at several American universities. She became a member of the House of Saud following her marriage to Prince Sultan bin Fahd bin Nasser bin Abdulaziz in 1998, a grandson of Nasser bin Abdulaziz Al Saud. They have three children, a daughter and twin boys.

== Career ==
She became interested in fashion after seeing a copy of the British magazine Tatler, at six years old. "I was studying every magazine from cover to cover, I was eager for everything related to fashion," she says. After attending several international fashion shows, she decided to open her store "D'NA" in Riyadh in 2006, which can only be bought from through membership or personal invitation from Abdulaziz. In 2013, a branch of the store opened in Doha, Qatar. After a decade of successful business in the Persian Gulf region, Abdulaziz launched an e-shopping website called DNACHIC.com. "The store contributes fashion designers to Middle Eastern customers. In September 2016, Abdulaziz was appointed editor-in-chief of Vogue Arabia in her first number and continued on the job for a short period before being expelled due to a dispute with the magazine's management.
