= Badman (web series) =

- Created by: Humza Arshad
- Based on: Diary of a Bad Man
- Written by: Humza Arshad
- Directed by: Mazzi Cuzzi
- Starring: Humza Arshad; Char Avell; DJ Limelight; Theo Johnson; Zak Snoke
- Narrated by: Humza Arshad
- Opening theme: "Badman Theme"
- Composers: Lyan Roze, DJ Limelight, DDark
- Country of origin: United Kingdom
- Original language: English
- No. of seasons: 2
- No. of episodes: 13

Production
- Producer: Humza Arshad
- Production locations: Streatham, London, United Kingdom
- Editor: Humza Arshad
- Running time: 30–60 minutes
- Production company: Humza Productions

Original release
- Network: YouTube
- Release: 19 October 2015

Related
- DOABM Shorts; Badman's Britain; Bubblegum; Black and Brown; Badman Blogs; Badman's World "Diary of a Bad Man"

Badman is a British comedy drama web series that premiered on YouTube in October 2015. It has since had 13 episodes, Ten with the first series, and three thus far into the second series, as of 15 February 2023. The series is created by Humza Arshad and consists of continuous episodes uploaded on his YouTube channel Humza Productions, following the next chapter in the Diary of a Badman world. Humza is now maturing from boy to man, and takes himself down a path of darkness, but learns life's most important lessons on his journey to the light.

== Development ==
The original music is provided by DJ Limelight, Lyan Roze and DDark.

=== Characters ===
- Humza Arshad as Humza (Badman): The main character of the series and also the narrator of the story in each episode.
- Sayfuz Ali as Avell: Humza's friend from prison who later betrays him by stabbing Humza, but then he later joins him to get his revenge on TJ.
- Mohammed Umar Baig as Umar: Humza's best friend, often ridiculed by Humza and the group for being overweight.
- Humza Arshad also as Mr Arshad (Mr Bubblegum): Humza's father, who owned a shop called Bubblegum and later The Chewing Gums.
- Noor: Humza's sister who was shot at the end of the first series.
- Anusha Sareen as Anisa: Humza's friend from school and formerly the best friend of Yasmin.
- Zak Snoke as TJ: Humza's enemy and the main antagonist of the first season, who ruins Humza's life; he is later arrested.
- Theo Johnson as Ace: Smokey's right-hand man who is later revealed to be working for his cousin, TJ. He ends up at the top of the chain at the end of the first season, and teams up with Humza in the second season to find out who shot Humza's sister. Antagonist
- DJ Limelight as Smokey: A notorious drug dealer, who is revealed to be Avell's boss. Humza winds up working for Smokey and leading him to the location of Avell after he stabs Humza and robs one of Smokey's traphouses. He loses everything after V and Ace kidnap him and steal his traphouses.
- Voltaire Taiwo-de-Campos as V: A businessman who kills Caesar and eventually ends up controlling all of Smokey's traphouses and weapons, to later be shot and killed by Ace on TJ's command.
- Fayaaz Kassam as Fayaaz: Humza's friend.
- David Whitely as Rebeka with a 'K': Ace's informant and a snitch from Birmingham, who later becomes friends with Humza.
- Nobuse Junior as Tyrone: TJ's closest friend who learns about Yasmin's death and is presumed dead after he is betrayed and stabbed by TJ.
- Sammy T as Sammy: A dumb friend of Humza who foils nearly every plan.
- Jay Ahmed as Jay: Humza's cousin and Yasmin's boss, until she stops showing up. He is beaten up when he threatens to disclose information to the police about TJ.
- Jazzie Zonzolo as Jazzie: Humza's friend (cameo appearance).
- Adil Malik as Prince: V's right-hand man who is involved in a shootout against Humza when he and Avell team up to rescue Smokey from his kidnapping.

== Episodes ==
Created and written by Humza Arshad. Directed by Mazzi Cuzzi.

Episodes Information
Season	Episode Number	Episode Title	Run Time	Episode Release Date	Trailer
1	1	Badman 1	13:37	19 October 2015	1
1	2	Badman 2	22:17	26 November 2015	2
1	3	Badman 3	29:00	4 January 2016	3
1	4	Badman 4	30:05	11 March 2016	4
1	5	Badman 5	35:12	2 June 2016	5
1	6	Badman 6	33:36	30 July 2016	6
1	7	Badman 7	41:17	21 October 2016	7
1	8	Badman 8	51:46	17 April 2017	8
1	9	Badman 9	57:36	31 October 2017	9
1	10	Badman 10	1:23:38	1 July 2018	10
2	11	Badman 11	47:51	15 November 2019	11
2	12	Badman 12	54:51	29 October 2020	12
2	13	Badman 13	1:22:20	15 February 2023	13
