= Nabil Abdulrashid =

British Nigerian comedian (born 1985)

- Born: Mohamed Nasir Nabil Abdul Rashid bin Suleman Obineche; London, England

Comedy career
- Years active: 2008–present
- Medium: Stand-up, television
- Genres: Observational comedy, Satire, Sketch comedy, Improvisational comedy
- Subjects: Racism, Islamophobia, Fascism, Islamic humour, Culture, Society, Gang culture, Stereotypes, Human interaction
- Website: nabilabdulrashid.com

Mohamed Nasir Nabil Abdul Rashid bin Suleman Obineche, known as Nabil Abdulrashid is an English comedian. In 2010, at the age of 25, he became the youngest black comedian to perform stand-up at the Hammersmith Apollo.

== Early life ==
Nabil Abdulrashid was born Mohamed Nasir Nabil Abdul Rashid bin Suleman Obineche was born in North London, England, to a medical doctor father and a politician/businesswoman mother.

Abdulrashid's father studied medicine in the Soviet Union (now Russia), while the Soviets were training African doctors. His father married his first wife, an Afghan woman, during the Russo-Afghan War. His father then moved to England and opened up a hospital. He then moved back to Nigeria, where he met Abdulrashid's mother, before moving back to England.

In 1990, Abdulrashid and his family moved to Kaduna, Nigeria. He travelled around the world at a young age and had a private school education. He attended Essence International School.

In 2006, he moved back to England to live in South Croydon, London In 2012, Abdulrashid graduated with a BA in Drama and Applied theatre from St. Mary's University College in Twickenham.

== Career ==
Nabil Abdulrashid performs as a stand-up comedian. In 2010, at the age of 25, Abdulrashid became the youngest black comedian to perform stand-up at the Hammersmith Apollo, after being crowned joint winner of the national "Which Religion Is Funniest?" competition. The competition was judged by David Baddiel and Omid Djalili, and the winners were chosen to perform at the premiere of their film The Infidel.

Abdulrashid has performed at Comedy Cafe, Comedy Store, Jongleurs and Choice FM Comedy Club.

From 2009 to 2010, Abdulrashid wrote, acted and directed on The Show Sho Show, which aired on Channel AKA. He has written for comedians on panel shows and worked on a sketch show with the producers of Little Miss Jocelyn and 3 Non-Blondes.

Abdulrashid has toured with his religious comedy show Don't Panic, I'm Islamic! In July 2011, he toured four UK cities in the Peace Youth and Community Trust's (PYCT) first Muslim Comedy Tour, alongside comedians Jeff Mirza, Nazim Ali, Humza Arshad and Prince Abdi. In November 2011, he took his Asia vs. Africa Comedy Clash show to 10 cities around the United Kingdom. In May 2012, he spent two weeks using theatre to educate children in Malawi on HIV.

Abdulrashid delivers a comedy workshop encouraging inner-city children to use comedy as an alternative form of expression at schools across London.

In January 2013, Abdulrashid co-founded Norbury Comedy Club with Ola Gbaja, with a show due to take place every Sunday in partnership with Baba Foundation restaurant.

In April 2013, Abdulrashid appeared on Channel 4's 4thought.tv. In October 2014, he performed on BBC Local Radio.

In July 2015, he performed at Eid Special Comedy Night at The Comedy Store in London.

In December 2016, he appeared on two-part BBC Two documentary Muslims Like Us.

In May 2020, Abdulrashid appeared on Britain's Got Talent and got a Golden Buzzer from Alesha Dixon which took him straight to the semi-final. In October, after winning the judges' vote, he advanced to the final, where he finished in fourth place. Almost 1,000 people complained about his performance in the semi-final and another 2,200 about the final. They were all rejected by media watchdog Ofcom, who said: "The comedian's satirical take on his life experiences as a black Muslim was likely to have been within audience expectations."

Since 2021, Nabil has appeared on a number of TV shows including: 8 Out of 10 Cats Does Countdown, Have I Got News For You, The Last Leg, The Big Narstie Show, Big Zuu's Big Eats, QI and Sorry I Didn't Know. He has twice appeared on Live At The Apollo, including once as host.

In 2023, Abdulrashid was one of the seven celebrities who participated in Pilgrimage: The Road through Portugal, a BBC Two series about a multi-faith pilgrimage to Fátima.

In 2024, Nabil voiced multiple characters for Disney's Iwájú, an original animated series set in a futuristic Lagos, Nigeria.

== Comedy style ==
Abdulrashid switches from surreal to satirical in his dichotomy of being a middle-class educated man yet simultaneously a street-smart urban youth while avoiding clichés when dealing with topics such as being a black Muslim in south London. He switches accent and language, speaking French, Patois, Urdu and Somali and blending them into his material.

== Conviction ==
In 2006, Abdulrashid was convicted of fraud, after a drug importation trial against him collapsed. He was sentenced to three years, but was released after serving a 15-month prison term.

== Views ==
In August 2011, Abdulrashid responded on YouTube to David Starkey's comments on the BBC's Newsnight programme, made during a discussion about the England riots, claiming that "the whites have become black" and that "a particular sort of violent, destructive, nihilistic, gangster culture has become the fashion". Abdulrashid spoke about the history of colonialism in Africa and how black culture should not be equated with criminality.

In May 2013, Abdulrashid responded on YouTube to the murder of Lee Rigby in Woolwich on 22 May 2013, outlining his perception of alleged media double standards and far-right wing groups using the circumstances as propaganda to justify their own views.

== Personal life ==
Abdulrashid has attention deficit hyperactivity disorder. He campaigns against knife and gun crime.

Abdulrashid has referred to himself as Hausa, saying half his family speak Hausa and half speak Igbo. He grew up speaking English, Hausa, Igbo, Arabic and French.

In September 2011, Abdulrashid married. His wife is British Pakistani-Punjabi.

== See also ==
- Islamic humour
- British Nigerian
