= Prince Abdi =

British stand-up comedian and actor

- Born: 21 July 1982 (age 44); Somalia

Comedy career
- Years active: 2009–present
- Medium: Stand-up, television, Web series
- Genres: Observational comedy, Sketch comedy
- Subjects: Somali culture, Society

Prince Abdi (born 21 July 1982) is a British stand-up comedian and actor.

== Early life ==
Abdi was born in Somalia and immigrated to the United Kingdom with his family in the 1980s at the age of eleven. He was thereafter brought up in Brixton, London where he attended Walworth Secondary School.

Abdi had football trials with Millwall F.C. and Dulwich Hamlet F.C. However, he abandoned the sport at the age of 15 after incurring a severe knee injury.

In 2007, Abdi graduated from Thames Valley University, University of West London with a BA (Hons) in Media.

== Stand-up career ==
Abdi was originally a primary school teacher, and taught in Brixton and Kilburn/West Hampstead. In his spare time, he performed free comedy shows for a lengthy period to establish himself on the stand-up circuit. He eventually gave up his part-time job at B&Q, where he had worked on weekends for ten years, and quit teaching to pursue a comedic career full-time. In 2008, Abdi was reportedly the only Somali comedian working in Britain.

He has since performed at some of the more established comedy clubs on the United Kingdom circuit, including Hackney Empire, Edinburgh Festival (2007), Trafalgar Square (Eid in the Square), Jongleurs (Various), The Comedy Store, Banana Cabaret, Belfast Empire (Northern Ireland), Up-The-Creek, Headliners, The Broadway Theatre, Hounslow Theatre, The Glee Club (Birmingham), Alexander Palace, Rise Festival and Jive Cape Town Funny Festival.

Besides the UK, Abdi has also done stand-up shows in Canada, the United States, Holland, Northern Ireland, Kenya and Turkey. He has performed alongside other comedians, including Jack Whitehall, Dave Chappelle, Stephen K. Amos and Reginald D. Hunter.

Additionally, Abdi has done various tours with other Muslim comedians. In July 2008, he performed at the Islam Expo in Olympia, London. In July 2011, he toured four UK cities in the Peace Youth and Community Trust's (PYCT) first Muslim Comedy Tour, alongside Jeff Mirza, Humza Arshad and Nabil Abdul Rashid.

In 2013, he performed a whole month at the Cape Town Comedy Festival. He then performed at the monthly Laughter Factory comedy tour, which started at Heroes in Abu Dhabi's Crowne Plaza before heading to Dubai and Doha. In July 2015, he performed at an Eid Special Comedy Night at The Comedy Store in London.

In June 2015, Abdi made a short film My First Fast as part of the British Muslim Comedy series, five short films by Muslim comedians commissioned by the BBC and released on BBC iPlayer. Abdi used flashbacks and period details to recall his childhood trials of his first fast at the age of seven.

In January 2016, he performed at the fifth edition of the comedy show Arabs Are Not Funny in London.

Abdi has also performed at Somali community events. He continues to perform stand-up comedy throughout Britain and internationally. He is currently on tour around the London area whilst writing new and original comedy pieces on-the-go.

== Television career ==
Abdi has written and starred in his own television sketch for the BBC, Comedy Central and ITV, as well as comedy and drama features. He has performed on Comedy Central's The World Stands Up, BBC Three's Laughter Shock and ITV's FHM Stand Up Hero and ITV's Show Me The Funny. His other credits include BBC's The Wall, Channel 4's Channel 4 Presents, BBC's The Jason Lewis Experience. His acting credits include Part 10 of Diary of a Bad Man and Laughing Stock.

In July 2011, Abdi appeared on the ITV reality programme Show Me The Funny. After he was in the bottom two comedians for the second week running, he became the second contestant to be voted off, as decided by judges Alan Davies, Kate Copstick and guest Bob Mortimer.

== Comedy style and reception ==
Abdi's comedy style has been described as original, confident, refreshing, pacy, upbeat, and infectious. Reviews of his stand-up performances have also emphasised his connection with the audience.

His comedy material draws from his roots in Somalia, growing up in Brixton, observations, and general topics.

== Awards, nominations and recognition ==
In 2009, Abdi won the Your Comedy Star competition at the Edinburgh Festival Fringe. He was also nominated "Best Newcomer" in the Black Entertainment Comedy Awards, and came third in the Revels Chortle Student Comedy Awards.

In 2011, Abdi came joint second in The Barbican Hackney Empire New Act of the Year competition.

== See also ==
- Islamic humour
- Somalis in the United Kingdom
