= Sofia Karim =

London-based British artist, human rights activist, and architect (Liverpool, 1976)

Sofia Karim (Liverpool, 1976) is a London-based British artist, human rights activist, and architect. Work from Karim's Turbine Bagh project is held in the collection of the Victoria and Albert Museum in London. Her activism focuses on human rights in Bangladesh and India, although has also included solidarity with Palestine through the project Architects for Palestine (AFP), which donates to Medical Aid for Palestinians (MAP).

== Early life ==
Karim was born in Liverpool in the 1970s to Bangladeshi parents. She is the middle of three sisters. The family moved to Libya for her parents' work when she was an infant, returning to the UK when she was seven.

== Work as an architect ==
She has worked as an architect for over 20 years, including at Foster and Partners in London and at Peter Eisenman in New York City.

== Art and activism ==
Karim's Turbine Bagh protest art project began in solidarity with the Muslim women of the 2019–2020 Shaheen Bagh protest in Delhi, against the Indian government's Citizenship Amendment Act. Karim invites artists, writers and thinkers to send designs for samosa packets, which she prints and assembles. Typically these bags, which are used to wrap the popular South Asian snack, are made from old newspaper—a format which Turbine Bagh mimics. The project has evolved into a platform that campaigns for the release of political prisoners in South Asia and raises awareness of human rights injustices across the world.

== Personal life ==
Her uncle is the photojournalist, social activist and educator Shahidul Alam.

== Exhibitions ==
=== Exhibitions with contributions by Karim ===
- Shahidul Alam: Truth to Power, a retrospective of work by Shahidul Alam, Rubin Museum of Art, New York City, November 2019 – January 2021. Included a 3D model of Dhaka Central Jail, Keraniganj by Karim.

=== Group exhibitions ===
- Jameel Prize: Poetry to Politics, Victoria and Albert Museum, London, September – November 2021. Work nominated for the Jameel Prize, included Karim's Turbine Bagh.
- Turbine Bagh was part of Documenta fifteen, Kunsthaus Göttingen, Göttingen, Germany, June–September 2022
- Divided Selves: Legacies, Memories, Belonging, Herbert Art Gallery and Museum, Coventry, 2023
- Acts of Resistance: Photography, Feminisms and the Art of Protest, South London Gallery, London, 8 March – 9 June 2024

== Collections ==
Karim's work is held in the following permanent collection:

- Victoria and Albert Museum, London: 20 samosa packets from Turbine Bagh (as of 9 March 2024)
