= Rawdah Mohamed =

Somali-Norwegian model, media personality and activist

- Born: Somalia
- Occupations: Social media influencer, model, blogger, activist, healthcare professional
- Years active: 2019–present

Rawdah Mohamed is a Norwegian-Somali model, Instagram model, blogger, healthcare professional and activist. She is known for her street style modelling and also regarded as a prominent advocate for the rights of Muslim women. She is currently represented by the model management company The Society Management. In April 2021, she started the hashtag campaign #Handsoffmyhijab, which became trending in social media.

== Biography ==
Rawdah was born in Somalia and started wearing a headscarf at the age of seven. She moved to Norway with her family at the age of eight and pursued her primary education. In Norway, she was subjected to racism, abuse, and bullying by her fellow school classmates especially for wearing a hijab and for her skin colour.

== Career ==
She initially pursued her career as a social media personality and now has over 200,000 followers on Instagram. In addition, she had served as a healthcare professional working with children who were affected with autism. Rawdah has also worked as a behavioral analyst dealing with mentally disabled people.

She had engaged in modelling campaigns in Arab style prior to engaging as a model in various western fashion shows such as Oslo Fashion Week, Paris Fashion Week, Copenhagen Fashion Week and Norwegian celebrity gala Kjendisgallaen.

She pursued her international street style career at the Oslo Fashion Week in August 2019, which was deemed as a turning point in her modelling career where she adapted to western style of modelling. During Oslo Fashion Week 2019, she was acknowledged for her intriguing street style. Rawdah revealed that she faced humiliation and rejections, especially in the fashion industry, whereas clients were hesitant to give her opportunity to feature in Paris Fashion Week citing outrage and backlash from French politicians.

She made her maiden appearance on a magazine cover in August 2019 when she appeared on the cover of Norwegian fashion magazine Costume Norge. Since then, Rawdah has also appeared in front pages of prominent publications and editorials such as Vogue and V Magazine in US as well as Arab editions.

She also notably took part in social media protest against the French Senate's decision to ban Muslim girls under the age of 18 from wearing a headscarf in public places by initiating hashtag campaign #Handsoffmyhijab. She posted her selfie on Instagram with the phrase "hands off my hijab" being written on her hand, criticising the proposed French ban on face covering for minors.

In May 2021, she was officially named as the editor of upcoming magazine Vogue Scandinavia, which is set to be launched soon. She will thus become the first hijab-wearing editor of colour for a fashion magazine.

== Controversies ==
She attracted mainstream media attention in Norway when she posted a series of negative comments towards Elizabeth II as responses to the news of her death. Mohamed announced that she was celebrating the Queen's death, and followed up with a number of offensive outbursts directed at the Queen, who had just died.
