= Halima Aden =

Somali/American fashion model

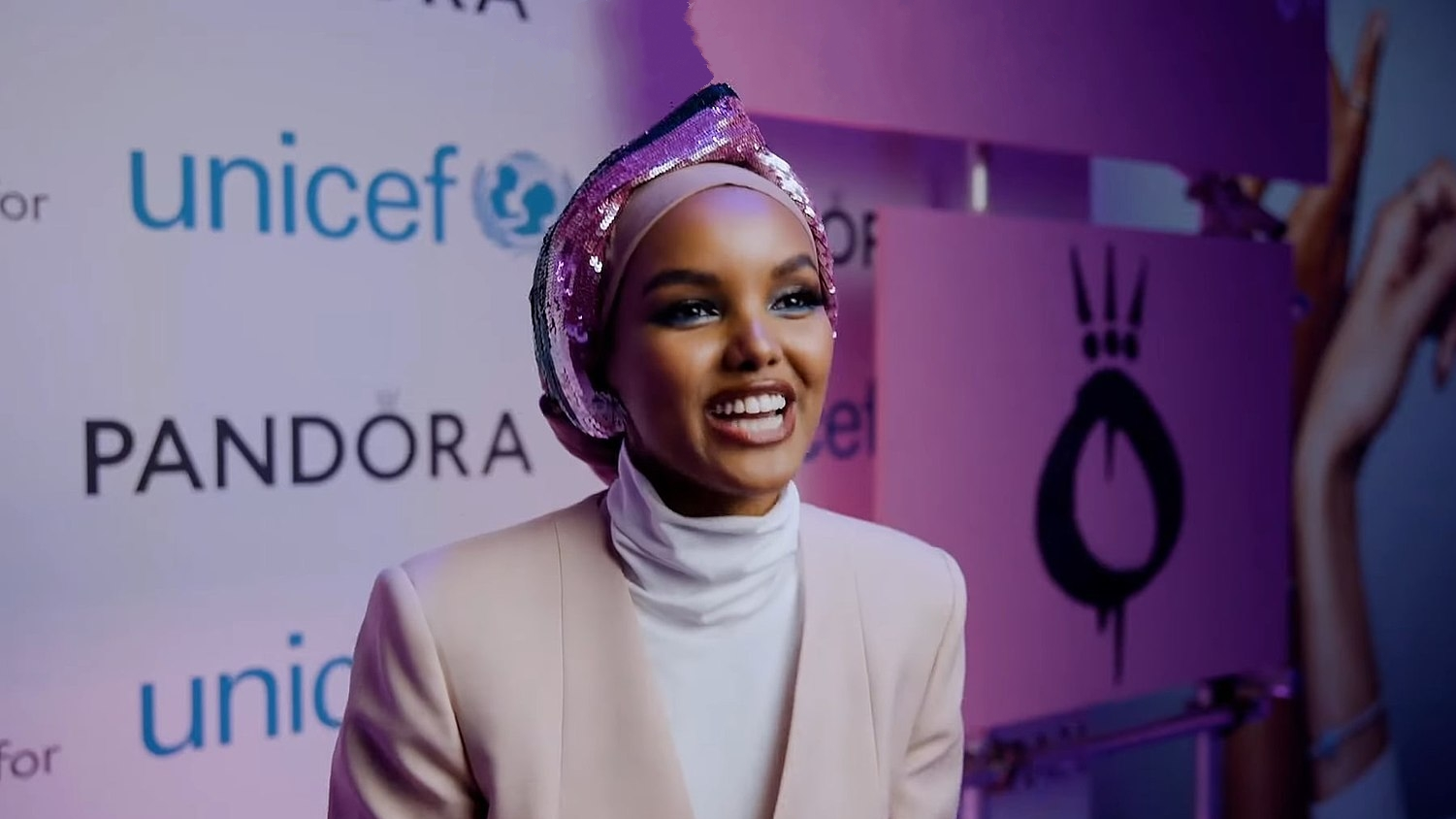
- Aden at UNICEF on International Women’s Day, 2020
- Born: September 19, 1997 (age 29); Kakuma, Kenya
- Education: St. Cloud State University
- Occupation: Model
- Years active: 2016–present
- Modeling information
- Height: 5 ft 5 in (1.65 m)
- Eye color: Dark brown
- Agency: IMG Models (New York, Paris, Milan, London)

Halima Aden (Somali: Xaliima Aaden; born September 19, 1997) is an American fashion model. She is noted for being the first woman to wear a hijab in the Miss Minnesota USA 2016 pageant, where she was a semi-finalist. Following her participation in the pageant, Halima received national attention and was signed to IMG Models. She was also the first model to wear a hijab and burkini in the Sports Illustrated Swimsuit Issue.

In 2021 she was named as one of the BBC's 100 Women.

== Early life and education ==
Aden was born in the Kakuma refugee camp in Kenya on September 19, 1997 and comes from a Somali family. At the age of six she moved to the United States, settling in St. Cloud, Minnesota. She attended Apollo High School where her classmates voted her as their school homecoming queen. She is a student at St. Cloud State University.

== Career ==
In 2016, Aden received national media attention after competing in the Miss Minnesota USA pageant, she becoming the first contestant in the pageant to wear a burkini and a hijab. Some analysts saw this as a move towards diversification in the modeling industry.

The following year, Aden signed a three-year contract with renewal with IMG Models. In February 2017, she made her debut at the New York Fashion Week for Yeezy Season 5. She later served as a preliminary and telecast judge of the Miss USA 2017 pageant.

She has since walked for numerous designers, including Maxmara and Alberta Ferretti. She has also participated in the 2016 Milan Fashion Week and London Modest Fashion Week. Aden posed for American Eagle and British Glamour, and has a CR Fashion Book cover.

Aden was the first hijab-wearing model to walk international runways and to be signed to a major agency. In June 2017, she became the first hijab-wearing model on the cover of Vogue Arabia, Allure, and British Vogue.

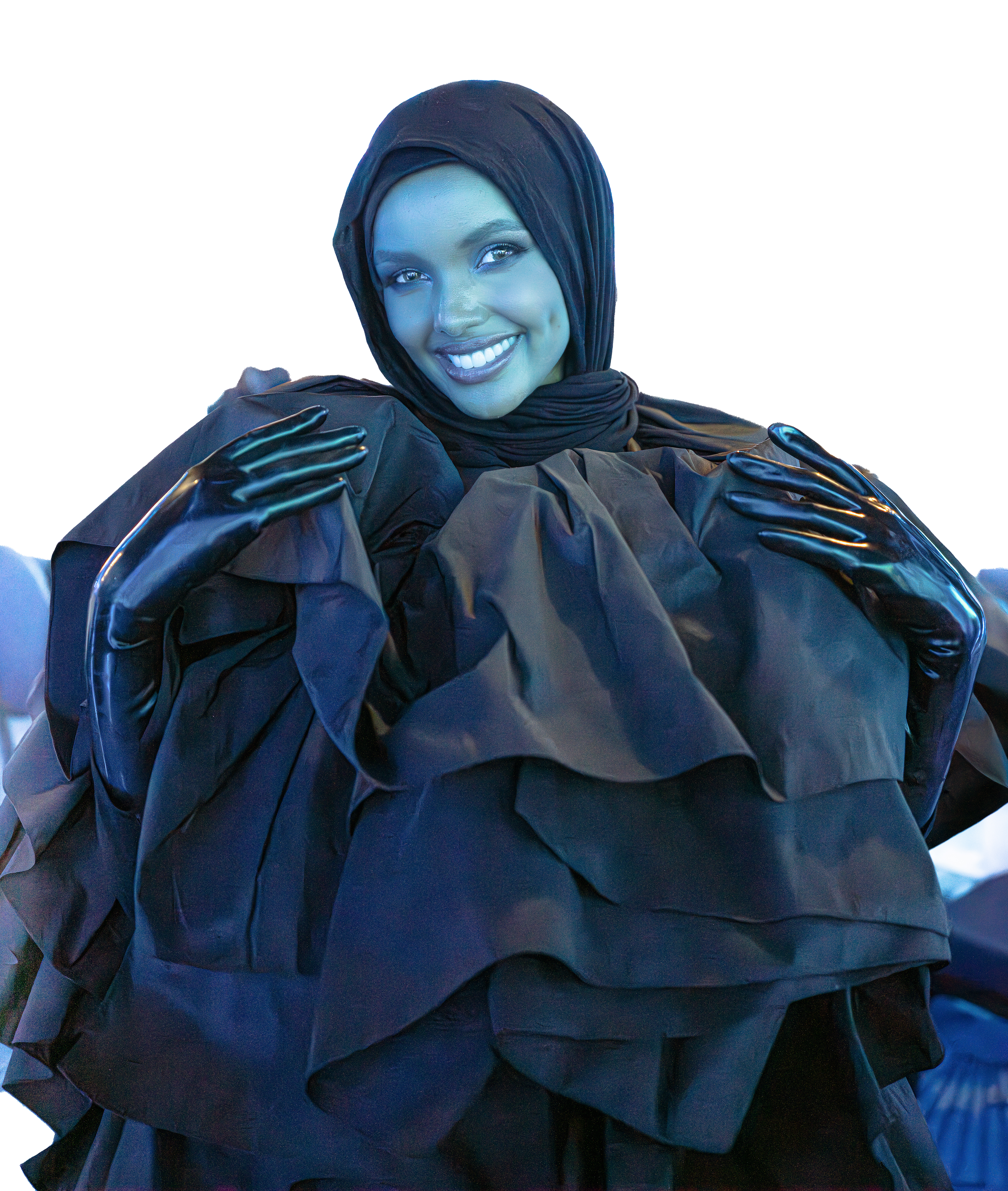
Aden at the Cannes Film Festival, 2023

In 2018, Aden became a UNICEF ambassador. Her work is focused around children's rights.

In May 2019, Aden became the first model to wear the hijab and burkini in Sports Illustrated Swimsuit.

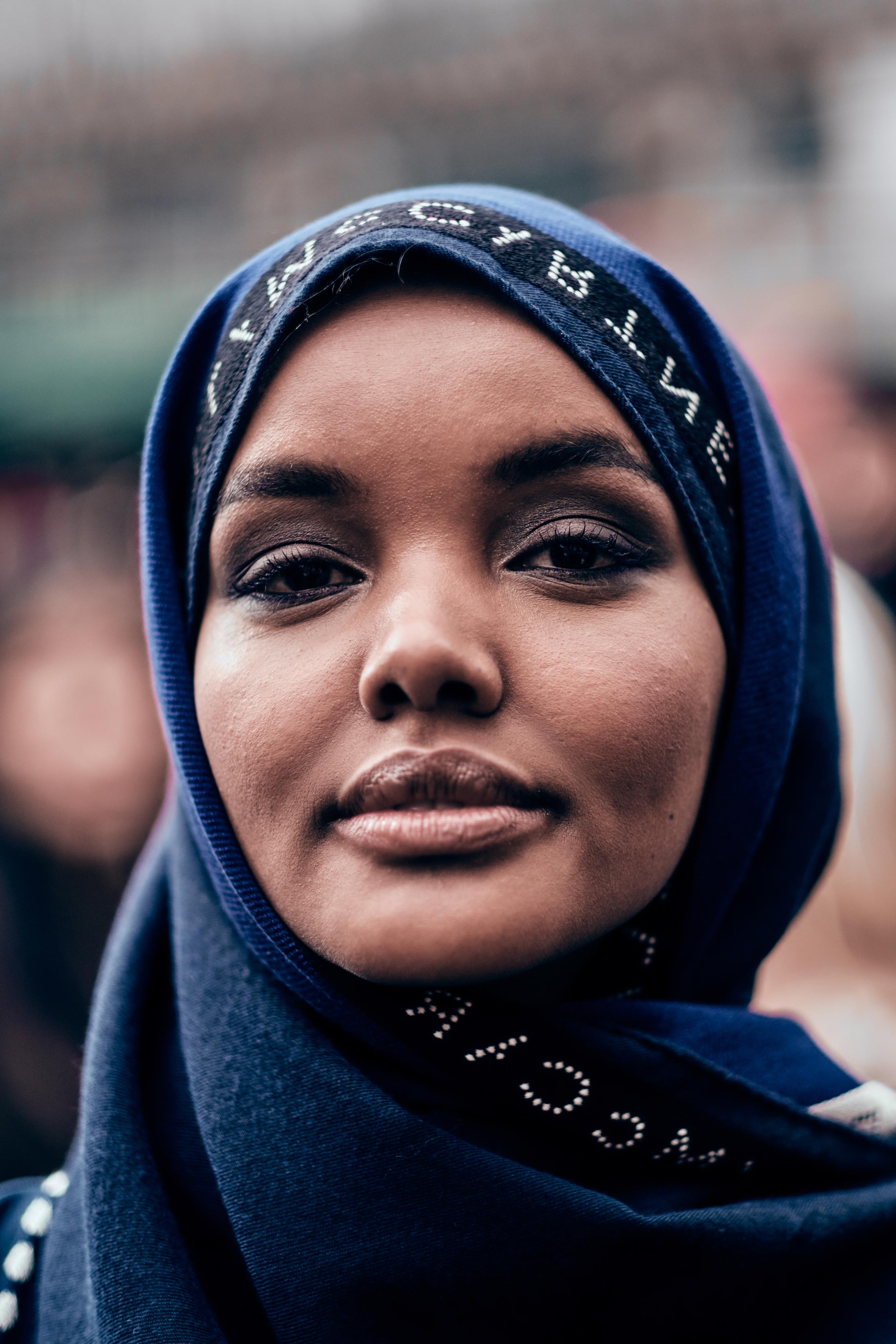
At Paris Fashion Week 2019

This was not the first time in her career that she broke boundaries, further diversifying the industry to be more inclusive of Muslims. Aden stated on her Instagram that her appearance in Sports Illustrated sends a message to both her community and the world that "women of all different backgrounds, looks, upbringings...can stand together and be celebrated." Halima became the first black woman with hijab to be featured on the cover of Essence magazine, in 2020’s January/ February issue.

In April 2019, Aden collaborated with modest clothing brand Modanisa to design her own turban and shawl collection called Halima x Modanisa. In an interview with Teen Vogue, Aden stated that her collection is for everyone, whether they wear the hijab or not. She released the collection at the Istanbul Modest Fashion Week on April 20, 2019.

In November 2020, Aden announced in a series of Instagram stories that she had quit runway modelling as it compromised her religious beliefs, though since then she has indicated that she would do modelling work as long as she could set the conditions. Aden received support for her decision from Rihanna, Gigi Hadid, and Bella Hadid. Aden later announced that she had planned to become the first Somali woman to compete at Miss Universe.

In December 2021 she was named as one of the BBC's 100 Women.

== Personal choices in modeling ==
Aden’s modelling contract includes her hijab, as she has made it a non-negotiable part of her work.

Aden has spoken out about difficulties she faces in booking modeling jobs that are not accommodating to the fact that she wears the hijab. She described positive experiences as with Maxmara, where looks were specifically designed for her considering her clothing choices. Aden reaffirms that she does not need to conform to society’s standards in order to be a successful model.

On 27 July 2025, Halima announced on Instagram that she would begin donning the niqab and stop posting on social media: "Niqab on. Voice off… This account is now an archive”.
