= Diary of a Bad Man =

British comedy drama web series

- A screenshot from the opening title sequence
- Also known as: DOABM
- Genre: Comedy drama
- Created by: Humza Arshad
- Written by: Humza Arshad
- Directed by: Bombay Spice
- Starring: Humza Arshad; Mohammed Umar Baig; Asif Hussain; Jaspal Kerrah; Yogesh Kalia; Jazzie Zonzolo
- Narrated by: Humza Arshad
- Opening theme: "Three Pointer"
- Country of origin: United Kingdom
- Original languages: English, Punjabi, Urdu
- No. of seasons: 2
- No. of episodes: 16 (list of episodes)

Production
- Producer: Humza Arshad
- Production locations: South London, United Kingdom
- Editor: Humza Arshad
- Camera setup: Single-camera setup
- Running time: 10–30 minutes
- Production company: Humza Productions

Original release
- Network: YouTube
- Release: 6 September 2010 – 10 October 2013

Related
- Smokey Barbers; Badman; Badman's Britain; Britain Bubblegum; Black and Brown; Badman Blogs; Badman's World "Coconut"

Diary of a Bad Man (often abbreviated as DOABM) is a British comedy drama web series that premiered on 6 September 2010 and ended on 10 October 2013. The series was created by Humza Arshad and consists of continuous episodes uploaded on his YouTube channel HumzaProductions, revolving around the life of a young man and his relationships with his friends and family.

In 2011, the fifth episode was the seventh most viewed video on YouTube in the UK. As of 2012, HumzaProductions had exceeded over 40 million views.

== Premise ==
The name draws itself from Nikolai Gogol's short story Diary of a Madman. The series follows a fictionalised portrayal of Arshad consisting of video diaries chronicling the life of a self-styled "Badman with seriously good looks" as an exaggerated stereotype of an Asian youth in contemporary society, who is also a "troubled young man with the mentality of a seven-year-old... whose adventures don't shy away from controversy".

Arshad's webcam monologues and sketches focus on topics such as impressing girls, arranged marriage, racism, attitudes towards women, his relationship with his parents, and his extended family and friends.

Badman is a dim-witted, stereotypical young man who does wrong, makes mistakes, has no respect for anyone and gets into trouble. However, as each episode unfolds he slowly starts to learn from his experiences and improve on his flaws and character.

The episodes are predominantly in English, but Arshad also uses Punjabi and Urdu phrases.

== Production ==
The series is written, directed, edited and produced by Arshad. The supporting cast features his friends and occasional celebrity guests. The episodes are shot in and around South London, filmed using a Sony Handycam HDR-SR12 and edited using Apple’s iMovie. The series theme tune is "Three Pointer" from the iMovie Music Directory.

The advert for season two featured guest appearances from Richard Blackwood and Muhammad Shahid Nazir (One Pound Fish Man). The scenes in Arshad's father's shop Bubblegum Children's Wear are filmed in Thornton Heath, Croydon.

== Episodes ==
=== Series overview ===
Season	Episodes	Originally released	
Season	Episodes	Season premiere	Season finale
1	10	6 September 2010	27 January 2012
2	6	30 June 2012	10 October 2013

=== Season 1 (2010–2012) ===
No. overall	No. in season	Title	Length (minutes)	Original release date
1	1	"Part 1"	9:12	6 September 2010
2	2	"Part 2"	11:33	4 November 2010
3	3	"Part 3"	14:06	5 December 2010
4	4	"Part 4"	14:15	31 December 2010
5	5	"Part 5"	14:59	13 February 2011
6	6	"Part 6"	16:00	1 April 2011
7	7	"Part 7"	16:11	27 May 2011
8	8	"Part 8"	18:17	31 July 2011
9	9	"Part 9"	20:00	22 October 2011
10	10	"Part 10"	26:30	27 January 2012

=== Season 2 (2012–2013) ===
No. overall	No. in season	Title	Length (minutes)	Original release date
11	1	"2.1"	20:18	30 June 2012
12	2	"2.2"	19:23	1 September 2012
13	3	"2.3"	20:01	19 October 2012
14	4	"2.4"	20:03	1 February 2013
15	5	"2.5"	21:00	15 March 2013
16	6	"2.6"	30:00	10 October 2013

== Reception ==
The Guardian called the series "a satirical take on British Asian culture, with a twist: the videos all end with a moral message." The Huffington Post reported that the series "defy simple labels" and that episodes "begin with a superficial obsession end with a moral lesson."

Arshad has also received criticism for jokes, which have offended Muslims. In the second season, he made an effort to moderate some of the jokes. To avoid offending people he has also neglected much of the Islamic elements, which formed a major part of the first season. Islamic activist Muhammad Abdul Jabbar called the series disrespectful to Islam.

== See also ==
- British Pakistanis
- List of single-camera situation comedies
