= Jeff Mirza =

English comedian and actor

- Born: Jeffrey Mirza; 3 February 1964 (age 62); East London, England

Comedy career
- Years active: 1995–present
- Medium: Stand-up, television, Film
- Genres: Observational comedy, Character comedy
- Subjects: Islamic humour, Stereotypes
- Website: jeffmirza.com

Jeffrey Mirza (born 3 February 1964) is a British stand-up comedian and actor.

== Early life ==
Mirza was born as Jeffrey Mirza and brought up in East End of London, England on 3 February 1964 to Pakistani parents. His family are from the Punjab region of Pakistan and are of Mughal descent. His maternal grandfather was Dr Mirza Taj Baig, a doctor with the rank of Major and one of the first South Asians to be a Commissioned Officer in the British Army. His paternal grandfather (Abdur Rehman Mirza) was a Zaildar (Headman for 40 villages) in the princely state of Jammu and Kashmir before the Partition. His family came from Pakistan and settled in the UK in the early 1950s.

Mirza attended Barking Abbey Comprehensive School. At the age of 12, he was caned (beaten with a stick by a teacher) to punish him for doing an impression of the television character Columbo. At the age of 14, Mirza had his first stint at live comedy when he told anecdotes about his summer holiday trip to Pakistan for assembly at Loxford High School. After graduating from the University of Westminster with a Bachelor in Civil Engineering degree and a master's degree in Engineering, he informally began performing with a comedy groups called The Men from ChaCha. One of their famous sketches was a dance parody of the Chippendales called "The Chappattidales".

== Stand-up career ==
In 1993, Mirza won the Hackney Empire East West Quest and he went solo into stand-up and since then has not looked back. He has written pieces for magazines and is well known on the London comedy circuit. In 1995, he was a finalist in the BBC Open Mic Award for The Stand up Show at the Edinburgh festival. The same year (1995) he co-starred in a full-length show with Scottish Comedian Brian Higgins in a show called 'Haggis & Curry'. Since that initial success he gave up his job as a structural engineer and began work as a full-time stand-up comedian. In the Asian comedy field he has worked with and for the 'One Nation. ..lnnit!' Team based at Watermans in Brentford and has also played all the major comedy clubs and is a regular at Jongleurs Comedy Clubs.

In 2003, he performed his show Walking With Muslims at the Edinburgh Festival Fringe. The show 'Walking with Muslims' coincided with the 2003 Iraq War and gained worldwide acclaim as Jeff Mirza appeared as dictator Saddam Hussein who was on the run at the time. He has played the comedy circuit in London including Jongleurs and The Comedy Store. He has performed all over the world, and is the first British Muslim comedian ever to perform stand-up comedy to sell out shows in Saudi Arabia.

He is regularly involved with interfaith dialogue between different communities and often called in to lighten-up and moderate contentious debates between multi-faith conservatives.

In July 2011, Mirza toured four UK cities in the Peace Youth and Community Trust's (PYCT) first Muslim Comedy Tour, alongside Humza Arshad, Prince Abdi and Nabil Abdul Rashid. From June to 28 August 2011, he presented a series of eight programmes in the world's first interfaith game show called Faith Off on the Islam Channel at the Edinburgh Festival Fringe in Underbelly, Cowgate, Edinburgh. He also performed his show Jihad: Heresy Or Hearsay. He has also appeared at the Leicester Comedy Festival and Glastonbury Festival.

Mirza is now developing a television sitcom and writing new material for a world tour.

== Acting career ==
Mirza's film credits include "What's Love Got to do with it", Blinded by the Light, Mogul Mowgli, It Was an Accident and Desi Boyz.

His television appearances include White Teeth, Chuckle Vision, Murder in Mind and Doctors.

== Awards and recognition ==
In 1995, reached the finals off the BBC Open Mic Award.

In 2001, Mirza won the "Best Comedian" award in the BT Ethnic Multicultural Media Academy Awards. In 2003, he won the Ethnic Multicultural Media Academy Comedy award which was held at London's Dorchester Hotel where the chief guest was Sir Richard Attenborough. The other nominees were Richard Blackwood, Felix Dexter and Gina Yashere. In 2018 Jeff Mirza was Awarded a BEFFTA Legends Award.

== Personal life ==
Mirza is a West Ham United football fan. He is married and has children.

== Filmography ==
=== Television ===
Year	Title	Role	Notes
2000	Big Kids	Doctor	1 episode: "Finding Hypnotist"
2001	Judge John Deed	Dr. Wahid	1 episode: "Hidden Agenda"
2002	The Bill	Shop Manager	1 episode: "Shop Manager"
2002	My Hero	Pilot	1 episode: "Zero Tolerance"
2002	White Teeth	Mo	4 episodes: "The Return of Magid Iqbal", "The Trouble with Millat", "The Temptation of Samad Iqbal", "The Peculiar Second Marriage of Archie Jones"
2003	Murder in Mind	Manji Patel	1 episode: "Cornershop"
2004	Top Buzzer	Ali / Jaffi	1 episode: "Lee's Dinner"
2004	Dirty War	Asian Landlord	TV film
2005	Trial & Retribution	Juror	1 episode: "The Lovers: Part 2"
2006	ChuckleVision	Demolition Foreman	1 episode: "Off the Cuff"
2007	A Class Apart	Shopkeeper	TV film
2008	Doctors	Jaswad Mukherjee	1 episode: "Making a Splash"
2009	Coming Up	The Newsagent	1 episode: "Adha Cup"
2011	Doctors	Jaswad Mukherjee	1 episode: "Unkindness of Strangers"
2012	Parents	Shop Assistant	2 episodes: "#1.5", "#1.3"
2015	Cucumber	Mr. Bhose	1 episode: "#1.2"
2015	Moone Boy	Gundeep	1 episode: "Bells 'n' Smells"
2016	Plebs	Tanjit	1 episode: "The Weatherist"
2016	Fleabag	Shop Owner	1 episode: "#1.2"
2016	People Just Do Nothing	Check-out assistant	1 episode: "Ipswich"
2019	The Cockfields	Andre	3 episodes
2022	The Good Karma Hospital	Amir Khan	1 episode
2023–present	Juice	Saif	6 episodes
2024	True Detective	Veer Mehta	

=== Film ===
Year	Title	Role	Notes
2000	It Was an Accident	Tariq	
2004	Ne quittez pas!	Le chauffeur de taxi londonien	
2005	The League of Gentlemen's Apocalypse	Asian Dad	
2006	Infinite Justice	Inspector Akhtar	
2006	Bigga Than Ben	Dennis	
2009	Mad Sad and Bad	Dillip	
2011	Swinging with the Finkels	Indian Man	
2011	Desi Boyz	Shop owner	
2012	Seven Lucky Gods	Passport Counterfeiter	
2013	Hummingbird	Asian shopkeeper	
2013	Der Koch	Mahit	
2017	Arifa	Hameed	
2019	Blinded by the Light	Mr Shah	
2020	Mogul Mowgli	Ghulab Mian/Toba Tek Singh	
2021	Eternals	Gupta Hindu Priest	
2022	What's Love Got to Do with It?	Zahid Khan	
2023	Polite Society	Raff	
2023	Sky Peals	Hassan	

== See also ==
- Islamic humour
- British Pakistanis
- List of British Pakistanis
