= Humza Arshad =

British actor and comedian (born 1985)

Humza Arshad MBE
- حمزه محمد ارشد
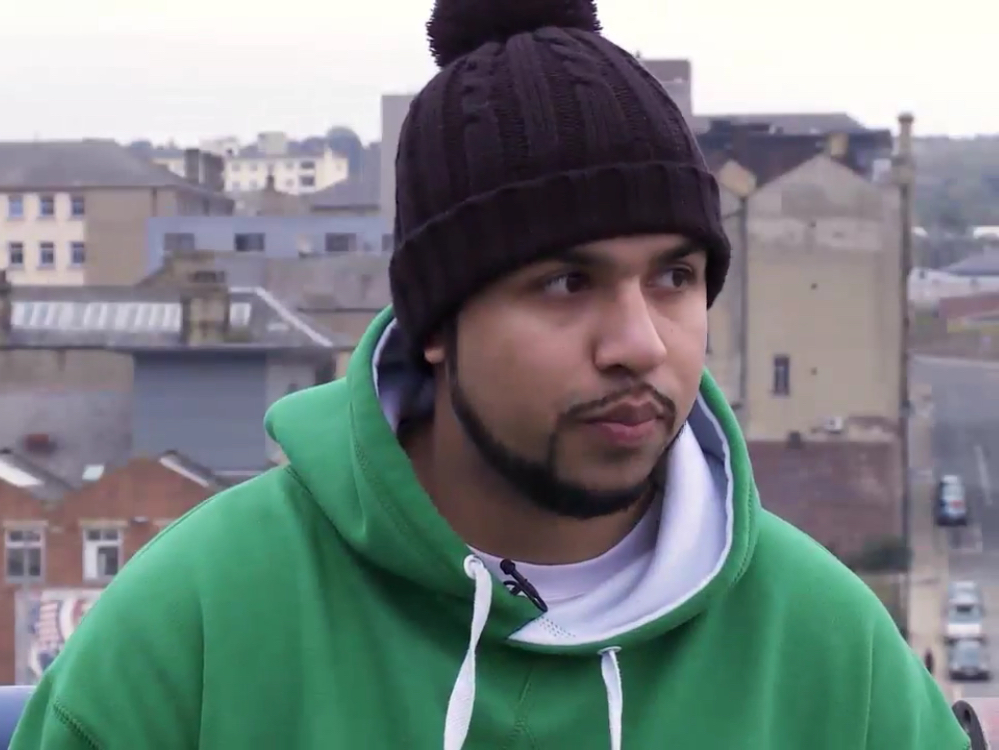
- Arshad in 2011
- Born: Humza Mohammed Arshad; 3 June 1985 (age 41); Streatham, London, England
- Notable work: Diary of a Bad Man, Badman

Comedy career
- Years active: 2009–present
- Medium: Web series; video blog; stand-up
- Genres: Sketch comedy; documentary; observational comedy; character comedy; musical comedy; improvisational comedy; self-deprecation
- Subjects: Pakistani culture; Islamic humour

YouTube information
- Channel: Humza Productions
- Years active: 2009–present
- Subscribers: 482 thousand
- Views: 118 million
- Last updated: 23 March 2026

Humza Mohammed Arshad MBE (Punjabi: حمزه محمد ارشد; born 3 June 1985) is an English actor, comedian and writer of Pakistani descent. He produces the web series Diary of a Bad Man (2010–2013) and Badman (2015–present). His homemade YouTube videos have been viewed more than 100 million times, which makes him one of the most popular online comedians in the UK.

== Early life ==
Arshad was born on 3 June 1985 to a Punjabi Muslim family in the Streatham district of London, England. His parents were born in Pakistan. His father, Mohammad Arshad, is from Jhelum, Punjab, Pakistan, and his mother, Noreen Arshad, is from Lahore, Punjab, Pakistan. He has two siblings; a younger sister, Hanna, and a younger brother, Hasan.

Arshad studied GNVQ in Performing Arts at Croydon College and BTEC National Diploma in Performing Arts at Kingston College. He then graduated from Richmond Drama School with a degree in drama. He had a part-time job as an Asian wedding hall waiter.

== Career ==
In September 2010, Arshad created comedy web series Diary of a Bad Man, revolving around video diaries of a young man with the "mentality of a seven-year-old". In 2011, the fifth episode of Diary of a Bad Man was the seventh most viewed video on YouTube in the UK.

In December 2010, Arshad was interviewed by Waqas Saeed on BBC Asian Network. In March and December 2011, he featured on BBC Asian Network's Noreen Khan Drive Time Show. In July 2011, Arshad performed on Meera Syal's Comedy Night on BBC Asian Network. In July 2011, he was interviewed by Bobby Friction on BBC Asian Network's Bobby Friction's late night show. In July and August 2011, he featured and reported for BBC London News. In November 2011, he featured on Nihal's phone-in show on BBC Asian Network.

In July 2011, Arshad toured four UK cities in the Peace Youth and Community Trust's (PYCT) first Muslim Comedy Tour, alongside Jeff Mirza, Prince Abdi and Nabil Abdul Rashid.

From November to December 2011, he toured eight UK cities, performing at nine venues, with his comedy show called The Badman Comedy Tour 2011, he was accompanied by his entourage; Asif Hussain, Jaspal Kerrah, Junaid Malik, Yogesh Kalia, and Fayaaz Kassam. The tour was sponsored by Azme Alishan, a Pakistan-based social movement.

In May 2013, Arshad performed stand-up at the Shaw Theatre in London. On 9 and 10 July 2013, he was involved in a live shows of Smokey's Barbers at the Pavilion Theatre, Festival Square for the Manchester International Festival. In the same month, he was interviewed by Tommy Sandhu on BBC Asian Network. From 11 to 25 August 2013, he performed 15 stand-up shows at the Edinburgh Festival Fringe.

In March 2015, Arshad appeared at the Muslim Youth Festival, a festival on how to divert young Britons away from extremism and looking at what it means to be a young British Muslim in the UK today.

=== Published works ===
In 2018 Penguin Random House bought the children's novel series Little Badman, created by Arshad and comedy writer Henry White. The first in the series is titled Little Badman and the Invasion of the Killer Aunties and was published on World Book Day in March 2019. The second book, Little Badman and the Time-travelling Teacher of Doom, was published on 20 August 2020. The third book, Little Badman and the Radioactive Samosa, was published for World Book Day in March 2021. The fourth book, Little Badman and the Rise of the Punjabi Zombies was published on 7 July 2022. The books are illustrated by Aleksei Bitskoff.

Little Badman follows the story of 11 year old rapper Humza Khan who becomes suspicious when his school teachers begin to disappear and are replaced by evil aunties.

== Honours, awards and recognition ==
On 28 March 2011, Arshad was nominated in the categories for comedy and entertainment at the third annual Shorty Awards for social media at The Times Center, New York City. In 2012, he was nominated for in the category of YouTube star at the fourth annual Shorty Awards.

Arshad was appointed Member of the Order of the British Empire (MBE) in the 2021 New Year Honours for services to education.

== Personal life ==
In June and July 2011, arranged by the Metropolitan Police, Arshad visited schools with Jaspal Kerrah and Junaid Malik to give presentations to students, discussing topics and issues encountered by teenagers living in London.

In October 2014, Arshad was recruited by East Midlands Police to help prevent the radicalisation of British Muslims by holding workshops at schools in the area. He made a 15-minute film "Think for Yourself" to show teenagers the dangers of exposure to extremist messages. In 2015, Arshad and the Metropolitan Police Service toured around 50 schools, doing shows for students holding anti-extremism discussions and workshops for 11 to 18-year-old students in order to help prevent vulnerable students becoming radicalised at schools and colleges across London. Arshad is working in partnership with Scotland Yard to aid in their campaign to counter violent Islamist extremism within high school students in London.

== Videography ==
Year	Title	Role	Season	Episodes
2009	Chronicles of Tuttoo	Tuttoo, Rupert Salami	Season 1	5 episodes
2010–2012	Diary of a Bad Man	Badman	Season 1	10 episodes
2012–2013	Smokey's Barbers	Badman	Season 1	6 episodes
2012–2013	Diary of a Bad Man	Badman, Mr Bubblegum	Season 2	6 episodes
2012–2013	Badman's Britain	Badman	Season 1	2 episodes
2013	Yard Party	Various	Season 1	1 episode
2014–2015	Bubblegum	Himself, Mr Bubblegum, Rupert Salami	Season 1	10 episodes
2014	Black and Brown	Badman	Season 1	5 episodes
2014	Badman Blogs	Badman	Season 1	2 episodes
2014	Variety Show	Himself	Season 1	1 episode
2014–2015	Badman's World	Badman, Mr Bubblegum, Rupert Salami	Season 1	20 episodes
2015–	Badman	Badman, Mr Bubblegum	Season 1	13 episodes
2016	The T-Boy Show	Maz	Season 2	15 episodes
2016	Stupid Man, Smart Phone	Himself	Season 1	1 episode
2016	2 Man 1 Show	Himself	Season 1	5 episodes
2016–2021	DOABM Shorts	Badman	Season 1	50 episodes
2017	Coconut	Ahmed Armstrong	Season 1	10 episodes
2017	Romesh: Talking to Comedians	Himself	Season 1	1 episode
2018	Wild Wild Web	Himself	Season 1	10 episodes
2019	Corner Shop Show	Himself	Season 1	1 episode
2021	The Chewing Gums	Badman, Mr Bubblegum	Season 1	11 episodes
2023	Humza: Forgiving the Unforgivable	Himself	Season 1	1 episode

== See also ==
- British Pakistanis
- List of British Pakistanis
