= Salma Abu Deif =

Egyptian Actress and Model

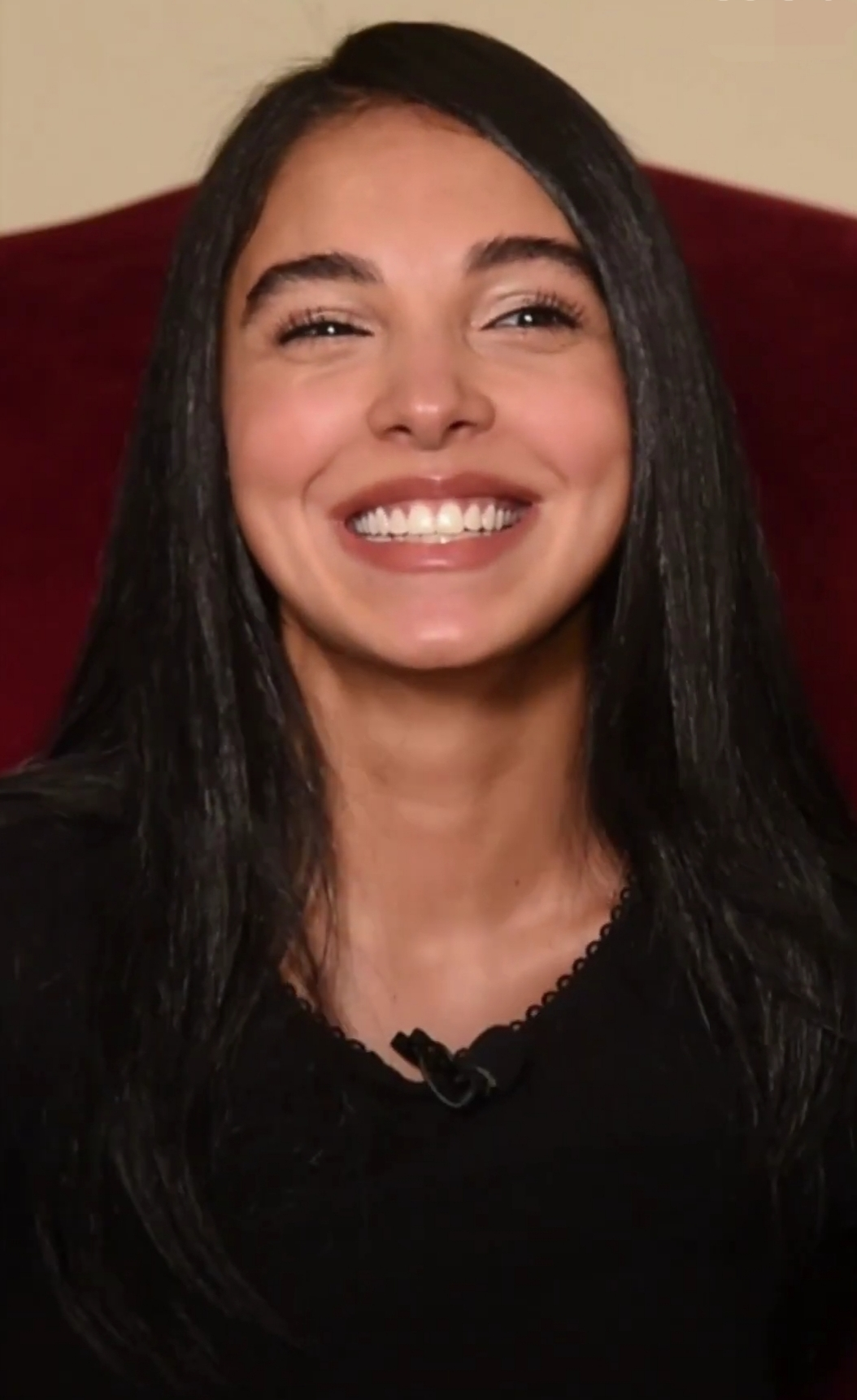
- Abu Deif in October 2022
- Born: February 2, 1993 (age 33); Cairo, Egypt
- Occupations: Actress, Fashion Model

Salma Abu Deif (Arabic: سلمى أبو ضيف) is an Egyptian actress and fashion model.

== Biography ==
Salma Abu Deif was born on February 2, 1993, in Cairo, Egypt. She started her career at the age of 16, where she worked as a radio announcer on Rehab FM. She received a bachelor's degree in Mass Communication from Misr International University. In 2017, she had her acting debut in Halawt Al Dunia and La Tutafi’ Alshams TV dramas. In the same year, she had her debut cinematic role in Sheikh Jackson, that was premiered at the 42nd Toronto International Film Festival and was Egypt's official submission to the Academy Awards for Best Foreign-Language Film 2018.

Following her passion in the fashion industry, Salma Abu Deif became the face of Maison Valentino as an actress in the Middle East in 2020. In 2023, she collaborated for a second time with the Maison Valentino.

In 2022, Salma Abu Deif launched her new brand ELMA, a women's swimwear brand.

== Filmography ==
=== TV Dramas ===
- 2026: بنج كلي
- 2024: Aala Nesbet Moshahda
- 2022: Mon’ataf Khatar
- 2022: The Choice 3: The Decision
- 2022: Suits in Arabic
- 2022: Rageen Ya Hawa
- 2021: The Last Scene
- 2020: Ela Ana
- 2019: Hadouta Morra
- 2018: Zeinhom
- 2018: Tela'at Rohy
- 2018: Ladina Aqwal Okhra
- 2017: Halawt Al Dunia
- 2017: La Tutafi’ Alshams

=== Films ===
- 2017: Sheikh Jackson
