= Yasmine Sabri =

Egyptian actress

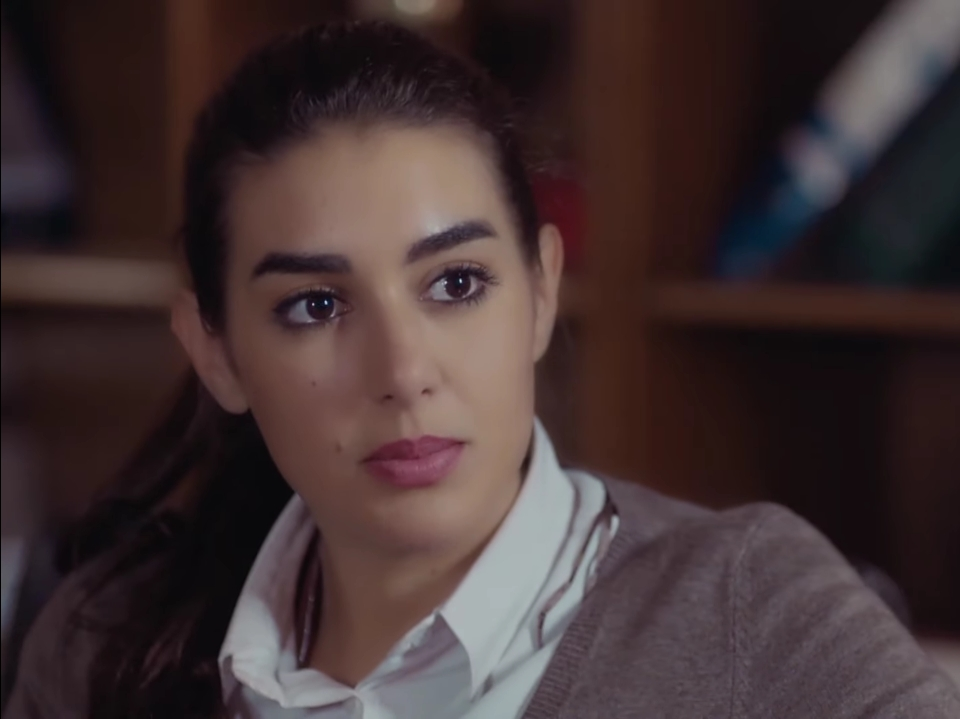
- Yasmine Sabri in Chess, a TV series in 2015
- Born: Yasmine Ashraf Sabri; January 21, 1988 (age 38); Alexandria, Egypt
- Occupations: Actress, Model
- Years active: 2013–present

Yasmine Ashraf Sabri (Arabic: ياسمين أشرف صبري; born 21 January 1988) is an Egyptian actress and model.

== Early life ==
Yasmine Sabri was born and raised in Alexandria. Her father, Ashraf Sabri, works as a Businessman, while her mother is a swimmer. Her parents divorced later and Yasmine Sabri claimed in an interview that she was only raised by her mother and grandmother and that she has not seen her father since she was two years old, "There is no relationship between me and my father, but the separation is not a reason because people make choices in their life, and there are people who choose to take responsibility and complement the other, and other people choose themselves" she said. Sabri's father then published a set of photos of him with his daughter during her first engagement party, adding "After I heard the lies of my daughter who I raised in my house, and she was the owner of the house and she had a job... and she was able to stab her father in the back," and that "family friends used to come to the house and see her staying there, and after she grew up I bought her a car."

== Career ==
Following her debut in the television industry in 2013, Yasmine Sabri played several supporting roles. She made her film debut with Hell in India in 2016.

Between 2015 and 2017, Yasmine Sabri established herself as a sought-after actress in Egypt, appearing in several successful television series. These included Tariqi (My Path), alongside Sherine Abdel Wahab, and Al-Ostoora (The Legend), in which she portrayed a strong and independent woman. Her role in Al-Ostoora further strengthened her status as a rising figure in Egyptian television and cinema.

In 2018, she starred in two commercially successful films, Leilat Hana wa Surour (transl. "The Night of Hana and Surour") and El Diesel. In El Diesel, she played the role of Donia El-Sayyad, a popular actress alongside Mohamed Ramadan. The film was a major success at the box office, further proving her capability to lead major productions. Her growing popularity and talent led to more film offers, solidifying her as a leading actress in the region.

In 2019, Yasmine Sabri made her first television starring with Hekayti (transl. "My Story"), the following year, she starred in Forsa Tanya (transl. "Second Chance").

In April 2019, Yasmine Sabri was named Ambassador of African Women during the Arab African Conference on Women's Empowerment in the presence of ministers and dignitaries from across the Arab region and the African continent. In January 2020, Yasmine Sabri become the first Arab woman to star in Cartier's campaign for the Panthere De Cartier collection, she was featured alongside Italian model Mariacarla Boscono and British actresses Ella Balinska and Annabelle Wallis.

In 2025, Yasmine was the main female lead role in the movie Project X which cast Karim Abdel Aziz as the main male role. The movie gained tremendous success with impressive box office. Project X topped the Egyptian box office on the eve of Eid al-Adha, earning LE2.114 million from 14,880 tickets in a single day. After 16 nights, the film had accumulated LE52.2 million from 368,000 tickets. The film was also described as one of the most ambitious productions in Egyptian and Arab cinema.

== Personal life ==
Yasmine Sabri was married prior to her career in 2012. She revealed her marriage to the public for the first time in 2015. Then, in 2017, she stated on a television program that her husband's name is Muhammad, they separated later after five years of marriage.

In April 2020, Yasmine Sabri married Egyptian businessman Ahmed Abu Hashima in a wedding ceremony with the presence of relatives only due to the COVID-19 epidemic.

At the 2020 El Gouna Film Festival, Yasmine Sabri received backlash for her comments on the COVID-19 when she was asked about the pandemic by a reporter, "No, I am not obsessed with fear. I go on with my life," she said "Isn't there a possibility that we were infected with the virus and now it's gone? It's common sense, it's going to infect the whole world," she then said "Whoever gets it, gets it, and who moves on, moves, and survival is for the strongest."

In May 2022, she divorced after 2 years of marriage.

In 2022, Yasmine Sabri stated that she grew up as a poor child and studied in a public school in Alexandria, which was denied by her father, who took to his Facebook account and denied her allegation, revealing that Yasmine Sabri was a spoiled girl and said that the actress went to one of the highest elite schools in Alexandria with a wardrobe full of clothes from Paris. Yasmine Sabri is currently turning a blind eye to all of this.

== Filmography ==
=== Films ===
Year	Film	Role
2016	Hell in India	Dina
2018	Happiness and bliss night	Hana
2018	The Dezel	Dunia
2023	El Boaboa	Salma
2023	Abu Nasab	Dalia
2025	Project X	Mariam
2026	Matloub Aaeleyan	Mai

=== TV series ===
Year	Name	Role
2013	Satan Steps	Rasha
2014	Halal Mountain	Safi
2015	Chess	Sarah
2015	My Way	Nadia
2015	Going and back	
2015	Teen Wolf	Elena Ibrahim
2015	Ostriches Land	
2015	Secrets	
2016	The Legend	Tamara
2017	The Black Horse	Hasnaa
2019	My Story	Dalida
2020	Second Chance	Malak
