= Rohina Malik =

American dramatist

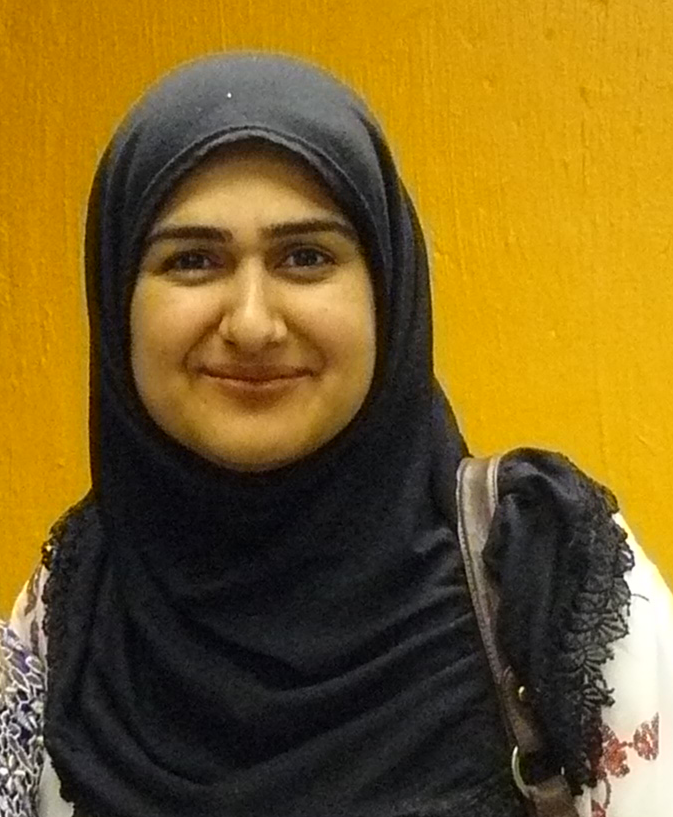
- Photograph of Rohina Malik after her play Unveiled in Berwyn, IL
- Born: London, England
- Occupations: Playwright, Solo Performer, Educator
- Writing career
- Period: 2008-present
- Notable works: Unveiled, Yasmina's Necklace, The Mecca Tales

Rohina Malik is a British-born American playwright, actress, speaker, story teller and educator of South Asian descent. She is also the artistic director for Medina Theater Collective.

== Biography ==
She was born and raised in London, England, where she showed great interest in theatre and drama. Her father is Pakistani while her mother is Indian. She attended Brentford School for Girls in Hounslow, London where her interest in theater was developed. At the age of 15, she migrated to Chicago with her family and attended Niles North High School in Skokie, Illinois, where she wrote and performed in several theatrical plays.

She went to DePaul University completing a degree in Bachelor of Arts in Comparative Religions and is a certified Montessori teacher.

Her career in playwrighting and performance arts started in 2008 after taking a class on writing a one-person play with Tekki Lominicki in April 2008. During the same class, she started writing her much-acclaimed play Unveiled. She was offered at the end of the class to perform a sample of her play in the Fillet of Solo Festival at Live Bait Theater in July 2008. The next year, Unveiled had its world premiere at the 16th Street Theater, directed by Ann Filmer. Malik was offered a one-year residency at The Goodman Theater, in the inaugural group of The Goodman's Playwrights Unit.

Since 2010, Malik regularly performs her play Unveiled in universities, churches, synagogues, interfaith and other places of worship to open up discussion about hate crimes, identity, tolerance and discrimination.

She has also participated as a keynote speaker at several conferences throughout North America including at a TedX and CueBall event.

== Full productions ==
Unveiled

- June 2019 - Regional Premiere performed at Watch Tower Theater Addison TX
- February 2018 - "Unveiled" performed at Greater Boston Stage Company
- January 2018 - "Unveiled" Performed at New Repertory Theatre as part of 2017-18 Season
- June/July 2016 - South Africa Premiere of "Unveiled" "" at 2016 National Arts Festival, Grahamstone & "" 969 Festival, Johannesburg performed by Gulshan Mia
- June 2015 - New York Premiere of "Unveiled" at Voyage Theater Company
- September 2014 - "Unveiled" performed at Edison Theatre as part of the Ovations Series
- April 2013 - "Unveiled" performed at Crossroads Theater Company, NJ
- 2012 - Theater Project Baltimore
- Sept 2011 - Fourth Production of "Unveiled" at Brava Theater, San Francisco, CA
- 2010 - Third Production of "Unveiled" at Next Theater Company in Evanston, IL
- March 2010 - Chicago Premiere of "Unveiled" at Victory Gardens Theater
- May/June 2009 - "Unveiled" was extended for an additional month at 16th Street Theater in Berwyn, IL
- April/May 2009 – World Premiere of "Unveiled" at 16th Street Theater in Berwyn, IL

Yasmina's Necklace

- September 2019 - New Jersey Premiere "Yasmina's Necklace" at Premiere Stages at Bauer Boucher Theatre Center
- October 2017 - Chicago Premiere of "Yasmina's Necklace" at Goodman Theater (October/November 2017)
- January 2017 - St. Louis Premiere of "Yasmina's Necklace" at Mustard Seed Theater Jan/Feb 2017
- January 2016 - World Premiere of "Yasmina's Necklace" at 16th Street Theater in Berwyn, IL

The Mecca Tales

- November 2017 - "Mecca Tales" at Crossroads Theater, NJ
- October 2017 - "Mecca Tales" at Voyage Theater, New York
- October 2014 - Chicago Dramatists announces the World Premiere of "The Mecca Tales" in March/April 2015

The Hijabis

April 2022 - Hope College

March 2022 - “The Hijabis” at George Fox University, Oregon

February 2022 - World Premiere of “The Hijabis” at Carroll College, Montana

== Nomination and awards ==
- February 2019 - Unveiled - IRNE Award Nominee - Best Solo Performance
- March 2018 - 2018 Theatre Women Awards - Lee Reynolds Award
- November 2017 - Yasmina's Necklace (Chicago edition) - Jeff Recommended
- August 2016 - Yasmina's Necklace (World Premiere) 2016 Equity Jeff Award Nominee For New Work
- August 2015 - The Mecca Tales 2015 Equity Jeff Award Nominee For New Work
- October 2013 – 2013 YWomen Leadership Award – Woman of Promise
- August 2011 – Nominated for 3 Arts Artist Award in playwrighting

== Career highlights ==
- July 2019 - Commissioned by Big Bridge Theatre Consortium (BBTC) to be produced in 2021-22
- December 2018 - Speaker at a Ted X Chicago event, "Power of the Pen" Chicago USA
- Spring 2018 - Alice Kaplan Institute for the Humanities Artist in Residence, Northwestern University, USA
- September 2016 - Accepted as an artistic affiliate at American Blues Theater, Chicago IL
- March 2016 - Commissioned by The Hypocrites to develop new play inspired by Syrian musician responses to the refugee crisis.
- September 2011 – 2017 – Accepted as one of the 4 new additions to Chicago Dramatist's resident playwrights
- January 2015 - Accepted as an artistic associate at Voyage Theater Company, New York, NY
- November/December 2011 – Collaborated with Tanya Saracho and Elizabeth Berg in "Our Holiday Stories" which was produced by 16th Street Theater, Berwyn IL
- May 2011 – Playwright Unit Series; "The Mecca Tales", Goodman Theatre commission in Chicago, IL
- 2010/11 – Accepted as one of the four playwrights in the inaugural Playwrights Unit at Goodman Theatre in Chicago, IL
- 2010 – Accepted as an artistic associate at 16th Street Theater, Berwyn IL
- December 2009 – New Stage Series; "Yasmina's Necklace" Goodman Theatre in Chicago, IL
- August 2008 – Workshopped her play "Unveiled" with Rivendale Theatre
- July 2008 – Performed sample of "Unveiled" at the Filet of Solo Festival

== Selected works ==
- The Hijabis (2020)
- Zujaj (Glass) (2016)
- Short Play for After Orlando Project - At the Store with my Daughter (2016)
- The Mecca Tales (2011)
- Yasmina's Necklace (2010)
- Unveiled – One Woman Play about Muslim Women post 9/11 (2009)

== Publications ==
- Yasmina's Necklace - Full-Length Play by Rohina Malik (2018) Published by Dramatic Publishing - ISBN 9781619592070
- Unveiled - One Woman Play about Muslim Women (2013)

== Other activities ==
She was requested to provide video based inspirational reflections for 30 Good Minutes (a weekly multifaith program on WTTW (Channel 11)) PBS in Chicago. Her reflections will be shown throughout 2012 as part of the weekly program.

She has performed her play "Unveiled" at various interfaith events, high schools and universities for example Princeton, Yale, University of Chicago, Brigham Young University, University of Oklahoma, Columbia University, Harvard University, University of Illinois, Stanford University.

She gave the keynote address at Dartmouth College for MLK Event in Jan 2016
