= Rym Breidy =

Tunisian model and actress

Rym Saidi Breidy ريم بريدي
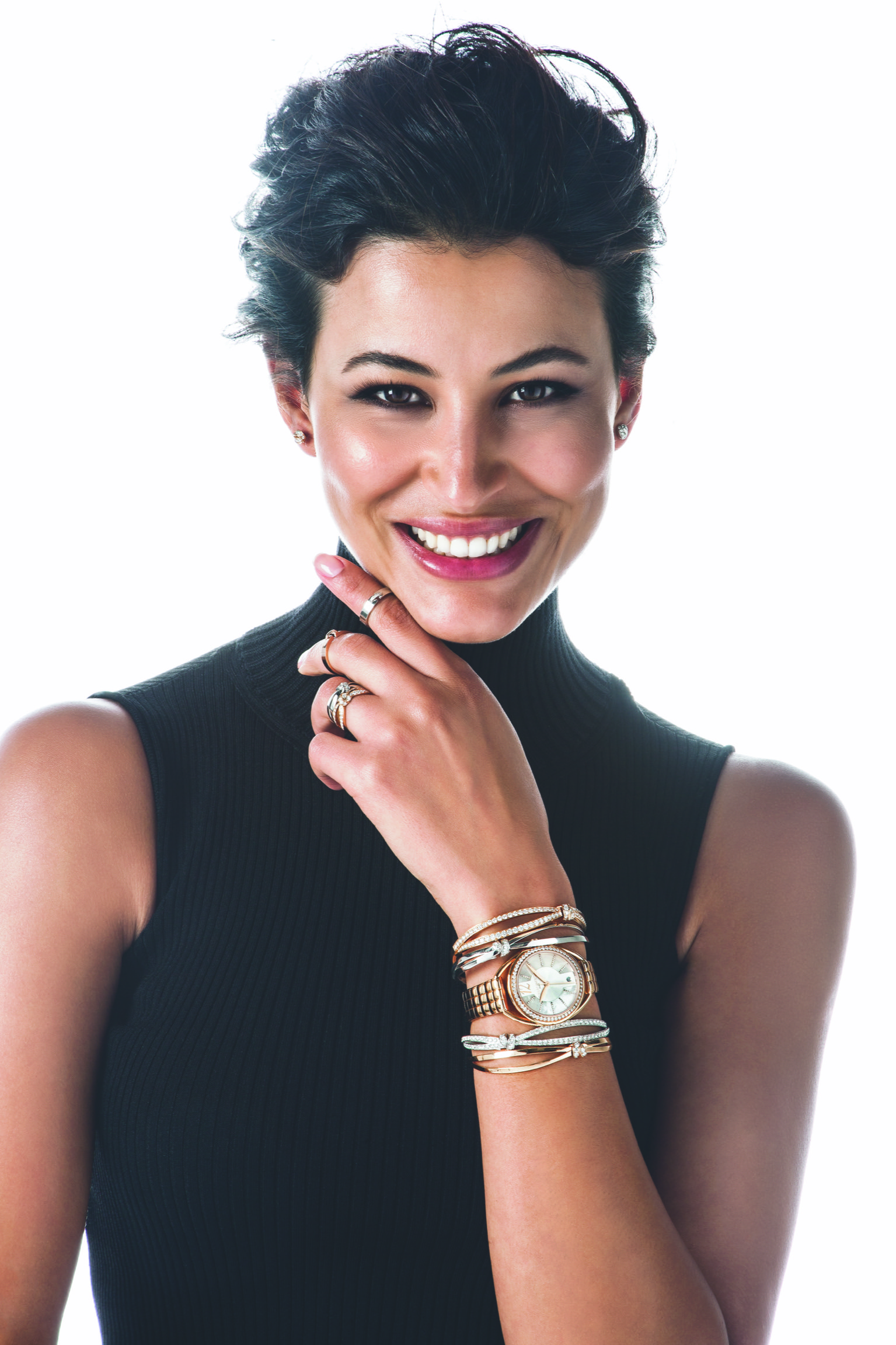
- Rym Saidi in 2017
- Born: RIM Saidi; 21 June 1986 (age 39); Tunis, Tunisia
- Other names: Rym Saidi, Rim Saidi, Rym Saidi Breidy
- Education: Economics and mathematics sciences
- Occupations: Model, Actress
- Height: 181 cm (5 ft 11 in) https://www.selectmodel.com/paris/model/rym-saidi
- Spouse: Wissam Breidy (m. 2017)
- Children: 2

Rym Saidi Breidy (née Saidi) (Arabic: ريم بريدي) (born 21 June 1986 in Tunis) is a Tunisian model and actress.

== Modelling career ==
Rym Breidy (née Saidi) started her career as a model in 2003 after winning Elite Model Look Tunisia. In 2006, she won the first edition of the Arabic reality show Mission Fashion on LBC TV, under the supervision of the Lebanese fashion designer Elie Saab.

In 2007, she signed a modelling contract in Paris, and is currently represented by MP Models. She is also represented by Profile Models in London, Women Direct in Milan, One.1 management in New York City, Munich Models in Germany, and MP Mega in Miami.

In Italy, she appeared in a campaign for Wind with Italian comedian Giorgio Panariello, followed by an appearance as Mother Nature in the TV show Ciao Darwin.

== Tourism Ambassador For Tunisia ==
In Tunisia, Breidy has participated in campaigns to help promote the Tunisian tourism industry. She has been the face of the Tunisian travel agency Travel to do since 2013.

=== 2015 controversy ===
In 2015, comments made by Breidy during a radio interview regarding the security situation in Tunisia generated public debate. She later clarified that her remarks had been taken out of context and emphasized that she had participated in international campaigns promoting Tunisia as a tourist destination.

TravelTodo, for which she was serving as a tourism ambassador at the time, issued a statement noting that the remarks were made in a personal capacity and expressing concern about their potential impact on Tunisia’s tourism image. The agency subsequently indicated that its association with Breidy was under review.

== Personal life ==
Since 2008, Breidy has been living in Milan. She has also been studying economics and mathematics sciences part-time. On July 16, 2017, she married Lebanese television presenter Wissam Breidy in Milan. The couple met on the fourth season of the Arabic version of the reality television series Dancing With The Stars in 2016. It was love at first sight and the couple wed in civil marriage ceremony in her adopted home Milan. She credited her marriage success in her interview with Harper Bazaar Arabia, ″ We understand each other's work because we're in the same field and we support each other. ″ She tells Bazaar Junior. She continued praising her husband Wissam Breidy, ″ I was 32 and he was 35 when we met, so we had both already experienced a lot in life. We knew what we wanted and that we were looking for the same things. It was a nice combination.″

On 8 September 2018, she gave birth to a daughter, Bella Maria Breidy. Her second daughter, Aya Sophia, was born on 14 January 2020.
