= Vogue Arabia =

Arabian fashion magazine

- Gigi Hadid photographed by Inez and Vinoodh for March 2017, debut cover.
- Editor-in-Chief: Manuel Arnaut
- Categories: Fashion
- Frequency: Monthly
- Publisher: Nervora (2017–2024); Condé Nast Middle East (2025–present)
- First issue: March 2017
- Country: United Arab Emirates
- Based in: Dubai
- Language: Arabic, English
- Website: voguearabia.com

Vogue Arabia / Vogue العربية (stylised in all caps) is the Arabian-edition of the American fashion magazine Vogue. The magazine has been in operation since 2017. Based in the United Arab Emirates, the magazine is distributed across the Middle East.

== Background ==
Vogue Arabia is the Arabian-edition of the American fashion magazine Vogue magazine. The magazine is published eleven times per year (January, February, March, April, May, June, July/August, September, October, November, December). The magazine is published in two languages, Arabic and English.

The magazine was launched under a licence with Nervora, digitally in 2016 and followed by a print magazine in 2017. In 2025 Condé Nast took over the magazine and it is no longer licensed.

=== Circulation ===
Most of the magazines readers are in Saudi Arabia.

=== Editors ===
Editor	Start year	End year	Ref.
Editor-in-Chief
Deena Aljuhani Abdulaziz	2016	2017	
Manuel Arnaut	2017	2025	
Head of Editorial Content
Manuel Arnaut	2025	present	

=== Editions ===
The sister publications of Vogue Arabia are:

- Vogue Living Arabia (from 2020 to 2024)
- Vogue Man Arabia (from 2017 to 2024)

== History ==
=== Launch, Abdulaziz exit and arrival of Arnaut (2016–2024) ===
Vogue Arabia was launched in October 2016 website-only (in Arabic and English), making it the first edition of Vogue to launch digital-first. Saudi Arabian Princess Deena Aljuhani Abdulaziz was the magazines editor from launch. Condé Nast licensed the Vogue name to Dubai-based media company Nervora to launch the magazine.

The magazine launched its print edition in March 2017, it featured model Gigi Hadid photographed by Inez and Vinoodh and styled by Brandon Maxwell, Abdulaziz described Hadid on the cover as "in one poised photograph, she communicates a thousand words to a region that’s been waiting far too long for its Vogue voice to speak".

On 13 April after only two issues (March, April) Abdulaziz was fired, she stated "I am proud of what I have been able to accomplish in such a short space of time... It had initially been my intention to build this important and groundbreaking edition of Vogue from inception to a mature magazine in line with others in the Vogue stable." A day after the announcement of her exit it was announced by Shashi Menon (CEO of Nervora) that Manuel Arnaut (ex-editor of Architectural Digest Middle East) would be the new editor-in-chief.

Following a June 2018 cover with Princess Hayfa bint Abdullah al-Saud there was controversy on social media with netizens criticising the cover which featured al-Saud behind the wheel of a car in celebration of the Saudi Arabia lifting its ban on female drivers as the magazine omitted that women's rights activists who previously protested against the law were still under arrest.

=== Condé Nast era (2025–present) ===
In January 2025 the publication was taken over by Condé Nast, under Condé Nast ownership Arnaut will continue to edit the magazine now as Head of Editorial Content.

== See also ==
- Vogue, American edition in publication since 1892
- List of Vogue Arabia cover models
