= Hanaa Ben Abdesslem =

Tunisian model

- Born: October 18, 1990 (age 36); Nabeul, Tunisia
- Occupation: Model
- Known for: First Muslim spokesmodel for Lancôme
- Modeling information
- Height: 5 ft 10 in (1.78 m)
- Hair color: Black
- Eye color: Brown
- Agency: NEXT Model Management (New York, Paris, Milan, London); Traffic Models (Barcelona); Boss Models (Cape Town); Modelwerk (Hamburg)

Hanaa Ben Abdesslem (born October 18, 1990) is a Tunisian model. She has worked with such designers as Jean Paul Gautier, Vivienne Westwood, Chanel, Oscar de la Renta, and Anna Sui. She is the first Arab model to be featured in the Pirelli calendar as well as the first Muslim spokesmodel for the French perfume and cosmetic house Lancôme.

== Career ==
Ben Abdesslem was a contestant on Mission Fashion 2 in 2007, the Lebanese version of Project Runway; She placed second. She was studying engineering before deciding to become a model. In 2010, she signed with IMG modeling agency. She got her runway debut in London with Vivienne Westwood in 2010; She walked for Givenchy in the same year.

In 2011, she walked for such brands as Chanel, Thierry Mugler, Giambattista Valli, Ralph Lauren, Anna Sui, Oscar de la Renta, Giambattista Valli, Jean Paul Gaultier, Narciso Rodriguez, and Hermès.

Lancôme signed Ben Abdesslem in 2012, making her the first Muslim spokesperson for the brand.

She has posed for Vogue Paris, Italy, Netherlands, Thailand, Spain, and Germany. Ben Abdesslem has also been featured in W, Dazed and Confused, V, and the Russian magazine Interview.

Haute couture brand Ralph & Russo chose Ben Abdesslem to close their 2014-15 Autumn/Winter collection.

In 2016 she moved to NEXT Model Management worldwide.

== Philanthropy ==
Ben Abdesslem has been the spokesperson for the NGO Esmaani, since July 2011, which focuses on giving emotional and psychological support to people in hospitals in poverty-stricken areas. She has also been involved with the NGO Youth Empowerment development association (YEDA): their focus is to inspire and support Tunisian youth.
