= List of Wide Angle episodes =

This is a list of episodes for the PBS documentary television series Wide Angle.

== Season 1: 2002 ==
No.	Title	Directed by	Awards	Original release date
1	"Saddam's Ultimate Solution"	Gwynne Roberts	1	July 11, 2002
2	"To Have and Have Not"	Jon Alpert	1	July 18, 2002 (Note: This episode was updated and rebroadcast on July 31, 2003.)
3	"Greetings from Grozny"	Paul Mitchell and Tania Rakhmanova	5	July 25, 2002
4	"Land of Wandering Souls"	Rithy Panh	—	August 1, 2002
5	"The Empty ATM"	Angus MacQueen	2	August 8, 2002
6	"Bitter Harvest"	Unknown	—	August 22, 2002
7	"Growing Up Global"	Bruno Sorrentino	1	August 29, 2002
8	"Cause for Murder"	Pamela Yates	—	September 5, 2002
9	"Media by Milosevic"	Leslie Woodhead	—	September 12, 2002
10	"Soul of India"	Steven Silver	1	September 19, 2002

== Season 2: 2003 ==
No.	Title	Directed by	Awards	Original release date
1	"Exclusive to al-Jazeera"	Unknown	1	July 10, 2003
2	"The Rock Star and the Mullahs"	Ruhi Hamid and Angus MacQueen	1	July 17, 2003
3	"AIDS Warriors"	Unknown	1	July 24, 2003
4	"Coca and the Congressman"	Jon Alpert	1	August 7, 2003
5	"Citizen Berlusconi – The Prime Minister and the Press"	Susan Gray	1	August 21, 2003
6	"Road to Riches"	Mandy Jacobson	—	August 28, 2003
7	"Time for School"	Unknown	2	September 4, 2003 (Note: This episode was updated and rebroadcast on September 2, 2004.)
8	"A State of Mind"	Dan Gordon	2	September 11, 2003
9	"The Dammed"	Franny Armstrong	—	September 18, 2003
10	"Dying to Leave"	Chris Hilton and Aaron Woolf	6	September 25, 2003 (Note: This is a two-hour episode. It was later edited to one hour and rebroadcast on July 29, 2004.)

== Season 3: 2004 ==
No.	Title	Directed by	Awards	Original release date
1	"Suicide Bombers"	Tom Roberts	2	July 1, 2004
2	"The Russian Newspaper Murders"	Paul Jenkins	1	July 8, 2004
3	"Ladies First"	Gini Reticker	4	July 22, 2004
4	"Sahara Marathon"	Aitor Arregi and Jon Garaño	—	August 19, 2004
5	"Young, Muslim, and French"	Unknown	1	August 26, 2004
6	"Hell of a Nation"	Tamara Gould	3	September 9, 2004
7	"An Honest Citizen"	Angus MacQueen	2	September 16, 2004
8	"Red Lines and Deadlines"	Taghi Amirani	2	September 23, 2004 (Note: This episode was updated and rebroadcast on August 2, 2005.)
9	"The Saudi Question"	Unknown	1	October 7, 2004

== 2005 special ==
No.	Title	Directed by	Awards	Original release date
—	"White Smoke"	Unknown	—	April 26, 2005
A look at the process of selecting a new pope in the days following the death of Pope John Paul II.

== Season 4: 2005 ==
No.	Title	Directed by	Awards	Original release date
1	"Beslan: Siege of School No. 1"	Kevin Sim	1	July 12, 2005
2	"Future for Lebanon"	Paul Mitchell	—	July 19, 2005
3	"Border Jumpers"	Peter Hutchens and Ryan Hill	1	July 26, 2005
4	"Gutted"	David Peat	1	August 23, 2005
5	"Pickles, Inc."	Dalit Kimor	2	August 30, 2005
6	"Unfinished Country"	Whitney Dow	—	September 6, 2005
7	"1-800-INDIA"	Safina Uberoi	4	September 13, 2005
8	"HSN1 · Killer Flu"	Steven Silver	2	September 20, 2005

== Season 5: 2006 ==
No.	Title	Directed by	Awards	Original release date
1	"18 with a Bullet"	Ricardo Pollack	1	July 11, 2006 (Note: This episode was updated and rebroadcast on August 5, 2008.)
2	"Mixed Blessings"	Darragh Byrne	—	July 18, 2006
3	"Class of 2006"	Gini Reticker	—	July 25, 2006
4	"Flying Down to Kabul"	Simone Aaberg Kaern and Magnus Bejmar	—	August 1, 2006
5	"Turkey's Tigers"	Jon Alpert and Matthew O'Neill	1	August 22, 2006
6	"Ransom City"	Benito Montorio	—	August 29, 2006
7	"Back to School"	Judy Katz	3	September 5, 2006 (Note: This is a 90-minute episode and represents the second installment of "Time for School" from season two. It was later edited to one hour and rebroadcast on July 17, 2007.)
8	"Democracy in the Rough"	Fred de Sam Lazaro	—	September 12, 2006

== 2007 special ==
No.	Title	Directed by	Awards	Original release date
—	"Pilgrimage To Karbala"	Kevin Sim	—	March 26, 2007
This is a 90-minute episode.

== Season 6: 2007 ==
No.	Title	Directed by	Awards	Original release date
1	"The People's Court"	Bruno Sorrentino	—	July 3, 2007
2	"Victory Is Your Duty"	Andrew Lang	—	July 10, 2007
3	"The Sand Castle"	Eirin Gjørv	—	July 24, 2007
4	"Dishing Democracy"	Bregtje van der Haak	—	July 31, 2007
5	"Gaza E.R."	Olly Lambert	—	August 14, 2007
6	"Gold Futures"	Tibor Kocsis	—	August 21, 2007
7	"The Dying Fields"	Fred de Sam Lazaro	—	August 28, 2007
8	"Brazil in Black and White"	Adam Stepan	—	September 4, 2007
9	"A Woman Among Warlords"	Eva Mulvad and Anja Al-Erhayem	—	September 11, 2007

== Season 7: 2008 ==
No.	Title	Directed by	Awards	Original release date
1	"Heart of Darfur"	Unknown	—	July 1, 2008
2	"Japan's About-Face"	Micah Fink	—	July 8, 2008
3	"Birth of a Surgeon"	Karin Falck	—	July 15, 2008
4	"Burning Season"	Cathy Henkel	—	July 22, 2008
5	"Lord’s Children"	Oliver Stoltz and Ali Samadi Ahadi	—	July 29, 2008
6	"China Prep"	Marije Meerman	—	August 12, 2008
7	"Iraqi Exodus"	Tania Rakhmanova	—	August 19, 2008

== Season 8: 2009 ==
No.	Title	Directed by	Awards	Original release date
1	"Crossing Heaven's Border"	Unknown	Emmy Nomination	July 1, 2009
2	"Heart of Jenin"	Leon Geller and Marcus Vetter	Overseas Press Club Award, Emmy Nomination	July 8, 2009
3	"Birth of a Surgeon"	Karin Falck	—	July 15, 2009
4	"The Market Maker"	Hugo Berkeley and Eli Kane	—	July 22, 2009
5	"Contestant No. 2"	Timna Goldstein Hattav and Barak Heymann	—	July 29, 2009
6	"Victory Is Your Duty (Update)"	Andrew Lang	—	August 12, 2009
7	"Eyes of the Storm"	Evan Williams and Jeremy Williams	—	August 19, 2009
8	"Once Upon a Coup"	Christopher Olgiati	—	August 26, 2009
9	"Time for School 3"	Pamela Hogan	—	September 2, 2009
