= 2024 United States House of Representatives elections in Tennessee =

- November 5, 2024

All 9 Tennessee seats to the United States House of Representatives
- Turnout: 64.04% ▲25.43 pp
| | Majority party | Minority party |
|---|---|---|
| Party | Republican | Democratic |
| Last election | 8 | 1 |
| Seats won | 8 | 1 |
| Seat change | Steady | Steady |
| Popular vote | 1,884,691 | 977,870 |
| Percentage | 64.39% | 33.41% |
| Swing | ▲0.11% | ▼0.61% |

Republican
50–60%
60–70%
70–80%
80–90%
Democratic
60–70%
70–80%

The 2024 United States House of Representatives elections in Tennessee were held on November 5, 2024, to elect the nine U.S. representatives from the State of Tennessee, one from each of the state's congressional districts. The elections coincided with the 2024 U.S. presidential election, other elections to the House of Representatives, elections to the United States Senate, and various state and local elections. Primary elections took place on August 1, 2024.

Following the 2024 elections, no seats changed hands, leaving the Tennessee delegation at an 8-1 Republican majority.

== Overview ==
| District | Republican | | Democratic | | Others | | Total | | Result |
| District | Votes | % | Votes | % | Votes | % | Votes | % | Result |
|---|---|---|---|---|---|---|---|---|---|
| District 1 | 257,825 | 78.08% | 64,021 | 19.39% | 8,353 | 2.53% | 330,199 | 100.00% | Republican hold |
| District 2 | 250,782 | 69.26% | 111,316 | 30.74% | 0 | 0.00% | 362,098 | 100.00% | Republican hold |
| District 3 | 236,519 | 67.51% | 102,841 | 29.36% | 10,968 | 3.13% | 350,328 | 100.00% | Republican hold |
| District 4 | 219,133 | 69.95% | 83,832 | 26.76% | 10,290 | 3.29% | 313,255 | 100.00% | Republican hold |
| District 5 | 205,075 | 56.85% | 142,387 | 39.47% | 13,252 | 3.68% | 360,714 | 100.00% | Republican hold |
| District 6 | 225,543 | 68.00% | 106,144 | 32.00% | 0 | 0.00% | 331,687 | 100.00% | Republican hold |
| District 7 | 191,992 | 59.50% | 122,764 | 38.05% | 7,900 | 2.45% | 322,656 | 100.00% | Republican hold |
| District 8 | 240,411 | 72.34% | 85,043 | 25.59% | 6,861 | 2.06% | 332,315 | 100.00% | Republican hold |
| District 9 | 57,411 | 25.66% | 159,522 | 71.31% | 6,770 | 3.03% | 223,703 | 100.00% | Democratic hold |
| Total | 1,884,691 | 64.39% | 977,870 | 33.41% | 64,394 | 2.20% | 2,926,955 | 100.00% | |

Popular vote
| Republican | 64.39% |
| Democratic | 33.41% |
| Other | 2.20% |

House seats
| Republican | 88.89% |
| Democratic | 11.11% |

== District 1 ==
2024 Tennessee's 1st congressional district election
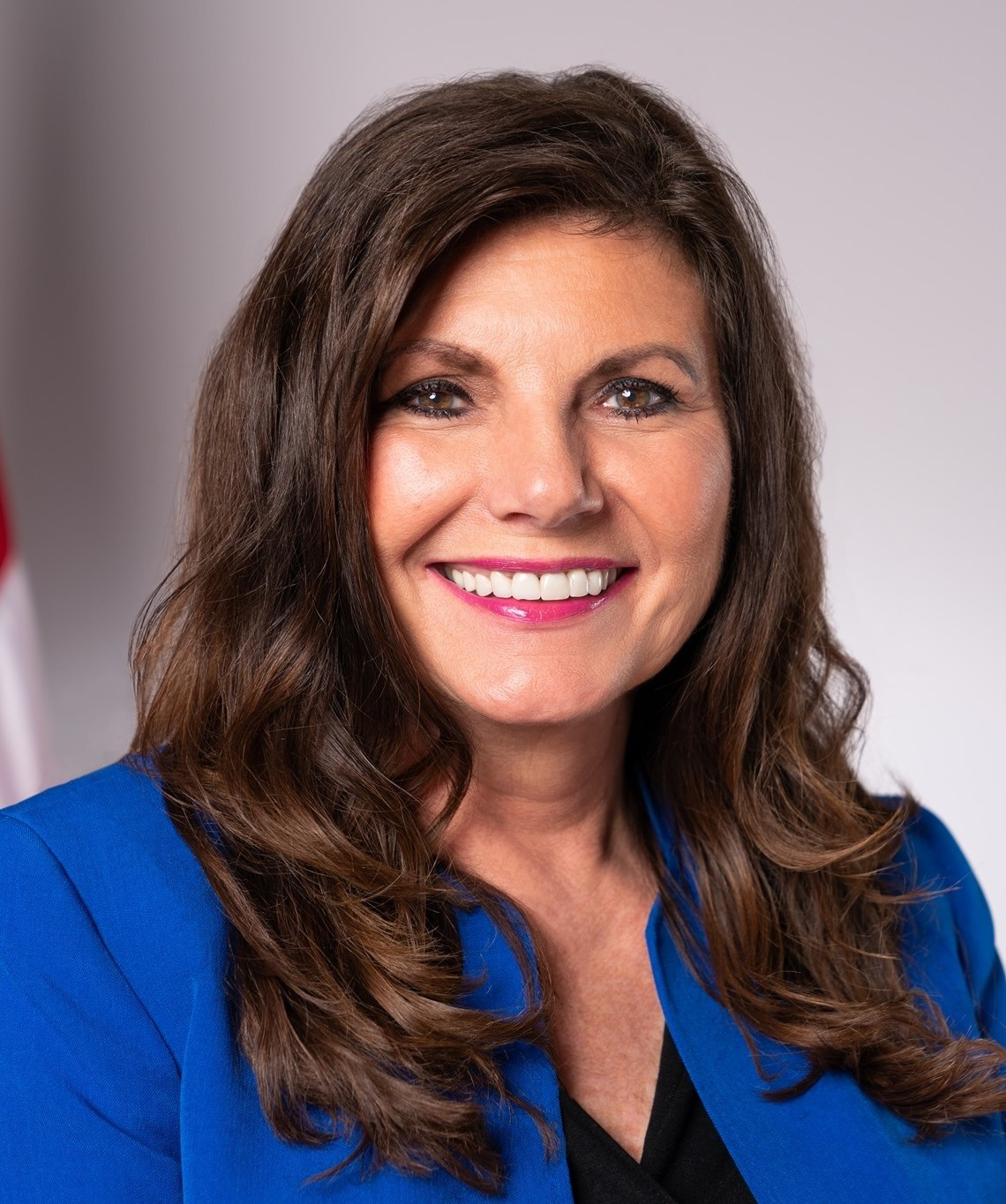

| Nominee | Diana Harshbarger | Kevin Jenkins |
| Party | Republican | Democratic |
| Popular vote | 257,825 | 64,021 |
| Percentage | 78.08% | 19.39% |
- Harshbarger: 50–60% 60–70% 70–80% 80–90% >90% Jenkins: 40–50% 60–70%
U.S. Representative before election
Diana Harshbarger
Republican
Elected U.S. Representative
Diana Harshbarger
Republican

The 1st district is based in northeast Tennessee, encompassing all of Carter, Cocke, Greene, Hamblen, Hancock, Hawkins, Johnson, Sullivan, Unicoi, and Washington counties and parts of Jefferson and Sevier counties, and includes the Tri-Cities region. The incumbent was Republican Diana Harshbarger, who was re-elected with 78.32% of the vote in 2022. She won re-election with 78.1% of the vote.

=== Republican primary ===
==== Nominee ====
- Diana Harshbarger, incumbent U.S. representative

==== Endorsements ====
Diana Harshbarger

U.S. executive branch officials

- Donald Trump, 45th president of the United States (2017–2021)

Organizations

- AIPAC

==== Fundraising ====
Campaign finance reports as of December 31, 2024
| Candidate | Raised | Spent | Cash on hand |
|---|---|---|---|
| Diana Harshbarger (R) | $1,930,833 | $1,415,175 | $1,450,769 |
Source: Federal Election Commission

==== Results ====
Republican primary results
| Party | Candidate | Votes | % |
|---|---|---|---|
| Republican | Diana Harshbarger (incumbent) | 52,190 | 100.00% |
| Total votes | | 52,190 | 100.00% |

=== Democratic primary ===
==== Nominee ====
- Kevin Jenkins, graphic designer

==== Eliminated in primary ====
- Bennett Lapides, IT professional

==== Results ====
Democratic primary results by county: Jenkins: 50–60%; 60–70%; 70–80%

Democratic primary results
| Party | Candidate | Votes | % |
|---|---|---|---|
| Democratic | Kevin Jenkins | 5,179 | 67.80% |
| Democratic | Bennett Lapides | 2,460 | 32.20% |
| Total votes | | 7,639 | 100.00% |

=== Independents ===
==== Declared ====
- Richard Baker, retired seasonal worker and candidate for this district in 2020 and 2022
- Levi Brake, blue collar worker

=== General election ===
==== Predictions ====
| Source | Ranking | As of |
|---|---|---|
| The Cook Political Report | Solid R | February 2, 2023 |
| Inside Elections | Solid R | March 10, 2023 |
| Sabato's Crystal Ball | Safe R | February 23, 2023 |
| Elections Daily | Safe R | September 7, 2023 |
| CNalysis | Solid R | November 16, 2023 |

==== Results ====
2024 Tennessee's 1st congressional district election results
| Party | Candidate | Votes | % |
|---|---|---|---|
| Republican | Diana Harshbarger (incumbent) | 257,825 | 78.08% |
| Democratic | Kevin Jenkins | 64,021 | 19.39% |
| Independent | Richard Baker | 5,714 | 1.73% |
| Independent | Levi Brake | 2,639 | 0.80% |
| Total votes | | 330,199 | 100.00% |
| Republican hold | | | |

==== By county ====
| County | Diana Harshbarger Republican | | Kevin Jenkins Democratic | | Other votes | | Total votes |
| County | % | # | % | # | % | # | Total votes |
|---|---|---|---|---|---|---|---|
| Carter | 80.73% | 18,707 | 16.59% | 3,844 | 2.68% | 621 | 23,172 |
| Cocke | 83.27% | 11,759 | 14.11% | 1,993 | 2.61% | 369 | 14,121 |
| Greene | 82.36% | 24,631 | 15.39% | 4,604 | 2.25% | 673 | 29,908 |
| Hamblen | 79.20% | 18,676 | 18.76% | 4,423 | 2.05% | 483 | 23,582 |
| Hancock | 86.38% | 2,277 | 11.49% | 303 | 2.12% | 56 | 2,636 |
| Hawkins | 82.68% | 20,141 | 14.66% | 3,571 | 2.66% | 649 | 24,361 |
| Jefferson | 81.35% | 18,182 | 16.46% | 3,678 | 2.20% | 491 | 22,351 |
| Johnson | 84.57% | 6,467 | 13.77% | 1,053 | 1.66% | 127 | 7,647 |
| Sevier | 79.84% | 33,587 | 17.87% | 7,516 | 2.30% | 967 | 42,070 |
| Sullivan | 76.25% | 56,699 | 20.89% | 15,536 | 2.86% | 2,124 | 74,359 |
| Unicoi | 80.76% | 6,454 | 16.83% | 1,345 | 2.41% | 193 | 7,992 |
| Washington | 69.39% | 40,245 | 27.85% | 16,155 | 2.76% | 1,600 | 58,000 |

== District 2 ==
2024 Tennessee's 2nd congressional district election
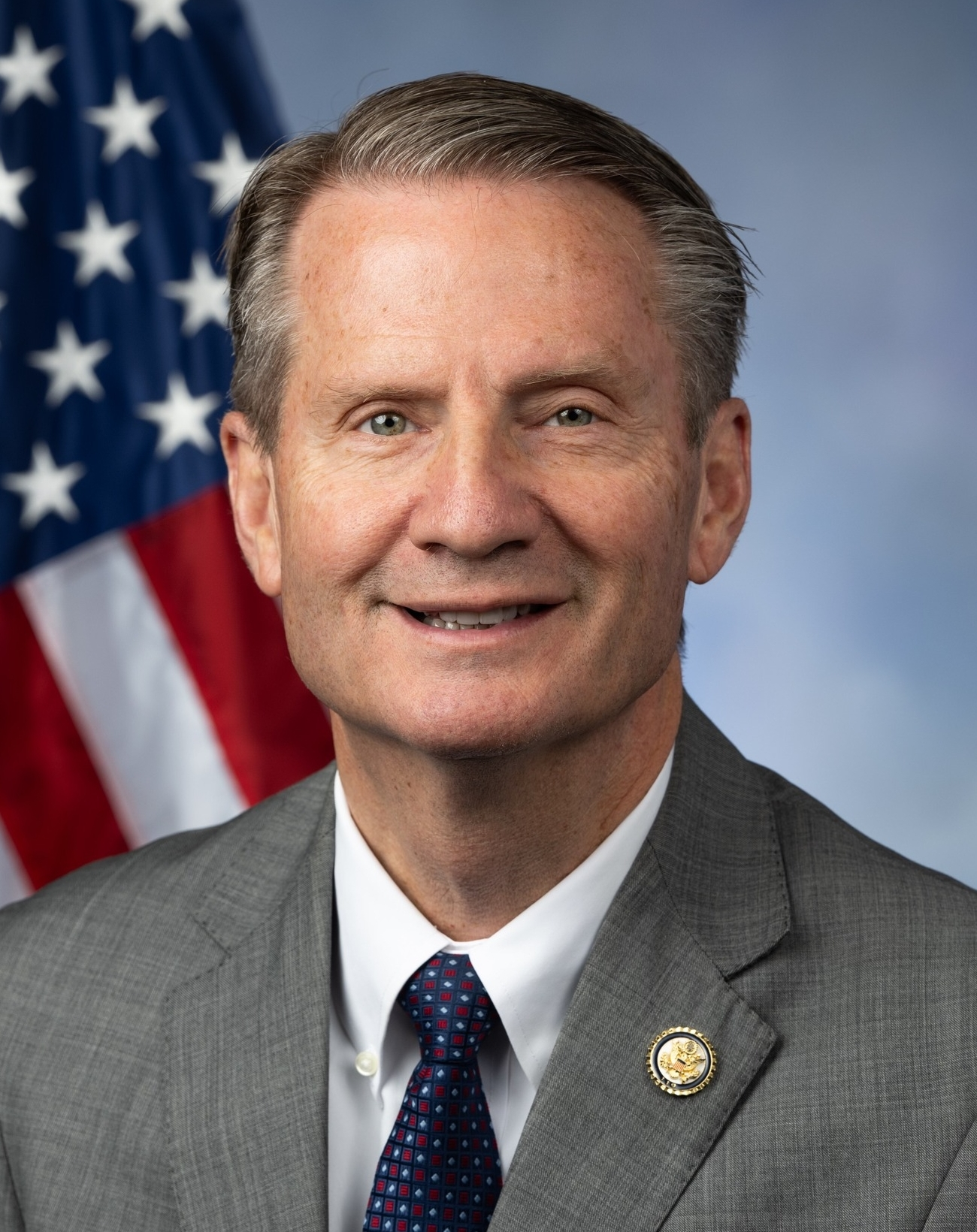

| Nominee | Tim Burchett | Jane George |
| Party | Republican | Democratic |
| Popular vote | 250,782 | 111,316 |
| Percentage | 69.26% | 30.74% |
- Burchett: 50–60% 60–70% 70–80% 80–90% >90% George: 50–60% 60–70% 70–80% 80–90% No data
U.S. Representative before election
Tim Burchett
Republican
Elected U.S. Representative
Tim Burchett
Republican

The 2nd district is located in eastern Tennessee, anchored by Knoxville. Incumbent Republican Tim Burchett, who was re-elected with 67.91% of the vote in 2022, ran for re-election.

Burchett won re-election with 69.26% of the vote, and once again delivered a strong performance in the district, surpassing both his previous election results and the top of the ticket in this cycle. Notably, he performed exceptionally well in Knox County, winning it with 62.4% of the vote.

During the campaign, Burchett paused congressional fundraising efforts, and encouraged donations to Hurricane Helene relief.

=== Republican primary ===
==== Nominee ====
- Tim Burchett, incumbent U.S. representative

==== Declined ====
- Jimmy Matlock, former state representative from the 21st district (2007–2019) and candidate for this district in 2018

==== Endorsements ====
Tim Burchett

U.S. executive branch officials

- Donald Trump, 45th president of the United States (2017–2021)

Organizations

- AIPAC
- Citizens Against Government Waste
- Citizens United Political Victory Fund
- Family Research Council (FRC) Action
- Huck PAC
- NRA Political Victory Fund
- National Right to Life Committee

==== Fundraising ====
Campaign finance reports as of December 31, 2024
| Candidate | Raised | Spent | Cash on hand |
|---|---|---|---|
| Tim Burchett (R) | $1,238,070 | $1,336,137 | $728,190 |
Source: Federal Election Commission

==== Results ====
Republican primary results
| Party | Candidate | Votes | % |
|---|---|---|---|
| Republican | Tim Burchett (incumbent) | 54,617 | 100.00% |
| Total votes | | 54,617 | 100.00% |

=== Democratic primary ===
==== Nominee ====
- Jane George, chiropractor

==== Endorsements ====
Jane George

Organizations

- Feminist Majority PAC

==== Fundraising ====
Campaign finance reports as of December 31, 2024
| Candidate | Raised | Spent | Cash on hand |
|---|---|---|---|
| Jane George (D) | $264,281 | $257,436 | $6,845 |
Source: Federal Election Commission

==== Results ====
Democratic primary results
| Party | Candidate | Votes | % |
|---|---|---|---|
| Democratic | Jane George | 25,910 | 100.00% |
| Total votes | | 25,910 | 100.00% |

=== General election ===
==== Predictions ====
| Source | Ranking | As of |
|---|---|---|
| The Cook Political Report | Solid R | February 2, 2023 |
| Inside Elections | Solid R | March 10, 2023 |
| Sabato's Crystal Ball | Safe R | February 23, 2023 |
| Elections Daily | Safe R | September 7, 2023 |
| CNalysis | Solid R | November 16, 2023 |

==== Results ====
2024 Tennessee's 2nd congressional district election results
| Party | Candidate | Votes | % |
|---|---|---|---|
| Republican | Tim Burchett (incumbent) | 250,782 | 69.26% |
| Democratic | Jane George | 111,316 | 30.74% |
| Total votes | | 362,098 | 100.00% |
| Republican hold | | | |

==== By county ====
| County | Tim Burchett Republican | | Jane George Democratic | | Total votes |
| County | % | # | % | # | Total votes |
|---|---|---|---|---|---|
| Blount | 76.34% | 52,172 | 23.66% | 16,170 | 68,342 |
| Campbell | 85.81% | 6,608 | 14.19% | 1,093 | 7,701 |
| Claiborne | 86.37% | 11,432 | 13.63% | 1,804 | 13,236 |
| Grainger | 88.47% | 9,661 | 11.53% | 1,259 | 10,920 |
| Jefferson | 82.20% | 845 | 17.80% | 183 | 1,028 |
| Knox | 62.41% | 137,759 | 37.59% | 82,965 | 220,724 |
| Loudon | 78.79% | 25,268 | 21.21% | 6,802 | 8,929 |
| Union | 87.12% | 7,037 | 12.88% | 1,040 | 8,077 |

== District 3 ==
2024 Tennessee's 3rd congressional district election
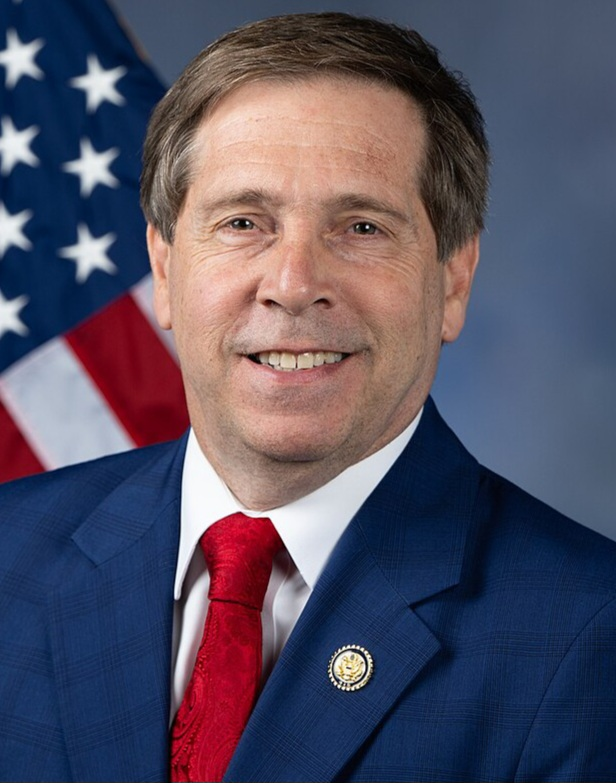

| Nominee | Chuck Fleischmann | Jack Allen |
| Party | Republican | Democratic |
| Popular vote | 236,519 | 102,841 |
| Percentage | 67.51% | 29.36% |
- Fleischmann: 40–50% 50–60% 60–70% 70–80% 80–90% >90% Allan: 40–50% 50–60% 60–70% 70–80% 80–90% Tie: 40–50% No data
U.S. Representative before election
Chuck Fleischmann
Republican
Elected U.S. Representative
Chuck Fleischmann
Republican

The 3rd district encompasses most of the Chattanooga metro in eastern Tennessee, along with several suburban and rural areas near Knoxville and the Tri-Cities. The incumbent was Republican Chuck Fleischmann, who was re-elected with 68.38% of the vote in 2022. He won re-election with 67.5% of the vote.

=== Republican primary ===
==== Nominee ====
- Chuck Fleischmann, incumbent U.S. representative

==== Endorsements ====
Chuck Fleischmann

U.S. executive branch officials

- Donald Trump, 45th president of the United States (2017–2021)

Organizations

- AIPAC

==== Fundraising ====
Campaign finance reports as of December 31, 2024
| Candidate | Raised | Spent | Cash on hand |
|---|---|---|---|
| Chuck Fleischmann (R) | $1,897,640 | $654,109 | $3,257,052 |
Source: Federal Election Commission

==== Results ====
Republican primary results
| Party | Candidate | Votes | % |
|---|---|---|---|
| Republican | Chuck Fleischmann (incumbent) | 44,990 | 100.00% |
| Total votes | | 44,990 | 100.00% |

=== Democratic primary ===
==== Nominee ====
- Jack Allen, former bank president

==== Fundraising ====
Campaign finance reports as of December 31, 2024
| Candidate | Raised | Spent | Cash on hand |
|---|---|---|---|
| Jack Allen (D) | $193,622 | $193,622 | $0.00 |
Source: Federal Election Commission

==== Results ====
Democratic primary results
| Party | Candidate | Votes | % |
|---|---|---|---|
| Democratic | Jack Allen | 17,918 | 100.00% |
| Total votes | | 17,918 | 100.00% |

=== Independents ===
==== Declared ====
- Jean Howard-Hill, retired college professor and perennial candidate
- Stephen King, hairdresser

=== General election ===
==== Predictions ====
| Source | Ranking | As of |
|---|---|---|
| The Cook Political Report | Solid R | February 2, 2023 |
| Inside Elections | Solid R | March 10, 2023 |
| Sabato's Crystal Ball | Safe R | February 23, 2023 |
| Elections Daily | Safe R | September 7, 2023 |
| CNalysis | Solid R | November 16, 2023 |

==== Results ====
2024 Tennessee's 3rd congressional district election results
| Party | Candidate | Votes | % |
|---|---|---|---|
| Republican | Chuck Fleischmann (incumbent) | 236,519 | 67.51% |
| Democratic | Jack Allen | 102,841 | 29.36% |
| Independent | Stephen King | 5,848 | 1.67% |
| Independent | Jean Howard-Hill | 5,120 | 1.46% |
| Total votes | | 350,328 | 100.00% |
| Republican hold | | | |

==== By county ====
| County | Chuck Fleischmann Republican | | Jack Allen Democratic | | Other votes | | Total votes |
| County | % | # | % | # | % | # | Total votes |
|---|---|---|---|---|---|---|---|
| Anderson | 68.07% | 24,159 | 28.98% | 10,285 | 2.95% | 1,047 | 35,491 |
| Bradley | 78.63% | 36,301 | 18.38% | 8,487 | 2.99% | 1,380 | 46,168 |
| Campbell | 82.55% | 5,832 | 14.64% | 1,034 | 2.82% | 199 | 7,065 |
| Hamilton | 57.01% | 97,614 | 39.55% | 67,720 | 3.45% | 5,902 | 171,236 |
| McMinn | 78.91% | 18,591 | 18.59% | 4,380 | 2.50% | 588 | 23,559 |
| Monroe | 82.07% | 17,742 | 15.17% | 3,279 | 2.76% | 596 | 21,617 |
| Morgan | 86.08% | 7,176 | 11.48% | 957 | 2.44% | 203 | 8,336 |
| Polk | 82.38% | 7,060 | 15.47% | 1,326 | 2.15% | 184 | 8,570 |
| Roane | 77.03% | 20,191 | 19.84% | 5,200 | 3.13% | 820 | 26,211 |
| Scott | 89.30% | 1,853 | 8.34% | 173 | 2.36% | 49 | 2,075 |

== District 4 ==
2024 Tennessee's 4th congressional district election
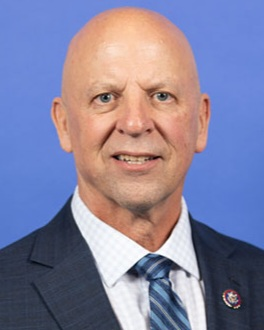

| Nominee | Scott DesJarlais | Victoria Broderick |
| Party | Republican | Democratic |
| Popular vote | 219,133 | 83,832 |
| Percentage | 69.95% | 26.76% |
- DesJarlais: 40–50% 50–60% 60–70% 70–80% 80–90% >90% Broderick: 50–60% 60–70%
U.S. Representative before election
Scott DesJarlais
Republican
Elected U.S. Representative
Scott DesJarlais
Republican

The 4th district encompasses the southern part of Middle Tennessee, including Murfreesboro and Lynchburg. The incumbent was Republican Scott DesJarlais, who was re-elected with 70.57% of the vote in 2022. He won re-election with 70.0% of the vote.

=== Republican primary ===
==== Nominee ====
- Scott DesJarlais, incumbent U.S. representative

==== Eliminated in primary ====
- Thomas Davis, former military veteran
- Joshua James, Rutherford County commissioner

==== Disqualified ====
- Joe Doctora, oral surgeon

==== Endorsements ====
Scott DesJarlais

U.S. executive branch officials

- Donald Trump, 45th president of the United States (2017–2021)

Organizations

- AIPAC

==== Fundraising ====
Campaign finance reports as of March 31, 2024
| Candidate | Raised | Spent | Cash on hand |
|---|---|---|---|
| Thomas Davis (R) | $5,825 | $2,751 | $3,374 |
| Joe Doctora (R) | $6,351 | $6,350 | $2 |
| Scott DesJarlais (R) | $134,518 | $134,250 | $316,331 |
Source: Federal Election Commission

==== Results ====
Republican primary results by county: DesJarlais: 60–70%; 70–80%

Republican primary results
| Party | Candidate | Votes | % |
|---|---|---|---|
| Republican | Scott DesJarlais (incumbent) | 30,425 | 72.53% |
| Republican | Thomas Davis | 7,988 | 19.04% |
| Republican | Joshua James | 3,535 | 8.43% |
| Total votes | | 41,948 | 100.00% |

=== Democratic primary ===
==== Nominee ====
- Victoria Broderick, customer support specialist

==== Results ====
Democratic primary results
| Party | Candidate | Votes | % |
|---|---|---|---|
| Democratic | Victoria Broderick | 11,708 | 100.00% |
| Total votes | | 11,708 | 100.00% |

=== Independents ===
==== Declared ====
- Earnest Ensley
- Keith Nolan

=== General election ===
==== Predictions ====
| Source | Ranking | As of |
|---|---|---|
| The Cook Political Report | Solid R | February 2, 2023 |
| Inside Elections | Solid R | March 10, 2023 |
| Sabato's Crystal Ball | Safe R | February 23, 2023 |
| Elections Daily | Safe R | September 7, 2023 |
| CNalysis | Solid R | November 16, 2023 |

==== Results ====
2024 Tennessee's 4th congressional district election results
| Party | Candidate | Votes | % |
|---|---|---|---|
| Republican | Scott DesJarlais (incumbent) | 219,133 | 69.95% |
| Democratic | Victoria Broderick | 83,832 | 26.76% |
| Independent | Keith Nolan | 5,601 | 1.79% |
| Independent | Earnest Ensley | 4,689 | 1.50% |
| Total votes | | 313,255 | 100.00% |
| Republican hold | | | |

==== By county ====
| County | Scott DesJarlais Republican | | Victoria Broderick Democratic | | Other votes | | Total votes |
| County | % | # | % | # | % | # | Total votes |
|---|---|---|---|---|---|---|---|
| Bedford | 78.20% | 14,358 | 18.94% | 3,478 | 2.86% | 525 | 18,361 |
| Bledsoe | 83.45% | 4,987 | 13.72% | 820 | 2.83% | 169 | 5,976 |
| Coffee | 75.35% | 18,037 | 21.25% | 5,086 | 3.40% | 814 | 23,937 |
| Franklin | 75.18% | 13,834 | 21.81% | 4,013 | 3.01% | 554 | 18,401 |
| Giles | 76.66% | 9,248 | 20.45% | 2,467 | 2.88% | 348 | 12,063 |
| Grundy | 81.05% | 4,564 | 15.18% | 855 | 3.76% | 212 | 5,631 |
| Lawrence | 82.16% | 14,109 | 14.76% | 2,535 | 3.08% | 529 | 17,173 |
| Lincoln | 81.17% | 12,491 | 16.17% | 2,488 | 2.66% | 409 | 15,388 |
| Marion | 76.41% | 10,376 | 20.59% | 2,796 | 3.00% | 407 | 13,579 |
| Meigs | 81.33% | 4,430 | 15.59% | 849 | 3.08% | 168 | 5,447 |
| Moore | 82.66% | 2,894 | 14.02% | 491 | 3.31% | 116 | 3,501 |
| Rhea | 82.13% | 11,457 | 14.92% | 2,082 | 2.95% | 411 | 13,950 |
| Rutherford | 59.08% | 81,334 | 37.42% | 51,523 | 3.50% | 4,821 | 137,678 |
| Sequatchie | 80.91% | 5,751 | 15.63% | 1,111 | 3.46% | 246 | 7,108 |
| Warren | 74.78% | 11,263 | 21.50% | 3,238 | 3.72% | 561 | 15,062 |

== District 5 ==
2024 Tennessee's 5th congressional district election
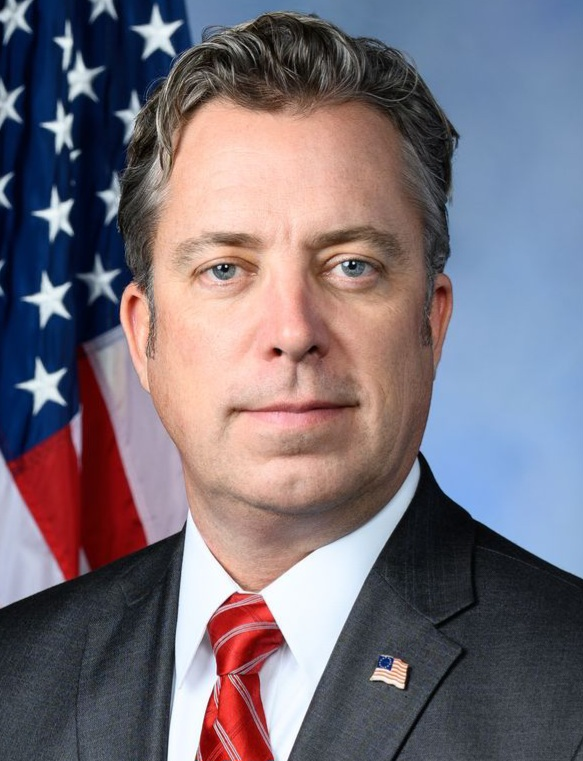

| Nominee | Andy Ogles | Maryam Abolfazli |
| Party | Republican | Democratic |
| Popular vote | 205,075 | 142,387 |
| Percentage | 56.85% | 39.47% |
- Ogles: 40–50% 50–60% 60–70% 70–80% 80–90% Abolfazli: 40–50% 50–60% 60–70% 70–80% Tie: 40–50% No data
U.S. Representative before election
Andy Ogles
Republican
Elected U.S. Representative
Andy Ogles
Republican

The 5th district comprises a southern portion of Davidson County; portions of Wilson and Williamson Counties; and the entirety of Maury, Lewis, and Marshall Counties. The incumbent was Republican Andy Ogles, who flipped the district and was elected to a first term with 55.84% of the vote in 2022.

Andy Ogles faced a challenge from Nashville Metro Councilwoman Courtney Johnston. Johnston’s campaign focused on Ogles’ legislative effectiveness, arguing the district "deserves a Member of Congress who is interested in fighting for our beliefs instead of just fighting for headlines." Ogles ran on his record as a member of the House Freedom Caucus and received the endorsement of President Donald Trump. Despite Johnston out-fundraising Ogles in the final months of the campaign, Ogles won the nomination on August 1st with 56.5% of the vote.

The general election campaign was marked by news that the FBI had executed a search warrant for Ogles' cell phone on August 2, as part of an ongoing investigation into discrepancies in his campaign finance disclosures—specifically a $320,000 loan he claimed to have made to his 2022 campaign that was later retracted.

Despite the controversy and a heated campaign by Abolfazli, the district's partisan lean remained favorable to the Republican incumbent. Ogles was re-elected with 56.9% of the vote, an improvement over his 2022 performance. He narrowly flipped Forest Hills and performed a little better in Davidson County, as well as in every other county.

=== Republican primary ===
==== Nominee ====
- Andy Ogles, incumbent U.S. representative

==== Eliminated in primary ====
- Courtney Johnston, Nashville metro councilor

==== Withdrawn ====
- Tom Guarente, cybersecurity executive

==== Declined ====
- Rush Benton, financial professional

==== Endorsements ====
Andy Ogles

U.S. executive branch officials

- Donald Trump, 45th president of the United States (2017–2021)

U.S. senators

- Ted Cruz, U.S. senator from Texas (2013–present)
- Bill Hagerty, U.S. senator from Tennessee (2021–present)
- Mike Lee, U.S. senator from Utah (2011–present)

U.S. representatives

- Mike Johnson, 56th speaker of the United States House of Representatives and U.S. representative from Louisiana's 4th congressional district (2017–present)
- Jim Jordan, U.S. representative from Ohio's 4th congressional district (2007–present)

Organizations

- AIPAC
- Coalition for Jewish Values
- Republican Liberty Caucus

Individuals

- Ben Carson, former United States secretary of housing and urban development
Courtney Johnston

U.S. senators

- Bob Corker, former U.S. senator from Tennessee (2007–2019)

Governors

- Bill Haslam, former governor of Tennessee (2011–2019)

==== Fundraising ====
Campaign finance reports as of August 1, 2024
| Candidate | Raised | Spent | Cash on hand |
|---|---|---|---|
| Andy Ogles (R) | $722,437 | $520,873 | $263,926 |
| Courtney Johnston (R) | $784,799 | $541,660 | $305,501 |
Source: Federal Election Commission

==== Results ====
Republican primary results by county: Ogles: 50–60%; 60–70%; 70–80%; Johnston: 50–60%

Republican primary results
| Party | Candidate | Votes | % |
|---|---|---|---|
| Republican | Andy Ogles (incumbent) | 32,062 | 56.54% |
| Republican | Courtney Johnston | 24,646 | 43.46% |
| Total votes | | 56,708 | 100.00% |

==== By county ====
| County | Andy Ogles Republican | | Courtney Johnston Republican | | Total votes |
| County | % | # | % | # | Total votes |
|---|---|---|---|---|---|
| Davidson | 42.23% | 6,697 | 57.77% | 9,160 | 15,857 |
| Lewis | 76.87% | 1,246 | 23.13% | 375 | 1,621 |
| Marshall | 64.07% | 2,536 | 35.93% | 1,422 | 3,958 |
| Maury | 64.33% | 6,532 | 35.67% | 3,622 | 10,154 |
| Williamson | 58.44% | 9,328 | 41.56% | 6,633 | 15,961 |
| Wilson | 62.50% | 5,723 | 37.50% | 3,434 | 9,157 |

=== Democratic primary ===
==== Nominee ====
- Maryam Abolfazli, nonprofit executive and chair of the Nashville Human Relations Commission

==== Disqualified ====
- Arnie Malham, businessman
- Kiran Sreepada, public policy consultant and nominee for the 7th district in 2020

==== Results ====
Democratic primary results
| Party | Candidate | Votes | % |
|---|---|---|---|
| Democratic | Maryam Abolfazli | 29,242 | 100.00% |
| Total votes | | 29,242 | 100.00% |

=== Independents ===
==== Declared ====
- Yomi Faparusi, physician and perennial candidate
- Bob Titley, retired country music talent manager

=== General election ===
==== Total fundraising ====
Campaign finance reports as of December 31, 2024
| Candidate | Raised | Spent | Cash on hand |
|---|---|---|---|
| Andy Ogles (R) | $986,221 | $1,049,024 | $61,921 |
| Maryam Abolfazli (D) | $428,528 | $428,528 | $0.00 |
Source: Federal Election Commission

==== Predictions ====
| Source | Ranking | As of |
|---|---|---|
| The Cook Political Report | Solid R | February 2, 2023 |
| Inside Elections | Solid R | March 10, 2023 |
| Sabato's Crystal Ball | Likely R | February 23, 2023 |
| Elections Daily | Likely R | October 10, 2024 |
| CNalysis | Likely R | August 18, 2024 |

==== Results ====
2024 Tennessee's 5th congressional district election results
| Party | Candidate | Votes | % |
|---|---|---|---|
| Republican | Andy Ogles (incumbent) | 205,075 | 56.85% |
| Democratic | Maryam Abolfazli | 142,387 | 39.47% |
| Independent | Jim Larkin | 7,607 | 2.11% |
| Independent | Bob Titley | 3,065 | 0.85% |
| Independent | Yomi Faparusi | 2,580 | 0.72% |
| Total votes | | 360,714 | 100.00% |
| Republican hold | | | |

==== By county ====
| County | Andy Ogles Republican | | Maryam Abolfazli Democratic | | Other votes | | Total votes |
| County | % | # | % | # | % | # | Total votes |
|---|---|---|---|---|---|---|---|
| Davidson | 39.11% | 53,142 | 57.17% | 77,673 | 3.72% | 5,055 | 135,870 |
| Lewis | 79.87% | 4,515 | 16.42% | 928 | 3.72% | 210 | 5,653 |
| Marshall | 76.12% | 11,088 | 20.46% | 2,980 | 3.42% | 498 | 14,566 |
| Maury | 68.92% | 35,040 | 26.93% | 13,690 | 4.15% | 2,112 | 50,842 |
| Williamson | 65.77% | 62,135 | 30.92% | 29,210 | 3.32% | 3,128 | 94,473 |
| Wilson | 66.02% | 39,155 | 30.19% | 17,906 | 3.79% | 2,249 | 59,310 |

== District 6 ==
2024 Tennessee's 6th congressional district election
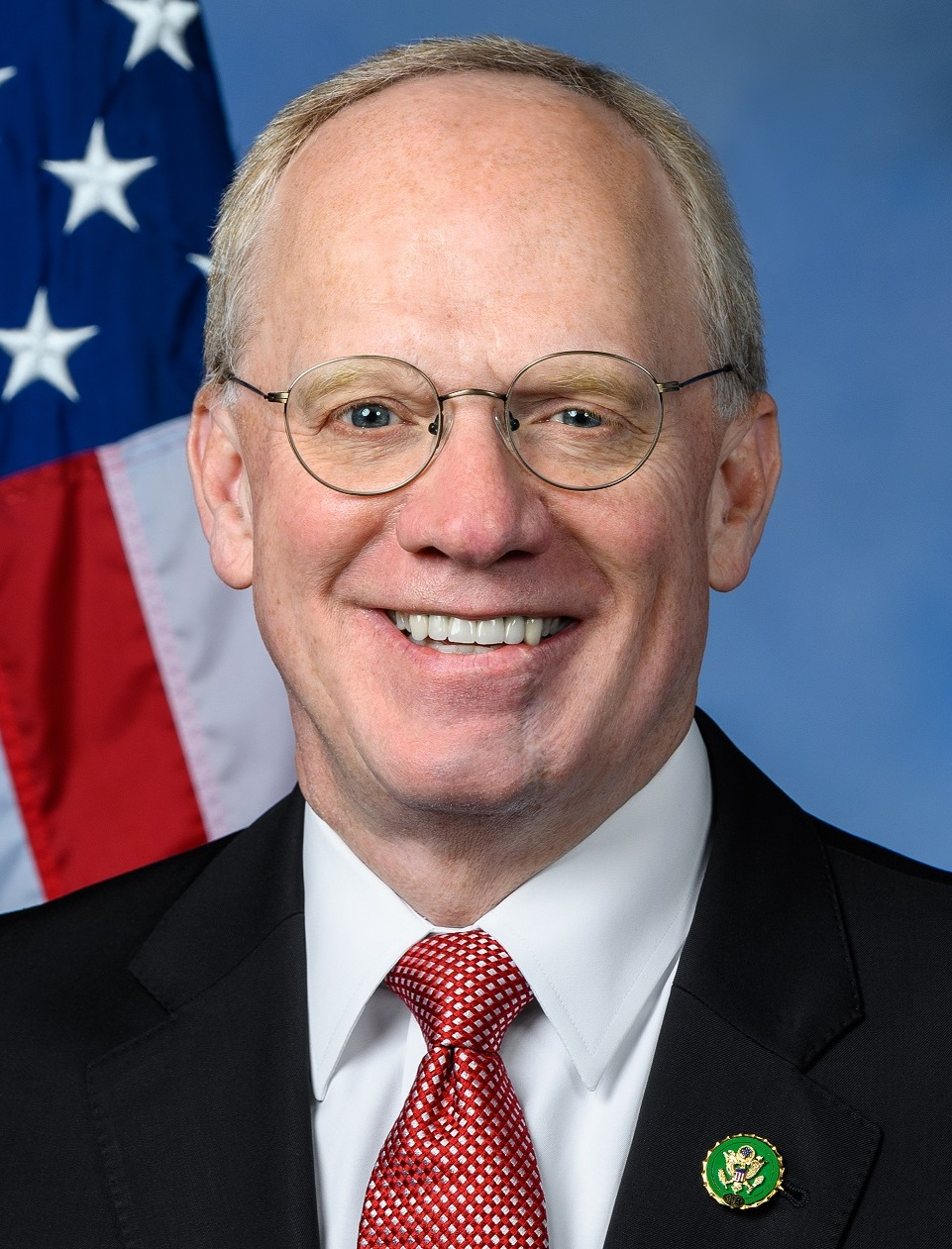

| Nominee | John Rose | Lore Bergman |
| Party | Republican | Democratic |
| Popular vote | 225,543 | 106,144 |
| Percentage | 68.00% | 32.00% |
- Rose: 50–60% 60–70% 70–80% 80–90% >90% Bergman: 50–60% 60–70% 70–80% 80–90%
U.S. Representative before election
John Rose
Republican
Elected U.S. Representative
John Rose
Republican

The 6th district encompasses the eastern portions and suburbs of Nashville and extends across northern Middle Tennessee. It includes the cities of Hendersonville and Gallatin, as well as the eastern portion of Lebanon. The district continues eastward across the Cumberland Plateau, including the regional centers of Cookeville and Crossville, and reaches as far as Scott County, where East Tennessee begins. The incumbent was Republican John Rose, who was re-elected with 66.33% of the vote in 2022. He won re-election with 68.0% of the vote.

=== Republican primary ===
==== Nominee ====
- John Rose, incumbent U.S. representative

==== Endorsements ====
John Rose

U.S. executive branch officials

- Donald Trump, 45th president of the United States (2017–2021)

Organizations

- AIPAC

==== Fundraising ====
Campaign finance reports as of March 31, 2024
| Candidate | Raised | Spent | Cash on hand |
|---|---|---|---|
| John Rose (R) | $1,171,925 | $645,543 | $1,358,705 |
Source: Federal Election Commission

==== Results ====
Republican primary results
| Party | Candidate | Votes | % |
|---|---|---|---|
| Republican | John Rose (incumbent) | 38,607 | 100.00% |
| Total votes | | 38,607 | 100.00% |

=== Democratic primary ===
==== Nominee ====
- Lore Bergman, community advocate

==== Eliminated in primary ====
- Clay Faircloth, career counselor and candidate for this district in 2022
- Cyril Focht, college professor

==== Fundraising ====
Campaign finance reports as of March 31, 2024
| Candidate | Raised | Spent | Cash on hand |
|---|---|---|---|
| Cyril Focht (D) | $56,142 (Note: $33,894 of this total was self-funded by Focht) | $51,713 | $4,429 |
| John Kennedy (D) | $11,476 | $8,336 | $3,140 |
Source: Federal Election Commission

==== Results ====
Democratic primary results by county: Bergman: 40–50%; 50–60%; Faircloth: 30–40%; 40–50%

Democratic primary results
| Party | Candidate | Votes | % |
|---|---|---|---|
| Democratic | Lore Bergman | 8,684 | 42.20% |
| Democratic | Clay Faircloth | 7,474 | 36.32% |
| Democratic | Cyril Focht | 4,422 | 21.49% |
| Total votes | | 20,580 | 100.00% |

=== General election ===
==== Predictions ====
| Source | Ranking | As of |
|---|---|---|
| The Cook Political Report | Solid R | February 2, 2023 |
| Inside Elections | Solid R | March 10, 2023 |
| Sabato's Crystal Ball | Safe R | February 23, 2023 |
| Elections Daily | Safe R | September 7, 2023 |
| CNalysis | Solid R | November 16, 2023 |

==== Results ====
2024 Tennessee's 6th congressional district election results
| Party | Candidate | Votes | % |
|---|---|---|---|
| Republican | John Rose (incumbent) | 225,543 | 68.00% |
| Democratic | Lore Bergman | 106,144 | 32.00% |
| Total votes | | 331,687 | 100.00% |
| Republican hold | | | |

==== By county ====
| County | John Rose Republican | | Lore Bergman Democratic | | Total votes |
| County | % | # | % | # | Total votes |
|---|---|---|---|---|---|
| Cannon | 83.25% | 5,214 | 16.75% | 1,049 | 6,263 |
| Clay | 84.86% | 2,751 | 15.14% | 491 | 3,242 |
| Cumberland | 80.73% | 25,375 | 19.27% | 6,056 | 31,431 |
| Davidson | 30.81% | 21,750 | 69.19% | 48,853 | 70,603 |
| DeKalb | 82.31% | 7,001 | 17.69% | 1,505 | 8,506 |
| Fentress | 88.51% | 7,939 | 11.49% | 1,031 | 8,970 |
| Jackson | 81.41% | 4,134 | 18.59% | 944 | 5,078 |
| Macon | 87.38% | 7,948 | 12.62% | 1,148 | 9,096 |
| Overton | 82.56% | 8,185 | 17.44% | 1,729 | 9,914 |
| Pickett | 83.96% | 2,361 | 16.04% | 451 | 2,812 |
| Putnam | 74.73% | 24,290 | 25.27% | 8,212 | 32,502 |
| Scott | 88.94% | 5,059 | 11.06% | 629 | 5,688 |
| Smith | 84.41% | 7,260 | 15.59% | 1,341 | 8,601 |
| Sumner | 72.13% | 65,313 | 27.87% | 25,235 | 90,548 |
| Trousdale | 79.90% | 3,014 | 20.10% | 758 | 3,772 |
| Van Buren | 82.85% | 2,391 | 17.15% | 495 | 2,886 |
| Warren | 78.13% | 150 | 21.88% | 42 | 192 |
| White | 84.03% | 10,546 | 15.97% | 2,005 | 12,551 |
| Wilson | 78.09% | 14,862 | 21.91% | 4,170 | 19,032 |

== District 7 ==
2024 Tennessee's 7th congressional district election
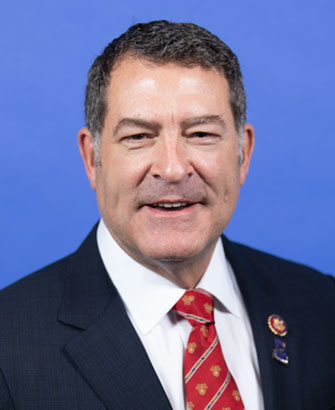

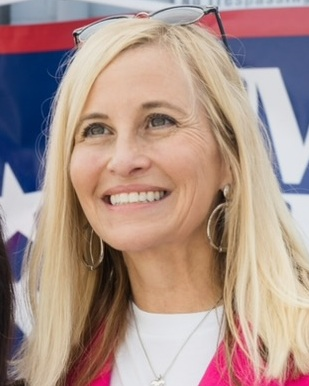
| Nominee | Mark Green | Megan Barry |
| Party | Republican | Democratic |
| Popular vote | 191,992 | 122,764 |
| Percentage | 59.50% | 38.05% |
- Green: 40–50% 50–60% 60–70% 70–80% 80–90% >90% Barry: 40–50% 50–60% 60–70% 70–80% 80–90% >90% No data
U.S. Representative before election
Mark Green
Republican
Elected U.S. Representative
Mark Green
Republican

The 7th district is centered in Middle Tennessee, anchored by significant portions of Nashville and its western suburbs. The district includes most of Franklin as well as the western half of Williamson County, along with nearby communities such as Ashland City, Pleasant View, Dickson, Springfield, and part of White House.

To the northwest, the district prominently includes Clarksville, one of the state's largest cities anchored by Fort Campbell.

Beyond that the district stretches southward to the Alabama border, encompassing a large swath of predominantly rural counties.

The incumbent was Republican Mark Green, who was re-elected with 59.96% of the vote in 2022. Green initially indicated he would run for re-election, only to announce on February 14, 2024 that he would retire from Congress. However, two weeks later, Green reversed course and said he would run for re-election in 2024.

This election featured two candidates with controversial pasts: former Nashville Mayor Megan Barry, who had faced scandals during her tenure, and Mark Green, recently embroiled in his own controversy. Both scandals revolved around affairs.

In the general election, Green comfortably won re-election with 59.5% of the vote.

=== Republican primary ===
==== Nominee ====
- Mark Green, incumbent U.S. representative

==== Disqualified ====
- Caleb Stack, mediator

==== Withdrawn ====
- Brandon Ogles, former state representative from the 61st district (2019–2023) and cousin of U.S. Representative Andy Ogles (endorsed Green)

==== Declined ====
- Jack Johnson, majority leader of the Tennessee Senate (2019–present) from the 27th district (2007–present)
- Bill Powers, state senator from the 22nd district (2019–present)
- Alice Rolli, former aide to Governor Bill Haslam and U.S. Senator Lamar Alexander; runner-up for mayor of Nashville in 2023

==== Endorsements ====
Mark Green

U.S. executive branch officials

- Donald Trump, 45th president of the United States (2017–2021)

Organizations

- AIPAC

State legislators

- Brandon Ogles, former state representative from the 61st district (2019–2023)

==== Fundraising ====
Campaign finance reports as of December 31, 2024
| Candidate | Raised | Spent | Cash on hand |
|---|---|---|---|
| Mark Green (R) | $2,193,882 | $2,254,372 | $66,857 |
Source: Federal Election Commission

==== Results ====
Republican primary results
| Party | Candidate | Votes | % |
|---|---|---|---|
| Republican | Mark Green (incumbent) | 31,871 | 100.00% |
| Total votes | | 31,871 | 100.00% |

=== Democratic primary ===
==== Nominee ====
- Megan Barry, former mayor of Nashville (2015–2018)

==== Endorsements ====
Megan Barry

U.S. representatives

- Jim Cooper, former U.S. representative from Tennessee's 5th congressional district (2003–2023)

Local officials

- Freddie O'Connell, mayor of Nashville (2023–present)

Individuals

- Connie Britton, actress

Labor unions

- Tennessee AFL-CIO

Organizations

- Tennessee College Democrats

==== Fundraising ====
Campaign finance reports as of December 31, 2024
| Candidate | Raised | Spent | Cash on hand |
|---|---|---|---|
| Megan Barry (D) | $1,246,180 | $1,246,180 | $0.00 |
Source: Federal Election Commission

==== Results ====
Democratic primary results
| Party | Candidate | Votes | % |
|---|---|---|---|
| Democratic | Megan Barry | 22,512 | 100.00% |
| Total votes | | 22,512 | 100.00% |

=== Independents ===
==== Declared ====
- Shaun Greene

=== General election ===
==== Predictions ====
| Source | Ranking | As of |
|---|---|---|
| The Cook Political Report | Solid R | February 2, 2023 |
| Inside Elections | Solid R | March 10, 2023 |
| Sabato's Crystal Ball | Safe R | February 23, 2023 |
| Elections Daily | Safe R | September 7, 2023 |
| CNalysis | Solid R | November 16, 2023 |

==== Results ====
2024 Tennessee's 7th congressional district election results
| Party | Candidate | Votes | % |
|---|---|---|---|
| Republican | Mark Green (incumbent) | 191,992 | 59.50% |
| Democratic | Megan Barry | 122,764 | 38.05% |
| Independent | Shaun Greene | 7,900 | 2.45% |
| Total votes | | 322,656 | 100.00% |
| Republican hold | | | |

==== By county ====
| County | Mark Green Republican | | Megan Barry Democratic | | Shaun Greene Independent | | Total votes |
| County | % | # | % | # | % | # | Total votes |
|---|---|---|---|---|---|---|---|
| Benton | 79.73% | 3,867 | 18.39% | 892 | 1.88% | 91 | 4,850 |
| Cheatham | 69.90% | 14,266 | 27.42% | 5,596 | 2.68% | 546 | 20,408 |
| Davidson | 30.25% | 21,740 | 66.97% | 48,125 | 2.78% | 1,997 | 71,862 |
| Decatur | 82.02% | 4,224 | 16.47% | 848 | 1.51% | 78 | 5,150 |
| Dickson | 73.06% | 17,677 | 24.92% | 6,030 | 2.02% | 489 | 24,196 |
| Hickman | 77.74% | 7,881 | 20.19% | 2,047 | 2.07% | 210 | 10,138 |
| Houston | 76.27% | 2,806 | 22.13% | 814 | 1.60% | 59 | 3,679 |
| Humphreys | 74.77% | 6,054 | 23.35% | 1,891 | 1.88% | 152 | 8,097 |
| Montgomery | 58.44% | 45,449 | 38.73% | 30,119 | 2.83% | 2,201 | 77,769 |
| Perry | 80.98% | 2,776 | 17.53% | 601 | 1.49% | 51 | 3,428 |
| Robertson | 72.53% | 23,808 | 25.14% | 8,254 | 2.33% | 764 | 32,826 |
| Stewart | 79.42% | 5,018 | 17.89% | 1,130 | 2.69% | 170 | 6,318 |
| Wayne | 86.21% | 5,420 | 11.96% | 752 | 1.83% | 115 | 6,287 |
| Williamson | 65.07% | 31,006 | 32.88% | 15,665 | 2.05% | 977 | 47,648 |

== District 8 ==
2024 Tennessee's 8th congressional district election
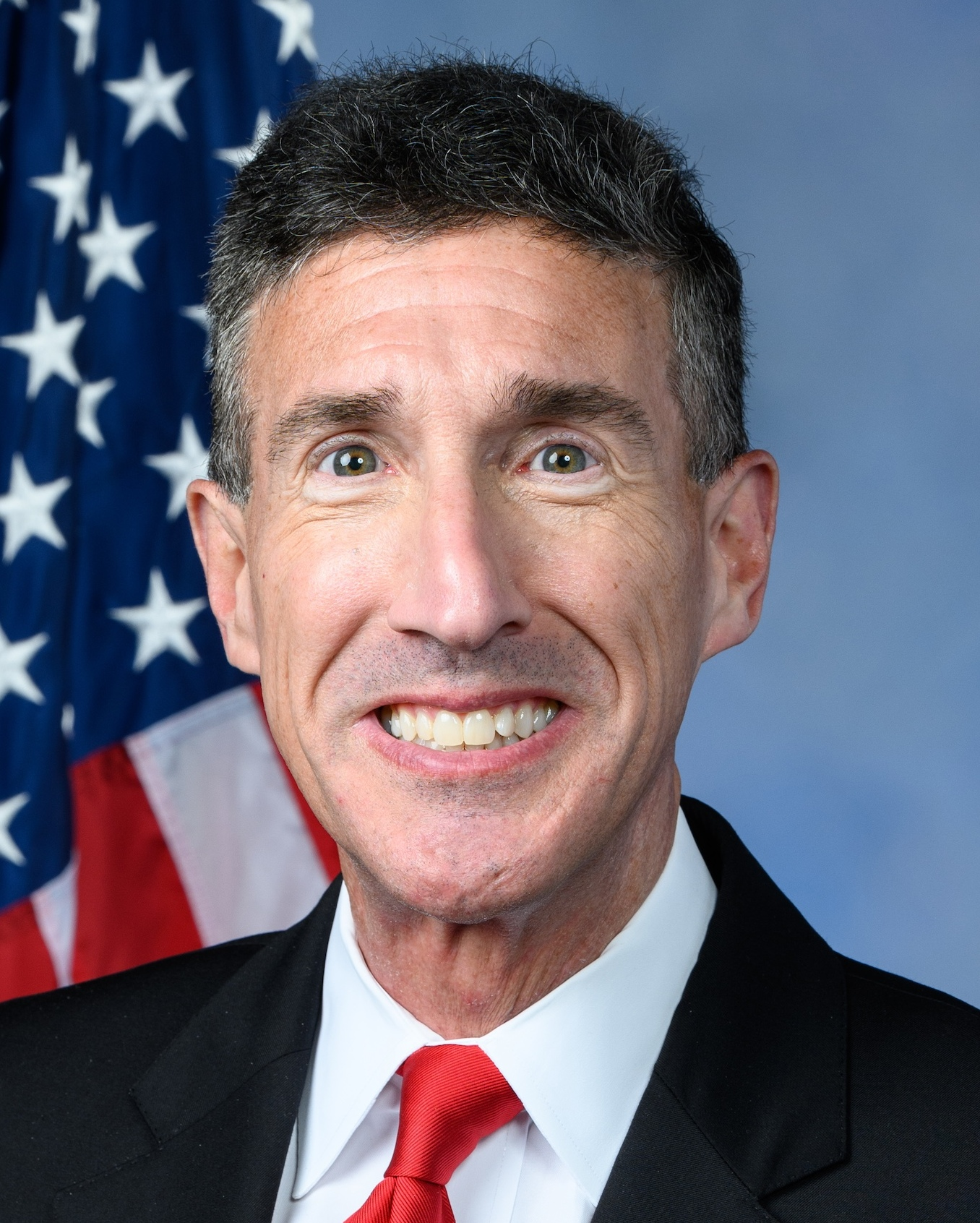

| Nominee | David Kustoff | Sarah Freeman |
| Party | Republican | Democratic |
| Popular vote | 240,411 | 85,043 |
| Percentage | 72.34% | 25.59% |
- County results Kustoff: 50–60% 60–70% 70–80% 80–90%
U.S. Representative before election
David Kustoff
Republican
Elected U.S. Representative
David Kustoff
Republican

The 8th district encompasses rural West Tennessee as well as taking in the eastern suburbs of Memphis, including Bartlett, Lakeland, Germantown, and Collierville, as well as the cities of Jackson, Paris, and Dyersburg. The incumbent was Republican David Kustoff, who was re-elected with 73.99% of the vote in 2022. He won re-election with 72.4% of the vote.

=== Republican primary ===
==== Nominee ====
- David Kustoff, incumbent U.S. representative

==== Disqualified ====
- George Flinn, former Shelby County commissioner and perennial candidate

==== Endorsements ====
David Kustoff

Executive branch officials

- Donald Trump, 45th president of the United States (2017–2021)

Organizations

- AIPAC
- Republican Jewish Coalition

==== Fundraising ====
Campaign finance reports as of December 31, 2024
| Candidate | Raised | Spent | Cash on hand |
|---|---|---|---|
| David Kustoff (R) | $2,498,789 | $1,599,322 | $2,059,461 |
Source: Federal Election Commission

==== Results ====
Republican primary results
| Party | Candidate | Votes | % |
|---|---|---|---|
| Republican | David Kustoff (incumbent) | 55,809 | 100.00% |
| Total votes | | 55,809 | 100.00% |

=== Democratic primary ===
==== Nominee ====
- Sarah Freeman, college professor

==== Eliminated in primary ====
- Leonard Perkins
- Lawrence Pivnick, law school professor and candidate for this district in 2014
- Lynnette Williams, physician and nominee for this district in 2022
- Brenda Woods, nonprofit executive

==== Results ====
Democratic primary results by county: Freeman: 30–40%; 40–50%; 50–60%; Woods: 20–30%; 30–40%; 40–50%; 60–70%; Perkins: 30–40%; Tie: 20–30%; 30–40%

Democratic primary results
| Party | Candidate | Votes | % |
|---|---|---|---|
| Democratic | Sarah Freeman | 5,552 | 33.73% |
| Democratic | Brenda Woods | 4,580 | 27.83% |
| Democratic | Lynnette Williams | 2,887 | 17.54% |
| Democratic | Leonard Perkins | 2,160 | 13.12% |
| Democratic | Lawrence Pivnick | 1,279 | 7.77% |
| Total votes | | 16,458 | 100.00% |

=== Independents ===
==== Declared ====
- James Hart, white supremacist, segregationist activist, realtor, perennial candidate, and Republican nominee for this district in 2004

=== General election ===
==== Predictions ====
| Source | Ranking | As of |
|---|---|---|
| The Cook Political Report | Solid R | February 2, 2023 |
| Inside Elections | Solid R | March 10, 2023 |
| Sabato's Crystal Ball | Safe R | February 23, 2023 |
| Elections Daily | Safe R | September 7, 2023 |
| CNalysis | Solid R | November 16, 2023 |

==== Results ====
2024 Tennessee's 8th congressional district election results
| Party | Candidate | Votes | % |
|---|---|---|---|
| Republican | David Kustoff (incumbent) | 240,411 | 72.34% |
| Democratic | Sarah Freeman | 85,043 | 25.59% |
| Independent | James Hart | 6,861 | 2.06% |
| Total votes | | 332,315 | 100.00% |
| Republican hold | | | |

==== By county ====
| County | David Kustoff Republican | | Sarah Freeman Democratic | | James Hart Independent | | Total votes |
| County | % | # | % | # | % | # | Total votes |
|---|---|---|---|---|---|---|---|
| Benton | 76.22% | 1,622 | 20.11% | 428 | 3.67% | 78 | 2,128 |
| Carroll | 81.39% | 9,427 | 16.17% | 1,873 | 2.43% | 282 | 11,582 |
| Chester | 83.57% | 6,100 | 14.59% | 1,065 | 1.84% | 134 | 7,299 |
| Crockett | 80.33% | 4,403 | 17.92% | 982 | 1.75% | 96 | 5,481 |
| Dyer | 81.64% | 10,841 | 16.32% | 2,167 | 2.04% | 271 | 13,279 |
| Fayette | 73.57% | 16,316 | 24.62% | 5,460 | 1.81% | 402 | 22,178 |
| Gibson | 77.61% | 15,658 | 20.22% | 4,079 | 2.17% | 437 | 20,174 |
| Hardeman | 62.54% | 5,584 | 35.18% | 3,141 | 2.28% | 204 | 8,929 |
| Hardin | 85.19% | 9,620 | 12.91% | 1,458 | 1.90% | 215 | 11,293 |
| Haywood | 50.92% | 3,296 | 47.60% | 3,081 | 1.48% | 96 | 6,473 |
| Henderson | 84.30% | 9,949 | 13.82% | 1,631 | 1.88% | 222 | 11,802 |
| Henry | 74.94% | 10,416 | 18.93% | 2,631 | 6.14% | 853 | 13,900 |
| Lake | 77.54% | 1,353 | 20.23% | 353 | 2.23% | 39 | 1,745 |
| Lauderdale | 70.71% | 5,387 | 27.30% | 2,080 | 1.98% | 151 | 7,618 |
| Madison | 61.25% | 23,133 | 36.73% | 13,874 | 2.02% | 762 | 37,769 |
| McNairy | 83.68% | 9,008 | 14.69% | 1,581 | 1.63% | 176 | 10,765 |
| Obion | 82.40% | 10,324 | 15.90% | 1,992 | 1.70% | 213 | 12,529 |
| Shelby | 66.88% | 68,202 | 31.45% | 32,073 | 1.66% | 1,697 | 101,972 |
| Tipton | 75.87% | 9,554 | 21.84% | 2,750 | 2.29% | 288 | 12,592 |
| Weakley | 79.78% | 10,218 | 18.30% | 2,344 | 1.91% | 245 | 12,807 |

== District 9 ==
2024 Tennessee's 9th congressional district election
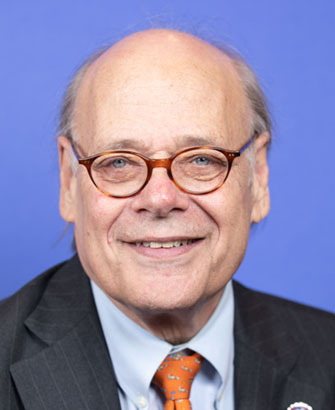

| Nominee | Steve Cohen | Charlotte Bergmann |
| Party | Democratic | Republican |
| Popular vote | 159,522 | 57,411 |
| Percentage | 71.31% | 25.66% |
- County results Cohen: 70–80% Bergmann: 70–80%
U.S. Representative before election
Steve Cohen
Democratic
Elected U.S. Representative
Steve Cohen
Democratic

The 9th district is based in Memphis. The incumbent was Democrat Steve Cohen, who was re-elected with 70.91% of the vote in 2022. He won re-election with 71.3% of the vote.

=== Democratic primary ===
==== Nominee ====
- Steve Cohen, incumbent U.S. representative

==== Eliminated in primary ====
- Marion Latroy Alexandria-Williams, businessman and perennial candidate
- Kasandra Smith, police officer and candidate for this district in 2018
- Corey Strong, former chair of the Shelby County Democratic Party and candidate for this district in 2020

==== Endorsements ====
Steve Cohen

Organizations

- Bend the Arc
- Feminist Majority PAC
- Humane Society Legislative Fund

Labor unions

- Association of Flight Attendants
- National Education Association

==== Fundraising ====
Campaign finance reports as of December 31, 2024
| Candidate | Raised | Spent | Cash on hand |
|---|---|---|---|
| Steve Cohen (D) | $703,466 | $432,301 | $1,648,598 |
Source: Federal Election Commission

==== Results ====
Democratic primary results by county: Cohen: 50–60%; 70–80%

Democratic primary results
| Party | Candidate | Votes | % |
|---|---|---|---|
| Democratic | Steve Cohen (incumbent) | 30,042 | 73.71% |
| Democratic | Corey Strong | 7,258 | 17.81% |
| Democratic | Marion Latroy Alexandria-Williams | 1,936 | 4.75% |
| Democratic | Kasandra Smith | 1,523 | 3.74% |
| Total votes | | 40,759 | 100.00% |

=== Republican primary ===
==== Nominee ====
- Charlotte Bergmann, businesswoman and nominee for this district in 2010, 2014, 2018, 2020, and 2022

==== Fundraising ====
Campaign finance reports as of December 31, 2024
| Candidate | Raised | Spent | Cash on hand |
|---|---|---|---|
| Charlotte Bergmann (R) | $57,469 (Note: At least $9,021 of this total was self-funded by Bergmann) | $47,462 | $3,441 |
Source: Federal Election Commission

==== Results ====
Republican primary results
| Party | Candidate | Votes | % |
|---|---|---|---|
| Republican | Charlotte Bergmann | 10,148 | 100.00% |
| Total votes | | 10,148 | 100.00% |

=== Independents ===
==== Declared ====
- William Wells

=== General election ===
==== Predictions ====
| Source | Ranking | As of |
|---|---|---|
| The Cook Political Report | Solid D | February 2, 2023 |
| Inside Elections | Solid D | March 10, 2023 |
| Sabato's Crystal Ball | Safe D | February 23, 2023 |
| Elections Daily | Safe D | September 7, 2023 |
| CNalysis | Solid D | November 16, 2023 |

==== Results ====
2024 Tennessee's 9th congressional district election results
| Party | Candidate | Votes | % |
|---|---|---|---|
| Democratic | Steve Cohen (incumbent) | 159,522 | 71.31% |
| Republican | Charlotte Bergman | 57,411 | 25.66% |
| Independent | William Wells | 3,708 | 1.66% |
| Independent | Dennis Clark | 3,062 | 1.37% |
| Total votes | | 223,703 | 100.00% |
| Democratic hold | | | |

==== By county ====
| County | Steve Cohen Democratic | | Charlotte Bergmann Republican | | Other votes | | Total votes |
| County | % | # | % | # | % | # | Total votes |
|---|---|---|---|---|---|---|---|
| Shelby | 74.01% | 157,018 | 22.96% | 48,706 | 3.03% | 6,427 | 212,151 |
| Tipton | 21.68% | 2,504 | 75.35% | 8,705 | 2.97% | 343 | 11,552 |

== See also ==
- Elections in Tennessee
- Political party strength in Tennessee
- Tennessee Democratic Party
- Tennessee Republican Party
- Government of Tennessee
- 2024 United States presidential election in Tennessee
- 2024 Tennessee elections
- 2024 United States elections
