= List of awards and nominations received by Junoon =

Junoon awards and nominations
- Junoon performing live at the Channel V Music Awards in 1998.
Awards and nominations
Award	Wins	Nominations
Lux Style Awards	0	1
ARY The Musik Awards	0	1
Channel V Awards	1	3
Indus Music Awards	1	4
BBC Asian Awards	1	1
ARY Asian/Bollywood Awards	1	5
Sahara Awards	0	2
MPAC's Annual Media Awards	1	1
SAJA Awards	1	1
UNESCO	1	0

Totals (Note: Certain award groups do not simply award one winner. They acknowledge several different recipients, have runners-up, and have third place. Since this is a specific recognition and is different from losing an award, runner-up mentions are considered wins in this award tally. For simplification and to avoid errors, each award in this list has been presumed to have had a prior nomination.)
- Wins: 7
- Nominations: 19

This is a list of awards and nominations for Junoon, a Pakistani sufi rock band, formed in 1990 by lead guitarist Salman Ahmad. The band has released seven studio albums: Junoon (1991), Talaash (1993), Inquilaab (1996), Azadi (1997), Parvaaz (1999), Andaz (2001), and Dewaar (2003). All of the albums have been released through EMI. As one of the most commercially successful sufi rock bands of all time, Junoon have sold over 30 million albums worldwide.

After several of their albums topped the Pakistani Music Charts, one of their albums, Azadi, received a Channel V Awards nomination for the "Best International Album" in 1998. Also, Junoon were awarded "The Best International Group Award" at the Channel V Awards and they received an award for their "Contribution to Asian Culture" at the BBC Asian Awards. In 1999, UNESCO presented them with an award for their "Outstanding Achievements in Music and Peace" as they were invited to perform at the Music for Peace concert held in Paris, France. In 2002, the band was nominated for the "Best Music Act" at the Lux Style Awards. In 2004 at the Indus Music Awards, Junoon seventh studio album, Dewaar, was nominated for the "Best Album" along with single "Pappu Yaar" from the album being nominated for the "Best Music Video" and "Best Song" awards. Also, Junoon were awarded the "Best Band Award". Later the same year, Junoon seventh studio album was again nominated for the "Best Album" and singles, "Garaj Baras" and "Pappu Yaar", were nominated for the "Best Song" and "Best Music Video" at the ARY Asian/Bollywood Awards held in Dubai, UAE. In the same year, Junoon's single "Garaj Baras" was nominated for "Best Soundtrack" and "Best Song" awards at the Sahara Awards as being part of the Indian film Paap, and also, South Asian Journalists Association awarded Junoon for the "Outstanding story on South Asia - Broadcast Award". In 2006, at ARY The Musik Awards the band was nominated for the "Best Live Act". Later the same year, Junoon won "The Muslim Public Affairs Council Annual Media Award". Overall, Junoon have received seven awards from nineteen nominations.

== Lux Style Awards ==
The Lux Style Awards are the Pakistani Phonographic Industry's annual awards. The Lux Style Awards is considered one of the nation's premier award show events. The awards have been dubbed "Pakistan's Oscars" and described as "'the' awards ceremony in Pakistan."

Year	Category	Nominated work	Result
2002	Best Music Act		Nominated

== The Musik Awards ==
Year	Category	Nominated work	Result
2006	Best Live Act (Band)		Nominated

== Indus Music Awards ==
Indus Music Awards are regarded as the first music awards show in Pakistan. Junoon have been nominated thrice and have won one award.

Year	Category	Nominated work	Result
2004	Best Album	Dewaar	Nominated
2004	Best Rock Song	"Pappu Yaar"	Nominated
2004	Best Music Video	"Pappu Yaar"	Nominated
2004	Best Band		Won

== Channel V Awards ==
Channel V declared the "Best International Group Award" to Junoon among Aqua, Boyzone, The Prodigy and Backstreet Boys.

Year	Category	Nominated work	Result
1998	Best International Album	Azadi	Nominated
1998	Best International Song	"Sayonee"	Nominated
1998	Best International Group	-	Won

== Other awards ==
=== ARY Asian/Bollywood Awards ===
Year	Category	Nominated work	Result
2004	Best Album	Dewaar	Nominated
2004	Best Song	"Garaj Baras"	Nominated
2004	Best Music Video	"Pappu Yaar"	Nominated
2004	Best Band Award		Nominated
2004	Special Award	Award for Building Bridges between India and Pakistan	Won

=== Sahara Awards ===
Year	Category	Nominated work	Result
2004	Best Soundtrack	"Garaj Baras" from the Bollywood movie Paap	Nominated
2004	Best Song	"Garaj Baras"	Nominated

=== BBC Asian Awards ===
BBC Asian Awards are an annual award ceremony by BBC. It is regarded as the largest Asian festival outside of South Asia. In 1998, Junoon headlined the BBC Mega Mela and were awarded for their "Contribution to Asian Culture" by BBC at London, United Kingdom.

Year	Category	Nominated work	Result
1998	Contribution to Asian Culture	-	Won

=== South Asian Journalists Association Awards ===
Year	Category	Nominated work	Result
2004	Outstanding story on South Asia - Broadcast	BBC Documentary: "The Rock Star and the Mullahs"	Won

=== The Muslim Public Affairs Council Annual Media Awards ===
Year	Category	Nominated work	Result
2006	MPAC's Media Award		Won

=== Other achievements ===
- Outstanding Achievements in Music and Peace by UNESCO
- Salman Ahmad named "Goodwill Ambassador" of Pakistan by United Nations
