= It's My Country Too: Muslim Americans =

- Directed by: Clifford Bestall
- Produced by: Ruhi Hamid
- Starring: Salman Ahmad; Junoon
- Cinematography: Duncan Russell
- Edited by: Karen O'Connor; Film editor: Ashley Smith
- Music by: Junoon
- Distributed by: BBC; October Films
- Release date: March 15, 2005 (UK)
- Running time: 58 minutes
- Countries: Pakistan; United Kingdom; United States
- Languages: Urdu; English

It's My Country Too: Muslim Americans is a 2005 documentary film directed by Clifford Bestall and produced by Ruhi Hamid. The film follows the journey of the South Asian rock music band Junoon during their tours of America and the lives of Salman Ahmad, Muslims in the United States, and the Muslims for Bush pressure group.

On March 3, 2005, the documentary aired on BBC television strand This World.

== Synopsis ==
The film follows the journey of the Pakistani rock star Salman Ahmad, a US citizen of Pakistani origin, asking fellow Muslims what it is like to be Muslim in post-9/11 United States.

In the run-up to Election Day, Ahmad tours the US, performing with his band Junoon and talking to American Muslims. More than half the world’s Muslim population lives in the western world, which testifies to the fact that there is no "clash of civilisations". In fact, Islam is more in tune with the Republican than the Democratic Party as 55% of American Muslims vote Republican. But, since September 11, Muslims have been victims of a constant barrage of media insinuation, and even outright attacks on Islam and its adherents. Will this change the way they vote?

Under attack, Muslims have been forced into making choices. Previously apolitical Muslims have come to realise that they can no longer sit on the fence. Salman talks to wealthy, conservative Arabs and Pakistanis, who have donated huge sums to the Republican Campaign. He also sees victims of racial profiling and The Patriot Act, and those who abhor the war in Iraq, take to the streets on behalf of the Democrats.

Salman concludes that the perceived clash of cultures between the Western world and Islam is in fact a split deep in the American psyche. While the Muslim community is finding its identity, America is fighting for its very soul.

== See also ==
- List of cultural references to the September 11 attacks
