= Republican Muslim Coalition =

American Muslim advocacy group

- Formation: 2012; 14 years ago
- Founder: Saba Ahmed
- Legal status: 501(c)(4) nonprofit organization
- Purpose: Muslim activism
- Region served: United States
- President: Saba Ahmed
- Website: Official website

The Republican Muslim Coalition (RMC), is an American Muslim political advocacy group established in 2012. RMC works to build ties between the American Muslim community and the Republican Party in the United States and elevate American Muslim voices in American Politics. The founder and president of RMC is lawyer Saba Ahmed.

== History ==
The founder and president of RMC, Saba Ahmed, left the Democratic Party in 2011. She has stated that the Republican Muslim Coalition in 2012 after finding that many of her views, such as her stance against abortion rights and her support for low taxes, were consistent with the traditional Republican platforms. At the same time, she has acknowledged the challenge of Islamophobia within the Republican Party.

In 2015, the RMC called for tougher action against the Islamic State following the November 2015 Paris attacks, insisting that the group did not represent Islam. Following President Donald Trump's proposal for a "total and complete shutdown" of Muslims entering the United States, Ahmed challenged Trump to attend an Islamic prayer service at a mosque.

In 2016, Ahmed urged Muslim Americans to vote Republican. In 2017, she said she was "deeply hurt by Donald Trump's ignorant views of Islam."

== Political context ==
=== George W. Bush presidency ===
Six days after the September 11 attacks, President Bush made a public appearance at Washington, D.C.'s largest Islamic Center where he acknowledged the "incredibly valuable contribution" of American Muslims and called for them "to be treated with respect". Numerous incidents of harassment and hate crimes against Muslims and South Asians were reported in the days following the attacks. On national television, Bush quoted from the Qur'an and worked to assure Americans that the vast majority of Muslims are peaceful.

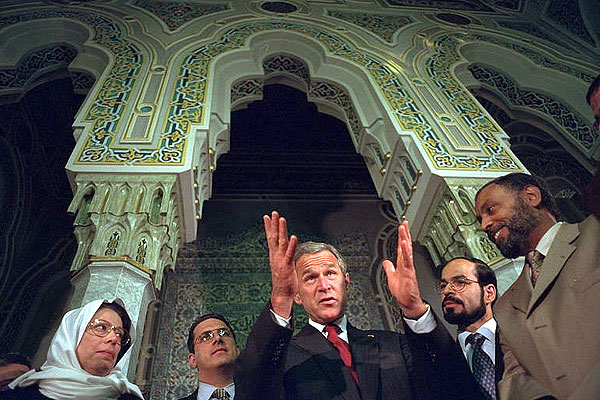
President George W. Bush at the Islamic Center of Washington, D.C.

=== Trump presidency ===
During the 2024 United States presidential election, Donald Trump reached out to Muslim and Arab-American communities in Michigan as part of his bid for re-election as president of the United States. A major motive for Michigan's Muslim leaders to endorse Trump was his commitment to bring peace to the Middle East, particularly in Lebanon, the Gaza Strip, and the Palestinian territories of West Bank and East Jerusalem.

== Republican Muslim vote ==
In the 2000 Presidential election, 78 percent of Muslim Americans supported Republican candidate George W. Bush over Democratic candidate Al Gore. However, due to the wars that took place in Afghanistan and in Iraq, and due to what has been perceived as increased anti-Muslim rhetoric from the Republican Party after the September 11 attacks, support for the Republican Party among American Muslims has declined sharply.

By 2004, Bush's Muslim support had been reduced to under 1%, and Democratic candidate John Kerry's support rose to 93%, with 5% voting for Ralph Nader.

According to a 2018 poll from the Institute for Social Policy and Understanding, American Muslims were as satisfied with the American trajectory as the general public, reporting at around 27%. Regarding the 45th president of the United States, Donald Trump, Muslims are the least likely to approve of him across all faith groups including non affiliated Americans. This is particularly due to the deeply unpopular policies like recognizing Jerusalem as the capital of Israel and the Muslim travel ban (Executive order 13769).

During the 2024 United States presidential election, An August 2024 survey published by the Council on American-Islamic Relations (CAIR) found that in Michigan, 40 percent of Muslim voters supported Stein, 18% supported Trump and 12% supported Harris. In CAIR's exit poll, published on November 8th, 53% of Muslims voted for the Green Party candidate, Jill Stein. Only 20% of Muslims voted for Harris and only 21% voted for Trump.

Republican Muslim vote by presidential election
Election year	Republican
2000	78%
2004	<1%
2008	2%
2012	4%
2016	13%
2020	19%
2024	21%

== See also ==
- Muslims for America
- Council on American–Islamic Relations
- Islam in the United States
- Republican Hindu Coalition
- Republican Jewish Coalition
- White House Iftar dinner
