= Sriyanka Ray =

Brooklyn based TV producer

Sriyanka Ray was a New York Emmy Award–winning Indian television producer and journalist based in Brooklyn with 12 Emmy Nominations.

== Awards ==
- Ray's very first New York Emmy Awards nomination was in 2016 after that she won New York Emmy Awards in the year 2018 till date she has totally bagged 10+ wins and nomination of New York Emmy Awards.
- Ray won the South Asian Journalists Association award for a short documentary called Sweatshop of Wall Street
- Socially Relevant Film Festival New York for Highway Mike

== Death ==
Her cause of death is still undisclosed.
