= Fred de Sam Lazaro =

American TV journalist and documentarian

- Born: July 21, 1956 (age 70); Bengaluru, India
- Education: College of Marin; College of St. Scholastica
- Occupation: Journalist
- Years active: 1980-present
- Known for: PBS NewsHour
- Spouse: Kay de Sam Lazaro
- Children: 3

Fred de Sam Lazaro (born July 21, 1956) is an American television journalist, best known for his work on the PBS NewsHour. He is one of the program's two longest-serving correspondents, (Note: Judy Woodruff’s tenure began in 1983; she was not associated with the program while at CNN from 1993 to 2005, returning in 2006.) having joined it in 1985, the same year as Paul Solman.

== Early life and education ==
De Sam Lazaro was born in Bengaluru, India, the youngest of 12 children. His parents were Bernardino and Alda de Sam Lazaro of Goa, which during their time there was within the Portuguese State of India.

Bernardino de Sam Lazaro was a musician, piano manufacturer and music store owner in Shanghai, whose eldest six children were from his first marriage to Alda's sister Esmerelda; a prominent figure among Portuguese expatriates in Shanghai, he served on a relief commission assisting Portuguese nationals during the Second Sino-Japanese War. Alda (née da Silva) was a medical doctor who during their time in China devoted herself to raising the family's (then) nine children. They lived in the Shanghai French Concession.

When his father's businesses were nationalized after the Chinese Communist Revolution, de Sam Lazaro's mother took the children to India and established a medical practice in order to support them. His father, who had been detained by the new government for his capitalist leanings, reunited with the family in Bengaluru a year later.

They built a home in Bengaluru's central Cooke Town neighborhood and had three more children. His mother operated a maternity clinic next door to their home. De Sam Lazaro, whose father was 68 years old at the time of his birth, has described his adolescent self as a "somewhat reserved" and "underachieving" student at a conservative evangelical Christian school, whose family were "strictly observant" Roman Catholics.

1n 1975 he and his mother immigrated to the United States, joining one of his sisters in the San Francisco Bay Area three years after his father's death. The following year he met his future wife, Kay Drechsler, who was working as an au pair during a gap year in Marin County, while he was a student at the College of Marin. He joined her in her native northern Minnesota in 1979, enrolling along with her at the College of St. Scholastica in Duluth, where he earned a degree in media arts in 1981.

== Early career ==
An internship at a radio station based on the St. Scholastica campus, WSCD — an affiliate of Minnesota Public Radio — led to a full-time job there. His radio reports brought him to the attention of Jim Russell at Twin Cities Public Television, who recruited him for its new public affairs series Almanac. After a brief stint on that show, de Sam Lazaro began working in TPT's new bureau for the recently expanded McNeil/Lehrer NewsHour.

== PBS NewsHour ==
De Sam Lazaro has reported for the NewsHour on a broad range of topics — frequently on poverty and issues related to it, as well as on healthcare, South Asia, and matters pertaining to Minnesota and the Upper Midwest. Notable figures he has interviewed include the Dalai Lama, Desmond Tutu, Jimmy Carter, and Leonard Peltier.

Jim Lehrer, who anchored the program during the first 25 years of de Sam Lazaro's tenure there, praised him as "the ultimate professional", saying "he works hard, he works fast and he works fair."

Since 2006, his reports have been produced under the auspices of the Under-Told Stories Project — of which he is founder and executive director, and which is based at the University of St. Thomas.

=== International reporting ===
A prime focus of the Under-Told Stories Project is living conditions for the poor in developing nations and the work of those making efforts to improve them. De Sam Lazaro has said that the global nature of his work began when he would file stories about his country of origin while vacationing there, demonstrating to NewsHour producers that he could do high-quality reporting for them from India "for a fraction of the normal cost because I could function as a native and was well-networked."

De Sam Lazaro and his associates have reported from 70 countries. In 2004, he and his team were the first American television crew to report from Sudan on the War in Darfur.

A longtime beat for him was AIDS — in particular, the impact and treatment of it in the developing world — which he reported on for two decades, including during his time as the NewsHour's medical correspondent from 1993 to 1995.

=== Coverage of social and labor unrest in Minnesota ===
The first NewsHour story assigned to de Sam Lazaro was the 1985 Hormel meatpackers' strike, considered one of the most significant, protracted and contentious American labor actions that decade. He returned to the Austin plant and headquarters of Hormel in 2025 for a piece on the strike's 40th anniversary.

He was a primary correspondent for the program in its coverage of the murder of George Floyd and its aftermath, filing more than two dozen reports on Floyd's death and the unrest it spurred; the trial and conviction of Derek Chauvin; local protests following the killing of Daunte Wright in a Minneapolis suburb during the trial; and police reform efforts in the Twin Cities area related to those events.

De Sam Lazaro also extensively covered Operation Metro Surge for the NewsHour, with more than a dozen reports in 2025 and 2026 on Department of Homeland Security immigration actions in Minnesota and their impact on its residents — including those in the Somali community — and on the killings by Federal agents of nonimmigrant U.S. citizens Renée Good and Alex Pretti.

== Other work ==
In addition to the NewsHour, de Sam Lazaro has contributed to other PBS programs. He was a correspondent and substitute host for Religion and Ethics Newsweekly, and directed two documentaries for Wide Angle: "Democracy in the Rough" (2006), about the first free elections after decades of dictatorship in the Democratic Republic of the Congo, and "The Dying Fields" (2007), which examined an epidemic of suicide among farmers in the Vidarbha region of central India.

In the 1990s and 2000s, he served as a producer of local programs including NewsNight Minnesota for Twin Cities Public Television. He has written occasional opinion pieces — often drawing on his own perspective as an Indian American and immigrant — for the Minnesota Star Tribune.

== Awards, honors and public service ==
=== Awards ===
Year	Nominated work	Category	Award	Result	Notes	Ref.
2002	Seth Eastman: Painting the Dakota	Bronze Wrangler	Western Heritage Awards	Won	Executive producer, for Twin Cities Public Television; shared with producer/director Kristian Berg and narrator Peter Coyote	
2003	Stem Cell Research	Outstanding Story	SAJA Journalism Awards	Won	For Religion and Ethics Newsweekly	
2008	The Dying Fields	Professional News Analysis	CINE Golden Eagle Awards	Won	For Wide Angle	
2011	In Middle East, Coalition Tries to Ease Tension over Water	Outstanding Single Story	Society of Environmental Journalists Awards	Won	For PBS NewsHour	
2015	Rwanda Genocide: 20 Years	First Place, Television News Magazine Religion Reporting	Excellence in Religious Reporting Awards	Won	For Religion and Ethics Newsweekly	
2025	Toxic Trifecta	Outstanding Climate, Environment and Weather Coverage	News and Documentary Emmy Awards	Nominated	Two-part NewsHour report about the dumping of junk cars, electronic waste and used clothing by the West in Ghana	
2026	Immigration Crackdown	News	Peabody Awards	Won	Contributed segments on Operation Metro Surge to ongoing NewsHour coverage of tightening U.S. Federal immigration enforcement	
2026	Cuts & Consequences	Outstanding Continuing Coverage: Short Form	News and Documentary Emmy Awards	Nominated	Contributed segment on funding cuts for tuberculosis prevention and treatment in Bangladesh to ongoing NewsHour coverage of the shutdown of USAID	

=== Honors ===
De Sam Lazaro holds honorary doctorates from institutions including Arcadia University and St. John's University; he has also served as commencement speaker at St. John's, as well as at Carleton College

He has been a Knight-Wallace Fellow at the University of Michigan; a Kaiser Media Fellow; a Senior Distinguished Fellow at the St. Mary's University of Minnesota's Hendrickson Institute for Ethical Leadership; and a frequent grantee of the Pulitzer Center.

=== Public service ===
De Sam Lazaro has served on the boards of MinnPost, the Children's Law Center of Minnesota, the Asian American Journalists Association and the South Asian Association for Leaders of Tomorrow, and as a trustee of his alma mater, the College of St. Scholastica.

== Personal life ==
Fred and Kay de Sam Lazaro live in the Highland Park neighborhood of St. Paul, Minnesota and have three adult children.

An impromptu conversation in 1992 with staff at a Minneapolis music store about his father's career as a piano maker led to his locating, six years later, a Lazaro upright built by him, which he bought and had shipped from Shanghai to Minnesota.
