= Ruhi Hamid =

British filmmaker

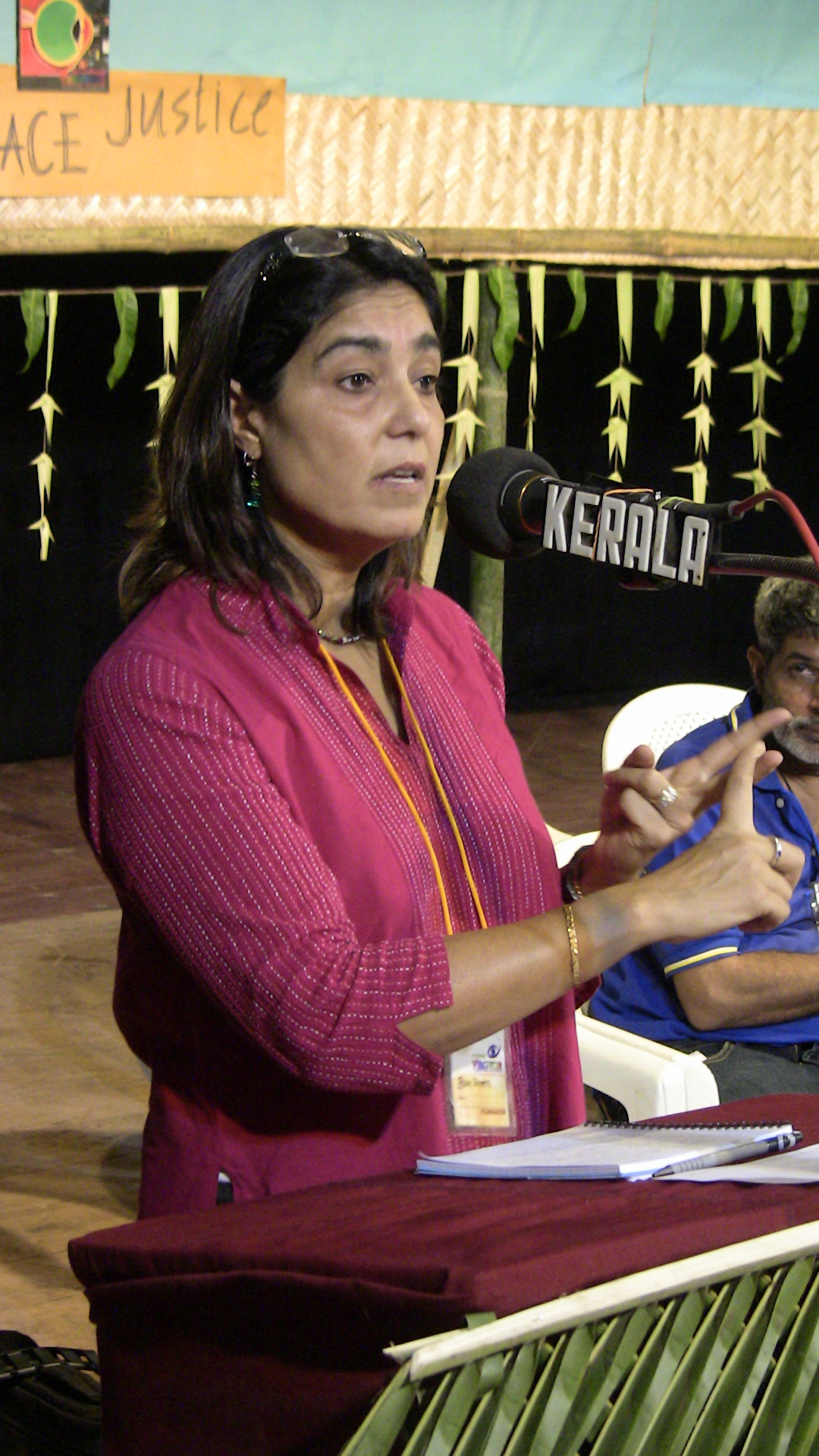
- Hamid speaking at ViBGYOR Film Festival, 2010
- Born: Mwanza, Tanzania
- Education: Middlesex Polytechnic; Royal College of Art
- Occupation: Filmmaker
- Notable work: The Rock Star and the Mullahs (2003); Women, Weddings, War and Me (2010)
- Partner: Misha Maltsev
- Awards: Rory Peck Award

Ruhi Hamid is a British filmmaker, born in Tanzania of Asian origin, who has made award-winning documentaries for the BBC, Channel 4, Al Jazeera International, and other UK, US and European broadcasters. Her films have covered international stories — in Africa, Asia, Europe, South America, the USA, and the Middle East — dealing with social and political issues about women religion, poverty, health, and human rights. A graduate of London's Royal College of Art, she is also a graphic designer.

== Biography ==
=== Early years ===
Ruhi Hamid was born in Mwanza, Tanzania, to Indian Muslim parents, and moved to England at the age of 12. After earning a BA in Information Graphics from Middlesex Polytechnic in 1980, she attended London's Royal College of Art, and on graduating worked as a graphic designer: in the Netherlands with the influential Studio Dumbar, in Zimbabwe as part of a collective of young black designers and photographers, the Maviyane Project, and in London at the BBC for several years.

=== Film career ===
She began her filmmaking career with the BBC's Community Programme Unit on the BAFTA award-winning series Video Diaries and Video Nation, before leaving in May 2000 to work as a freelance producer/director. For her debut as a freelance, she gained unprecedented access to the Pakistani criminal courts to make the three-part Channel 4 series Lahore Law (2002), which was nominated for a Grierson Award. Specialising as a solo director/camerawoman, often at significant personal risk, she went on to make other well regarded films for the BBC, Channel 4, Arte and Al Jazeera International, including Women and Islam (2004), The Rockstar and the Mullahs (2003), and Women, Weddings, War and Me (featuring Nelufar Hedayat, 2010). Hamid has also collaborated with prominent broadcasters including Jonathan Dimbleby and BBC Three's Reggie Yates.

Her films have been described as "informative journeys into the world of people and their cultures", her projects having included documentaries about the Hmong people trapped in the jungle of Laos (she filmed the first ever footage of their plight and went on to campaign on their behalf at the United Nations, the US State Department and at the EU Commission in Brussels), farmers in China, New Orleans in the aftermath of Hurricane Katrina, gang crime and violence in Cape Flats, South Africa, and At the Epicentre, a film on the aftermath of the Asian tsunami in Banda Aceh, Indonesia, that won the Rory Peck Award in 2005. She has also campaigned through video for greater awareness of people with HIV/AIDS in rural India.

According to ESPN,

"Hamid's empathy and gift for understanding the ordinary person has enabled her to gain access to peoples, cultures and institutions around the world, including the Amazonian Indians, Shamans in the Siberian forests, refugees in Uganda, women in Afghanistan and the British Foreign & Commonwealth office in Pakistan. Hamid is able to work with children and old people alike and turn her skills to more populist programmes working with rock stars, untried and professional presenters and celebrities like Michael Palin on a film about transport, explorer Benedict Allen, newscaster Samira Ahmed, the food writer and broadcaster Stefan Gates and more recently a film in a three-part series on Africa with Jonathan Dimbleby.
Hamid's interest lies primarily in telling intimate human stories of people caught up in complex political or social conditions in our world today. She has a talent for gaining the trust and collaboration of those sensitive and suspicious of the media.... Her documentaries are always character driven with strong narratives."

Together with her partner Misha Maltsev, also a film and music professional, she runs Partisan Films.

=== Selected filmography ===
Year	Title	Duration
2015	Reggie Yates: Race Riots USA	(60 mins)
2015	Mexico's Baby Business, Unreported World	(60 mins)
2015	Reggie Yates' Extreme Russia: Teen Model Factory	(60 mins)
2014	Pharmageddon	(60 mins)
2013	Reggie Yates's Extreme South Africa: Knife Crime ER	(55 mins)
2013	Return to Somalia: Aliya's Story	(30 mins)
2013	L'Arbitre	(08 mins)
2012	An African Journey with Jonathan Dimbleby	(60 mins)
2011	Breaking into Britain, Panorama	(60 mins)
2010	Women, Weddings, War and Me	(60 mins)
2010	Child Slavery	
2007	Inside a Shariah Court	(59 mins)
2006	The Hurricane That Shook America	
2006	The Governor, Back to School & Looking Good	
2005	At the Epicentre - Post Tsunami Aceh	(50 mins)
2005	Living Positive	
2005	It's My Country Too: Muslim Americans	(58 mins)
2004	Frontlines Laos	(30 mins)
2004	Women and Islam: Islam Unveiled	(88 mins)
2003	The Rock Star and the Mullahs	(56 mins)
2000	Lahore Law: A Suitable Husband, Episode 3	(50 mins)
2000	Lahore Law: Illicit Affair, Episode 2	(50 mins)
2000	Lahore Law: Murder at the Shrine, Episode 1	(50 mins)
1999	The Bones of Colonel Fawcett	

== Awards ==
- 2004: "Outstanding story on South Asia - Broadcast" award from the South Asian Journalists Association for The Rock Star and the Mullahs
- 2005: Rory Peck Award for At the Epicentre - Post Tsunami Aceh
- 2010: Shortlisted for Grierson Award (Women, Weddings, War and Me)
- 2014: Finalist in Rory Peck Awards (Knife Crime ER)
