= Victoria Broderick =

American politician

Member-elect of the U.S. House of Representatives from Tennessee's 4th district
- Assuming office January 3, 2027
- Succeeding: Scott DesJarlais

Personal details
- Born: 1991 or 1992 (age 34–35) Tampa, Florida, U.S.
- Party: Democratic
- Spouse: Nick Hamner
- Children: 2
- Education: Austin Peay State University (BA)
- Website: Campaign website

Victoria Isabel Broderick (born 1991 or 1992) is an American politician who is the member-elect of the United States House of Representatives for Tennessee's 4th congressional district. A member of the Democratic Party, she narrowly defeated Scott DesJarlais in an upset in the 2026 election.

Broderick served as county chair of Lincoln County, Tennessee, from 2022 to 2025. She is a member of the Tennessee Democratic Party executive committee.

== Early life and education ==
Broderick was born in Tampa, Florida, and earned a bachelor's degree in communications from Austin Peay State University. She worked as a tech support staffer before her election to Congress in 2026.

== Political career ==
Broderick first ran for Congress in 2024 in the 4th district, citing the Supreme Court's overturning of Roe v. Wade as a motivator for her involvement in politics. She lost to DesJarlais, 70%–26%.

In the 2026 Democratic primary after Tennessee underwent redistricting, Broderick won despite being heavily outspent by Nashville City Councilman Mike Cortese. She narrowly defeated DesJarlais in the general election in an upset.

== Personal life ==
Broderick has two sons. She is married to Nick Hamner and has attention deficit hyperactivity disorder (ADHD). She is a member of the LGBTQ community. She suffered a miscarriage in 2023; the experience and the passage of anti-abortion legislation in Tennessee motivated her involvement in politics.

== Electoral history ==
Tennessee's 4th Congressional District General Election, 2024
| Party | Candidate | Votes | % |
|---|---|---|---|
| Republican | Scott DesJarlais (incumbent) | 219,133 | 69.95 |
| Democratic | Victoria Broderick | 83,832 | 26.76 |
| Independent | Keith Nolan | 5,601 | 1.79 |
| Independent | Earnest Ensley | 4,689 | 1.50 |
| Total votes | | 313,255 | 100.00 |

U.S. House of Representatives
| Preceded by Scott DesJarlais | Member of the U.S. House of Representatives from Tennessee's 4th congressional district Taking office 2027 | Elect |
