= The Rock Star and the Mullahs =

2003 Pakistani documentary film

- Written by: Edward Atkins; Kathryn Cochran; Elizabeth Goodman; Daniel Greenberg; Suzane Guthrie; Jeremy Hindsdale; Michael Hutchinson; Ariel Jacobs; Antonia Konkoly; Adrienne Kupper; Traci Osterhagen; John Uhl
- Directed by: Ruhi Hamid; Angus MacQueen
- Starring: Junoon
- Narrated by: Jay O. Sanders
- Theme music composer: Doug Johnson; Fiona McBain
- Country of origin: Pakistan
- Original languages: Urdu; English

Production
- Producer: Pamela Friedman
- Cinematography: Scott Sinkler
- Editors: Mark Sutton; Jay Slot
- Running time: 100 minutes

Original release
- Network: BBC
- Release: 17 July 2003

The Rock Star and the Mullahs is a 2003 documentary film directed by Ruhi Hamid and Angus MacQueen and by producer Pamela Friedman. The film follows the journey of the South Asian rock music band Junoon and addresses music in Islam. The film won the "Outstanding story on South Asia - Broadcast" award at the South Asian Journalists Association Awards.

On 17 July 2003, BBC aired the documentary on the television programme Wide Angle.

== Synopsis ==
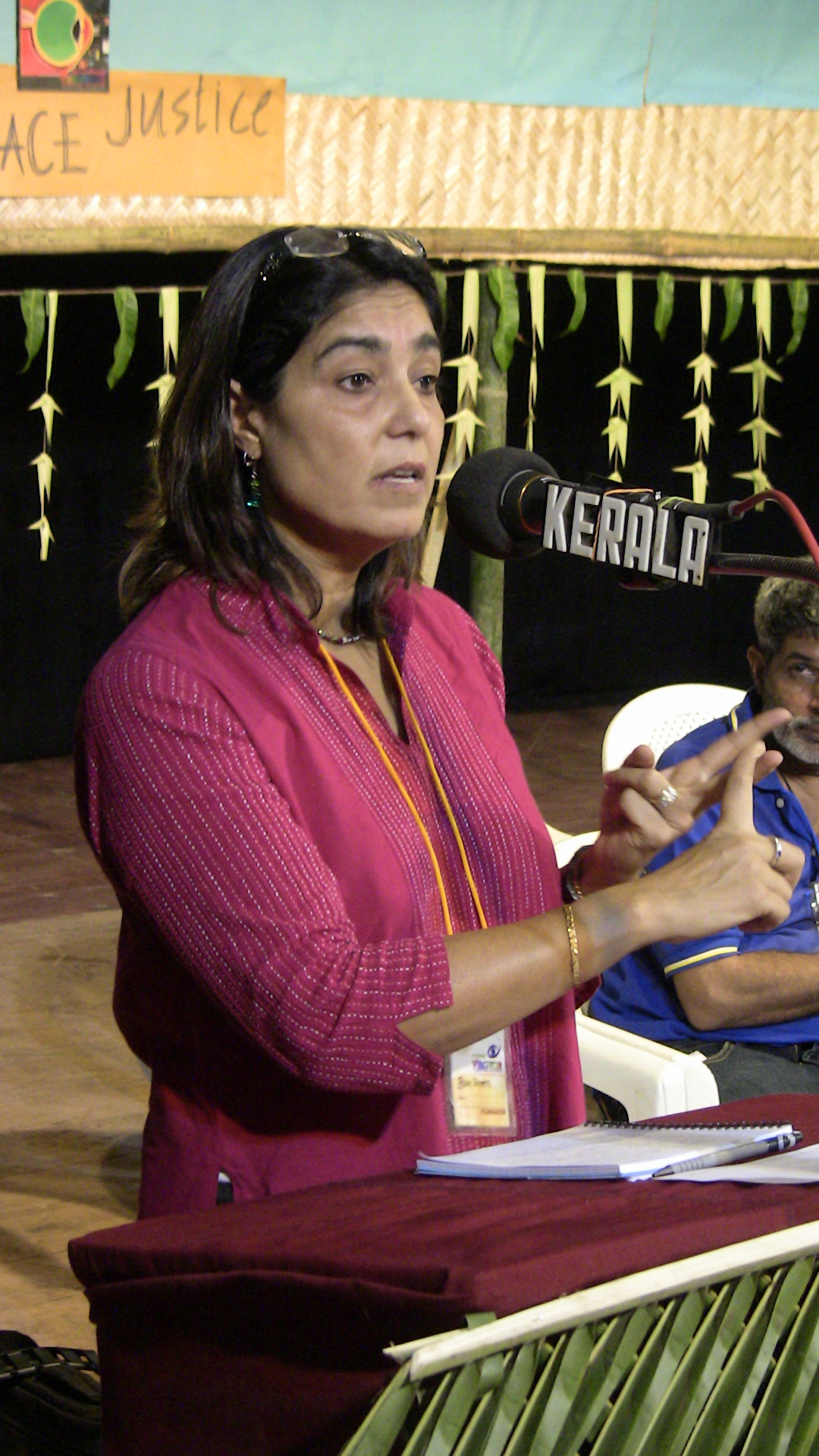
One of the directors Ruhi Hamid.

The film follows the journey of rock music band Junoon and focuses on music in Islam. Salman Ahmad, lead guitarist, travels throughout Pakistan in search of an answer from the clerics: "Where in Islam does it say that music is forbidden?". His journey takes him to affectionate fans and fiery preachers.

A public ban on music gradually takes an effect in Pakistan's Khyber Pakhtunkhwa, after a radical alliance of right-wing religious parties gains power in local elections. Several music and film stores are closed, musicians have been harassed and vigilantes routinely tear down posters and torch tapes, decrying them as "un-Islamic". But in the town of Peshawar, near the Afghan border, an encounter with a bus-load of Pashtuns showed Salman Ahmad how the masses are still in thrall to music. Salman Ahmad is mobbed by men who ask for his autograph and then start singing the tune with which his band hit the big time - "Jazba-e-Junoon". When Ahmad asks them why they think the provincial government has banned music, he is told "They want to listen to music themselves, they just don't want us to have it."

At a religious ceremony in Peshawar, all the young mullahs are aware of Ahmad and his famous band. But they are unable to tell him why music has been banned and are distinctly displeased when he sings a few verses from the Quran to the accompaniment of a guitar. As the film proceeds, Ahmad also meet the maverick preacher, Maulana Bijli, a critic of Western powers, weak Muslim governments and pop music. The Maulana is not convinced by Ahmad's argument that music should no more be banned in Pakistan than in 52 other Muslim countries.

Ahmad then meets Gulzar Alam, a traditional Pashtun musician who has first-hand experience of the authorities' crackdown on song. Ahmad sees the ban on music as part of his battle between Islamic extremists like those who rule the Khyber Pakhtunkhwa Province and "moderate modernists" such as himself.

As Ahmad's meeting with Maulana Bijli draws to a close, the firebrand cleric pats him on the hand and expresses the hope that he hasn't caused offence and that the two men will, one day, meet again. And then, with the instruction to "play this for them in London," Maulana Bijli bursts into song - a song of religious devotion, but melodious nonetheless.

== Reception ==
The Rock Star and the Mullahs aired on 17 July 2003 on BBC in United Kingdom. It went on to screen at various film festivals, winning numerous awards, including:

- "Outstanding story on South Asia - Broadcast" award at the South Asian Journalists Association Awards, 2004.
