= Republican Hindu Coalition =

Hindu-American interest group

The Republican Hindu Coalition is a Hindu-American interest group in the United States that "was founded in 2015 to be the unique bridge between the Hindu-American community and Republican policymakers and leaders."

Shalabh Kumar was inspired by the Republican Jewish Coalition to create RHC. RHC has offered $25 billion to support the Mexico–United States border wall. The organization also supports a merit-based immigration system to allow "children of high-skilled workers awaiting green cards to be granted legal permanent residency immediately."

== See also ==
- Republican Jewish Coalition
- Republican Muslim Coalition
