= Grant Starrett =

American politician

- Education: Stanford University, Vanderbilt Law
- Occupation: Real Estate Developer
- Employer: Lion Real Estate Group
- Political party: Republican
- Website: grantfortn.com

Grant Everett Starrett is an American real estate developer and conservative attorney who resides in Murfreesboro, Tennessee. He was a Republican candidate for Congress in Tennessee’s 4th District in 2016. He lost.

== Early life and education ==
Starrett grew up in California. He has been politically conservative since junior high school and politically active since high school. "I came to consider myself a hawkish fairly traditional Christian conservative – part of the ‘old majority,’ if you will.” Starrett attended Stanford University and Vanderbilt Law School. Disappointed with the Stanford chapter of the College Republicans, he founded the Stanford Conservative Society and grew it to over 500 members. Starrett raised over $200,000 for the 2008 Romney campaign as chair of Students for Mitt, which he grew to over 4,500 members. At Vanderbilt he was president of the student chapter of the Federalist Society, president of the Vanderbilt Law School Republicans, and an officer of the Christian Legal Society. He moved to Tennessee in 2009 and became a Murfreesboro resident in January, 2015.

During college and law school, Starrett worked at the Republican National Committee, the White House, and Fox News under Bill O’Reilly, and in the Senate Steering Committee under Senator Jim DeMint and the American Center for Law and Justice under Jay Sekulow.

== Career ==
After graduating from Vanderbilt in 2012, Starrett served as coalitions coordinator and chair of Young Professionals for Mitt Romney. He was elected chairman of the Nashville lawyers chapter of the Federalist Society. In 2013 he co-founded and served as president of Tennesseans for Judicial Accountability. Starrett is vice president and special counsel of the Los Angeles-based Lion Real Estate Group.

== 2016 Congressional campaign ==
In April 2015 Starrett announced that he would run against incumbent congressman Scott DesJarlais in the Republican primary. Starrett raised nearly $1.7 million in his bid for Congress by July 2015, including just under $900,000 of his own money.

Starrett was endorsed by Erick Erickson of RedState, Mark Levin and Dr. James Dobson and was supported by Paul Mirengoff of Power Line. In April 2015 Erickson wrote that Starrett "would be an outstanding member of the Freedom Caucus".

Starrett lost to Scott DesJarlais in the August 4, 2016 primary, netting only 43.34% of the vote, compared to DesJarlais's 52.12%. During the campaign, Scott DesJarlais alleged that Starrett's employment with Lion Real Estate Group was really part of his parents' social circle's effort to bankroll his campaign from California. The Islamic Center of Murfreesboro also complained about Starrett's campaign after Starrett distributed a campaign mailer the Islamic Center deemed to be racist.
