= Republican Jewish Coalition =

American political lobbying group

- Formation: May 24, 1985; 41 years ago
- Tax ID no.: 52-1386172
- Legal status: 501(c)(4) nonprofit organization
- Headquarters: Washington, D.C., United States
- Executive Director: Matthew Brooks
- Chairman: Norm Coleman
- Subsidiaries: National Jewish Policy Center; Republican Jewish Coalition Political Action Committee
- Revenue: $13.4 million (2024)
- Expenses: $12.4 million (2024)
- Website: rjchq.org
- Formerly called: National Jewish Coalition

The Republican Jewish Coalition (RJC), formerly the National Jewish Coalition, founded in 1985, is a political group in the United States that supports Jewish Republicans. The organization has more than 47 chapters throughout the United States.

== Purpose ==
RJC leaders Norm Coleman and Matt Brooks at the organization's 2026 summit

The official mission statement of the RJC is to foster and enhance ties between the American Jewish community and Republican decision makers in the United States. According to its website, the RJC "works to sensitize Republican leadership in government and the party to the concerns and issues of the Jewish community, while articulating and advocating Republican ideas and policies within the Jewish community."

The RJC also strives to build a "strong, effective and respected" voice of Jewish Republicans that can influence activities, policies and ideas in Washington and across the country.

The group's policy platform objectives include terrorism, national security, Israel–United States relations, Mideast peace process, The Palestinian Authority, Syria, Iran, immigration, energy policy, education, school prayer, affirmative action, the Workplace Religious Freedom Act, adoption, crime, taxes, welfare reform, faith-based initiatives, health care, Medicare reform, Social Security reform, and government reform.

== Political activities during the 2008 presidential election ==
During the 2008 election campaign, the RJC ran a series of advertisements in Jewish newspapers around the United States, mostly critical of Barack Obama and linking him to individuals such as Iranian leader Mahmoud Ahmadinejad, Reverend Jeremiah Wright, and even Patrick Buchanan. Salon.com also claimed the RJC was participating in polling phone calls ("push polls") made to potential voters in Pennsylvania and Florida that reportedly asked negative questions about Obama.

== Barack Obama presidency ==
The RJC was highly critical of the Obama administration's policies. The group questioned Obama's relationship with Zbigniew Brzezinski, Samantha Power, and Chas Freeman, whom it believes to "possess strong anti-Israel biases that are well documented". The RJC has also criticized Hillary Clinton for having made remarks regarding the United States putting more pressure on Israel. These arguments received attention and were significantly challenged by the National Jewish Democratic Council.

In the 2012 United States presidential election, casino owner and political contributor Sheldon Adelson supported the RJC in a campaign to win over Jewish voters in battleground states.

== See also ==
- Democratic Majority for Israel
- Jewish Democratic Council of America
- List of Jewish American politicians
- National Jewish Democratic Council
- Republican Muslim Coalition
- Republican Hindu Coalition
