= Saba Ahmed =

American lawyer

- Born: January 11, 1985 (age 41); Rawalpindi, Pakistan
- Citizenship: Pakistan; United States
- Education: Portland State University (BS); University of Portland (JD)
- Occupation: President of the Republican Muslim Coalition
- Political party: Republican
- Movement: Conservatism

Saba Ahmed (born January 11, 1985) is a Pakistani-American political activist, lawyer, and engineer. She is the founder and president of the Republican Muslim Coalition, former lawyer at the United States Patent and Trademark Office, and former engineer at Intel. She has urged Muslim Americans to vote Republican. She supports Donald Trump, but has said she is "deeply hurt by [his] ignorant views of Islam."

== Biography ==
Ahmed was born in Rawalpindi, Pakistan, moved to America when she was 12, and then grew up in Oregon.

She came to public attention as a friend of the family of Mohamed Osman Mohamud, convicted for his attempt to bomb a Christmas tree lighting in Portland, Oregon. Ahmed was interviewed by the press. She posited that he may have been "framed."

In January 2011, she was in the local news because her family said she was missing, but she was actually safe in California. At that time her family claimed she was diagnosed with a mental disorder, but Ahmed has denied that. In 2011, she ran for U.S. Congress as a Democrat.

In 2014, she published an essay in The Guardian, explaining that she had become a Republican in 2014 because she believes her Islamic pro-life, pro-traditional family, pro-business, pro-trade values are aligned with GOP. In June 2014, at a panel hosted by The Heritage Foundation on the Benghazi attacks, activist Brigitte Gabriel taunted her after asking about their portrayal of all Muslims as bad. In 2015, she made headlines for wearing an American flag hijab on Fox News. She was discussing Trump's comment that he would consider shutting down certain radical mosques after a series of terrorist attacks in Paris. She invited Trump to go to a mosque.

== Election history ==
Oregon 1st Congressional District Special Democratic Primary Election, 2011
Party	Candidate	Votes	%
Democratic	Suzanne Bonamici	49,721	65.18
Democratic	Brad Avakian	16,963	22.24
Democratic	Brad Witt	6,003	7.87
Democratic	Dan Strite	1,212	1.59
Democratic	Dominic Hammon	923	1.21
Democratic	Todd Lee Ritter	651	0.85
Democratic	Write-ins	469	0.61
Democratic	Saba Ahmed	250	0.33
Democratic	Robert Lettin	91	0.12
