= Scott DesJarlais =

American politician (born 1964)

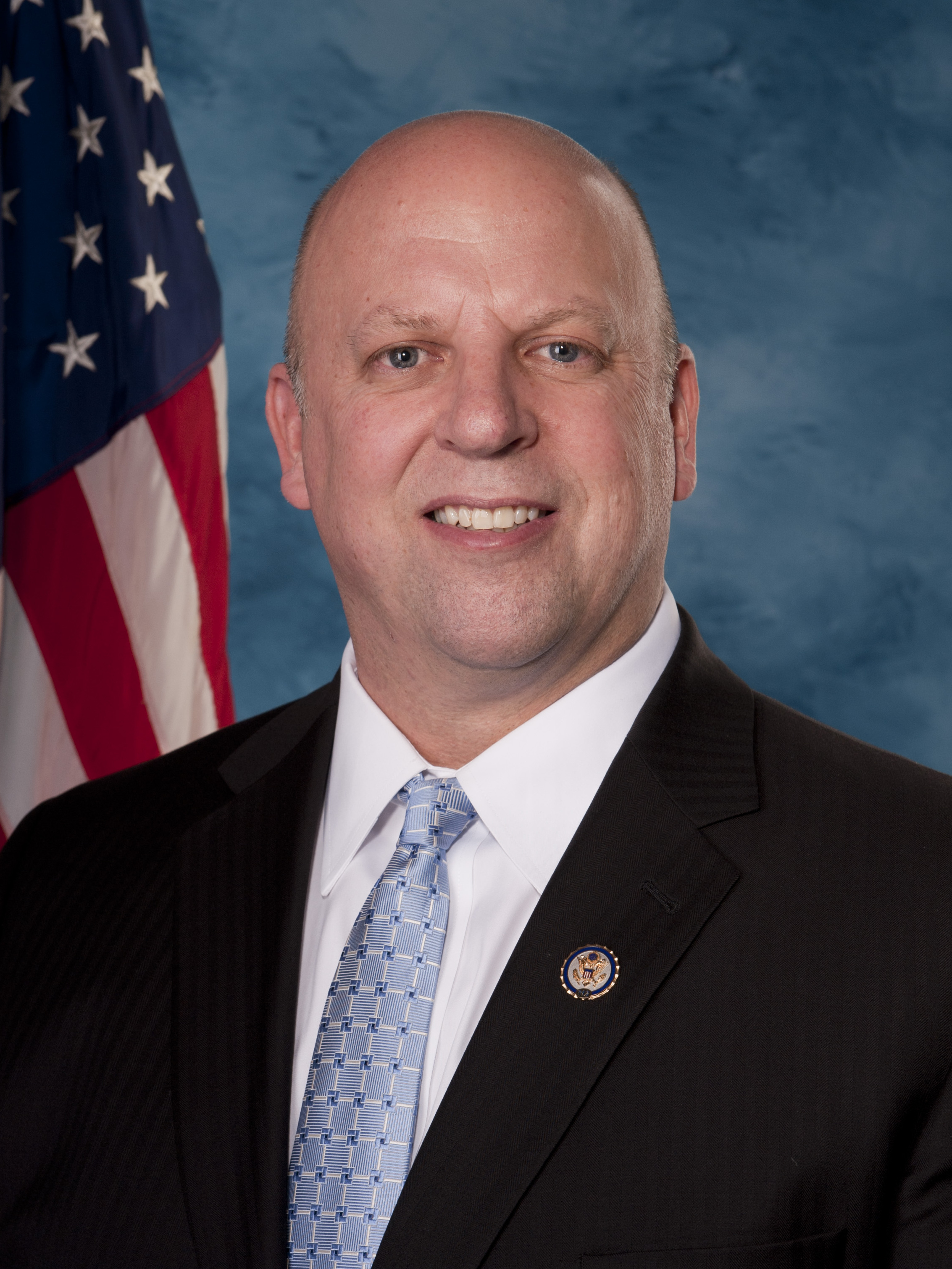
- Official portrait, 2011

Member of the U.S. House of Representatives from Tennessee's 4th district
- Incumbent
- Assumed office January 3, 2011
- Preceded by: Lincoln Davis

Personal details
- Born: Scott Eugene DesJarlais; February 21, 1964 (age 62) Des Moines, Iowa, U.S.
- Party: Republican
- Spouse(s): Susan DesJarlais (div. 1998) Amy DesJarlais (m. 2002)
- Children: 3
- Education: University of South Dakota (BS, MD)
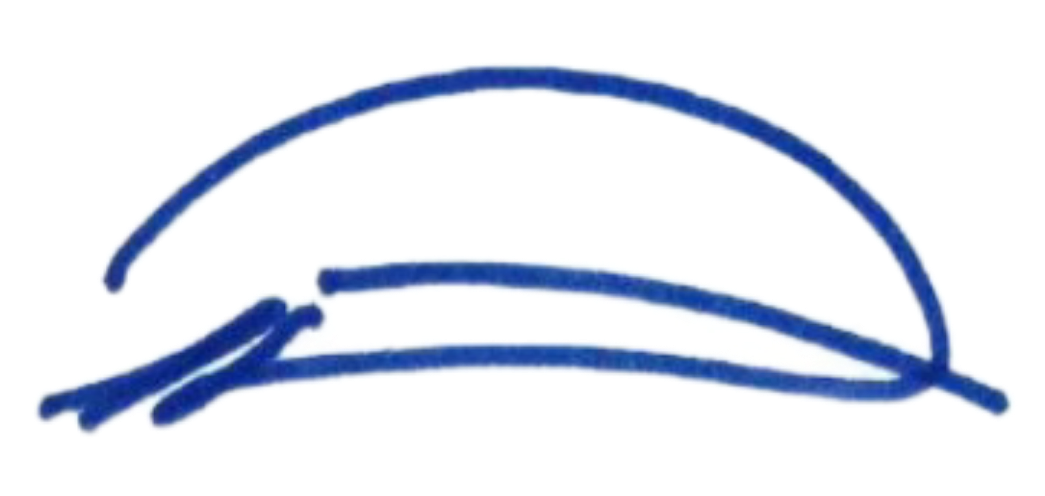
- Signature
- Website: House website Campaign website

Scott Eugene DesJarlais (/ˌdeɪʒɑːrˈleɪ/ DAY-zhar-LAY; born February 21, 1964) is an American politician and physician serving as the U.S. representative for Tennessee's 4th congressional district since 2011. He is a member of the Republican Party.

== Early life ==
DesJarlais was born in 1964 in Des Moines, Iowa, to Joe DesJarlais, a barber, and Sylvia, a registered nurse. He grew up in Sturgis, South Dakota. DesJarlais earned his undergraduate degree in Chemistry and Psychology from the University of South Dakota in 1987 and his Doctor of Medicine from the University of South Dakota School of Medicine in 1991. He moved to East Tennessee in 1993 to practice medicine as a generalist.

== U.S. House of Representatives ==
=== Elections ===
==== 2010 ====
DesJarlais is a member of the Tea Party movement. In 2009 he entered politics, filing papers to challenge Democratic incumbent Lincoln Davis, as well as Independents Paul H. Curtis, James Gray, Richard S. Johnson, and Gerald York.

Late in the 2010 race, the Washington newspaper Roll Call reported details of DesJarlais's 2001 divorce proceedings, which showed that his ex-wife accused him of harassment, intimidation and physical abuse. The Davis campaign used the material in print and TV attack ads and told Roll Call that Fourth District voters "expect[ed] more than lip service about family values."

DesJarlais defeated Davis 57%–39%.

==== 2012 ====
During his first term, DesJarlais represented a district that stretched almost diagonally across the state from coal-mining regions near Knoxville, the Tri-Cities and Chattanooga to the outer suburbs of Nashville.

By the 2012 election, the Fourth District had been significantly altered as a result of redistricting. It lost all of its northeastern portion and was pushed west to take in suburban areas closer to Nashville, including Murfreesboro, previously the heart of the 6th district. The redrawn 4th contained about half of the constituents who resided in the former 4th district, with 14 of 24 counties moved elsewhere.

DesJarlais was challenged by Democratic nominee and state senator Eric Stewart. For a time, it was thought that DesJarlais would face a primary challenge from state senator Bill Ketron, a Murfreesboro resident and the chairman of the state senate redistricting committee, but Ketron did not run. DesJarlais defeated Stewart 56%–44%, joining all the other incumbent members of Tennessee congressional delegation in winning reelection.

==== 2014 ====
In 2014 DesJarlais's seat was considered vulnerable, as controversy over the divorce record revelations returned to the fore. He had been reelected in 2012 with a reduced majority. DesJarlais held his seat.

State senator Jim Tracy challenged DesJarlais in the primary. At the end of June 2013, Tracy had raised nearly $750,000 (including over $300,000 in the second quarter of 2013) for his bid. He raised an additional $150,000 in the fourth quarter and reported $840,000 cash on hand. By contrast, at the end of September, DesJarlais reported $170,000 cash on hand. DesJarlais won the primary by 38 votes. Tracy decided not to challenge the results, despite citing irregularities.

==== 2016 ====
In January 2016, Politico rated Tennessee's Fourth District one of the top five primary races to watch, and in March ranked DesJarlais one of the most vulnerable incumbents in the 2016 cycle; he was one of only two Tennessee incumbents to face serious challenge. His primary opponents were attorney and conservative activist Grant Starrett, attorney and physician Yomi "Fapas" Faparusi and economic data specialist Erran Persley. The Murfreesboro Post described Starrett as "running to the right of DesJarlais". After winning the primary, DesJarlais beat Democrat Steven Reynolds in the general election by a margin of 30 points.

==== 2018 ====
DesJarlais was again challenged in the primary, but won by 40 points. He went on to win the general election by almost 30 points.

==== 2020 ====
In 2020 DesJarlais defeated Republican primary challenger Doug Meyer, a veteran and former police officer. Christopher Hale won the Democratic primary. Hale describes himself as a "pro-life Democrat" and strongly criticized DesJarlais for having pressured his mistress to get an abortion.

==== 2022 ====
In 2022 DesJarlais won re-election.

==== 2024 ====
In 2024, DesJarlais won reelection comfortably against Democratic nominee Victoria Broderick, with 70% of the vote.

==== 2026 ====
In the blue wave election of 2026, DesJarlais was narrowly defeated by Democrat Victoria Broderick. This was widely seen as a major upset due to the district's strong Republican lean and the fact that DeJarlais had heavily outspent Broderick.

=== Tenure ===
In December 2020, DesJarlais was one of 126 Republican members of the House of Representatives to sign an amicus brief in support of Texas v. Pennsylvania, a lawsuit filed at the United States Supreme Court contesting the results of the 2020 presidential election, in which Joe Biden defeated incumbent Donald Trump. The Supreme Court declined to hear the case on the basis that Texas lacked standing under Article III of the Constitution to challenge the results of an election held by another state.

In June 2021, DesJarlais was one of 14 House Republicans to vote against legislation to establish June 19, or Juneteenth, as a federal holiday.

In July 2021, DesJarlais voted against the bipartisan ALLIES Act, which would increase by 8,000 the number of special immigrant visas for Afghan allies of the U.S. military during its invasion of Afghanistan, while also reducing some application requirements that caused long application backlogs; the bill passed in the House 407–16.

In 2022, DesJarlais was one of 39 Republicans to vote for the Merger Filing Fee Modernization Act of 2022, an antitrust package that would crack down on corporations for anti-competitive behavior.

DesJarlais was among the 71 Republicans who voted against final passage of the Fiscal Responsibility Act of 2023 in the House.

DesJarlais voted to provide Israel with support following the 2023 Hamas attack on Israel.

=== Committee assignments ===
For the 119th Congress:

- Committee on Agriculture
  - Subcommittee on Livestock, Dairy, and Poultry
  - Subcommittee on Nutrition and Foreign Agriculture
- Committee on Armed Services
  - Subcommittee on Seapower and Projection Forces
  - Subcommittee on Strategic Forces (Chairman)

=== Caucus memberships ===
- Freedom Caucus
- Republican Study Committee
- Republican Doctors Caucus
- General Aviation Caucus
- Congressional Caucus to Fight and Control Methamphetamine
- Congressional Skin Care Caucus
- Congressional Sportsmen's Caucus
- Congressional Chicken Caucus
- Congressional Taiwan Caucus
- Congressional Range and Testing Center Caucus
- Congressional Aluminum Caucus
- Congressional Arthritis Caucus
- Congressional Diabetes Caucus
- Cystic Fibrosis Caucus
- Malaria Caucus
- Border Security Caucus

DesJarlais was the first member of the House Freedom Caucus to endorse Donald Trump for president of the United States.

== Sex, abortion, and drug scandals ==
In October 2012 the Huffington Post obtained a transcript of a September 2000 phone conversation in which DesJarlais pressured a mistress to get an abortion. He repeatedly denied that he had taped the conversation. In October he wrote to supporters on Facebook, "The media wrongly reported that I recorded the conversation myself. I was recorded unknowingly and without my consent." Nine days before the general election a second woman said that she began dating DesJarlais while she was his patient. She alleged that the two smoked marijuana together and that he prescribed opioids for her while she was at his house.

Two weeks after DesJarlais won the 2012 election, the Chattanooga Times Free Press obtained a full transcript of his 2001 divorce proceedings. The transcript revealed that he had admitted under oath to at least six sexual relationships with people he came in contact with while chief of staff at Grandview Medical Center in Jasper, Tennessee. Among them were three co-workers, two patients and a drug representative. The transcript also revealed that his former wife had had two abortions, and that DesJarlais had admitted under oath that he and his former wife had recorded the phone conversation with the mistress. "One of the biggest mistakes I made was I commented to the press before I had the opportunity to go back and read a transcript that was 13, 14 years old," he said in an interview with the Knoxville News Sentinel. "It was never my intention to mislead anyone, and had I read this, I don't think the inaccuracies that occurred would have taken place."

Three weeks after he won the election, DesJarlais said on a conservative talk radio show on WWTN that "God has forgiven me" and asked "fellow Christians" and constituents "to consider doing the same."

=== Formal reprimand ===
In October 2012, the watchdog group Citizens for Responsibility and Ethics in Washington (CREW) requested that the Tennessee Board of Health investigate evidence that DesJarlais had had a sexual relationship with a patient, in violation of the Tennessee Medical Practice Act. The complaint was investigated and in May 2013 the Tennessee Board of Medical Examiners formally reprimanded DesJarlais for having sex with patients and fined him $500, calculated by the Board as "$250 per patient", and $1,000 in costs. He did not contest the charges.

In November 2012, after further details of the divorce proceedings were published, CREW asked the House of Representatives' Office of Congressional Ethics to investigate whether DesJarlais had violated House ethics rules, asserting that he had "blatantly" lied when he denied having taped the telephone conversation.

== Personal life ==
DesJarlais and his second wife, Amy, have three children. They live in South Pittsburg. DesJarlais is an Episcopalian.

During a trial for his divorce from his first wife in 2000, DesJarlais testified that he had sexual affairs with at least two patients, three coworkers and a drug representative while he was working as a hospital chief of staff.

Despite his public opposition to legal abortion, DesJarlais encouraged his ex-wife to terminate two pregnancies and encouraged a former patient with whom he was having an affair to get an abortion.

In divorce documents, DesJarlais's first wife accused him of "dry firing a gun outside [her] locked bedroom door, admission of suicidal ideation, holding a gun in his mouth for three hours, an incident of physical intimidation at the hospital; and previous threatening behavior … i.e. shoving, tripping, pushing down, etc."

=== Health ===
In July 2014, DesJarlais announced he was undergoing aggressive chemotherapy to treat cancer in his neck that had spread to a lymph node. In a campaign appearance during his illness he said the cancer had affected his voice but added that the type is curable 90% of the time. The cancer and chemotherapy caused him to lose over 40 pounds, limiting his ability to make appearances and campaign. In June 2015, DesJarlais announced that he was cancer-free.

== See also ==
- List of federal political sex scandals in the United States
- List of federal political scandals in the United States
- Physicians in the United States Congress

U.S. House of Representatives
Preceded by Lincoln Davis	Member of the U.S. House of Representatives from Tennessee's 4th congressional district 2011–present	Incumbent
U.S. order of precedence (ceremonial)
Preceded by Rick Crawford	United States representatives by seniority 79th	Succeeded by Chuck Fleischmann
