= Wide Angle (TV program) =

- Genre: Documentary
- Created by: Stephen Segaller and Andy Halper
- Presented by: Aaron Brown
- Narrated by: Jay O. Sanders
- Country of origin: United States
- Original language: English
- No. of seasons: 8
- No. of episodes: 63 (list of episodes)

Production
- Executive producers: Tom Casciato, Pamela Hogan (Specials)
- Producer: Thirteen/WNET

Original release
- Network: Thirteen/WNET and PBS
- Release: July 11, 2002 – September 2, 2009

Wide Angle is an American documentary television program produced by Thirteen/WNET New York for broadcast on PBS and for worldwide distribution. The weekly one-hour program covered international current affairs and was last hosted by veteran journalist Aaron Brown. Wide Angle began broadcasting on PBS in 2002, and aimed to expand the awareness and understanding of Americans about the changing world in which they live. It was the only documentary program on American television devoted exclusively to reporting in-depth on international issues. Following its eighth and final season it was nominated for a 2010 International Documentary Association Continuing Series award.

== Production ==
Wide Angle programs consist of long-form, character-driven documentaries exploring pressing international issues through human stories, often followed by an interview with a foreign policy expert to connect the films’ themes to American concerns. The program completed its eighth season in 2009, and in that time it had produced more than 60 films in over 50 countries.

Wide Angle also produced a companion website, still extant, and additional educational materials for each film. The program's website includes background information on the issues from the films, interactive features, exclusive video and audio, and full streaming versions of many programs. Additional educational materials are distributed to high schools and colleges. In 2006, Wide Angle's online Window into Global History project earned the Goldman Sachs Foundation's Prize for Excellence in International Education.

Previous anchors for the program include Bill Moyers, former Assistant Secretary of State James Rubin, Mishal Husain, and Daljit Dhaliwal. Previous interview guests include Senator Hillary Clinton, UN Deputy Secretary-General Mark Malloch Brown, Mexico’s former Foreign Minister Jorge Castañeda, former Ugandan government minister Betty Oyella Bigombe, Nobel Prize Laureates Joseph E. Stiglitz and Amartya Sen, WHO Director-General Margaret Chan, Women for Women International CEO Zainab Salbi, New York Times columnist Nicholas Kristof, writer Arundhati Roy and former U.S. Secretaries of State George Mitchell and James A. Baker III.

== Episodes ==
The July 2002 pilot episode "Saddam’s Ultimate Solution" was hosted by former Assistant Secretary of State and chief State Department spokesman James Rubin. It focused on Saddam Hussein’s biological and chemical weapons and the wider threat they imply. In a host interview broadcast immediately following the episode, resident fellow at the American Enterprise Institute Richard Perle stated that "the thing that is brought home so clearly in this film is the connection among terrorist organizations now implicating Saddam Hussein directly with Al Qaeda".

== Reception ==
Wide Angle programs have won numerous awards, including an Emmy Award, the Sigma Delta Chi Award, the Chicago International Television Hugo award, the Gabriel Award, several top awards from the South Asian Journalists Association (SAJA), citations from the Overseas Press Club, and 22 Cine Golden Eagle awards.

The New York Times had a mixed review of the first program "Saddam’s Ultimate Solution", especially concerning the interview of Richard Perle by host James Rubin:

Mr. Perle offers an argument rather than analysis when he says an American operation in Iraq will be "quicker and easier than many people think," a matter of weeks not months. Mr. Rubin questions what he calls this "optimistic scenario," but because it's not his role to take a position, the Perle interview is the lopsided half of a debate. Still, in a television landscape where network news is dominated by tiny sound bites and cable by shouting heads, Wide Angle had a distinct and valuable place.

— Caryn James, The New York Times

== Focal Point ==
In December 2008, Wide Angle launched, Focal Point, a new online-exclusive documentary program. Like Wide Angle, Focal Point offers a deeper understanding of forces shaping the world today through compelling human stories, with Focal Point providing a venue for shorter, less formal pieces.

In the first episode of Focal Point, "From Jihad to Rehab", Canadian journalist Nancy Durham reports from a rehabilitation center in Saudi Arabia, where art therapy and religious re-education are being used to reform militant jihadists.

== See also ==
- Exposé: America's Investigative Reports
- Frontline
- Independent Lens
- P.O.V.
- Worldfocus
