= Muslims for America =

Advocacy group

Muslims For America is an advocacy group dedicated to introducing American Muslims into politics and ensuring US foreign policy is "written with an understanding of Islam." According to its website, Muslims For America aims to work with the Republican National Committee, in setting up American Muslim Republican Caucuses within each US state Republican Party, in addition to building relations with the Democratic Party.

The group was founded and is funded by American Muslims of Pakistani and Central Asian descent, Muhammad Ali Hasan, and his mother, Seeme Gull Khan Hasan. Claiming to be bipartisan in nature, Muslims For America believe "the best foreign policy plans can mature from both the Republican Party and Democratic Party".

However, some hold the view that the group is really a partisan Republican lobby organization; one of the group's founders, Seeme Gull Khan Hasan, reportedly having "donated more than $1 million to Bush and Republican causes since the 2000 [US Presidential election] campaign". When announcing the name change from Muslims For Bush, the group stated among its aims, to "create greater friendships between American Muslims and the Republican Party."

During the 2006 Israel-Lebanon conflict the organization faced conflicting interest between the strong support of Israel by the U.S. government and American politicians, and the general attitude of Muslims toward Israel.

Muslims For America has consistently expressed a zero tolerance policy for any kind of terrorism, "in following the example left by Prophet Muhammad."

In 2010, co-founder Muhammad Ali Hasan announced that he would be leaving the Republican Party citing the party's bigotry against Muslims, undocumented immigrants, and gays. His mother Seeme has also criticized the party for its opposition to the Park51 Muslim community center, claiming that "The past few years in the Republican party has been constant humiliation for Muslims."

== See also ==
- Saba Ahmed
