= South Asian Journalists Association =

The South Asian Journalists Association (SAJA) was founded in 1994 in New York City. Sree Sreenivisan, Dilip Massand, M.K. Srinivasan and Om Malik co-founded SAJA as a networking organization for South Asian journalists. It is a group of more than 1,000 journalists of South Asian origin in the U.S. and Canada. South Asia refers to India, Pakistan, Afghanistan, Sri Lanka, the Maldives, Bangladesh, Bhutan, and Nepal. SAJA is a not-for-profit organization, governed by a board of directors which appoints its executive officers. As of January 2022, the President of SAJA is Sabrina Malhi. In 2003, the SAJA Group, Inc., an affiliated non-profit 501(c)(3) organization, was formed to jointly execute SAJA programming and events. SAJA is an important networking resource for journalists covering South Asia and journalists of South Asian origin. SAJA also offers internships, scholarships, and mentorship to journalism students and new journalists.

From its website:

The South Asian Journalists Association (SAJA) is a non-profit organization that provides a networking and resource forum for journalists of South Asian origin and journalists covering South Asia or the South Asian Diaspora. SAJA's mission also includes acting as a resource to facilitate and promote accurate coverage of South Asia and South Asians in North America.

== Executive Committee and Current Board Members ==
SAJA is governed by a 11-member board of directors. Board members are elected to two-year terms by Full Members of SAJA. As of January 2022, the Executive Committee members of the Board are:

PRESIDENT	Mythili Sampathkumar
VICE PRESIDENT	Jennifer Chowdhury
TREASURER	John Laxmi
SECRETARY	Priyanka Vora
COMMUNICATIONS OFFICER	NA

The other six members of the Board are:

Farnoush Amiri
Angeli Kakade
Karen Mahabir
Mihir Zaveri
Pia Sarkar

== Awards Ceremony ==
SAJA annually holds an award ceremony to recognize South Asian journalists and students in the U.S. and Canada and honor their excellent achievements as well as coverage of South Asia. The Association presents annual awards honoring work in print, broadcast and new media outlets, in categories including Outstanding story on South Asia, Outstanding photograph of South Asia or of South Asians in North America, and Outstanding story on any subject by a South Asian Journalist.

== Digital Archives ==
SAJA's website (www.saja.org) also is an online archive for the organization and a resource for journalists. The Association also maintains 15.5 linear feet of physical files and brochures of South Asian diasporic periodicals and articles.
