= Anti-Assyrian sentiment =

Aversion, prejudice and fear against Assyrians or their culture

Anti-Assyrian sentiment, also known as anti-Assyrianism and Assyrophobia, refers to negative feelings, dislikes, fears, aversions, racism, derision, and/or prejudice towards Assyria, Assyrian culture, Syriac Christianity, and Assyrians.

Anti-Assyrian sentiment largely manifested itself during the time of the dissolution of the Ottoman Empire, reaching its peak with the Assyrian genocide (Sayfo), and has continued throughout the 20th and 21st centuries in varying forms across Iraq, Iran, Syria, and Turkey, that is, all the countries that were established on the territory of the destroyed indigenous Assyrian homeland of Assyria. The most notorious and destructive examples of violence towards Assyrians include the Simele massacre, the Anfal campaign, forced assimilation campaigns (Arabization, Kurdification, Turkification), and systematic persecution by the Islamic State terrorists. Similar to Anti-Armenian sentiment, Anti-Assyrian sentiment has historically also been fueled by an Anti-Christian sentiment. Recent scholarship has demonstrated that anti-Assyrian sentiment in Western academia is linked to systematic Armenian genocide denial.

== Turkey ==
In 1894–1897, during the Hamidian massacres in the Ottoman Empire, hundreds of thousands of Armenians were killed. Kurdish and Turkish forces carried out attacks in some regions, and it is estimated that around 55,000 Assyrians were also brutally killed.

George Aslan, an Assyrian-Turkish politician, was harassed in the Turkish parliament for speaking Turoyo. In 2023, around Christmas, he sent a Turoyo message to the Assyrians in Turkey, with permission from Sırrı Süreyya Önder, although members of the Good Party interrupted his speech with racial insults.

He responded to the Good Party by stating, "I want to repeat what I said in the Parliament: We did not bring this language from another planet. Syriac is a language of this land. We have been the indigenous people of this land for 12,000 years. We were here when no one else was on these lands. Why they react so strongly is incomprehensible. However, we know that this is a denial of real history." In 2024, also around Christmas, he delivered another Turoyo message before Bekir Bozdağ turned off his microphone, to which Aslan replied that "Some deputies are reading Arabic verses from the Quran on the podium. Please turn it off when the verses are read. If it doesn't turn off, I, who never tease anyone, will tease you very much, believe me. If there is holiness, all holiness is given importance."

== Kurdistan ==
In 1843, Assyrian Christians in Hakkari faced a series of massacres, which lasted until 1846, orchestrated by the Kurdish emirs Bedir Khan Beg and Nurullah Beg of Bohtan and Hakkari, with support from some Assyrian tribes opposing Shimun XVII Abraham’s authority. According to Dr. Smith, the death toll from these events ranged between 10,000 and 15,000, with roughly 10,000 killed during the initial campaign. Another American missionary, Justin Perkins, estimated that about 7,000 Nestorians were slain in Tkhuma alone in 1846.

In 1911, Jessie Payne Margoliouth, a British Assyriologist, while describing the Ottoman Empire, stated that the Kurds "are natural enemies of the Assyrians, and live side by side with them. Struggles are almost constantly going on between them, frequently producing actual conflicts." In October 1917, the Ottomans launched the Persian campaign with the hopes of capturing more land. The Assyrians, led by Agha Petros, held them off until June 1918; however, up to 100,000 Assyrians left Persia in 1918, but around half died of Turkish and Kurdish massacres, starvation, disease, or famine. About 80 percent of Assyrian clergy and influential leaders had perished.

The Associated Press reported that in the vicinity of Urmia, "Turkish regular troops and Kurds are persecuting and massacring Assyrian Christians." The victims included 800 massacred near Urmia, and 2,000 dead from disease. Two hundred Assyrians were burned to death inside a church, and the Russians had discovered more than 700 bodies of massacre victims in the village of Hafdewan outside Urmia, "mostly naked and mutilated", some with gunshot wounds, others decapitated, and others chopped to pieces. The New York Times reported on 11 October that 12,000 Assyrian Christians had died of massacre, hunger, or disease; thousands of girls as young as seven had been raped in sex attacks, or forcibly converted to Islam; Christian villages had been destroyed, and three-fourths of these Christian villages were burned to the ground.

In the Kurdistan Region, Assyrians claimed that Kurdish authorities often attempted to portray Assyrians as Christian Kurds. In 2008, Assyrians formed the Qaraqosh Protection Committee, aiming to protect Assyrian towns, villages, and regions. In 2008, Paulos Faraj Rahho was assassinated. Some Assyrians accused the Kurds, while others accused the Arabs. Some Assyrians have claimed that Kurdish forces, namely KDP, often used to practice shooting targets on Assyrian cultural heritage sites.

In 2009, Benham Benoka, an Assyrian priest and community leader, complained that a group of Shabaks, supported by the Kurdish government, entered Assyrian neighborhoods in the Nineveh Plains and provocatively held Muharram mourning rituals in front of a church on Christmas.

The United States Department of State reported that "Kurdish authorities abused and discriminated against minorities in the North, including Turcomen, Arabs, Christians, and Shabak", and that Kurdish authorities "denied services to some villages, arrested minorities without due process and took them to undisclosed locations for detention, and pressured minority schools to teach in the Kurdish language."

Assyrians accused the Kurdish school curriculum of Kurdification, and accused the KRG of confiscating and occupying Assyrian lands, claiming that "the Kurds invent new and impossible laws when the legitimate owners ask for their lands." Some Assyrians claimed that while Kurds were well funded, the Assyrians received almost no funding for their schools. They also accused Kurdish authorities of changing traditional Christian names to Kurdish names, and even portraying Christian biblical figures as Kurds in some textbooks. Assyrian activists claimed that Kurds who attacked Assyrians were either allowed to walk freely or given light sentences. They claimed that Kurds also targeted Assyrians who supported the KRG.

The US State government reported that in the KRG, Assyrian schools and classes were not permitted to teach in Syriac and were even prevented in some cases. There were also incidents of mob violence by the PKK against Christians. Assyrian activists criticised the KRG for the lack of investigation of bombings in 1998 and 1999 targeting Assyrians in Erbil. According to the US Department of State, the KDP had blockaded Assyrian villages in 1999 and "later entered the villages and beat villagers." However, the KDP withdrew from the villages after pressure from the Red Cross. Assyrian organizations accused Kurdish criminal organizations of forcing Assyrian girls into prostitution and threatening their families.

The 2011 Duhok riots began on 2 December in the Duhok Governorate, Iraq, after sermons in Zakho called for attacks on businesses. The unrest spread to other towns, where Assyrian- and Yazidi-owned properties were looted and burned, causing around four million dollars in damages.

== Iraq ==
Christian priests were prime targets; eight Assyrian priests were killed during the massacre, including one beheaded and another burned alive. Back in the city of Duhok, 600 Assyrians were killed by Sidqi's men. In the end, around 65 Assyrian villages were targeted in the Mosul and Dohuk districts. The Simele massacre of the Assyrian people is often regarded as a phase of the Assyrian genocide beginning in August 1914, in the early days of what became World War I. Today, most of these villages are inhabited by Kurds. The main campaign lasted until August 16, but violent raids on Assyrians were being reported up to the end of the month. After the campaign, Bakr Sidqi was invited to Baghdad for a victory rally. The campaign resulted in one-third of the Assyrian population of Iraq fleeing to Syria.

In 1962, thirty-three Assyrians were killed in Barwar, Iraq, by forces under the Kurdish leader Mustafa Barzani.

In 1969, 39 members of the Iraqi Chaldean community were killed in the Soria Massacre during a military attack.

In 1980, before the outbreak of the Iran–Iraq War, thousands of Iraqi citizens of Iranian descent, including many Assyrians and Kurds, were deported to Iran. During the conflict, an estimated 10,000 Assyrian men from Iraq lost their lives.

On 2 March 1985, three Assyrians were executed in Iraq by the Ba’ath regime for opposing the government’s Arabization policies.

After the Invasion of Iraq and the fall of Saddam Hussein, Assyrians became victims of Islamist violence. During the period of 2003–2013, there were increasing amounts of Church attacks, beheadings, and bombings of Assyrians.

After the Fall of Mosul, ISIS demanded that Assyrian Christians living in the city convert to Islam, pay jizyah, or face execution by 19 July 2014. ISIS leader Abu Bakr al-Baghdadi further noted that Christians who do not agree to follow those terms must "leave the borders of the Islamic Caliphate" within a specified deadline. This resulted in a complete Assyrian exodus from Mosul, marking the end of 1,800 years of continuous Christian presence. A church mass was not held in Mosul for the first time in nearly 2 thousand years.

In 2020, a political party called "Hawpa" was established in Erbil. The party's ideology is based on the Hîwa Party (1939 – 1946) and the Kajik Party (1959 – 1975), both of which were founded on the basis of fascism and Nazism. The party has previously used social media platforms to express beliefs that Arabs should be expelled from the Kurdish region, while Assyrians and Turkmen should be subject to genocide. In 2025, two Assyrian organizations in Europe sent a joint letter to the KRG denouncing their recognition of the party as an organization and continued targeting of Assyrians and non-Kurdish groups.

On April 1, 2025, during Kha b-Nisan celebrations in the city of Duhok, two Assyrians were injured by a Syrian refugee in what is believed to have been an Islamist terror attack. The attacker initially hid the weapons in a bag until making his way to the scene of the parades for the Assyrian New Year. An Assyrian flag that had been stained with blood was waved during the rest of the parade as a symbol of resilience and was also present in social media videos. After the attack, celebrations of Akitu continued as planned, with attendees continuing to wave flags and perform traditional dances. The attack was greatly condemned by members of the Assyrian community, particularly in the diaspora, who faced a wave of hate speech on social media following the attack. The event also sparked concerns about the safety of Assyrians who remain in Iraq, and the willingness of the diaspora to make returns to live in the country or visit for celebrations.

== Syria ==
On 23 February 2015, 150 Assyrians from villages near Tell Tamer in northeastern Syria were kidnapped by ISIS. At Assyrian Christian farming villages on the banks of the Khabur River in Northeast Syria, 253 people, 51 of them children and 84 of them were women, with one account claiming that ISIS is demanding $22 million (or roughly $100,000 per person) for their release. On 8 October 2015, ISIS released a video showing three of the Assyrian men kidnapped in Khabur being murdered. It was reported that 202 of the 253 kidnapped Assyrians were still in captivity, each one with a demanded ransom of $100,000. On 25 October, hundreds of civilians were trapped in Sadad, Syria, with Archbishop Silwanos Al-Nemeh saying that the situation was dire and that they were in fear of a massacre. Also, opposition fighters entered the Mar Theodore Church, damaging it and stealing Church items. More than 100 government soldiers and 100 rebels, including 80 jihadists from ISIS and al-Nusra, were killed in the fighting. Foreign rebel fighters were also among the dead. The rebels retreated to the surrounding farmland, with the military in pursuit, and the government news agency reported that the militants had vandalized Sadad's Saint Theodor Church and much of its infrastructure.

The 2015 Qamishli bombings occurred on 30 December in an Assyrian neighborhood of Qamishli, Syria. Three explosions, including at least one suicide bombing, killed 16 people (14 Assyrian Christians and 2 Muslims) and wounded 35. The Islamic State claimed responsibility, though some Assyrian organizations suggested Kurdish YPG involvement.

== Iran ==
In 1578, a Kurdish force of 10,000 attacked the city of Urmia in Iran, killing, looting, and carrying off over 1,000 Assyrian prisoners.

== Internal sectarianism ==
After the Simele massacre, Ignatius Aphrem I took an avid anti-Assyrian stance, and undertook a campaign to remove any mentions of Assyrians within the Syriac Orthodox Church. Similar initiatives were undertaken by Julius Yeshu Çiçek, who removed Assyrian mentions in various book publications. In recent times, clergymen in the church have supported an Aramean identity out of an anti-Assyrian stance. Said support has developed into a vocal and sectarian form of anti-Assyrian sentiment. The same phenomenon has been observed with the Chaldean Catholic Church through support for a separate Chaldean identity.

In 1970s Sweden, a series of street brawls took place over the naming dispute, where one leading Assyrian activist was murdered. Plans were made by the Patriarchate to excommunicate 60 individuals for identifying as Assyrians, but these plans were cancelled. Various strategies were used by the Syrianer to weaken the Assyrian movement by 'othering' them using negative attributions and labels, such as taudikat, yatume (Syriac: ܝܰܬ݂ܡܶܐ, lit. 'orphans'), shide (Syriac: ܫ̈ܶܐܕܶܐ, lit. 'devils'), or mqabel di 'ito (Syriac: ܡܩܰܒܶܠ ܕܺܝ ܥܺܝܕܬܐ, lit. 'anti-church'). During the 2009 football season, supporters of Syrianska FC turned to violence against Assyriska FF in different actions. These actions included destroying the Assyrian flag, burning an Assyrian cultural association in an arson attack after an Assyriska FF victory, and the beating of an Assyriska FF player at a bar.

After the mid-1990s, declarations of Aramean identity appeared online. The website Arameans of Aram-Nahrin described Assyrians as 'bandits', 'apostates', and 'criminals' committing spiritual genocide on the Aramean nation. Andreas Schmoller of the University of Salzburg has also previously described the website as anti-Assyrian.

Before the 2018 Iraqi parliamentary elections, various secular Chaldean and Syriac politicians who ran on Assyrian lists reported receiving harassment from members of their churches because they identified as Assyrians. A Chaldean candidate's children were harassed and told their father was a race traitor, while hate speech also circulated online.

In 2024, Assyrian-American comedian Paul Elia spoke out about how he had received a death threat from the Chaldean owner of a home renovations company in Toronto before a scheduled performance for stating that Chaldeans are ethnically Assyrian. Elia, who is Chaldean himself, has previously been open about Assyrian identity and has emphasized unity and a greater understanding of his heritage amongst his community, yet he has also discussed how he began to feel more ostracized among Chaldo-Assyrians in Detroit after speaking out about the naming dispute.

In early 2026, Chaldean Catholic Archbishop of Kirkuk Yousif Thomas Mirkis made a series of disparaging remarks towards the Assyrian Empire during the Fast of Nineveh season. The remarks were greatly criticized by the Assyrian community, including Dr. Efrem Yildiz of the University of Salamanca.

== Denial of continuity ==
Denial of Assyrian continuity is considered greatly offensive to Assyrians today. In a 2022 article, Sargon Donabed also wrote that denial of Assyrian continuity constitutes a normalization and propagation of epistemic violence against Assyrians in academia, manifested in ways such as scare quotes in Syriac studies and reducing Assyrians to being defined as solely "Nestorians" from Hakkari.

Contenders for Syriac-Aramean identity argue on the basis of denying Assyrian continuity, insinuating that Assyrian identity was an invention of the British Empire.

A distinct position argued by Arbella Bet-Shlimon is that debates over racial continuity of modern ethnic groups have long been discredited in other cases, but continue to be applied to Assyrians to deny their indigeneity and distinctiveness.

== See also ==
- Anti-Armenian sentiment
- Simko Shikak
- Simele Massacre
- Anfal campaign
- 2015 Qamishli bombings
- 2008 attacks on Christians in Mosul
- 2010 Baghdad church massacre

== Bibliography ==
- Atto, Naures (5 October 2011). Hostages in the Homeland, Orphans in the Diaspora: Identity Discourses Among the Assyrian/Syriac Elites in the European Diaspora (First published as dissertation, republished in a book format). Leiden University Press. ISBN 9789087281489.
- Bet-Shlimon, Arbella (21 April 2026). ""Propaganda of the Victims": Atrocity Denial, Ethnic Nationalism, and the Disparagement of Assyrians in Middle East Studies". Review of Middle East Studies. Cambridge University Press. doi:10.1017/rms.2026.10037.
- Donabed, Sargon G.; Mako, Shamiran (2009). "Ethno-cultural and Religious Identity of Syrian Orthodox Christians" (PDF). Chronos: Revue d'Histoire de l'Université de Balamand. 19: 69–111. Archived (PDF) from the original on 27 January 2021.
- Donabed, Sargon (August 2022). "The Existential Threat of Academic Bias: The Institutionalization of Anti-Assyrian Rhetoric". International Journal of Middle East Studies. 54 (3): 547–553. doi:10.1017/S0020743822000770. eISSN 1471-6380.
- Gaunt, David (9 December 2010). "Identity Conflicts among Oriental Christians in Sweden" (PDF). Sens Public. doi:10.7202/1064038ar. ISSN 2104-3272.
- Hanna, Reine; Joseph, Max (27 November 2018). Iraq's Stolen Election: How Assyrian Representation Became Assyrian Repression (PDF) (Report). Assyrian Policy Institute.
- Makko, Aryo (19 July 2017). "The Assyrian "concept of unity" after Seyfo" (PDF). The Assyrian Genocide: Cultural and Political Legacies (1st ed.). London. pp. 239–253. doi:10.4324/9781315269832. ISBN 9781315269832.
- Schmoller, Andreas (2020). "The Syriac Orthodox and Coptic Orthodox Churches in Austria: Inter-Church Relations and State Recognition". Mashriq & Mahjar: Journal of Middle East and North African Migration. 8 (1). Moise A. Khayrallah Center for Lebanese Diaspora Studies: 76–102. ISSN 2169-4435.
- Wozniak-Bobinska, Marta (6 May 2020). "Far from Aram-Nahrin: The Suryoye Diaspora Experience". In Eamer, Allyson (ed.). Border Terrains: World Diasporas in the 21st Century. Brill. pp. 73–83. ISBN 978-1-84888-117-4.
