= Battle of Erzurum =

The Battle of Erzurum may refer to:

- Battle of Erzurum (1552), Persians defeat Turks during the Ottoman–Persian War
- Battle of Erzurum (1877), Turks defend the city during the Russo-Turkish War
- Battle of Erzurum (1916), Russians defeat Turks during World War I
