= Izz al-Din Shir =

Kurdish founder of the Emirate of Hakkâri (d. 1423)

Emir of Hakkâri
- Reign: By 1384 – 1423
- Successor: Malik Muhammad
- Died: 1423
- Spouse: Pasha Khatun of Bitlis
- Issue: Malik Muhammad; Sultan Ahmad; Baha al-Din
- House: Hakkari dynasty Artsruni dynasty (possibly)
- Father: Malik Izz al-Din
- Religion: Sunni Islam

Izz al-Din Shir or Yezdanşêr (Kurdish: Êzdîn Şêr; died 1423) was the Kurdish founder of the Emirate of Hakkâri, which ruled an area in the region of Hakkari to the southeast of Lake Van (in what is now Turkey) up until 1845.

== Background ==
Izz al-Din Shir was described historically as being "of the line of Senek'erim", referring to Senekerim-Hovhannes Artsruni, the final ruler of the Kingdom of Vaspurakan. Given Shir's Kurdish heritage, it is likely that this Armenian ancestry was matrilineal, i.e. his mother or grandmother may have been an Artsrunid princess. Such intermarriages between Christian Armenian nobles and Kurdish Muslim ruling families were not uncommon due to the mutual political benefits they provided. Alternatively, Armenians have been known to refer to other Armenians who had converted to Islam as “Kurds”. It may therefore be that Izz al-Din Shir simply belonged to an Islamized branch of the Artsrunid royal family.

His father may have been a certain Malik Izz al-Din, who had commissioned the Halima Khatun Mausoleum (likely for his mother) in Vostan in 1335.

== Life ==
The exact year in which Izz al-Din Shir began his reign is uncertain. In 1384, he appears to have been allied with Sultan Ahmad of the Jalairid Sultanate. Sultan Ahmad, then threatened by both Qara Mahammad of the Qara Qoyunlu and Tokhtamysh, Khan of the Golden Horde, was led to safety by Shir through the latter's domains to the Jalairid capital of Baghdad.

In 1387, Izz al-Din Shir was besieged at a fortress in Tushpa by the forces of the Central Asian conqueror Timur. He was later captured and bound by Timur, who allegedly had many of the defenders of the stronghold enslaved or executed. Shir himself was spared and later had his authority restored under Timurid suzerainty.

In 1392, Shir had the province of Vostan captured from his brother Malik Assad. The following year, the Catholicos of Aghtamar, Zak'aria II, was stoned to death on his orders.

Now as Timur's ally, Shir began assisting the conqueror in his wars against Qara Muhammad's son Qara Yusuf. In 1395, he was recorded as having engaged the Qara Qoyunlu forces for several days, in reward for which he was awarded lands by Timur. He also supported Timur in his campaign against Mardin which at the time was ruled by the Aq Qoyunlu. However in 1398, he was captured by Qara Yusuf, who had him imprisoned on Akdamar Island whilst he ransacked his lands including the fortress of Diz and his capital of Julamerk. By the time of Timur's death in 1405 and the subsequent weakening of Timurid authority, Shir had switched allegiance to Qara Yusuf. Though he seems to have disliked the Turkomans, he is recorded to have acted as an intermediary during a dispute between them and the Shirvanshahs. By 1412, Izz al-Din Shir had begun surrendering his rule to his son, Malik Muhammad, on account of his advanced age. However, he still appears to have been the Hakkari ruler de jure, with Armenian scribes continuing to refer to Malik Muhammad under his father's name.

When Timur's successor Shah Rukh reconquered the region in 1421, Izz al-Din Shir was among the nobles and dignitaries who visited him in his winter quarters in Karabakh to offer their fealty. Malik Muhammad did the same soon after when the conqueror visited the Lake Van region. When Qara Yusuf's son Qara Iskander temporarily regained control of the area, Shir refused to recognise his rule, a policy followed by his successors. Izz al-Din Shir died two years later, in 1423.

== Bibliography ==
- Album, S. (1976). A Hoard of Silver Coins from the Time of Iskandar Qarā-Qoyūnlū. The Numismatic Chronicle. Vol. 16. Royal Numismatic Society.
- Khachatrian, Alexander (2003). "The Kurdish Principality of Hakkariya (14th-15th Centuries)". Iran & the Caucasus. 7 (1/2): 37–58. ISSN 1609-8498. JSTOR 4030969.
- Minorsky, Vladimir (1978). The Turks, Iran and the Caucasus in the Middle Ages. Variorum Reprints. ISBN 978-0-86078-028-1.
- Sanjian, Avedis K. (5 February 1969). Colophons of Armenian Manuscripts, 1301-1480, A Source for Middle Eastern History (PDF). Cambridge, Massachusetts: Harvard University Press. ISBN 9780674432611. OCLC 54310.
- Sinclair, T. A. (1987). Eastern Turkey: An Architectural and Archaeological Survey. Pindar Press. ISBN 978-0-907132-32-5.
- Thomas of Metsoph (1987). The History of Tamerlane and His Successors. Translated by Robert Bedrosian.
