= Hakkâri (city) =

City in southwestern Turkey

- Municipality
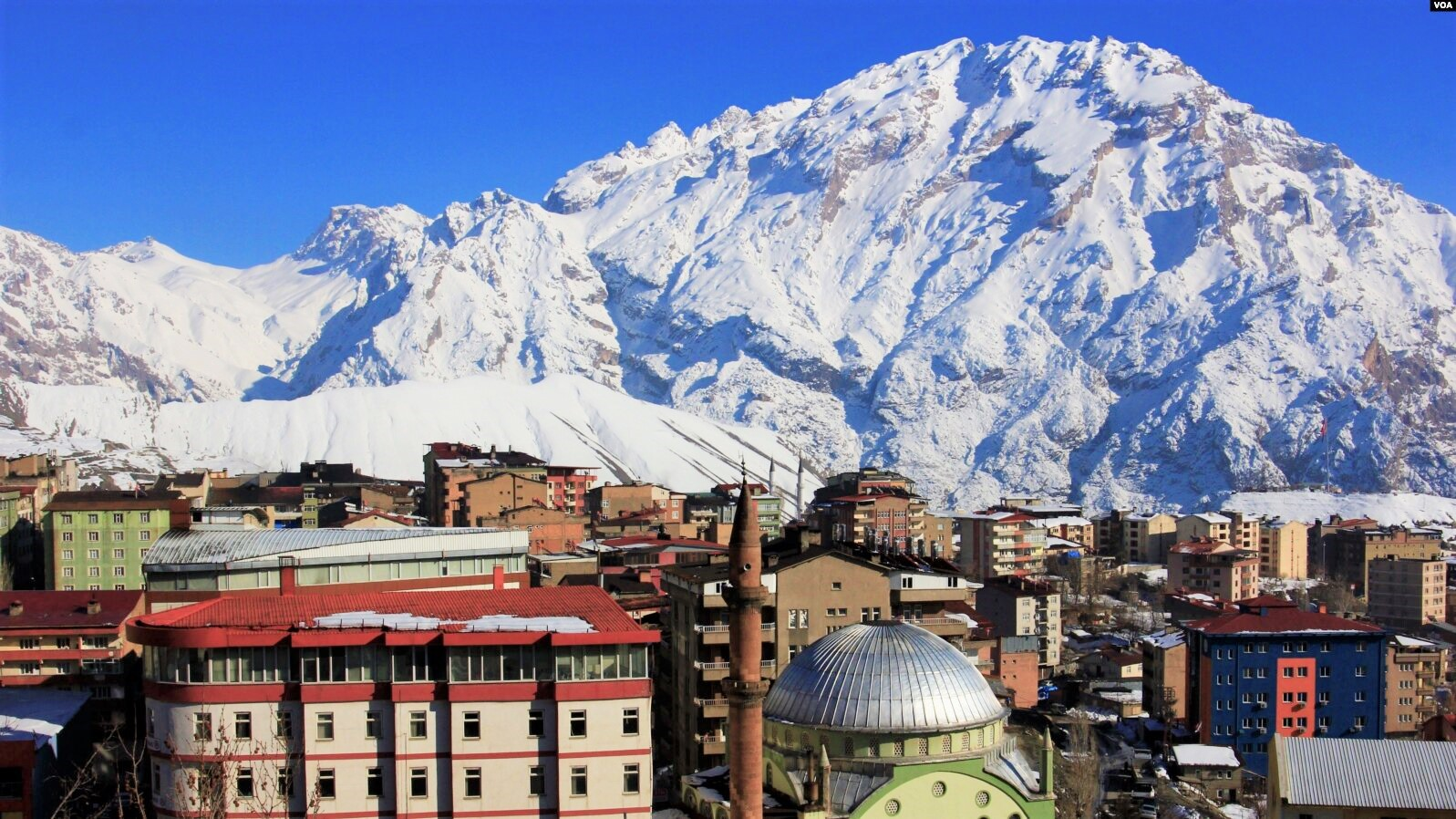
- Hakkâri

- Coat of arms

- Location within Turkey
- Coordinates: 37.577°N 43.739°E
- Country: Turkey
- Province: Hakkâri
- District: Hakkâri
- Elevation: 1,720 m (5,640 ft)
- Population (2023): 58,470
- Time zone: UTC+3 (TRT)

Hakkâri (Turkish pronunciation: [hacːaːɾi]), formerly known as Julamerk (Turkish: Çölemerik, Kurdish: Çolemêrg, Armenian: Ջղմար, romanized: Jghmar), is a city and the seat of Hakkâri District in the Hakkâri Province of Turkey. The city is populated by Kurds and had a population of 58,470 in 2023.

It is located about 40 km (25 mi) from the Iraq–Turkey border, but the distance to the nearest Iraqi border crossing (Ibrahim Khalil border crossing) by road is about 270 km (170 mi)

== Etymology ==
According to medieval and most of modern scholars, Hakkâri is named after a local Kurdish tribe called Hakkâri. The name Hakâriyye was used to refer to the surrounding region as early as 639, during the Muslim conquests. Çölemerik is the older name of the city, while Hakkâri referred to the larger mountainous region in which the city is located. In the republican period, Çölemerik came to be replaced by Hakkâri for both the province and the city. The older name appears as Gûlârmak in Syriac sources. The Armenian Dictionary of Toponymy of Armenia and Adjacent Territories identifies the city with the ancient fortress of Jlmar.

== Neighborhoods ==
The city is divided into the neighborhoods of Bağlar, Berçelan, Biçer, Bulak, Dağgöl, Gazi, Halife Derviş, Karşıyaka, Keklikpınar, Kıran, Medrese, Merzan, Pehlivan, Sümbül and Yeni.

== History ==
=== Hakkari kurgan stelae ===
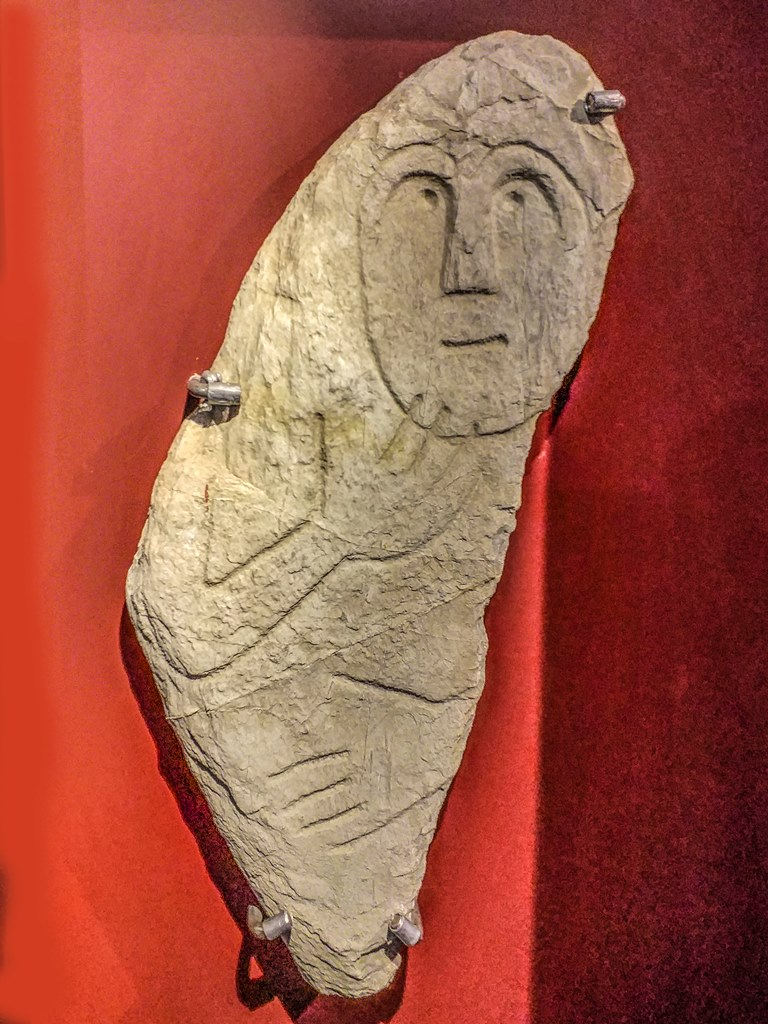
A Hakkari kurgan stele

Thirteen Kurgan stelae, never before seen in Anatolia or the Near East, were found in 1998 in their original location at the centre of Hakkari. The stelae were carved on upright flagstone-like slabs measuring between 0.7 m to 3.10 m in height. The stones contain only one cut surface, upon which human figures are chiseled. The theme of each stele reveals the foreview of an upper human body. The legs are not represented. Eleven of the stelae depict naked warriors with daggers, spears, and axes—masculine symbols of war. They always hold a drinking vessel made of skin in both hands. Two stelae contain female figures without arms. The stelae may have been carved by different craftsmen using different techniques. Stylistic differences shift from bas relief to a more systematic linearity. The earliest stelae are in the style of bas relief while the latest ones are in a linear style. They were made during a period from the fifteenth century BC to the eleventh century BC in Hakkâri. Stelae with this type of relief are not common in the ancient Near East however there are many close parallels between these and those produced by a variety of peoples from the Eurasian steppes between the third millennium BC and the eleventh century AD. They are now on display in the Van Museum.

=== Hubushkia ===
Hubushkia was an Iron Age kingdom located between the Urartian and Assyrian spheres of influence. The exact location of Hubushkia is unknown, but scholars suggest that the kingdom of Hubushkia was centred on the headwaters of the Great Zab River, in what is now Hakkâri Province in Eastern Anatolia, Turkey.

=== World War I and Assyrian genocide ===
In October 1914, the Ottoman government ordered the deportation of Christians from the Hakkâri region. After the outbreak of war, Turkish troops, helped by Kurdish irregulars, systematically destroyed Christian villages in the region, killing many Assyrian civilians. Assyrians in Çölemerik were arrested or killed. The remaining Assyrians of Hakkâri took refuge in the mountains and then fled towards Iranian territory. 25,000 had reportedly reached Salmas, north of Urmia, by September 1915. An estimated total of 40,000 Assyrians from Hakkâri eventually reached Urmia.

Çölemerik was briefly occupied by Russian troops in December 1914 and for a longer period after May 1915. It was retaken by Turkish forces on 22 April 1918. The town had been reduced to a ruin over the course of the war. Its population was only 801 in 1927, whereas in the late 19th century it had hosted a population of about 3,000.

=== Republican period ===
Hakkâri was rebuilt in 1935 and later became the administrative center of the province of Hakkâri. The population of the town grew more significantly after 1975, when it surpassed 10,000, thanks to migration from the surrounding area.

== Sport ==
The women's football club Hakkarigücü Spor was promoted to the Women's First League to take part in the 2018–19 season after finishing the 2017–18 Second League season as runners-up.

== Notable people ==
- Evdilsemedê Babek (972–1019), Kurdish poet
- Abu'l-Hayja al-Hakkari (12th century), Kurdish ruler and tribal chief
- Isa al-Hakkari (12th century), Ayyubid Kurdish commander
- Mela Huseynê Bateyî (1417–1495), Kurdish poet and cleric
- Izz al-Din Shir (1384–1453), famous founder of the Emirate of Hakkâri
- Çelik Gülersoy (1930–2006), Turkish lawyer of Kurdish descent
- Yılmaz Erdoğan (born 1967), film actor, activist, poet
- Pervin Buldan (born 1967), Turkish politician of Kurdish origin

== Population ==
Population history of the municipality from 1997 to 2023:

Population
Year	Pop.	±%
1997	57,077	—
2007	57,954	+1.5%
2012	58,584	+1.1%
2017	56,800	−3.0%
2022	60,098	+5.8%
2023	58,470	−2.7%

== Climate ==
Hakkâri has a warm-summer, Mediterranean-influenced humid continental climate (Köppen climate classification: Dsa, Trewartha climate classification: Dca). Hakkari city is at an elevation of around 1720 meters (5640 feet) and is surrounded by higher elevations nearby. The winters are cold and snowy with an average of −4 °C (23 °F). Summers are warm and dry with an average of 25 °C (76 °F).

Highest recorded temperature:38.8 °C (101.8 °F) on 27 July 1966
Lowest recorded temperature:−23.4 °C (−10.1 °F) on 3 January 2009

Climate data for Hakkâri (1991–2020, extremes 1961–2022)
Month	Jan	Feb	Mar	Apr	May	Jun	Jul	Aug	Sep	Oct	Nov	Dec	Year
Record high °C (°F)	11.8 (53.2)	12.9 (55.2)	19.7 (67.5)	25.0 (77.0)	30.7 (87.3)	34.4 (93.9)	38.8 (101.8)	38.0 (100.4)	37.1 (98.8)	29.3 (84.7)	20.8 (69.4)	17.5 (63.5)	38.8 (101.8)
Mean daily maximum °C (°F)	−0.5 (31.1)	1.3 (34.3)	7.0 (44.6)	13.2 (55.8)	19.6 (67.3)	26.3 (79.3)	31.1 (88.0)	31.5 (88.7)	26.7 (80.1)	19.0 (66.2)	10.0 (50.0)	2.5 (36.5)	15.6 (60.1)
Daily mean °C (°F)	−4.1 (24.6)	−2.6 (27.3)	2.7 (36.9)	8.6 (47.5)	14.4 (57.9)	20.5 (68.9)	25.0 (77.0)	25.2 (77.4)	20.7 (69.3)	13.6 (56.5)	5.5 (41.9)	−1.2 (29.8)	10.7 (51.3)
Mean daily minimum °C (°F)	−7.5 (18.5)	−6.2 (20.8)	−1.2 (29.8)	4.2 (39.6)	9.6 (49.3)	14.7 (58.5)	18.7 (65.7)	18.8 (65.8)	14.5 (58.1)	8.3 (46.9)	1.3 (34.3)	−4.6 (23.7)	5.9 (42.6)
Record low °C (°F)	−23.4 (−10.1)	−22.7 (−8.9)	−19.0 (−2.2)	−8.3 (17.1)	−0.8 (30.6)	5.0 (41.0)	10.0 (50.0)	9.7 (49.5)	4.3 (39.7)	−5.8 (21.6)	−15.0 (5.0)	−21.3 (−6.3)	−23.4 (−10.1)
Average precipitation mm (inches)	90.8 (3.57)	102.3 (4.03)	119.2 (4.69)	119.0 (4.69)	68.9 (2.71)	14.5 (0.57)	9.3 (0.37)	5.4 (0.21)	10.9 (0.43)	56.2 (2.21)	78.1 (3.07)	102.7 (4.04)	777.0 (30.59)
Average precipitation days	10.83	10.53	12.67	12.83	12.13	4.00	2.03	1.27	2.13	8.37	8.63	10.30	95.8
Average relative humidity (%)	72	70.1	63.5	57.8	51.3	38.9	33.6	30.8	33.8	49.6	60.1	69.8	52.5
Mean monthly sunshine hours	120.5	143.8	178.7	197.7	266.4	342.4	368.9	339.0	293.8	222.2	158.6	112.3	2,744.3
Mean daily sunshine hours	3.9	5.1	5.8	6.6	8.6	11.4	11.9	11.0	9.8	7.2	5.3	3.6	7.6
Source 1: Turkish State Meteorological Service
Source 2: NCEI(humidity, sun 1991-2020)

== Sister cities ==
In addition, Hakkâri was twinned with:

- Boden, Sweden

== See also ==
- 1930 Hakkari earthquake
- 2010 Hakkâri bus attack
- 2011 Hakkâri attack
- Emirate of Hakkâri
- Massacres of Badr Khan
- Hakkari Cilo-Sat Mountains National Park
