= Hakkâri dynasty =

Kurdish emirate (?-1847)

Hakkâri dynasty Hekarî (Kurdish)
- Before 1380s–1847
- Capital: Hakkâri
- Common languages: Kurdish
- Government: Emirate
- Emir
- History
  - Established: Before 1380s
  - Disestablished: 1847
Succeeded by
Ottoman Empire
- Today part of: Hakkâri Province; Van Province; Iraq

The Hakkâri dynasty or the Emirate of Hakkâri (Kurdish: Hekarî) was a Kurdish emirate centered around the city of Hakkâri, and to the west of Lake Urmia on the border with Iran, which ruled a wide variety of peoples.

The dynasty lasted from the 14th century until 1845, when internal disputes resulted in it briefly coming under the patronage of the last Kurdish Emirate of Botan, led by Bedir Khan Beg. Eventually both were absorbed into the Ottoman Empire following the Tanzimat reforms which reorganised and centralised the state.

== Territory ==
The Hakkari emirate ruled over Julamenk, Vostan, Khoshab, Tosp, Urmia, Van and Berkni. In 16th-18th century, the Emirate broke up into several smaller fiefdom ruling over the provinces independent from each other. the Emirate bordered Bohtan from the west, and Bidlis from north west.

== History ==
The first known emir Hakkari was Abu'l-Hayja ibn Abdullah ibn Abu Khalil ibn Marzuban Al-Hakkari, better known by Abu'l-Hayja Al-Hakkari (died 1143).

=== Origins ===
Already established by the 1380s, the founder of the emirate was Izz al-din Shir, a Kurdish noble, allegedly said to have descended from the Armenian Artsruni dynasty by some Armenian Authors. Another view taken that the rulers of Hakkari were Arabs descended from the Abbasid dynasty. In Sharafnama, Sharaf Khan Bidlisi states that the lineage of the Hakkari rulers went back to the Abbasid caliphs, and that this family distinguished itself among the Kurdish rulers for its noble origin, elevated lineage, refined manners, and good conduct. Bidlisi records nine Abbasid rulers from this family, not including their descendants. Shir reigned until 1423, having maintained his rule by switching his allegiance variously between the Timurids and the Qara Qoyunlu. Many of his sons and grandsons were later captured or executed by the Qara Qoyunlu Sultan, Qara Iskander.

The emirate was re-established by a descendant of Shir named Asad al-din Zarin Cang. Summoned by the Christians of the region from his residence in Egypt, Zarin Cang and his followers stormed and captured his ancestral lands. As this assault occurred on a Saturday (‘’shembe’’ in the local Kurdish dialect), the ruling family was renamed the Shambo dynasty. Zarin Cang’s son, Izz al-din Shir II later came into conflict with the Aq Qoyunlu and was killed in 1491 under the orders of its ruler, Sultan Yaqub.

The allegiance of the Hakkâri rulers fluctuated between different overlords in subsequent years. Lying on the border between two powerful warring empires, the Ottomans and the Safavids, the Emirs were able to play the interests of one great power against another by simply switching sides, beginning with Izz al-din Shir II’s son, Zahid Beg. The following period was turbulent, with much inter-familial conflict in the ruling family. Different members sided with different empires and rebellions were launched by Shambo princes against their fathers. Thirteen different emirs were crowned within the space of a century. After the Ottoman-Safavid wars, the Hakkari no longer had the ability to manoeuvre their Ottoman overlords to their advantage and began to lose power and status.

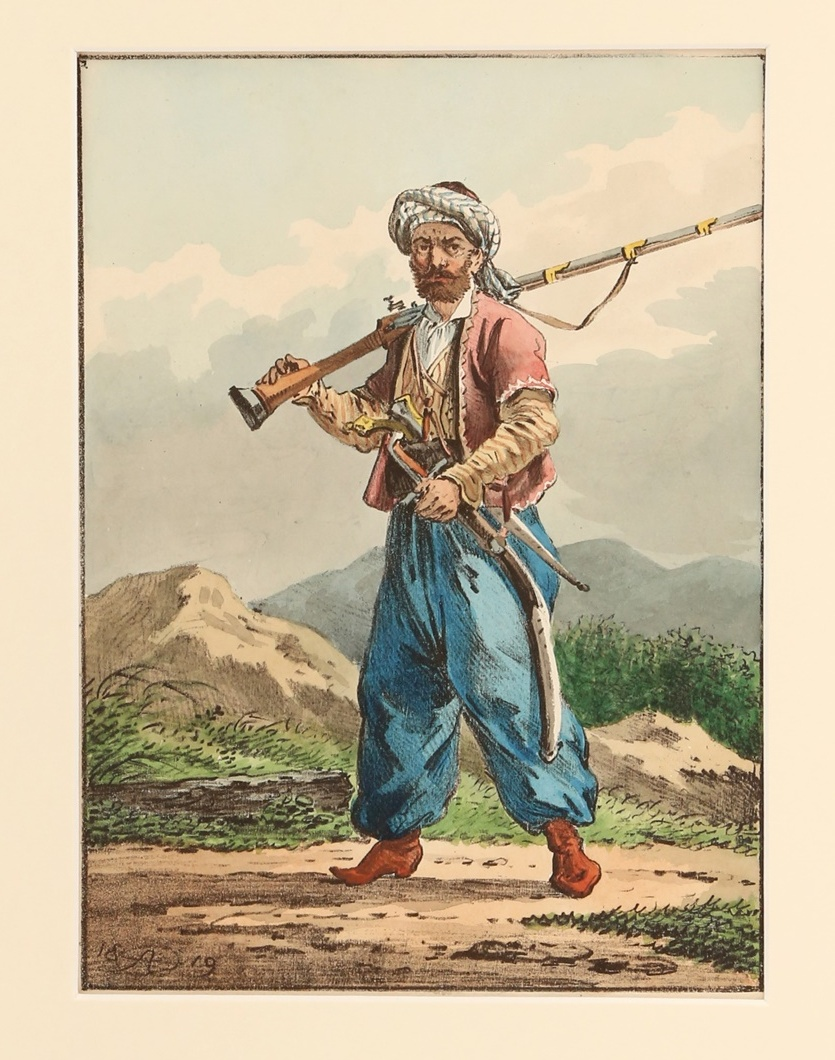
A portrait of a Kurdish fighter from the Hakkâri region. Aleksander Orłowski, Saint Petersburg, Russia, c. 1819 or after

In the 1820s, the Emirate of Hakkâri was consumed by a conflict between Nurullah Beg and Suleiman Beg. Assyrian tribes took sides, with the patriarch Mar Shinum throwing his support behind Suleiman Beg. The influence of Western missionaries and their associated governments also unbalanced the religious equilibrium between Christian and Muslim tribes at a time when the Ottoman state was weakened by wars with Russia in 1828-29 and Egyptian ruler Muhammed Ali in 1831.

At the beginning of the nineteenth century, Hakkari was also threatened from the south through Rawanduz. In 1813, Mir Muhammad of Rawanduz became the ruler of the Soran Emirate and quickly strengthened his authority over the surrounding tribes. Taking advantage of the weakness of the Ottoman governors, he extended his control over parts of Hakkari, Baban and Bahdinan. According to some accounts, his power grew to such an extent that the ruler of Hakkari was reduced to the position of an ordinary servant.

Emir Nurullah Beg of Hakkâri and Bedir Khan Beg massacred the Nestorian Assyrians within their lands in 1843 following the encouragement of the Ottoman authorities, who associated them with the growing influence of Western missionaries and of Britain and Russia. Subsequently, the Ottomans attempted to exert their authority over the Kurdish statelets, resulting in a confrontation between the Ottoman military and the Bedir Khan Kurdish coalition in 1847. The Kurdish tribes were defeated, and Bedir Khan sent into exile.

== Population ==
At the height of its power, the emirate controlled parts of Turkish provinces of Hakkari, and Van, along with some areas in northern Iraq. The population was heterogeneous, with pastoral Kurdish tribes, Nestorian Assyrian Christians who were vassals of the Kurdish tribes, and settled Armenian farmers. The emirate did not have control or jurisdiction over the independent Assyrian tribes of Tyari, Baz, Jilu, Tkhouma, and Diz which were known as ashirets, or free men.
