= Fall of Fort Tafet =

1916 military operation of the Caucasus Campaign

- Part of the Erzurum offensive of the Caucasus campaign
Date	11–15 February 1916
Location	Gürcü-boğaz Pass, Erzurum, Ottoman Empire
Result	Decisive Russian breakthrough

Belligerents
Russian Empire	Ottoman Empire

Commanders and leaders
Nikolai Yudenich; General Przevalski	Mahmut Kamil Pasha

Strength
3 Rifle Divisions	Ottoman X Corps (3 divisions)

Casualties and losses
Unknown	1,500 POWs, 20 guns

The Fall of Fort Tafet was a decisive military engagement during the storm of Erzurum in February 1916, resulting in a Russian breakthrough of the Ottoman defensive lines protecting Erzurum. The capture of this fort opened the southern exit of the Gürcü-boğaz Pass, nullifying the strategic value of the fortress's outer defensive ring.

== Background ==
Fort Tafet and the nearby Fort Kara-göbek were purpose-built fortifications designed to cover the northern and southern entrances of the Gürcü-boğaz Pass. This pass served as the primary "northern gate" into the Erzurum plain, linking the Tortum-çay valley to the Kara-su river.

General Nikolai Yudenich formulated a plan to bypass the "impregnable" central Deve-boyun ridge by launching a multi-pronged assault through this defile, coordinated with a high-altitude flanking movement over the Kargapazar ridge.

== Russian breakthrough ==
The assault began on February 11, 1916. While the Russian 39th Division pinned down the Ottoman reserves at Deve-boyun, the Turkistan rifle regiments moved to isolate the northern forts. By February 12, the Russian forces had captured the abandoned Fort Kara-göbek.

On February 14, Fort Tafet was attacked simultaneously from three sides by the 17th Turkistanskis, Don Foot battalions, and the 13th Caucasian Rifles. The fall of the fort and the capture of 1,500 prisoners and 20 guns shattered the Ottoman defensive cohesion.

== Aftermath ==
The breakthrough at Tafet allowed the Russian 4th Caucasian Rifle Division to reach the rim of the Kara-su plain by the evening of February 14. With their northern flank turned, the Ottoman Third Army was forced to abandon the entire Erzurum perimeter. On February 16, Russian forces entered the city of Erzurum.
