= Three Kumbets =

Coordinates: 39°54′14″N 41°16′43″E

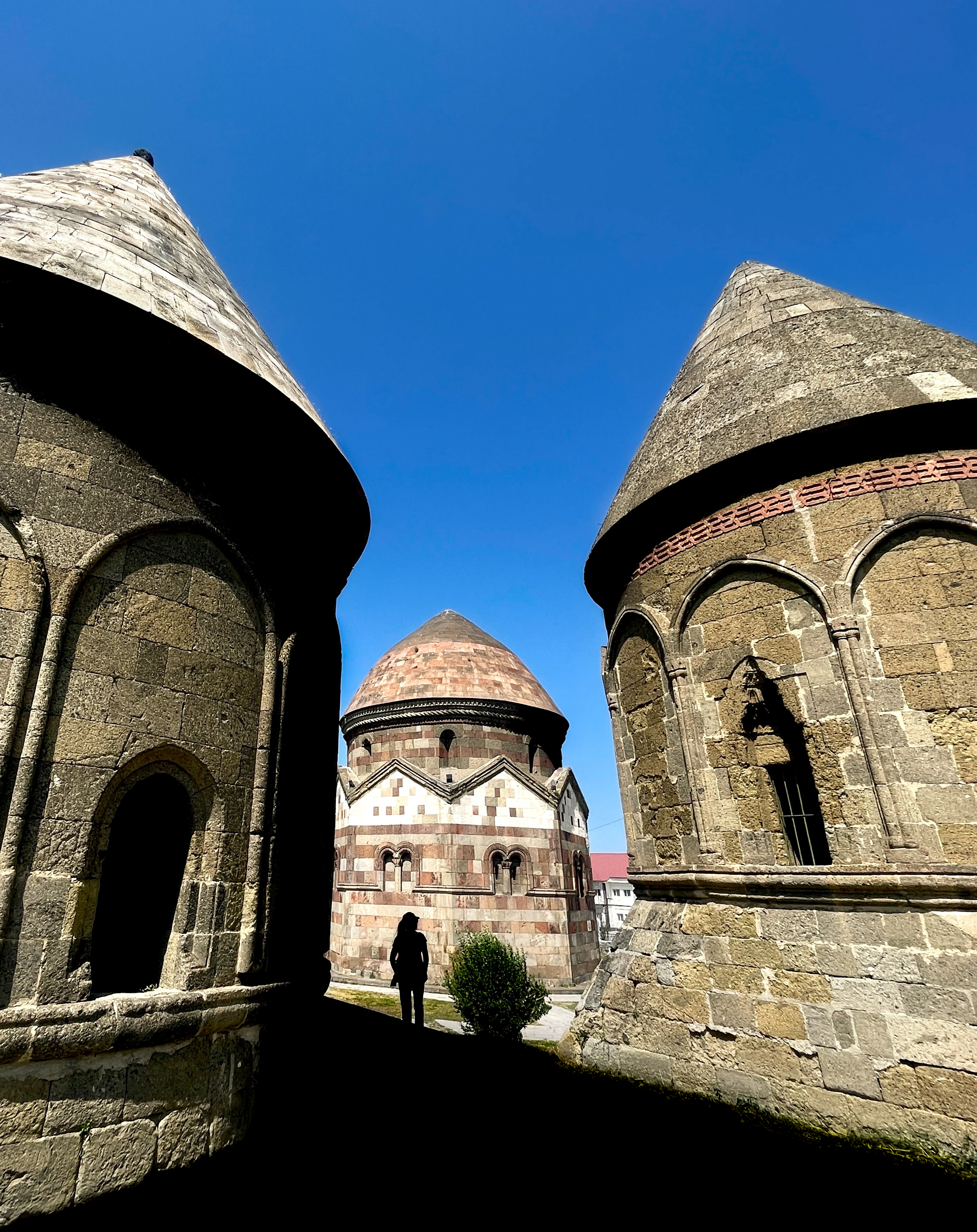
- Interactive map of the Three Kumbets area

General information
- Location: Erzurum, Turkey
- Completed: 12th–14th century

The Three Kumbets (Turkish: Üç Kümbetler) are a historic funerary complex of three kumbets in Erzurum, Turkey, built between the 12th and 14th centuries by the Seljuk Turks.

== History ==
The Three Kumbets were built by the Seljuks, a Turkic dynasty that ruled eastern Anatolia in the 10th–12th centuries. It was built on the site of a large Muslim cemetery that housed the city's important scholars and families. However, over time, the cemetery was abandoned, and the Three Kumbets are all that remain.

== Description ==
Believed to be one of the most significant examples of tomb and mausoleum architecture among Anatolian monuments, the Three Kumbets likely serve as the final resting place for statesmen or scholars. While it is established that the largest of the kumbets—constructed in the 12th century—was built in honor of Emir Saltuk, it is acknowledged that no scholarly consensus has yet been reached regarding the other smaller cupolas, which were likely constructed in the 14th century. Although the architectural styles and construction methods of each of the three kumbets exhibit distinctive characteristics, their close proximity to one another suggests that they were commissioned individually for specific persons. Furthermore, the resemblance of their roof structures reinforces the hypothesis that they served as monumental tombs dedicated to statesmen who lived during that era.

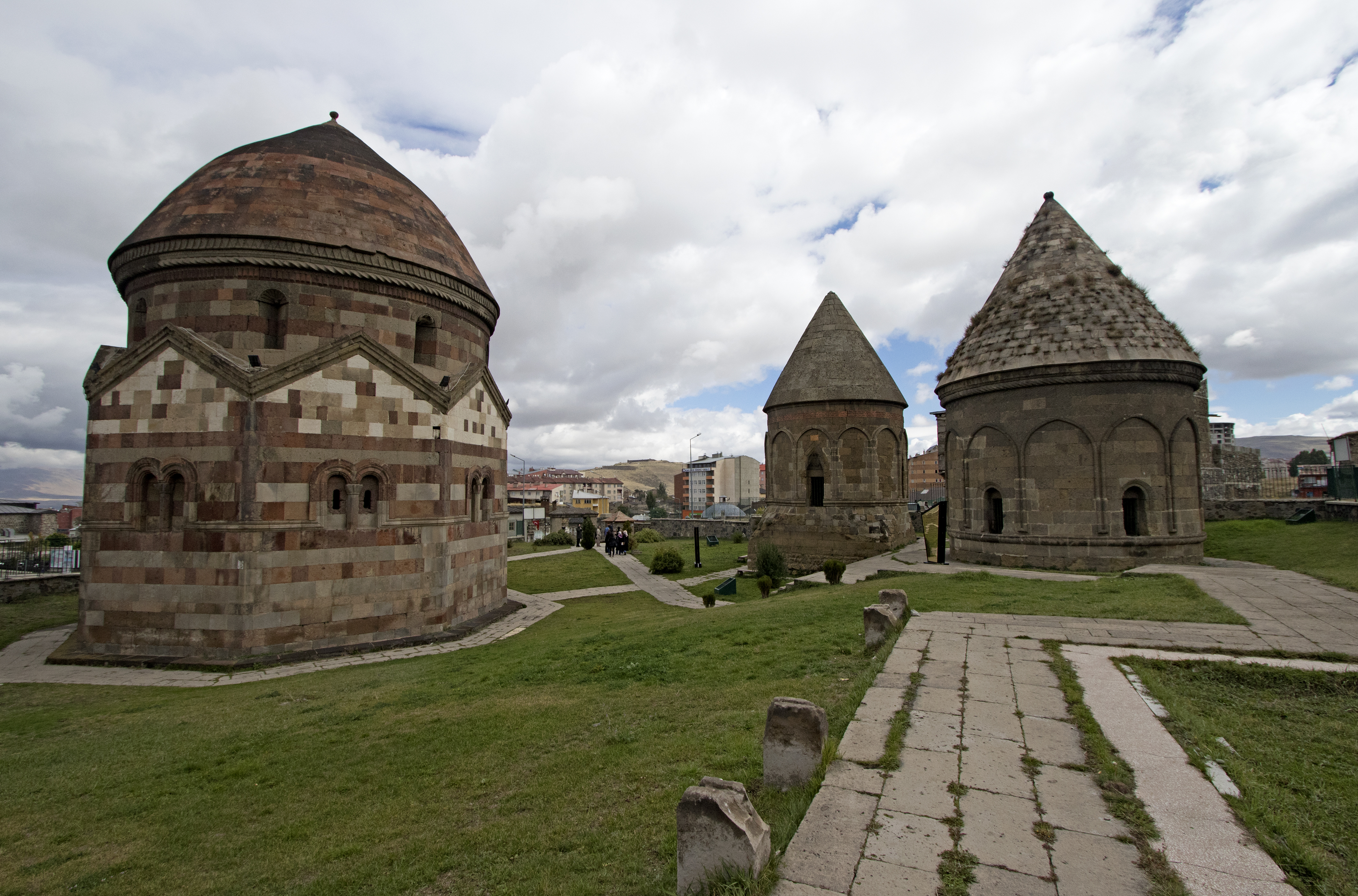
A view of the Three Kumbets

== Kumbet of Emir Saltuk ==
Constructed in the 12th century, the kumbet of Emir Saltuk is the earliest dated kumbet in Anatolia. It features an octagonal body, a tall drum and a low-pitched conical roof. Built using two-toned ashlar masonry, the kumbet features triangular pediments with round arches; within the niches of the drum, there are relief carvings of animals such as bulls, snakes, bats, and eagles. Particularly noteworthy is a human head figure situated between the horns of a bull within one of the niches found on the kumbet.

== Location ==
The Three Kumbets are located in downtown historic Erzurum. They are near the Erzurum castle and south of the Double Minaret Madrasa. Across the street from the Three Kumbets is the Erzurum Museum.
