= Battle of Erzurum (1552) =

16th c. military conflict

- Part of Ottoman–Safavid War (1532–1555)
Date	1552–1553
Location	Erzurum, Eastern Anatolia
Result	Safavid victory

Belligerents
Safavid Iran	Ottoman Empire

Commanders and leaders
Ismail Mirza	Iskender Pasha

Battle of Erzurum (Persian: نبرد ارزروم) refers to the campaign of Shah Tahmasp, the second ruler of Safavid Iran, which was carried out in response to the campaigns of Sultan Suleiman to the Safavid lands. The purpose of the campaign was to carry out plunder, obtain prisoners and force peace by destroying the rear of the Ottoman Empire.

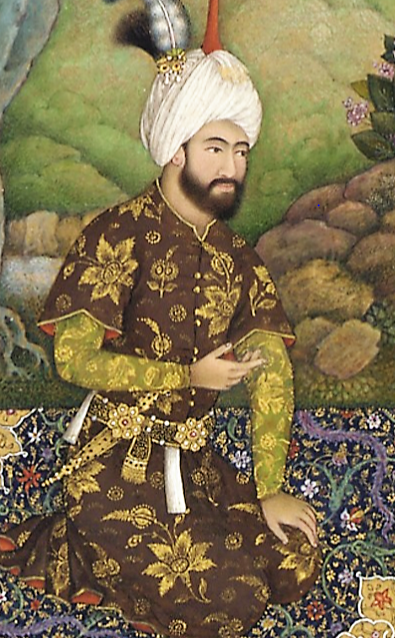
Tahmasp I in the mountains. Drawn by Farrukh Beg.

== Background ==
The Ottoman ruler Sultan Suleiman had made 3 marches (1534, 1535, 1548) to the Safavid lands before this march. During these campaigns, Tahmasp followed a different tactic in order to avoid an open battle against a large Ottoman army, and as a result, each time the Ottoman campaigns ended in failure, despite the huge costs incurred. As a result of these campaigns, the Ottoman Empire was able to hold only Baghdad and was forced to leave the remaining lands that it was captured each time. After Sultan Suleiman's campaign in 1548, Shah Tahmasp organized a campaign to the Ottoman territories and was closely assisted by his son Ismail Mirza.

== Campaign ==
In 1552, Tahmasp I started a march to Ottoman territories. The judge of Erzurum Iskender Pasha's march to Khoy territory became an excuse for this. In the summer of 1552, by the order of Shah Tahmasp, the gathering of troops began. They were divided into 4 parts and sent to four directions:

- Erchish and Barkiyya — (Masum bey Safavi, Allahgulu bey Ayjak oglu, Ali Sultan Tekali, Shamseddin Khan Bidlisi, Khalifa Ansar, Hamza bey Talish, Ulughkhan bey Saadli, etc.).
- Pasin (son of Shahverdi Sultan Ziyad and Adham Bey Rumlu).
- Arab Iraq (Ibrahim Khan Zulqadar, Shahgulu Khan Afshar, Chirag Sultan).
- Davil (Bayram bey Qajar, Toygun bey Qajar and Keikhosrov, a vassal of the Georgian ruler Safavids).

Tahmasp I personally participated in this march, and the operational plan was prepared by him. As a result of the campaign, 30,000 sheep, 10,000 cattle, and 3,000 horses were captured in Ahlat territory. Ahlat Castle was razed to the ground. Houses and crops were destroyed in Van area. Bitlis, Vostan, Adiljavaz, Erchish, Mush, Pasin regions were put to the sword.

While Shah Tahmasp was successfully leading the campaign, he decided to punish the Ottoman ruler of Erzurum Iskender Pasha and assigned it to his son Ismail Mirza. Named amirs such as Karabakh judge Shahverdi Sultan Ziyad oglu, Badr Khan Ustagli, the judge of Chukhursaed Shahgulu Sultan Ustagli, Muhammad Khan Turkman from Mosul and "one thousand Tehran and six hundred Nakhchivan guards" participated in this march. Being confident in the numerical superiority of his forces (Turks and Kurds from Erzincan, Tarjan, Bayburt, Kemak, Maresh, Trabzon, Kurdistan and Georgia), Iskender Pasha decided to leave the fortress and enter into battle with Ismail Mirza. In the aforementioned battle of Erzurum, Iskender Pasha, who observed the growing pressure of the Qizilbashs on the left and right flanks, rushed forward, but fearing that he would be surrounded, he was forced to turn back. Meanwhile, Ismail Mirza was standing on a hill near the battlefield. The Ottomans could not continue the attack of the Qizilbashs and started to run towards the castle in panic. Many of them fell into the ditch around the Erzurum fortress. The trench was filled with men and horses. In the panic, the Ottomans forgot to lock the gates and the three Qizilbashs managed to enter the castle. 2576 Turks were killed in addition to those who fell into the ditch and died. Prominent Ottoman nobles Mustafa bey, the governor of Trabzon, Kabir Isa, the governor of Maresh Muhammad bey, the servant of the Sultan Ramazan bey, the brother of Iskender Pasha Kheyraddin bey, the judge of Malatya, and many others were captured.

Then Ismail Mirza came to the king's camp near Erchish. The soldiers of the military unit in the fortress killed the leader of the castle and surrendered the fortress to Qizilbashs. By the order of the Shah, the fortress was destroyed. Then the fortress of Bergiri was captured. Ismail left for Kurdistan. In this campaign, the Qizilbashs captured large booty (captives, goods, horses, mules and cattle). Shah returned from the Nakhchivan campaign in March–April 1553. In the same year, Tahmasp sent Emir Shamseddin Diljani to the sultan to negotiate peace. However, according to Hasan Beg Rumlu's writing, in the letter brought by the returning envoy, the sultan did not pay enough respect to the king of the "East and West" (i.e. Tahmasp I). In response, the Shah sent his son Ismail to Kurdistan with an army. They turned Van, Vostan, Archish and Adiljavaz into ruins and returned to the royal headquarters in Nakhchivan with the booty.

== Result ==
As a result of this campaign, great damage was done to the Ottoman lands in the Eastern Anatolia region, and these problems of the Ottoman army, which had already experienced logistical problems during the campaigns to the Safavid lands, increased even more. After the failure of the 1554 Ottoman campaign after this campaign, Suleiman started peace negotiations. As a result, the war between the two empires, which had been officially ongoing since 1514, was ended in 1555 by the Amasya Peace Treaty.

== See also ==
- Ottoman–Safavid War (1532–1555)

== Literature ==
- Roemer, H. R. (2008). "THE SAFAVID PERIOD". The Cambridge History of Iran - The Timurid and Safavid Periods. Cambridge: Cambridge University Press. pp. 189–350. ISBN 978-1139-05-498-0.
- Atchil, Zahit (2019). "Warfare as a Tool of Diplomacy: Background of the First Ottoman-Safavid Treaty in 1555". Turkish Historical Review. 10 (1). Leiden: Brill: 3–24. doi:10.1163/18775462-01001006. S2CID 198615063.
