= Kajazun Gyurjyan =

Armenian stage actor (1923–2022)

- Քաջազուն Գյուրջյան; Каджазун Гюрджян
- Born: 1 January 1923; Vostan, Armenian SSR, Transcaucasian SFSR
- Died: 13 February 2022 (aged 99); Artashat, Armenia
- Citizenship: Armenian
- Occupation: Actor

Kajazun Gyurjyan (Armenian: Քաջազուն Գյուրջյան; 1 January 1923 – 13 February 2022) was an Armenian stage actor.

== Life and career ==
Gyurjyan was born in the village of Vostan, Artashat Region on 1 January 1923, and graduated from the local secondary school. From 1941 to 1972 he was an actor at the Amo Kharazyan State Theater in Artashat, from 1974 to 1985 he was an actor at the Yerevan Young Audience Theater, and from 1995 he was an actor at the Hakob Paronyan State Theater of Musical Comedy.

He died in Artashat on 13 February 2022, at the age of 99.

== Awards ==
- Honored Artist of Armenia
- Medal of the 1st Degree for Services to the Motherland (2013)
