= Erzurum Castle =

Castle in Erzurum

- Erzurum Kalesi
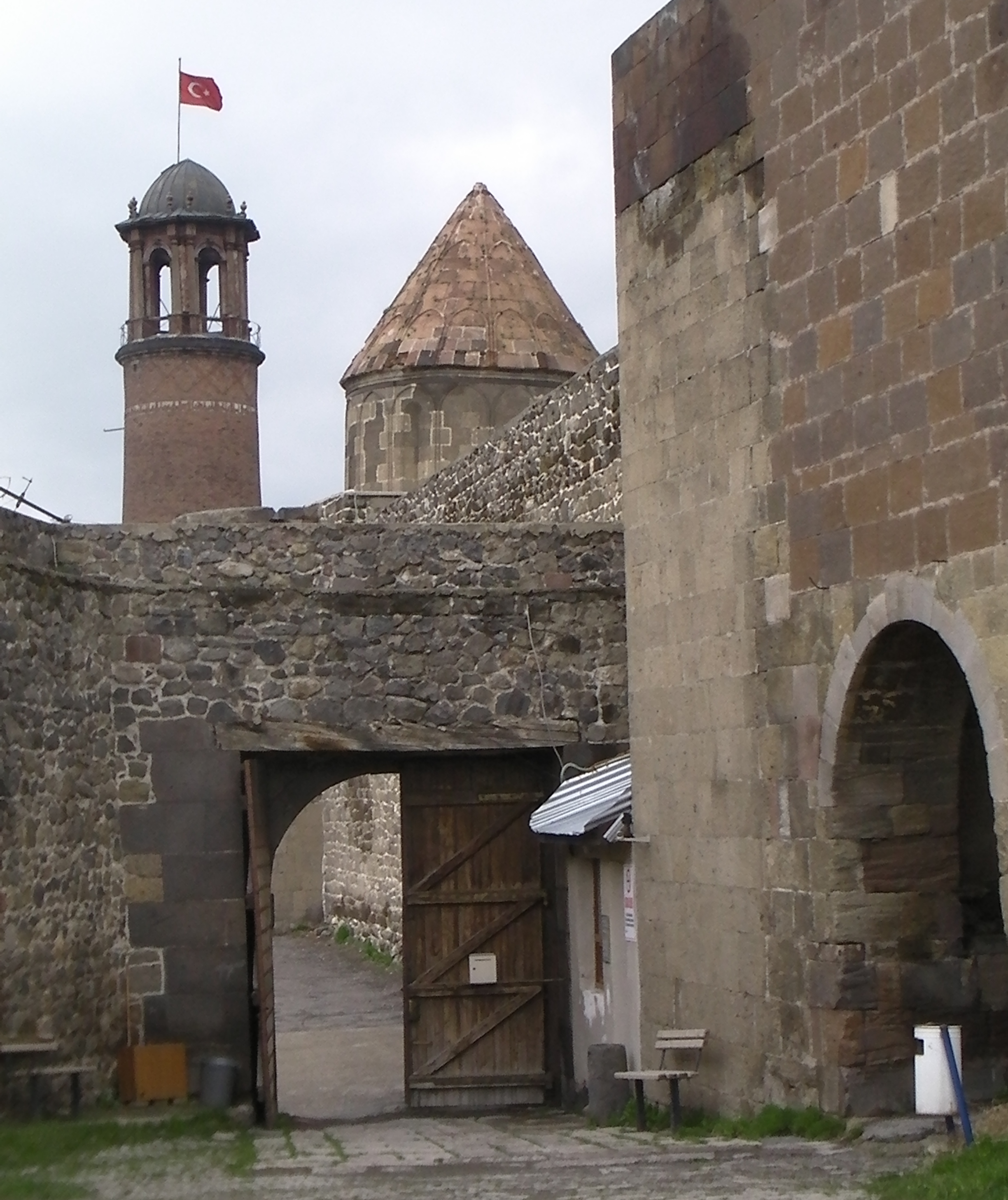
- Gate with clock tower in background
- Interactive map of the Erzurum Castle area

General information
- Location: Erzurum
- Coordinates: 39.90779°N 41.27721°E
- Years built: 5th and 12th century

The Erzurum Castle is a 5th century fortification located in Erzurum, Turkey. It is a monument of cultural heritage and is the oldest site in the city. The castle is located at the traditional center of the city and is near other monuments such as the Çifte Minareli Medrese.

== History ==
The Byzantines constructed a castle on the site in 422 during their conflicts with the Persians. The Saltukids then modified the castle in the 12th century, and a citadel mosque was also present around this time. In the Ottoman period, the castle was used by the sultan's janissaries. During the Russo-Turkish wars of the 19th century, an Ottoman army official described the castle as a fortification surrounded by shops and residences.

During the Battle of Erzurum, the Ottoman defenses extended heavily beyond the historic fortress itself. According to historian William Edward David Allen, as the Russians broke through the outlying forts and entered the city, fighting did not take place on the ancient fortifications of Erzurum.

== Architecture ==
The castle features a brick minaret from the 12th century and a clock from the 19th century. The walls, also dating to the 12th century modifications, compose the majority of the remaining structure. The citadel mosque is notable for lacking a central open courtyard. The site is also one of several castles in Turkey that have been mapped with 3D modeling to allow people to observe the site in virtual reality.

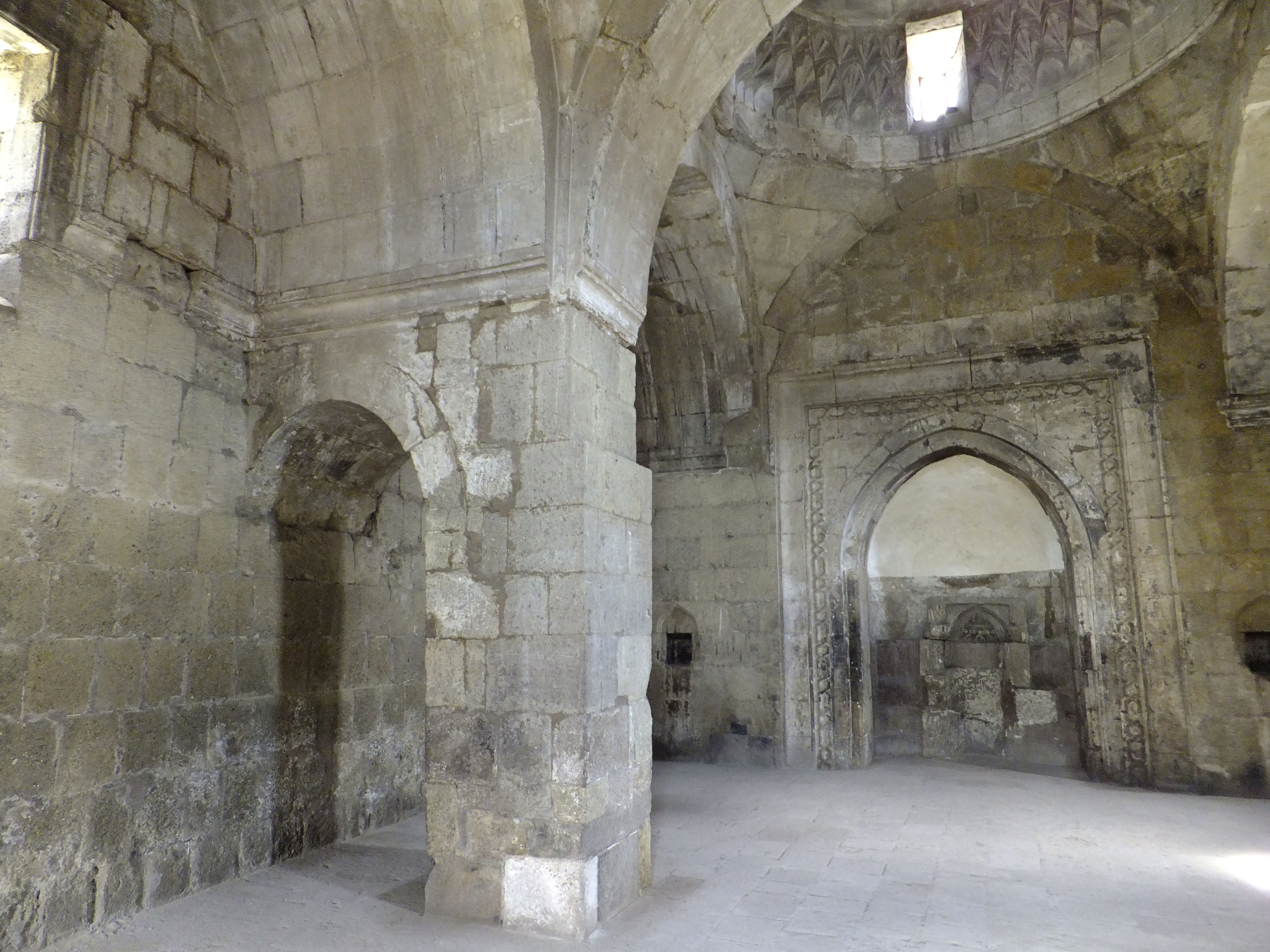
Interior of castle mosque

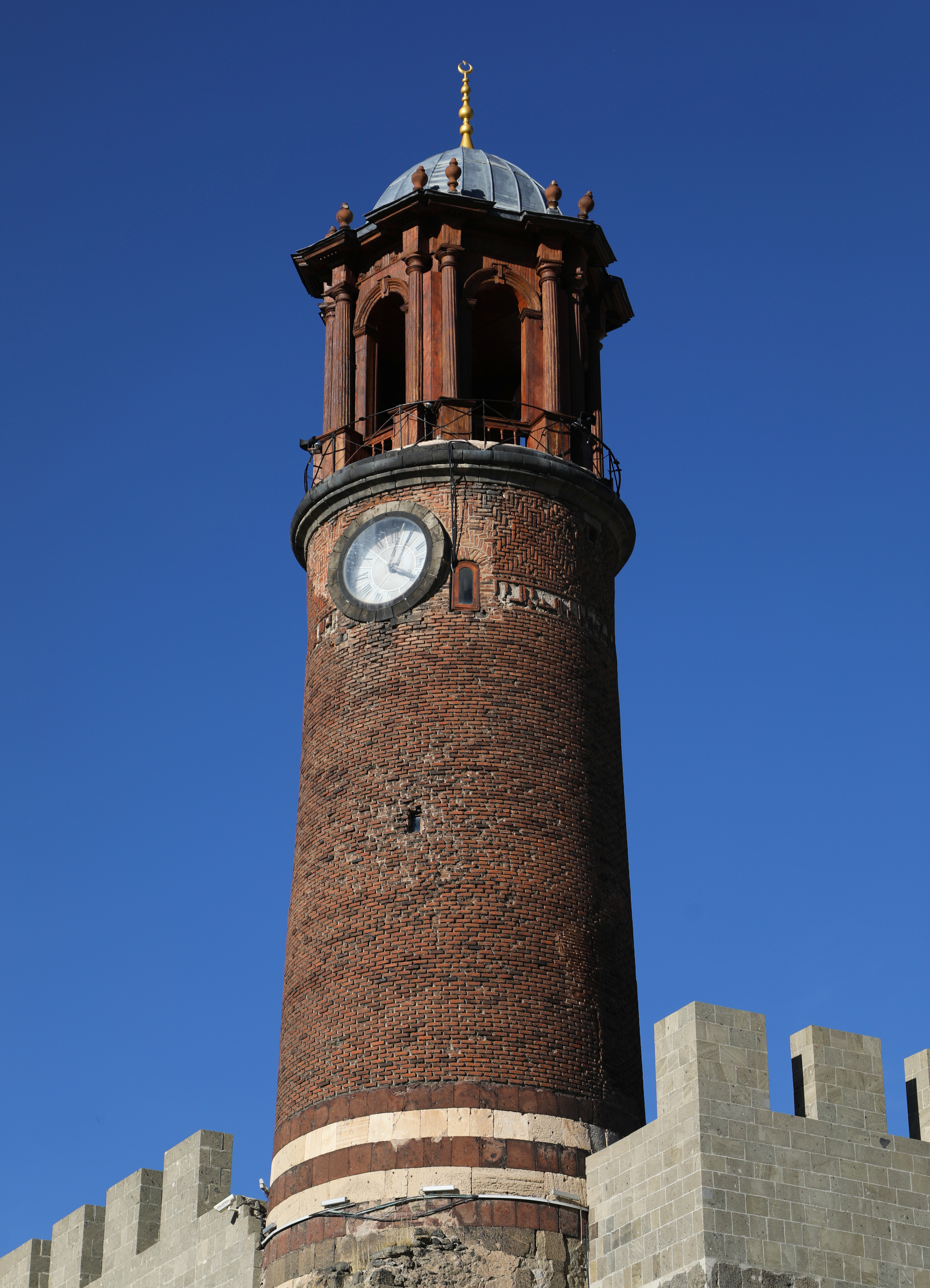
Tower and clock

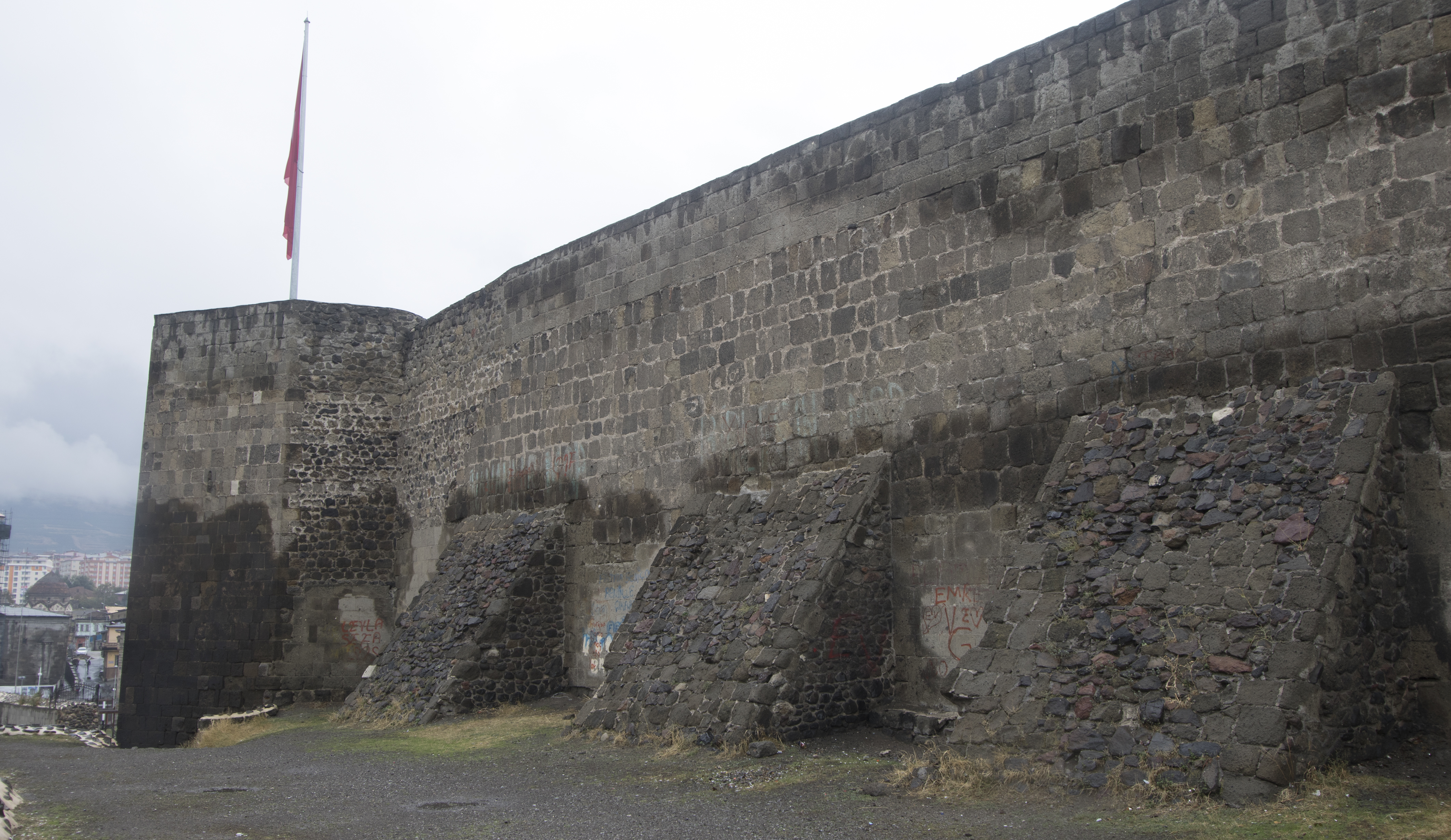
Exterior walls

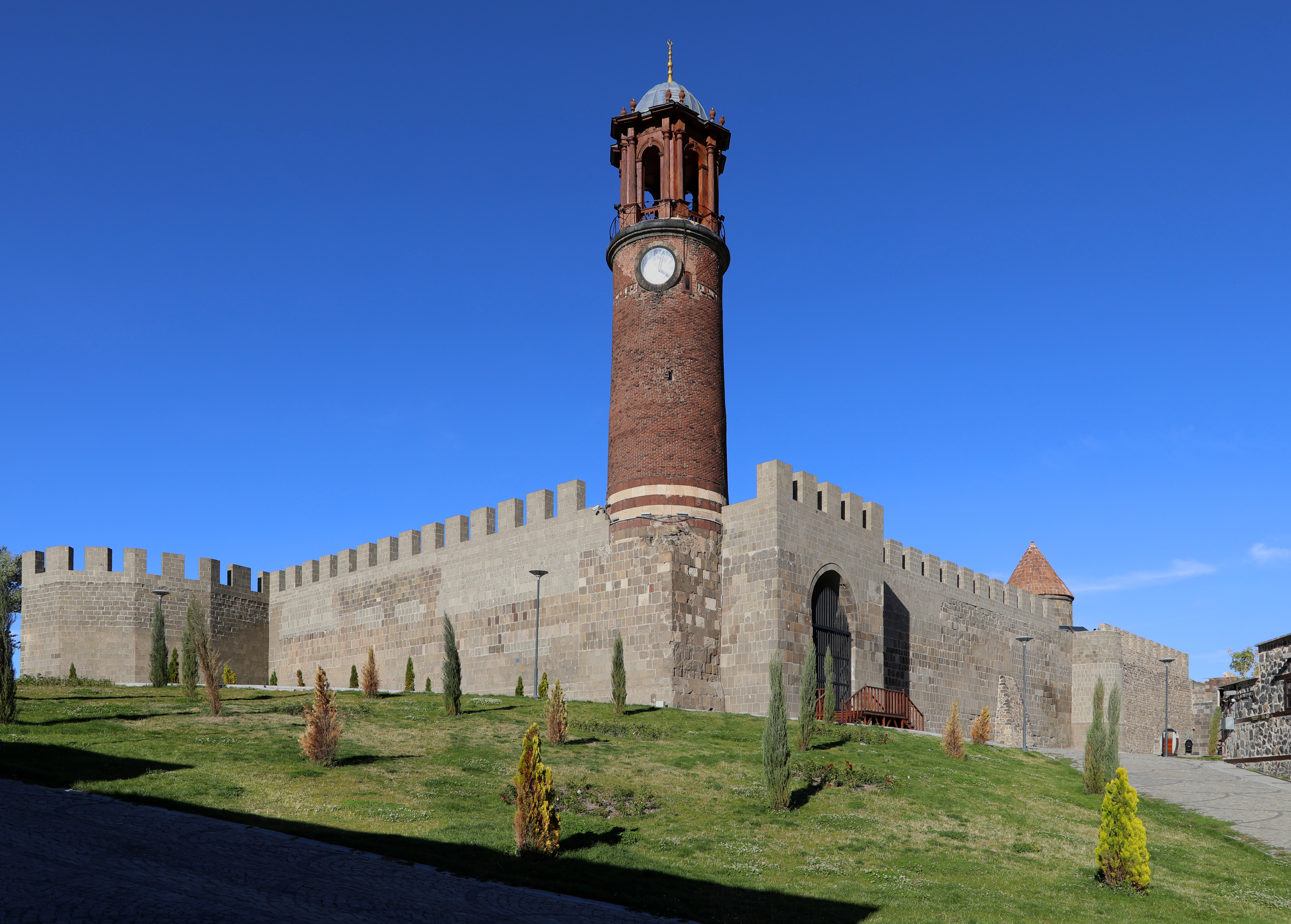
View of Erzurum Castle

== See also ==
- List of castles in Turkey
