= Paul Elia =

Assyrian comedian from Metro Detroit

- Born: February 23, 1988 (age 38); Southfield, Michigan, U.S.

Comedy career
- Years active: 2009–present
- Medium: Stand-up; television; film
- Genres: stand-up comedy; surreal humor; insult comedy; sarcasm; satire; podcasting
- Subjects: Assyrian culture; Iraqi culture; Southwestern Asia; Detroit; everyday life; relationships; family; failures and setbacks; religion
- Website: watchpaulelia.com

Paul Elia (born February 23, 1988) is an American comedian and actor from Detroit, MI. In 2024, his debut comedy special Detroit Player was released on YouTube.

== Career ==
Elia was born in San Diego, California on February 23, 1988, to Iraqi Assyrian immigrant parents. His family moved to Southfield in Metro Detroit in 1994. Growing up, his mother was a cashier and owner of a liquor store in Clinton Township, while his father worked as a butcher for various supermarkets. He was initially two classes shy of graduating from Wayne State University with a bachelor's in English and had been hoping to apply to law school before deciding to become a comedian. After his first professional role on Detroit 1-8-7, he moved to Los Angeles, California.

Elia arrived in Hollywood in 2011 and created his own projects with money he saved while working late nights at a nightclub. Although he didn't have any solid Hollywood representation, he still managed to audition for various TV shows and films. When asked by The Arab American News about his struggles, Elia said “You have to take big risks. The people who take big risks are the ones who make it...Of course you're going to be scared, but what you do with that defines you as a human being.”

Elia has been vocal about his Iraqi and especially his Assyrian heritage, and the issues pressing his community in wake of violence in indigenous Assyrian lands in Iraq. He has also been vocal about the divisions that the Assyrian community faces, namely regarding the naming dispute. Elia has also discussed how he began to feel ostracized from his community as a result of his stance on unity, even receiving a death threat before touring in Toronto. In a 2025 Substack article, Elia criticized the political origins of Chaldean identity and the impact that ongoing divisions had on his community, while expressing pride in his Assyrian ethnicity and his Chaldean Catholic religious background.

== Influences ==
Elia has previously cited his family (specifically his mother) as being one of the greatest influences in his life, due to her experiences in Iraq and her hard-working lifestyle in one of Michigan's many impoverish neighborhoods. In regard to his comedy, Elia has cited some of his closest partners, Matt Rife and Bassem Youssef, as people who have helped to strengthen his comedy career, including helping him to produce Detroit Player.

== Personal life ==
Elia is currently based in Los Angeles, California. He is married to an Oral and Maxillofacial Surgeon. He has three brothers, who take professions in law, neurosurgery, and mortgage banking.

== Filmography ==
=== Film ===
Year	Title	Role	Notes
2010	CornerStore	Hassan Akrawi	
2011	Holly's Holiday	Darryl	
2011	Exit 33	Dax	
2011	Bad to the Bone	Jesus Hernandez	
2012	Divorce Invitation	Sam	
2013	Only in L.A.	Hassan	
2014	Love in the Time of Monsters	Jim	
2014	The Brittany Murphy Story	Caller Director	
2016	Dirty	Detective Jackson	
2016	In the Same Garden	Anton	
2017	2016	Benton	
2017	The Landlord	Heckler	
2018	Stillwater	Willie	
2020	2 Minutes of Fame	Uber Man	Uncredited role
2022	Who Killed Cooper Dunn?	Willie	

=== Television ===
Year	Title	Role	Notes
2009	Skill Crane	Eugene	
2009	The Hill	Joey	
2010	Scourge	Northmen Guard 2	
2010	Defying Deletion: The Fight over Iraq's Nineveh Plains	Terrorist	
2011	Dick and Brain	Coffee Shop Owner	Episode 1
2011	Bluetooths for Better Living	Homeless Eddie	
2011	Detroit 1-8-7	FBI Man #2	Episode: "Blackout", Recurring cast member
2011	The Finalist	Harold Levy	
2012	The People Who Were Never There	The Man	
2013	Vegas	AD	Episode: "Two of a Kind"
2013	A Friend	Ralphy	
2013	Bad News	Mark	
2013	ABC Discovers: Los Angeles Talent Showcase		
2013	Nameless	Bullet #3	
2014	Mixology	Kevin	Episode: "Liv and Jim"
2014	Agents of S.H.I.E.L.D.	Diaz	Episode: "Ragtag"
2014	Mistresses	Delivery Man	Episode: "Friends with Benefits"
2014	The Yellow Attic	Yusef Thabit	
2014	Mentor	Paul	
2014–2016	Absolutely Jason Stuart	Himself	Recurring guest
2015	Xanadu	Joel	
2015	Serial Scoop Now	Himself	Episode: "6th Annual ISAs Red Carpet Show - Part 5"
2015	The Perils of Posting	Himself	
2016	Lady Dynamite	Brian	Episode: "I Love You"
2016	Open House on Beverly	Mr. Kashat	
2016	Knives	Ray	
2016	No Other Like You	Him	
2017	Add-TV	Himself	Episode: "Episode 1.1"
2017	Sremm Break	Trevor Norton	
2017	Major Crimes	Charles Gray	Episode: "Shockwave: Part 2"
2018	Broken Minds	Samuel	
2018	Dry City	Seth	
2018	Laff Mobb's Laff Tracks	Himself	Episode: "The Inappropriate Barber"
2018	Sh#t I Love with Jason Stuart	Himself	Episode: "Paul Elia"
2018–2020	Conan	Various roles	Recurring cast, seasons 8–10
2019	TMI Hollywood	Himself	Episode: "Paul Elia Hosts TMI Hollywood"
2020	Doubting Thomas	Jon	
2020	Ramy	Kalim	Episode: "Miakhalifa.mov"
2020	Tournament of Laughs	Himself	Episode: "And A Round of 32 We Go, Part 1"
2021	Cultural Blasphemy	Himself	Episode: "John Mayer is Overrated" & "The Titanic Was NOT Iconic"
2022	We Need to Talk about America	Himself	
2023	All AT Once		
2023	Paul Elia: Detroit Player	Himself	Comedy special
2025	Number 1 Happy Family USA	Uncle Ahmed	6 episodes

== Awards and nominations ==
Year	Award	Category	Work	Result
2011	Action on Film Award	Breakout Action Star – Male	Bad to the Bone	Nominated
2015	Indie Series Awards	Best Writing (Comedy)	Mentor	Nominated
