= Nurullah Beg =

19th-century emir of the Hakkari Emirate

- Emir of the Hakkari Emirate „dergah-i âli kapıcıbaşılığı“
- Reign: 1830-1847 (17 years)
- Died: October 1861; Istanbul
- Spouse: Halime Khanim
- Dynasty: Emirate of Hakkari
- Religion: Sunni Islam

Nurullah Beg was the last ruler of Hakkari Emirate in the 19th century, he was known for his involvement in attacks on the Assyrian and Yazidi populations. He was part of a triple alliance with Bedir Khan Beg and Han Mahmud in the 1840s, which carried out several assaults on Assyrian communities, including massacres and forced displacements that altered the demographic balance in parts of the Ottoman Empire.

== Reign ==
In 1837, Mar Shimun, the Assyrian Patriarch, sent 3,000 men, reportedly on Nurullah Beg's recommendation, to assist in the defense of ’Amadiya against Ottoman forces. However, the troops suddenly abandoned the defense, earning the displeasure of Nurullah Beg and several other Kurdish chiefs. At the same time, the increasing presence of foreign Christian missionaries in Hakkari drew international attention to the Assyrian communities. This heightened visibility made the Assyrians more prominent in the eyes of local Muslim rulers and contributed to rising tensions in the region.

In 1839, a war broke out in Hakkari between Nurullah Bey, brother of the former Kurdish Emir who governed from Bash Qal’a, and his nephew Suleyman, whose capital was Dzhulamerk. The Assyrian population was divided, with many, including Patriarch Mar Shimun XVII Abraham, supporting Suleyman as the rightful successor. The conflict escalated into a massacre in 1841 when Nurullah defeated Suleyman and attacked Assyrian villages and the Patriarchate in Qochanis, creating a lasting rift between Kurds and Assyrians.

In 1840, Dr. Asahel Grant was called to Başkale to treat Nurullah Beg, who was bedridden with a severe fever. Grant provided medicine, and Nurullah Beg soon recovered, rewarding him with a horse. This encounter secured the temporary friendship of an influential Kurdish emir and gave the American missionaries easier access to Hakkari.

In 1841, Nurullah Bey attempted to subjugate the Nestorian Patriarch. The conflict began when he destroyed the village of Qudshanis to enforce his authority, forcing the Patriarch to flee to the region controlled by the Dız Tribe.

In 1842, however, relations had deteriorated, and according to missionary reports, Nurullah Beg sought Ottoman assistance to bring the Assyrian tribes into submission. In the same year he led an assault against the Assyrian population, during which about 5,000 Assyrians were massacred.

In 1843 and again in 1846, he took part in the massacres of Assyrians in Hakkari alongside Bedir Khan Beg of Bohtan. Together they launched large-scale attacks on Assyrian mountain communities, destroying villages, killing thousands of inhabitants, and taking many into captivity. The massacres resulted in the killing of 10,000-15,000 Assyrians.

In 1847, Nurullah Beg was deposed due to his involvement in the uprising led by Bedir Khan, the Emir of Bohtan.

In 1850, he was sent into exile in Crete with Bedir Khan Beg after his deposition in 1847.

== Death ==
Nurullah Bey died on 21 October 1861 in Istanbul. After his death, his salary of 8,000 kuruş was divided among his family. He had two sons, Ibrahim Bey, who studied at the Mekteb-i Ceriye, and Abdullah Bey. His widows, Fatma and Hurşid Hanım, as well as his sister Emine Hanım and her husband, were settled in Vidin on the Balkans. His uncle Mehmed Selim Efendi and other relatives were placed in Kandiye (Crete).

== Assassination of Friedrich Eduard Schulz ==
In 1829, Friedrich Eduard Schulz, a German (sometimes mistakenly referred to as French) archaeologist and orientalist, was killed during a research expedition in the Hakkâri region, near Başkale. Schulz is regarded as the first Western traveler of the 19th century to visit Hakkâri. Prior to his death, he had studied the remains of the ancient Urartian kingdom and reported on cuneiform inscriptions at the Castle of Van and other sites. According to several accounts, Schulz was murdered on the orders of the Kurdish emir Nurullah Bey, who was reportedly disturbed by the scholar's investigations.
