= 1843 and 1846 massacres in Hakkari =

Massacres of Assyrians in Hakkari in the years 1843 and 1846

Coordinates: 37.5°N 43.7°E

A series of massacres in Hakkari in the years 1843 and 1846 of Assyrian Christians were carried out by the Kurdish emirs of Bohtan and Hakkari, Bedir Khan Beg and Nurullah Beg along with allied Assyrian tribes who were against the rule of Shimun XVII Abraham. According to Dr. Smith, the population lost as a result of these events was between 10,000 and 15,000, of which around 10,000 were killed during the first campaign. Another American missionary, Justin Perkins, estimated that approximately 7,000 Assyrians were killed in Tehoma alone in 1846.

== Background ==
=== Ottoman affairs ===
By the 19th century, the weakened Ottoman Empire had started losing control over Upper Mesopotamia. The empire seemed on the brink of collapse when Muhammad Ali revolted in Egypt and took control of Syria. It was then that Kurdish Emirs found an opportunity to assert their independence.

Among them was Ibrahim Pasha, a Kurdish Emir whose dominion included a region extending from Diyarbakır to Aleppo, and who fought alongside Muhammad Ali against the Ottomans and their allies from the Shammar tribe in Jazira. Despite the failure of Muhammad Pasha in his Syrian campaign, the events showed the vulnerability of the Ottomans and encouraged Kurdish aghas to try and increase their control in the region.

British fears of another French attempt similar to Napoleon's Egyptian campaign contributed to an increase of British influence. As these events unfolded, the British appointed Hormuzd Rassam, an ethnic Assyrian archaeologist from Mosul, and brother-in-law of Britain's ambassador in the city, as a delegate to expand British influence to the areas of the independent Assyrian tribes. British and American Protestant missionaries, such as Justin Perkins and Asahel Grant, started visiting the area in the same period. They generally showed great sympathy to the Assyrian Christians.

The Kurds, however, were wary of them, and the Assyrians' hospitality towards the foreigners only increased their suspicion. The "hostile intention of the Kurds towards the Assyrians" was well known to British officials." On 27 January 1842, Canning wrote to the foreign secretary, Lord Aberdeen, informing him that the "Nestorians" have been subdued by a "Kurdish Bey" acting in concert with the Ottomans.

=== Kurdish internal conflicts ===
War broke out in Hakkari in 1839 between Nurullah, brother of the former Emir, who governed from Bash Qal'a, and Suleyman his nephew whose capital was in Gullamerk. The Assyrians were also split in their allegiances, according to their distribution. Most of them, including the Patriarch of the Church of the East Shimun XVII Abraham, supported Suleyman as the rightful successor to his father.

The conflict turned into a massacre when Nurullah defeated his opponent and retaliated by attacking Assyrian villages and the Patriarchate of Qudshanis in 1841. This led to a permanent rift in relations between the Kurds and Assyrians in general. However, not all Assyrians allied themselves with the Patriarch. Some took advantage of his weakness to join Nurullah.

The region descended into another war after a disagreement between Vali of Mosul, Mohammed Pasha, and the Kurdish Agha Ismael Pasha of Amedi. The latter resorted to Nurullah of Hakkari and Badr Khan, the ambitious emir of Buhtan. The three formed an alliance and called Assyrians to join them. The Patriarch however refused to do so after receiving promises from Mosul to protect them in case of the Kurds decided to retaliate again. War between the Kurds and Ottomans broke out in summer 1842. The next months were particularly calm in Hakkari with the Kurds busy with the war in Mosul, and missionary Asahel Grant commenced building a large religious school in the Christian Assyrian town of Ashitha and provided it with Syriac books and scriptures from Mosul in September, 1842. The Kurdish campaign ended the same month with failure, and the Assyrians were blamed for refusing to intervene in the war. Rumours spread that Grant built a castle to be used against the Kurds, and Nurullah protested to the vali of Erzurum. In addition, Ibrahim Pasha of Mosul was also alarmed by the rumours and the increased missionary activities in the region. He described in a letter to the Porte how Grant and the Christians built a huge building containing at least 200 rooms.

== 1843 massacre ==
In early 1843, Nurullah sent for a meeting with the patriarch and the latter apologized using the weather, his religious duties, and the presence of a guest, the British missionary George Badger, as a pretence. It seemed that the patriarch made his decision after being convinced by Badger to distrust the Kurds and to request assistance from the English or the Porte if the Kurds were to attack. Once Badger left, Nurullah renewed his alliance with the Badr Khan and Ismail Pasha, and requested permission from the Vali of Mosul to subjugate the Christians.

In July 1843, the Kurdish alliance, along with Assyrians that were against the rule of Shimun XVII Abraham led by Badr Khan, attacked the Assyrians in Hakkari, destroyed their villages and killed many of them. Many of those who participated in the massacres had taken advantage of the weak connections between the Assyrian tribes, and many were forced to leave their homes due to the massacre. Hormuzd Rassam tried using his influence with the Vali of Baghdad Najib Pasha to pressure Badr Khan for the release of prisoners, which included close relatives of the Patriarch of the Church of the East who had in the meantime taken refuge in Mosul. His attempts only led to the release of about 150, one of whom was the sister of the patriarch, while the rest were distributed as war booty between Agha's and Mullahs.

On August 3, Kurdish forces had succeeded in "subduing the tribes and it was reported that 'still the slaughter is not yet ended, and several who have attempted to flee have been murdered...'". Then the invaders had turned "against the district of Tiyari, where they had succeeded in occupying the villages and indulged in the cruelest acts against its people". Even "those who had not opposed the Kurdish invasion had been treated in the same way as the fighters." The patriarch's mother's body was chopped into four pieces. Many women and young children "were taken captive to be sold as slaves." On 21 August 1843, the British consul Abbott reported on "the role of the Kurds" in the massacres of Assyrian tribes who attacked the Kurds first. The "prime agitator for the attack from the frontier was the 'Shaik'" of the Kurds of Bradost". The Kurdish tribes were "marching in large numbers directly to the Assyrian provinces." According to the wali of Mosul, the number of Kurdish soldiers was estimated at 100,000, although the Assyrians themselves are said to have estimated it at 70,000. The Kurdish soldiers were united from all across the Middle East.

It was reported that the "killing and destruction continued apace. Corpses lay everywhere. The surviving men and women were forced to carry unbearable loads of booty for very long distances, while being lashed all along the way until they fell from torture and exhaustion". Ross wrote: "They were tortured in an awful manner to force them to expose what they call hidden treasures, while others were killing them just for entertainment and as sport and games'. The tribes "were all but encircled and left with no safe route to escape" the slaughter. Those that tried to flee had to take a route that passed through the hostile Kurds of Berwar. One group after another was caught and slaughtered "while trying to escape". It is estimated by contemporary sources that the victims of the assault of 1843 numbered ten thousand, but according to Adoona, that figure "cannot represent the total victims of the attack".

=== Death of Malik Ismail ===
A crucial event in the conflict was when Bedir Khan Beg's forces captured Malik Ismael. As Ismael lay severely wounded, he defiantly declared, "This arm has taken the lives of nearly twenty Kurds; and, had God spared me, as many more would have fallen by it!" Soon after, Bedr Khan Beg ordered his men to execute Ismael by beheading him and throwing his body into the river. Ismael's wife and many Assyrians were taken prisoner. However, a few managed to escape by crossing the Upper Zab river and to avoid being chased, they destroyed the Lezan bridge behind them on the orders of Mar Shimun.

== 1846 massacre ==
Another massacre was inflicted by Bedir Khan in 1846, even against those Assyrians who joined him in his first campaign of massacres in 1843. Bedir Khan killed 7,000 Assyrians just in Botan. This massacre received international attention through western press; it also woke European politicians and public opinion to the plight of Christians. This led the European countries to pressure the Porte to intervene and stop the massacres.

== Aftermath ==
In 1844 George Percy Badger working with Mar Shimun put the losses at 4,000 Assyrians dead. According to Dr. Smith, the death toll from these events ranged between 10,000 and 15,000, with roughly 10,000 killed during the initial campaign. Another American missionary, Justin Perkins, estimated that about 7,000 Nestorians were slain in Tkhuma alone in 1846. The Kurdish massacres were a precursor to the later incursions which ended both the autonomous status which the Assyrian tribes enjoyed, and that which the Kurds in the mountainous areas had as well. The government saw the communal conflict as an opportunity to overthrow the last Kurdish emirates in 1847, establishing direct control of the entire region. A battalion was sent to the region in 1847, and clashed with the Kurds in several battles that ended with the arrest of both Badr Khan and Nurullah, and their exile in the same year. Later on, the Hakkari province was established and governed from Başkale.

Due to the massacres of 1843-1846 committed by the troops of the Kurdish leader Bedr Khan Beg against the independent Assyrian tribes, "the long-Iasting existence of the Assyrian people as an independent body" was ended.

== See also ==
- 1860 Lebanon conflict
- Hamidian massacres
- Assyrian genocide
- List of conflicts in the Near East
