= Erzurum offensive =

1916 Russian offensive against the Ottoman Empire during WW1

- Part of the Caucasus campaign of the First World War
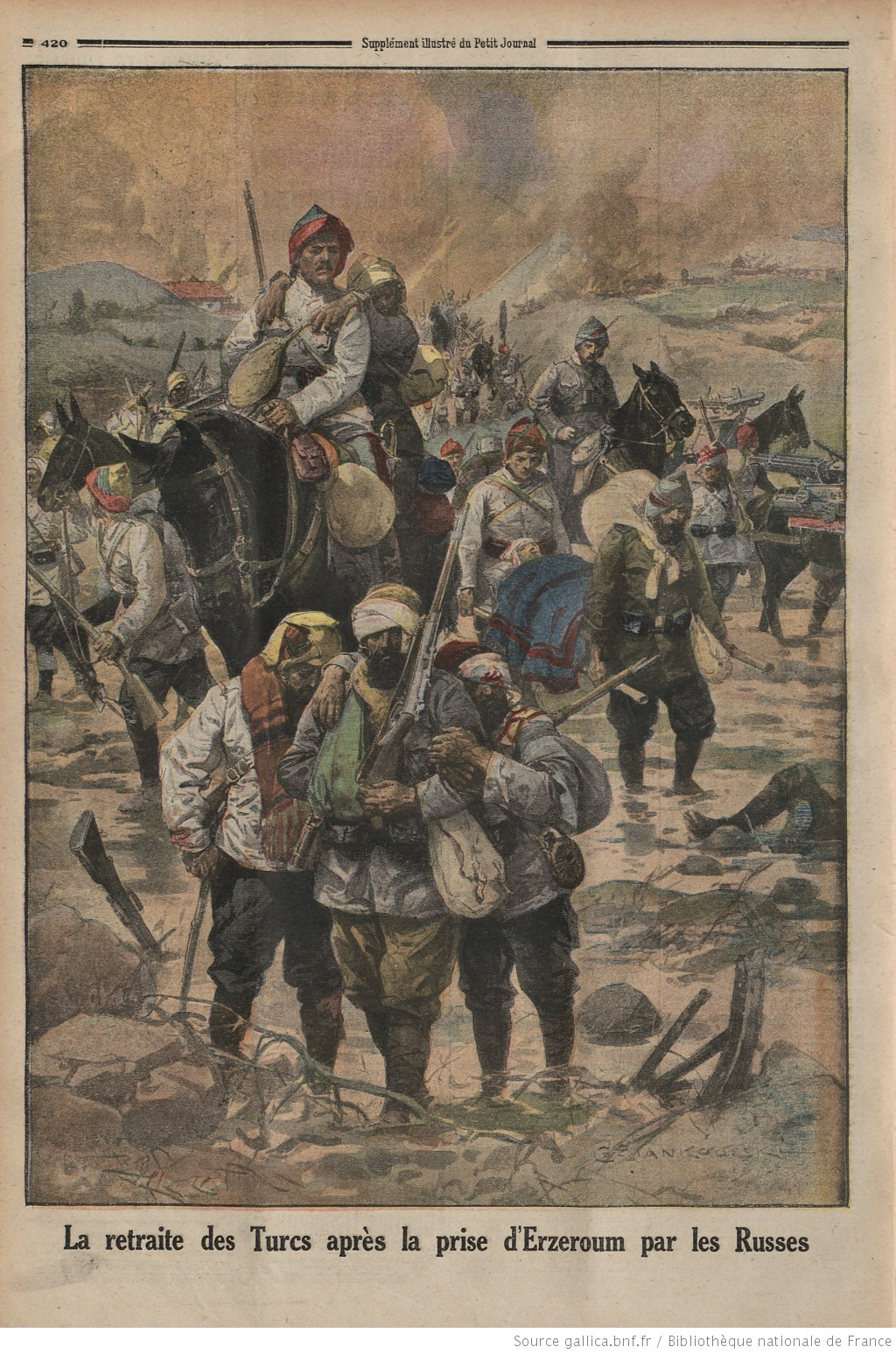
- Le Petit Journal Feb. 27, 1916; Retreat of the Turks after the taking of Erzurum by the Russians
Date	10 January 1916 – 16 February 1916
Location	Erzurum, Ottoman Empire
Result	Russian victory Full results: Destruction of the Third Turkish Army; Russians gain support among Muslims in the Caucasus
Territorial changes	Russians successfully break into Anatolia

Belligerents
Russian Empire	Ottoman Empire

Commanders and leaders
Nikolai Yudenich	Abdul Kerim Pasha

Units involved
Russian Caucasus Army	Third Army

Strength
120,000; 338 guns	80,000+ 150 guns Erzurum Castle: 265 guns

Casualties and losses
17,135: 2,339 killed; 14,796 wounded	66,000: 13,000–20,000 POWs, including 300 officers; 315–450 cannons

The Erzurum offensive (Russian: Эрзурумское сражение, romanized: Erzurumskoe srazhenie; Turkish: Erzurum Taarruzu) or Battle of Erzurum (Turkish: Erzurum Muharebesi) was a major winter offensive by the Imperial Russian Army on the Caucasus Campaign, during the First World War that led to the capture of the strategic city of Erzurum. The Turkish forces, in winter quarters, suffered a series of unexpected reverses, which led to a Russian victory.

== Background ==
After the defeat at the Battle of Sarikamish, the Ottomans tried to reorganise. The Armenian genocide made supplying their forces a problem. Trade by Armenians, which had supplied the Ottoman Army, was disrupted. The dismissal of Armenian soldiers into labour battalions and their massacres further worsened the problem. However, throughout 1915, the northern sectors of the front remained quiet.

At the same time, the end of the Gallipoli Campaign would free up considerable Turkish soldiers, which made Nikolai Yudenich, the commander of the Russian Caucasus Army, prepare to launch an offensive. He hoped to take the main fortress of Erzurum in the area, followed by Trabzon. That would be was a difficult campaign since Erzurum was protected by a number of forts in the mountains.

Eight of the available Ottoman divisions were designated for the Caucasus Front. Yudenich believed that he could launch an offensive before the Ottoman divisions could be redeployed and readied for battle.

== Forces ==
=== Russian ===
The Russians had 130,000 infantry and 35,000 cavalry. They also had 160,000 troops in reserve, 150 supply trucks and 20 planes of the Siberian Air Squadron. According to other sources, the attacking group (the Russian Caucasian army) included about 120 thousand people and 338 guns.

=== Ottoman ===
The Ottoman forces had around 80,000 troops in the region.

== Operations ==
The Ottoman High Command did not expect any Russian operations during winter. Mahmut Kamil was in Istanbul, and his chief of staff, Colonel Felix Guse, was in Germany. General Yudenich launched a major winter offensive.

=== Defense lines ===
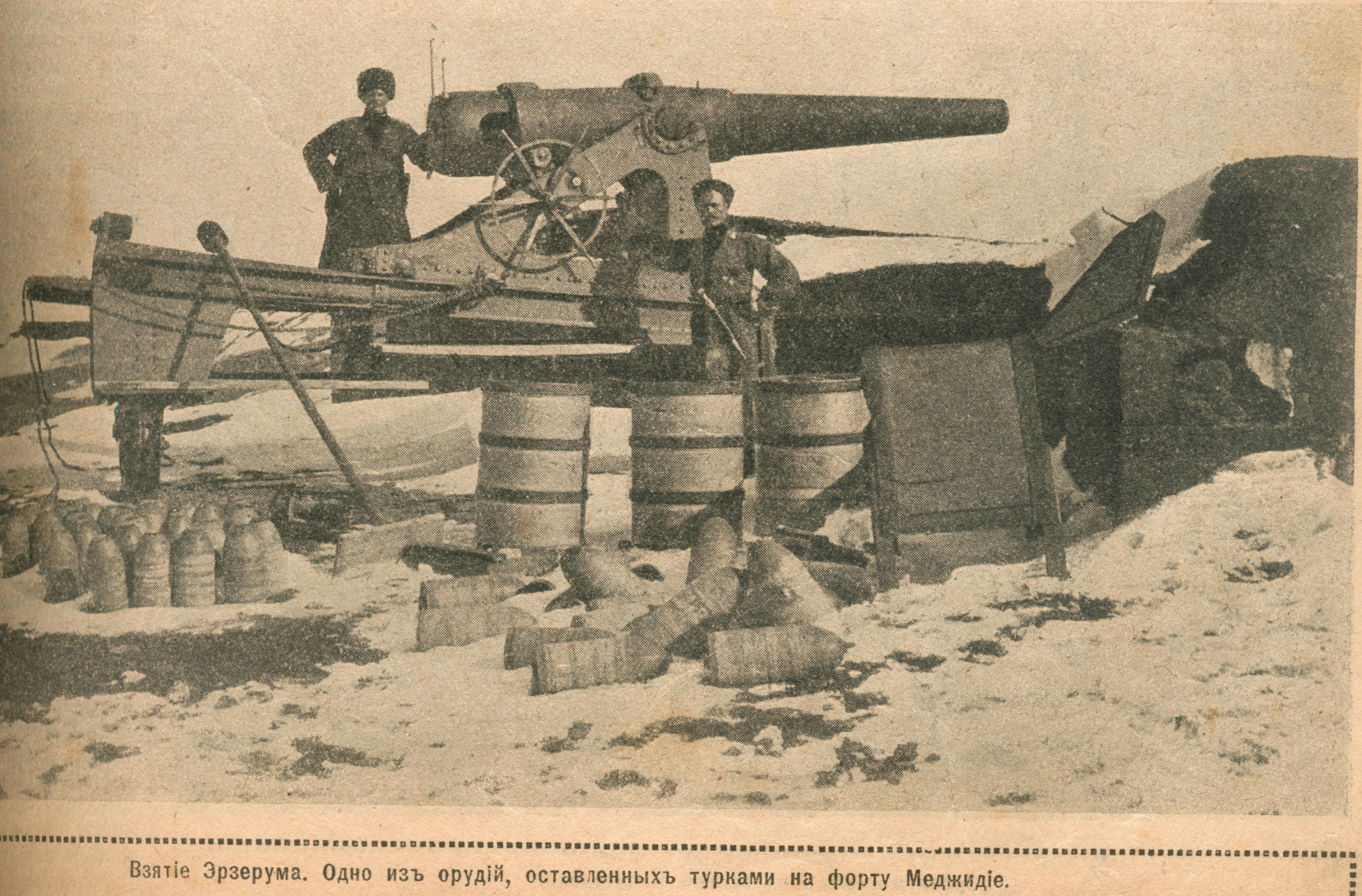
Russian soldiers in front of captured Ottoman 15 cm RK L/26 gun.

The Russians concentrated a little more troops on the strike directions, aerial reconnaissance was conducted and accurate data on the positions of the Turkish troops were collected.

The Erzurum fortress was considered impregnable, it had excellent shapes, and the road to the city passed through incredible slopes.

=== Road to Erzurum ===
On December 29, the Russians went on the offensive in several positions at the same time, the shooters moved slowly and completely in the snow on the mountain tops, and the Turks defended very fiercely. On December 31, there was a Christmas assault on the Azapkei positions, as a result of which the Turks fled. The assault cost the Russians dearly, the 153rd Baku regiment lost up to 2,000, which is equivalent to its regular strength.

Russian penetrated into the Passinsky valley after the capture of the Azapkei positions and took Keprikey from a raid, it was a heavy defeat for the third army, but the operation had to continue and the Russians reached the outskirts of Erzurum.

On January 29, Mahmut Kamil Paşa returned from Istanbul. He could feel that the Russians would not only attack Erzurum but also renew the offensive southern flank around Lake Van. Hınıs, to the south, was taken on February 7 to prevent reinforcements from Muş from coming in. Mahmut Kamil tried to strengthen the defensive lines. That drew most of the Ottoman reserves and diverted their attention away from the decisive attack farther north.

=== Hasankale ===
Fought on January 18–19, 1916, during the Caucasus Campaign, the Battle of Hasankale resulted in a Russian victory, with the Siberian Cossack Brigade annihilating an Ottoman rear-guard of four battalion. The Russian victory, which saw 1,000 Ottoman troops killed and 1,500 taken prisoner, allowed the Cossacks to pursue fleeing forces toward the Erzurum fortress system.

=== Deve-boyun ===
On February 11 and 12th, the Deveboynu Ridge, an important artillery platform, was the scene of heavy fighting. North of the Deveboynu Ridge, the Russian columns approached over the Kargapazar Ridge, which the Ottomans had considered impassable. The X Corps guarded that sector of the line, and its commander had positioned his divisions so that they could not support one another. Mahmut Kamil had five divisions in the Deve-Boyun ridge area but was slow to react to events north of that position.

=== Fort Tafet ===
During the storming of Erzurum, Russian forces targeted the Gürcü-boğaz Pass to bypass the heavily fortified Deve-boyun ridge. The pass was protected by Forts Kara-göbek and Tafet. On February 11, 1916, the Russian 39th Division pinned down Ottoman reserves while Turkistan rifle regiments isolated the northern forts. Russian forces captured an abandoned Fort Kara-göbek on February 12. Then, on February 14, Russian troops launched a three-sided assault on Fort Tafet. The fort fell that same day, resulting in the capture of 1,500 Ottoman prisoners and 20 guns. This breakthrough allowed the 4th Caucasian Rifle Division to reach the Kara-su plain, turning the Ottoman northern flank. Consequently, the Ottoman Third Army abandoned the perimeter, and Russian forces entered Erzurum on February 16.

=== The proximity of the disruption of the assault ===
After a major victory, Yudenich did not plan to stop the offensive, but Grand Duke Nicholas sharply opposed this, considering the assault doomed and irrational. To force Yudenich to stop, he sent Maslovsky to him, but he supported the decision of the assault, despite the highest morale of the troops.

Looking at this, the Grand Duke and Yudenich decided to discuss it personally, and Yudenich won the dispute, preparations for the assault began.

=== City of Erzurum ===
The fortress was under Russian threat, both from north and east. With the victories, the Russian Army had cleared the approaches to Erzurum. The Russians were now planning to take Erzurum, a heavily-fortified stronghold. Erzurum was considered as the second best-defended town in the Ottoman Empire. The fortress was defended by 235 pieces of artillery. Its fortifications covered the city on a 180° arc in two rings. There were eleven forts and batteries covering the central area. The flanks were guarded by a group of two forts on each flank. The Ottoman Third Army lacked the soldiers to adequately man the perimeter.

On January 28, the headquarters of the Army of the Caucasus was assembled, most of the officers were in favor of postponing the assault, and Yuderich agreed with them, saying to storm 5 minutes later than planned.

On January 29, the assault on the fortress began, the Turks defended themselves and preferred to die, but did not retreat and launched counterattacks.

The breakthrough through the Kargabazir plateau was decisive, because of its loss the entire Turkish front collapsed, five days later the assault ended with the capture of the fortress.

In total, 12,988 prisoners, 12 banners and 323 guns were taken in the fortress. The battle is also considered one of the best operations of the First World War and the heaviest defeat of the Turks.

Meanwhile, remnants of the X and XI Corps established another defensive line, 8 km east of Erzurum.

== Casualties ==
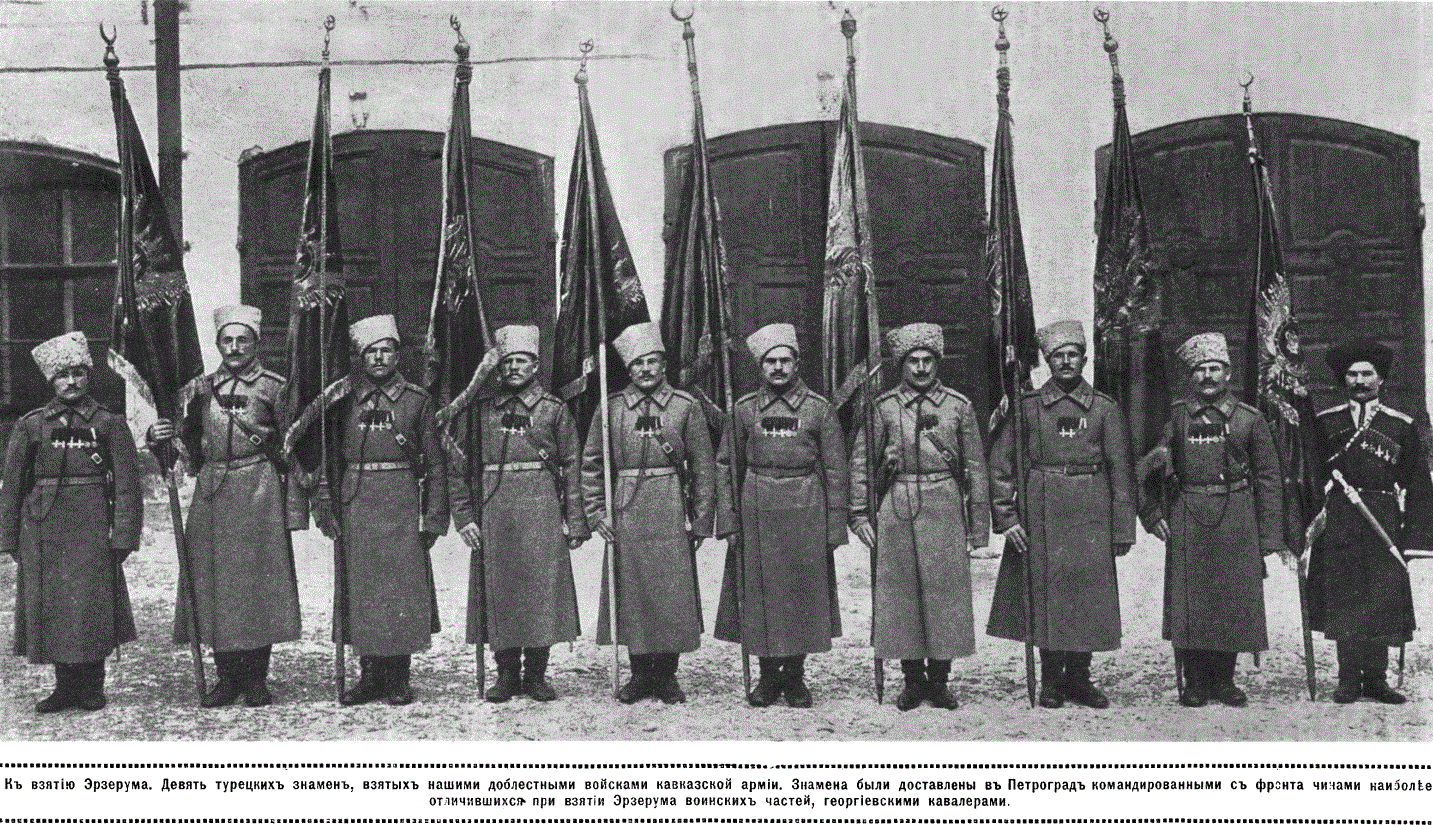
Russian troops holding captured standards at Erzurum

The Ottoman troops suffered heavy losses, the 3rd army was drained of blood so much that it actually turned into a corps, by the end of 1916, the forces of the 3rd army numbered 36,000 people. The total losses of the Ottomans during the campaign is 66,000 killed, wounded and captured

== Aftermath ==
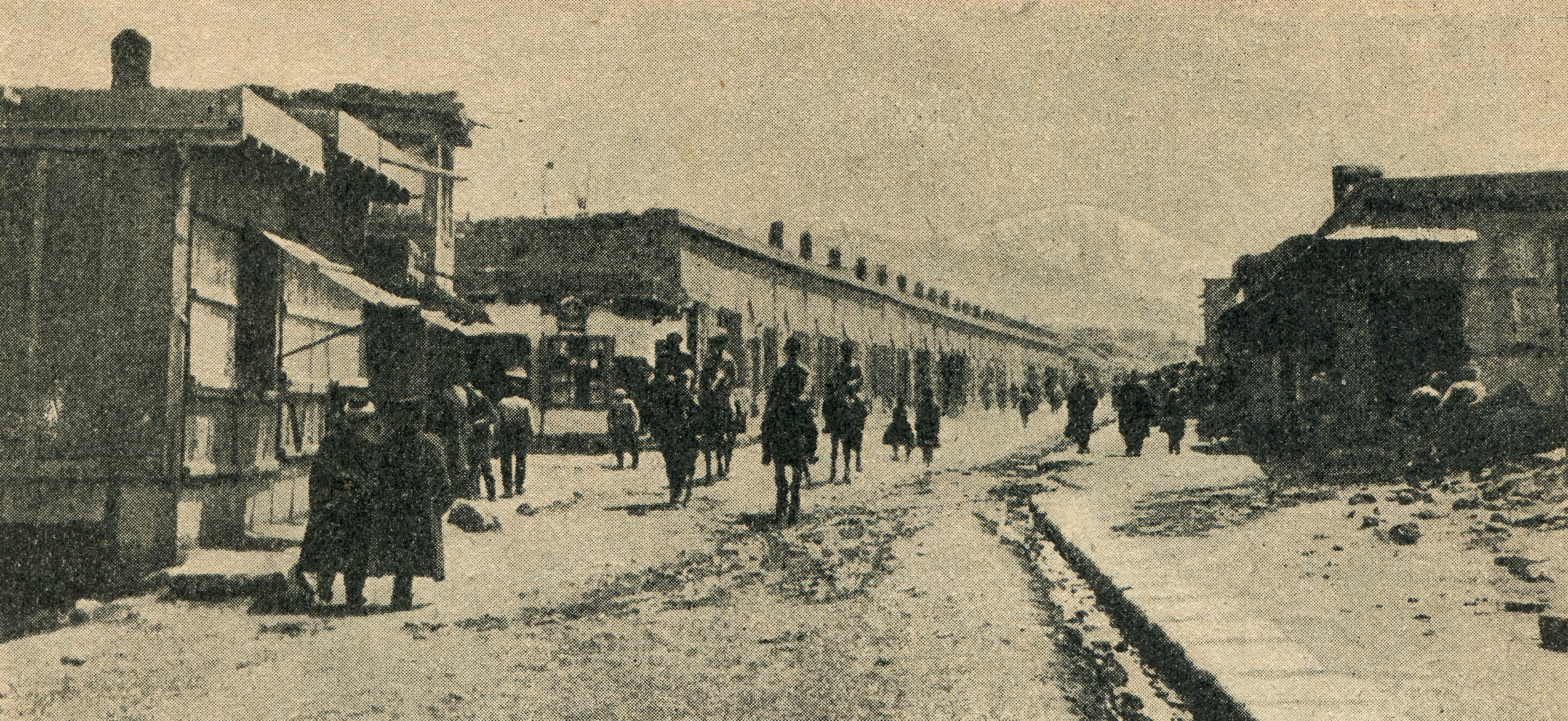
Russian soldier at Erzurum

The battle ended with the complete defeat of the 3rd Turkish army, after the operation it ceased to exist as a single unit. This operation showed the superiority of the Russians in the Caucasus, and their preparation for the difficult conditions there, as the battle took place in a mountainous area at a minimum temperature. The capture of Erzurum opened the way for the Russian Army to advance deep into Anatolia.

== In literature ==
The Battle of Erzurum forms the climax of John Buchan's novel Greenmantle.

== Sources ==
- Борисюк, Андрей (2023). История России, которую приказали забыть. Николай II и его время; [5-е издание]. St. Petersburg: Питер. ISBN 978-5-4484-3841-7.
- Allen, W.E.D. and Paul Muratoff, Caucasian Battlefields, A History of Wars on the Turco-Caucasian Border, 1828–1921, 351–363. ISBN 0-8983-9296-9
- Borisyuk, Andrey (2024). Забытая война. Россия в 1914-1918 [The forgotten war. Russia in 1914-1918] (in Russian). Moscow: Вече. ISBN 978-5-4484-5078-5.
- Kernosovsky, Anton (1938). История русской армии: Борьба на Кавказе [History of the Russian army: Struggle in Caucasus] (PDF) (in Russian).
- Miltatuli, Pyotr (2017). Россия в эпоху царствование Николая 2 [Russia in the reign of Nicholas 2] (in Russian). Volume 2. Moscow: Русский издательский центр имени святого Василия Великого.
- Oldenburg, Sergey (2022). Царствование императора Николая 2 [The Reign of Emperor Nicholas 2] (in Russian). Moscow: центрополиграф. ISBN 978-5-2270-9905-1.
- Oleynikov, Alexei (2016). Россия-щит Антанты [Russia-Shield of Entente]. Foreword by Nikolai Starikov. St.Petersburg: Piter. ISBN 978-5-4960-1795-4.
- Oleynikov, Alexei (2024). Великое отступление и стабилизация восточного фронта [The Great Retreat and stabilization of the Eastern Front]. Moscow: Вече. ISBN 978-5-4484-4482-1.
- Price, Morgan (1918). War and Revolution in Asiatic Russia. London: Macmillan.
- Walton, Robert (1984). The Fall of Erzerum. Marshall Cavendish Illustrated Encyclopedia of World War I. Vol. iv. New York: Marshall Cavendish. pp. 1262–1264. ISBN 0-8630-7181-3.
