= Vostan =

Vostan Ոստան
- Location within Armenia Location within Ararat
- Coordinates: 39°57′32″N 44°33′33″E
- Country: Armenia
- Province: Ararat
- Municipality: Artashat

Population (2011)
  - Total: 2,739

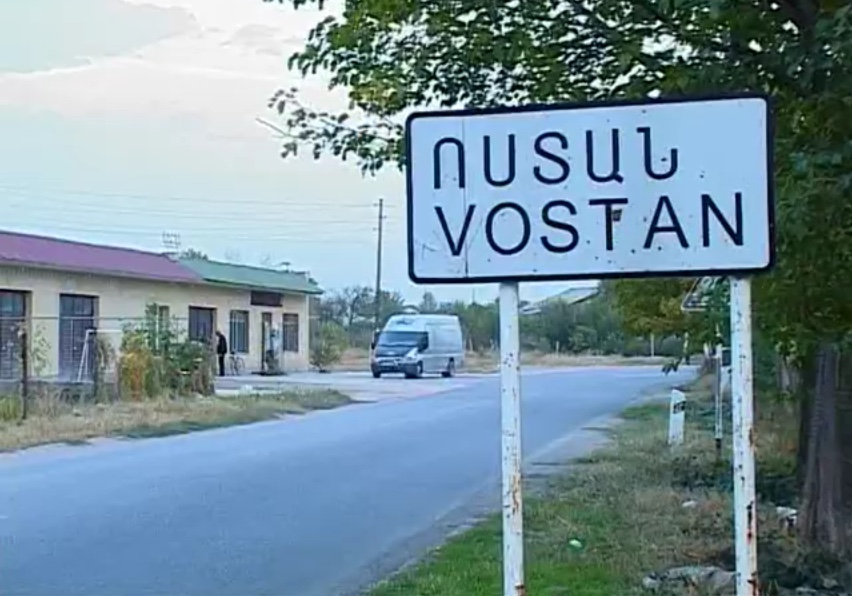

Vostan (Armenian: Ոստան) is a village in the Artashat Municipality of the Ararat Province of Armenia.

== History ==
Formerly a village, nowadays a settlement in Artashat Community, was founded in 1831. Before bearing names Bajazlou, Begjazlou, Bekjazlou was considered, as the name does hint, seat/place of beks/amirs, and was considered as part of Yerevan governorate. The current name was given since 1945.

The settlement is located in Ararat Valley 835 meters above sea level.

== Climate ==
Climate is semi-arid/arid, continental. Winters usually start in mid-December, January average temperature is between -3-ից -5°C: Summertime is longlasting, from May to October having 24-26°C as average monthly temperatures, and 43°C the hottest. Annual rainfall amounts are 250-300mm. The fields are provided with banal watering systems.

== Population ==
Based on 2011 census data results in Armenia, the permanent population is 2739, presence at that time consisted of 2621 people. The majority of the population are the descendants of those resettled/migrated Armenian people of the years 1828-1829 from Khoy and Salmast, and other Regions. The population change is presented in the below table, by years:

| Year | 1831 | 1897 | 1926 | 1939 | 1959 | 1970 | 1979 | 1979 | 1989 | 2001 | 2011 |
| Population | 352 | 1270 | 1204 | 1494 | 2358 | 2830 | 3042 | 3087 | 3125 | 3125 | 2739 |

== Notable villagers ==
- Ara Babloyan - former President of the National Assembly of Armenia, pediatrician.
- Sedrak Sedrakyan - Deputy chair of ANAC university, professor, scientist.
- Kajazun Gyurjyan - stage actor

== Economy ==
The largest portion of agricultural sector lies on gardening and other cultivations. The settlement has about 796 agricultural units, a public school, a kindergarten. Cultivating soil-lands are approximately 447 acres. Apricots, peaches, plums, berries, tomatoes, cucumber, wheat, cattle crops, and the most importantly wine grapes, etc. are the main agri-product. There are a few agri-units breeding farm animals, such as cows, a few sheep and farm birds. Key issues include watering system renovation, lack of water in summertime for agri-purposes, and inter-settlement and intra-communal roads renovation.

There are limited industrial units in the settlement, of which, a privately owned textile-mill producing home and hotel line textile, such as beddings, kitchen and bath textile products; an experiential tool-making factory, Vostan electrostation OSJC, and in the building process a wine factory, again, privately owned named "Vostan".
