= Mohamed Abrini =

Belgian-Moroccan terrorist

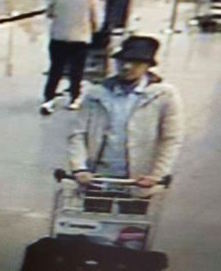
- Still from CCTV footage in Brussels Airport showing Mohamed Abrini
- Born: 27 December 1984 (age 41); Berchem-Sainte-Agathe, Belgium
- Status: Serving a life sentence
- Organization: Brussels ISIL terror cell
- Known for: Islamic terrorism
- Allegiance: Islamic State
- Criminal charges: Involvement in November 2015 Paris attacks and 2016 Brussels bombings
- Trial: Paris attacks trial (8 September 2021 – 29 June 2022)
- Penalty: Life

Mohamed Abrini (Arabic: محمد أبريني, born 27 December 1984) is a Belgian-born Islamic terrorist of Moroccan descent. On 29 June 2022 he was convicted of involvement in the November 2015 Paris attacks and received a sentence of life imprisonment with a minimum term of 22 years. In July 2023, he was convicted of terrorist-related murder and attempted murder for his role in the 2016 Brussels bombings, and given a sentence of 30 years.

== Personal background ==
Abrini was born to Moroccan parents in Berchem-Sainte-Agathe, Brussels, and grew up in the neighbouring district of Molenbeek, where he was a childhood friend of future terrorist Salah Abdeslam. He was convicted of theft aged seventeen and went on to acquire a long criminal record and several prison sentences. It was while he was in prison in 2014 that he learnt of the death of his younger brother who was fighting in Syria.

== Involvement in the November 2015 Paris attacks ==
In June 2015 Abrini went to Syria to visit his brother's grave and met up with Abdelhamid Abaaoud, another childhood friend from Molenbeek. Abaaoud asked him to go to Birmingham to collect £3000, most of which came from housing benefit payments to a Syrian fighter.

Abrini took part in preparations for the Paris attacks and, on 12 November 2015, set off for Paris in a convoy with the other ten terrorists. During the night he took a taxi back to Brussels, where he went into hiding. Two days later he was identified as a suspect when CCTV footage emerged of him with Abdeslam at a service station on 11 November 2015.

== Brussels bombings and arrest ==
While he was in hiding in Brussels, Abrini took part in preparations for the Brussels bombings. On 22 March 2016, he went to Brussels Airport in Zaventem with two other suicide bombers, Najim Laachraoui and Ibrahim el-Bakraoui, but fled without detonating his suitcase of explosives. He was arrested on 8 April 2016 in the Brussels district of Anderlecht and admitted to being the "man in a hat" who had been captured on CCTV at the airport alongside the suicide bombers.

== Paris trial ==
On 8 September 2021, Abrini, along with Abdeslam and 18 others, went on trial at the Palais de Justice in Paris. The trial lasted over nine months, with verdicts announced on 29 June 2022. The prosecution asked for a life sentence with a minimum term of 22 years; Abrini's lawyers, Marie Violleau and Stanislas Eskenazi, argued for a sentence of 30 years, acknowledging Abrini's complicity in the attacks but emphasizing the fact that he had renounced his role as a suicide bomber the night before. The court found him guilty and sentenced him to life imprisonment with a minimum term of 22 years.

== Brussels trial ==
Abrini was due to stand trial for his role in the Brussels bombings in October 2022 but the start of the trial was delayed when lawyers objected to the individual glass cubicles that had been provided for the defendants. The cubicles were replaced by a glass box in the specially built courtroom in the former NATO headquarters. After a trial lasting seven months and jury deliberations lasting eighteen days, Abrini was found guilty of terrorist-related murder and attempted murder. He was sentenced to 30 years in prison.
