= Ibrahim El Bakraoui =

Belgian-Moroccan terrorist

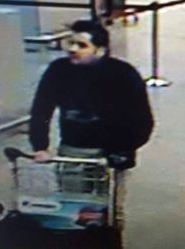
- Still from CCTV footage showing Ibrahim El Bakraoui
- Born: 9 October 1986; Brussels, Belgium
- Status: Deceased
- Died: 22 March 2016 (aged 29); Zaventem, Belgium
- Known for: Involvement in the 2016 Brussels bombings

Ibrahim El Bakraoui (Arabic: إبراهيم البكراوي; 9 October 1986 – 22 March 2016) was a Belgian-Moroccan terrorist who was one of the suicide bombers at Brussels Airport in the 2016 Brussels bombings.

== Personal background ==
Ibrahim El Bakraoui was born on 9 October 1986 in Brussels and raised in Laeken, a residential district in northwestern Brussels. He held dual Belgian and Moroccan nationalities. His father, a retired butcher and devout Muslim, emigrated from Morocco; his mother was described as "conservative and reclusive". His brother Khalid has been identified as the suicide bomber at Maelbeek/Maalbeek metro station in Brussels on 22 March 2016.

In January 2010, he was involved in the attempted robbery of a currency exchange office, where he shot at police with a Kalashnikov rifle while providing a lookout for his accomplices. One police officer was shot in the leg but survived. The then-mayor of Brussels, Freddy Thielemans, and the then-mayor of Molenbeek, Philippe Moureaux, described the shooting as a "fait divers" (a small daily news item) and "normal in a large city", causing controversy.

Later in 2010, Ek Bakraoui was sentenced to 10 years in prison, but was released on parole in 2014 under the condition that he did not leave the country for longer than a month. Following his release from prison, he collected €25,000 in Belgian government benefits until December 2015. He failed to abide by the conditions of parole and was sought again by the authorities.

== Manhunt and terrorist activities ==
According to the authorities in Turkey, they arrested El Bakraoui as a "suspected terrorist" in June 2015 and deported him to Europe, where he chose to go to the Netherlands. Belgian authorities were informed of the detention and deportation, but they apparently ignored the warnings, and the Netherlands released El Bakraoui after failing to establish any link to terrorism.

El Bakraoui and his brother Khalid were known to the Belgian authorities. Unlike other radicalised ISIL adherents, who started as petty criminals, the men had a history of committing more serious crimes. They were believed to have rented an apartment that housed some of the assailants involved in the November 2015 Paris attacks and supplied ammunition for them.

On 15 March 2016, the two brothers evaded capture during a police raid in Brussels. On 16 March 2016, the Federal Bureau of Investigation (FBI) in the United States sent information about them to authorities in the Netherlands. They had been tracking Ibrahim El Bakraoui since September 2015.

Authorities found a laptop belonging to El Bakraoui inside a waste container near a house raided following the bombings. The laptop had a suicide note stored on it, in which El Bakraoui stated that he was "stressed out", felt unsafe, and was "afraid of ever-lasting eternity". It also contained images of the home and the office of the Belgian Prime Minister, Charles Michel, among information on multiple other locations in Brussels.

El Bakraoui has been identified as one of the suicide bombers at the Brussels airport on 22 March 2016.

== See also ==
- Brussels Islamic State terror cell
