= Najim Laachraoui =

Belgian-Moroccan terrorist

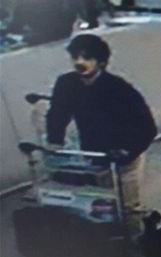
- Still from CCTV footage showing Najim Laachraoui
- Born: 18 May 1991; Ajdir, Taza Province, Morocco
- Died: 22 March 2016 (aged 24); Zaventem, Belgium
- Known for: Involvement in the November 2015 Paris attacks and the 2016 Brussels bombings

Najm al-'Ashrāwī (Arabic: نجم العشراوي, 18 May 1991 – 22 March 2016), also known as Abū Idrīs al-Baljīkī or Soufiane Kayal, was a Belgian-Moroccan terrorist and Islamic State militant who was one of two suicide bombers at Brussels Airport in the 2016 Brussels bombings. The Islamic State confirmed that he was responsible for making all the explosives used in the November 2015 Paris attacks.

== Early life ==
Laachraoui was born in Ajdir, Taza Province, Morocco but raised in the Schaerbeek neighbourhood of Brussels, where he attended a Catholic high school. Laachraoui studied engineering at the Université libre de Bruxelles from 2009 to 2010, but did not complete his degree. He then studied electromechanics at the Université catholique de Louvain from 2010 to 2011.

Laachraoui worked at the Brussels Airport for five years until the end of 2012.

== Islamic State ==
Laachraoui reportedly traveled to Syria in February 2013, where his family lost contact with him. The Islamic State confirmed in Dabiq magazine that he traveled to IS in 2013. He was part of Majlis Shura al-Mujahideen, a group led by Abu Atheer al-Absi. He is described as one of the first to have pledged allegiance to Abu Bakr al-Baghdadi after the dispute between IS and Jabhat al-Nusra. He participated in several battles against the regime of Bashar al-Assad.

He suffered a bullet wound to his leg in battles against Jabhat al-Nusra in the city of Deir Ezzor. It was several months after this wound healed that he began to train to carry out the attack in Brussels. The Islamic State confirmed that he was responsible for preparing all of the explosives used during the November 2015 Paris attacks and the 2016 Brussels bombings.

In 2013 and 2014, he was, according to four ex-hostages, working as a prison guard called "Abou Idriss" for the Islamic State. His travel to Syria resulted in the mayor of Schaerbeek declaring that Laachraoui had been removed from the voting rolls in 2015, but being "powerless to do more".

== Brussels attack ==
In February 2016, Laachraoui was suspected of involvement with a possible terrorist cell led by Khalid Zerkani, who recruited fighters in Syria, including Abdelhamid Abaaoud, the organiser of the November 2015 Paris attacks. He went to trial and was awaiting sentencing at the time of the Brussels bombings, which was scheduled for May 2016.

Like the Bakraoui brothers, Laachraoui evaded capture during the police raids on 15 and 18 March 2016 which captured Salah Abdeslam. Laachraoui is believed to be an accomplice of Abdeslam, with whom he travelled across Europe under the false identity of Soufiane Kayal. Laachraoui is also believed to have made the suicide vests used in the attacks against the Bataclan theatre and the Stade de France in Paris. He also rented a house occupied by assailants involved in the Paris attacks.

In July 2016, IS released a video celebrating several terrorist attacks that took place during the month of Ramadan showing Mohamed Belkaid, and Laachraoui and displaying his nom de guerre Abu Idris al-Beljiki.

== Family ==
Najim Laachraoui was the brother of taekwondo practitioner Mourad Laachraoui, who won a gold medal at the 2016 European Taekwondo Championships and who was expected to compete at the 2016 Summer Olympics, but did not.

== See also ==
- Brussels Islamic State terror cell
