= Karen Northshield =

Survivor of the 2016 Brussels bombings

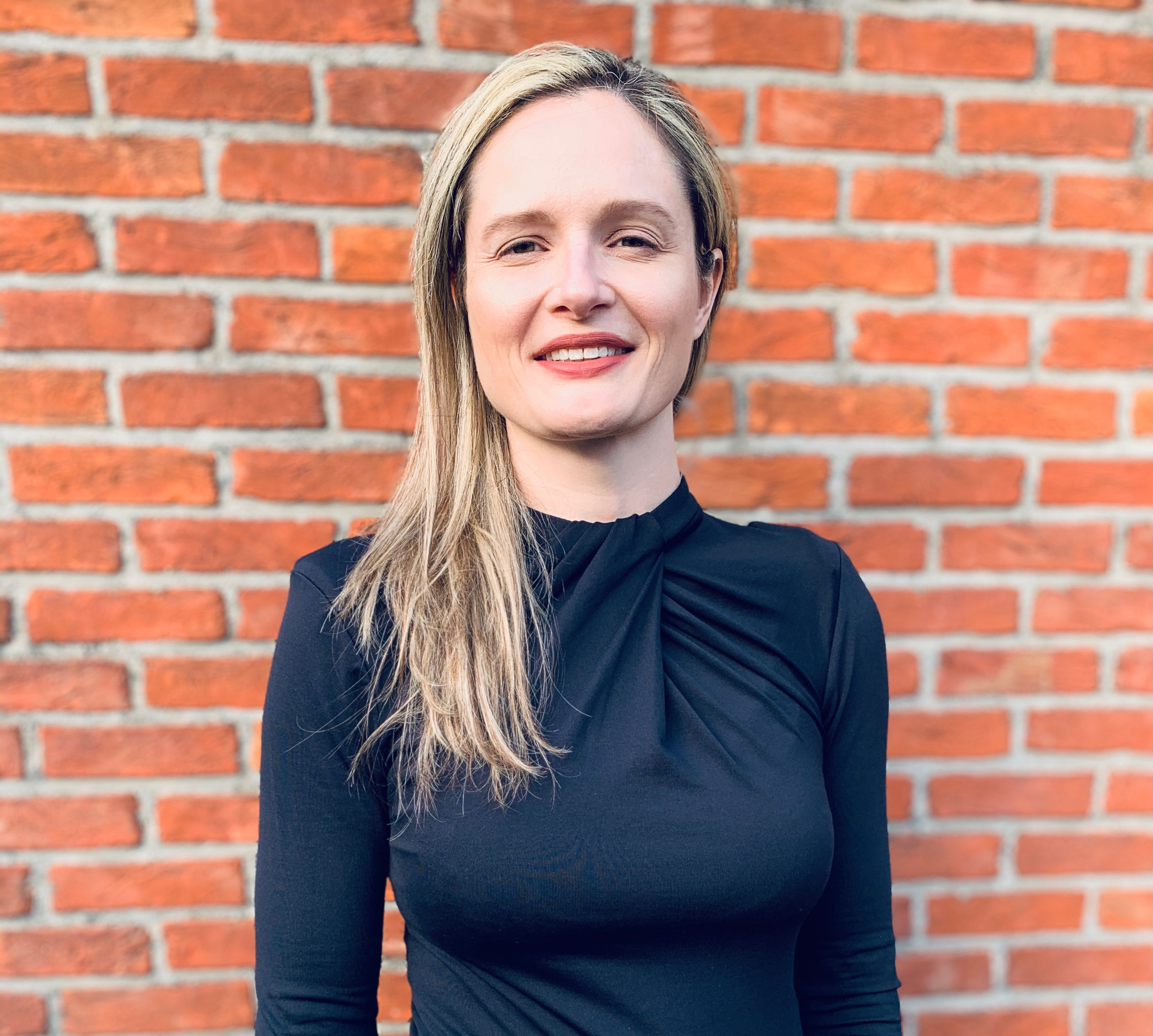
- Born: May 25, 1985 (age 41)
- Education: ULB
- Occupations: Athlete, author
- Known for: Survivor of the 2016 Brussels attacks
- Notable work: Dans le souffle de la bombe
- Website: www.karennorthshield.be

Karen Northshield (born May 25, 1985) is an American–Belgian former top athlete and Belgian swimming champion who survived the Brussels attacks of 22 March 2016 at the Brussels Airport. She wrote a book and gives talks about her experience.

== Biography ==
American Karen Northshield moved to Belgium with her family at the age of nine because her father, a US serviceman, was detached to the NATO department SHAPE. She grew up around Mons and also obtained Belgian citizenship.

Northshield is a former swimmer who was Belgian junior champion in the hundred and two hundred metres butterfly. At the ULB, she obtained a master's degree in multilingual communication and international relations. Northshield had been working as a fitness and yoga instructor for about 10 years when the attack happened.

After years of hospitalisation and ongoing rehabilitation due to the attack, Northshield shares her experience through motivational talks.

== Terrorist attack ==
On the morning of 22 March 2016, two IS terrorists blew themselves up with their homemade bombs at the Brussels airport, killing dozens and injuring hundreds. 30-year-old Karen Northshield was meant to fly to the United States that day to visit her relatives. She was standing in line to check in to Delta Air Lines counter when the first bomb exploded near her, throwing her into the air and landing on the ground dozens of meters away. Her left leg and hip were severely injured. She had severe internal bleeding and her heart stopped beating three times among other severe injuries.

Northshield was taken to the Erasmus Hospital in Brussels, where she lay in a coma for several weeks. She underwent dozens of emergency surgeries to save her life and her left leg. Today, with the help of crutches, she wears an orthosis and an orthopedic left shoe. In the months after, she lost her stomach and spleen due to a life-threatening antibiotic-resistant bacterial infection. An experimental treatment with a bacteriophage eventually cured the infection. The scientific journal Nature published an article about it.

Northshield had to learn the rudimentary basics to include sitting and walking again. She also sustained severe hearing loss with tinnitus from the attack. After about 60 surgeries, more than three years in hospital and at a rehab center as a polytraumatic patient, she experienced severe post-traumatic stress disorder back at home.

== Aftermath ==
Like many other surviving victims and relatives of dead victims, she raised the issue of lack of support from the Belgian government and insurance companies. The Belgian government's Office for Victims of Violence supported her, but only for a short period of time. Like many other victims, Northshield has to constantly prove administratively over the years how that the attack rendered her disabled for the rest of her life.

== Publication ==
In March 2021, Northshield released her autobiographical book in Dutch (Weggeblazen door de bom) and French (Dans le souffle de la bombe) about the attack and its impact on her life. In early 2022, the Lobby Awards honoured her with the "L'hommage de l'année" award ("Tribute of the year") for the militancy she described in her book that contains a message of hope and resilience.

== Bibliography ==
- Karen Northshield - Weggeblazen door de Bom (2021), Kennes Publishing (ISBN 9789464006414)
- Karen Northshield. "Dans le souffle de la bombe (2021), Kennes Publishing" (PDF). Article in The Lancet (p. 452).

== See also ==
- 2016 Brussels bombings
