= Benoît van Innis =

Belgian cartoonist and visual artist (1960–2024)

- Van Innis in 2012
- Born: 25 May 1960; Bruges, Belgium
- Died: 24 February 2024 (aged 63)
- Education: Saint-Luc Institute of Fine Arts
- Occupations: Cartoonist; Visual artist

Benoît van Innis (25 May 1960 – 24 February 2024) was a Belgian cartoonist and visual artist.

== Biography ==
Born in Bruges on 25 May 1960, van Innis was the son of a legal advisor. He dropped out of secondary school and attended the Saint-Luc Institute of Fine Arts in the studio of Dan Van Severen, from where he graduated in 1984. He cited René Magritte, William Steig, Saul Steinberg, Glen Baxter, and Ronald Searle as his main graphic influences.

Van Innis's work was popular in Dutch-speaking magazines such as HUMO, Knack, and Vrij Nederland and the newspapers De Morgen, De Standaard, NRC Handelsblad, and de Volkskrant. His French-language publications were included in Le Vif/L'Express, Lire, Le Magazine Littéraire, Le Monde, and Paris Match. He also published in the American magazines Esquire and The New Yorker.

Van Innis's first book, Rire en automne à Bruges, was prefaced by Ever Meulen and published by B. Barrault in 1989. The following year, he published his second book, Le Musée interdit, accompanied by an introduction from poet Roland Jooris and published by Magic Strip. In 1991, he participated in the collective album Les Aventures du latex - La bande dessinée européenne s'empare du préservatif. In 2008, he published works based on the compositions of Erik Satie and Francis Poulenc.

In addition to his cartoons, van Innis was known for his tiling art. Some of his murals can be found at the Université catholique de Louvain, the main square in Deinze, the general hospital in Wingene, Jan Breydel Stadium, during Bruges' time as the European Capital of Culture, the Olympic swimming pool in Antwerp, and the Maelbeek metro station. The 2016 Brussels bombings saw the destruction of his works in the Maelbeek metro station, which he replaced to pay homage to the victims. The work was inaugurated on 18 July 2016, containing an olive tree to symbolize peace and accompanied by a poem in Dutch, French, and the six languages of UNESCO.

Benoît van Innis died on 24 February 2024, at the age of 63.

== Works ==
=== In French ===
- Rire en automne à Bruges (1989)
- Le Musée interdit (1990)
- Voyages aux pays de nulle part (1990)
- Oncle Gilbert (1995)
- Bleu outremer (1997)
- Le Vent est bleu (2002)
- La Table (2008)

=== In Dutch ===
- Bravo! Bravo! (2000)

=== Cartoon albums ===
- Les Aventures du latex - La bande dessinée européenne s'empare du préservatif (1991)
