= 2016 Brussels bombings =

Islamic State suicide bombings in Belgium

- Part of Islamic terrorism in Europe and the spillover of the Syrian Civil War
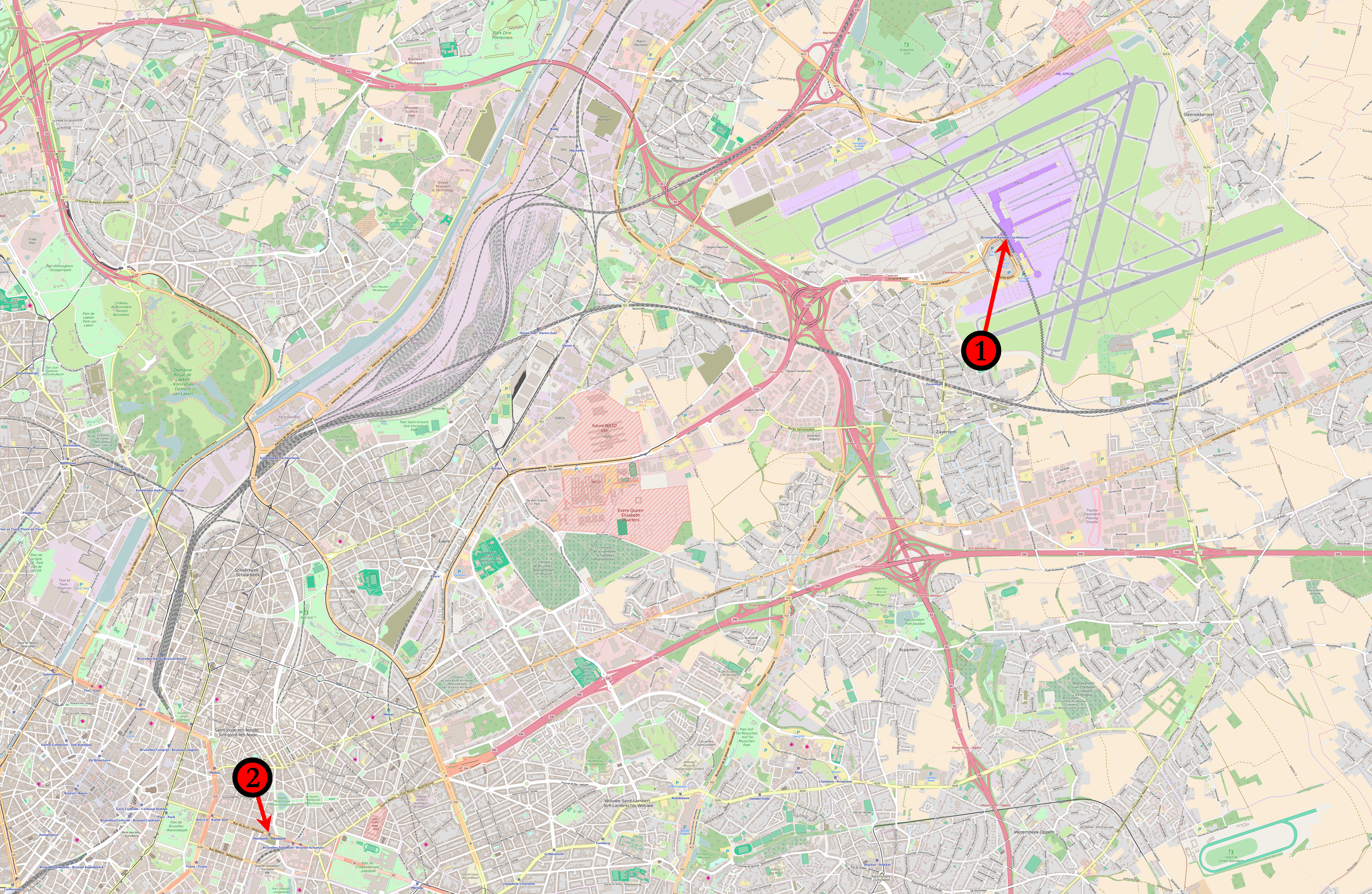
- Map of the bombings in relation to each other; (1) 07:58: Departure hall of Brussels Airport; (2) 09:11: Maelbeek/Maalbeek metro station
- Location: Airport: 50°54′05″N 4°29′04″E; Metro station: 50°50′38″N 4°22′36″E; Brussels Airport in Zaventem and Maelbeek/Maalbeek metro station in Brussels, Belgium
- Date: 22 March 2016; 10 years ago 07:58 am – 09:11 am (UTC+1)
- Target: Civilians and transport hubs
- Attack type: Suicide bombings; mass murder; Islamic terrorism
- Weapon: Nail bombs filled with TATP explosives
- Deaths: 35 (32 victims, (Note: Revised to 35 in 2023, with one survivor dying by suicide, one survivor dying by euthanasia, and one survivor dying from cancer after his treatment was paused due to treatment for injuries from the attack. Further revised in 2026, with a relative of a victim dying by suicide.) 3 perpetrators)
- Injuries: 340
- Perpetrator: Islamic State (Brussels cell)
- Assailants: Airport: • Ibrahim El Bakraoui (died); • Najim Laachraoui (died); • Mohamed Abrini; Metro station: • Khalid El Bakraoui (died); • Osama Krayem
- Motive: Islamic extremism

On 22 March 2016, two coordinated terrorist attacks in and close to Brussels, Belgium, were carried out by the Islamic State (IS). Two suicide bombers detonated bombs at Brussels Airport in Zaventem just outside Brussels, and a third detonated a bomb on a train leaving Maelbeek/Maalbeek metro station in the city's European Quarter. Thirty-two people were killed and more than 300 were injured. The three perpetrators also died in the explosions. A third airport attacker fled the scene without detonating his bomb, which was later found in a search of the airport. A second metro attacker also fled, taking his bomb with him. The Islamic State claimed responsibility for the attacks.

The perpetrators belonged to a terrorist cell that had been involved in the November 2015 Paris attacks and the attacks happened shortly after a series of police raids targeting the group. The Belgian Government declared three days of national mourning after the bombings, which were the deadliest attacks on Belgium since World War II.

In December 2022, ten men accused of involvement in the attacks went on trial in Brussels. Six were convicted of terrorist-related murder and attempted murder, while two were convicted of terrorist activities.

== Background ==
Belgium was a participant in the military intervention against the Islamic State during the War in Iraq. In September 2014, the Belgian Chamber of Representatives voted to send six F-16s for one month to support the US-led coalition.

Belgium had more nationals fighting for jihadist forces as a proportion of its population than any other Western European country, with an estimated 440 Belgians having left for Syria and Iraq as of January 2015. Estimates suggested that Belgium had supplied the highest per capita number of fighters to Syria of any European nation, with 350 to 550 fighters, out of a total population of 11 million that includes fewer than 500,000 Muslims. Some reports have claimed Belgium's weak security apparatus and competing intelligence agencies made it a hub of jihadist-recruiting and terrorist activity, while others assert that Belgium faces the same problems as many European countries in this regard. According to Kenneth Lasoen, security expert at Ghent University, the attacks happened more as a result of policy failure rather than intelligence failure.

=== Terrorist cells in Brussels ===
Before the bombings, several Islamist terrorist attacks had originated from Belgium, and a number of counter-terrorist operations had been carried out there. Between 2014 and 2015, the number of wiretapping and surveillance operations directed at suspected terrorists by Belgian intelligence almost doubled. In May 2014, a French gunman who had spent over a year in Syria, attacked the Jewish Museum of Belgium in Brussels, killing four people. In January 2015, anti-terrorist operations against a group thought to be planning an imminent attack had left two suspects dead in the town of Verviers, with raids in Brussels and Zaventem also being carried out. In August 2015, a terrorist shot and injured a passenger aboard a high-speed train on its way from Amsterdam to Paris via Brussels, before he was subdued by other passengers.

The November 2015 Paris attacks were co-ordinated from Belgium and Brussels was locked down for five days to allow the police to search for suspects with the aid of the military. On 18 March 2016, four days before the Brussels bombings, Salah Abdeslam and another suspect in the Paris attacks were captured after two anti-terrorist raids in Brussels. A third suspect was killed during one of the raids. During questioning the day after his arrest, Abdeslam claimed not to know the El Bakroui brothers or to recognise them from photographs. Belgian investigators believed that Abdeslam's arrest may have hastened the Brussels bombings. According to the Belgian Interior Minister, Jan Jambon, who spoke after the bombings, authorities knew of preparations for an extremist act in Europe, but they underestimated the scale of the attack.

== Attacks ==
Timeline of attacks

- 7:33 – The three attackers arrive at Brussels Airport in a taxi.
- 7:58 – Two explosions occur in the airport's check-in area, 9 seconds apart.
- 9:04 – Belgium raises the terror threat level to its highest level.
- 9:11 – An explosion occurs in Brussels Maelbeek/Maalbeek metro station.
- 9:27 – All public transport is suspended in the city.
- 11:15 – Eurostar rail journeys between London and Brussels are cancelled until further notice.
- 13:57 – Bomb disposal officers detonate a third bomb at Brussels Airport.
All times are CET (UTC+1).

There were two coordinated attacks: two attackers exploded nail bombs at Brussels Airport, and one attacker exploded a bomb at Maelbeek metro station.

=== Brussels Airport ===
Two suicide bombers, carrying explosives in large suitcases, attacked the departure hall at Brussels Airport in Zaventem. The first explosion occurred at 07:58 in check-in row 11; the second explosion occurred about nine seconds later in check-in row 2. The suicide bombers were visible in CCTV footage. Some witnesses said that before the first explosion occurred, there were shouts in Arabic. Some also reported hearing gunfire but investigators established that no shots were fired, although both suicide bombers were carrying handguns which had detonated due to the explosions.

A third suicide bomber left the airport without detonating his bomb, which was later found in a search of the airport and destroyed by a controlled explosion.

=== Maelbeek metro station ===
Just over an hour later, at 9:11, a suicide bomber detonated a bomb in a rucksack in the middle carriage of a three-carriage train at Maelbeek metro station, located near the European Commission headquarters in the European Quarter of Brussels, 10 kilometres (6 mi) from Brussels Airport. The train was travelling on line 5 towards the city centre, and was pulling out of Maelbeek metro station when the bomb exploded. The driver immediately stopped the train and helped to evacuate the passengers. The Brussels Metro was subsequently shut down at 09:27.

A second suicide bomber carrying a bomb in a rucksack left the metro without detonating his bomb, instead taking it back to a hideout in Etterbeek, an eastern municipality of Brussels, where he dismantled it.

== Victims ==
Deaths by citizenship
Citizenship	Deaths
Belgium	14
United States	4
Netherlands	3
Sweden	2
Democratic Republic of Congo (Note: A Congolese-Belgian man)	1
China	1
India	1
Italy (Note: An Italian-Belgian woman)	1
Morocco (Note: A Moroccan-Belgian woman)	1
Germany	1
Peru	1
Poland	1
United Kingdom	1
Total	32

Thirty-two people, excluding the three suicide bombers, were killed in the attacks and over 300 were injured. Sixteen died in the airport attack and sixteen in the metro attack. The bombings were the deadliest attack on Belgium since World War II.

Seventeen of the victims were Belgian (including three with dual nationality) and the rest were foreign nationals. Foreign victims came from different countries including the US, the Netherlands, Sweden, Germany, the United Kingdom, Poland, China, India and Peru. They ranged in age from 20 years to 79 years.

Among the fatalities at the airport was retired diplomat André Adam, who had served as Belgian Permanent Representative to the United Nations and as Ambassador to the United States.

On 25 July 2023, a Brussels court ruled that three people who had died in the years following the attacks should be recognised as victims and the official number of victims was revised from 32 to 35. One woman died by euthanasia due to psychological suffering, one man died by suicide and one man died of cancer, his treatment having been interrupted due to the injuries he sustained in the metro bombing. On 22 March 2026, the total was further revised to 36 after the suicide of a Swedish woman whose mother had been killed in the airport attack.

== Perpetrators ==
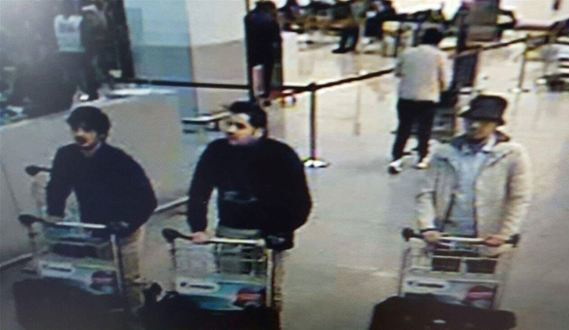
Still from CCTV footage showing Najim Laachraoui (left), Ibrahim El Bakraoui (centre), and Mohamed Abrini (right).

=== Profiles ===
A total of five attackers took bombs into the airport and metro, with three of them dying in suicide bombings and the remaining two, who left without detonating their bombs, arrested sixteen days later. All five had also been involved in the planning and organisation of the November 2015 Paris attacks. They were identified and named as:

- Ibrahim El Bakraoui, aged 29, was one of the suicide bombers at Brussels Airport. In 2010, he had shot and injured a police officer during an attempted robbery at a currency exchange office. He was sentenced to 10 years in prison but was released early. In June 2015 he was arrested in Turkey near the Syrian border and deported. He was wanted in connection with the Paris attacks.
- Najim Laachraoui, aged 24, was one of the suicide bombers at Brussels Airport. He had travelled to Syria in 2013. He is believed to have made the bombs used in the Paris attacks.
- Khalid El Bakraoui: aged 27, the younger brother of Ibrahim El Bakraoui, carried out the suicide bombing at Maelbeek metro station. In 2012 he received a prison sentence for a violent car-jacking. He was wanted for breaching his parole conditions and also in connection with the Paris attacks.
- Mohamed Abrini, born 27 December 1984, fled Brussels Airport without detonating his bomb. He was arrested on 8 April 2016. He was a childhood friend of brothers Salah Abdeslam and Brahim Abdeslam, who were both involved in the Paris attacks. On 29 June 2022 at a court in Paris, Abrini was convicted of involvement in the attacks and received a sentence of life imprisonment with a minimum term of 22 years.
- Osama Krayem: born 16 August 1992, accompanied Khalid El Bakraoui to the metro but fled without detonating his explosives. He was arrested on 8 April 2016. Having grown up in Sweden, he went to Syria in 2015 and joined the IS group. On 29 June 2022 at the Paris attacks trial, he was sentenced to 30 years in prison.

=== Investigation ===
The airport attackers had ordered a taxi from an address on the Rue Max Roos/Max Roosstraat in Schaerbeek, a northern municipality of Brussels, on 22 March 2016. Within half an hour of the airport attack, the taxi driver had contacted police. On hearing of the attacks on the radio, he became suspicious of his previous passengers who had refused his offer of help with loading and unloading their heavy suitcases, and had left a chemical smell in the taxi. He went to a police station and was able to recognise the three men from security camera video of Brussels Airport which showed the attackers pushing the suitcases containing bombs on luggage trolleys in the departure hall. This early lead allowed the police to search the apartment on the Rue Max Roos the same day. They found a suitcase bomb that had been left behind because it would not fit into the taxi, and also bomb making material and equipment and an IS flag. Earlier in the morning of 22 March 2016, municipal workers clearing rubbish in the Rue Max Roos had retrieved a laptop from a bin. When they realised that it contained IS-related material they handed it to the police. Analysis of the laptop revealed numerous files relating to IS, the Paris attacks, potential targets (including the Belgian Prime Minister Charles Michel), as well as messages, texts, wills and photographs created by the Brussels attackers.

On 24 and 25 March 2016 police arrested twelve people in raids in Belgium, France and Germany. One man was identified as the third airport attacker, the "man in the hat" seen on CCTV with the two suicide bombers at the airport on the day of the attacks. He was charged with terrorist offences. It turned out to be a case of mistaken identity and the man was released after providing an alibi. Abrini later admitted to being the "man in the hat". The FBI's Next Gen Identification System facial recognition software helped confirm the identification of the "man with the hat" on CCTV footage as Abrini.

While the airport attackers were using the hideout in the Rue Max Roos in Schaerbeek, the metro attackers were using a hideout in the municipality of Etterbeek in the south-east of Brussels. Analysis of phone records had located them in the area on the morning of the attacks, but it was only after the arrest of Krayem on 8 April 2016 that police were given the address of a studio apartment in the Avenue des Casernes/Kazernenlaan. A search of the studio revealed little, as it had in the meantime been cleaned, but CCTV recording from the entrance hall of the block allowed investigators to track the movements of members of the Brussels cell who had stayed at or visited the address.

== Aftermath ==
The Islamic State claimed responsibility for the attacks later on the same day, saying that Belgium had been attacked as "a country participating in the international coalition against the Islamic State".

Raids and searches were made across Belgium, while security was heightened in a number of countries as a result of the attacks.

=== Belgium ===
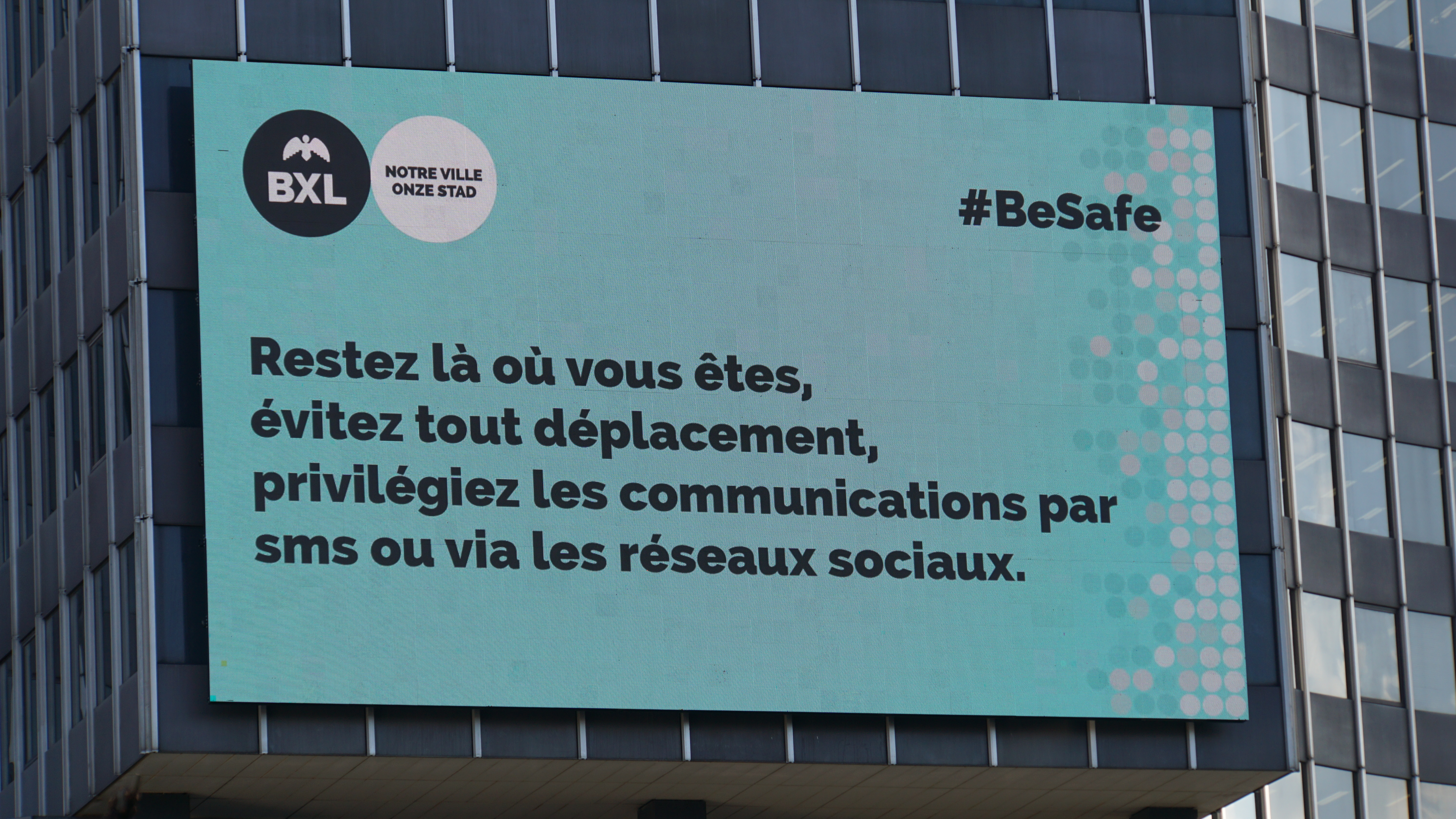
Digital billboard in Brussels. It reads, in French, "Stay where you are, avoid all movement, prioritise communications by text message or social media."

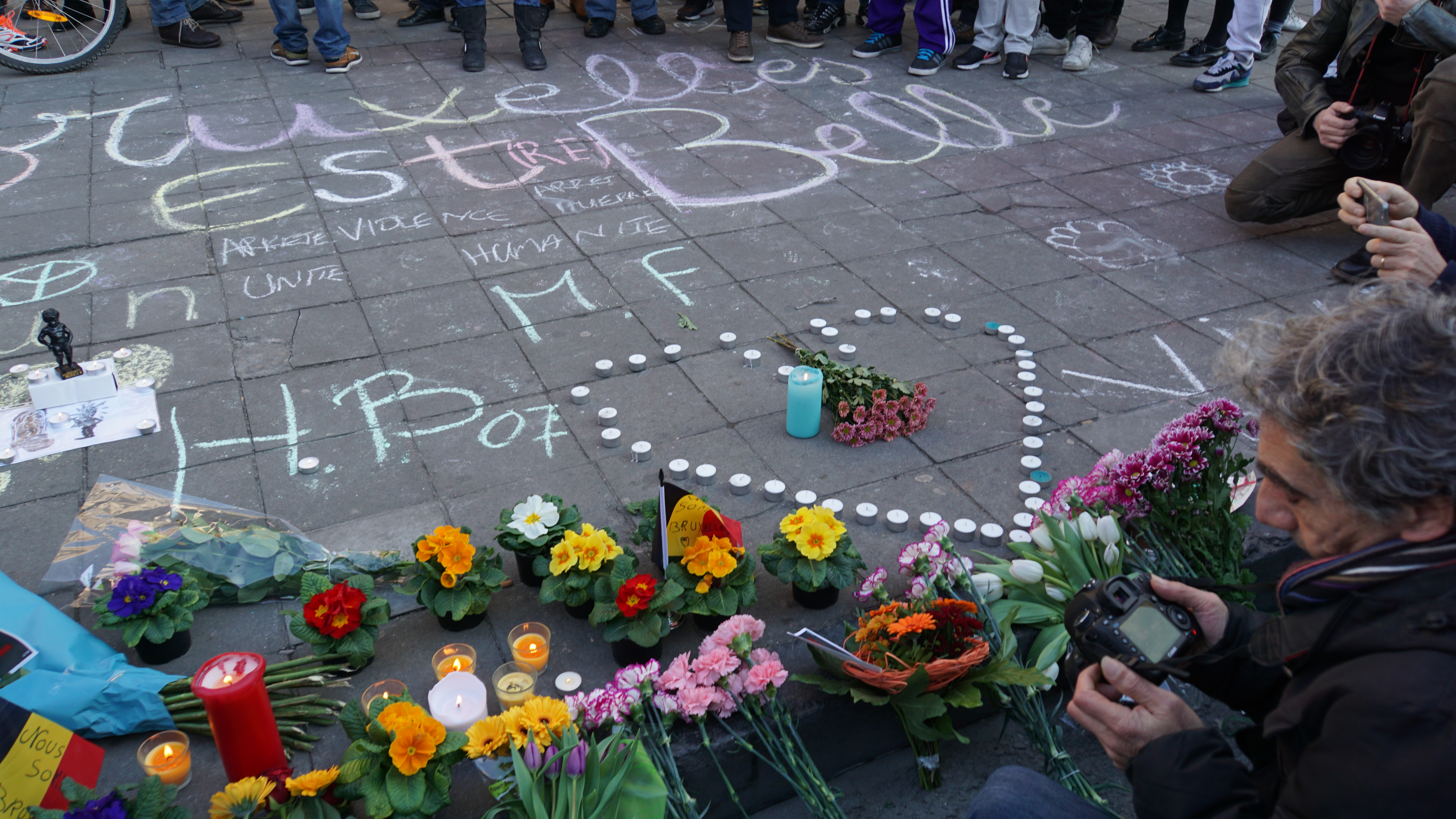
People gathering, chalk drawings and flowers for the victims. The largest message says (translated from French), Brussels is beautiful, with further inscriptions of Stop violence, Stop war, Unity, and Humanity.

Air traffic to Brussels Airport was halted after the attacks and passenger flights did not resume until twelve days later, on 3 April 2016, with three Brussels Airlines flights leaving for Faro, Turin and Athens. The re-built departure hall partially re-opened on 1 May 2016 with heightened security causing long queues. All public transport in Brussels was shut down following the attacks, with major railway stations also closed and Eurostar and Thalys journeys cancelled. Maelbeek metro station re-opened on 25 April 2016. After the attacks, enhanced security measures were introduced at Brussels Airport and in the metro.

Following the attacks Belgium raised its terror threat to the highest level of four, lowering it again to three on 24 March 2016. The government expanded the military protection of potential targets, that had been in place since January 2015, to include more soft targets and public places (Operation Vigilant Guardian). Temporary border checks were implemented by Belgian and French authorities at some major crossings on the France-Belgium border. The country's two nuclear power plants – Tihange and Doel – were partially evacuated as a precaution.

The federal government announced three days of national mourning, lasting from Tuesday 22 March until Thursday 24 March, and flags were flown at half-mast on public buildings. There was also a one-minute silence held at noon local time on 23 March, which ended with spontaneous applause and chants of "Vive la Belgique" at the Place de la Bourse/Beursplein. Five days after the attacks, disturbances broke out at the makeshift memorial in the Place de la Bourse resulting in riot police using water cannon to disperse right-wing demonstrators.

There was immediate condemnation of the attacks from Belgian Muslim groups such as the League of Imams in Belgium and Executive of the Muslims in Belgium, who publicly condemned the bombings and expressed their condolences to the victims and their families. On 1 April, religious leaders in Brussels gathered together for a memorial to the victims of the bombings. They expressed their desire to spread a religious message of unity throughout Belgium, and to combat extremism.

The mayor of Molenbeek, to which several of the terrorists involved in the Brussels and Paris attacks had connections, commenced a clean-up operation with the help of national authorities. Some mosques were closed for using incendiary language and an investigation mounted into nonprofit organisations in the area with links to illegal activities or religious radicalism. It was found that of 1,600 nonprofit organisations registered in the district, 102 had links to criminal activities, including 51 with links to religious radicalism or terrorism.

After the attacks two non-profit organisations, Life4Brussels and V-Europe, were set up to help victims.

On 29 March 2016, it was revealed that Ibrahim and Khalid El Bakraoui were released early from prison (in 2015 and 2013 respectively) due to a law introduced in 1888 known as Lejeune, which allows inmates to be released after serving a third of their sentence. Belgian Interior Minister Jan Jambon stated that the government had agreed to update the law in 2014.

A report commissioned by the government suggested that Belgium had lost nearly €1 billion as a result of the attacks with the hospitality and retail industries being especially hard hit.

On 3 January 2019, a hard disk containing autopsy reports of victims of the Brussels attacks was amongst items stolen from a medical examiner's office in the Portalis court building in Brussels. A man who had previously been convicted of terrorist offences was charged with the theft.

=== Other countries ===
In the aftermath of the attacks, security was tightened at airports, railway stations and other key sites in Europe and across the world.

== Reactions ==
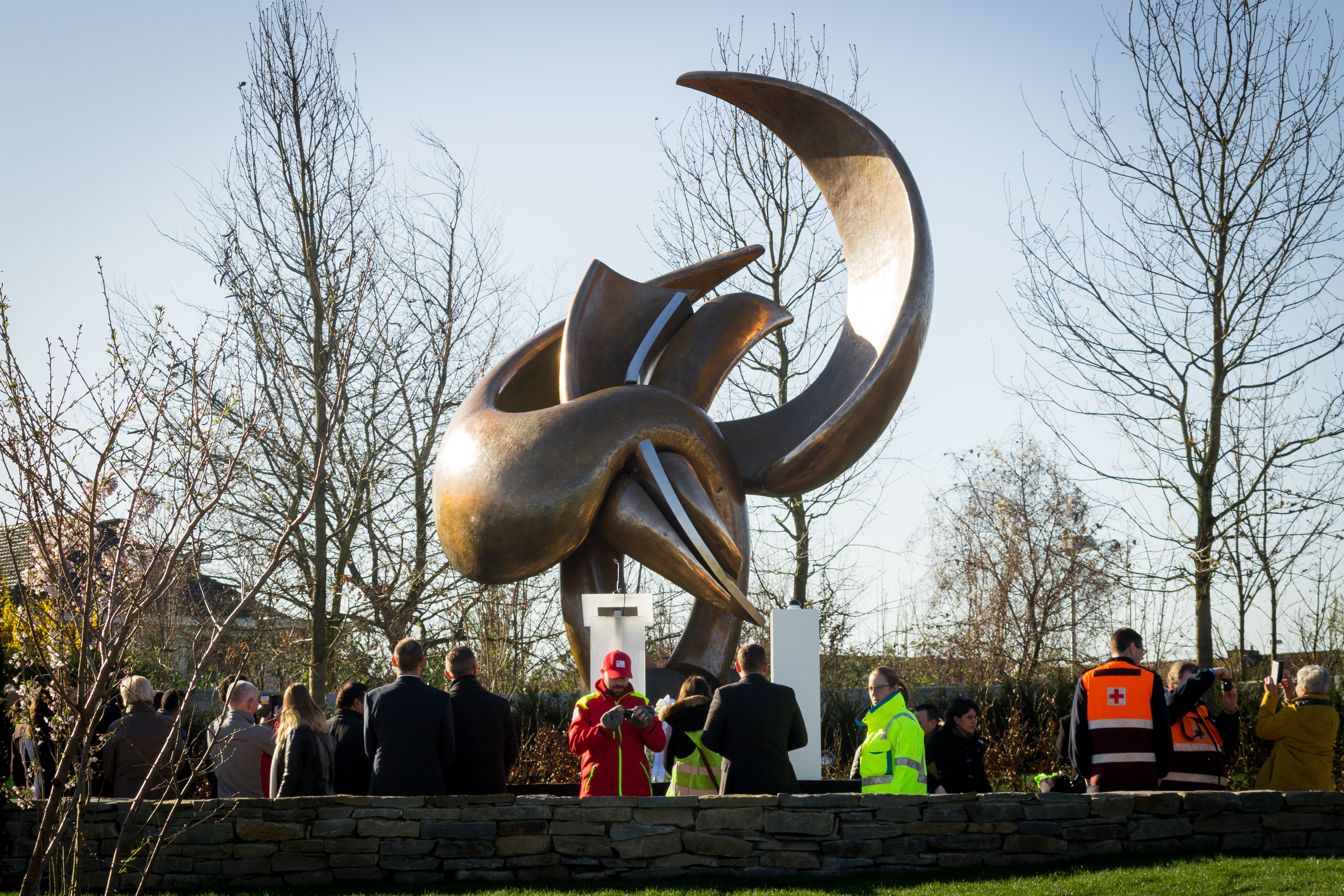
The sculpture Flight in Mind by the artist Olivier Strebelle was damaged in the attacks. After some months of restoration, the sculpture was relocated to an outdoor area of the airport. It is seen here on the 1st anniversary of the attacks.

On the evening of 22 March 2016, King Philippe gave a televised address to the nation. The following day, he and Queen Mathilde visited the airport, as well as some of the injured in hospital.

Following the attacks, a number of structures around the world were illuminated in the colours of the Belgian flag, including the Brandenburg Gate in Berlin, the Burj Khalifa in Dubai, the Eiffel Tower in Paris, the National Gallery in London's Trafalgar Square, the Royal Palace in Amsterdam, and the Trevi Fountain in Rome. In New York City, the One World Trade Center was lit up, while the spire of the Empire State Building went dark.

Hours after the attack, the French-language hashtag #JeSuisBruxelles (#IamBrussels) and images of the Belgian comic character Tintin crying trended on social media sites. Also, hashtags such as #ikwilhelpen (#Iwanttohelp) and #PorteOuverte (#Opendoor) were used by Brussels residents who wanted to offer shelter and assistance for people who might need help. Facebook activated its Safety Check feature following the attacks.

While there was overwhelming support for Belgium, some used the attacks to support their political views and debate the issue of Islam in Western countries. Some expressed concern over the disproportionate emphasis placed on the attacks in Brussels over similar attacks in other countries, particularly in Turkey, where an attack had occurred just days before.

== 2014 murder ==
It is thought that the El-Bakraoui brothers were responsible for the unsolved murder in 2014 of an elderly man who was shot as he walked home from a café in the Jette area of Brussels. Abrini and Krayem told investigators that the brothers had said that they carried out the murder to see what it was like to kill someone. The victim's widow was told in 2020 that it was almost certain that the El-Bakraoui brothers had killed her husband, although officially the case was closed.

== Parliamentary inquiry ==
On 14 April 2016, the Belgian Federal Parliament established a commission of inquiry into the attacks and the failure of the security forces to prevent them. The commission was also given the task of examining the emergency response to the attacks and assistance to victims, the development of radicalism in Belgium, and the structure of the country's security services. Between August 2016 and October 2017, the commission published four interim reports: "Emergency response"; "Assistance to the victims"; "Security architecture"; "Radicalism". The commission identified a number of problems with security forces: government and security forces running in parallel rather than together; faulty communications both within the country and with foreign counterparts of Belgian services; a failure to pay sufficient attention to proactive action and prevention of terrorism and radicalism; the underfunding of various security units; a lack of cooperation between units; a need for improved cooperation with European and international agencies; a proliferation of rules and procedures that threatened to exacerbate a lack of coherence in policy. The commission identified a need for security forces to strengthen information management and establish an information-sharing culture within and between the security services. Whilst some services had too little information others suffered from information overload. The commission's report also addressed a number of criticisms levelled at Belgium by the French parliamentary investigation into the November 2015 Paris attacks.

== Trial ==
In December 2022, ten men went on trial in Brussels for their involvement in the bombings. Oussama Atar, thought to have been killed in Syria, was tried in absentia. The nine accused who appeared in court were Mohamed Abrini, Osama Krayem, Salah Abdeslam, Sofien Ayari, Bilal El Makhoukhi, Hervé Bayingana Muhirwa, Ali El Haddad Asufi, Smail Farisi and Ibrahim Farisi. All except Ibrahim Farisi were charged with belonging to a terrorist group and terrorist-related murder and attempted murder. Ibrahim Farisi was charged only with belonging to a terrorist group. Six of the accused (Abrini, Krayem, Abdeslam, Ayari, El Haddad Asufi and Atar) had already been convicted in the Paris attacks trial. The Farisi brothers were on bail, while the others were all detained. The trial took place with a jury before presiding judge Laurence Massart in the Justitia building (the former headquarters of NATO) in Evere, Brussels.

The trial was scheduled to start in October 2022 but was delayed as the defence lawyers objected to the design of the box, which then had to be rebuilt. In December and January there were interruptions to the trial as the defendants objected to being strip-searched before their transfer from prison to the courtroom.

The verdicts were announced on 25 July 2023 after the jury had deliberated for eighteen days. Six of the accused, Atar, Abrini, Abdeslam, El Haddad Asufi, El Makhoukhi and Krayem were found guilty of terrorist-related murder and attempted murder. Ayari and Muhirwa were convicted of terrorist activities but cleared of murder and attempted murder while the Farisi brothers were cleared of all charges against them.

After the verdicts, the court took a summer break. The jury and three judges then deliberated for five days over sentences, which were announced on 15 September 2023. Krayem, El Makhoukhi and Atar received life sentences. Abrini was sentenced to 30 years, El Haddad Asufi to 20 years, and Muhirwa to 10 years. Abrini and Ayari did not receive sentences, as the court considered that the 20-year sentences they had been given in 2018 for the Forest shootout, were sufficient.

== Memorials ==
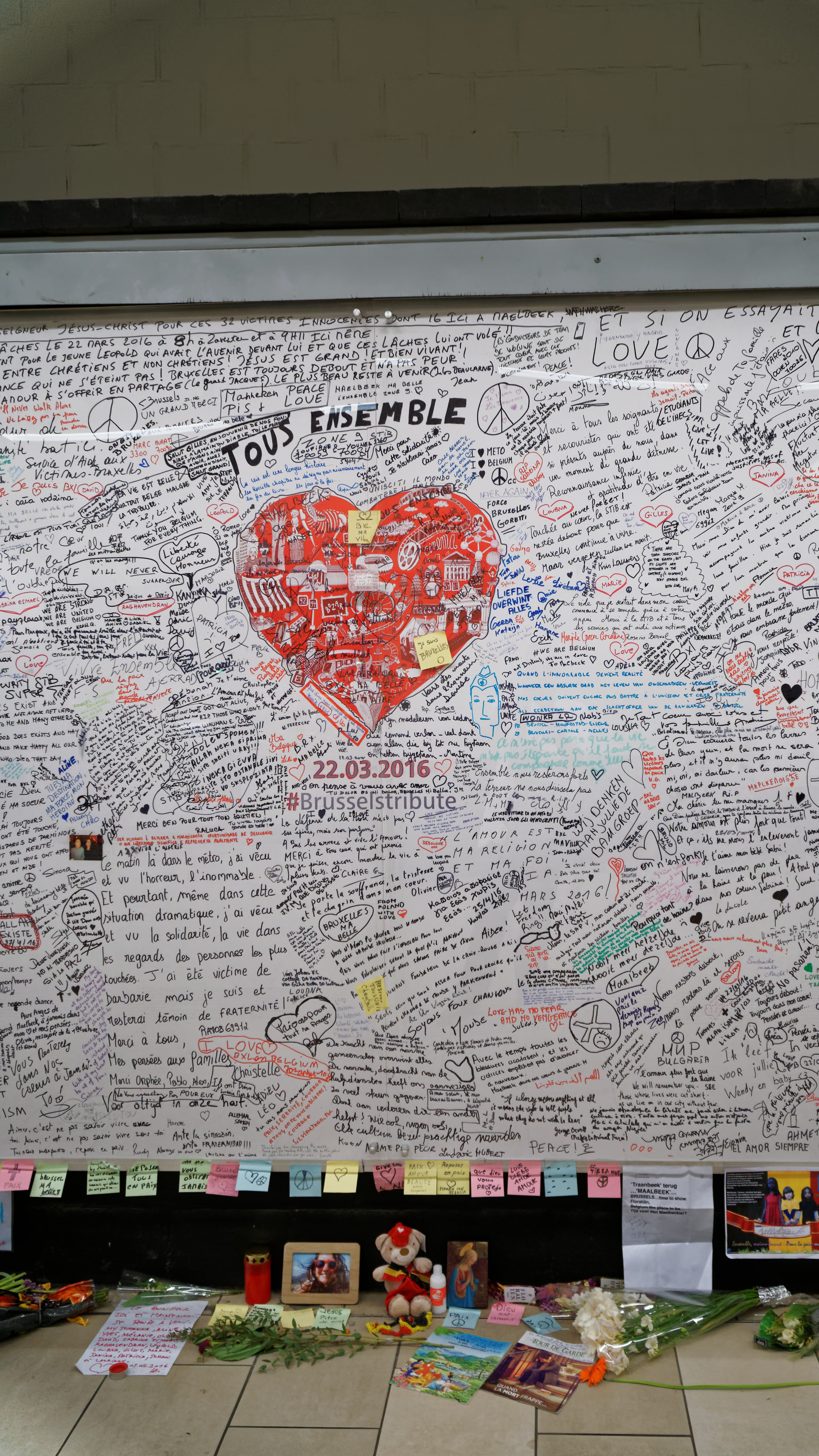
Wall of messages at Maelbeek metro station

In the aftermath of the attacks, the population of Brussels created spontaneous memorials as a societal reaction to what was perceived as a collective tragedy. In the hours following the attack, people started gathering at the Place de la Bourse/Beursplein. Mourners wrote chalk messages on the pavement and buildings surrounding the square. Numerous messages and mementos, usually every-day objects such as mugs or hats, were left at the Bourse memorial. According to Ana Milosevic, a researcher at KU Leuven, societal tensions and the need for answers about the causes and consequences of the attacks were salient in the first days and weeks after the event. During the two months of its existence, the Bourse memorial was used as a site of contestation and negotiation of the meanings associated with the terrorist attacks.

The Archives of the City of Brussels were asked by the mayor Yvan Mayeur and the city council to collect and document the societal reactions to the attacks. Over two months, the archives team documented the process of memorial creation, also collecting some of the memorabilia left by the mourners.

In November 2016, a sculpture in memory of the victims of the bombings was inaugurated in the Place Communale/Gemeenteplein (Municipal Square) of Molenbeek. The sculpture, called the Flame of Hope, was created by local artist Moustapha Zoufri.

There is a memorial plaque in the departure hall of Brussels Airport, and, in the nearby Memorial Garden, a plaque listing the 16 people who died in the airport attack was inaugurated on 22 March 2018.

Following a public competition, a monument to the victims was unveiled by King Philippe on the first anniversary of the attacks on the pedestrianised section of the Rue de la Loi/Wetstraat, between Schuman metro station and the Parc du Cinquantenaire/Jubelpark. The monument, by Jean-Henri Compère, is called Wounded But Still Standing in Front of the Inconceivable and is constructed from two 20 metres (66 ft) long horizontal surfaces rising skywards.

The Brussels-Capital Region also created a memorial to the attacks with a land-art work by Bas Smets, who planted 32 birches (one for each victim) in the Sonian Forest (Drève de l'Infante/Infantedreef) called Memorial 22/03. Smets describes the memorial as "a place of silence and meditation". The birches are connected by a circular structure and separated from the rest of the forest by a small round canal.

In Maelbeek metro station, a commemorative mural called The Olive Tree was created by Benoît van Innis, who previously designed the metro station, and a list of the sixteen victims was unveiled at the third commemorative anniversary next to the mural.

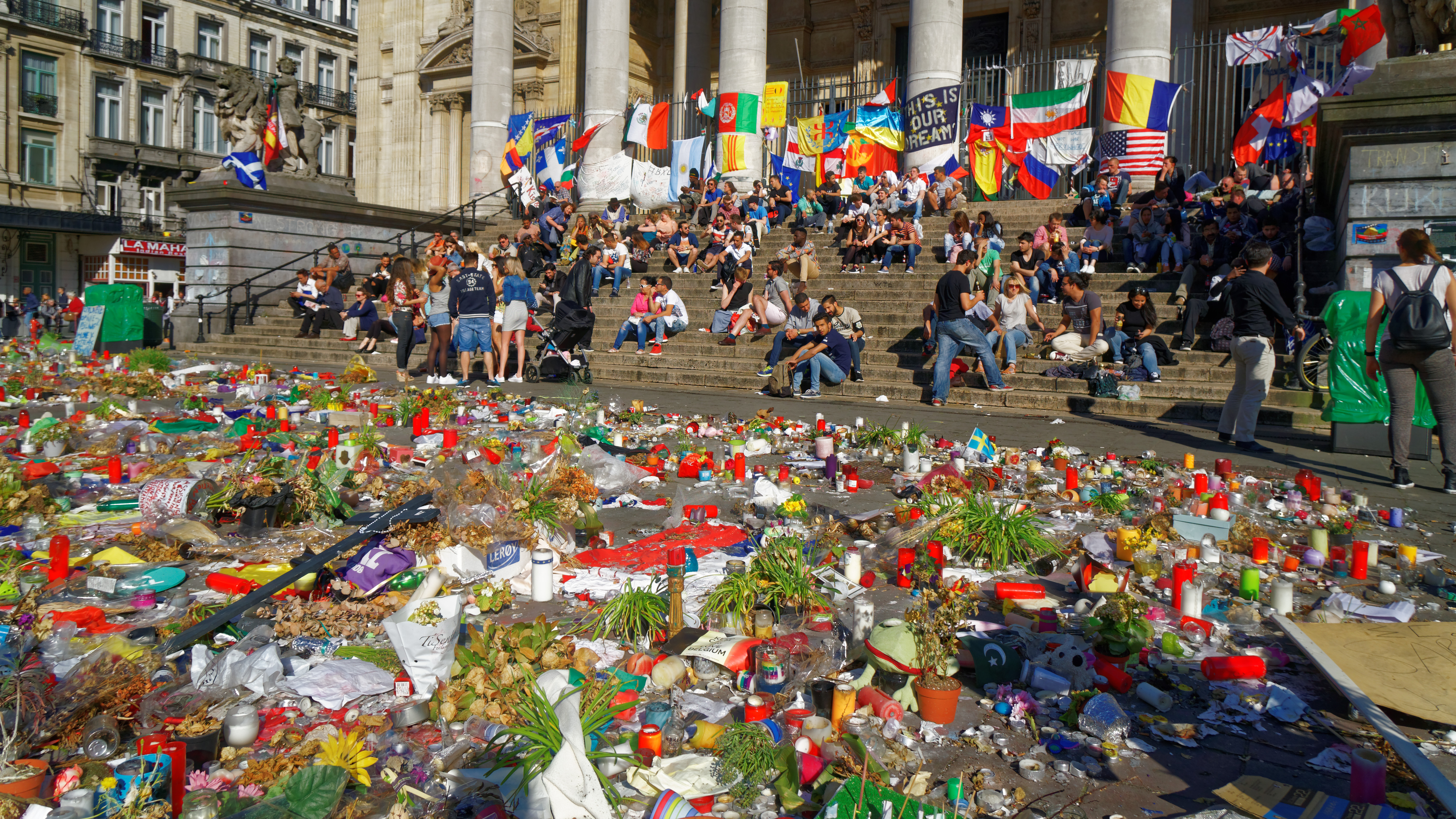
The impromptu memorial at the Place de la Bourse/Beursplein

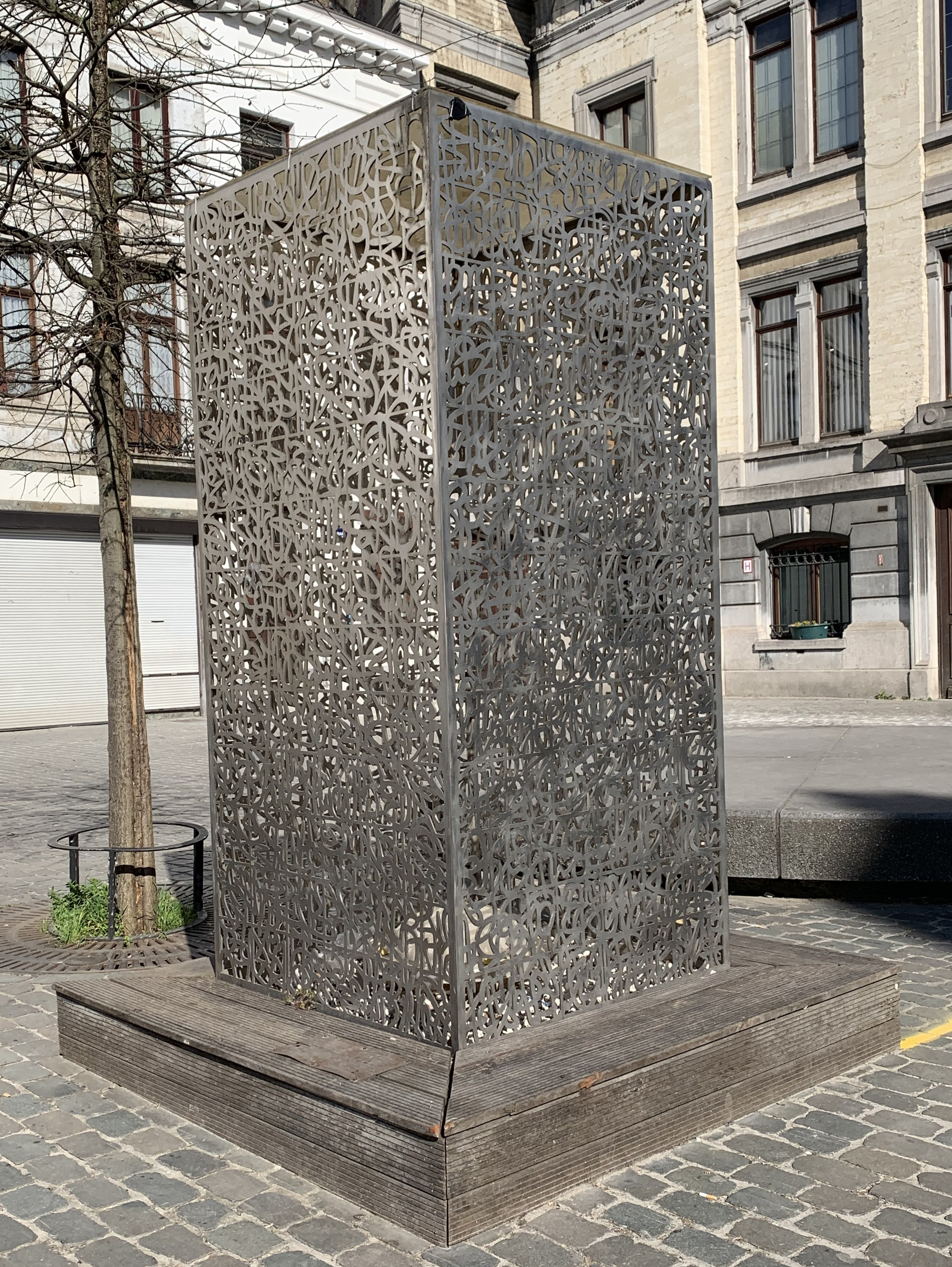
The Flame of Hope by Mustapha Zoufri in Molenbeek, in honour of the victims of the Paris and Brussels attacks

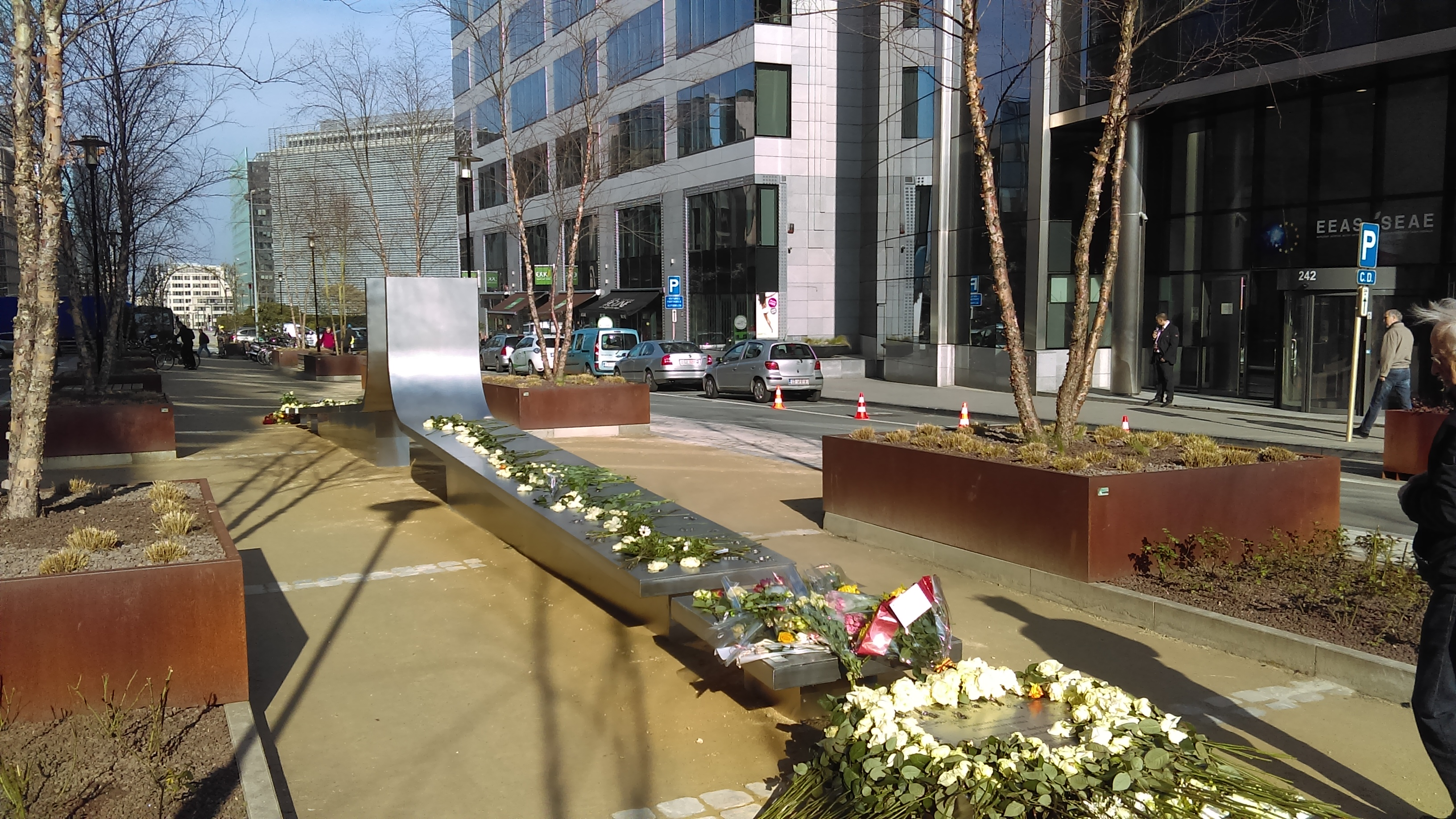
Wounded But Still Standing in Front of the Inconceivable, Rue de la Loi/Wetstraat, Brussels

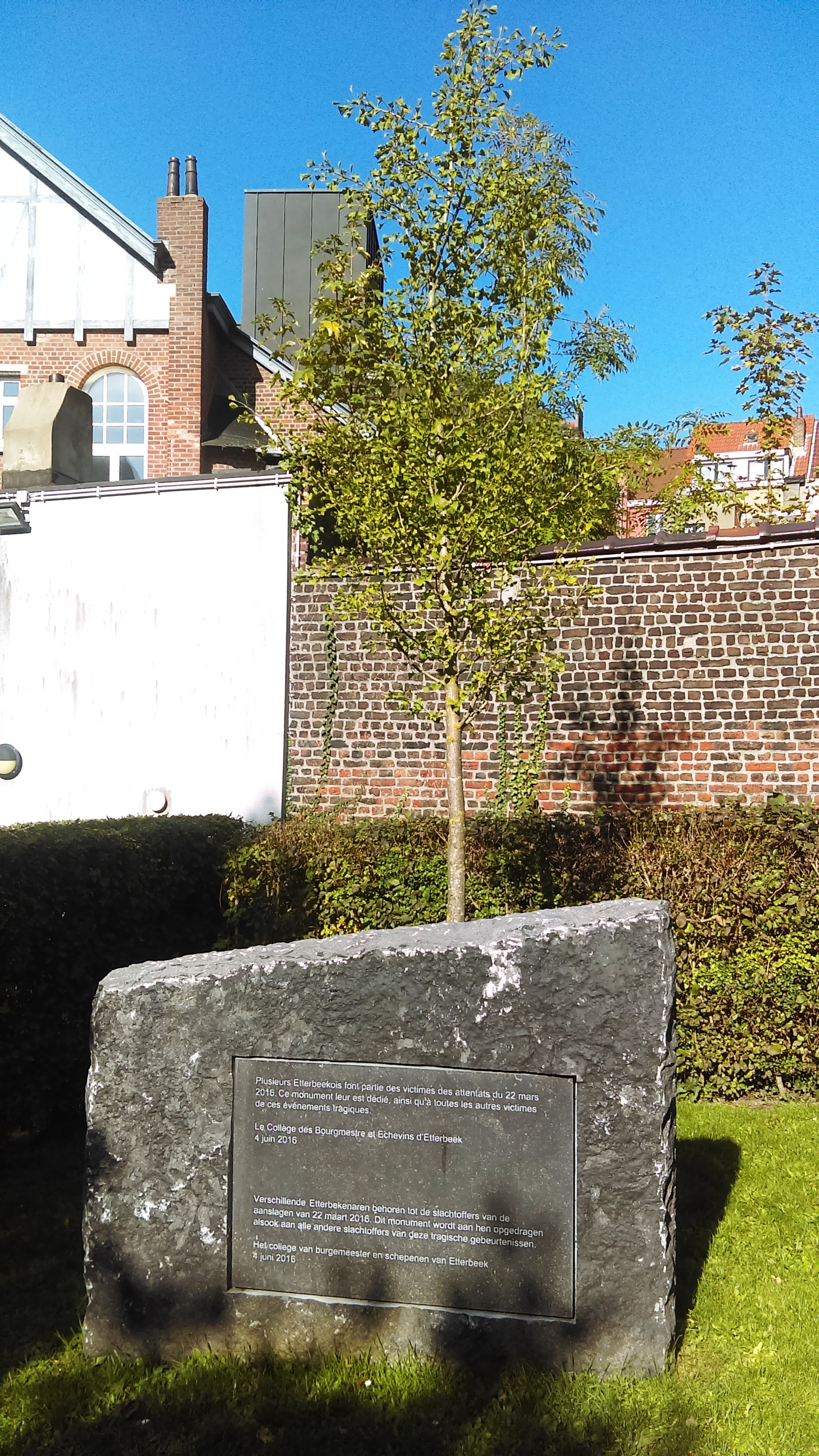
Memorial to the attacks of 22 Mars 2016, Etterbeek (Jardin Felix Hap)

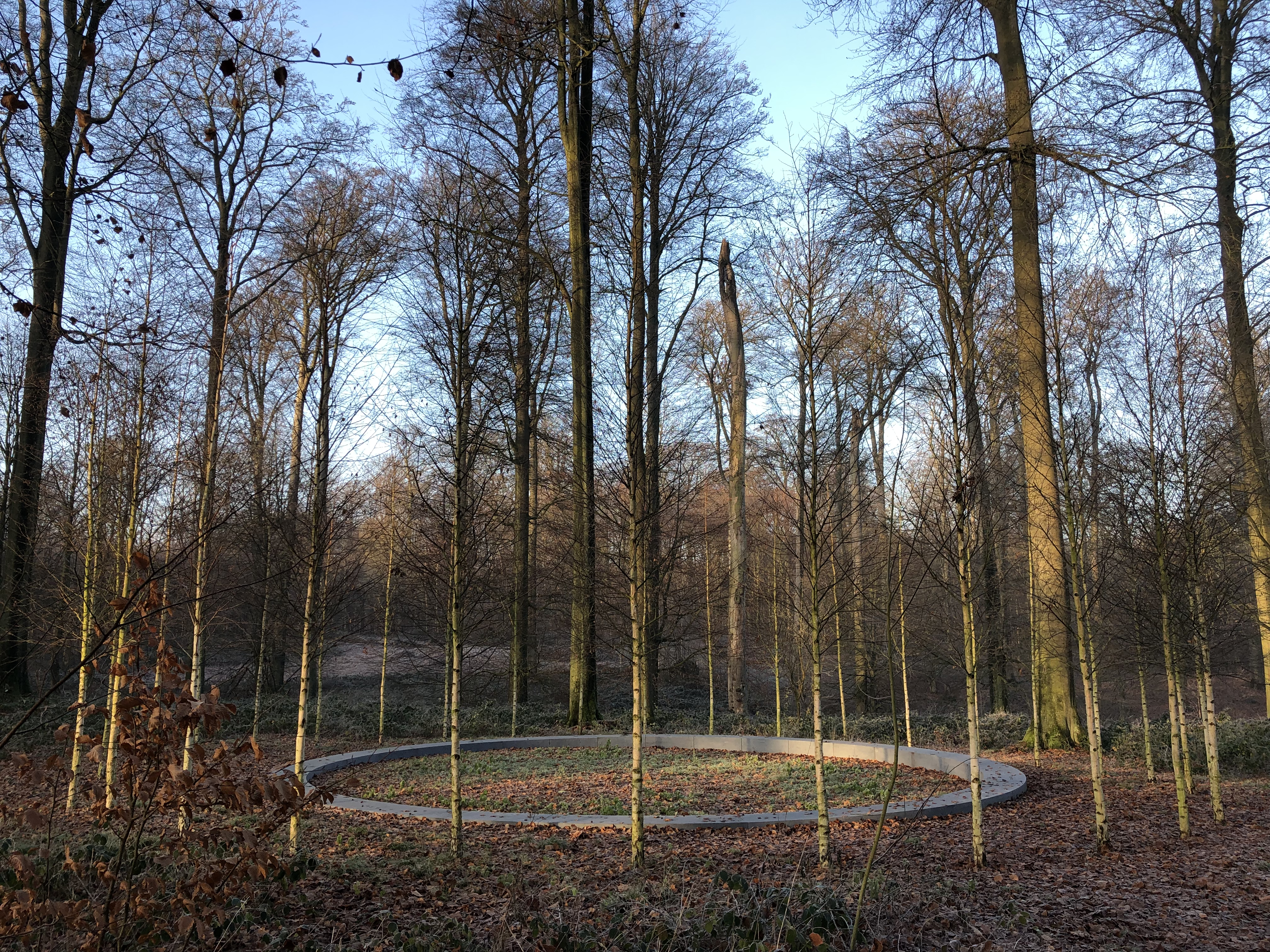
Memorial 22/03 by Bas Smets in the Sonian Forest

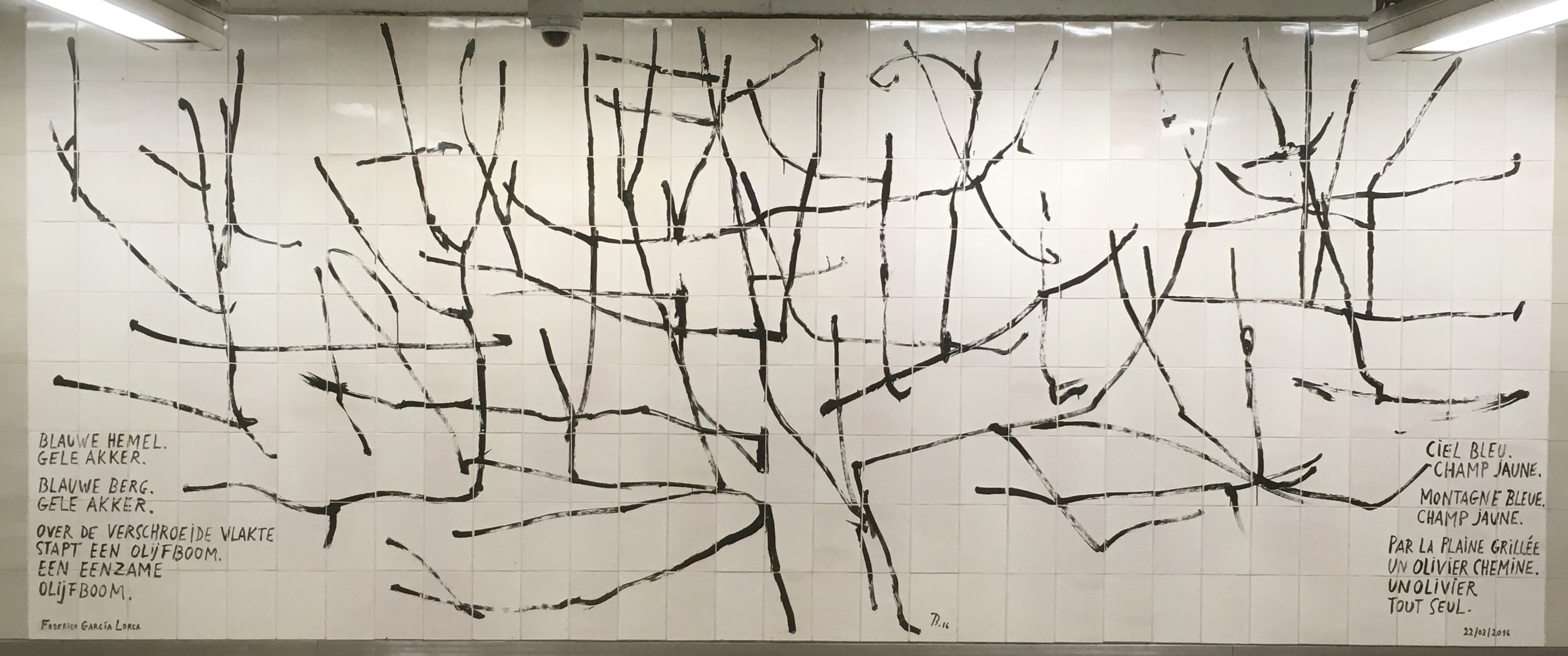
The Olive Tree by Benoît van Innis in Maelbeek metro station

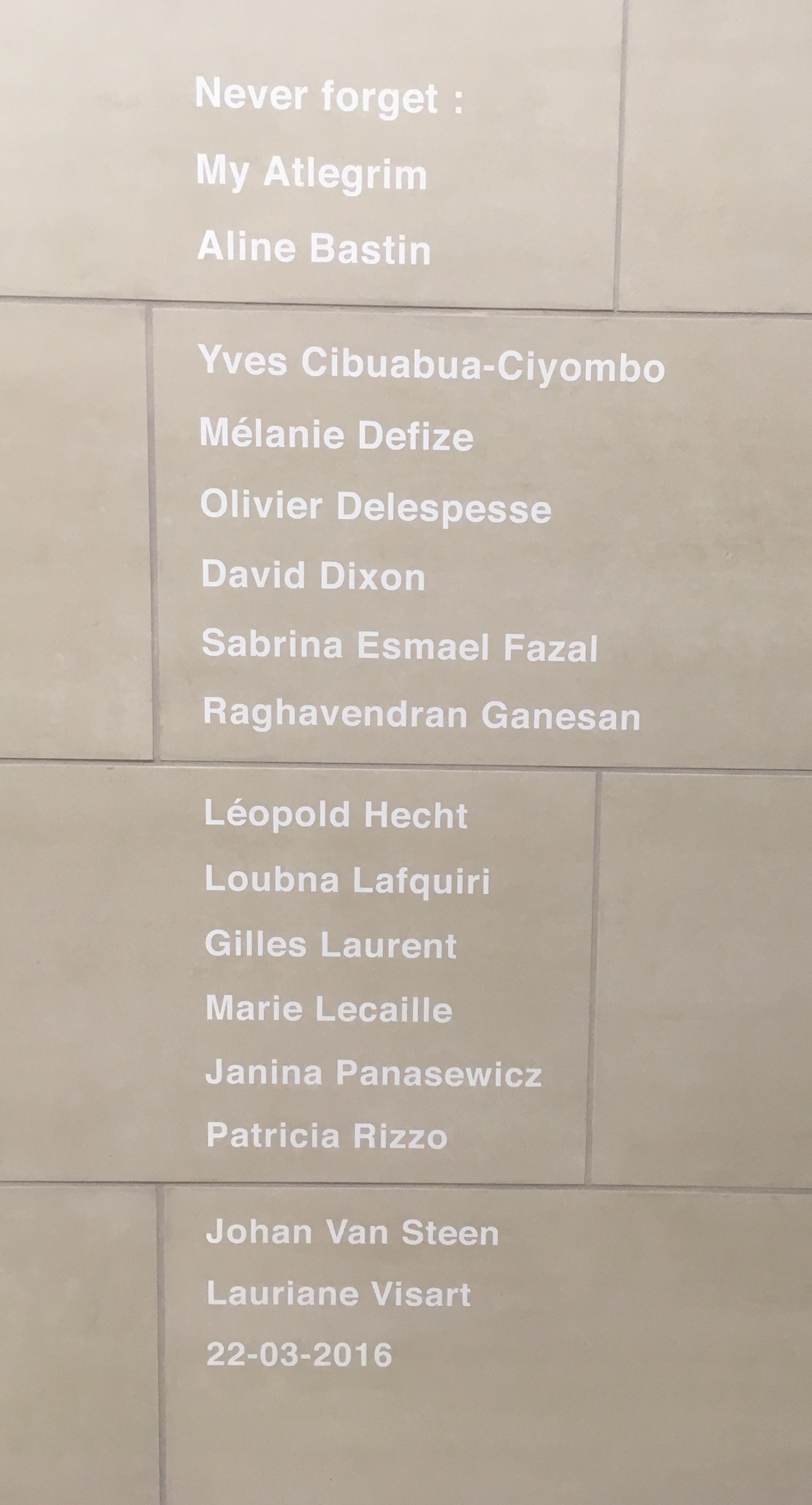
Memorial plaque for the 16 victims in Maelbeek metro station

== See also ==
- August 2017 Brussels attack
- June 2017 Brussels attack
- Jewish Museum of Belgium shooting
- List of Islamist terrorist attacks
- List of terrorist incidents linked to ISIL
- Terrorism in the European Union
