= 2016 Brussels police raids =

Coordinates: 50.8086°N 4.3145°E

- Part of the aftermath of the November 2015 Paris attacks
- Type: Police raid
- Target: Forest and Molenbeek, Belgium
- Date: 15/18 March 2016
- Outcome: Salah Abdeslam and 4 other suspects arrested
- Casualties: 15 March: 1 suspect killed; 4 police officers injured; 18 March: 2 suspects injured; 5 arrests

On 15 and 18 March 2016, Belgian police carried out raids on houses in Brussels. The raids were conducted in connection to the attacks in Paris four months earlier. In the raids, one suspect was killed and five others were arrested, including Salah Abdeslam, the only surviving member of the 10-man unit that carried out the November 2015 Paris attacks.

== Raids ==
=== 15 March ===
Police carried out a raid on a house in the Rue du Dries/Driesstraat in Forest, a municipality of Brussels. They had received intelligence that Khalid El Bakraoui, who was wanted in connection with the Paris attacks, had rented a flat at 60, rue du Dries, under a false name. Since the water and electricity had been cut off two weeks previously, they assumed the flat was empty. Four Belgian police officers, accompanied by two French colleagues, arrived in the afternoon to carry out a routine search for fingerprints and other evidence, only to be met by gunfire. Two Belgian officers and a French officer were injured. The police retreated and called for reinforcements, allowing two men to escape from a first floor window at the back of the property, while a man with a Kalashnikov rifle continued to fire from a window at the front, injuring a fourth police officer. After a siege lasting three hours, a police sniper shot and killed the gunman. The dead gunman was identified by police as Algerian national Mohamed Belkaid, who had lived in Sweden and travelled to Syria in 2014. An Islamic State (IS) flag, ammunition and detonators were found in the flat, raising fears that another attack was being planned. One week later, El Bakraoui and four other members of the Brussels terrorist cell carried out bomb attacks at Brussels Airport and the metro. Also found in the flat were fingerprints and DNA of Abdeslam, and he was assumed to be one of the men who had escaped.

=== 18 March ===
After fleeing from the Rue du Dries, Abdeslam contacted a second cousin, Abid Aberkane, who took the two fugitives to his mother's flat in the Rue des Quatre-Vents/Vier-Winden-Straat in Molenbeek municipality of Brussels, not far from the Abdeslam family home. Aberkan was already under police surveillance, which led them to Abdeslam. On the afternoon of 18 March, police took up position outside the house and ordered the occupants of the ground floor to come out. After ten minutes, Abdeslam came out of the door and started to run off down the street. Police shot and wounded him in the leg and then arrested him. Tunisian Sofien Ayari, who was the other fugitive from the Rue du Dries flat, was arrested and sustained an injury. Belgian prosecutors said that both men were charged with participation in terrorist murder and the activities of a terrorist group. Aberkane, his wife and his mother were also arrested, with his mother being released without charge.

== Reactions ==
In the wake of the raid, French President François Hollande called Abdeslam's arrest "an important moment". French Prime Minister Manuel Valls also welcomed Abdeslam's arrest and added that more work needed to be done in tracking down terrorist cells in Europe.

== Trials ==
Abdeslam and Ayari went on trial at the Palace of Justice in Brussels on 5 February 2018 for attempted murder during the Forest shootout. They were found guilty and on 23 April 2018 were each sentenced to 20 years in prison, the penalty requested by the prosecution.

In September 2021 both men went on trial along with eighteen others for their role in the Paris attacks. Abdeslam received a full-life term, while Ayari was sentenced to 30 years in prison. In December 2023 they went on trial in Brussels along with eight others for the Brussels bombings.

In 2022 Abid Aberkane went on trial in Brussels and received a suspended three year prison sentence for having provided a hiding place for Abdeslam.

== See also ==
- 2015 Saint-Denis raid
- Brussels lockdown
- January 2015 anti-terrorism operations in Belgium
