= Osama Krayem =

Swedish terrorist (born 1992)

- Born: 16 August 1992 (age 34); Malmö, Sweden
- Other name: Naïm or Naim al Hamed
- Citizenship: Swedish
- Known for: the burning alive of a Jordanian pilot (2015); November 2015 Paris attacks; 2016 Brussels bombings
- Status: Incarcerated
- Allegiance: Islamic State: in Syria; Brussels terror cell
- Convictions: Terrorist murder (32 counts, in Brussels); Attempted terrorist murder (695 counts); War crime and terrorist murder (1 count for each crime, in Syria); Membership in a terrorist organization

Details
- Date: January 2015 (murder in Syria); 13 November 2015 (Paris attack); 22 March 2016 (Brussels attack)
- Locations: Syria (2015); Paris (2015); Brussels (2016)
- Killed: 36 (32 + 3 indirect in Brussels, 1 in Syria)
- Injured: 340 (in Brussels)
- Date apprehended: 8 April 2016
- Imprisoned at: undisclosed location, Belgium

Osama Krayem (Arabic: أسامة كريم; born 16 August 1992), who also used the name Naïm or Naim al Hamed, is a Swedish-born convicted terrorist and mass murderer. He is of Palestinian descent, born in Malmö to parents who immigrated from Syria. In 2022 he was sentenced to 30 years in prison for having assisted in planning the 2015 Paris attacks including obtaining weapons, and in 2023 and 2025 twice to life in prison for participation in the 2016 terror attacks in Belgium and in the 2015 ISIL-perpetrated burning alive of a Jordanian Air Force pilot.

Krayem was involved in the 2015 Paris bombings and the 2016 Brussels bombings.

In Brussels, he was one of five men arrested on 8 April 2016 by the Belgian police. On 25 July 2023 Krayem was found guilty of terrorist murder in the 2016 attacks. Krayem had been seen with the Metro bomber who blew himself up at Maelbeek.

Krayem was present at the burning alive of the Jordanian pilot Muath al-Kasasbeh, which U.S. President Barack Obama described as "vicious".

== Personal background ==
Krayem was born in 1992 in Malmö, Sweden, to Palestinian immigrants from Syria and grew up in Rosengård, Malmö Municipality. At eleven years old, he participated in the 2005 documentary "Utan gränser – en film om idrott och integration" (Without Borders – A Film About Sports and Integration), a film described by Swedish newspaper Aftonbladet as "a documentary on how to succeed with integration" of migrants into Swedish society.

Krayem is thought to have radicalized in his early twenties, frequently watching videos by Anwar al-Awlaki, an American and Yemeni imam and Islamic lecturer and alleged senior recruiter and motivator involved in planning terrorist operations for the Islamist militant group Al-Qaeda. Krayem also reportedly tried to recruit other Arab Swedish youth to join the fight in Syria.

Until he was arrested in Brussels on 8 April 2016, he was one of Europe's most wanted fugitives, considered to be a hardened operative of the Islamic State of Iraq and the Levant (ISIL).

The Wall Street Journal reported that on 20 April 2016 that Belgian authorities spelled the subject's first name as "Ossama," where previously it had been publicised as "Osama." His detention was extended by one month on the same day.

== Terrorist activities ==
Krayem left Sweden sometime in 2014 to join ISIL in Syria to fight alongside the anti-Assad Islamic militant group. He was said to be one of the first Muslim Swedes to have left the country to join ISIL. In January 2015, he was identified by the Swedish press yet again in a Facebook post sent to his brother in Sweden showing him reportedly in Deir ez-Zor, Syria dressed in military fatigues, standing in front of an ISIL flag and holding an AK-47. On 14 March 2015, he uploaded a film clip to his Facebook page showing an execution of a 19 year old Palestinian from Jerusalem. Several people from Malmö, among them Krayem's brother and friends, liked the clip along with individuals in Syria.

Krayem later returned to Europe using a false passport travelling the migrant route from Syria to Turkey to Leros, Greece where he presented himself on 20 September 2015 as Naïm Al Hamed (identified as a Syrian national born on 1 January 1988 and originating from Hama, Syria, according to the falsified papers). Under this guise as Naïm Al Hamed, he continued to Europe residing in Belgium.

=== November 2015 Paris attacks ===
In October 2015, Krayem allegedly met Salah Abdeslam in Ulm, Germany to discuss possible cooperation in terrorist attacks. On 19 April 2016, Krayem was linked to the November 2015 Paris attacks, as it was determined that his DNA was present in the apartments used by the assailants. In June 2018 he was extradited to France into custody of the National Gendarmerie to be interrogated on his role in the 13 November Paris attack, where 130 were killed. In June 2022 he was sentenced to 30 years in prison for having assisted planning of the Paris attacks including obtained weapons. At trials it was also disclosed that Krayem and Tunisian Sofien Ayari also both were involved in planning a separate attack on Amsterdam airport as part of the same cell.

=== 2016 Brussels bombings ===
Krayem is believed to be the man seen on CCTV at the Brussels City 2 shopping centre, where he bought the rucksacks later used for the 22 March 2016 terror attack in Brussels Airport in Zaventem. His DNA was found in the Schaerbeek (Brussels) apartment used by the Zaventem airport bombers. He is also believed to have been the second man alongside bomber Khalid El Bakraoui at the Pétillon metro station. El Bakraoui is thought to have carried out the bombing of Maelbeek metro station minutes later on the morning of 22 March 2016. During interrogation, Krayem confessed that he was the second metro bomber also carrying a backpack full of explosives, and explained that he felt regret at the last moment and therefore never tried to detonate his suicide bomb.

On 25 July 2023, Krayem was found guilty of terrorist murder in the 2016 attacks in Belgium. Krayem was sentenced to life in prison.

=== The killing of Muath al-Kasasbeh ===
During trial in 2018, Belgian investigators found that Krayem was at the scene where 26-year-old Royal Jordanian Air Force pilot Muath Al-Kasasbeh was burned to death by ISIL in January 2015.

In January 2025, Swedish authorities announced that Krayem was to be tried at a criminal court in Sweden for his involvement in the killing of al-Kasasbeh. Krayem was transferred to Sweden from France for the trial and charged with acts of terrorism and various war crimes.

On 31 July 2025, the Stockholm District Court found Krayem guilty of war crimes and acts of terrorism in connection with the 2015 execution of Jordanian pilot Muath al-Kasasbeh in Syria. Although Krayem did not ignite the fire that killed al-Kasasbeh, the court ruled that his presence at the scene—armed, in uniform, and actively participating in forcing the victim into the cage—meant he had contributed directly to the murder. He was sentenced to life imprisonment.

== See also ==
- Brussels ISIL terror cell
