= Ajdir, Taza =

Coordinates: 35.0228°N 4.14083°W

Ajdir أجدير
- Town
- Interactive map of Ajdir
- Country: Morocco
- Region: Fès-Meknès
- Province: Taza Province

Population
  - Total: 10.214
- Time zone: UTC+0 (GMT)

Ajdir, Taza is a town in Taza Province, Fès-Meknès, Morocco.
