= Paris attacks trial =

Trial of the Paris attacks of 13 November 2015

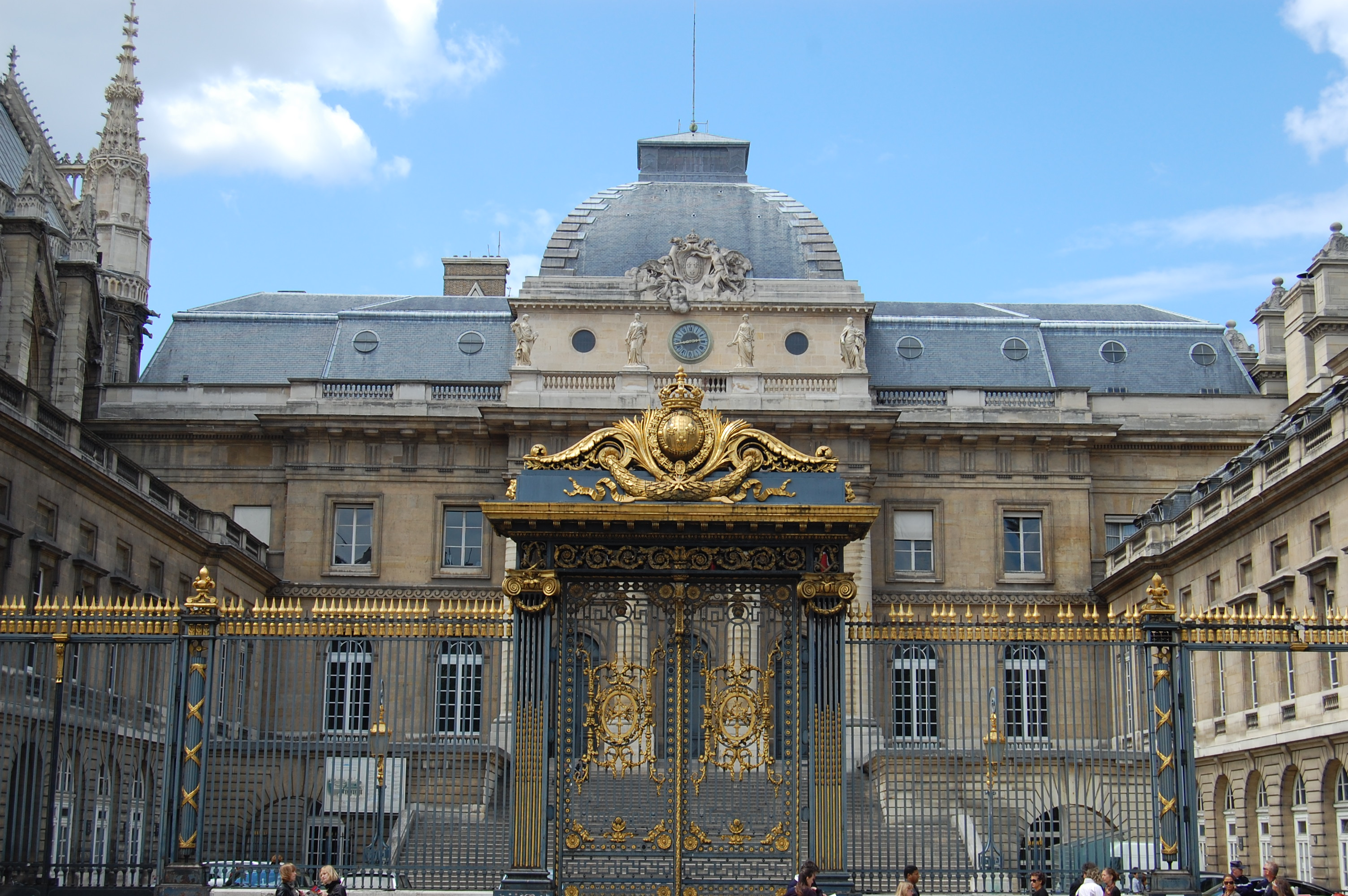
- Court: Palais de Justice, Paris
- Started: 8 September 2021
- Decided: 29 June 2022

Court membership
- Judges sitting: Jean-Louis Périès and four others

The Paris attacks trial (French: procès des attentats du 13 novembre 2015) was the trial in Paris, France, of twenty men accused of involvement in the Paris terrorist attacks of 13 November 2015, which killed 130 people and injured hundreds. The ten-month trial was the longest criminal trial in French history and took place in a specially built courtroom inside the Palais de Justice before five judges presided over by Jean-Louis Périès. The court sat for 148 days between 8 September 2021 and 27 June 2022. Verdicts were delivered on 29 June 2022. Nineteen of the twenty defendants were found guilty of all charges and sentenced to prison terms ranging from four years to full-life. One defendant was found guilty of fraud but not terrorist involvement and sentenced to two years imprisonment. In France the trial is also known as V13 as the attacks took place on Friday (French: vendredi) the 13th.

== Background ==
On the evening of 13 November 2015, a series of coordinated attacks were carried out by Islamist terrorists in Paris. Three terrorists detonated suicide bombs outside the Stade de France in Saint-Denis, killing one person. Another three terrorists drove through the 10th and 11th arrondissements (districts) of Paris, stopping at three junctions to open fire upon people on café and restaurant terraces, killing 39 people. One of the gunmen then detonated a suicide vest in a café in the 11th arrondissement. A third group of three terrorists carried out an attack on the Bataclan theatre, where the Eagles of Death Metal were playing to a packed audience of about 1,500. Ninety people were killed by gunfire. The final death toll of the attacks was 130.

Seven of the terrorists who carried out the attacks died on 13 November 2015 and two were killed during a police raid in Saint Denis on 18 November 2015. One terrorist survived. Salah Abdeslam had driven three suicide bombers to the Stade de France before abandoning his own suicide vest in a bin in a Paris suburb. He then called friends to collect him and drive him back to Brussels, where he went into hiding. He was arrested on 18 March 2016 in the Molenbeek district of Brussels.

The preparations for the attacks had taken place in Belgium. Two of the terrorists had Belgian nationality, six had French nationality (with three of them living in Belgium), and two were from Iraq.

On 29 November 2019, after a four-year investigation, the French national anti-terrorism prosecutor's office (PNAT) charged 14 people in relation to the attacks and issued a further six arrest warrants.

== Courtroom ==
The trial took place in a specially constructed courtroom inside the Palais de Justice on the Île de la Cité, an island in the River Seine in central Paris. The temporary courtroom was designed to accommodate 500 people, on account of the large number of civil parties (French: parties civiles), including the bereaved and survivors of the attacks. Over 1,800 people had been constituted civil parties by September 2021, although not all attended the trial. There were additional live-feed rooms available for journalists and members of the public. The trial was filmed for the judicial archives and a web-radio was available for civil parties to listen to the proceedings without attending the court. Apart from these recordings, no sound or image was allowed to leave the courtroom. Built at a cost of 7 million euros, the courtroom would later be used for the Nice lorry attack trial.

The court sat on Tuesdays to Fridays, with occasional Mondays, starting at 12.30 pm each day. The case file ran to more than a million pages in 542 volumes. More than 300 witnesses were due to be heard. The trial was scheduled to finish at the end of May, but this date had to be put back on several occasions due to cases of COVID amongst the defendants.

The initial budget for the trial was over 60 million euros, with the largest cost being legal aid fees for the lawyers of the civil parties. (Note: In France all victims of terrorism are eligible for legal aid.)

In France the trial is also known as V13 as the attacks took place on Friday (French: vendredi) the 13th.

== Judges, prosecutors and lawyers ==
The trial took place before a specially composed criminal court (French: la Cour d’assises spécialement composée) consisting of a panel of five judges, as French terrorist cases are not tried by juries. The five judges were presided over by Jean-Louis Périès, with Frédérique Aline as the first of the assistant judges (French: assesseures). There was in addition a reserve panel of four judges who followed the proceedings and were ready to take part if the need arose. The prosecution comprised three attorneys general from PNAT, Camille Hennetier, Nicolas Le Bris and Nicolas Braconnay.

About 330 lawyers took part in the trial. Each of the fourteen accused present was represented by at least two lawyers, given the length of the trial and the gravity of the charges. Abdeslam, the only surviving member of the 10 man cell that carried out the attacks, was defended by Olivia Ronen and Martin Vettes. Xavier Nogueras, a specialist in the defence of terrorists, and Christian Saint-Palais, the president of the association of criminal lawyers, were also on the defence team. The civil parties were represented by about 300 lawyers. Three lawyers, Gérard Chemla, Frédéric Bibal, and Jean Reinhart, who lost a nephew in the Bataclan, represented more than 100 civil parties each.

== The accused ==
Fourteen accused were present in the court, with a further six being tried in their absence. Eleven of the fourteen were detained and appeared heavily guarded in a glass box. The other three had been released from prison and sat on folding seats outside the box. Of those being tried in their absence, one was serving a prison term in Turkey for terrorist offences while the other five were assumed dead in Syria, but were still put on trial as there was no official confirmation of their deaths.

The eleven appearing in the box were: Abdeslam, Mohamed Abrini, Osama Krayem, Sofian Ayari, Mohamed Bakkali, Yassine Atar, Mohammed Amri, Ali El Haddad Asufi, Farid Kharkhach, Adel Haddadi and Muhamed Usman. Sitting outside the box were: Hamza Attou, Abdellah Chouaa and Ali Oulkadi. Tried in their absence were Ahmed Dahmani, who was serving a prison sentence in Turkey, and five others who were believed dead in Syria (Jean-Michel and Fabien Clain, Oussama Atar, Obeida Aref Dibo and Omar Darif).

Abdeslam was the only defendant who had taken part in the attacks on 13 November 2015. The others were charged with having been involved in the planning of the attacks, having provided logistical support to the terrorists or having assisted Abdeslam after the attacks.

== Course of the trial ==
The trial opened on Wednesday 8 September 2021. The accused were asked to confirm their personal details and Abdeslam made an angry outburst from the box, saying that he gave up all professions to become a warrior of the Islamic State. Preliminaries completed, on the third day the president of the court read out his report summarising the charges against the accused. The events of 13 November 2015 were described, and the names of the dead at each location were read out.

During the second and third weeks of the trial the court heard evidence from scenes-of-crime investigators and the Belgian investigating judge Isabelle Panou. On 22 September one of the first two police officers to enter the Bataclan theatre gave evidence. The commissioner from the anti-criminal brigade (French: brigade anti-criminalité, BAC) described how he and his driver had arrived at the theatre about ten minutes after the shooting started, entered the theatre and shot one of the terrorists, before retreating under fire from the other two gunmen. On 24 September it was the turn of the director of the Medico-legal Institute to give evidence.

From 28 September for five weeks, testimony was heard from the bereaved and survivors of the attacks, around 350 in all.

At the beginning of November, the accused were questioned for the first time, but only about their backgrounds and childhoods. Questions about their radicalisation or about the actual charges were reserved for later dates.

The following week, the court sat on only two days, taking a break Thursday and Friday 11–12 November for Armistice Day and for the day preceding the seventh annual commemoration of the Paris attacks. On Tuesday 9 November, evidence was heard from two investigators from the General Directorate for Internal Security (French: Direction générale de la sécurité intérieure, DGSI). On Wednesday 10 November, François Hollande, who had been President of France at the time of the attacks, testified before the court.

On Tuesday 16 November, the court heard testimony from Hugo Micheron, a writer on jihadism, and the former heads of the internal and external security directorates. On Wednesday it was the turn of former prime-minister Bernard Cazeneuve and public prosecutor François Molins. The rest of the week, and the following two and a half weeks, testimony was heard from investigators from the DGSI, Belgian investigators and an Austrian investigator. From Thursday 9 December for five days, the court started to hear testimony from relatives and friends of the accused and also of the terrorists who had carried out the attacks. On 17 December, the final day before the end of year break, the former head of DGSI, Patrick Calvar, appeared before the court.

The end of year break was prolonged by a week due to a case of COVID amongst the accused and the court reconvened on 11 January 2022. For four days the accused were cross-examined on their radicalisation and on events up to August 2015, before the court was again suspended for a week due to more cases of COVID in the box. There followed a further three weeks of cross-examination of the accused. On 9 February Abdeslam, who had maintained his right to silence since his arrest six years earlier, spoke for the first time about his role in the attacks, saying that he had never killed or injured anyone. The court was suspended for two weeks from 15 February to 1 March, again due to cases of COVID amongst the accused, and then heard evidence from Belgian investigators concerning the properties used as hide-outs by the terrorists. From 10 March for ten days the accused were cross-examined over the final preparations for the attacks. On 28 March the court reached its 100th day of hearings and turned to the arrival in Paris of the terrorists on 12 November 2015 and the attacks themselves.

On 30 March Abdeslam refused to answer questions about the evening of 13 November 2015, having previously claimed that he had backed out of detonating his suicide vest at the last minute. An explosives expert testified that the suicide vest had been in a non-functioning state when found in a rubbish bin a week after the attacks, casting doubt on Abdeslam's claims. On 1 April, at the request of the victims' association Life for Paris and after a debate the previous day, the court was shown photographs of the Bataclan and heard extracts from a sound recording of the attack. (Note: An audience member had been recording the concert; the device was found on the floor, having recorded the duration of the attack.)

The following week the court heard evidence about Abdeslam's escape from Paris and about the co-ordination of the attacks from Brussels. On 8 April, the court heard the anonymous testimony of "Sonia", who had denounced Abdelhamid Abaaoud following the attacks.

On 12 April, Abdeslam broke his silence to give his version of his role in the attacks and the next three days were taken up with his cross-examination. Abdeslam claimed he had gone into a bar in the 18th arrondissement with the intention of detonating his suicide vest but had changed his mind at the last minute, out of humanity. The court then, from 20 to 22 April, heard three days' of evidence from psychiatrists and psychologists who had examined some of those accused. There was a week's break for the spring holidays, before the court heard evidence from sociologist Bernard Rougier, writer Mohamed Sifaoui and the former antiterrorist judge Marc Trévidic. There were then a further five days of testimony from civil parties, interrupted for a week by another case of COVID in the box.

The trial entered its final stages on 23 May with nine days of closing speeches by lawyers for the civil parties. Some of the lawyers collaborated to speak on themes, while others spoke for the victims they represented. The three prosecutors then had three days to make their closing speeches, summing up the evidence and recommending sentences. The defence lawyers made their closing speeches over the next ten days, with, on Friday 24 June, the final word being given to the lawyers of Abdeslam.

On Monday 27 June, the 148th and last day of the trial, the court, convening for the only time in the morning, heard final statements from the accused. The judges then retired to a secret location to consider their verdicts, scheduled to be delivered on the evening of Wednesday 29 June.

== Verdicts ==
The verdicts were announced on the evening of 29 June 2022. Nineteen of the twenty men standing trial were found guilty on all charges. The twentieth, Kharkhach, was found not guilty of terrorist charges but guilty of lesser fraud charges and sentenced to two years in prison. Abdeslam was sentenced to a full-life term, which will give him a chance of parole after 30 years. The others received sentences of between four years and life in prison.

There were no appeals from either the convicted or the prosecution.
