= Brussels Islamic State terror cell =

Group who carried out terrorist attacks

- Years active: 2014–2016
- Territory: Brussels, Belgium
- Activities: Terrorist attacks in Paris and Brussels
- Notable members: Abdelhamid Abaaoud; Salah Abdeslam; Osama Krayem

The Brussels Islamic State terror cell was a sleeper cell of the Islamic State (IS), an Islamic jihadist terrorist organisation primarily based in Syria and Iraq. The IS sub-group was involved in large-scale attacks in Paris in November 2015, in which 130 people were killed, and Brussels in March 2016, in which 32 people were killed.

== Background ==
On 13 November 2015, a group of ten IS terrorists carried out a series of coordinated attacks across the French capital, Paris; 130 people were killed in the attacks. Seven of the terrorists died during the attacks; two of the remaining three were tracked down five days later and killed in the 2015 Saint-Denis raid along with the woman who had provided them with a hideout. The tenth attacker failed to detonate his suicide vest and returned to the Belgian capital, Brussels.

The police manhunt for the tenth attacker and further accomplices led them to Brussels. Between 21 and 25 November, the city was placed in lockdown due to the threat of another terrorist attack. On 15 March 2016, the police raided a flat in the Brussels district of Forest, killing one terrorist whilst two others escaped. The two who escaped were arrested three days later on 18 March in the Molenbeek district of Brussels. A second major attack then took place on 22 March in Brussels in which coordinated bombings at the airport and at a metro station killed 32 people. Three suicide bombers died, while another two fled without detonating their explosives.

In June 2022, after a ten-month trial in Paris, a total of 19 men were convicted of being involved in the terror cell that planned and carried out the Paris attacks, with a twentieth man convicted of criminal but not terrorist offences.

In July 2023, after a seven-month trial in Brussels, six men were convicted of terrorist murder and attempted murder in relation to the Brussels attacks. Another two were cleared of terrorist murder and attempted murder but convicted of terrorist activity, while two were cleared of all charges.

== 2015 Paris attackers ==
Three teams, comprising one team of four people and two teams of three people each, carried out the November 2015 Paris attacks. Seven attackers died at the scenes of their attacks. Two of the attackers were killed five days later during the Saint-Denis police raid, while Salah Abdeslam returned to Brussels.

=== Stade de France attackers ===
Three suicide bombers blew themselves up near the Stade de France:

==== Bilal Hadfi ====
Hadfi was a 20-year-old French national of Moroccan descent who had been living in Belgium. He attempted to enter the Stade de France but blew himself up nearby after being denied entry. He had gone to Syria in early 2015 and his name was on a list of 800 suspected Belgian jihadists. Belgian authorities were unaware of his return to Europe.

==== "Ahmad Almohammad" ====
Another of the Stade de France bombers carried a fake Syrian passport with the name "Ahmad Almohammad". His fingerprints matched those of a man registered as a Syrian refugee under the same name on the island of Leros in October 2015 upon his arrival from Turkey. In January 2016, the IS online magazine Dabiq identified him as an Iraqi national. In January 2017 a declassified French intelligence file identified the bomber as Ammar Ramadan Mansour Mohamad al-Sabaawi, an Iraqi in his twenties from Mosul. IS paid al-Sabaawi's family $5,000 and a flock of sheep after his death.

==== "M. al-Mahmod" ====
The third Stade de France bomber was an Iraqi national. He travelled together with "Ahmad al-Mohammad" and used a fake Syrian passport with the name of "M. al Mahmod".

==== Salah Abdeslam ====
Abdeslam drove the three Stade de France bombers to the football stadium. He was then supposed to detonate his own suicide vest in the 18th arrondissement (district) of Paris but the device malfunctioned and he returned to Brussels the following morning.

Abdeslam (born 15 September 1989) is a Belgian-born French national of Moroccan descent. He grew up in the Brussels district of Molenbeek, where he was involved in petty crime and drug dealing. During the summer and autumn of 2015 he participated in preparations for the Paris and Brussels attacks. He picked up members of the group returning from Syria via the migrant route in Germany and Hungary and drove them to Brussels. He hired two of the cars used in the Paris attacks and bought material for making explosives. After four months hiding in Brussels, Abdeslam was arrested on 18 March 2016 in Molenbeek. Three days earlier he had escaped from a hideout in the Forest district of Brussels during a police shootout.

In April 2018, Abdeslam was sentenced to 20 years in prison for his part in the Forest shoot-out. In June 2022, at the Paris attacks trial he was sentenced to a full-life term in prison. In December 2022 he went on trial in Brussels for his involvement in the Brussels attacks. Verdicts were delivered on 25 July 2023; Abdeslam was convicted of terrorist-related murder and attempted murder. He was not given a sentence as he had already been sentenced for a connected crime (the Forest shoot-out).

=== Paris restaurant attackers ===
Three men carried out the shootings at bars and restaurants in Paris:

==== Abdelhamid Abaaoud ====
Abaaoud (8 April 1987 – 18 November 2015), was a Belgian of Moroccan descent who had grown up in Molenbeek. He had been a childhood friend of Salah Abdeslam and had a criminal record. He joined IS forces in Syria and on his return to Europe had directed the Verviers terrorist cell from Athens in Greece. In July 2015, he was sentenced by a Belgian court in absentia to 20 years in prison for recruiting jihadists, and an international arrest warrant was issued for him. The ringleader of the Paris attacks, he also had involvement in the planning of other terrorist attacks in France and Belgium.

Abaaoud was one of the three gunmen who drove through the 10th and 11th arrondissements of Paris, stopping at three junctions to open fire upon people on café and restaurant terraces. While one gunman then detonated his suicide vest, Abaaoud and the third gunman abandoned their car and went into hiding. They were killed in a police raid on a flat in Saint-Denis on 18 November 2015, while planning a further attack on Paris. Also killed in the raid was Abaaoud's cousin Hasna Aït Boulahcen, who had provided them with the hideout.

==== Ibrahim Abdeslam ====
Ibrahim Abdeslam (born 1984) was the older brother of Salah Abdeslam. He grew up in Molenbeek, was involved in petty crime and ran a café-bar, Café Les Béguines, which was a centre for drug dealing and Islamic State propaganda. After a failed attempt to reach Syria, he was questioned by local police but was not arrested.

After shooting people in cafés and restaurants in the 10th and 11th arrondissements, he blew himself up at the Comptoir Voltaire restaurant on the boulevard Voltaire.

==== Chakib Akrouh ====
Akrouh (born 1990) was a Belgian national of Moroccan descent. He had travelled to Syria in 2013 and had been sentenced in absentia to five years in prison while he was there.

Akrouh was one of the restaurant gunmen and blew himself up using a suicide vest during the police raid on the flat in Saint-Denis five days later. It took police two months to identify him using DNA samples.

=== Bataclan theatre attackers ===
Three gunmen wearing suicide vests attacked the Bataclan theatre on 13 November 2015 using AKMs and taking hostages. All three were French nationals who had travelled to Syria in 2013 and returned to Europe via the migrant route, being picked up in Hungary in September 2015 by Salah Abdeslam and driven to Brussels, where they stayed in the terrorist cell hideouts until driving to Paris on 12 November. They were all killed when police raided the Bataclan.

==== Samy Amimour ====
Amimour was a 28-year-old French national of Algerian descent from the Paris suburb of Drancy. He was followed by the intelligence services after making plans to travel to Yemen and was the subject of an international arrest warrant. He was shot by two police officers who entered the Bataclan about ten minutes after the attack started. His suicide vest was detonated as he fell.

==== Omar Ismail Mostefaï ====
Mostefai was a 29-year-old French national of Algerian and Portuguese descent who grew up in the Paris suburb of Courcouronnes. He had been involved with petty crime and was on a list of suspected Islamic radicals. He was killed with Mohamed-Aggad during the final police assault on the Bataclan.

==== Foued Mohamed-Aggad ====
Mohamed-Aggad was a 23-year-old French national of Moroccan and Algerian descent from Wissembourg. He was killed with Mostefaï during the final police assault on the Bataclan.

== 2016 Brussels attackers ==
On 22 March 2016 there were co-ordinated attacks on Brussels Airport at Zaventem and on a train leaving Maalbeek/Maelbeek metro station in central Brussels.

=== Airport bombers ===
Two suicide bombers detonated bombs in the departure hall of the airport, while a third fled without detonating his bomb.

==== Ibrahim El Bakraoui ====
Ibrahim El Bakraoui (9 October 1986 – 22 March 2016) was a Belgian-Moroccan national who grew up in the Laeken district of Brussels. He had a criminal record and had served time in prison for injuring a police officer during an armed robbery in 2010.

==== Najim Laachraoui ====
Laachraoui (18 May 1991 – 22 March 2016) was a Belgian-Moroccan national who grew up in the Schaerbeek district of Brussels. He travelled to Syria in 2013 and on his return was collected by Salah Adbdeslam in Hungary and taken to hideouts in Brussels, where he fabricated the suicide vests used in the Paris attacks and the bombs used in the Brussels attacks. He was the second bomber at the airport.

==== Mohamed Abrini ====
Abrini (born 27 December 1984) is a Belgian national of Moroccan descent who grew up in Molenbeek and was a childhood friend of Salah Abdeslam. He had a long criminal record, had spent time in prison and had briefly travelled to Syria in 2015. He was involved in the planning of the Paris attacks and had accompanied the ten attackers to Paris on 12 November 2015, before returning to Brussels later that night and going into hiding. Arrested 8 April 2016, he admitted to being the "man in a hat" who had been captured on CCTV at the airport alongside the suicide bombers and had fled without detonating his bomb.

In June 2023, at the Paris attacks trial, Abrini was sentenced to life imprisonment with a minimum term of 22 years. In December 2022 he went on trial in Brussels for his role in the bombings. Verdicts were delivered on 25 July 2023; Abrini was convicted of terrorist-related murder and attempted murder. He was given a 30-year prison sentence.

=== Metro bombers ===
Just over an hour after the airport bombing, a suicide bomber detonated a bomb on a train leaving Maelbeek metro station. Another bomber fled without detonating his bomb.

==== Khalid El Bakraoui ====
Khalid El Bakraoui (12 January 1989 – 22 March 2016) was a Belgian-Moroccan national and the younger brother of Ibrahim El Bakraoui. Like his brother, he had been involved in violent crime and had spent time in prison. He carried out the attack on a train leaving Maelbeek metro station during the Brussels bombings.

==== Osama Krayem ====
Krayem (born 1992) is a Swedish national of Palestinian descent who travelled to Syria. On his return to Europe he was collected from Ulm in Germany by Salah Abdeslam and was then involved in preparations for the Paris attacks. On 13 November 2015, he went to Amsterdam Airport Schiphol with Sofien Ayari, but no attack was carried out. Krayem was the second bomber at Maelbeek metro station, having been filmed with Khalid El Bakraoui at another metro station minutes before the attack, but he left the metro without detonating his bomb. He was arrested on 8 April 2016.

In June 2023, at the Paris attacks trial, Krayem was sentenced to 30 years imprisonment. In December 2022 he went on trial in Brussels for his role in the bombings. Verdicts were delivered on 25 July 2023; Krayem was convicted of terrorist-related murder and attempted murder. He was given a life sentence.

== Other members of the cell ==
=== Of Belgian nationality ===
==== Hamza Attou, Mohamed Amri and Ali Oulkadi ====
Attou, Amri and Oulkadi were three friends of Salah Abdeslam who were convicted of terrorist offences in Paris in June 2022. Attou and Amri drove Abdeslam back to Brussels from Paris on the morning after the attacks, while Oulkadi met him in Brussels and took him to a hideout. They received prison sentences of four, eight and five years respectively at the Paris attacks trial in June 2022.

==== Mohamed Bakkali ====
Bakkali (born 1987) is a Belgian of Moroccan descent. In December 2020 he was sentenced to 25 years in prison for complicity in the 2015 Thalys train attack (a sentence which, as of 2022, was under appeal). In June 2022 at the Paris attacks trial he was sentenced to 30 years in prison for his role in planning the attacks.

==== Oussama & Yassine Atar ====
Oussama Atar (born 1984) grew up in Laeken, Brussels. He was a cousin of the El Bakraoui brothers. He first traveled to Syria from Belgium in 2002 and then went back in 2004 before travelling to Iraq, where he was arrested for crossing the border illegally and jailed for 10 years in 2005. He was imprisoned in the Abu Ghraib prison, run by US forces. He returned to Belgium in 2012 after a campaign for his release but 7 years in jail had left him radicalized. He then returned to Syria and, under the name of Abou Ahmad, organised the Paris and Brussels attacks from Raqqa.

Atar was killed by an airstrike in Syria in November 2017. As there is no official confirmation of his death, he was tried in absentia for both the Paris and Brussels attacks. In Paris in June 2022 he was convicted of organising the attacks and was sentenced to a full-life term in prison. In Brussels in July 2023 he was convicted of terrorist murder and attempted murder for his role in planning the attacks. He was given a life sentence. In March 2025, after a trial in Paris, Atar was convicted in absentia of the kidnapping and torturing of four French journalist in Syria between 2013 and 2014. He received another life sentence.

Yassine Atar is the younger brother of Oussama Atar. In June 2022 in Paris he was sentenced to 8 years in prison for complicity in the Paris attacks.

==== Ali El Haddad Asufi ====
El Haddad Asufi (born 1984 in Berchem-Sainte-Agathe, Brussels), an airport worker, was a schoolfriend of Ibrahim El Bakraoui and drove him to and from airports when he was attempting to reach Syria. At the Paris attacks trial in June 2022 he was convicted of obtaining guns for the Paris attackers in October 2015 and sentenced to 10 years in prison. In December 2022, he went on trial in Brussels for involvement in the Brussels bombings. Verdicts were delivered on 25 July 2023; El Haddad Asufi was convicted of terrorist-related murder and attempted murder. He was sentenced to 20 years in prison.

==== Abdellah Chouaa ====
Chouaa (born 1981) is a Belgian-Moroccan who was a friend of Abrini and drove him to the airport when he departed to Syria in June 2015, sent him money in Turkey, and collected him from a Paris airport upon his return in July 2015. He was sentenced to four years in prison at the Paris attacks trial in June 2022.

==== Ahmed Dahmani ====
Dahmani (born 1989) is a Belgian-Moroccan from Molenbeek who was a friend of Abdeslam and took part in preparations for the Paris attacks. The day after the attacks he fled to Turkey, where he was arrested and charged with belonging to a terrorist organisation and possession of false documents. He was sentenced to eight years in prison in Turkey. In Paris he was tried in absentia, as the Turkish authorities refused to extradite him, and sentenced to 30 years in prison.

==== Bilal El Makhoukhi ====
El Makhoukhi (born 1989) is a Belgian-Moroccan who grew up in Laeken. In 2012 he left to fight in Syria. Wounded in the legs, he was repatriated to Belgium for hospital treatment. In 2015 was convicted of belonging to Sharia4Belgium, a group in Antwerp that recruited men to fight in Syria. He received a five-year sentence, with three years suspended, which he was serving at home with an electronic tag when was arrested on 8 April 2016 in Laeken. In December 2022 he went on trial in Brussels for his role in the bombings. Verdicts were delivered on 25 July 2023; El Makhoukhi was convicted of terrorist-related murder and attempted murder. He was given a life sentence.

=== Of other nationalities ===
==== Sofien Ayari ====
Ayari (born 1993) is a Tunisian who left for Syria in 2014. He travelled to Brussels with Krayem and took part in preparations for the Paris attacks. On 13 November 2015 he accompanied Krayem to Schiphol airport. He was arrested together with Abdeslam on 18 March 2016 in Molenbeek. In 2018 he went on trial for his part in the Forest shootout and was sentenced to 20 years in prison for the attempted murder of police officers in a terrorist context.

In June 2023, at the Paris attacks trial, Ayari was sentenced to 30 years imprisonment. In December 2022 he went on trial in Brussels for his role in the bombings. Verdicts were delivered on 25 July 2023; Ayari was cleared of terrorist-related murder and attempted murder but convicted of taking part in terrorist activities. He did not receive a sentence as he had already been sentenced for a connected crime (the Forest shoot-out).

==== Mohamed Belkaid ====
Belkaid (born 1980), known by his nom de guerre Abu Abdulaziz al Jazairi, was an Algerian national who had been in Syria and was collected, together with Laachroui, from Hungary by Salah Abdeslam in September 2015. Together with Laachraoui, he was co-ordinating the Paris attacks from Brussels on 13 November 2015 and then contacted Aït Boulahcen in order to find a hideout for Abaaoud and Akrouh after the attacks. Belkaid was killed by a police sniper during the raid on a flat in Forest on 15 March 2016. He had stayed in the flat and fired at police officers while Abdeslam and Ayari escaped from a back window.

==== Muhammed Usman and Adel Haddadi ====
From Pakistan and Algeria respectively, Usman and Haddadi (born 1987) had been recruited in Syria for the Paris attacks. They had left Syria with the Iraqi Stade de France bombers, but had been delayed in Greece when they were detained for having fake Syrian passports and never reached Brussels. Greek police released them and they were arrested in an Austrian migrant camp in December 2015 and extradited to France. They were both sentenced to 20 years in prison at the Paris attacks trial in June 2022.

==== Omar Darif ====
Darif (born 1992) was a Syrian who was involved in the making of suicide vests in Brussels before returning to Syria, where he was killed in July 2017. As there was no official confirmation of his death, he was tried in absentia at the Paris attacks trial and sentenced to a full-life term in prison.

==== Obeida Aref Dibo ====
Dibo (born 1993) was a Syrian who was involved in organising the Paris attacks from Syria. Thought to have been killed in Syria in February 2016, he was tried in absentia at the Paris attacks trial and sentenced to a full-life term in prison.

==== Zakaria Boufassil and Mohammed Ali Ahmed ====
In July 2015, months before the Paris terror attacks, two men named Zakaria Boufassil and Mohammed Ali Ahmed met with Abrini, in a park in Birmingham, United Kingdom. They gave him £3,000 out of a bank account that was set up by another man who traveled to Syria to join IS. Most of the money had come from housing benefits. In December 2016, both men were found guilty of engaging in conduct in preparation for acts of terrorism.

== See also ==
- Islamic terrorism
- Hamburg cell
