= Maelbeek metro station =

Metro station in Brussels, Belgium

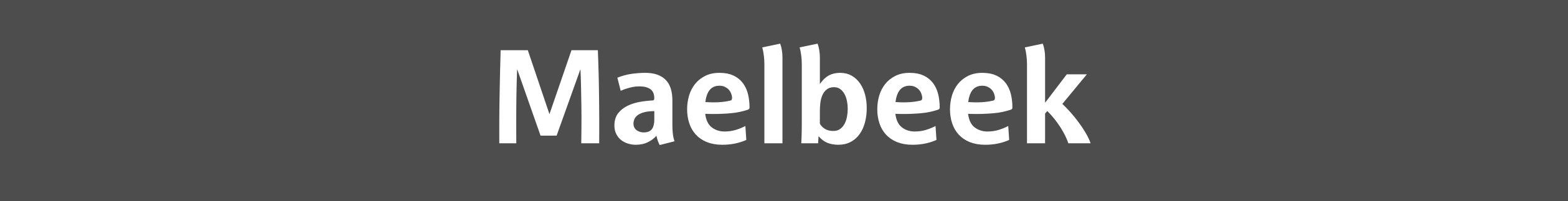
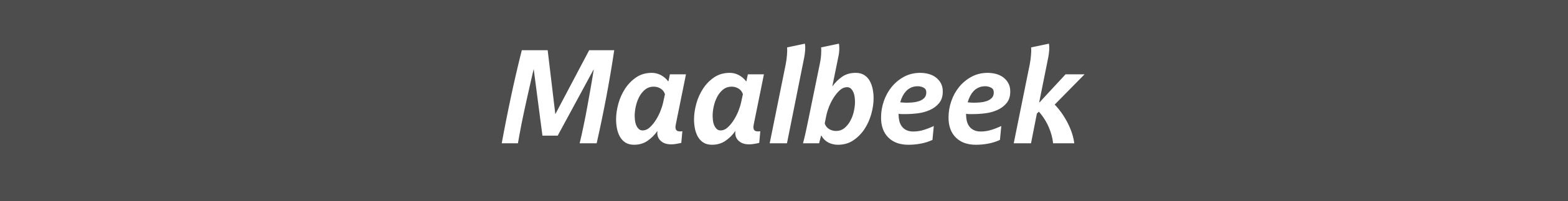

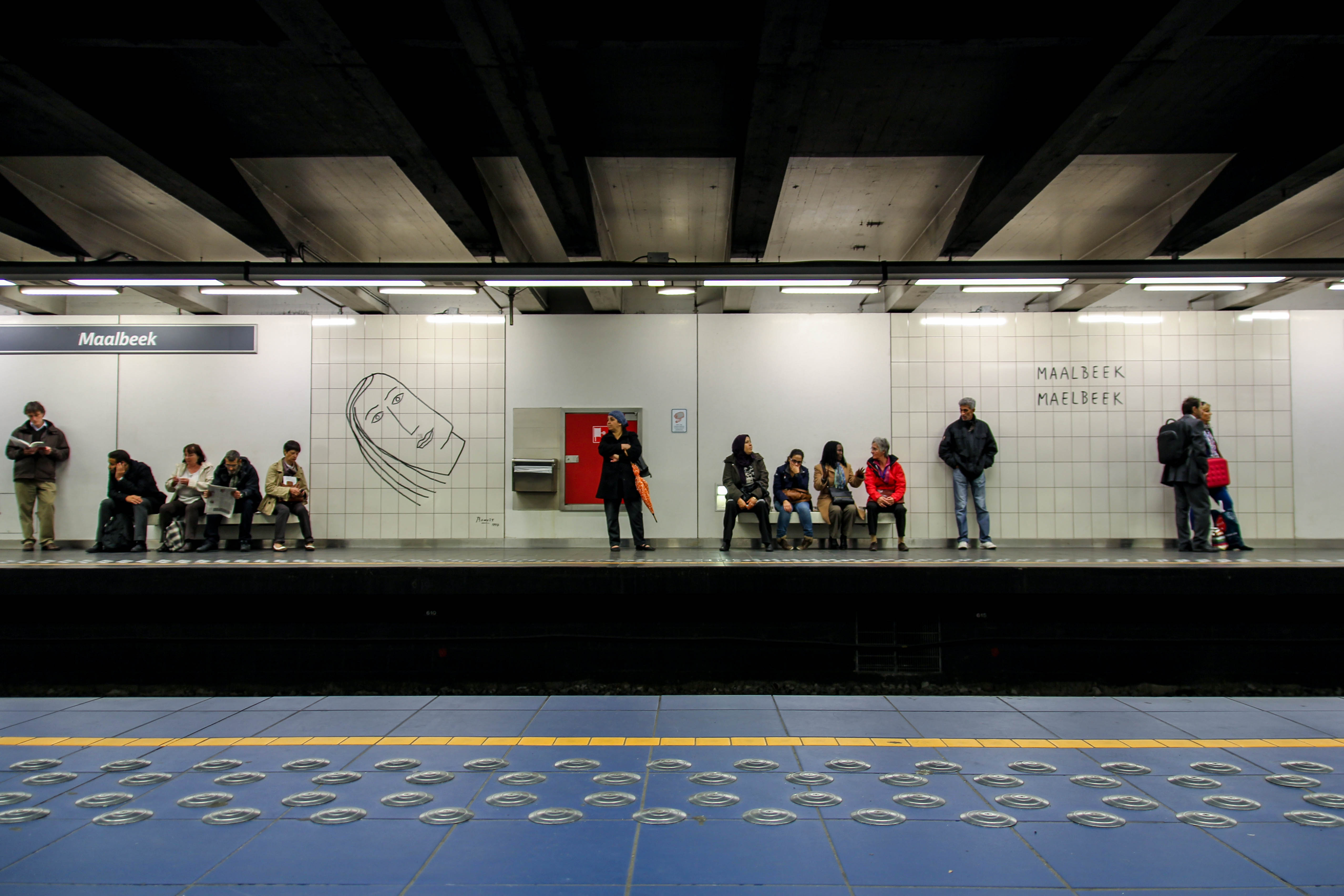
- Maelbeek/Maalbeek metro station

General information
- Location: Rue de la Loi / Wetstraat; 1000 City of Brussels, Brussels-Capital Region, Belgium
- Coordinates: 50°50′38″N 4°22′36″E
- Owner: STIB/MIVB
- Platforms: 2
- Tracks: 2

Construction
- Structure type: Underground

History
- Opened: 17 December 1969; 56 years ago (premetro); 20 September 1976; 50 years ago (metro)

Services
| Preceding station | Brussels Metro | Following station |
|---|---|---|
| Arts-Loi/Kunst-Wet towards Gare de l'Ouest/Weststation | Line 1 | Schuman towards Stockel/Stokkel |
| Arts-Loi/Kunst-Wet towards Erasme/Erasmus | Line 5 | Schuman towards Herrmann-Debroux |
Location

Maelbeek (French, pronounced [malbek, -bɛk]; former Dutch spelling) or Maalbeek (modern Dutch, pronounced [ˈmaːlbeːk]) is a Brussels Metro station on lines 1 and 5. It is located under the Rue de la Loi/Wetstraat in the City of Brussels, Belgium. The station takes its name from the nearby Maalbeek stream.

The station opened on 17 December 1969 as a premetro (underground tram) station on the tram line between De Brouckère and Schuman. This station was upgraded to full metro status on 20 September 1976, serving former east–west line 1 (further split in 1982 into former lines 1A and 1B). Then, following the reorganisation of the Brussels Metro on 4 April 2009, it now lies on the joint section of east–west lines 1 and 5.

== History ==
Maelbeek/Maalbeek station was inaugurated on 17 December 1969 as a premetro station (i.e. a station served by underground tramways), as part of the first underground public transport route in Belgium, which initially stretched from De Brouckère to Schuman. On 20 September 1976, this premetro line was converted into a heavy metro line, which was later split into two distinct lines on 6 October 1982: former lines 1A and 1B, both serving Maelbeek/Maalbeek. On 4 April 2009, metro operation was restructured and the station is now served by metro lines 1 and 5.

=== 2016 Brussels bombings ===
On 22 March 2016 at 09:11 CET, an explosion occurred at Maelbeek/Maalbeek station. The bomb exploded from the middle carriage of a three-carriage train as it began to leave the station and head towards Arts-Loi/Kunst-Wet. The Islamic State of Iraq and the Levant released a statement claiming responsibility for the attack and branding Belgium a participant in the ongoing military intervention against ISIL. The suicide attack took place about an hour after the bombings at Brussels Airport. The Dutch-language public broadcaster VRT reported that 20 people were killed at the metro station, with 106 injured.

The station was closed for over a month following the attacks. It reopened on 25 April 2016.

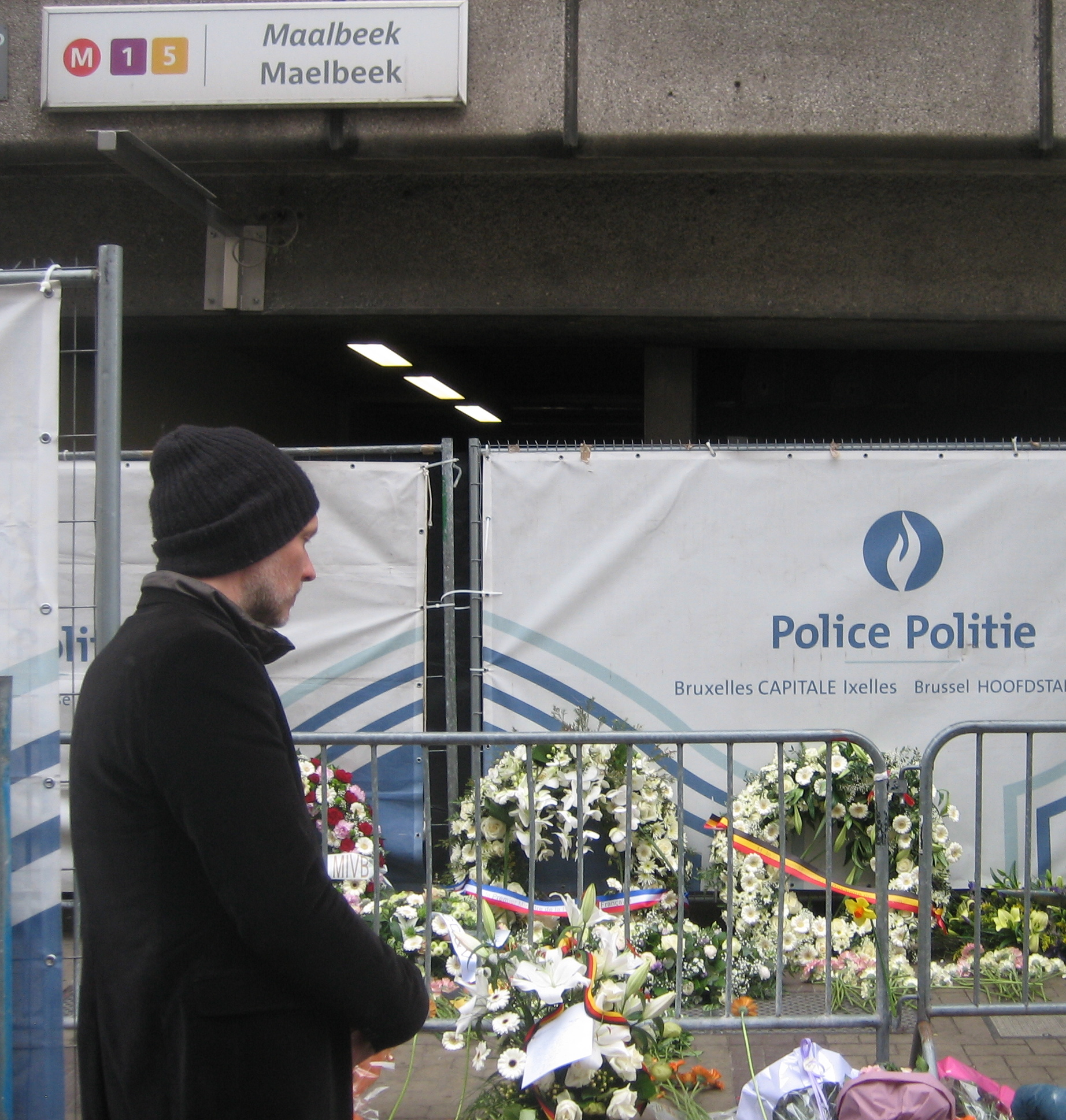
Maelbeek/Maalbeek metro entrance after the 2016 Brussels bombings

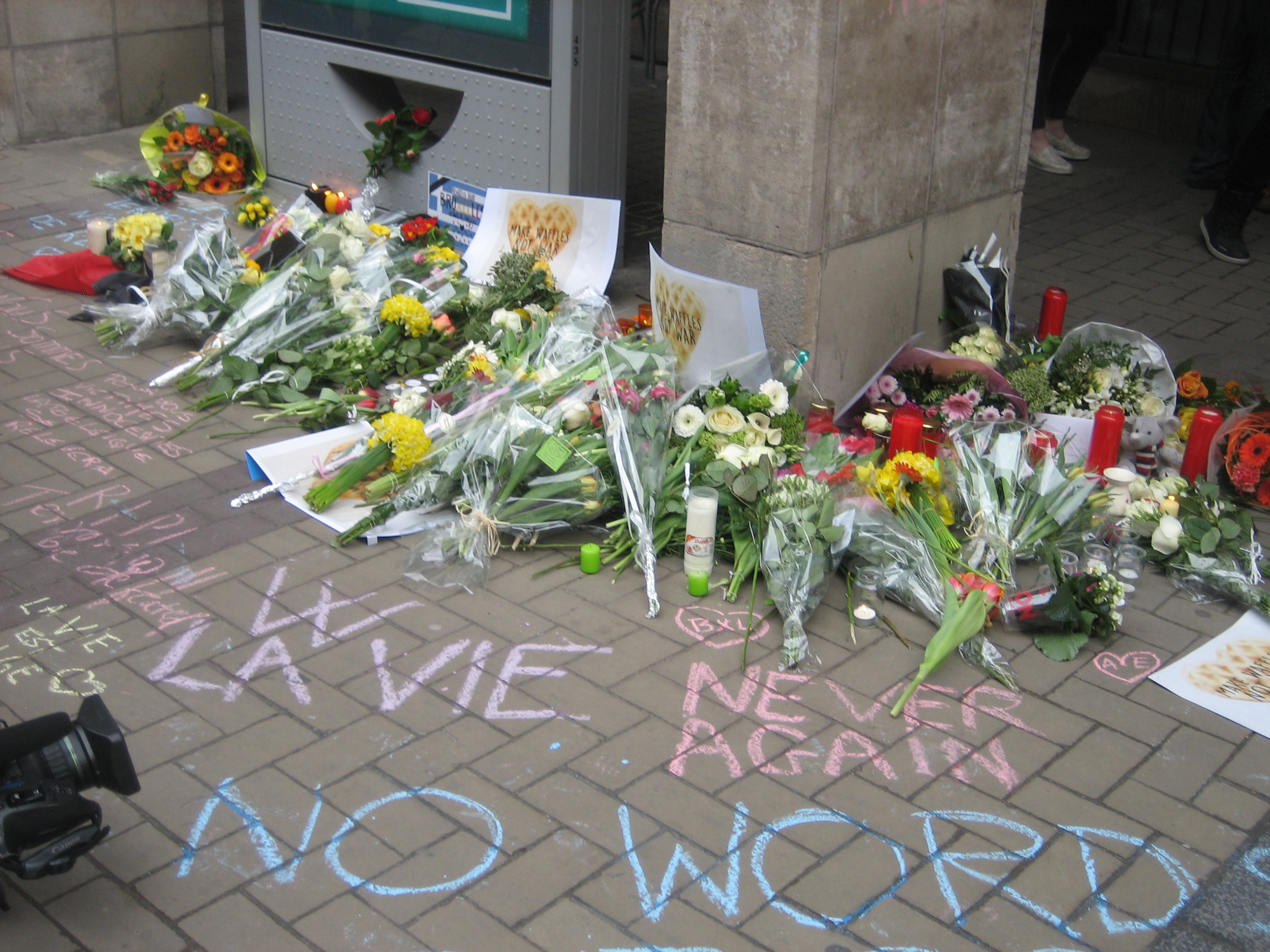
Flowers and inscriptions at the metro entrance

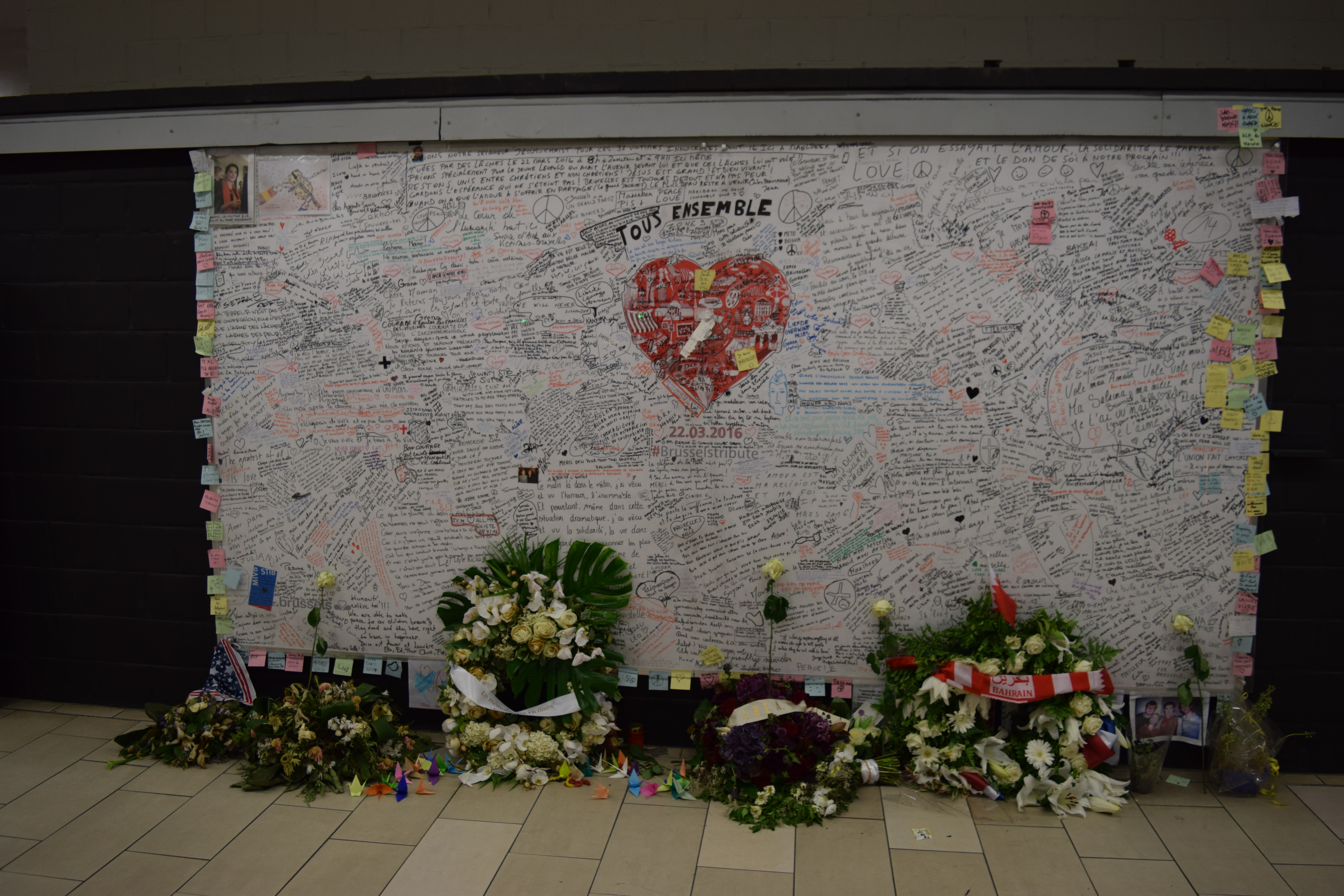
Temporary memorial wall in the station after the attacks

== Interior and art ==
The walls of the station's platforms are decorated with white Azulejo tiles manufactured in Portugal. During renovation works in 1999, the visual artist Benoît van Innis was commissioned to paint eight portraits on the walls. The 2016 Brussels bombings saw the destruction of his works in the station, which he replaced to pay homage to the victims. The work was inaugurated on 18 July 2016, containing an olive tree to symbolise peace and accompanied by a poem in Dutch, French, and the six languages of UNESCO.

== Location ==
The station is located under the Rue de la Loi/Wetstraat, a street best known for the many official buildings of the European Union (EU), including the European Parliament and the European Commission, as well as of the Belgian Federal Government. One of the station's exits leads to the Rue de la Loi, with a side entrance leading to the Rue Joseph II/Jozef II-straat. The other exit leads to the Chaussée d'Etterbeek/Etterbeeksesteenweg. It is located under the bridge carrying the Rue de la Loi. Nearby (also on the Chaussée d'Etterbeek) is an entrance leading to the SNCB/NMBS (heavy rail) southbound platforms of Schuman railway station. This entrance is located under the railway bridge with stairs up to the platforms.

== Area ==
Nearby landmarks include:

- Chapel of the Resurrection
- European Quarter
- European Parliament

== See also ==
- Transport in Brussels
- History of Brussels
