= The Rise of the Khilafah and the Return of the Gold Dinar =

- Banner ad for The Rise of the Khilafah and the Return of the Gold Dinar
- شروق الخلافة وعودة الدينار الذهبي
- Narrated by: Mohammed Khalifa
- Music by: Ajnad Media Foundation for Audio Production; Al-Hayat Media Center
- Production company: Al-Hayat Media Center
- Distributed by: Al-Hayat Media Center
- Release date: 30 August 2015 (Raqqa)
- Running time: 55 minutes
- Country: Syria
- Language: English

The Rise of the Khilafah and the Return of the Gold Dinar (Arabic: شروق الخلافة وعودة الدينار الذهبي, romanized: Shurūq al-khilāfah wa-ʻawdat al-dīnār al-Dhahabī) is a documentary-like film produced by Al-Hayat Media Center about the creation of the Islamic State Gold Dinar and the attempt to outdo the United States Dollar and the Pound sterling.

== History ==
Al-Hayat Media Center created a trailer for the film and released it on August 28, 2015, and spread it via Twitter (now X) and JustPaste.it. The film was officially released on August 30, 2015. The film also received an announcement of its release through the Al-Hayat Media Center produced magazine, Dabiq, through its 11th issue "From the Battles of Al-Ahzāb to the War of Coalitions" on September 9, 2015, days after the film was officially released.

== Film ==
The film starts by talking about the start of the caliphates started by Muhammed calling it the "legacy of the prophetic methodology" which then transitions into the "modern caliphate" of the Islamic State. It then starts talking about modern systems of currency and the Federal Reserve, stating that the latter was "sown by Americans and cultivated by Jews", and how it failed as a "capitalist financial system of enslavement" which started with the federal reserve bank note and imposed it upon the rest of the world, and then saying the September 11 attacks was the "first blow to a Satanic financial system" and called the World Trade Center towers the "twin idols of capitalism".

Afterwards, it talks about the establishment of the Islamic State as a "return of the prophetic methodology" and said it would return Sharia law and to "purify the earth of corruption" by establishing hajj, zakat, and jizya, with the ending establishment of the gold dinar to combat the use of U.S. dollars and capitalism. It then moves to talk about the people of Midian and how they received a divine punishment for their actions, and compared it to the modern day banknotes calling its conception "Satanic" for being created through banks and calling it a system of riba the Federal Reserve orchestrated.

This topic transitions into the history of the use of gold and silver, and how trade started in the ancient city of Babylon around the Tigris and Euphrates using items with intrinsic value like staple food commodities including dates and barley and how it was used to exchange products and services as a mean of currency because people needed food. The film later explains the inefficacies of using food to trade, like how food has a shelf life and how food couldn't really be used to buy larger items including housing, where portability became an issue same with storage and how delivery costs would cost more over distance. It's also brought up how when there's no standard medium of exchange where buying and selling could become troublesome, with an example being how someone might not accept dates as payment and how impractical it would be to keep food around to facilitate purchases. It then talks about how humans are naturally allured by gold and how it became the standard medium for exchange and it became more practical to use, like how gold is divisible, can be melted into items of jewelry and coinage, and did not corrode or lose value due to shelf life, it became a standard medium for exchange.

The film then places itself in the time of Joseph while in ancient Egypt and how he was sold into slavery, it then takes this story to talk about the use of silver and gold were turned into coins as a way to purchase items and how he was sold for a few silver coins. They then talk about the history of gold coins, and how in ancient China used square gold coins, how the Kingdom of Lydia used gold coins, how Athens also adopted gold coins in 600 BCE, how the Roman Empire began trading with gold coins in 60 BCE, and how in the Kingdom of Persia the silver dirhams. It then goes into the time of Muhammed's life in Medina, unity under tawhid and how Islam regulated finances but never altered the use of any coins in circulation and it became the standard Islamic medium of transaction, but how it forbid the use of interest and how "Allah declared war against interest", calling it a form of idolatry and injustice. The film later talks about rates of exchange under an ideal Islamic State, which did not impose interest or sales tax, created its own form of the gold dinar and measured it in various ways to protect the seller against fraud, especially debasement.

The film continued to talk about the Umayyad Caliphate and its expansion into Al-Andalus, comparing the situation of it to that of the European Dark Ages. This transitioned into the topic of how each of the European kingdoms had different coins, and how money exchange services charged a commission fee for their services, with banks also paying interest for storing money with them and the creation of fractional-reserve banking and how it created banknotes. This would then transition into the establishment of the federal reserve and the start of World War I, and how Germany disassociated with the gold backing of the Papiermark but still continue to print it, making the country fall into an economic depression. It talks about how after World War I, the United States also abandoned the gold backing and removing the "Redeemable for Gold" printing on dollar bills after the Gold Reserve Act was implemented.

The scene then moves to World War II, where it talks about the United States continuing to amass gold from weapons sales. It then talks about how this led to the Bretton Woods Conference and its resultant system, which then-President Richard Nixon nullified amidst the Vietnam War. With fractional-reserve banking now under the Federal Reserve system, money printing became more rampant, allowing banks to create bank credits against loan contracts such as mortgages.

The film then explains how interest works through the United States Department of the Treasury using bonds to print money and promising to pay it with a set amount of interest where the federal reserve buys these bonds via private banks where when the transaction is completed, federal reserve notes are then printed. The film goes on to question the legitimacy of the money and its backing, which goes into the next topic of how oil is used as a commodity to back the dollar under the guise of OPEC using petrocurrency through petrodollar recycling known as the Petrodollar System which in turn causes a cycle of money printing and exporting that goes back to oil-producing countries like Saudi Arabia who then sell the oil for U.S. dollars and then buys other commodities using it. The film continues to talk about the petrodollar system and how it caused the United States to spend more money then it had, it referenced the United States Deficit report of 2014 and how the United States earned $3 trillion but had to spend $3.5 trillion in expenses, causing a $500 billion difference, and to pay off the debt the United States uses bonds to borrow the extra money to pay off these debts through what is called deficit spending and is enabled through the petrodollar system.

The film then threatens the United States, saying it will "be destroyed on the same foundation upon which it was established", and talks about how the United States runs on an "interest system" where if U.S. dollars are constantly used to pay off debts owed to the United States, the financial base of it would not exist and how Russia and China both show willingness to "strategically attack the petrodollar system and bond market". Afterwards, the film talks about how the establishment of the Islamic State and its foundation "upon faith" would attack the economy of the United States and then talks about the establish of the Islamic State gold dinar and how, through the control of both Syrian and Iraq oil fields, would only sell them for gold and silver.

At the end of the film, the Islamic State member Lavdrim Muhaxheri, who goes by the nom de guerre Abu Abdallah al-Kosovi, explains how the Islamic State doesn't fight for wealth or land but only fights in, what they call, "righteous jihad" and "jihad for the sake of Allah" which transitions into a music video for the nasheed "For the Sake of Allah", produced by the Al-Hayat Media Center.
