= Al-Hayat Media Center =

Media wing of the Islamic State

- Founded: 2014
- Founder: Islamic State
- Headquarters: Syria

Al-Hayat Media Center (Arabic: مركز الحياة للإعلام) is the media wing of the Islamic State. It was established in mid-2014 and targets international (non-Arabic) audiences as opposed to their other Arabic-focused media wings and produces material, mostly Nasheeds, in English, German, Russian, Urdu, Indonesian, Turkish, Bengali, Chinese, Bosnian, Kurdish, Uyghur, and French.

== History ==
=== 2014-2015 ===
In July 2014, al-Hayat began publishing a digital magazine called Dabiq, in a number of different languages including English. According to the magazine, its name is taken from the town of Dabiq in northern Syria, which is mentioned in a hadith about Armageddon. Al-Hayat also began publishing other digital magazines, including the Turkish language Konstantiniyye, the Ottoman word for Istanbul, and the French language Dar al-Islam. By late 2016, these magazines had apparently all been discontinued, with Al-Hayat's material being consolidated into a new magazine called Rumiyah (Arabic for Rome).

In 2014, al-Hayat published a 24-minute propaganda video in Kurdish, as well as a Kurdish Nasheed called "Descendants of the Caliphate". The video featured Abu Khattab al-Kurdi promising to "bring the Caliphate to Kurdistan and to end the PUK and KDP's atheism".

On 29 June 2014 it released The End of Sykes-Picot, a reference to the 1916 accord that European states used to divide up the region after World War I and in which it calls for destruction of the border between Iraq and Syria. The subject of the video is Abu Safiyya.

19 September 2014 al-Hayat Media Center presents a video: “Flames of War: The Fighting Has Just Begun”.

al-Hayat released a series of videos called Lend Me Your Ears, in which the hostage man who appeared in is British journalist John Cantlie. The Introduction was released on 18 September 2014, the first episode on 18 September 2014, the second episode on 30 September 2014, the third episode on 12 October 2014, the fourth episode on 16 October 2014, the fifth episode on 12 November 2014, and the last episode on 24 November 2014.

In February 2015 British he reappeared in a propaganda video walking around ruins and interviewing locals in the northwestern Syrian city of Aleppo. It was called "Inside Aleppo" (12:00 minutes) and was published on 9 February 2015, where he states that it would be the last film in the "Inside" series. The others video were "Inside 'Ayn al-Islam (Kobani)", published on 28 October 2014 and filmed during a brief period when Kobani was occupied by IS, and "Inside Mosul", published on 3 January 2015 and posted on YouTube by Italian broadcaster Canal 25.

On 15 February it released a video titled “A message signed with blood to the nation of the cross”.

On 18 February it released a nasheed in French called Extend your Hand to Pledge Allegiance (French: Tends ta main pour l'allégeance), which begins with speech by Abu Bakr Al-Baghdadi and it is urged to make the hijra and join IS.

In 2015, Al-Hayat released a video called "Turkey and the fire of nationalism", all in Istanbul Turkish with a small portion in Kurmanji Kurdish.

In 2015, Al-Hayat released a nasheed song "We are Mujahid" (我们是圣战士, although the lyric sings "Mujahid" verbatim), sung in Mandarin Chinese, which was the first ever Chinese jihadist materials published by IS. It was speculated that the song was targeting Hui people (Chinese-speaking Muslims), as opposed to Uyghurs, who speak Turkic languages. Chinese mass media and the Chinese government did not talk about it since they did not want to get involved with the battle against IS.

In September 2015, it released an English nasheed video entitled "For the Sake of Allah", it was shown in its movie-like video "Return of the Gold Dinar", which was a propaganda video showing the Islamic State's new currency and denouncing banknotes and interest. It was explained by Lavdrim Muhaxheri.

In November 2015, it released a Russian nasheed video entitled "Soon, Very Soon" (Russian: Скоро очень скоро) telling Islamic State supporters to attack Russian churches and government buildings.

Later that same month, it released a propaganda video in multiple languages, notably in English, titled "No Respite", in which Western society, politicians and the United States Armed Forces are mocked, with the narrator stating that they "may have the numbers and weapons", but that their soldiers "lack the will and resolve". The narrator brags about the territory controlled by IS, stating that "its territory is already greater than Britain, eight times the size of Belgium, and thirty times the size of Qatar". The video includes Barack Obama, George W. Bush and Bill Clinton, calling them "liars and fornicators".

=== 2016-2017 ===
In January 2016 it released a video titled Kill Them Wherever You Find Them (French: Tuez-les où que vous les rencontriez) showing the Paris attackers threatening future violence. Four Belgians, three French nationals, and two Iraqis appeared in the video, carrying out executions alternated with Paris attacks scenes. Those nine terrorists were Abdelhamid Abaaoud (Abu Umar al-Baljiki), Chakib Akrouh (Abu Mujahid al-Baljiki), Brahim Abdeslam (Abul-Qaqe al-Baljiki); the attackers at Bataclan, Samy Amimour (Abu Qital al-Faransi), Ismaël Omar Mostefaï (Abu Rayyan al-Faransi) and Foued Mohamed-Aggad (Abu Fuad al-Faransi); and the attacker at Stade de France, Bilal Hadfi (Dhu-l-Qarnayn al-Faransi) and the Iraqis Ali al-Iraqi and Ukashah al-Iraqi.

In April 2016 it released a video featuring a large group of IS child recruits singing in French wearing suicide belts and other weapons during military training. It was titled "Blood for Blood" (French: Sang pour Sang). Then again in April 2016, they advertised a new monthly series called "Top 10" which takes videos from IS' provinces and creates a compilation of those clips. It made a 52-second trailer for The Flames of War, a video series called Mujatweets and a nashid (Islamic chant) in French named "My revenge" (Ma vengeance) in which it praised the Brussels bombing and both Paris attacks.

On 20 April 2017, it released a Turkish nasheed video titled "The Islamic State has been established" (Turkish: Kuruldu Islam Devletı) which incited Turkish Muslims to join the Islamic State and attack Turkey to gain more land for the Islamic State.

Logo of the "Inside the Caliphate/Khilafah" series produced by AlHayat Media Center

On 28 July 2017, it released an online video series in English and Arabic entitled "Inside the Caliphate", which focuses on life inside the Islamic State. The first episode dealt with the new currency of the Islamic State and said how it should be used around the globe, The second video dealt with the battle of Raqqa where Australian Islamic State militant under the alias Abu Adam talked about "Victory being near". The third episode talked about the siege of Marawi and the Islamic State soldiers in the conflict, in which it was released the Brothers in Marawi nasheed. The fourth episode gives a speech from a Singaporean Islamic State militant under the alias Abu 'Uqayl talking about U.S. and British involvement in the Syrian civil war, and targets Prince Harry and the British government. The fifth episode gives a speech from Arabic Islamic State militant under the alias Abul Abbass about the loss of territory and to be patient, and threatens non-Islamic State armies and militants in war. The sixth episode is a speech from an American Islamic State militant under the alias Abu Salih, who talked about the gun laws in America and told supporters of the Islamic State to buy arms and commit mass shootings. The seventh episode shows the Syrian civil war and suicide bombers in VBIEDs attacking Syrian soldiers, it also featured an unknown Islamic State woman fighting with a Kalashnikov. The eighth and last episode revolves around the Islamic State's mass propaganda, and American production companies, and told Islamic State supporters to create accounts and post Islamic State videos on platforms like Facebook and Twitter.

On 29 November 2017, it released Flames of War II.

On 31 December 2017 it spread via Telegram O' Disbelievers of the World (French: Mécréants de l'humanité) which shows an apocalyptic view of the war between IS and the unbelief. The video shows Donald Trump, Bashar al-Assad, Abdullah of Saudi Arabia, Putin, Netanyahu and Emmanuel Macron. It features an opening monologue from spokesman Abu Muhammad al-Adnani, and the nasheed is recited by Jean-Michel Clain.

=== 2018-present ===
On 26 January 2018 it released a nasheed in English called Answer the Call where supporters were urged to carry out gruesome terror attacks in Western countries.

On 21 March 2019, the U.S. Department of State officially deemed al-Hayat an alias of ISIS, and thus a Foreign Terrorist Organization.

On 26 July 2020, it released a video entitled "Incite the Believers" which shown ideas of terrorist attacks to lone wolf terrorists in western countries. In the video, they rated arson as a "5-star" terrorist attack, citing the California wild fires.

On 10 October 2020, IS supporters on Telegram released a nasheed titled "Coldly Kill Them". The nasheed was a ripoff of the Ajnad nasheed "Hubbu Waqumu Ya Al-Ansar" (Getup and rise, oh supporters), and it was uncertain whether the nasheed is affiliated to Al-Hayat.

== Nasheeds ==
Name	Language	Native name	Purpose	Citation
Answer the Call	English		Supporters of ISIS are urged to commit gruesome attacks against Western countries.	
Brothers in Marawi	English		Released on 12 October 2017, this nasheed talks about the supposed rewards in Jannah for the ISIS fighters in Marawi.	
Coldly Kill Them	English		This nasheed urges people to commit gruesome attacks because of the Muslims that have been killed in the past.	
For The Sake of Allah	English		Featured at the end of "Return Of The Gold Dinar". This nasheed explains their rewards for being at war.	
Advance, Advance	French	Avance, Avance	This nasheed tells people to advance and to "Kill the enemy or they'll kill you"	
Blood for Blood	French	Sang pour Sang	Was created as a nasheed video of young children singing with weapons and a suicide belt during military training, the nasheed was released after the video.	
By Love	French	Par Amour	Calls for French Muslims to martyr themselves via suicide bombings for the Islamic State.	
Hold Out Your Hand	French	Tends Ta Main	Was a nasheed released on 18 February 2015, it began with a speech by Abu Bakr al-Baghdadi urging people to make Hijrah for the Islamic State.	
My Revenge	French	Ma Vengeance	Released in April 2016, this nasheed praises the Brussels Airport Bombing and the Paris Attacks.	
O Disbelievers of the World	French	Mecréants de l'Humanité	Released in 31 December 2017. Sung by Jean-Michel Clain, This nasheed shows an apocalyptic view between the Islamic State and the kuffar (disbeliever).	
We Will Not Be Beaten	French	On Va Pas Se Laisser Abattre	This nasheed praises the attack on Charlie Hebdo and also says that they wish to die from fighting for Allah.	
Oh Soldiers of Truth, Let's Go	Arabic	يا جنود الحق هيا	It urges Muslims to fight the group's enemies. It says there has been an illumination in Syria, which is why everybody who wants to fight should immigrate to that land. It calls to break the Sykes-Picot border. It says that they target Jewish Rabbis and Christians. It says that the Islamic State will remain despite people's hatred of it.	
Lions of Allah	Turkish	Allah'ın Aslanları		
Come, O My Mujahid	Turkish	Haydi Ey Müçahidim		
Our Black Flag	Turkish	Kara Bayrağımız	This nasheed states that their land will increase day by day, waving their black flag (talking about the flag of the Islamic State).	
The Islamic State has Been Established	Turkish	Kuruldu İslam Devleti	Being released on 20 April 2017, this nasheed encourages Turkish people to join the Islamic State.	
Fisabilillah	German	Für Allahs Sache	Commonly known as "Fisabilillah", this nasheed calls the German people to commit terrorizing attacks and also boasting about how they are going to be victorious.	
Let's Go for Jihad	German	Haya Haya al Jihad		
Our State is Victorious	German	Unser Staat ist siegreich		
Soon, Very Soon	Russian	Скоро очень скоро	Shows ISIS urging its Russian supporters to attack Russian Churches and Russian government buildings.	
Descendants Of The Caliphate	Kurdish (Sorani)	Kulîlkên xîlafetê (نه وه کانی خیلافه ت)	Where Abu Khattab Al-Kurdi was trying to restore the caliphate and also tried to end PUK and KDP's "atheism"	
We Are Mujahid	Chinese	我们是圣战者	This nasheed encourages Chinese Hui people to join the Islamic State.	
Arise, O Mujahid	Bengali	জেগে ওঠো মুজাহিদ	Calls for supporters of the Islamic State in Bangladesh to attack, what it deems as, apostates in Bangladesh.	
A Mujahid's Story	Bengali	এক মুজাহিদের গল্প শুনো	Attempts to encourage people in Bangladesh to join the Islamic State, citing supposed rewards in the afterlife.	
Come, My Friend	Uyghur	که لگن دوستوم	Encourages people of Uyghur descent to join the Islamic State.	

== See also ==
- Al-Bayan (radio station)
- Dabiq (magazine)
- Al-Furat Media Center
