= The Chosen Few of Different Lands =

- Banner ad used for the video
- Music by: Ajnad Media for Audio Production
- Production company: Al-Hayat Media Center
- Release date: 2014
- Running time: 11:07
- Country: Syria

The Chosen Few of Different Lands (Arabic: القلة المختارة من الأراضي المختلفة, romanized: Alqlh al-mukhtārah min al-arāḍī al-mukhtalifah) is a video created by the Islamic State's propaganda wing Al-Hayat Media Center surrounded on the life of André Poulin (known by the alias in the video as Abu Muslim) before his death and the capturing of his death on film during the siege of Menagh Air Base. The main impact that the video attempted to conceive is to recruit foreigners to join the Islamic State and fight in their operations in Syria. The video was released a year after the death of Poulin.

== Video ==
The video was released in July 2014 by Al-Hayat Media Center and starts off with André Poulin explaining who he is with high definition stock footage of Canadian landscapes where André Poulin attempted to state he was a regular civilian in Canada before converting to Islam, stating "It wasn’t like I was some anarchist, or somebody who just wants to destroy the world and kill everybody. No, I was a very good person, and you know, mujahideen are regular people too.". The video attempted to demonstrate the sentiments that the Islamic State was more reasonable and less barbaric with these statements, though these statements are false due to the face that André Poulin did have conflicting ideologies during his time in Canada, adapting to communism and anarchism before his conversion to Islam. Poulin states in the video that the Islamic State wants recruits, and doesn't need them, comparing the Islamic State's "muhajireen" (emigrants) to a gold mine where the mine is opened and thriving before it closes, further urging foreigners to join the Islamic State as not only combatants but engineers, medical staff, et cetera. Poulin states that Muslims living in the western world are deplorable as they live among the "kuffar", stating that the lives of happiness should be put aside for jihad. The narrator, Mohammed Khalifa, continually emphasized being a member of the chosen few as a psychological tactic as seen in the Hero's Journey writing style to not only encapsulate the viewer to the video but to emotional need. At the end showing Poulin's death, the narrator emphasizes the importance of martyrdom and the istishhadi values of the Islamic State as something deemed one of the greatest deeds a person can do.

A month after the video was released, it would be translated by South Asian supporters of the Islamic State into Tamil, Urdu, and Hindi to convince South Asian Muslims to join.
