= André Poulin =

Canadian Islamic militant (1990–2013)

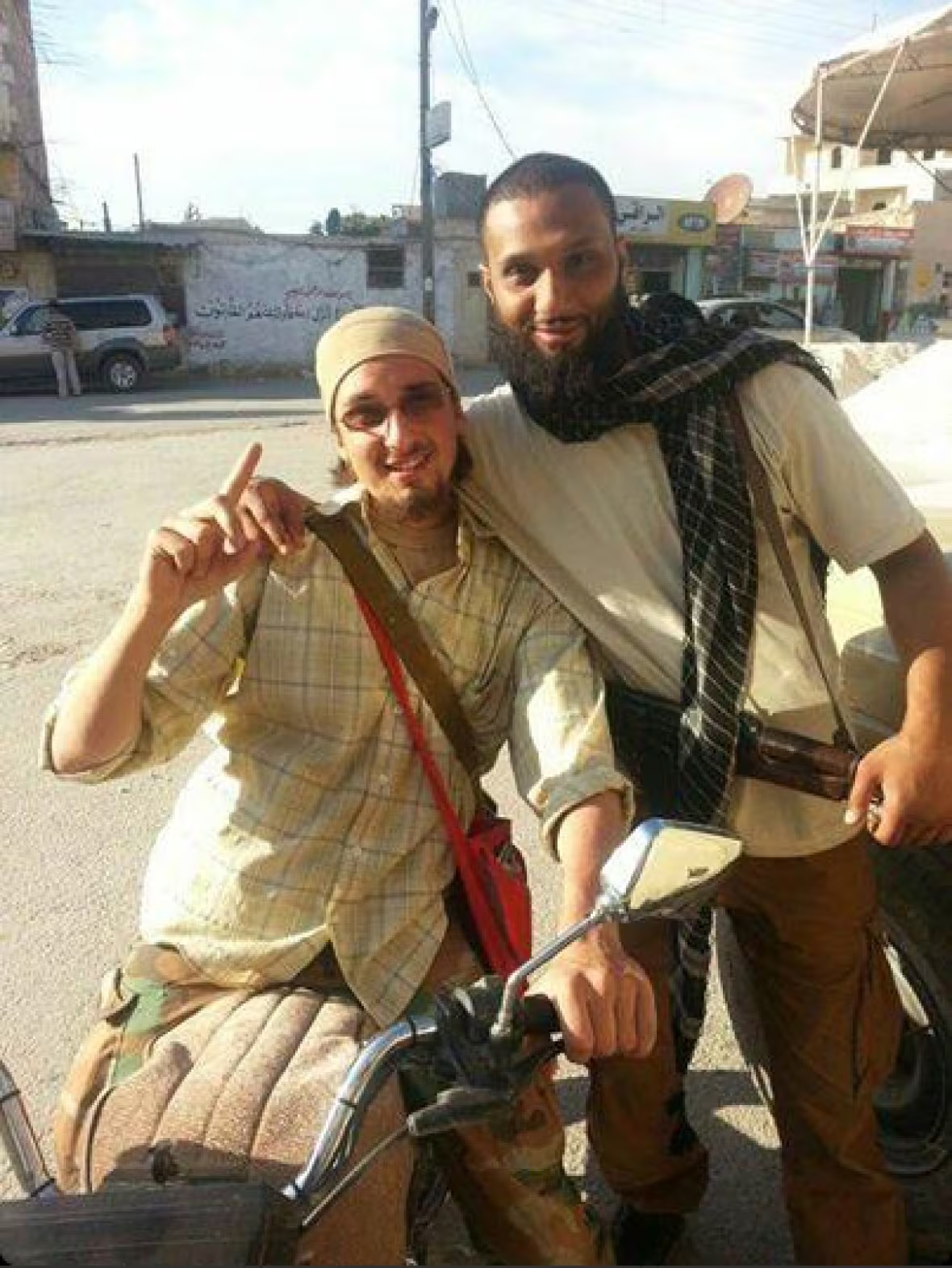
- André Poulin (left) on a scooter in Aleppo with Abdul al-Hazra (right)
- Born: 1990; Timmins, Ontario, Canada
- Died: August 8, 2013 (aged 22–23); Menagh Air Base, Aleppo, Syria
- Military career
- Allegiance: Islamic State; Liwa al-Muhajireen wal-Ansar
- Service years: 2012—2013
- Nickname: Abu Muslim al-Kanadi
- Conflicts: Syrian civil war; Battle of Aleppo (2012–2016); Siege of Menagh Air Base †

André Richard Omer Poulin (born 1990—August 8, 2013), known by his nom de guerre Abu Muslim al-Kanadi (Arabic: أبو مسلم الكندي, lit. 'Abu Muslim the Canadian'), was a Canadian Islamic convert and Islamic State militant who left Canada to Syria in late 2012 to fight the Ba'athist regime.

== Life ==
Poulin was born in Timmins, Ontario, Canada, in 1990. He worked as a local street janitor and earned approximately 2,000 Canadian dollars per month before converting to Islam in 2008. Before converting, Poulin showed interest in both communism and anarchism. After he followed a strict interpretation of Islam which radicalized him. He read The Anarchist Cookbook to learn about explosives, became violent towards people he knew, and had an affair with a married woman also threatening her husband for not being religious enough which earned him a couple weeks in jail. After his incarceration, Poulin spent significant time online, during which he made threats to bomb a local gas station.

=== Militancy ===
In late 2012 Poulin left Canada for Syria to join with the Katibat al-Muhajireen (Brigade of the Emigrants), at the same time Mohammed Emwazi joined ISIS. During Poulin's time in Syria, Poulin recruited 5 other Canadians to join ISIS. Poulin had met the recruits in 2011 and radicalized over the next few years, though 3 of his recruits were rescued by their families before crossing into Syria from Lebanon the rest stayed to join ISIS. After Poulin arrived in Syria he married a woman, who then got pregnant before she passed.

=== Death ===
Poulin participated in the siege of Menagh Air Base against both Free Syrian Army militants and Ba'athist soldiers. During this siege, on August 8, 2013, Poulin joined other militants in an attempt to seize the air base during the offensive. This caused him to be hit by a rocket-propelled grenade and subsequently be killed.

==== After death ====
Approximately a year after Poulin's death in July 2014, the Islamic State's official media-wing al-Hayat Media Center produced a video entitled "The Chosen Few of Different Lands" which is 11-minutes long showing Poulin (shown under the alias Abu Muslim) making statements to potential recruits on how he was a regular Canadian and that they can join ISIS. Poulin stated that ISIS needed more than just fighters for the so-called mujahideen and ISIS needs engineers, doctors, et cetera. The video was professionally edited and included stock footage from North America, such as clips from official Alberta tourism videos.
