= Flames of War: The Fighting Has Just Begun =

2014 extremist propaganda film produced for the Islamic State

- Banner Ad for Flames of War
- لهيب الحرب: الآن قد جاء القتال
- Produced by: Al-Hayat Media Center
- Narrated by: Mohammed Khalifa
- Music by: Ajnad Media Production Foundation for Audio
- Production company: Al-Hayat Media Center
- Distributed by: Al-Hayat Media Center
- Release date: 20 September 2014 (Raqqa)
- Running time: 55 minutes
- Country: Iraq or Syria (Note: Countries where the Islamic State had territories in at the time of the film's release)
- Languages: English; Arabic; Russian; Thai (non-official)

Flames of War (Arabic: لهيب الحرب, romanized: Lahīb al-ḥarb) also known by its full name Flames of War: The Fighting has Just Begun (Arabic: لهيب الحرب: الآن قد جاء القتال, romanized: Lahīb al-ḥarb : al-a'an qad ja'a al-Qital) is an extremist propaganda film by the Islamic State, produced by Al-Hayat Media Center and narrated by Mohammed Khalifa in the film's English version, it was released on 20 September 2014.

== History ==
On September 17, 2014, the Islamic State released a trailer for the film through their media producer, Al-Hayat Media Center, via YouTube which was spread all throughout the internet, it was released shortly after then-President of the United States, Barack Obama, outlined his plan to go after the Islamic State in the Middle East. The trailer and all advertisements were spread heavily through Twitter (now X), JustPaste.it, and YouTube with one video getting 18,034 views within seven hours on 18 September 2014. The trailer is 52-seconds long and featured multiple bombings and combat footage with a teaser of the execution that was at the end of the film. The video is also considered not only a threat to the United States but also Al-Qaeda, with Al-Qaeda releasing a video announcing the establishment of Al-Qaeda in the Indian Subcontinent a week prior to the release of the trailer. The films, Flames of War and Flames of War II are both one of the very few Islamic State publications to feature teasers or trailers, as such things are only created for more sophisticated publications by the Islamic State.

=== Responses to film ===
The United States Department of State project's Think Again, Turn Away YouTube channel posted multiple YouTube videos in response to the films release in order to combat propaganda using propaganda, but was considered less rhetorically effective than the Islamic States' videos, including a one-dimensional narrative, a stance that could appear inauthentic, and a lack of sensitivity to Islamic culture. The Syrian director, Muhammad Bayezid, said the film was "made with high professionalism" and added "I will not say that it is at the level of Hollywood, but inevitably whoever wrote the text, montage and photography did not do it for the first time but is mostly professional." where Egyptian director, Imad El-Din Al-Sayed, also said the film "belongs to the quality of the films Spider-Man and Captain America, which are based on an interesting story using montage, graphics, and soundtrack, and the presence of super-characteristic superheroes.".

== Film ==
The film was released on September 20, 2014, with the entire film itself was 55 minutes long, which featured graphics and combat footage (GoPro footage as well) from the Islamic States' campaign in Iraq and Syria and an execution video at the end showing multiple captured Syrian soldiers from the 17th Division Base that was captured during the 2014 Eastern Syria offensive digging their own grave before being executed by several Islamic State militants with one of the militants speaking to the camera before doing show, who has a North American accent and speaks fluent English calling the captured soldiers the "soldiers of Bashar". The film is described as a Blockbuster-like western-styled movie made to intimidate the western world and to appeal to American supporters of the Islamic State, also a film made by the Islamic State about the Islamic State. According to analysis, the cameramen recording combat footage and montages was holding a small camcorder with a flip-out viewfinder. Other images betray the shallow depth of field of a digital single-lens reflex camera, such as a Canon EOS 5D or Canon EOS 7D which is easy to operate and to keep in focus. They use radio microphones for sound. The effects and graphics and image-manipulation tools that are used show that the editors are using a form of editing software like Adobe Premiere Pro; or even phone apps to do slow-mo effects. The film was considered extremely technical and high-quality, with the film being released onto YouTube garnering over 2 million views before being deleted by YouTube moderation. The film was originally uploaded to the YouTube channel laqasci117o before being deleted. Not only was the film released on surface web video sharing platforms, but was also shared on official Islamic State media websites on the dark web.

The film opens with an introduction to the situation involving the Islamic State and their stance against their adversaries, featuring the phrase, "You are with us, or against us," followed by a video clip of former United States President George W. Bush making a similar statement. It also includes an excerpt from Bush's 2003 "mission accomplished" speech given aboard the USS Abraham Lincoln during the Iraq War. The film then suggests that the conflict was only beginning to escalate. The concept that "the flames of war have only just begun" is reiterated by the narrator, Mohammed Khalifa, throughout the video. Additionally, before delving into the main content, the video presents a segment discussing Muslims who have deviated from traditional Islamic beliefs, particularly criticizing those who assert or believe that physical jihad is not an essential aspect of the religion.

Afterwards, the film features a segment of Islamic State militants on horses, holding the Islamic State flag, and holding AK-47s while the narrator talks about the Islamic State's military advancements, mythologizing the Islamic States' military heroism.

The initial segment focuses on a group of fighters attempting to take control of a Syrian airbase. The process of the takeover is documented and narrated, detailing the reconnaissance, trench digging, use of artillery to support advancing troops, disabling of enemy tanks with shoulder-fired weapons, and the capture of a radar station. The narrator emphasizes that Islamic State fighters are distinct from their adversaries because their motivation is spiritual rather than material. However, any loot acquired after the conflict is viewed as a "reward from Allah". The filmmakers suggest that their success against stronger opponents on various fronts supposedly demonstrates Allah's support for the Islamic State. Several scenes depict fighters approaching enemy tanks on foot. The tank crews attempt to leave their vehicles but are shot in the process. The narrator states that "Allah guides the RPG grenade and punishes the enemy through the fighters, portraying the tank hunters, armed only with handheld rockets and IEDs, as the ultimate symbol of sacrifice". This segment is considered a classic portrayal of "good versus evil" as shown in other Islamic State propaganda.

The footage afterwards shows an Islamic State fighter who has died, accompanied by an audio clip from Abu Musab al-Zarqawi stating that the path is not easy. It depicts the idea that the mujahideen are committed to either victory or death. The camera focuses on the faces of two deceased fighters. The narrator, Mohammed Khalifa, continues to state that the Islamic State has expanded into new territories and has gained support from some civilians.

Following the initial military success depicted in "Flames of War," the video seeks to illustrate the profound gratitude expressed by the local civilian population for their perceived "liberation" by the Islamic State. Similar to certain articles featured in Dabiq, it portrays the residents warmly welcoming the fighters into their communities and requesting provisions for the populace. Additionally, akin to Issue 7 of Dabiq, it condemns numerous Islamic leaders globally who appeared on television to provide interviews and disseminate what it characterizes as "falsehoods" regarding the Islamic State. The narrator, Mohammed Khalifa, asserts that falsehoods of this nature have been propagated to "rationalize" the hostility exhibited by "apostate" Muslims towards the Islamic State. He contends that all forms of resistance to the Islamic State in the region of Sham (the Levant) have ultimately been futile. To illustrate this point, the video subsequently presents instances of triumphs over the PKK (Kurdistan Workers' Party), as well as Syrian and Iraqi military forces. A close-quarters engagement with "Safawi" (Shia) soldiers is depicted, with a mere thirty feet separating the opposing sides. Although the adversaries are equipped with body armor and receive support from armored troop carriers, they swiftly disintegrate and retreat in the face of the ISIS combatants.

At the end of the film, and what is considered the most infamous part of the film, shows a masked man who speaks fluent English with Syrian members of the 17th Division in the countryside of Raqqa Governorate which was, at the time, the capital of the Islamic State, who were captured from the Menagh Air Base south of Azaz, Aleppo Governorate, near the village of Menagh in which the scenes of captured soldiers from the 17th Division of the regime forces digging their graves, as one of them said, that Bashar al-Assad abandoned them and withdrew his officers from the division, while leaving the elements fighting the Islamic State, calling on the families of the regime's soldiers to withdraw their children from service Military in the army of the regime. The masked man added that 800 members of the regime forces were in the 17th division that fell into the hands of the Islamic State weeks ago of the incident and were defeated in front of only dozens of Islamic State elements. After that, the masked man appeared in the video carrying a pistol and saying in English "They said that we left the fronts and stopped fighting the Kuffar (infidels) to turn our guns to the Muslims .. They lied .. Walahi, we are the harshest to the Kuffar. And the flames of war are only beginning to intensify." He concluded by saying "Walahi, the fighting has just begun", before he and a number of his armed colleagues shot the captured men in the head in a execution where they then fell into the grave they dug.

=== Flames of War II ===
Flames of War II (Arabic: لهيب الحرب 2) was released on November 30, 2017, over three years after the release of Flames of War, it was also produced and made by Al-Hayat Media Center. The full name of the film is Flames of War II: Until the Final Hour (Arabic: لهيب الحرب 2: الى قيام الساعة, romanized: Lahīb al-ḥarb al-thāniyah : ila qiyam al-sa'ah) and featured the same type of style of combat footage, it also featured and execution of multiple Syrian soldiers at the end of the film which was spearheaded by another masked man who spoke in fluent English and had a North American accent. The first 24 minutes of the film deals with the recapturing of the Syrian city of Palmyra during the 2017 Palmyra offensive and multiple clips of bombings of Syrian army and Syrian rebel sites using VBIEDs, with an assault using an infantry unit of the military of the Islamic State being used. This film was also narrated by Mohammed Khalifa.
