= November 2015 Paris attacks =

2015 Islamist terror attacks in France

- Part of Islamic terrorism in Europe and the spillover of the Syrian Civil War
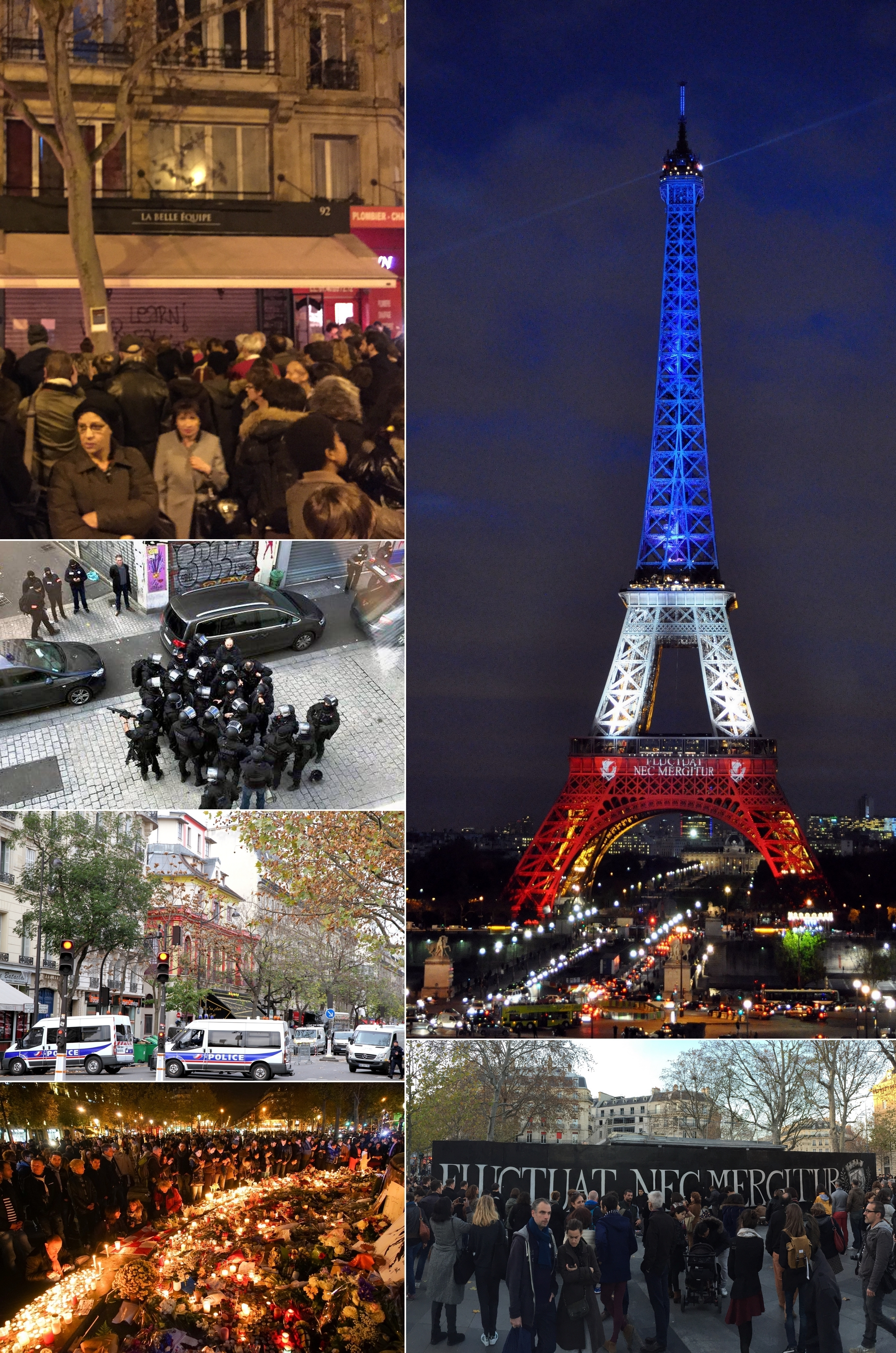
- Public memorials for the victims and police near the scenes of some of the attacks

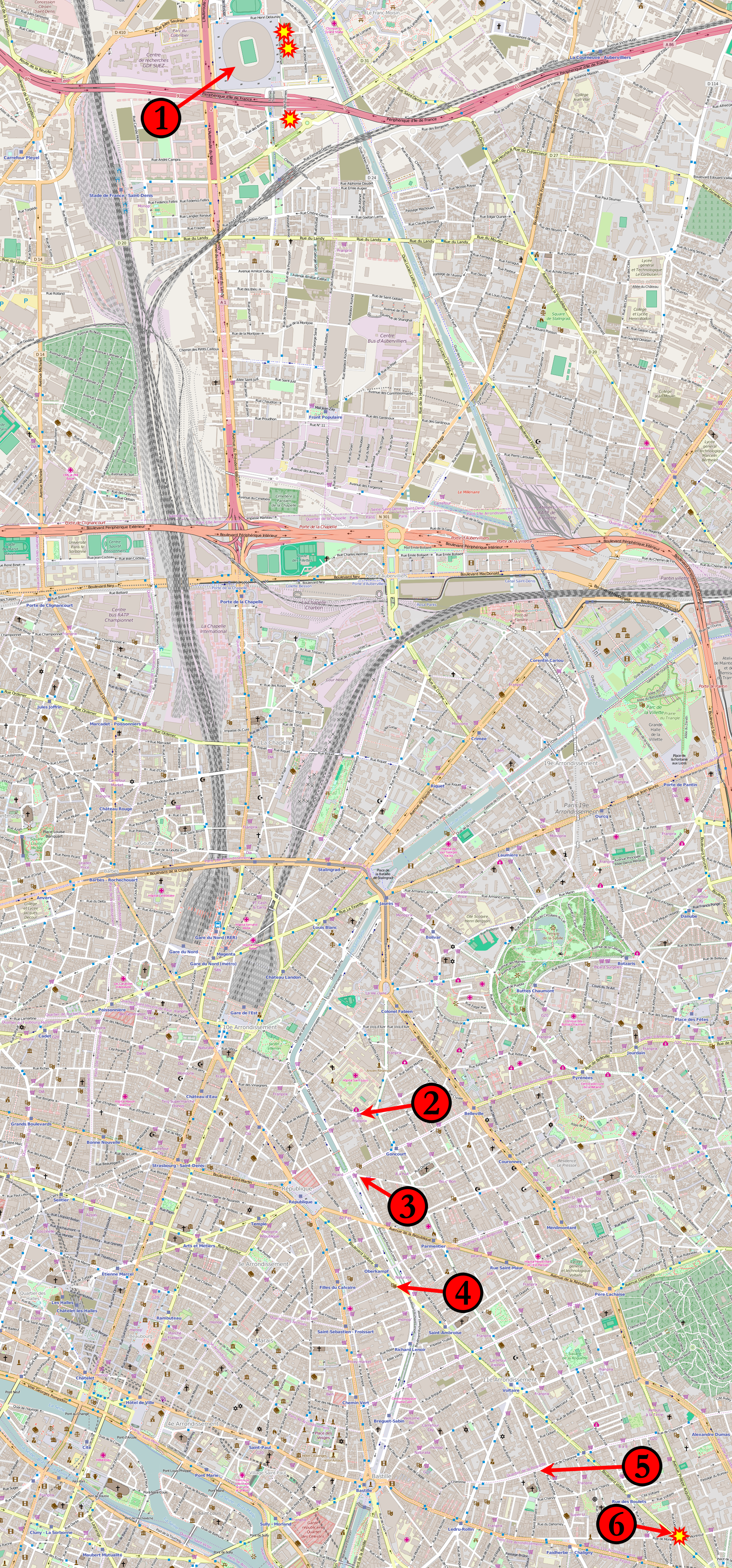
- Locations of the attacks—stars denote suicide bombings
- Native name: Attentats du 13-Novembre
- Location: Paris and Saint-Denis, France
- Date: 21:16, 13 November 2015 – 00:58, 14 November 2015 (CET)
- Target: 1. Near Stade de France (Note: Coordinates: 48.924°N 2.362°E); 2. Rues Bichat and Alibert (Le Petit Cambodge; Le Carillon) (Note: Coordinates: 48.8719°N 2.3679°E); 3. Rue de la Fontaine-au-Roi (Café Bonne Bière; La Casa Nostra) (Note: Coordinates: 48.8687°N 2.3682°E); 4. The Bataclan theatre (Note: Coordinates: 48.8630°N 2.3707°E); 5. Rue de Charonne (La Belle Équipe) (Note: Coordinates: 48.8539°N 2.3822°E); 6. Boulevard Voltaire (Comptoir Voltaire) (Note: Coordinates: 48.8504°N 2.3931°E)
- Attack type: Islamic terrorism, mass shooting, mass murder, suicide bombing and hostage-taking
- Weapons: 4 Zastava M70 assault rifles, 1 Bulgarian AKKS-47 rifle, 1 Chinese Norinco Type 56-1, TATP suicide belts, butcher knives (unused)
- Deaths: 137 (including 7 attackers)
- Injuries: At least 875
- Victims: Both of civilians and security forces
- Perpetrator: Islamic State (Brussels terror cell)
- Assailants: Stade De France: • Salah Abdeslam (Driver); • Ahmad al-Mohammed (Bomber); • M. al-Mahmod (Bomber); • Bilal Hadfi (Bomber); Restaurant shootings and bombing: • Abdelhamid Abaaoud (Ringleader); • Ibrahim Abdeslam (Bomber); • Chakib Akrouh; Bataclan Theatre: • Foued Mohamed-Aggad; • Ismail Omar Mostefai; • Samy Amimour
- No. of participants: 10 (including Salah Abdeslam)
- Motive: Islamic extremism, retaliation against French airstrikes on ISIL

A series of coordinated terrorist attacks by Islamic extremists took place on Friday, 13 November 2015 in Paris, France, and the city's northern suburb, Saint-Denis. Beginning at 21:16, three suicide bombers struck outside the Stade de France in Saint-Denis, during an international football match, after failing to gain entry to the stadium. Another group of attackers then fired on crowded cafés and restaurants in Paris with one of them also detonating an explosive, killing himself in the process. A third group carried out another mass shooting and took hostages at an Eagles of Death Metal concert attended by 1,500 people in the Bataclan theatre, leading to a stand-off with police. The attackers were either shot or detonated suicide vests when police raided the theatre.

The attackers killed 130 people, including 90 at the Bataclan theatre. Another 416 people suffered physical injuries, almost 100 critically, while 457 more were hospitalized for acute psychological trauma. Seven of the attackers were also killed. The attacks were the deadliest in the European Union since the Madrid train bombings of 2004, and the deadliest terrorist attack in the history of France. The attacks came one day after similar attacks in Beirut, Lebanon, and thirteen days after the bombing of a Russian airliner over the Sinai Peninsula in Egypt. France had been on high alert since the January 2015 attacks on Charlie Hebdo offices and a Jewish supermarket in Paris that killed 17 people.

The Islamic State (IS) claimed responsibility for the attacks (as they had done with the Beirut attacks a day prior), saying that it was retaliation for French airstrikes on Islamic State targets in Syria and Iraq. The president of France, François Hollande, said the attacks were an act of war by the Islamic State. The attacks were planned in Syria and organised by a terrorist cell based in Belgium. Two of the Paris attackers were Iraqis, but most were born in France or Belgium, and had fought in Syria. Some of the attackers had returned to Europe among the flow of migrants and refugees from Syria.

In response to the attacks, a three-month state of emergency was declared across the country to help fight terrorism, which involved the banning of public demonstrations, and allowing the police to carry out searches without a warrant, put anyone under house arrest without trial, and block websites that encouraged acts of terrorism. On 15 November, France launched the biggest airstrike of Opération Chammal, its part in the bombing campaign against Islamic State. The authorities searched for surviving attackers and accomplices. On 18 November, the suspected lead operative of the attacks, Abdelhamid Abaaoud, was killed in a police raid in Saint-Denis, along with two others.

== Background ==
France had been on high alert for terrorism since the Charlie Hebdo shooting and a series of related attacks in January by militants belonging to Al-Qaeda in the Arabian Peninsula, and had increased security in anticipation of the 2015 United Nations Climate Change Conference, scheduled to be held in Paris at the beginning of December, as well as reinstating border checks a week before the attacks.

Throughout 2015, France witnessed smaller attacks: the February stabbing of three soldiers guarding a Jewish community centre in Nice, the June attempt to blow up a factory in Saint-Quentin Fallavier, and the August shooting and stabbing attack on a passenger train.

The Bataclan theatre had been threatened a number of times because of its support for Jewish organisations and Israel. Two Jewish brothers, Pascal and Joël Laloux, owned the Bataclan for more than 40 years before selling it in September 2015. In 2011, a group calling itself the Army of Islam told French security services they had planned an attack on the Bataclan because its owners were Jewish.

In the weeks leading up to the Paris attacks, ISIL and its branches had claimed responsibility for several other attacks: the downing of Metrojet Flight 9268 on 31 October and the suicide bombings in Beirut on 12 November.

Intelligence agencies in Turkey and Iraq had reportedly warned of an imminent attack on France months beforehand, but said they never heard back from the French authorities until after the attacks. According to The Irish Times, a senior French security official said they receive this kind of correspondence "every day".

This was one of two terrorist cells sent to Europe by the Islamic State in 2015, the other cell consisting of three Syrians was apprehended by German special police in Schleswig-Holstein in mid September 2016.

== Attacks ==
Timeline of attacks

13 November:

- 21:16 (Note: The times for the first two bombings originally given at a press conference by the prosecutor of Paris François Molins on 14 November 2015 were 21:20 and 21:30. However, video recording of the match shows that the gap between the first and the second explosion was around 3 minutes and 10 seconds, the first explosion being heard at 16:24 after the start of the match, and the second at 19:34. These correspond to 21:16 and 21:19 local time, the game having started at 21:00.) – First suicide bombing near the Stade de France.
- 21:19 – Second suicide bombing near the Stade de France.
- 21:24 – Shooting at the rue Bichat.
- 21:26 – Shooting at the rue de la Fontaine-au-Roi.
- 21:36 – Shooting at the rue de Charonne.
- 21:40 – Suicide bombing on boulevard Voltaire.
- 21:40 – Three men enter the Bataclan theatre and begin shooting.
- 21:53 – Third suicide bombing near the Stade de France.
- 22:00 – Hostages are taken at the Bataclan.

14 November:

- 00:20 – Security forces enter the Bataclan.
- 00:58 – French police end the siege on the Bataclan.
All times are CET (UTC+1).

Three groups of men launched six distinct attacks: three suicide bombings in one attack, a fourth suicide bombing in another attack, and shootings at four locations. The shootings were in the vicinity of the rue Alibert, the rue de la Fontaine-au-Roi, the rue de Charonne, the Bataclan theatre, and avenue de la République. Three explosions occurred near the Stade de France, another on boulevard Voltaire, and two of the Bataclan shooters also detonated their suicide vests as police ended the standoff. According to the Paris prosecutor, the attackers wore suicide vests that used acetone peroxide as an explosive. French police reports on cellphones recovered from crime scenes showed that the attacks were being coordinated in real time from Brussels, Belgium, the location of origin of the terrorist cell to which the Paris attackers belonged.

=== Stade de France bombings ===
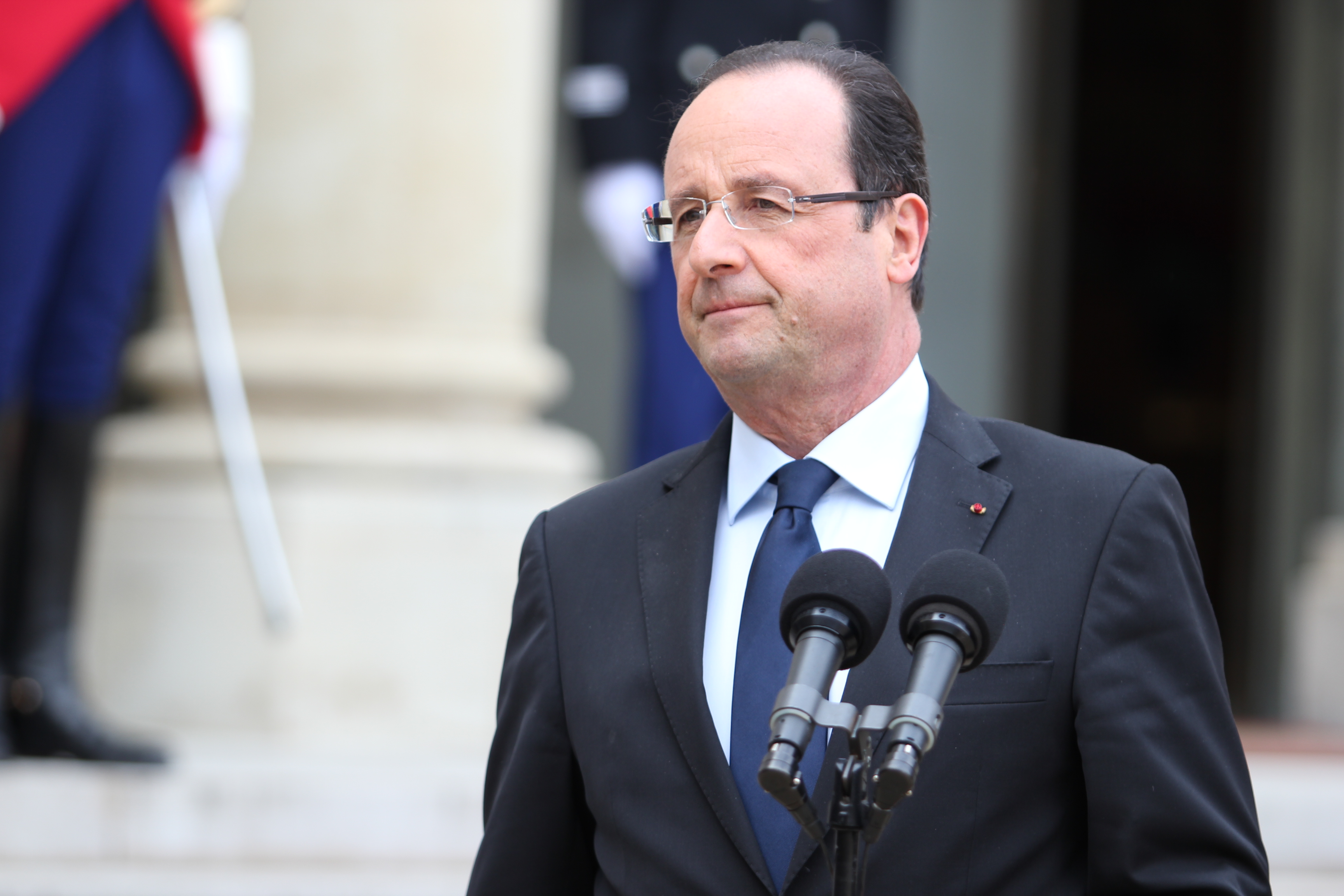
President François Hollande (pictured in 2013) was at the Stade de France during the attacks.

Three explosions occurred near the country's national sports stadium, the Stade de France, in the suburb of Saint-Denis, resulting in four deaths, including the three suicide bombers. The explosions happened at 21:16, 21:19, and 21:53. At the time, the stadium was hosting an international friendly soccer match between France and Germany, which President Hollande was attending. The suicide bombers arrived slightly late for the game, two of them wearing Bayern-Munich tracksuits as disguises, and eyewitness reports indicated they did not have tickets, resulting in them being turned away by security guards several times.

The first explosion near the stadium occurred about 20 minutes after the start of the game. The first bomber, a man under the pseudonym 'Ahmad al-Mohammad', was prevented from entering the stadium after a security guard patted him down and found the explosive vest. A few seconds after being turned away, he detonated the vest outside the security gate, killing himself and a bystander. Investigators later surmised that the first bomber had planned to detonate his vest within the stadium, triggering the crowd's panicked exit onto the streets where the two other bombers were lying in wait. Three minutes after the first bombing, the second bomber, a man under the pseudonym 'M al-Mahmod', blew himself up outside another security gate after repeatedly failing to find and enter a crowd of people. Another 34 minutes after that, Bilal Hadfi's vest detonated outside a McDonald's restaurant. Moments before, a woman encountered him in an alley and he asked her for directions to the McDonald's. As the explosion happened, people were being evacuated out of the McDonald's restaurant. According to some reports, the location of the third explosion was at a McDonald's restaurant, where over 50 people were injured, seven seriously; others state the bomb detonated some distance away from any discernible target.

Hollande was evacuated from the stadium at half-time, while the German foreign minister, Frank-Walter Steinmeier, remained at the stadium. Hollande met with his interior minister Bernard Cazeneuve to co-ordinate a response to the emergency. Two of the explosions were heard on the live televised broadcast of the match; both soccer coaches were informed by French officials of a developing crisis, but players and fans were kept unaware of it until the game had finished. Hollande, concerned that the safety of the crowd outside the stadium could not be assured if the match was immediately canceled, decided that the game should continue without a public announcement.

Following the game, fans were brought onto the pitch to await evacuation as police monitored all the exits around the venue. Security sources said all three explosions were suicide bombings. The German national football team was advised not to return to their hotel, where there had been a bomb threat earlier in the day, and they spent the night in the stadium on mattresses, along with the French team, who stayed with them in a display of camaraderie.

=== Restaurant shootings and bombing ===
The first shootings occurred around 21:24 on the rue Bichat and the rue Alibert, near the Canal Saint-Martin in the 10th arrondissement. The three Belgian-Moroccan attackers, including ringleader Abdelhamid Abaaoud who was driving, Brahim Abdeslam and Chakib Akrouh emerged from a rental SEAT León registration 1 GUT 180-B and began to open fire on nearby establishments. Abaaoud and Akrouh who were sat on the left side of the vehicle fired at the Cambodian restaurant Le Petit Cambodge. Brahim Abdeslam who was sat on the right side fired at the bar Le Carillon. According to French police, an eyewitness said one of the gunmen shouted "Allahu Akbar". Thirteen people were killed in total: four at Le Carillon, eight at Le Petit Cambodge, and one on the street nearby. Additionally, twenty-two people were injured, with ten victims in critical condition and twelve in serious condition. Approximately 130 rounds were fired; the three individuals fired 50, 24, and 56 rounds respectively. Afterwards, the assailants fled in the SEAT León. Doctors and nurses from the nearby Hôpital Saint-Louis were in Le Carillon when the attacks happened and supplied emergency assistance to the wounded.

After around 45 seconds of gunfire, they stepped back into their vehicle and drove away. They sped south down rue Bichat, turned right onto rue du Faubourg du Temple, and then left onto rue de la Fontaine au Roi before stopping the vehicle outside the brasserie La Bonne Bière. The drive lasted less than a minute.

At 21:26, the attackers arrived outside the brasserie La Bonne Bière, located close to the terrace of the Italian pizzeria La Casa Nostra, on the rue de la Fontaine-au-Roi. Abaaoud and Akrouh remained inside the vehicle and shot at the terrace of La Bonne Bière from the windows at a very close range. At La Bonne Bière, the shooting lasted for 56 seconds. Brahim Abdeslam stepped outside the vehicle and walked 30 meters down the street to the pizzeria La Casa Nostra, and began firing at the establishment. He can be seen on CCTV footage, firing for 15 seconds, before his weapon jams as he attempts to shoot 2 women hiding under a table on the terrace. Eventually, Brahim Abdeslam stepped back into the vehicle, with Abaaoud having driven the car closer to La Casa Nostra to collect Abdeslam. Three people were killed at La Bonne Bière and two on the streets near La Casa Nostra. Miraculously, nobody was killed at the La Casa Nostra establishment itself. Additionally, nineteen people were injured, with eight people in critical condition and 11 in serious condition. An eyewitness reported seeing a gunman firing short bursts. The three terrorists fired approximately 110 rounds; 56, 25, and 29 rounds respectively. The assailants then fled again in the SEAT León.

Within approximately 90 seconds of the start of the shooting at La Bonne Bière, the assailants drove off in their vehicle. This time, they drove more slowly, abiding by traffic laws, as they searched for targets. They drove down rue de la Fontaine au Roi before turning right onto Avenue Parmentier in the 11th Arrondissement. They drove down Avenue Parmentier to Place Léon Blum where they turned onto Boulevard Voltaire.

Two medical interns walking to a nearby restaurant passed the terrorist's vehicle while it was stopped at a red light. One of the occupants stared at them and shouted, "Tonight the Islamic State has come to slit your throats!" He then added, "This is no joke!"

There, they drove down the street before turning right to rue de Charonne and looked for targets. Eventually, they spotted their target, the restaurant La Belle Équipe, and they made a U-turn at the intersection between rue de Charonne and rue Charrière in front of the restaurant Le Petit Baïona, and drove up to La Belle Équipe before stopping the vehicle.

At 21:36, the assailants arrived at the restaurant La Belle Équipe on the rue de Charonne in the 11th arrondissement. They fired for several minutes at the outdoor terrace, much longer than the other shootings, likely trying to expend the rest of their ammunition. After firing for approximately two minutes, one gunman expended an entire magazine on full-auto before the assailants fled in their vehicle.

Jean-Luc Wertenschlag's first photo, showing Brahim Abdeslam in blue jeans, and Abdelhamid Abaaoud returning to the vehicle with red sneakers.

By the time the operation ended at 00:46, nineteen people were killed and seventeen people were injured. Of the injured, twelve were in critical condition and five in serious condition. A further two people died in hospital, bringing the death toll to twenty-one. At La Belle Équipe, Hodda Saadi was celebrating her 35th birthday, and was killed. Her sister, and nine others attending her birthday, were also killed. The 3 terrorists fired 164 rounds; 55, 37, and 72 rounds respectively.

The shooting at La Belle Équipe was caught extensively on film; A ride-share driver named Ahmed captured dashcam footage of the attack, with automatic gunfire audible on the footage. A resident on Rue Godefroy-Cavaignac recorded the latter part of the attack on a smartphone, while Jean-Luc Wertenschlag took two photographs from his apartment near its end.

At 21:40, Brahim Abdeslam was dropped off at the boulevard Voltaire in the 11th arrondissement, near the place de la Nation. He sat down at the interior terrace of the Comptoir Voltaire café, wearing a hooded jacket over several layers of clothing. After placing an order, he smiled at patrons and apologised for interrupting their dinner. Finally, he detonated his explosive vest, killing himself and injuring fifteen people, one of them seriously.

=== Bataclan theatre massacre ===
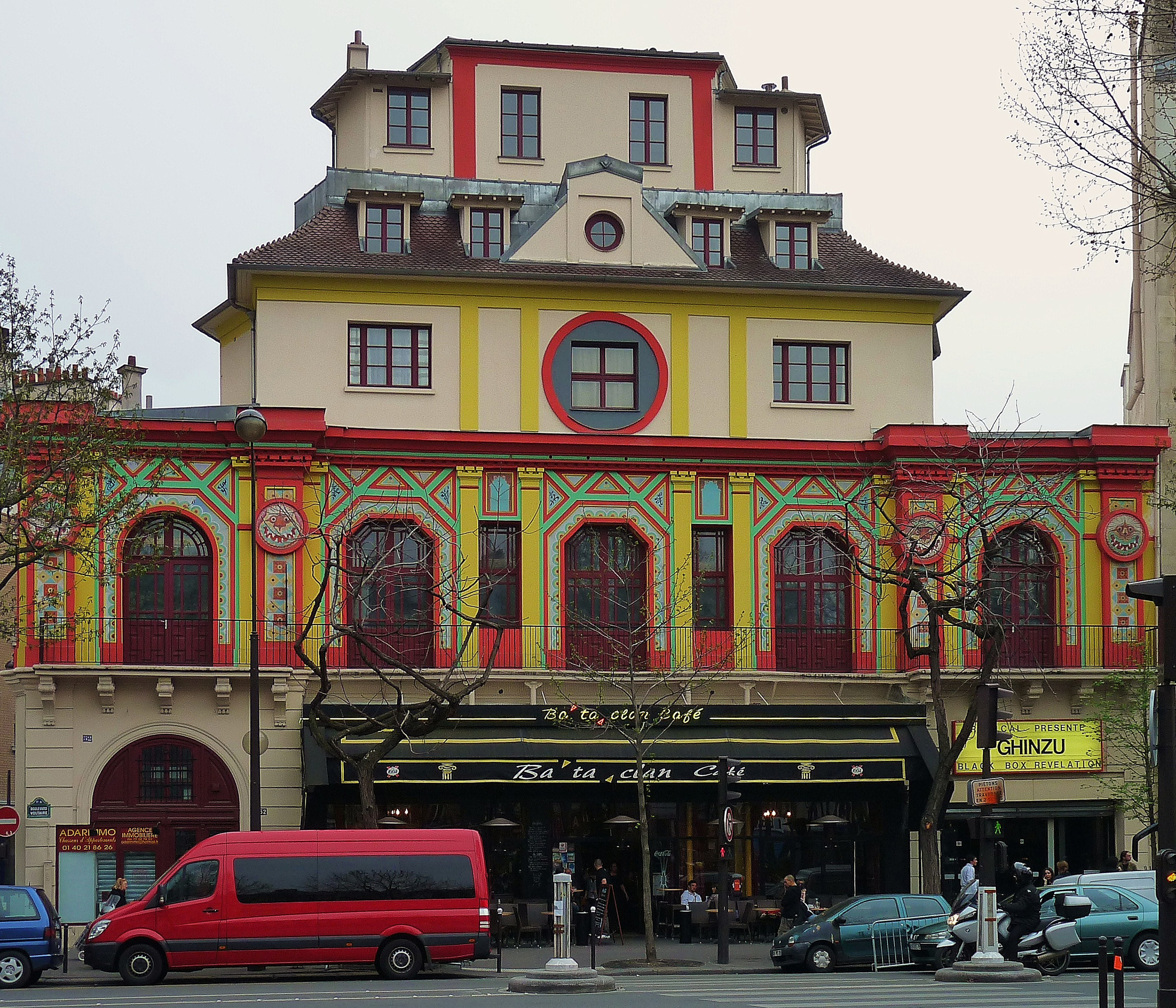
The Bataclan theatre in 2009

Beginning at around 21:50, a mass shooting and hostage-taking occurred at the Bataclan theatre on the boulevard Voltaire in the 11th arrondissement. The American rock band Eagles of Death Metal were playing to an audience of about 1,500 people.

Three dark-clad gunmen armed with three different types of assault rifles (Zastava M70, Norinco Type 56-1, and an AKKS-47 rifle) had been waiting in a black rental car near the venue for more than an hour. The terrorists were three French natives of Algerian descent: Foued Mohamed-Aggad, age 23; Ismaël Omar Mostefaï, age 29; and Samy Amimour, age 28. As the band was playing their song "Kiss the Devil", the three men got out of the car and opened fire on people outside the venue, killing three. Then, they burst into the concert hall and opened fire on the crowd. Witnesses heard shouts of "Allahu Akbar" as the terrorists opened fire. Initially, the audience mistook the gunfire for pyrotechnics. The band ran offstage and escaped with many of the crew.

Rows of people were mowed down by gunfire or were forced to drop to the ground to avoid being shot. Survivors described hundreds of people lying beside and on top of each other in pools of blood, screaming in terror and pain. The gunmen also fired up into the balconies, and dead bodies fell down onto the stalls below. For a few minutes, the hall was plunged into darkness, with only the flashes from the assault rifles as the gunmen kept shooting. The terrorists shouted that they were there because of the French airstrikes against Islamic State. Another witness who was inside the Bataclan heard a gunman say, "This is because of all the harm done by Hollande to Muslims all over the world."

A radio reporter attending the concert described the terrorists as calm and determined and said they reloaded three or four times. Two gunmen attacked the concert hall; one gunman provided covering fire while others reloaded, to ensure maximum efficiency. Whenever the gunmen stopped to reload, some of the crowd ran for the emergency exits, scrambling over each other to escape. Some were shot from behind as they fled, and the terrorists laughed as they shot them. Those who reached the emergency exit were shot by the third gunman, who positioned himself there. Other groups of people barricaded themselves in backstage rooms. Some smashed open the ceiling in an upstairs toilet and hid among the rafters under the roof. Those who could not run lay still on the floor pretending to be dead. According to survivors, the terrorists walked among those who were lying down, kicked them, and shot them in the head if there was any sign of life. An eyewitness reported hearing the gunmen ask amongst themselves where the members of the Eagles of Death Metal were once the gunfire stopped. Mohamed-Aggad and Mostefaï then went upstairs to the balconies, while Amimour stayed downstairs and fired at people who tried to flee.

Police Commissioner Guillaume Cardy, then deputy head of the nighttime anti-crime brigade responsible for the Paris area (BAC 75N, Brigade Anticriminalité 75 Nuit), and his driver, a sergeant, were the first to arrive on the scene at 21:50, barely ten minutes after the shooting began. They saw spectators flee the concert hall in panic and heard gunshots and screams. Understanding that people were still trapped inside with the terrorists, they decided to enter the concert hall from the front doors, armed only with their service 9mm pistol and equipped with light body armor. From the entrance, they saw Samy Amimour holding a hostage at gunpoint on one side of the stage. They shot him six times at 21:57. As he fell to the ground, the terrorist detonated his explosives, while his hostage managed to escape. Mohamed-Aggad and Mostefaï then fired upon the officers from the balconies, forcing them to take cover behind the auditorium's pillars. After a few minutes, the two policemen decided to exit the concert hall to see if backup had arrived. The Search and Intervention Brigade (BRI) arrived on the scene at 22:15, soon followed by the elite RAID tactical unit.

From this point, Mohamed-Aggad and Mostefaï took about twenty hostages and herded them into a room at the end of an L-shaped corridor located further in the building. They also seized the hostages' mobile phones and attempted to use them to access the Internet, but they were unable to find a signal. Some of the hostages were forced to look down into the hall and out the windows and tell the terrorists what they saw. During this time, Mohamed-Aggad and Mostefaï fired on police and other first responders arriving at the scene.

At 23:30, an elite police squad entered the building. One unit evacuated survivors from downstairs, while another unit went upstairs. They found Mohamed-Aggad and Mostefaï, who had begun using hostages as human shields. They shouted the phone number of one of the hostages to police, and over the next 50 minutes had four phone exchanges with a police negotiator. During negotiations, they threatened to execute hostages unless they received a signed paper promising France's departure from Muslim lands. The police assault began at 00:20 and lasted three minutes. Just before, Mohamed-Aggad and Mostefaï took some of the hostages with them to the stairwell at the other end of the L-shaped corridor while leaving most of the hostages between them and the police. Police launched the assault because of reports that Mohamed-Aggad and Mostefaï had started killing hostages. Police using shields burst open the door to the room and exchanged fire with Mohamed-Aggad and Mostefaï while managing to pull the hostages one-by-one behind their shields. Mohamed-Aggad fired from the top of the stairs while Mostefaï stayed with the remaining hostages in the middle of the stairs. During the police assault, most of the remaining hostages staying with Mostefaï took advantage of the chaos to run away from him. Mohamed-Aggad eventually dropped his rifle and detonated his explosive vest. Upon seeing his partner getting ready to detonate the explosive vest, Mostefaï tried running down the stairs. The explosion bisected Mohamed-Aggad's body and fatally wounded Mostefaï. Police shot Mostefaï several times when he started writhing in order to prevent him from detonating his explosive vest.

Ninety people were killed, and hundreds of others were wounded. Almost all of the deceased victims were killed within the first 20 minutes of the attack. All of the hostages were rescued without injury. Police dog teams from the Brigade Cynophile assisted with body removal because of concerns that there could still be live explosives in the theatre. Identification and removal of the bodies took 10 hours, a process made difficult because some audience members had left their identity papers in the theatre's cloakroom.

== Perpetrators ==
Three groups, comprising three men each, executed the attacks. They wore explosive vests and belts with identical detonators. Seven perpetrators died at the scenes of their attacks. The other two were killed five days later during the Saint-Denis police raid. The tenth participant, Salah Abdeslam, drove the Stade de France bombers to the stadium. He was supposed to execute a suicide bombing in the 18th arrondissement after dropping off the group, but he never did and disposed of his explosive vest.

On 14 November, ISIL claimed responsibility for the attacks. François Hollande said ISIL organised the attacks with help from inside France. Claimed motives were an ideological objection to Paris as a capital of abomination and perversion, retaliation for airstrikes on ISIL in Syria and Iraq, and the foreign policy of Hollande in relation to Muslims worldwide. Shortly after the attacks, ISIL's media organ, the Al-Hayat Media Group, launched a website on the dark web extolling the organisation and recommending the encrypted instant messaging service Telegram.

Fabien Clain released an audio recording the day after the attacks in which he personally claimed responsibility for the attacks. Clain is known to intelligence services as a veteran jihadist belonging to ISIL, and of French nationality.

Syrian and Egyptian passports were found near the bodies of two of the perpetrators at two attack sites, but Egyptian authorities said the passport belonged to a victim, Aleed Abdel-Razzak, and not one of the perpetrators. By 16 November, the focus of the French and Belgian investigation turned to Abdelhamid Abaaoud, the radical jihadist they believed was the leader of the plot. Abaaoud had escaped to Syria after having been suspected in other plots in Belgium and France, including the 2015 Thalys train attack. Abaaoud had recruited an extensive network of accomplices, including two brothers, Brahim Abdeslam and Salah Abdeslam, to execute terrorist attacks; Abaaoud was killed in the Saint-Denis raid on 18 November.

Most of the Paris attackers were French- and Belgian-born citizens of Moroccan and Algerian backgrounds who crossed borders without difficulty, albeit registered as terrorism suspects. Two other attackers were Iraqi. According to the French prime minister, Manuel Valls, several of the perpetrators had exploited Europe's immigration crisis to enter the continent undetected. At least some, including the alleged leader Abdelhamid Abaaoud, had visited Syria and returned radicalised. Jean-Charles Brisard, a French expert on terrorism, called this a change of paradigm, in that returning European citizens were themselves the attackers. The Los Angeles Times reported that more than 3,000 Europeans have traveled to Syria and joined ISIL and other radical groups.

On 30 August 2016, jihadist Abu Mohammad al-Adnani was killed by an American missile and DGSI declared that his death marked the end of the terrorist who had supervised the attacks on Brussels and Paris.

=== Search for accomplices ===
Three cars were recovered in Paris after the attacks:

1. A grey Volkswagen Polo with Belgian licence plates abandoned near the Bataclan was hired by a French citizen living in Belgium and contained a parking ticket from the town of Molenbeek.
2. A SEAT was found in the Paris suburb of Montreuil on 15 November and contained three Zastava M70 assault rifles, ammunition, and three butcher knives.
3. A Renault Clio hired by Salah Abdeslam was discovered near Montmartre on 11 November and contained a butcher knife.

Police described Salah, a 26-year-old Belgian citizen, as dangerous, and warned the public not to approach him. He was arrested on 18 March 2016 during an anti-terrorist raid in the Molenbeek area of Brussels (see below). His brother, Brahim, died in the attacks. Another brother, Mohamed, was detained on 14 November in the Molenbeek area of Brussels and released after several hours of questioning. Mohamed said he did not suspect his siblings of planning anything.

On 14 November, a car was stopped at the Belgium-France border and its three occupants were questioned then released. Three more people were arrested in Molenbeek. Links to the attacks were investigated in an arrest in Germany on 5 November, when police stopped a 51-year-old man from Montenegro and found automatic handguns, hand grenades and explosives in his car.

On 15–16 November, French tactical police units raided over 200 locations in France, arresting 23 people and seizing weapons. Another 104 people were placed under house arrest.

On 17 November, police followed a female cousin of the attacker and ringleader, Abdelhamid Abaaoud, to a block of flats in Saint-Denis where they saw Abaaoud with her. The next day, police raided the flat in Saint-Denis, and Abaaoud was killed in the ensuing gunfight, which lasted several hours. Chakib Akrouh, one of the perpetrators of the restaurant shootings, also died during the raid after detonating an explosive vest. Eight suspected militants were arrested at or near the flat.

On 23 November, an explosive belt was found in a litter bin in the Paris suburb of Montrouge. It may have been discarded by Salah Abdeslam, whose phone records showed that he was in Montrouge on the night of the attacks.

On 24 November, five people in Belgium were charged on suspicion of their involvement in the Paris attacks, and Belgian prosecutors issued an arrest warrant for Mohamed Abrini, a 30-year-old suspected accomplice of Salah Abdeslam. Abrini was subsequently reported to have been arrested on 8 April 2016. He is also suspected of having been involved in the 2016 Brussels bombings.

On 9 December, two ISIL militants accompanying two of the Paris attackers into Europe, all masquerading as migrants, were arrested in Greece weeks before the attacks. In July 2016, a third militant involved was also arrested despite regular activity on Facebook from Belgium. The three militants were part of a unit intended to carry out further attacks on 13 November, but their plans were apparently disrupted by the first two arrests.

Fabien Clain was identified as the person reading the ISIL claim of responsibility. Clain was a French national who served 5 years from 2009 to 2014 in a French prison for recruiting fighters to go to Syria for jihad. Clain has been linked to other executed and planned terror attacks and is seen as a leader of known terrorists.

Jawad Bendaoud was arrested 18 November 2015 for "criminal terrorist association for the purpose of committing violent action", as he provided lodging for Abaaoud, Hasna Aït Boulahcen, and a third man. In September 2017, the prosecuting judge filed for Bendaoud's trial for "concealment of terrorist criminals", a charge with a maximum penalty of six years.

=== Analysis of tactics ===
Michael Leiter, former director of the United States National Counterterrorism Center, said the attacks demonstrated a sophistication not seen in a city attack since the 2008 Mumbai attacks and that it would change how the West regarded the threat. Further comparisons were made between the Paris and Mumbai attacks. Mumbai Police Joint Commissioner (Law and Order) Deven Bharti pointed out the similarities as having several targets, shooting indiscriminately, and the use of improvised explosive devices. According to Bharti, one key difference was that the Mumbai attacks lasted several days, and the Paris attackers killed themselves as soon as capture seemed imminent. Evidence points to the attackers having regularly used unencrypted communications during the planning of the attack.

== Casualties ==
Deaths by citizenship
Citizenship	Deaths
France	113
Chile	3
Algeria	2
Belgium	2
Egypt	2
Portugal	2
Germany	2
Romania	2
Tunisia	2
Italy	1
Mexico	1
Morocco	1
Spain	1
Sweden	1
United Kingdom	1
United States	1
Venezuela	1
Total	138

The attackers killed 130 victims and injured 416, with 80 to 99 taken to the hospital in serious condition. While the figure of 416 injured accounts for those with direct physical trauma, a further 459 were admitted to Parisian hospitals for injuries such as severe psychological trauma, shock and secondary injuries sustained during flight. Of the dead, 90 died at the Bataclan theatre, 21 at La Belle Équipe, 13 at Le Carillon and Le Petit Cambodge, five at Café Bonne Bière and La Casa Nostra, and one at Stade de France.

Among those who died at the Bataclan were a music critic of Les Inrockuptibles, an executive of Mercury Records France, and the merchandise manager of Eagles of Death Metal, the band that was performing. Some people suffered from posttraumatic stress disorder (PTSD), including a man who died by suicide two years after the attacks. In May 2024, survivor and graphic novelist Fred Dewilde died by suicide after nine years, during which he depicted his trauma in several graphic novels.

== Legal proceedings ==
On 8 September 2021, the trial of 20 men accused of planning and carrying out the attacks began in Paris in a custom-designed chamber within the Palais de Justice. The trial was expected to hear the testimony of over 300 witnesses and victims, including more than 300 lawyers, and was expected to last about nine months. The trial was filmed, however the film will not be released until fifty years after the conclusion of the trial. Of the 20 accused, fourteen were tried in person and six were tried in absentia. The trial concluded on 29 June 2022 with the conviction of all 20 defendants. Salah Abdeslam, the only surviving assailant in the attacks, received a sentence of life without parole. Of Abdeslam's 19 co-defendants, who were suspected of offering mostly logistical support or plotting other attacks, 18 were convicted on terrorism related charges, while one was convicted of a lesser fraud charge.

In January 2022, an orthopaedic surgeon at the Georges Pompidou hospital was sued and faces possible misconduct charges after using a survivor's X-ray as a NFT (non-fungible token), without consulting her prior. The image was an X-ray of the survivor's forearm with a Kalashnikov bullet near the bone, and was listed as an X-ray of a survivor who had lost her boyfriend in the attack.

== Responses ==
=== Local ===
The hashtag #portesouvertes ("open doors") was used by Parisians to offer shelter to those afraid to travel home after the attacks.

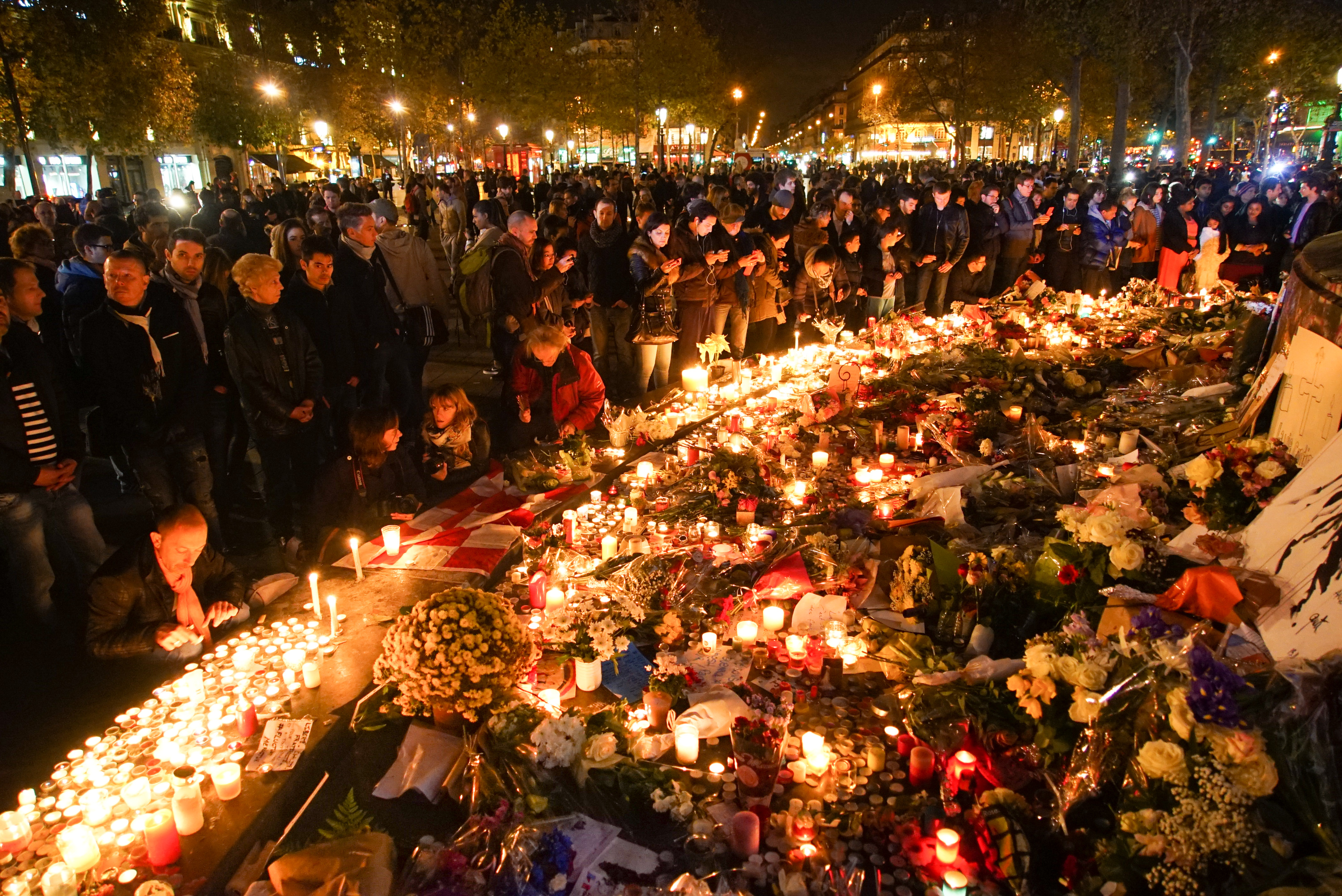
Civil service in remembrance of the attacks victims at the Place de la République on 15 November 2015

As had been the case in January after the Charlie Hebdo attacks, the Place de la République became a focal point of mourning, memorial, and tributes. An impromptu memorial also developed near the Bataclan theatre. On 15 November, two days after the attacks, a memorial service was held at Notre Dame Cathedral, presided over by the Archbishop of Paris, Cardinal André Vingt-Trois, with several political and religious figures in attendance.

Muslim organisations in France, such as the Union of Islamic Organisations of France, strongly condemned the attacks in Paris. The attacks affected business at high-profile venues and shopping centres in Paris, and many Parisians were concerned the attacks might lead to a marginalisation of Muslims in the city. There was not the same call for solidarity with Islam, as in January, following the attacks. Sales of the French flag, which the French had rarely displayed prior to the attacks, increased dramatically after the attacks.

On 4 December, the Bonne Bière café reopened, adorned by a banner with the defiant slogan "Je suis en terrasse" ("I'm on the Terrace"). A street cleaner told France 24 that the city had removed six truckloads of wilted flowers and several kilograms of candles from memorials placed around this and the other shooting scenes: "We didn't really want to get rid of things, but it feels a bit like a cemetery with all the flowers."

=== National ===
==== Government ====
President Hollande issued a statement asking the French people to remain strong in the face of the attacks. He also visited the Bataclan theatre and vowed to "mercilessly" fight against terrorism. Hollande chaired an emergency meeting of the French Cabinet that night and directed his national security council to meet the next morning. The authorities urged the residents of Paris to stay indoors for their own safety and declared a state of emergency. Hollande canceled his trip to the 2015 G-20 Antalya summit because of the attacks, instead sending Foreign Minister Laurent Fabius and Finance Minister Michel Sapin as his representatives. On 14 November, Hollande announced three days of national mourning. On 16 November, Hollande convened a special Congress of the French Parliament to address the attack and lay out legislative and diplomatic plans he wanted to take in response to them. These proposals included an extension of the state of emergency for three months, changes to the French constitution, one of which would have enabled France to protect itself from dual citizens who might pose a risk, and an increase in military attacks against ISIL.

On 4 December 2015, the French government published a guide in the form of a cartoon on how to survive a terrorist attack. The guide is to be posted in public places and be available online.

In July 2016, the French government published the report of a commission of inquiry, presided over by Georges Fenech, into possible security failings relating to the 2015 terrorist attacks in Paris. The report recommended the establishment of a single "national anti-terrorism agency".

In August 2016, Minister of the Interior Bernard Cazeneuve stated that about 20 radicalised mosques and more than 80 hate preachers had been expelled from France since 2012.

==== Military ====
On 15 November, the French Air Force launched the biggest airstrike of Opération Chammal, its bombing campaign against ISIL, sending 10 aircraft to drop 20 bombs on Raqqa, the city where ISIL was based. On 16 November, the French Air Force carried out more airstrikes on ISIL targets in Raqqa, including a command centre and a training camp. On 18 November 2015, French aircraft carrier Charles de Gaulle left its home port of Toulon heading towards the eastern Mediterranean to support bombing operations carried out by the international coalition. This decision was taken before the November attacks but was accelerated by the events.

French authorities regularly gave detailed information to US authorities on the whereabouts of high-ranking IS members in the Syria-Iraq zone to be tracked and killed. This cooperation enabled American air strikes that killed the planners of the 13 November 2015 attacks.

==== Public ====
Applications to join the French Army, which were around 100-150 per day in 2014, rose to 1,500 in the week following the attacks, higher than the rise to 400 after the Charlie Hebdo shooting in January.

==== Domestic politics ====
All major political parties, including Hollande's governing Socialist Party, Marine Le Pen's National Front, and Nicolas Sarkozy's Republicans temporarily suspended their election campaigns for the upcoming French regional elections. There was a nationwide minute of silence at noon which President Hollande and several ministers observed at a ceremony at the Paris Sorbonne University.

On 18 November, Hollande reaffirmed France's commitment to accept 30,000 Syrian refugees over the next two years. This was despite the doubts that the terror attack had sown in people's minds. His announcement drew a standing ovation from a gathering of French mayors.

However, in the election campaign for the regional elections of France, to begin on 6 December 2015, Marine Le Pen, leader of the far-right Front National party who was vying to be president of the Nord-Pas de Calais area, was recommending hardline security measures. She was getting a great deal of media attention with her strong anti-immigrant stance and may have been helping to sway public opinion across France. "The influx of migrants must be stopped," Le Pen told the CBC in an interview. Le Pen was doing well in opinion polls as of early December 2015. Since the elections would start only weeks after the Paris attacks, she was thought to be getting dividends from the timing, when the fear of terrorism was still very strong.

=== European Union ===
Jean-Claude Juncker, president of the European Commission, rejected calls to rethink the European Union's policy on migration. Dismissing suggestions that open borders led to the attacks, Juncker said he believed that the attacks should be met with a stronger display of liberal values, including internal open borders. European Commission vice-president Federica Mogherini and EU defence ministers unanimously backed France's request for help in military missions.

The United Kingdom has stated its intent to help France with operations in Syria, while some countries intend to aid France by taking over activities in Africa. Germany announced sending troops to Mali and military trainers to Kurdish forces in Iraq, and on 4 December voted in favour of deploying aircraft and a frigate in an effort to aid the French forces over Syria.

The attacks prompted European officials to re-evaluate their stance on EU policy toward migrants, especially in light of the ongoing European migrant crisis. Many German officials believed a higher level of scrutiny was needed, and criticised German chancellor Angela Merkel, while the German vice-chancellor Sigmar Gabriel defended her.

French interior minister Bernard Cazeneuve said that he would meet with EU ministers to discuss how to deal with terrorism across the European Union. Meeting reports indicated that Schengen area border controls have been tightened for EU citizens entering or leaving, with passport checks and systematic screening against biometric databases.

Poland's European affairs minister designate Konrad Szymański declared that he saw no possibility of enacting the recent EU refugee relocation scheme. The new prime minister of Poland, Beata Szydło, said she would ask the EU to change its decision on refugee quotas. Szydło said Poland would honour the commitment made by the previous government to accommodate 9,000 refugees.

Hungary's prime minister, Viktor Orbán, rejected the concept of mandatory resettlement quotas.

Czech prime minister Bohuslav Sobotka criticised President Miloš Zeman for supporting anti-Islamic groups and spreading hatred, according to Reuters, whose report added that the Sobotka government had been deporting migrants.

=== Intelligence review ===
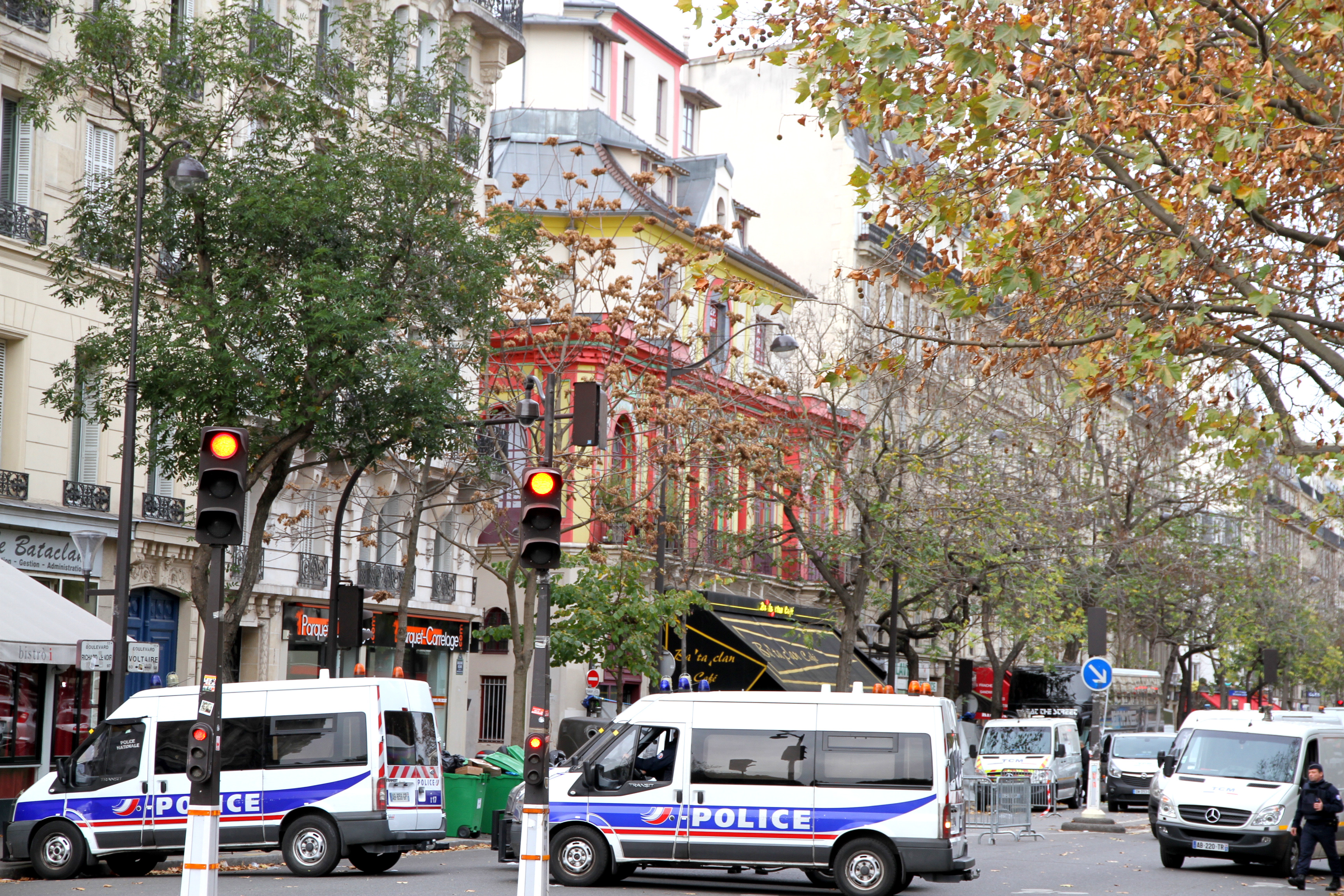
French police gathering evidence at the Bataclan theatre on 14 November

Shortly after the attacks, intelligence staff in multiple countries began to review electronic surveillance recorded before the attacks. Adam Schiff, the ranking Democratic member of the United States House Permanent Select Committee on Intelligence, said he did not know of any intercepted communications that would have provided any warning of the attacks.

One source said the French National Police met with German police and intelligence services a month before the attack to discuss suspicions that terrorists were staking out possible targets in France. The exact targets were not known at that time.

Police in Germany stopped a car on 5 November, arrested its driver, and confiscated weapons that may have been connected to the Paris attacks.

Some of the attackers were known to law enforcement officials prior to the attacks, and at least some of the attackers lived in the Molenbeek area of Brussels, which is noted for its links to extremist activities. A counter-terrorism expert said the fact that the perpetrators were known to authorities suggested that intelligence was "pretty good" but the ability to act on it was lacking. The number of Europeans who have links to Syria makes it difficult for security services to keep track of them all.

On 26 December 2015, "Belgian newspaper De Morgen reported that a police oversight body, known as Committee P," is investigating why prior warnings from a school about the radicalisation of one of the attackers, Bilal Hadfi, were not reported to Belgian law enforcement.

On 8 March 2021, Italian police arrested a 36-year-old Algerian man on suspicion of helping authors of the Paris attacks and for belonging to the Islamic State group. It was reported that he had "guaranteed the availability of forged documents" to the Paris attackers.

== Security changes ==
=== In France ===
In response to the attacks, France was put under an état d'urgence (state of emergency) for the first time since the 2005 riots, borders were temporarily closed, and 1,500 soldiers were called in to help the police maintain order in Paris. The plan blanc (Île de France) and plan rouge (global), two contingency plans for times of emergency, were immediately activated.

Flights to and from Charles de Gaulle Airport and Orly Airport were mostly unaffected. American Airlines delayed flights to Paris until further notice. Many Paris Metro stations in the 10th and 11th arrondissements were shut down because of the attacks. Uber suspended car hails in Paris after the attacks.

All state schools and universities in Paris remained closed the next day. Sports events in France for the weekend of 14 to 15 November were postponed or canceled. Disneyland Paris, which had operated every day since opening in 1992, closed its parks as a mark of respect for those who died in the attacks. The Eiffel Tower, a Paris landmark visited by 20,000 people a day, was closed for two days. Other venues that were to remain closed included shops and cinemas. Protests were banned until 19 November, while bands such as U2, Foo Fighters, Motörhead, and Coldplay cancelled performances in Paris.

The week after 20 November, Hollande was planning to travel to the US and Russia to discuss greater international co-operation against ISIL.

==== State of emergency ====
On 13 November, President Hollande declared a state of emergency.

On 20 November, the Senate in France agreed to extend the current state of emergency by three months; this measure gave police extra powers of detention and arrest intended to increase security, at the expense of some personal liberties. Public demonstrations of environmental activists during COP21, held in Paris from 30 November to 12 December 2015, were prevented from happening under the state of emergency regulations, while others were allowed.

The state of emergency was extended until the end of July 2016. Further extensions followed after the attack in Nice on 14 July 2016.

=== Belgium ===
Belgium immediately on 13 November tightened security along its border with France and increased security checks for people arriving from France.

Starting on 21 November 2015, the government of Belgium imposed a security lockdown on Brussels, including the closure of shops, schools, public transportation, due to information about potential terrorist attacks in the wake of the series of coordinated attacks in Paris. One of the perpetrators of the attack, Belgian-born French national Salah Abdeslam, was thought to be hiding in the city. As a result of warnings of a serious and imminent threat, the terror alert level was raised to the highest level (four) across the Brussels metropolitan area, and people were advised not to congregate publicly, effectively putting the city under lockdown.

=== International ===
Cities in the United States took security precautions, especially at sites where large crowds were expected, as well as sports events, concerts, the French embassy and other French government sites. William J. Bratton, the New York City Police Commissioner, said the Paris attacks have changed the way law enforcement deals with security. Singapore raised its national security alert level, stepping up border checks and security across the city-state. Police and military authorities in Manila were placed on full alert in preparation for the APEC Economic Leaders' Meeting.

== International reactions ==
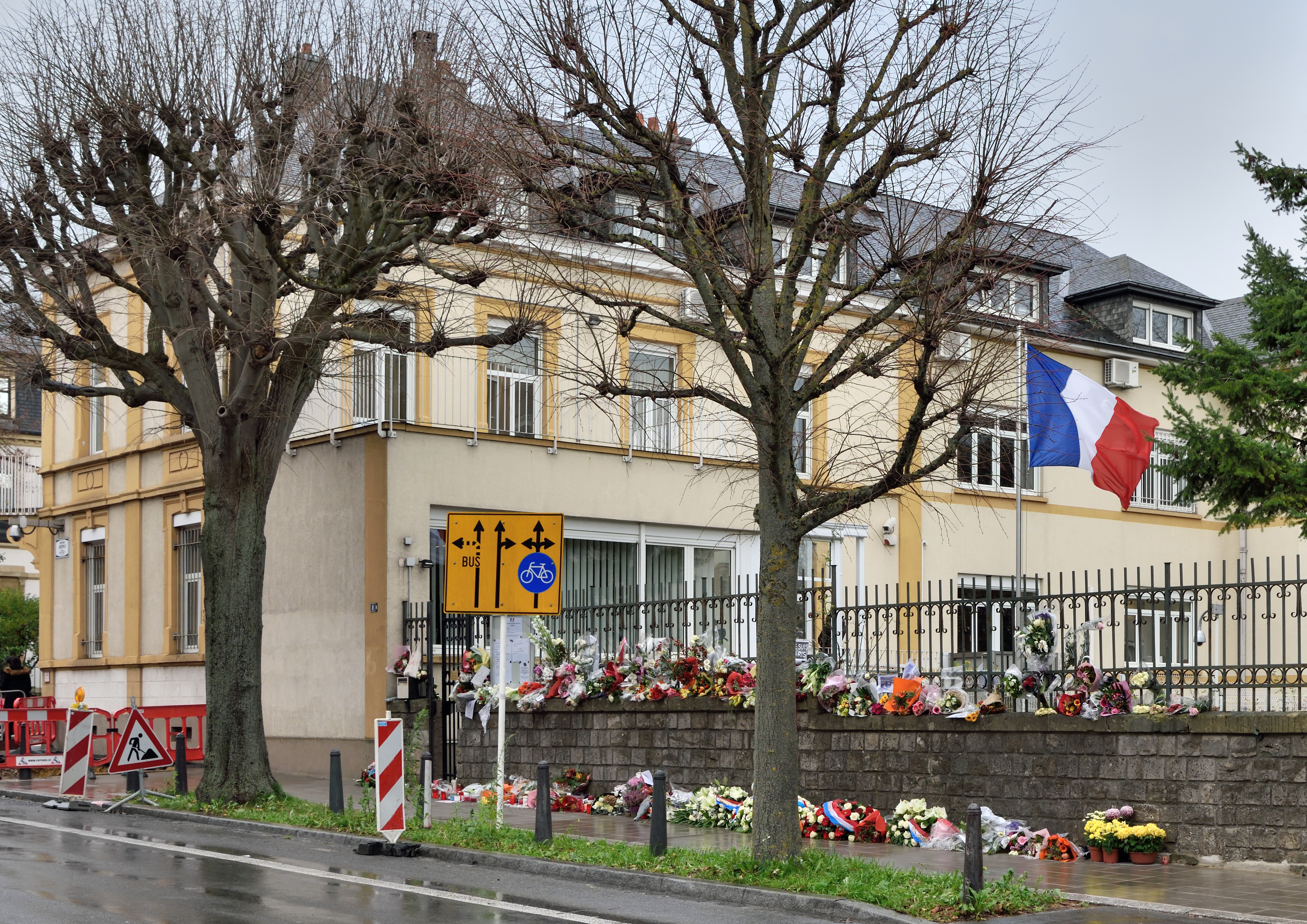
Flower tributes outside the French Embassy in Luxembourg City

Many heads of state and heads of government, as well as the United Nations, offered messages of condolence and solidarity in the wake of the attacks.

In response to the attacks, the U.S. House of Representatives passed a bill that made it more difficult for Syrian and Iraqi refugees to enter the United States. At least 31 governors of U.S. states declared they would refuse to accept Syrian refugees.

=== Muslim officials and groups ===
Muslim heads of state, scholars, imams, leaders and groups condemned the attacks, many before ISIL claimed responsibility. These included the imam who heads the university of Al-Azhar in Egypt, the Supreme council of Religious Scholars in Saudi Arabia, Iranian president Hassan Rouhani and the Ahmadiyya caliph Mirza Masroor Ahmad.

Syrian president Bashar al-Assad condemned the attacks, but added that France's support for Syrian rebel groups had contributed to the spread of terrorism. France had been a particularly vocal opponent of Assad during the Syrian civil war.

Ahrar ash-Sham and Jaysh al-Islam, the major mainstream Islamist rebels against the Syrian regime, both condemned the attacks. Hassan Nasrallah, the leader of Hezbollah, condemned the attacks, and expressed his solidarity with the French people. Other militant groups also condemned the attacks, including Hamas and Islamic Jihad Movement in Palestine.

== Related incidents ==
=== Hanover bombing plot ===
A few days after the attacks, on 17 November, a soccer friendly set to be played at HDI-Arena in Hanover between Germany (who had just been present at the Stade de France during the Paris attacks) and the Netherlands was cancelled and thousands of soccer fans evacuated from the arena following a bomb threat. The match, having been hailed as a "symbol of freedom" after the Paris attacks, was set to be attended in a show of solidarity with France by German chancellor Angela Merkel, vice-chancellor Sigmar Gabriel, several other German government ministers, as well as Dutch defence minister Jeanine Hennis-Plasschaert and health and sport minister Edith Schippers.

According to a French intelligence dossier, five bombs had been prepared to be detonated at or around the stadium by a named five-member terror cell in a series of coordinated bomb attacks. German authorities refused to give more details on findings, with Interior Minister Thomas de Maiziere claiming that "some of these answers would alarm the public." While police claimed to not have found any explosives, German newspapers published allegations of a cover-up, which claimed that a paramedic had witnessed explosives hidden in an ambulance at the stadium, before being told by special forces at the scene "to not talk about it." Another newspaper claimed it had been a truck bomb disguised as an ambulance. Three police officers were disciplined for leaking information about alleged bomb finds.

At the same time also in Hanover, the TUI Arena was evacuated before a concert by the band Söhne Mannheims, and a train station was closed off after a suspicious device was found. Later the same evening, two Air France flights headed from the United States to Paris were diverted to Salt Lake City, Utah and Halifax, Nova Scotia because of bomb threats. The events followed the previous day, when a soccer match set to be played in Brussels between Belgium and Spain had also been cancelled over security concerns.

=== 2016 Brussels raids ===
On 15 March 2016, Belgian police carried out a raid on a house in the suburb of Forest in Brussels. A police statement said that the raid was related to the Paris attacks. Four police officers were wounded in the raid, and a manhunt for escaped suspects followed.

On 18 March 2016, there were further raids in the Molenbeek area of Brussels. Two suspects were reportedly injured in one such raid and a third suspect was killed. Five people, one identified as Salah Abdeslam, suspected accomplice in the Paris attacks, were arrested during the raid.

== Media depictions ==
One of the people who was present in the Bataclan theatre on 13 November 2015 during the terrorist attacks was a French artist who works under the pseudonym Fred Dewilde. In October 2016, he published a graphic novel about his firsthand experience of these tragic events, named Mon Bataclan.

On 27 April 2016, American rock band Pierce the Veil released a song titled "Circles", inspired by the November 2015 Paris terrorist attacks.

On 6 June 2018, Gédéon and Jules Naudet released the documentary November 13: Attack on Paris.

The first episode of the 2019 police procedural series Criminal: France features an investigation into a survivor of the Bataclan attack who is suspected of lying about her experience.

On 5 October 2022, the French film November was released, directed by Cédric Jimenez and starring Jean Dujardin, that depicts the investigations and the interventions of the police (in particular of the anti-terrorist sub-directorate) during the five days which followed the attacks.

Alice Winocour's 2022 feature film Revoir Paris (Paris Memories) looked at the effects of the aftermath of a group of people trapped in an attached bistro and starred Virginie Efira.

A 4-part miniseries named Les Espions de la Terreur was released by M6 in 2024. It shows the aftermath of the November attacks through the eyes of the French Secret Service.

== Legacy ==
In November 2025, ten years after the attacks, a memorial garden dedicated to the victims was inaugurated on Place Saint-Gervais, behind Paris City Hall. The inauguration ceremony was attended by French president Emmanuel Macron. Five months later, the garden was vandalised, with paper trash scattered and ten lanterns knocked over.

== See also ==
- List of Islamist terrorist attacks:
  - 2016 Brussels bombings, another attack by the Brussels ISIL terror cell
  - Manchester Arena bombing, another attack at a music event
  - Crocus City Hall attack, a similar attack in a music event
  - 2016 Nice truck attack
  - 2018 Strasbourg attack
- 2015 in France
- History of Paris
- ISIL-related terror attacks in France
- List of hostage crises
- List of major terrorist incidents
- List of marauding terrorist incidents
- List of terrorist incidents in France
- List of terrorist incidents in November 2015
