= Rue Alibert =

Street in Paris, France

Coordinates: 48.8716°N 2.3675°E

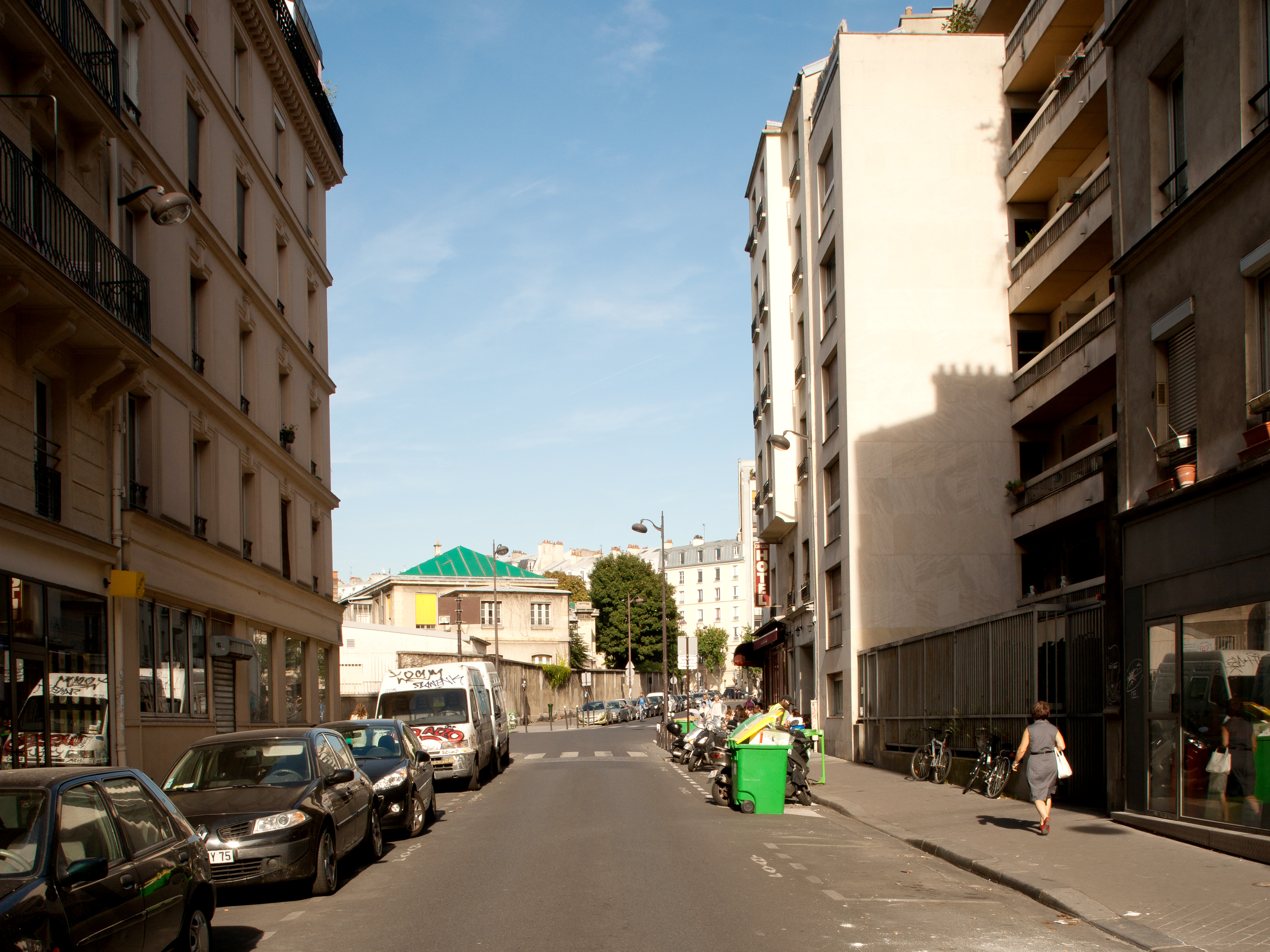
View of the Rue Alibert, with the Hôpital Saint-Louis in the distance

Location of the Rue Alibert in the 10th arrondissement of Paris

The Rue Alibert is a street in the 10th arrondissement of Paris, France. It starts at 66 Quai de Jemmapes and ends at 1 Avenue Claude-Vellefaux and 161 Avenue Parmentier after having served the Rue Bichat and the Rue Marie-Louise. The street extends the Rue Dieu, after crossing the Canal Saint-Martin via the Alibert gateway or via the swing bridge on the Rue Dieu.

== History ==
Initially a minor dead-end street, it had several names: the 'Rue Dagouri' (1740), 'Rue Notre-Dame', 'Ruelle des Postes', and 'Impasse Saint-Louis' because of the proximity of the Hôpital Saint-Louis. A ministerial decision of 28 Vendemiaire year XI (20 October 1802 in the French Republican Calendar) set the minimum width of the street to 10 meters and ordered the street to be extended to the Rue Saint-Maur.

The opening of the laterally-crossing Rue Bichat in 1824 meant that it was no longer a dead-end, and royal order of December 6, 1827 programmed its widening to 15 meters and extension, however, this was ultimately never achieved. The street was renamed the Rue Alibert on January 19, 1840, in homage to Baron Jean-Louis Alibert, assistant physician at the Hôpital Saint-Louis.

On 13 November 2015, it was the site of one of multiple terrorist attacks in Paris, where gunmen opened fire on the Le Carillon bar at no. 18 and the restaurant Le Petit Cambodge at no. 20.
