= Fabien Clain =

French jihadist (1978–2019)

- Born: 30 January 1978; Toulouse, France
- Died: 20 February 2019 (aged 41); Al-Baghuz Fawqani, Syria
- Cause of death: Death by airstrike
- Known for: Toulouse and Montauban shootings
- Spouse: Dorothee Maquere
- Allegiance: Islamic State of Iraq and the Levant
- Capture status: Killed
- Accomplice: Mohammed Merah

Fabien Clain (30 January 1978, Toulouse, France – 20 February 2019, Al-Baghuz Fawqani, Syria) was a purported veteran jihadist terrorist loyal to the Islamic State. He was a French national of Réunionnais origin.

== Personal background ==
Clain converted to Islam in the 1990s. He appears to have been radicalized in the first half of the 2000s, along with his younger brother Jean-Michel Clain, known as Abu Othman Al Faransi.

After living in the Netherlands from 2003, in 2004, the Clain brothers went to Egypt with their wives to study the Koran in the suburbs of Cairo. Clain and friends found themselves in a village to the south of Toulouse, Artigat, around a "guru", Olivier Corel, of Syrian origin. Corel, known as the 'white Emir', served as a "scholar in religion" for the group who met at his home.

Clain reportedly had influence on the group that included brothers, Abdelkader and Mohammed Merah, and Sabri Essid. He created a prayer room in his home and preached hatred against Jews and Americans and urged jihad. On 12 December 2006, two of his followers, Essid and Bala, were intercepted by the Syrian Army on the way to fight American troops in Iraq. After a few months of detention in Syria, they were handed over to France.

== Terrorist involvement ==
=== 2009 conviction ===
Members of this group were charged with terrorist offenses in 2009. Clain was presented as an "organizer" of a group and sentenced to five years in jail. Group members Essid and Bala were also convicted, but Olivier Corel and Abdelkader Merah were acquitted. Clain is banned from twenty-two French departments.

=== Toulouse and Montauban shootings ===
Before the Toulouse and Montauban shootings, Clain was still in French prison in March 2012 when Mohammed Merah killed three soldiers as well as a professor and three children in a Jewish school. The two men corresponded by mail while in prison and Clain was accused of conspiracy in the scooter attack. Clain appears to have gone to Syria after being released from French prison in 2014.

In April 2015, Clain's name came up in the investigation of a planned attack on a church in Villejuif outside Paris. The attack failed when the terrorist shot himself in the leg. At some point before November 2015 Clain uttered threats against Bataclan due to the alleged Zionism of its [former] owners.

Clain released an audio recording on the day after the November 2015 Paris attacks in which he personally claimed responsibility for the attacks. This "is only the beginning of the storm and a warning for those who want to meditate and remove their lessons" (translation of the recording). The voice recording intonation is reported to be not aggressive but soft, rejoicing in the deaths of the 'idolatrous' at the concert hall and other locations.

=== O Disbelievers of the World Nasheed ===
A nasheed by Al-Hayat Media Center released on 31 December 2017 and sung by Jean-Michel Clain shows an apocalyptic view between the Islamic State and the kuffar.

=== Death ===
On 20 February 2019, Fabien was killed in a drone attack during the Battle of Baghuz Fawqani. In a video released in April 2019, he was thanked by Abu Bakr al-Baghdadi for his work. His brother Jean-Michel Clain, who was also wounded in the same 20 February, was killed in Syria by a mortar two days later.
