= Jawad Bendaoud =

French criminal

Jawad Bendaoud (born 30 August 1986) is a French criminal convicted of harboring some of the terrorists involved in the November 2015 Paris attacks, including the mastermind of the attacks, Abdelhamid Abaaoud. Bendaoud was sentenced to four years in prison in March 2019 for harboring Abaaoud and Chakib Akrouh, one of the other terrorists involved in the attacks. Bendaoud had previously been acquitted of the charges in February 2018. In August 2019, he was sentenced to an additional six months in prison for verbally assaulting a prison guard.

Prior to the attacks, Bendaoud already had an extensive criminal history. In 2006 he killed his best friend, David, who tried to break up a fight. Bendaoud was accusing another friend of stealing his cellphone. He was later sentenced to eight years in prison for voluntary manslaughter (out of which he only served six).

At the time of the attacks, Bendaoud was a drug dealer. A few days after the attacks, Bendaoud was contacted by Abaaoud's cousin, Hasna Aitboulahcen, asking for a flat to rent for two people, to which Bendaoud agreed. Aitboulahcen's flatmate contacted the police and the flat was raided on November 18, resulting in Abaaoud, Aitboulahcen and Akrouh all being killed. While the raid was ongoing, Bendaoud was interviewed and insisted he was unaware the people he was renting to were the wanted terrorists and was arrested live on TV.

Bendaoud was acquitted at his first trial in February 2018 on the grounds that there was insufficient evidence that he knew the people he was renting to were terrorists. The Paris prosecutor appealed the court's decision, and Bendaoud was found guilty in a second trial and sentenced to four years in prison in March 2019. In August 2019, he was sentenced to an additional six months in prison for verbally assaulting a prison guard.

Bendaoud has been the subject of numerous internet memes. Bendaoud was widely mocked in France because of his interview where he claimed to have no idea who the men he was renting to were. Following his conviction, a video of Bendaoud leaving court went viral and became known as the "Tough Guy Entrance". The video has been viewed over 170 million times on Twitter alone, the most viewed video on Twitter.
