= Turkey and the Fire of Racism =

Islamic State propaganda film

- Banner ad for Turkey and the Fire of Racism
- Turkish: Türkiye ve Irkçılık Ateşi; Arabic: تركيا ونار القومية
- Music by: Ajnad Media Foundation for Audio Production
- Production company: Al-Hayat Media Center
- Release date: 21 November 2014
- Languages: Turkish and Arabic

Turkey and the Fire of Racism (Turkish: Türkiye ve Irkçılık Ateşi; Arabic: تركيا ونار القومية) is a 17-minute Islamic State propaganda film released on Al-Hayat Media Center in 2015.

== Background ==
Although the Turkey–Islamic State conflict had begun when the Islamic State first came to existence, it was only after a rapid increase of attacks in 2015 when Turkey began treating the Islamic State as a serious enemy. The Islamic State, since the moment they were founded, as according to their Salafi jihadist and Pan-Islamist doctrine, have vowed to dissolve Turkey and include it in their caliphate, with them frequently using the threat of "liberating Istanbul" from Turkish control. The Islamic State has released propaganda directed against Turkey before and after this film, and they have also insulted Mustafa Kemal Atatürk, Recep Tayyip Erdoğan, Necmettin Erbakan, the AKP, and have made takfir on their supporters and called for violence against them.

== Synopsis ==
It started off with a short clip of how Islam spread from the Middle East to Central Asia, and then described how Turks "turned away" from Islam and turned to Sufi-style traditions during the Ottoman Empire, and later to Turkish nationalism under the State of Turkey. It heavily criticized Mustafa Kemal Atatürk, and it went on to criticise Recep Tayyip Erdoğan as a taghut and a murtad. It also targeted the AKP and referred to them as deviant secularists under the guise of Islam. The video also targeted Abdullah Öcalan of the PKK, as well as Idealists (Turkish-Islamic synthesists). In the video, the Turkish-backed FSA and the SDF were targeted too. A Turkish militant in the video referred to the use of any form of wolf symbolism among Turks as "idolatry", and also said that Turanism and Pan-Turkism have ruined the brotherhood between Muslims. The video was all in fluent Istanbul Turkish, except for a short clip of a militant speaking in Kurmanji, who sent a message to Kurds, "especially those living in Turkey." He stated "do you believe you will be freed by the hands of atheists?", referring to secular Kurdish groups. He later said "under the shadow of Sharia, the only thing separating an Arab and a non-Arab alike is their piety."

== See also ==
- Istanbul nightclub shooting
