= Abdelhamid Abaaoud =

Belgian-born terrorist (1987–2015)

- Abaaoud holding the Quran and an Islamic State flag
- Born: 8 April 1987; Anderlecht, Belgium
- Died: 18 November 2015 (aged 28); Saint-Denis, France
- Cause of death: Gunshot wounds
- Other name: Abdel-Hamid Abu Oud
- Known for: Brussels Islamic State terror cell November 2015 Paris attacks
- Status: Killed by police

Details
- Killed: 39 (Note: This figure only includes those killed in the attacks he directly participated in.)
- Injured: 25 (Note: This figure only includes those wounded in the attacks he directly participated in.)
- Military career
- Allegiance: Islamic State
- Conflicts: Syrian Civil War (2014–15)

Abdelhamid Abaaoud (Arabic: عبد الحميد أبا عود, romanized: ʿAbd al-Ḥamīd ʾAbā ʿŪd; 8 April 1987 – 18 November 2015) was a Belgian-born Islamic terrorist who had spent time in Syria and was suspected of having organized multiple terror attacks in Belgium and France, and is known to have masterminded and participated in the November 2015 Paris attacks. Prior to the Paris attacks, there was an international arrest warrant issued for Abaaoud for his activities in recruiting individuals to Islamic terrorism in Syria.

Abaaoud was also known as Abu Omar Soussi (Arabic: أبو عمر السوسي, meaning "Abu Omar the Susian", his Moroccan family's place of origin) and as Abu Omar al-Baljīkī or Abu Umar al-Baljīkī (Arabic: أبو عمر البلجيكي, meaning Abu Omar the Belgian), both of which were noms de guerre.

He died from wounds received during an armed raid conducted by French authorities in the suburb of Saint-Denis in north Paris.

== Early life ==
Abdelhamid, one of six children, was born on 8 April 1987 in Anderlecht, a municipality of Brussels, Belgium. He was the son of Omar Abaaoud, who emigrated to Belgium from Morocco in 1975. Omar Abaaoud's first employment after emigration was in mining, before he was employed as a shopkeeper.

Abaaoud grew up in Molenbeek, an area in Brussels where "the radical Salafi ideology has flourished among some young Muslims." He attended the select Collège Saint-Pierre in Uccle from 1999 to 2000. An article from 2015 said childhood friends claimed Abaaoud had smoked "a lot of cannabis" during his teenage years.

Both Abaaoud and Salah Abdeslam were arrested during December 2010 for attempting to break into a parking garage, according to the lawyer representing Abaaoud. Abaaoud alone had spent time in at least three prisons, and had a number of arrests for assault, and other crimes. The nature of these latter crimes were not disclosed by his lawyer. For a time, sometime prior to 2013, Abdelhamid Abaaoud was involved in trading via employment with his father.

In 2013, he recruited his then 13-year-old brother Younes to join him in Syria. They left for Syria on 19 January 2014, for which he was convicted of abduction, having been previously convicted of robbery. On 24 January 2018 during the trial of Jawad Bendaoud, the president of the court Isabelle Prévost-Desprez announced the death of Younes in an Iraqi-Syrian zone.

== Earlier jihadist activities ==
Abaaoud is reported to have joined a group within ISIL known as al-Battar Katiba, (the al-Battar Battalion) during the fight against Bashar al-Assad in 2013. He returned to Belgium by the end of the same year. In 2014, independent journalists Étienne Huver and Guillaume Lhotellier visited the Syria–Turkey border, where they obtained photos and video of Abaaoud's time in Syria. One portion of this material showed Abaaoud and others loading bloody corpses into a truck and trailer before Abaaoud grinned and told the camera: "Before we towed jet skis, motorcycles, quad bikes, big trailers filled with gifts for vacation in Morocco. Now, thank God, following God's path, we're towing apostates, infidels who are fighting us." Within Syria, Abaaoud is known to have been active at Hraytan. A diary entry while there records: "Admittedly there is no joy in spilling blood, although it's nice to see, from time to time, the blood of the infidels".

Analysis of a telephone call established Abaaoud was in contact with Mehdi Nemmouche during January 2014. Nemmouche, a Franco-Algerian jihadist, shot and killed four people at the Jewish Museum in Brussels on 24 May 2014. Belgian authorities suspect him of having helped to organize and finance a terror cell in Verviers. This cell was raided on 15 January 2015 and two members of the cell were killed. In an interview with Dabiq, the magazine of the Islamic State (IS), Abaaoud bragged on social media about going to Belgium to lead the cell but escaped back to Syria, even being stopped by a police officer who compared him to a photo but did not identify him. In July 2015, following the Verviers raid, he was convicted in absentia and sentenced to twenty years in prison by a Belgian judge for organizing terrorism.

In an interview with Dabiq magazine published February 2015, Abaaoud was reported to have made comments of his intention to fight persons of the Western world which he identifies as "the crusaders".

Abaaoud was put under investigation as a possible link to four out of six attacks foiled in France since spring 2015. This included an attempted attack by Sid Ahmed Ghlam at a church in Villejuif near Paris in April 2015, as well as the thwarted Thalys train attack, which occurred on 21 August 2015.

According to a BBC report on 19 November 2015, after Abaaoud's death, France's Interior Minister Bernard Cazeneuve told reporters that he had received intelligence that Abaaoud passed through Greece on his return from Syria. It is unclear whether he had concealed himself among the thousands of migrants arriving in Greece before heading for other EU nations. Greek officials subsequently insisted that there was no evidence that Abaaoud had been there. Confirming that Abaaoud had left for Syria last year, Cazeneuve said no EU states had signalled his return.

== Paris attacks and death ==
Abaaoud is known to have masterminded and participated in the November 2015 Paris attacks, in which he was one of three, along with Brahim Abdeslam and Chakib Akrouh, who committed the restaurant shootings portion of the attacks. He also directed the attackers at Bataclan theatre through his phone.

By 16 November 2015, French and Belgian security services were focused on Abaaoud, who they believed to have been the leader of the Paris attacks.

On 18 November, French authorities conducted a raid that ended in the injury of five police officers, three deaths, and at least five arrests, although some reports later indicated eight. The raid took place in the suburb of Saint-Denis in north Paris, and targeted Abaaoud. He was later confirmed to be one of the three fatalities in the raid.

The police were aware that Hasna Ait Boulahcen, a suspect in a drug ring investigation during which her telephone was tapped, also of Moroccan origin, was an associate of Abaaoud. They followed her to a Saint-Denis apartment building at 8 Rue Corbillon on 17 November and saw Abaaoud entering with her. This was the building where the subsequent raid started at 4:20 am on 18 November.

The prosecutor's office said that Abaaoud's body was found in the apartment that had been targeted in the raid and that the identification was made using skin samples, according to some published reports. However, other reports referred to identification by fingerprint samples taken from Abaaoud's mutilated body which had been riddled with bullets and bits of shrapnel from a grenade explosion. Abaaoud's fingerprints were found on an AK-47 rifle found in an abandoned car.

According to French Interior Minister Bernard Cazeneuve, Abaaoud had "played a decisive role" in the Paris attacks and played a part in four of six terror attacks foiled since spring of 2015, with one alleged jihadist claiming Abaaoud had trained him personally. The French prosecutor also stated on 24 November that Abaaoud was planning another attack in La Défense, a major business district in the Paris Metropolitan Area. In Britain, West Midlands Police also recovered nearly 50 video clips and digital photographs from his phone. Among the photos were those of the Bull Ring shopping centre in Birmingham and other locations in the city. Abaaoud had visited the United Kingdom in August 2015. He arrived at Dover by ferry despite being hunted by Belgian authorities.

== Connections to other jihadists ==
Abaaoud and Salah Abdeslam were in prison together in Belgium. Abaaoud was apparently connected to Sharia4Belgium.

Abaaoud was thought by counter-terrorism officials to have been close to Abu Bakr al-Bagdadi, and the link between IS leadership in Syria and terror cells operating in Europe. He was also connected to Charaffe al Mouadan, who was based in Syria and a participating member of IS prior to his death on 24 December 2015.

On 5 December, officials confirmed Abaaoud had two connections living in the Bordesley Green and Alum Rock areas of Birmingham, England.

== Bibliography ==
- E. Dearden - Article The Independent 25 May 2017
