= Samy Amimour =

French-Algerian Islamic terrorist (1987–2015)

- Born: October 15, 1987; Paris 14th, France
- Died: November 13, 2015 (aged 28); Bataclan, Paris 11th, France
- Cause of death: Shot by police / suicide by explosive belt
- Known for: November 2015 Paris attacks
- Allegiance: Islamic State

Samy Amimour, known by his nom de guerre Abu Qital al-Faransi (15 October 1987 – 13 November 2015), was a French Islamic terrorist of Algerian origin.

Initially a bus driver for the RATP, he left to join the ranks of the Islamic State in Syria in 2013. Having returned to France, he became one of the three perpetrators, alongside Ismaël Omar Mostefaï and Foued Mohamed-Aggad, of the Bataclan theatre massacre, which caused the deaths of 90 people during the November 2015 Paris attacks, the deadliest terrorist attack perpetrated in France under the Fifth Republic.

== Radicalization ==
Born in 1987 in the 14th arrondissement of Paris, Samy Amimour grew up in Drancy, Seine-Saint-Denis, in a Muslim family described as "very Westernized". Both of his parents were of Algerian origin and lived in Liège, Belgium. Multilingual and fond of French literature, his father left the household during his childhood, but the family remained in contact. His mother, a feminist, was active in a Berber cultural association. His father worked in import-export between France and Belgium.

Holder of a literary baccalauréat (bac L), Samy Amimour successively failed in law at Paris-XIII University and then in a logistics IUT. From December 2010 to February 2011, he completed bus driver training provided by a private company at Paris Charles de Gaulle Airport. On 8 August 2011, the RATP hired him as a "driver-operator" (machiniste-receveur). In practice, for fifteen months he operated the route between Bobigny and Aulnay-sous-Bois (via Drancy) driving bus line 148.

Starting in the summer of 2012, Samy Amimour began adopting the clothing style of Salafi Muslims. On 5 October, he resigned from his position at RATP. On 15 October, he was arrested at his parents' home and placed in custody at the premises of the Central Directorate of Internal Intelligence (DCRI), where he and two other individuals (Samir Bouabout and Charaffe al Mouadan) were interrogated for 96 hours. Since May 2012, the Paris prosecutor's office had suspected the trio of intending to travel to Yemen or the Pakistan-Afghanistan border region to fight. To this end, Amimour and al Mouadan, who was killed in a US drone strike on 24 December 2015 in Raqqa, had begun taking shooting lessons at the National Police Shooting Association in the 18th arrondissement of Paris. Released, Amimour was nevertheless placed under judicial supervision by anti-terrorist judge Marc Trévidic. A few months later, he met his future wife, Kahina El Hadra, nine years his junior. The two remained in contact via the internet.

== Departure to Middle East ==
In September 2013, he left France to join the ranks of the Islamic State of Iraq and the Levant in Syria via Turkey. Turkish secret services spotted him on 6 September 2013 alongside Ismaël Omar Mostefaï, one of the three Bataclan terrorists, and Samir Bouabout, with whom he had prepared a failed departure for jihad in 2012. From there, he crossed the border into Syria, joined ISIL, and took the kunya of Abu Hajia. An international arrest warrant was issued for him by France. In January 2014, he was wounded in the leg by a shell near Aleppo during clashes against rebels. Unfit for combat, he settled in Al-Shaddadah. His father briefly visited him on 29 June 2014 in Syria, hoping to persuade him to leave the ranks of ISIL, but without success. On 15 October 2014, he was joined in Syria by Kahina El Hadra, a young woman met in Drancy, whom he married. The couple then relocated to Mosul in Iraq.

== Participation in the 13 November attacks ==
Samy Amimour managed to return to France undetected by authorities.

On 13 November 2015, alongside Ismaël Omar Mostefaï and Foued Mohamed-Aggad, he took part in the Bataclan massacre, one of three series of attacks targeting the Île-de-France region that day. The three men, armed with Kalashnikov rifles and suicide belts, began their attack at 9:40 pm. They opened fire on the audience of the concert being performed by Eagles of Death Metal. The attack lasted several hours, resulting in the death of 90 spectators.

Amimour was the first terrorist to be neutralized by law enforcement. Commissioner Guillaume Cardy, deputy head of the Paris night anti-crime brigade (BAC 75N), and his driver, who entered the Bataclan after being alerted by radio of the ongoing attack, spotted Samy Amimour on the ground floor of the performance hall, about twenty meters from their position, to the left of the stage, at 9:57 pm. He was holding a hostage at gunpoint, hands on his head, ordering him to lie on the floor. Samy Amimour spotted the commissioner and shouted "Get out! Get out asshole!" (« Casse-toi ! Casse-toi enfoiré ! ») before the commissioner fired four times. On the third or fourth shot, his driver also opened fire once. Samy Amimour then fell onto his back, allowing the hostage to escape. Once on the ground, the terrorist slightly raised his head. The BAC 75N driver then fired a second time towards his head. Amimour's explosive belt detonated immediately afterwards. His head was projected onto the stage and his left hand near seat 23 on the first floor. On 14 November, his identity was established with near certainty by an agent of the General Directorate for Internal Security (DGSI), through comparison between a photograph of his bloody head and an anthropometric photo taken three years earlier. On 15 November, this identification was confirmed by forensic anthropologist Tania Delabarde through samples taken from his left hand.

On 16 November 2015, the press revealed to the public that Samy Amimour was one of the Bataclan suicide bombers. On the same day, his widow, Kahina El Hadra, who was residing in Mosul, sent an email to one of her former teachers glorifying her husband's actions: "I encouraged my husband to leave to terrorize the French people who have so much blood on their hands (...) I envy my husband so much, I would have loved to be with him to blow myself up too". On 28 December 2015, the contents of the message were disclosed by Le Parisien.

On 24 December 2015, Samy Amimour was buried in the Muslim plot of the intercommunal cemetery of La Courneuve, which serves the municipality of Drancy, where he originated.

On 5 July 2022, Kahina El Hadra was repatriated, against her will, from the Roj camp in Syria to France. Upon landing at Vélizy-Villacoublay Air Base, she was arrested. Subsequently, she was indicted for criminal terrorist conspiracy and placed in pre-trial detention. Her three children were placed in foster care under the responsibility of child welfare services (aide sociale à l'enfance).

== Bibliography ==
- Suc, Matthieu (2023) [2018]. Les espions de la terreur [The Spies of Terror]. Poche (in French). Paris: HarperCollins. p. 528. ISBN 979-10-339-1537-9.
