= Islamic State dinar =

Currency of the Islamic State (2014–2019)

Gold Dinar
دينار ذهبي (Arabic)

Denominations
- Banknotes: None
- Coins: 1, 5 dinars 1, 5, 10 dirhams 10, 20 fulûs

Demographics
- Replaced by: Iraqi dinar and Syrian pound
- User(s): Islamic State

Issuance
- Central bank: Diwan Bayt al-Mal
- This infobox shows the latest status before this currency was rendered obsolete.

The Islamic State dinar (Arabic: دينار الدولة الإسلامية), or simply the Gold Dinar, was the official currency of the Islamic State from 2014 to 2019. Subdivided into dirhams and fulûs, it was modelled after the historical Gold Dinar that was first introduced in the Muslim world during the time of the Umayyad Caliphate. In 2016, one Islamic State dinar had an effective exchange rate of US$190 or £91, though it did not gain traction outside of the Middle East due to the Islamic State conflict, as the international community did not recognize the Islamic State's sovereignty and designated it as a terrorist organization.

== Background ==
The Islamic State of Iraq (ISI) establishing itself in 2013 as the Islamic State of Iraq and Syria (or the Levant), and then simply as the Islamic State in June 2014. By 2015, it controlled a large amount of territory in both countries, declaring itself as a caliphate and planning to absorb other territories of the Muslim world. However, none of the United Nations member states recognized the Islamic State's sovereignty; it was instead widely designated as a terrorist organization by the international community.

== Minting and distribution ==
In a 2014 issue of the online IS magazine Dabiq, the organization announced that it was preparing to mint an independent currency based on the one used in the historical caliphates. A design of coins made of gold, silver, and copper was subsequently published. In the 2015 video The Rise of the Khilafah and the Return of the Gold Dinar, IS announced that these coins were set for release. The planned exchange rate to the United States dollar was approximately US$139. A number of analysts stated that the organization was motivated to produce such a currency for pan-Islamic propaganda purposes or for emphasizing the sovereign statehood of the so-called IS caliphate, or both. According to IS media, however, the organization's intent behind the coinage was to allow the Muslim world to be economically independent, particularly with regard to the financial influence of the Western world. In 2015, Turkish authorities discovered an underground IS minting facility in Şahinbey, a town near Gaziantep, close to the Syrian border.

Despite the extensive promotion of the IS Gold Dinar, the currency saw limited circulation. It was almost exclusively used in those parts of IS-controlled territory where it was forbidden to use other currencies. By 2019, as the IS quasi-state collapsed, the Gold Dinar was replaced by the Iraqi dinar and the Syrian pound.

== Coinage ==
A series of coins divided between Gold Dinars, Silver Dirhams, and Copper Fulûs were released, seeing limited circulation in Syria, with locals' Syrian pounds being taken away and replaced with the dinar in some regions.

There have also been reports that indicate that the coinage publicized by the group has differed greatly in terms of actual circulation.

=== Characteristics ===
Image	Value	Diameter (mm)	Thickness (mm)	Mass (g)	Composition	Edge	Obverse	Reverse
	5 Dinars	39	2.3	21.25	Gold	Reeded	Inscription and issuer	World map; value; year of minting
	1 Dinar	19	1.15	4.25	Gold	Reeded	Inscription and issuer	7 ears of wheat; value; year of minting
	10 Dirhams	38	2.4	20	Silver	Reeded	Inscription and issuer	Al-Aqsa Mosque of Jerusalem; value; year of minting
	5 Dirhams	26	1	10	Silver	Reeded	Inscription and issuer	Umayyad Mosque of Damascus; value; year of minting
	1 Dirhams	18	1	2	Silver	Reeded	Inscription and issuer	Spear and shield; value; year of minting
	20 Fulûs	37	2.6	20	Copper	Smooth	Inscription and issuer	3 date palms; value; year of minting
	10 Fulûs	29	3	10	Copper	Smooth	Inscription and issuer	Islamic crescent; value; year of minting

== See also ==
- Territory of the Islamic State
- Finances of the Islamic State
  - Terrorism financing
