= JustPaste.it =

Text storage website

- Website type: Pastebin
- Founded: 2009
- Country of origin: Poland
- Creator: Mariusz Zurawek
- Website: justpaste.it
- Registration: Optional
- Current status: Active

JustPaste.it is a site that allows users to paste text (including HTML markup for formatting and display of images) and distribute the resulting link. The site became the object of international attention after supporters of the Islamic State (abbreviated IS, ISIS, or ISIL) began to use the site to disseminate information.

== Features ==
The site operates on a simple design, allowing users to:

- Paste material and receive a link to share it without registration.
- Load the site quickly on mobile devices, even with poor internet connections.
- Use the site in right-to-left languages, such as the Arabic language.
- Use photo and video content.

According to the site's creator, Mariusz Żurawek, "You are able to do what you want with almost two clicks."

As of August 2014, the site lacked a search feature and did not run ads, nor ran displayed ads. As a free service that can be accessed by phones, from proxy IP addresses or via TOR routers, it was not able to prevent users from returning to post messages except by blocking IPs.

== Use by the Islamic State ==
Notable messages attributed to IS that have been pasted to JustPaste.it include a threat to Twitter employees who repeatedly shut down IS-linked accounts, a list of names and addresses of American armed forces personnel, and photos posted by an IS sympathizer that were used by bloggers at Bellingcat to identify the location of an IS training camp on the Euphrates river. Posting to JustPaste.it and Archive.org has been described as a response to Twitter's censorship of accounts, though "these anonymous posts eventually end up on Twitter", which suspended 20,000 accounts suspected of IS association in February 2015, but has been advised by the Brookings Project on U.S. Relations with the Islamic World to work out a "proactive strategy for finding terrorists" with the U.S. government.

== Administration ==
The site is owned and managed by Mariusz Żurawek, a Polish entrepreneur from Wrocław, who holds a master's degree in informatics and econometrics. Maintaining the site singlehandedly, he described his efforts to comply with international Internet censorship efforts. "It's not my choice that ISIS [the Islamic State] has selected my site ... As long as I'm cooperating with the police, removing content, not allowing ISIS to make propaganda, I think it's good for the site that many people will know about it." According to Zurawek, "I've got a constant cooperation with the UK police, and if they found any illegal materials, they just send a take-down notice." Materials for which the police request deletion include "videos attempting to persuade western Muslims to join Isis, graphic executions committed by Isis fighters and other material which incites violence and glorifies the actions of this group".
