= Fi sabilillah =

Arabic expression meaning "in the cause of Allah"

The phrase fi sabilillah (فِي سَبِيلِ ٱللَّٰهِ, fī sabīli llāh^{i}) is an Arabic expression meaning "in the cause of God", or more befittingly, "for the sake of God". Alternative spellings for fi sabilillah include fisabilillah and fisabillillah

The phrase - which relates the distribution of zakat - is found frequently in the Quran, e.g. in surah 9, verse 60:

As-Sadaqat (zakat) are only for the Fuqara' (the poor), and Al-Masākīn (the needy) and those employed to collect (the funds); and to attract the hearts of those who have been inclined (towards Islam); and to free the captives; and for those in debt; and for Fi sabilillah (Allah's cause), and for Ibn As-Sabil a duty imposed by Allah. And Allah is All-Knower, All-Wise.

From the above context it is closely associated with alms-giving or charity, meaning "he dedicated the revenue or profit to be used in the cause of God", i.e. "he gave to charity". A classical example discussed by Lane in his Arabic-English Lexicon of 1863 is that of Umar who decided to give the revenue of a palm grove of his to charitable use. Because of these connotations, the phrase is closely associated with the concept of zakah in fiqh (Islamic jurisprudence).

With regards to this phrase's use in Qur'an 9:60 above, according to Maududi majority of earliest Muslim scholars opined fi-sabilillah to mean Jihad, for example, the 14th century scholar Ibn Kathir explained it as: "In the cause of Allah is exclusive for the benefit of the fighters in jihad, who do not receive compensation from the Muslim Treasury." However, Maududi also points out that early scholars were mistaken in limiting Jihad here only to fighting as its peaceful, non-militaristic connotation is also relevant and applicable here. Shafi Usmani interprets it as a religious cause which can include military Jihad or performing some other personal religious duty, such as the Hajj. The progressive scholar, Ghamidi, interprets it broadly as "works in the service of religion".

== See also ==
- Jihad – which contains further explanations and applications for the term 'Fi sabilillah'
- Zakat – which contains information relating to the distribution to 'Fi sabilillah' recipients
- Kiddush Hashem - a similar term in Judaism
- Brahmacharya - a term for religious self conduct in Hinduism, Jainism and Buddhism
