= Mohammed Khalifa =

Canadian ISIS member (born 1984)

- Born: July 10, 1983 (age 43); Jeddah, Saudi Arabia
- Other names: Abu Ridwan al-Kanadi, Abu Muthanna al-Muhajir, Mohammed Abdullah Mohammed
- Occupation: Computer programmer
- Known for: Narrating Islamic State videos
- Conviction: Providing material support to a designated foreign terrorist organization (18 U.S.C. § 2339B)
- Penalty: Life imprisonment

Mohammed Khalifa (born 10 July 1983), also known by his noms de guerre Abu Ridwan al-Kanadi and Abu Muthanna al-Muhajir, is a Canadian citizen who traveled to Islamic State-occupied territory, where he narrated various Islamic State videos.

Observers had long speculated that two important Islamic State war videos, Flames of War and Flames of War 2, were narrated by a Canadian. Khalifa was captured in a clash with the Syrian Democratic Forces in January 2019, and acknowledged that he was the narrator of both films.

The Flames of War was described as one of the most influential Islamic State war videos. It is 55 minutes long, much of the footage filmed with a GoPro style body-camera, worn by a fighter, who first digs in, then charges Syrian soldiers. Other footage records prisoners first being made to dig their own graves, then showing their brutal executions.

The New York Times hired three voice recognition experts, who had served as expert witnesses, Catalin Grigoras, Jeff M. Smith and Robert C. Maher, who all agreed recordings made when Rukmini Callimachi interviewed him matched the narration of the videos.

According to Charlie Winter, a counter-terrorism specialist from the International Center for the Study of Radicalization, "His voice is the most recognizable English-speaking voice to have ever appeared in Islamic State propaganda." Winter called The Flames of War

According to Amarnath Amarasingam, of the Institute for Strategic Dialogue, "He is a symbol — the voice coming out of ISIS, speaking to the English-speaking world, for the better part of the last four to five years."

In October 2021, Khalifa was flown to Virginia and arrested by the Federal Bureau of Investigation. Prosecutors charged him with "material terrorism support leading to death", alleging that he was responsible for publicising the infamous video of James Foley's beheading. Raj Parekh, acting US attorney, described Khalifa as "the voice behind the violence".

On December 10, 2021, Khalifa pleaded guilty to conspiring to provide material support to a terrorist organization, resulting in death. He was sentenced to life in prison on 29 July 2022.
