= Qatar corruption scandal at the European Parliament =

2022 political corruption scandal around the European Parliament

The Qatar corruption scandal at the European Parliament, also known as Qatargate, is a cash-for-influence investigation into several Members of the European Parliament and their associates, who are accused of accepting cash and gifts from Qatar and Morocco in return for promoting the interests of those countries in the European Union.

The scandal broke on 9 December 2022, when police raided properties in Brussels, seized over €1 million in cash, and arrested a number of suspects, including Greek MEP and Vice-President of the European Parliament Eva Kaili and her partner Francisco Giorgi, a parliamentary assistant. Also detained were Antonio Panzeri, head of an NGO and a former Italian MEP, and Niccolò Figà-Talamanca, head of an NGO. Kaili denied charges of corruption, money-laundering and belonging to a criminal organisation, while her partner admitted his role in the affair. Panzeri agreed to a plea-deal, providing information to the police in return for a reduced sentence. Figà-Talamanca denied the charges. In February 2023, MEPs Marc Tarabella and Andrea Cozzolino were arrested and charged; both deny wrong-doing. In early 2025, former Belgian MEP Marie Arena was charged with belonging to a criminal organisation, which she denies.

The origins of the investigation into the scandal date from the spring of 2022, when Belgian security services mounted a surveillance operation against Panzeri, following a tip-off from another European intelligence service that he had been accepting bribes from Morocco. Information was passed on to the federal prosecutor's office, which opened a police investigation in July 2022. Since the original arrests in December 2022, the prosecution has experienced a number of setbacks and delays. In June 2023, the lead investigating judge, Michel Claise, stepped down following accusations of a conflict of interest. Lawyers for the accused sought a judicial review into the way the investigation had been carried out. The Court of Appeal heard arguments in December 2025 and ruled, in February 2026, that the investigation had not been significantly flawed and that the prosecution could proceed. As of April 2026, no trial date had been set.

Immediately after the first arrests, the President of the European Parliament, Roberta Metsola, said that the parliament stood firmly against corruption and was co-operating with the police investigation. The full chamber voted to remove Kaili as a vice president; she was also expelled from the Socialists & Democrats group (S&D). In September 2023, the European Parliament revised its rules of procedure and its code of conduct, but the system regarding monitoring and sanctioning remained largely unchanged and lacking in external oversight.

== Allegations and events leading up to the arrests ==
In the spring of 2022, Belgian security services mounted a surveillance operation against former MEP Antonio Panzeri, following a tip-off from another European intelligence service that he had been accepting bribes from Morocco. Information was passed on to the federal prosecutor's office, which opened an investigation in July 2022.

According to the testimony of Francesco Giorgi, since 2019, Qatar has funneled cash to Antonio Panzeri. Panzeri, a former member of the European Parliament, and Eva Kaili, a sitting member, were trying to influence voting at the European Parliament in favour of Qatar. Bribes related to Qatar, as well as the Mauritanian government, were, according to Giorgi, channeled through a Brussels-based organization co-founded by Panzeri called Fight Impunity. Iqbal Survé, a controversial businessman from South Africa, was found to be the largest donor to Fight Impunity via his Sekunjalo Development Foundation. Survé's foundation made a donation of €250,000 to the lobbying group between July and September 2020.

Belgian authorities are investigating a broader scheme, aimed at influencing decisions by the European Parliament in favour of Qatar. Panzeri's testimony contradicts that of Giorgi, who is Kaili's partner and a former parliamentary advisor to Panzeri, in certain aspects. In his leaked interview with Belgian authorities, Panzeri claimed that the first cash payments came from Morocco, prior to Qatar's involvement. The significant leaks of testimonies in the case are raising legal concerns for the Belgian authorities as they continue their investigation.

Kaili's actions had already attracted suspicion among the members of her S&D party before her arrest. Dutch lawmaker Lara Wolters, who served in the European Parliament with the same political group as Kaili, described Kaili's modus operandi in an interview with the EU Scream podcast. According to Wolters, Kaili tried to prevent her from expressing views critical of Qatar during discussions in the European Parliament. Kaili's last known action in favour of Qatar before her arrest was casting a vote in the Civil Liberties Committee (of which she was not a member) in support of a report advocating for visa-free travel to the EU for Qatari citizens. While this vote was allowed under the European Parliament' rules, Kaili should have notified members and parliament staff of her intention to vote in advance, which she failed to do. German member Gabriele Bischoff said that Kaili's vote violated "internal rules".

== Raids and arrests ==
In July 2022, the Central Office for the Repression of Corruption (French: Office central pour la répression de la corruption, OCRC, Dutch: Centrale Dienst voor de Bestrijding van Corruptie), a unit of the Belgian Federal Police, opened an investigation into an alleged criminal organisation. The investigation was led by Michel Claise, an investigating magistrate who works with the GRECO (Group of States against Corruption).

On 9 December 2022, acting on the investigation, Belgian police conducted 20 raids at 19 different addresses across Brussels in connection with the conspiracy, resulting in eight arrests across Belgium and Italy. The homes and offices of the suspects were searched, including offices within the European Parliament buildings in Brussels. As required by the Belgian Constitution, the President of the European Parliament, Roberta Metsola, had to return from her home in Malta to be present during searches of the properties of Eva Kaili and Marc Tarabella, both of whom who held parliamentary immunity as MEPs.

The first arrest took place at Sofitel hotel at Place Jourdan, Brussels, where investigators arrested Eva Kaili's father, Alexandros. He was found with a suitcase containing "several hundred thousand euros" while attempting to flee. Investigating judge Michel Claise deemed the arrest in flagrante delicto, or caught in the act, which resulted in Kaili losing her parliamentary immunity, enabling investigators to search her property. Around a dozen police officers, along with judge Claise, searched Kaili's apartment, where she was subsequently arrested. According to reports, Kaili did not resist but appeared "in a state of shock and confusion, crying and terrified." She was then interrogated for more than five hours.

The raids also targeted locations connected to Antonio Panzeri, an Italian former MEP. During a search of his home, police found a large quantity of cash in his "well-stocked safe". Simultaneously, investigators raided the offices of the international NGO Fight Impunity, an organisation founded to promote the fight against impunity for serious human rights violations and crimes against humanity, where Panzeri served as president.

As a result of the Brussels raids, police arrested several key figures, including Eva Kaili; Antonio Panzeri; Francesco Giorgi, Kaili's life partner and an adviser of the Italian MEP Andrea Cozzolino; Alexandros Kailis, Kaili's father and a former Greek politician; Luca Visentini, the general secretary of the International Trade Union Confederation (ITUC); Niccolò Figà-Talamanca, Secretary-General of the NGO No Peace Without Justice. At Panzeri's home, police reportedly found €600,000 in cash, with additional cash discovered at Kaili's father's home, his hotel room and the residence shared by Kaili and Giorgi. The total cash seized during the raids was €1.5 million. After her arrest, Kaili was detained at the Saint-Gilles Prison before being transferred to Haren Prison five days later.

As the raids were being conducted in Brussels, the Italian State Police executed two European Arrest Warrants in Italy. Maria Colleoni, Panzeri's wife, was arrested at their family home in Calusco d'Adda, near Bergamo, Italy, and his daughter, Silvia Panzeri, was arrested later that evening in Milan. Both women were transferred to a prison in Bergamo for detention. As of 14 December 2022, they had been released under house arrest to a property in Lombardy. Shortly thereafter, Italian authorities raided the Italian home of Francesco Giorgi, where an additional €20,000 in cash was confiscated.

The European Arrest Warrant confirmed reports that the charges against Panzeri were related to corruption and gifts he had received from nation-states. The publication of the warrant was the first time that Morocco was implicated in the scandal.

The day after the raids, on 10 December, a further search was conducted at the home of Belgian MEP Marc Tarabella, Vice Chair of the European Parliament's Delegation for relations with the Arab Peninsula. Tarabella had not yet been arrested.

On 12 December 2022, it was announced that the Greek Anti-Money Laundering Authority had frozen all of Kaili's assets, as well as those of her close family members. This included her bank accounts, safes, companies, and any other financial assets. The head of the Anti-Money Laundering Authority noted that a newly established estate agency in Kolonaki, an upmarket neighbourhood of Athens, was of particular interest to the investigation. In addition, Greek authorities seized a 7,000 square-metre plot of land on Paros, Greece in the Cyclades islands, which had been purchased jointly by Kaili and Giorgi.

As the European Parliament convened for the first time following the scandal, on 13 December 2022, at its seat in Strasbourg, France, the offices of MEP Pietro Bartolo and Parliamentary official Mychelle Rieu were sealed by investigators.

On 15 December, the European Public Prosecutor's Office (EPPO) requested that the European Parliament lift the parliamentary immunity of Eva Kaili and her fellow Greek MEP Maria Spyraki. The EPPO explained that the request was based on an investigative report from the European Anti-Fraud Office (OLAF), regarding raised "suspicion of fraud detrimental to the EU budget, in relation to the management of the parliamentary allowance." The request particularly pertained to funds paid to parliamentary assistants.

On 2 January 2023, Belgian investigators submitted a request to the European Parliament to strip MEPs Marc Tarabella and Andrea Cozzolino of their parliamentary immunity. A hearing of the Parliament's Legal Affairs Committee was scheduled during the parliamentary sitting in Strasbourg on 16 January, allowing the accused MEPs to present their defence. The parties of both Tarabella and Cozzolino expressed their support for President Metsola's requests to assist the European Public Prosecutor's Office in the investigations and agreed to vote in favour of waiving their immunity. On 2 February, the European Parliament approved the request to lift their immunity. Both Tarabella and Cozzolino were arrested on charges of corruption, money-laundering and participation in a criminal organization under arrest warrants issued on 10 February 2023.

In July 2023, investigators additionally searched the offices of Belgian MEP Marie Arena. They discovered €280,000 in cash in the apartment of her son, Ugo Lemaire, which is located next to Arena's own flat. These raids occurred after the investigating judge, Michel Claise, recused himself from the case, as his son is a business partner of Ugo Lemaire in a Cannabis business, BRC & Co.

== Connections with Morocco ==
Belgian Justice Minister Vincent Van Quickenborne described Morocco as a nation known for interfering in the EU. He said the investigation was focusing on multiple subjects, including the EU-Morocco trade agreements and the fisheries agreement.

A report by the Financial Times revealed that the Pier Antonio Panzeri received bribes, gifts and luxury hotel stays from the Moroccan government. The former Italian MEP had ties with Moroccan officials since he was the head of the European Parliament's EU-Maghreb delegation. Records revealed that during his time in the parliament Panzeri supported decisions favoring the Moroccan government. He had raised a request to the European Commission for allocation of more funds for Morocco, and also voted in favor of Morocco's trade agreement with the EU and the fisheries agreement. Panzeri received secret payments from Morocco's ambassador to Poland Abderrahim Atmoun through the NGOs.

Panzeri and Atmoun worked together as co-chairs of the Morocco-EU joint parliamentary committee. Panzeri admitted Atmoun provided financial help for his 2014 electoral campaign, including covering a €50,000 cost of a party in Milan.

In 2014, Moroccan King Mohammed VI awarded Panzeri with the third class Order of Ouissam Alaouite for his services to Rabat. Atmoun received the same decoration at the same event. Belgium has drafted a request for a European arrest warrant for Atmoun who is believed to have received funds from Moroccan officials to bribe members of European Parliament to favour Morocco.

Atmoun in 2019 brokered a deal between Morocco's foreign intelligence agency, Direction générale des études et de la documentation (DGED) and Panzeri and his colleague Francesco Giorgi, whereby the two would each receive €50,000 a year for lobbying on behalf of Morocco.

Marie Arena, head of the subcommittee on human rights comes into the Morocco scene, Atmoun invited Arena and Panzeri to Morocco in January 2022. Giorgi reported that he and Panzeri billed Atmoun for ensuring that mentions of Morocco vanished from a Parliament report on human rights violations. Later in 2022 Arena's son, Ugo Lemaire went on a trip to Morocco, paid for by a Moroccan company.

Andrea Cozzolino also appears in the Morocco investigation, he was part of the committee investigating Morocco's use of spyware and was chair of the Parliament's Maghreb delegation coordinating the EU interaction with North African countries. Cozzolino and Atmoun met with Morocco's DGED in Warsaw.

In September 2022, 4 Brussels MPs – David Leisterh, David Weytsman, Clémentine Barzin, and Gaëtan Van Goidsenhoven – visited the city of Laâyoune in Western Sahara. The Moroccan parliament had invited the MEPs and paid for the entire trip. Western Sahara is a disputed region, which Morocco claims to be its own. However, after the Belgium investigation opened, the MEPs' trip came under greater scrutiny.

During an exclusive interview with El Mundo on 5 June 2023, Kaili said, "I was not spied on with Pegasus, but for Pegasus, we believe Morocco, Spain, France and Belgium spied on the European Parliament's committee." In a statement to Politico, she said that Belgian secret services monitored her due to her work on the parliament's committee investigating the use of Pegasus spyware in Europe, claiming that this was the "real scandal". Revealed in Euro News article, it was mentioned that Belgian authorities tried to force her to name people in the case in exchange for "a deal".

Furthermore, according to the Spanish activist and politician Miguel Urbán statement, the Qatargate scandal points to an even deeper Moroccogate affair. The European Parliament should take the same precautionary measures with Morocco as it did with Qatar. Every European Parliament legislative activity in recent years involving Moroccan interests should be retrospectively reviewed to ensure that it has not been influenced by foreign interference.

== Connections with Mauritania ==
In testimony given by Antonio Panzeri in February 2023, he and Francesco Giorgi received €200,000 from Mauritania to improve the image of the country in the EU, as requested by then-president, Mohamed Ould Abdel Aziz in 2018. Aziz left office in 2019, with Mohamed Ould Ghazouani winning the election to become president. Paid €50,000 per annum from 2019, Panzeri helped organise an international conference in Mauritania in June 2022.

Mauritania only abolished slavery in 1981 and had been criticised by the EU for their human rights record, yet received millions annually from the EU to host fishing vessels. Marie Arena, as head of the EU subcommittee on human rights, proposed the conference and invited Panzeri, who was no longer an MEP to attend. Panzeri and Giorgi were speakers and Andrea Cozzolino also attended, Arena and Cozzolino meeting with the President of Mauritania, Ghazouani.

== Investigation ==
The four charged suspects, Kaili, Panzeri, Giorgi and Figà-Talamanca, were scheduled to appear at the Palais de Justice, Brussels, the country's primary law courts, on 14 December 2022. Three of the four suspects appeared in court, but strike action by prison staff prevented Kaili's appearance; her appearance was rescheduled for 22 December 2022. Panzeri and Giorgi were both remanded into custody pending further investigation. Kaili's postponed hearing was eventually heard in an closed session at the Palais de Justice on 22 December from where she was remanded in custody for at least another month despite her appeal for conditional release under electronic supervision. Figà-Talamanca was initially to be released from custody on the condition that he wear an electronic monitoring ankle bracelet, but the decision was overturned on 27 December 2022 after the prosecutors appealed. A hearing involving Panzeri was postponed at his own request to 17 January 2023.

Giorgi confessed on 15 December 2022 to having been bribed by Qatari officials to influence the European Parliament's decisions. He also confessed receiving funds from the Moroccan government, and while exonerating his partner, Kaili, he explicitly implicated the involvement of Panzeri, Cozzolino, and Tarabella.

Visentini admitted on 20 December to receiving two payments from Fight Impunity for €50,000 and €60,000 but claimed the donations were contributions toward his campaign to become General-Secretary of ITUC and not to "influence [ITUC's] position on Qatar or on any other issues".

On 16 January 2023 an Italian court approved the extradition of Silvia Panzeri, daughter of Pier Antonio.

In January 2023 Panzeri pleaded guilty to his part of the conspiracy as part of a plea deal with the Belgian authorities. As part of the deal Panzeri will reveal the identities of those he bribed as well as those he conspired with. It is foreseen he will receive a sentence of five years of which four would be suspended. The remaining year would be served in prison or with an electronic bracelet, or a combination of both. This was only the second time that Belgian prosecutors have made a plea deal as they were previously not permissible in law.

The German magazine Der Spiegel was given access to over 1,300 documents from the Belgian investigation. According to these documents, Panzeri's group received payment in cash from Qatar, Morocco, Mauritania and possibly Saudi Arabia. The group are described as "shockingly amateurish", because they stored the money they received in bribes in their apartments, made hundreds of unencrypted telephone calls and held a "conspiratorial meeting in a hotel that was full of surveillance cameras". Nevertheless, they operated undetected for years. A spreadsheet found on one computer lists 199 meetings and activities undertaken by a number of named people between April 2018 and December 2022.

In June 2023, lead investigator Claise recused himself after the lawyer of Tarabella, one of the accused, raised allegations of a conflict of interest, due to the fact that Claise's eldest son ran a company with the son of Arena, an associate of Panzeri. The prosecutor's office said that the action was taken due to "the substantial work he and his investigators have done in this case" and "the absence of any real evidence to cast doubt on the probity of any of the parties involved." Claise was replaced by Aurélie Dejaiffe. The Court of Appeal ruled, in February 2026, that there had been no conflict of interest, but Claise had in the meantime retired.

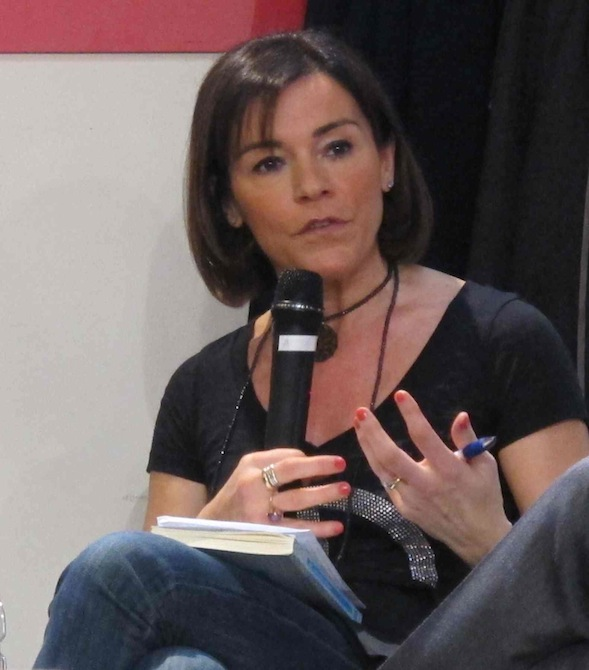
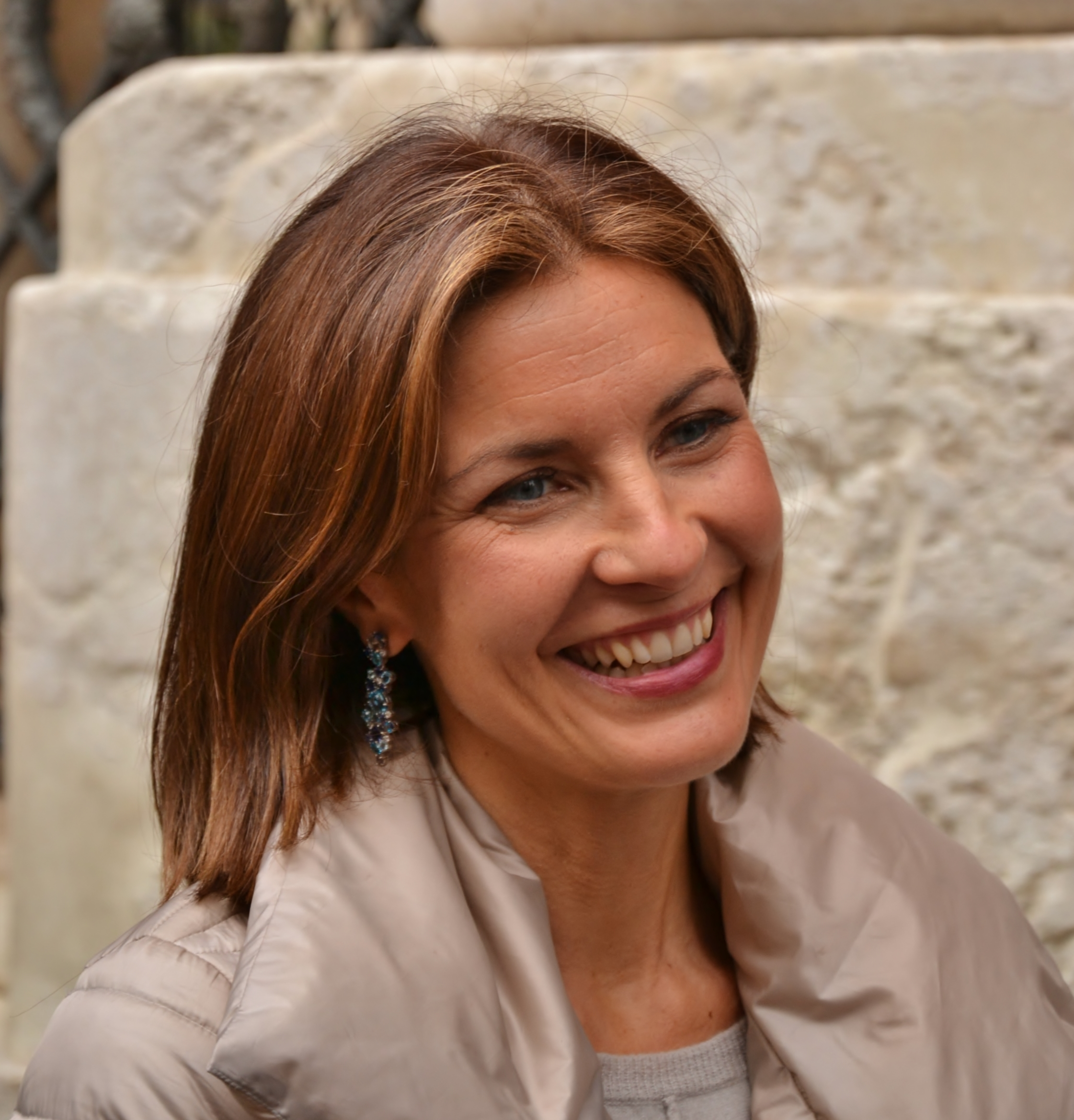
Elisabetta Gualmini (left) and Alessandra Moretti (right).

In March 2025, the Belgian Prosecutor's Office requested the lifting of parliamentary immunity for Elisabetta Gualmini and Alessandra Moretti. In December 2025, the European Parliament voted in favour of removing Moretti's immunity, but against removing that of Gualmini.

As of March 2026, no trial date had been set in the case. Defence lawyers had lodged a complaint about the way the investigation had been conducted; in February 2026, the Court of Appeal ruled that there had been no significant flaws in the investigation and that the prosecution could continue.

== Reactions ==
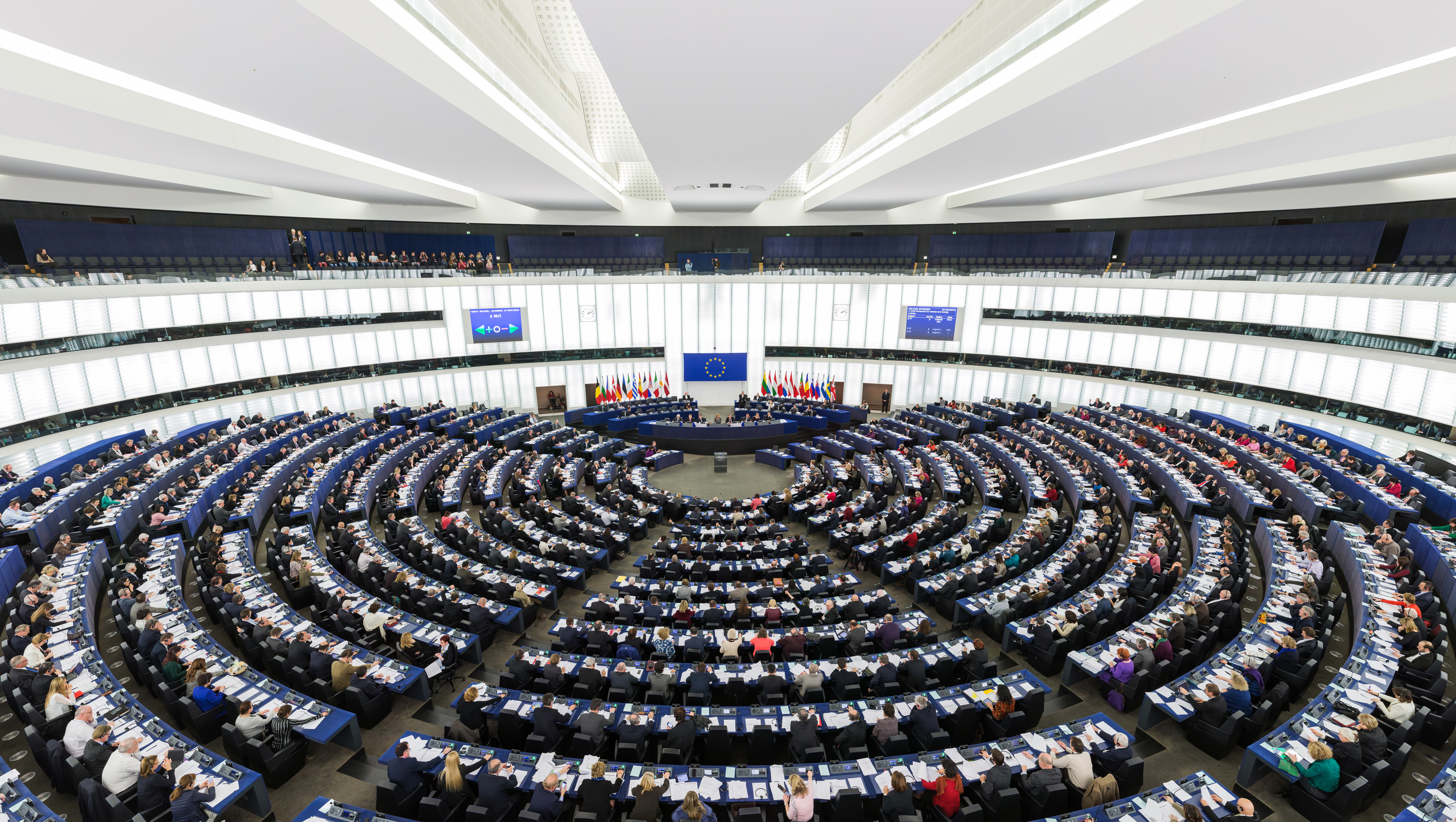
Inside the Hemicycle of the European Parliament, Strasbourg

=== Political ===
Immediately following the arrests, strong reactions of condemnation of Vice-President Kaili came from around the European Union. After the story was first reported by Belgian media, the President of the European Parliament, Roberta Metsola, stated that the European Parliament had been complying with an ongoing investigation, without specifying its nature. Immediately following the arrests, both PASOK, Kaili's political party in Greece, and the Socialists and Democrats Group inside the European Parliament announced Kaili's suspension from their respective parties. Two days following the arrests, Metsola suspended Kaili's responsibilities and powers as a Vice-President of the European Parliament. Three days later, in a vote of the full chamber, Kaili was officially removed as vice president by a supermajority.

At the opening of the first meeting of the European Parliament following the raids, on 12 December President Metsola announced that all work with Qatar would be suspended. The suspension of Parliamentary business at such a time was significant as it comes just three days before the Parliament was due to vote on introducing a visa-free travel agreement with Qatar and other countries. This resulted in the vote on visa-free travel to Ecuador, Kuwait, and Oman also being cancelled. In addition, a major and controversial air transit agreement that would have allowed Qatar Airways unlimited access to the EU market was put on hold after warning that Qatar may have interfered in Parliament's internal deliberations on the agreement. During the negotiations there was criticism by EU member states that the agreement, negotiated by the Parliament's transport committee, was unduly favourable to Qatar. Later the full chamber voted to suspend all work on files involving Qatar in a 541–2 vote, with three abstentions. At the same meeting the Greens–European Free Alliance and Renew Europe both called for an inquiry committee to be set up by the European Parliament. In a vote of the chamber, the Parliament adopted a resolution creating a Committee of Inquiry into the affair.

Ahead of the opening of the plenary discussion several MEPs in the Socialists and Democrats Group stepped down from positions within the Parliament. Marc Tarabella suspended himself from the S&D group entirely, Marie Arena stood down as the Chair of the Parliament's human rights committee, Pietro Bartolo suspended his position as group spokesman on visa liberalisation and Andrea Cozzolino suspended his role as group spokesman on urgencies. Tarabella was later suspended by his national party, the Walloon Socialist Party.

The chair of the Parliamentary EU–Qatar Friendship Group, José Ramón Bauzá MEP, announced the suspension of the group following the revelation. In a statement Bauzá said that he was doing so "in view of the very serious events of the last few days, and until we get to the bottom of the matter".

The European People's Party (EPP), the largest political group inside the Parliament, took the decision to suspend all foreign policy work relating to all matters external to the European Union until the integrity of the procedure could be ensured. The EPP encouraged other parties to follow suit.

Dino Giarrusso MEP reported that he and others had been approached by Qatari officials many times: "They were hoping to improve the country's reputation especially in the run-up to the FIFA World Cup". A resolution by Manon Aubry condemning the exploitation of migrant workers in Qatar had stalled in the Parliament for more than one year before passing, due to opposition from the S&D and EPP group.

After the scandal broke out, several media organisations noted that Kaili had visited Qatar one month before the scandal, meeting with the Qatari Minister of Labour Ali bin Samikh Al Marri; upon her return to Brussels, she had praised Qatar as a "frontrunner in labour rights" in a speech in front of the European Parliament.

Ursula von der Leyen, President of the European Commission, accused Qatar of seeking to buy influence in the European Parliament chamber and that it was of the "utmost concern". Von der Leyen called for a body to be created to uphold the rules on integrity and ethics across all EU institutions. The former president of the European Parliament and current European Commissioner responsible for Foreign Affairs and Security, Josep Borrell, was quoted as saying "the news is very worrisome, very, very worrisome. We are facing some events, some facts that certainly worry me. [We] have to act according not only to the facts but to the ... evidence. I am sure you understand that these are very grave accusations." The European Ombudsman, Emily O'Reilly, was, however critical of the response of Von der Leyen and fellow politicians and institutions, highlighting the lack of progress shown by von der Leyen following her pledge that transparency would be a core part of her mandate when she became European Commission President. O'Reilly called for a body to be created with real investigatory and sanctions powers.

The Belgian Prime Minister, Alexander De Croo, was also critical of the European institutions in his response, stating that "Belgian justice is doing what, at first sight, the European Parliament hasn't done." "The European Parliament has a lot of means to regulate itself. It turns out that this is largely a system of auto-control based on voluntary efforts, which has clearly not been sufficient."

Annalena Baerbock, the German Minister for Foreign Affairs, highlighted that the scandal is leading to concerns from citizens and affects the credibility and legitimacy of the institutions of the European Union.

On 15 December the European People's Party (EPP) reacted by declaring, "We need to discuss hypocrisy ... This is an S&D scandal." In an attempt to focus the scandal on the Progressive Alliance of Socialists and Democrats Group (S&D), rather than the European Parliament as a whole, they continued, "There has been a consistent effort to turn #Qatargate into an institutional issue alone. But this scandal is not an orphan. ... It has an address. And that's the S&D Group." One of the assistants whose flats were searched (Giuseppe Meroni) works for the EPP member Lara Comi, and the EPP member Maria Spyraki was later also put under investigation by the European Public Prosecutor's Office (EPPO).

The S&D Group commissioned an inquiry conducted from March to June 2023 by three independent experts: former MEP Richard Corbett, auditor and governance expert Jean-Pierre Garitte, and expert in economic criminal law Silvina Bacigalupo. They presented their initial report to the Group in July. It warned of a heightened risk of geostrategic interference and geostrategic corruption and warned that the EU institutions need to strengthen their resilience by updating their rules and procedures. It pointed out that the existing regulatory framework laying down ethical requirements for MEPs and staff is distributed over at least 27 different documents at various levels of the legal hierarchy, from treaty-level provisions to EU legislation, inter-institutional agreements, parliamentary rules of procedure, the MEP code of conduct and a range of decisions by the Parliament, its Bureau, the Conference of Presidents and the Secretary General. The report identified some 50 shortcomings in them, from gaps to contradictions, weak wording, unclear obligations and inadequate enforcement. This part of the report fed into the subsequent revision of the European Parliament's Rules of Procedure and the Code of Conduct for Members (see below) adopted in September 2023. A section of the report pertaining to the internal functioning of the S&D Group was held over until September 2023 to allow for a discussion of its findings with the S&D Bureau prior to its publication.

=== Civil society ===
Reactions also came from European civil society organisations. Transparency International described the incident as "the most egregious case" of alleged corruption the European Parliament has ever seen. The founder of the Good Lobby commented that "[w]hatever its final outcome, [the] Qatar 'corruption' scandal has unveiled an inconvenient, and for most Europeans already obvious, truth. Money does buy influence in the EU", and that "[t]he EU Parliament and most of its members have historically resisted stricter integrity rules and [an] effective enforcement system."

As news broke of the investigation, the honorary board of the implicated NGO, Fight Impunity, resigned en masse. The board members included high-profile European policymakers including Federica Mogherini (former EU High Representative in the Juncker Commission), Bernard Cazeneuve (formerly Prime Minister of France), Dimitris Avramopoulos (former EU Commissioner for Migration, Home Affairs and Citizenship in the Juncker Commission), Cecilia Wikström (former MEP) and Emma Bonino (former EU Commissioner for Health and Consumer Protection in the Santer Commission). The honorary board has no executive or managerial role, so there is no suspicion or accusations against any member of the board.

Visentini originally voluntarily stood down temporarily as president of the International Trade Union Congress but a specially convened Extraordinary Meeting of the General Council voted to suspend him of all of his duties. ITUC stated their "total opposition" to all forms of corruption and "where corruption exists, workers are among its principal victims". ITUC stated that their decision to suspend Visentini "This in no way implies any presumption of guilt."

=== Government of Qatar ===
The Qatari government denied any involvement in the scandal with the Qatari Mission to the European Union saying, "[t]he State of Qatar categorically rejects any attempts to associate it with accusations of misconduct. Any association of the Qatari government with the reported claims is baseless and gravely misinformed. The State of Qatar works through institution-to-institution engagement and operates in full compliance with international laws and regulations." They later accused the United Arab Emirates of "orchestrating" the scandal. Journalist Jack Parrock reported that the Qatari government claimed "everyone" believed that the UAE was behind it. According to the Qatari state-funded Middle East Monitor "[t]he European Union Parliament has opened an official investigation into corruption cases and suspicions involving senior officials from the UAE to launch a smear campaign against Qatar coinciding with hosting the 2022 FIFA World Cup." Qatar claims that "since 2017, Qatar feels it has been the victim of a media attack orchestrated by Abu Dhabi, with false documents and fake news."

The Qatari government stated that they were being "exclusively criticised and attacked" by Belgian authorities and conveyed disappointment that the Belgian government "made no effort to engage with our government to establish the facts".

Qatar warned that the continued implication of Qatar in the scandal will "negatively effect" the energy cooperation between the EU and Qatar.

=== Defendants ===
==== Eva Kaili ====
Kaili denied any wrongdoing in the controversy. Her lawyers appeared on Greek TV stating that she "declares her innocence and that she has nothing to do with bribery from Qatar". Kaili's lawyers were also critical of her arrest as a "gross overreach of judicial power". They maintain that Kaili was in a state of shock, fear and confusion during her first interview and that she was not provided with an interpreter for the interview. According to her lawyers, it took a week for Kaili to be in "good enough psychological condition to be fully aware of what she was saying". Kaili reportedly felt "very troubled" and betrayed by her partner, Giorgi, according to her lawyers.

Kaili has accused the Belgian authorities of "inhuman" behavior due to the Belgian authorities refusal to allow her to see her daughter in person or via Skype. Kaili said: "I am being tortured, this is so unfair that I cannot stand it, and I am breaking down. What is the problem with my little girl, why are they keeping her away from me?". (Note: "Βασανίζομαι. Είναι άδικο αυτό. Δεν αντέχω. Καταρρέω. Τι τους φταίει η μικρή και την κρατάνε μακριά μου."[I am being tortured, this is so unfair that I cannot stand it, and I am breaking down. What is the problem with my little girl, why are they keeping her away from me?]) The following day a three-hour meeting between Kaili and her daughter was authorised. The court decided on 16 February 2023 to keep Kaili in detention for another two months. Kaili had changed her Belgian lawyer from André Risopoulo to Sven Mary some time before the hearing. Mary had "represented one of the terrorists behind the 2015 Paris attacks".

Kaili was released from pre-trial detention with an electronic bracelet on 14 April 2023 and, throughout the process, has continued to deny all charges against her. In June Kaili was given permission to travel anywhere in the Schengen zone and attend the European Parliament, if she wished.

In September 2023 Kaili started legal proceedings against the Belgian police and secret services for violating her parliamentary immunity. She and her lawyer coined the term "Belgiangate" to describe what they said was the mishandling of the case by the Belgian authorities. In February 2026, the Court of Appeal rejected her claims.

==== Francesco Giorgi ====
Francesco Giorgi is the former parliamentary assistant and domestic partner of Eva Kaili. He was arrested in December 2022 before being released with an electronic tag in February 2023 having agreed a deal with the prosecutor to reveal details of the illegal organisation.

According to his LinkedIn profile, Giorgi studied political science at the University of Milan.

Giorgi started his relationship with Kaili in 2017. At the time Giorgi worked as an assistant at the European Parliament to Antonio Panzeri. Giorgi and Kaili have a child together.

Giorgi was arrested by Belgian authorities mid-December 2022 in the context of the Qatargate scandal. He admitted having accepted bribes and alleged his partner Kaili was not directly involved in the corruption scheme. Giorgi is alleged to have helped channel funds from Qatar and Morocco to influence European institutions through setting up the association Fight Impunity together with Antonio Panzeri. In February 2023 Giorgi was released from prison with an electronic tag.

Italian prosecutors have initiated an investigation in March 2023 into activities of two unnamed suspects who would have acted as collaborators of Antonio Panzeri and Giorgi. The Italian investigation related to a company called Equality Consultancy in Milan set up by a former accountant of Antonio Panzeri and Giorgi's father Luciano and brother Stefano in 2018. The brother and father of Giorgi left the company after a year and are not being investigated by Italian authorities. Equality Consultancy was allegedly set up to cover up the bribes Antonio Panzeri would have received from foreign governments. Giorgi admitted according to the Financial Times helping Antonio Panzeri disguise money received from Morocco and Qatar.

Among the clients of the Milan-based consultancy was the UK-based Turkish human rights consultant Hakan Camuz. Hakan Camuz said that he hired the firm for what he called ethical lobbying services, which included facilitating of meetings with members of the European Parliament. Hakan Camus' objective was to lobby for condemnation of war crimes in Syria and he declared having no knowledge of any wrongdoings of Giorgi and Antonio Panzeri. The commercial relationship started with Giorgi approaching him.

==== Antonio Panzeri ====
As part of Panzeri's plea deal he confirmed the involvement of Qatar and Morocco in the scandal, and admitted to being a leader of the criminal enterprise. Panzeri had pledged to share "substantial, revealing" information after reaching a repentance agreement with the Belgian Prosecutor.

In September 2023 Panzeri was released from pre-trial detention but forbidden to leave Belgium or contact any other suspects.

==== Niccolò Figà-Talamanca ====
Niccolò Figà-Talamanca, the secretary-general of the NGO No Peace Without Justice, was one of the original four suspects arrested in the case. On 14 December 2022, Figà-Talamanca was released from prison with an electronic bracelet to track his movements, but the Belgian federal prosecutor successfully appealed the order on 27 December 2022, so Figà-Talamanca went back to prison. Figà-Talamanca was released from prison without conditions by the investigative judge at a hearing on 3 February 2023. Figà-Talamanca's lawyer at the hearings was Barbara Huylebroek. According to a member of his family, Figà-Talamanca remains charged.

==== Marc Tarabella ====
On 2 February 2023, the European Parliament removed Marc Tarabella's legal immunity; Tarabella was present and voted. Marc Tarabella was arrested on 10 February 2023 in Anthisnes where he is mayor. On 11 February, he was charged with corruption, money laundering, and participation in a criminal organisation, and incarcerated in Prison de Saint-Gilles. Tarabella's lawyer, Maxim Töller, has asked for the dismissal of the investigating judge, Michel Claise, on the grounds that "the judge clearly seems to take for granted the contested facts that are the subject of the investigation he is leading." On 20 February, the Federal Prosecutor's Office said that Claise opposed Töller's recusal motion, so the Federal Prosecutor's Office is obliged to refer Töller's motion to the Brussels Court of Appeal, who have eight days to decide whether or not the investigating judge should be removed from the case. In June 2023 the office of Tarabella was raided by police for the first time.

==== Andrea Cozzolino ====
Andrea Cozzolino's legal immunity was also removed by the European Parliament on 2 February 2023, when Andrea Cozzolino was in Italy. Cozzolino was arrested on 10 February 2023, after leaving a hospital in Naples where he was being treated for heart problems; he was taken to Poggioreale prison, but later allowed to go home under house-arrest. Cozzolino's lawyer Dimitri De Béco issued a statement that Cozzolino opposed being extradited to Belgium, because of the Belgian justice "way of proceeding". Cozzolino has repeatedly denied any wrong-doing. On 14 February, a Naples court granted a request from Cozzolino's lawyers to postpone the extradition hearing to 28 February so that the court could check the prison in Belgium that Cozzolino would be put in if extradited. In June he flew to Brussels and was placed by a Judge on parole, with conditions attached.

=== Also arrested ===
==== Luca Visentini ====
Visentini was detained on 9 December 2022 and released without charge two days later. In a statement issued through the ITUC, he replied to the allegations by proclaiming his innocence and "reconfirming his absolutely commit[ment] to the fight against corruption" He also commented specifically on his confession in relation to receiving two payments from the NGO Fight Impunity of €50,000 and €60,000 by stating the monies were in relation to his campaign to become the General-Secretary of ITUC and that "it was in no way connected to a corruption attempt or aimed at influencing my position on Qatar." In March 2023 he was dismissed as general-secretary of the ITUC.

== Post-scandal changes ==
The European Commission did not have a standardised set of rules to cover gifts, travel, and hospitality offered by third parties. President von der Leyen supported such a set of rules in 2019; however, it was not proposed until June 2023 to create an ethics body to create and manage common rules of conduct.

The European Parliament's Special Committee on foreign interference and disinformation, and on strengthening integrity in the EP (ING2) adopted a set of recommendations to improve scrutiny, detection and sanction of such interference.

The European Parliament revised its rules of procedure and its code of conduct in September 2023, placing six main obligations on MEPs:

- Detailed declaration of private interests, including those from the 3 years prior to their election
- When external income exceeds €5,000, all the entities from which their income is received must be listed
- With regard to conflicts of interest, they must be resolved or declared
- Barred from engaging in paid lobbying activities linked directly to the EU's decision-making process
- Meetings with interested parties can only be with people who sign up to the EU's Transparency Register and make disclosure of such meetings and also of meetings held with representatives of third country diplomats
- Make a declaration of all assets and liabilities at the beginning, and again at the end, of every term of office.

Oversight of MEPs' compliance with the rules remained in the hands of the Parliament's Advisory Committee on the Conduct of Members, composed entirely of MEPs themselves.

== Other foreign interventions ==
Other European Parliament corruption scandals involve foreign interventions. Green Party MEP Viola von Cramon-Taubadel said that Kazakhstan, Azerbaijan and Russia also "systematically purchased influence over an extended period". In 2025 foreign interventions by China were investigated.

== See also ==
- Allegations of corruption and bribery related to the 2022 FIFA World Cup
- Azerbaijani laundromat, a complex money laundering scheme for money used to pay off European politicians.
- Cash for influence
- Caviar diplomacy, a lobbying strategy of Azerbaijan, consisting of costly invitations to foreign politicians.
- Censorship in the European Union
- Foreign relations of Qatar
- Influence peddling
- Qatari connection affair
- Russian Laundromat, possibly the world's largest money-laundering scheme.
- Sekunjalo Investments, largest donor to Fight Impunity.
