= Michel Claise =

Belgian writer, politician and retired investigating judge (born 1956)

Michel Claise (born 6 January 1956) is a Belgian writer, politician and retired investigating judge.

== Early life ==
Claise was raised by his grandparents, who ran a bakery and patisserie in Anderlecht, Brussels. He obtained a law degree from the Université libre de Bruxelles and began his career as a barrister in the chambers of Guy Uyttendaele.

== Investigating judge ==
In 1999, at the instigation of his wife, Claise sat the examination to become a magistrate. As an investigating judge, he specialised in financial crime.

He led investigations into tax fraud and money laundering involving the Swiss branch of HSBC, which was suspected of enabling wealthy Belgians to evade taxes using offshore companies in Panama and the Virgin Islands. The case was settled in 2019 for nearly €3 million. Other investigations involved Belgian banks Fortis and Belgolaise, insurance company AGF, and Euroclear Belgium. An operation against encrypted service SKY ECC led to numerous arrests of criminals and drug traffickers; another operation was against money-laundering by gangs in Belgian football clubs. He acquired the nicknames "the Sheriff" and "Mr Hundred Millions" for his success in pursuing criminals and returning large sums of money to the state.

In 2022, he was in charge of the investigation into Members of the European Parliament (MEPs) and their associates who were suspected of taking bribes from the governments of Qatar and Morocco, in what became known as Qatargate. In June 2023, Claise recused himself after the lawyer of MEP Marc Tarabella, one of the accused, raised allegations of a conflict of interest, as Claise's eldest son ran a company with the son of MEP Marie Arena, an associate of accused Antonio Panzeri. The Court of Appeal ruled, in February 2026, that there had been no conflict of interest, but Claise had in the meantime retired.

== Writing ==
Claise combined his career as an investigating judge with that of a writer of crime fiction and non-fiction. His debut novel, Salle des pas perdus, was published in 2006; his non-fiction work about financial crime, Essai sur la criminalité financière, Le club des Cassandre, appeared in 2015.

== Politics ==
Following his retirement, Claise entered politics and stood as a candidate for the DéFI party in the 2024 Belgian federal election. Third on the DéFI list for the Brussels constituency, he failed to get enough votes to secure a seat in the Chamber of Representatives, but later that year was elected as a local councillor in the Forest municipality of Brussels.
