= Eva Kaili =

Greek politician (born 1978)

- Εύα Καϊλή
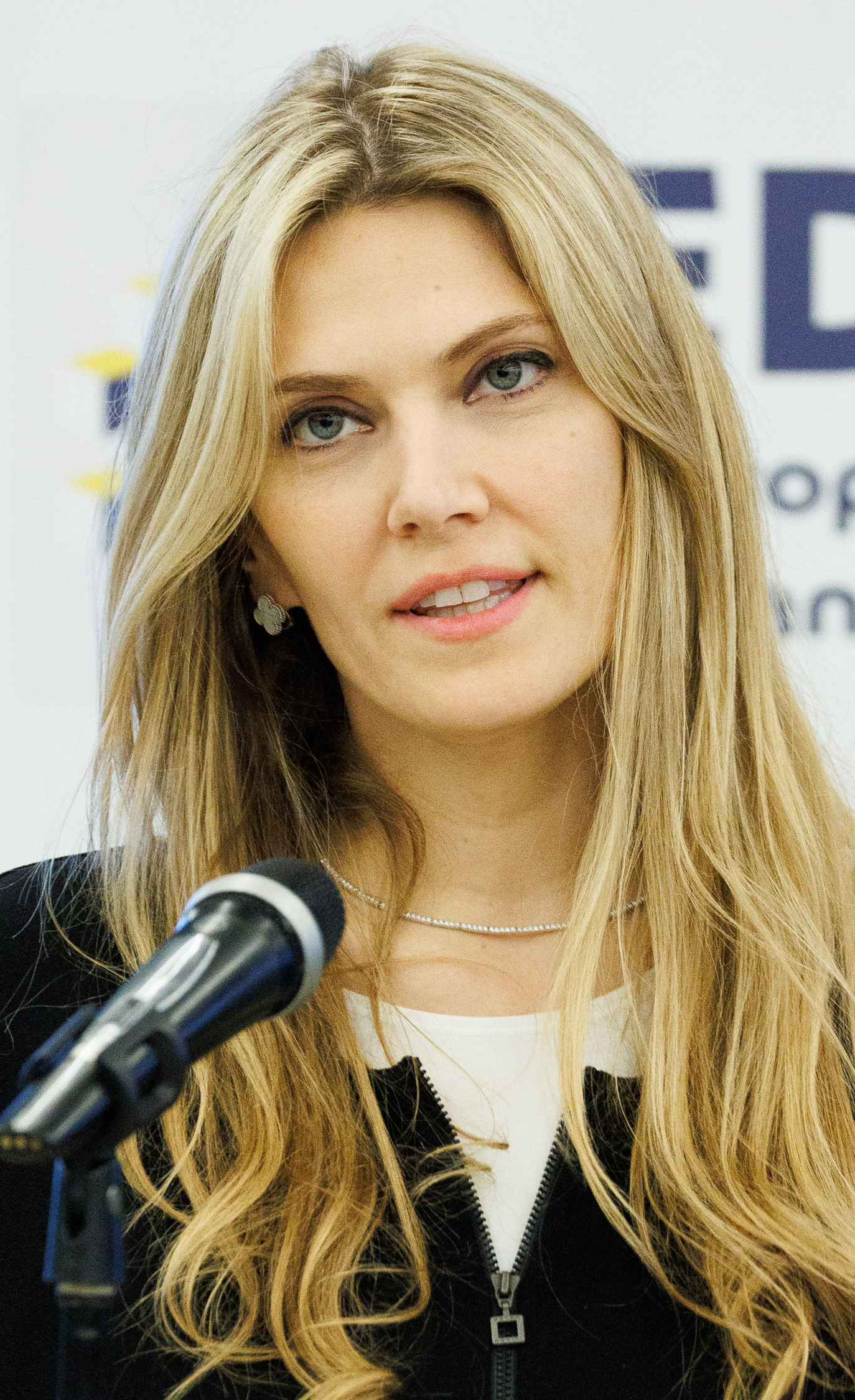
- Kaili in 2022

5th Vice President of the European Parliament
- In office 18 January 2022 – 13 December 2022 (Note: Suspended: 9 December 2022 – 13 December 2022) Serving with See list
- President: Roberta Metsola
- Succeeded by: Marc Angel

Member of the European Parliament for Greece
- In office 2 July 2014 – 16 July 2024
- Preceded by: Anni Podimata

Member of the Hellenic Parliament
- In office 18 September 2007 – 9 May 2012
- Succeeded by: Evangelos Venizelos
- Constituency: Thessaloniki A

Personal details
- Born: 26 October 1978 (age 47) Thessaloniki, Greece
- Party: PASOK (1992–2022)
- Other political affiliations: Progressive Alliance of Socialists and Democrats (2014–2022)
- Domestic partner: Francesco Giorgi
- Children: 1
- Education: Aristotle University of Thessaloniki
- Profession: Newscaster, politician
- Website: www.evakaili.gr
- Eva Kaili's voice On how she got into Bitcoin; Recorded June 2022

Evdoxia "Eva" Kaili (Greek: Ευδοξία "Εύα" Καϊλή; born 26 October 1978) is a Greek former politician who was a member of the European Parliament (MEP) from 2014 to 2024. She served as one of fourteen vice presidents of the European Parliament from January 2022 until she was arrested in December 2022 and charged with corruption as part of the Qatar corruption scandal at the European Parliament.

Kaili was a Member of the Hellenic Parliament from 2007 to 2012. Before her political career, she was a news presenter for Greek television channel MEGA Channel from 2004 to 2007. Following her arrest on 9 December 2022, Kaili was held in pre-trial detention in Brussels until 14 April 2023, when she was released to house arrest with an electronic bracelet, a measure that was lifted on 25 May 2023. Through her lawyers, Kaili denied all charges. In September 2023, she secured an internal inquiry into how evidence against her was collected; the Court of Appeal ruled in February 2026 that the investigation had been conducted properly. Kaili did not seek re-election in the 2024 European Parliament election.

== Early life and education ==
Kaili was born in October 1978 in Thessaloniki to parents Maria Ignatiadou and Alexandros Kailis. She has a younger sister, Madalena, (Note: Sometimes transliterated "Mantalena"; in Greek language voiced stops, nasalised voiced stops, and nasalised voiceless stops in borrowings and names from foreign languages (such as, d, nd, and nt) are all written ντ in Greek. See, as a way of example, Madalena (1960 film)) who is CEO of ELONTech, an organisation aligned to Kaili's parliamentary work on emerging technologies.

Kaili studied architecture and civil engineering at the Aristotle University of Thessaloniki. In 2001, she was President of the School of Architecture Students' Association. She continued her studies at the University of Piraeus where she obtained a Master of Arts degree in international and European affairs in 2008.

== Career ==
Kaili was a newscaster at Mega Channel from 2004 until 2007.

In 1992, Kaili joined the PASOK Youth. In 2002, she became the youngest member to be elected to the Thessaloniki City Council.

=== Member of the Hellenic Parliament ===
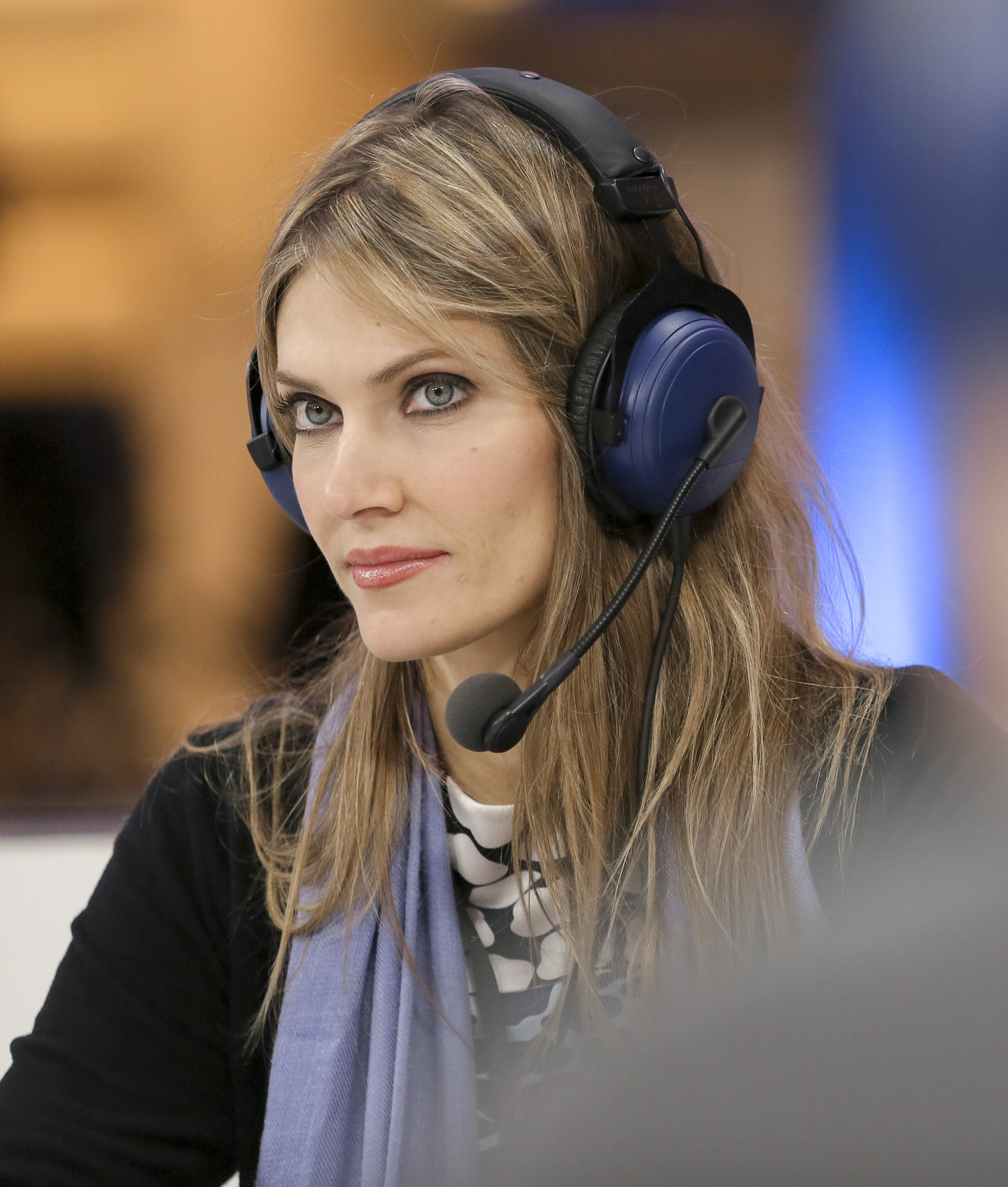
Kaili at a European Parliament debate on corruption in 2014

In the 2004 national elections, Kaili was the youngest candidate standing. In the 2007 national elections, she was elected as a member of the Hellenic Parliament for the first district of Thessaloniki. At the time, she was the youngest Member of Parliament with the PASOK party. She retained her seat in the 2009 national elections until 2012.

During her term in Parliament, Kaili served as a member of the following Parliamentary Committees: Standing Committee on Cultural and Educational Affairs, Standing Committee on National Defense and Foreign Affairs, and Special Permanent Committee of Greeks Abroad. She was also a member of the Greek delegation to the Parliamentary Assembly of the Organization of the Black Sea Economic Cooperation (BSEC), the NATO Parliamentary Assembly, and the Parliamentary Assembly of the Union for the Mediterranean.

Ahead of a crucial vote of confidence for Prime Minister, George Papandreou in November 2011, Kaili made headlines when she announced that she would refuse to support the government in the vote; this would have left Papandreou with the support of just 151 PASOK deputies out of 300. She later backtracked. Papandreou won the vote of confidence, with all 155 lawmakers of PASOK expressing their support for his beleaguered government.

=== Member of the European Parliament ===
Kaili was elected as a Member of the European Parliament in 2014 and was a member of the Progressive Alliance of Socialists and Democrats (S&D) group until her expulsion in December 2022. Between 2019 and 2022, Kaili had been the head of the Hellenic S&D delegation. She was vice president for Innovation Strategy, ICT, Technology, Foresight, Businesses, ESG and CSR, UN, WTO, OECD and the Middle East. She was the first woman Chair of the European Parliament's Science and Technology Options Assessment body (STOA) 2017–2022. She was also Chair of the Centre for Artificial Intelligence (C4AI), and Chair of the Delegation for relations with the NATO Parliamentary Assembly (DNAT) 2014–2019. She served on the Committee on Industry, Research and Energy (ITRE), the Committee on Economic and Monetary Affairs (ECON), and the Committee on Employment and Social Affairs (EMPL). She was an alternate member on the Committee on Budgets (BUDG) and on Delegation for relations with the Arabian Peninsula (DARP) and was also involved in the Commission investigating the spyware Pegasus (PEGA).

In addition to her committee assignments, Kaili was a member of the European Parliament Intergroup on Cancer, the European Parliament Intergroup on Disability, the Delegation to the EU-Russia Parliamentary Cooperation Committee (D-RU) and the Delegation for Relations with the United States of America (D-US). She was the recipient of a 2018 MEP Award for New Technologies.

Kaili became one of fourteen vice presidents of the European Parliament on 18 January 2022 after being elected on the first round by 454 votes. She was suspended from her vice-presidential duties on 10 December 2022, following her arrest. On 13 December 2022, the European Parliament voted to remove Kaili from her position as one of their vice presidents, with 625 votes in favour of removal, one against, and two abstentions.

In February 2024, Kaili announced she would not run for re-election as an MEP.

=== Arrest and corruption charges ===
On 9 December 2022, Kaili was arrested by Belgian Federal Police following an investigation into organized crime, corruption and money laundering tied to lobbying efforts in support of Qatar. Because Kaili enjoyed parliamentary immunity, her arrest was not on the original planning of the operation launched by Belgian authorities that day, but developments during the day led investigating judge Michel Claise (overall head of the operation) to conclude that Kaili was caught in flagrante delicto. A suitcase of cash was found with her father upon his arrest, and bags of cash were found at her home. The same day she was suspended from both the Socialists and Democratic Group with which she sat in the European Parliament and her national party PASOK. As part of the investigation, Belgian Police raided 16 homes and detained at least four others including parliamentary assistant Francesco Giorgi (Kaili's partner), Antonio Panzeri (an Italian former MEP and former Chair of the European Parliament Human Rights Subcommittee, for whom Giorgi had worked in parliament, and with whom he had founded the human rights NGO "Fight Impunity"), and Kaili's father, Alexandros Kailis, who was arrested outside the hotel where he was staying with a suitcase of cash. During the raids over €600,000 in cash was recovered by investigators.

The arrest of Alexandros Kailis outside his hotel with the suitcase of cash led investigating judge Claise to decide that this was a case of Kaili being caught In flagrante delicto; a special police team of around a dozen officers, accompanied by judge Claise in person, then headed for the home of Kaili and arrested her. Kaili did not resist, but was visibly shaken and in a state of shock and confusion, crying; Claise questioned her for more than five hours.

Kaili's lawyers, André Risopoulos and Michalis Dimitrakopoulos, described the actions of Belgian authorities as a gross overreach of judicial power. In an interview with Italian newspaper Corriere della Sera, Dimitrakopoulos said that Kaili's arrest and initial interrogations were problematic because she was in a state of shock, fear and confusion and that the Belgian authorities failed to provide her with a reliable French-language interpreter. The lawyer further claimed that it was only after a week that Kaili could testify "in a calm environment", where she was "in good enough psychological condition to be fully aware of what she was saying", and that it was "the first time she had a good interpreter".

On 12 December 2022, the Greek Anti-Money Laundering Authority announced that it had frozen all assets of Kaili and her close family members. This included all bank accounts, safes, companies and other financial assets. Of particular interest to the authorities, according to the head of the Anti-Money Laundering Authority, was a newly established real estate company in the Athens district of Kolonaki.

The timing of the arrests coincided with the 2022 FIFA World Cup being hosted in Qatar. At the time, there was significant criticism of the hosts within the European Union, but during a speech at the European Parliament, Kaili praised the country's human rights record and criticised accusations of corruption made against Qatar.

On 5 January 2023, Kaili, from where she was held in Haren Prison outside Brussels, complained about her treatment by the Belgian authorities, in particular in delays regarding a visit from her daughter. Kaili said: "I am being tortured, this is so unfair that I cannot stand it, and I am breaking down. What is the problem with my little girl, why are they keeping her away from me?". (Note: "Βασανίζομαι. Είναι άδικο αυτό. Δεν αντέχω. Καταρρέω. Τι τους φταίει η μικρή και την κρατάνε μακριά μου." [I am being tortured, this is so unfair that I cannot stand it, and I am breaking down. What is the problem with my little girl, why are they keeping her away from me?]) The authorities responded by permitting Kaili to have a three-hour meeting with her 22-month-old daughter in prison on the afternoon of 6 January; this was the first time Kaili had seen her daughter since her arrest in December. Kaili's father, Alexandros Kailis, brought the child to Haren Prison. Panzeri agreed to a plea deal, while Giorgi admitted his role in the scheme.

While detained, Kaili was monitored by Haren Prison's in-house psychologists. Kaili declined to exercise her right, under Belgian law, to meet with a psychologist; however, Haren Prison staff judged it necessary for her. The psychologists were also present during Kaili's meeting with her daughter. Kaili's lawyers claimed that Belgian authorities were to blame for any psychological harm done to Kaili, especially in her early interrogations, which the lawyers contested as being legally problematic.

On 19 January 2023, a scheduled hearing of the Court of First Instance in Brussels rejected Kaili's application to be freed from pre-trial detention and instead placed under alternative measures, such as an electronic bracelet. Dimitrakopoulos said: "For 16 hours she was in a police cell, and not in the prison. ... She was refused a second blanket. They took her jacket. This is torture". "The light was on all the time. She couldn't sleep." Risopoulos said that Kaili had been held in solitary confinement from 11 to 13 January 2023. In response to these statements by Kaili's lawyers, a spokesperson of the Belgian Federal Prosecutor's Office said: "I haven't heard anything about this in the file or at any other time".

A subsequent hearing on 16 February 2023 again rejected Kaili's request to be freed or placed under alternative measures, and decided that she should remain in pre-trial detention. Kaili had changed her Belgian lawyer from Risopoulos to Sven Mary some time before the hearing.

Kaili was released from pre-trial detention to house arrest with an electronic bracelet on 14 April 2023. One of the main reasons that led to her release was that her fingerprints were not found on the cash confiscated during the raids, while those of Kaili's co-defendants Antonio Panzeri and Francesco Giorgi were found. Her Belgian lawyer, Mary, said: "I will not comment further, other than the fact that this is a sensible decision that has been too long in coming." On 25 May, Kaili's application to lift her house arrest and obligation to wear an electronic bracelet was successful; the release being subject to the usual conditions in such cases, as announced by the Belgian Federal Prosecutor's Office.

In June 2023, Claise, the judge who had ordered Kaili's arrest and detention, recused himself from the case due to allegations of conflict of interest after it emerged that his son was co-owner of a company with Ugo Lemaire, the son of MEP Marie Arena. In September 2023, Kaili's lawyers secured an internal investigation into how evidence against her was collected and whether her parliamentary immunity was breached. In February 2026, judges of the Court of Appeal rejected the arguments of defence lawyers that the investigation was flawed. They ruled that Kaili's parliamentary immunity had not been breached and that the investigating judge had not had a conflict of interest.

=== Belgiangate ===
In media interviews, Kaili and her lawyer Sven Mary protested her innocence and coined the term "Belgiangate" to describe the investigation into corruption, which they said was flawed. Kaili told the Financial Times, in relation to the suitcase full of cash she had given her father: "This is something to discuss with Francesco and Panzeri, with Arena, with other people" and added that money is not illegal. She accused the Belgian authorities of having violated her rights.

=== Expenses fraud investigation ===
In April 2023, Politico reported that Kaili was facing an additional criminal investigation for expenses fraud involving four former parliamentary assistants between 2014 and 2020. The investigation was looking at whether she took a cut of their salaries and their expenses for fabricated work trips and for work that was not carried out. In February 2024, the European Parliament voted to remove Kaili's parliamentary immunity in relation to the investigation, which is thought to involve a sum of €120,000 to €150,000.

=== Controversies inside PASOK ===
Even before her arrest, Kaili was a controversial figure inside the Panhellenic Socialist Movement (PASOK), since she had regularly distanced herself from PASOK and adopted positions similar to those of Greek conservative parties. Following her arrest, PASOK president Nikos Androulakis described her as "a Trojan horse of New Democracy", and announced that she would not be a candidate for PASOK again.

In 2021 she was rumoured to plan a bid for the presidency of PASOK.

== Personal life ==
Kaili and her partner Francesco Giorgi, a former parliamentary assistant, have a daughter born in 2021.
