= Sven Mary =

Belgian lawyer

Sven Mary (born November 1971) is a Belgian lawyer, best known for representing notorious criminals such as Salah Abdeslam and for defending Eva Kaili, Greek Member of the European Parliament, against charges of corruption as part of the Qatar corruption scandal at the European Parliament.

== Early life ==
Mary was born in Antwerp in November 1971, son of businessman and former director of VRT, Tony Mary. In his youth he played football for the junior team at Anderlecht, but had to give up following an injury. He studied law at the Vrije Universiteit Brussel, having to repeat his first year three times.

== Career ==
Mary has been described the "star of the Belgian Bar". He earned the nickname “scumbags’ lawyer” (French: avocat des crapules) for having represented several high-profile criminals.

Early in his career he defended Michel Lelievre, an accomplice of Belgian serial killer Marc Dutroux. Another client was Fouad Belkacem, leader and spokesperson of the terrorist organisation Sharia4Belgium. Mary came to international attention when he represented Salah Abdeslam, the sole surviving member of the 10-man unit that carried out the attacks in Paris on 13 November 2015, following his arrest in Molenbeek on 18 March 2016. Mary and French lawyer Frank Berton defended Abdeslam when he went on trial in Brussels in February 2018 for his part in a shoot-out with police in Forest that happened a few days before his arrest. Mary argued that Abdeslam should be acquitted on a technicality, but Adbdeslam was found guilty and given a 20-year prison sentence.

He also represented French actor Jean-Paul Belmondo in civil cases.

In February 2023 Mary took over the defence of Eva Kaili, Greek Member of the European Parliament who was being held on charges of corruption as part of the Qatargate scandal.

== Publications ==
Mary is the author of:

- L'avocat rebelle, Kennes Editions, 2021, ISBN 9782380751413
- Défendre l'indéfendable, Kennes Editions, 2021, ISBN 9782380751413

== Personal life ==
Mary is divorced and has two daughters.
