= Tony Mary =

Belgian businessman (born 1950)

- Born: 1950 (age 75–76)
- Education: Master's degree in economics at the Vrije Universiteit Brussel
- Children: Sven Mary

Tony Mary (born 1950) is a Belgian businessman.

== Education ==
He received a master's degree in economics at the Vrije Universiteit Brussel in 1973.

== Career ==
He started his career at IBM, where he became Country General Manager for IBM Belgium and Luxemburg in 1990. In 1993 he founded Synergia, which he led until July 1995. From August 1995 until May 1997, he was General Manager of Belgacom. From June 1997 until December 1998 he was President Europe of SITEL Corporation. Tony Mary was Senior Executive Vice President of Groupe Bull from January 1999 until December 1999. From January 2000 until July 2002 he was Managing Partner of KPMG. He succeeded Bert De Graeve in 2002 as president and CEO of the VRT and remained in office from August 2002 until September 2006. Since 2000 he has been an independent director and member of the audit committee of Vivium and several other companies.

== Personal life ==
Mary is the father of lawyer Sven Mary.

== Sources ==
- Tony Mary bestuurder bij Memnon
- Tony Mary (VUB)
- "Belgium VRT drops ceo". Variety (magazine). September 2006.
