= Véronique Courjault =

French criminal (born 1968)

- Born: Véronique Fièvre; October 19, 1967 (age 58); Maine-et-Loire, Pays de la Loire, France
- Convictions: Murder, infanticide
- Penalty: 8 years imprisonment

Details
- Victims: 3
- Span of crimes: 1999–2003
- Country: France; South Korea

Véronique Courjault (née Fièvre; born October 19, 1967) is a French woman who confessed to killing three of her newborn children. Two of the infants were found stored in a freezer at her home, a case that drew significant media attention. This case became widely known in the media as the "affaire des bébés congelés" ("frozen babies case").

== The Courjault family ==
Véronique Courjault (born October 19, 1967, in Maine-et-Loire, France) is married to engineer Jean-Louis Courjault (born December 10, 1966). The couple had originally met as students in Poitiers in 1987, they married on November 12, 1994 and had two sons, Jules born on March 19, 1995, and Nicholas, born September 1996.

In 2002, the family relocated to Seoul, South Korea, due to Jean-Louis's professional commitments, while maintaining a residence in the French city of Tours.

== Chronology of events ==
On 23 July 2006, Jean-Louis Courjault, returning to Seoul after vacationing in France, discovered two infant corpses in the family freezer. A few days later, DNA tests conducted by South Korean authorities confirmed that the infants were those of the Courjaults.

On 22 August 2006, Jean-Louis and Véronique Courjault held a press conference during which the couple contested the DNA results. They also accused the media of acting as a "lynch mob" in conspiracy with Jean-Louis's commercial rivals.

The case was transferred to France, where new DNA tests were ordered. On 12 October 2006, Véronique Courjault admitted to killing both infants and freezing their remains after giving birth to them in South Korea in 2002 and 2003. She also confessed to killing a third infant and burning its body in a fireplace in 1999, while the couple still lived in France.

In January 2009, the case against Jean-Louis Courjault was dismissed. He publicly stated that he had never been aware of his wife's pregnancies and explained that she had concealed them from him by wearing loose clothing and using a process known as denial of pregnancy.

On 18 June 2009, Véronique Courjault was found guilty of murdering her three infants by a French court and was sentenced to eight years in prison.

A significant debate emerged in the Francophone press during the summer of 2009, focusing on the basis for Courjault's denial of the pregnancies and whether she had deliberately deceived her husband with the intention of murdering the infants. Swiss television (TSR) in Geneva aired an interview with American child psychiatrist Daniel Schechter, a specialist in the diagnosis and treatment of peripartum psychopathology. Schechter described "denial of pregnancy" as a serious symptom of a psychiatric disturbance that can have several possible etiologies.

Véronique Courjault was released from jail on 17 May 2010, after serving almost four years behind bars.

== See also ==
- Infanticide
- Celine Lesage
- Dominique Cottrez
- Melissa Drexler
- List of serial killers by country
