= Céline Lesage =

French murderer

- Born: 1971 (age 54–55); France
- Conviction: Murder
- Penalty: 15 years in prison

Details
- Victims: 6
- Span of crimes: 2000–2007
- Country: France
- State: Normandie
- Date apprehended: October 2007

Céline Lesage (born 1971) is a French woman found guilty in 2010 of murdering six of her newborn babies between 2000 and 2007. She suffocated four and strangled two. On October 19, 2007, a new boyfriend, Luc Margueritte, found the six bodies in the basement of the apartment he and Lesage were sharing. She was sentenced to 15 years in prison for the murders.

== See also ==
- Infanticide
- Véronique Courjault
- Dominique Cottrez
- List of French serial killers
