= Elisabetta Gualmini =

Italian politician

Elisabetta Gualmini MEP
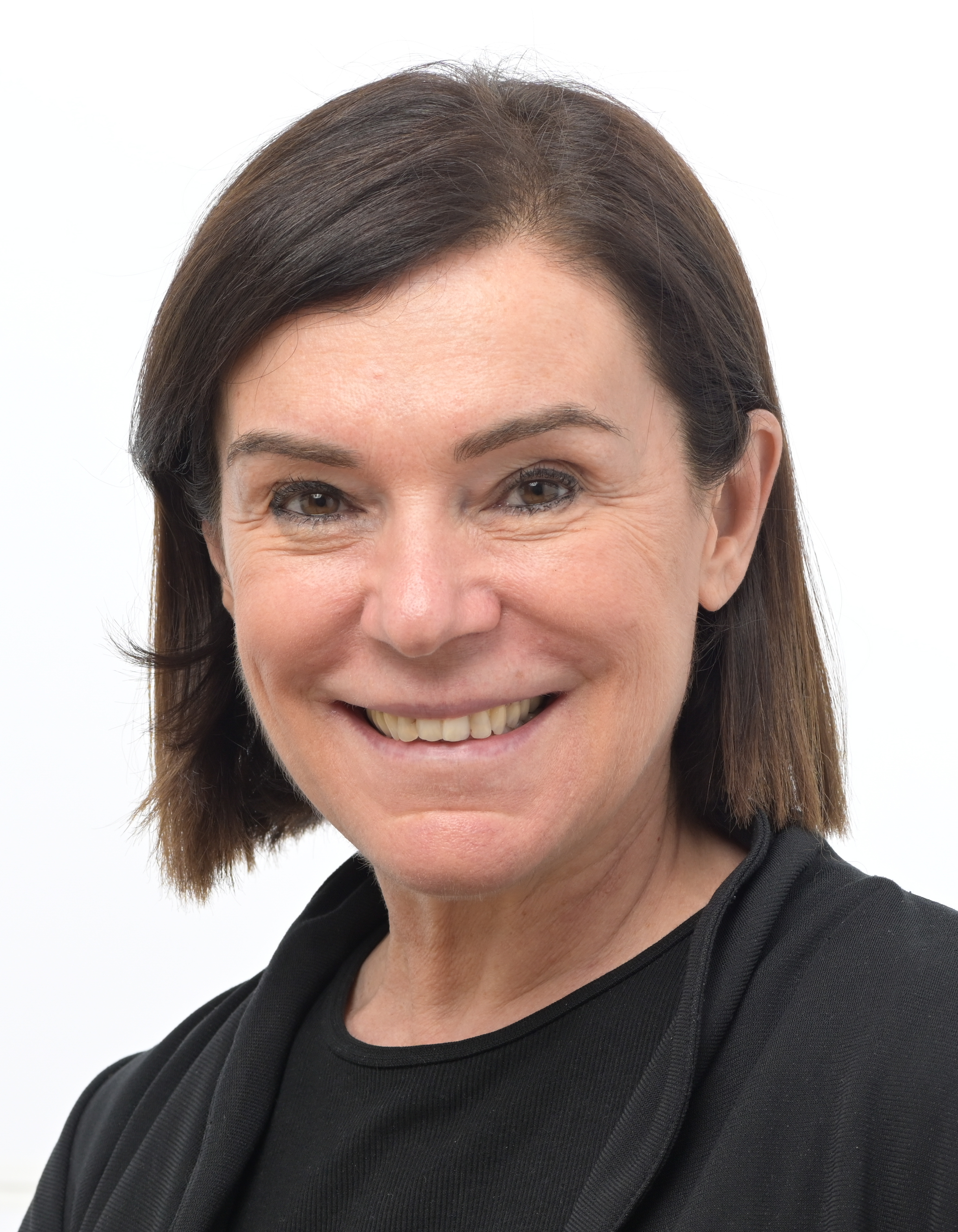

Member of the European Parliament for North-East Italy
- Incumbent
- Assumed office 2 July 2019

Personal details
- Born: 17 May 1968 (age 58) Modena, Italy
- Party: Action (since 2026); Democratic Party (2014–2026)
- Other political affiliations: Renew Europe (since 2026); S&D (2019–2026)
- Spouse: Salvatore Vassallo
- Children: 2
- Education: University of Bologna (degree); University of Florence (PhD)
- Profession: University professor

Elisabetta Gualmini (born 17 May 1968 in Modena) is an Italian politician who was elected as a Member of the European Parliament in 2019.

== Political career ==
In parliament, Gualmini has been serving on the Committee on Budgets and on the Committee on Employment and Social Affairs since 2019. In this capacity, she has been the parliament’s rapporteur on the European Commission’s 2020 proposal for a directive to improve platform workers’ working conditions.

In addition to her committee assignments, Gualmini is part of the Parliament's delegation to the EU-Russia Parliamentary Cooperation Committee. She is also a member of the European Parliament Intergroup on Anti-Racism and Diversity, the European Parliament Intergroup on Western Sahara and the European Parliament Intergroup on Fighting against Poverty.

In 2025, Gualmini would be suspended from the S&D group due to the Qatargate scandal. In 2026, Gualmini left PD to join Action. Upon joining the party, she also decided to leave S&D in favor of Renew Europe.
