= Salah Abdeslam =

Belgian-born French terrorist (born 1989)

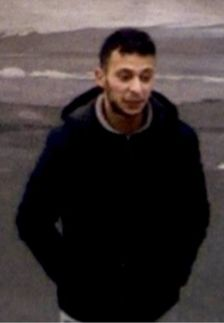
- Abdeslam on 14 November 2015
- Born: 15 September 1989 (age 37); Brussels, Belgium
- Known for: November 2015 Paris attacks 2016 Brussels bombings
- Convictions: Terrorism, murder, attempted murder
- Penalty: Belgium: 20 years in prison; France: life imprisonment without parole

Salah Abdeslam (French: [sala abdɛslam]; born 15 September 1989) is a Belgian-born Islamic terrorist who was sentenced to life in prison in France in 2022 as the only surviving member of a 10-man unit that carried out attacks in Paris on 13 November 2015, in which 130 people were killed and more than 490 injured.

Abdeslam was born and raised in the Molenbeek district of Brussels. His family was of Moroccan origin but had acquired French nationality, which they passed on to their children. Abdeslam worked for two years at the Brussels public transport company STIB-MIVB until he drifted into petty crime and unemployment. From 2013, he helped his brother Brahim Abdeslam, who was a suicide bomber in the Paris attacks, run a Molenbeek café-bar which was a centre for drug dealing and watching Islamic State videos.

In the months preceding the Paris attacks, Abdeslam drove to Hungary and Germany to collect members of the Brussels Islamic State terror cell who were returning from Syria via the migrant route. He also purchased material for making explosives. In the days before the attacks, he went to Paris to arrange accommodation for the attackers. On the evening of 13 November 2015, Abdeslam drove three of the unit to the Stade de France football stadium which was the location of their bombing. He subsequently failed to detonate his own suicide vest, abandoning his car, and called friends to collect him and take him back to Brussels, where he went into hiding. On 15 March 2016, police raided a property in the Forest district of Brussels, where Abdeslam was hiding with two other members of the terrorist cell. One of them was killed during the shootout, while Abdeslam and the third man escaped from a back window. Abdeslam was arrested on 18 March 2016 in Molenbeek and extradited back to France.

In 2018, Abdeslam was sentenced to 20 years in prison for his part in the Forest shootout in Brussels. In September 2021, he stood trial in Paris. During the trial, he spoke for the first time about his role in the attacks, having maintained his right to silence since 2016. He said he had not killed anyone and claimed he had decided not to detonate his explosives at the last minute. After a ten-month trial, he was found guilty of all charges including terrorism and murder and sentenced to a full-life term of imprisonment. In December 2022, he stood trial in Brussels charged with involvement in the planning of the 2016 Brussels bombings, which took place four days after his arrest. The jury returned a verdict of guilty in July 2023.

== Personal background ==
Abdeslam was born in the Brussels district of Molenbeek on 15 September 1989 to parents who came from Morocco and who had acquired French nationality after living in Algeria. Abdeslam and his three older brothers and younger sister were therefore born with French nationality. One brother, Brahim, also took part in the Paris attacks, shooting people on café terraces and then detonating his suicide vest. Abdeslam attended the Athénée Royal Serge Creuz secondary school in Molenbeek. After gaining a technical qualification, he found employment in 2009 as a mechanic with STIB-MIVB, where his father also worked. In December 2011, Abdeslam, together with childhood friend Abdelhamid Abaaoud and two others, was arrested for an attempted robbery on a garage in Ottignies to the south of Brussels. He was given a suspended sentence, but the months he had spent in prison on remand had cost him his job. He then alternated temporary work with unemployment and, from 2013, helped his brother Brahim run his Molenbeek café-bar, Café Les Béguines, which was a centre for drug dealing and watching Islamic State videos. Abdeslam drank alcohol, used cannabis, and frequented nightclubs and casinos. He acquired a further two convictions, one for theft and one for possession of cannabis. The café-bar was closed nine days before the 13 November attacks, after a police raid in August 2015 had found evidence of drug dealing on the premises. In the meantime the brothers had sold the lease. Both brothers lived at home with their parents and another brother, Mohammed, who had noticed that in the months before the Paris attacks they had changed, giving up alcohol and starting to pray.

After the police raid on terrorists in Verviers in January 2015, the names of Abdeslam and his brother Brahim were given to police by an informant. The brothers were questioned but the investigation was not followed up due to a lack of resources at the anti-terror unit of the federal police. Abdeslam and his brother Brahim were also named on a list of people suspected of having become radicalised, which was provided to the mayor of Molenbeek by the Belgian intelligence services on 26 October 2015. The mayor said that she did not use the list to track down possible terrorists, adding that it was the responsibility of the federal police.

== Preparations for the attacks ==
At the beginning of August 2015, Abdeslam made a very brief trip to Greece together with Ahmed Dahmani (arrested in Turkey in November 2015). Between 30 August and 3 October, Abdeslam made five journeys to Hungary and Germany to collect terrorists who were returning from Syria with false passports on the migrant route, all of whom would be involved with the terrorist attacks in Paris and Brussels. The cars in which they travelled were rented with cash provided by the Islamic State. In October 2015, Abdeslam purchased twelve remote detonators and a number of batteries from a fireworks shop in Saint-Ouen-l'Aumône in the northwestern suburbs of Paris. He also bought 15 litres of peroxide to use in the fabrication of explosives.

Abdeslam rented two of the three cars used in the Paris attacks, a Volkswagen Polo and a Renault Clio, while his brother Brahim rented the third, a SEAT León. On the evening of 11 November 2015, Abdeslam and childhood friend Mohamed Abrini drove in the Clio to Alfortville in the southeastern suburbs of Paris in order to book two rooms for the Paris attackers at an Apart'City hotel, being filmed by a surveillance camera at a service station on the route. His brother Brahim had already rented a house in Bobigny in the northeastern suburbs of Paris, near the Stade de France. In the early hours of 12 November, Abdeslam drove to a hideout in Charleroi to meet up with Abaaoud, Abrini, and other members of the terrorist cell. That afternoon they set off for Paris in the Clio and the SEAT León, being joined by another group in the Polo leaving from a hideout in the Jette district of Brussels. On reaching Paris, the Clio and SEAT León headed for the Bobigny house, while the Bataclan attackers in the Polo spent the night in the Alfortville hotel. During the night, Abrini returned to Brussels in a taxi, leaving ten men to carry out the attacks.

== Paris attacks ==
On the evening of 13 November 2015, Abdeslam drove the three Stade de France bombers to the football stadium just north of Paris in the commune of Saint-Denis. The detonation of the first bomb at 21.16 marked the start of a night of coordinated attacks that would leave 130 dead and hundreds wounded. The three bombs detonated at the Stade de France left one dead. Abaaoud, Chakib Akrouh and Brahim Abdeslam drove through the 10th and 11th arrondissements (districts) of Paris, stopping at three junctions to open fire upon people on café and restaurant terraces, killing 39 people. Brahim Abdeslam then detonated a suicide vest in a café in the 11th arrondissement. The third group of terrorists carried out an attack on the Bataclan theatre, where the Eagles of Death Metal were playing to a packed audience of about 1,500. Ninety people were killed by gunfire. The final death toll of the attacks was 130. The three Stade de France bombers, Brahim Abdeslam, and the three Bataclan attackers died on 13 November 2015 and Abaaoud and Akrouh were killed during a police raid on their hideout in Saint Denis on 18 November 2015, leaving Abdeslam as the sole survivor out of the attackers.

Abdeslam was wearing a suicide vest on the evening of 13 November. During the trial in Paris, he claimed that he had gone into a bar in 18th arrondissement with the intention of detonating the suicide vest, but had changed his mind at the last minute. The court did not believe him, deciding rather that the suicide vest was faulty. On 14 November 2015, the Islamic State claimed responsibility for the attacks, including one in the 18th arrondissement that had not happened. At about 10 pm, Abdeslam parked his car in the Place Albert Kahn in the 18th arrondissement, leaving a kitchen knife in it. Half an hour later, he activated a phone with a SIM card he had bought nearby, which allowed investigators to trace his movements for the rest of the night. He took the metro or a taxi to Châtillon in the southwest of Paris, where he abandoned his suicide vest amongst some rubbish and bought a McDonald's takeaway. He then spent a couple of hours with two youths in the stairwell of a block of flats. During the night, he called upon two friends from Molenbeek, Mohamed Amri and Hamza Attou, to pick him up and take him back to Brussels.

Amri and Attou arrived in Chatillon at around 5 am and drove Abdeslam back to Brussels. En route, they were captured on the surveillance camera of a service station. They passed two check points unhindered because, although by that time Abdeslam's name had been found on the rental documents of the car used by Bataclan attackers and left outside the theatre, it had not yet been put on all police computers. Once back in Brussels, Abdeslam bought new clothes and a phone and visited a barber to change his appearance. Another friend, Ali Oulkadi, then drove him to a hideout in the district of Schaerbeek.

== Manhunt and arrest ==
French and Belgian authorities released Abdeslam's photo and name on 15 November 2015 and he became Europe's most wanted man. His brother Mohammed, who was briefly arrested in Molenbeek on 14 November and released without charge, appealed to him to give himself up. Mohammed Abdeslam said that he had not noticed any signs of radicalisation in his brothers Salah and Brahim, although they had recently become more religious. In spite of being the focus of a huge manhunt, Abdeslam managed to evade capture for four months. He spent two weeks in a hideout on Rue Henri Bergé/Henri Bergéstraat in Schaerbeek with other members of the Brussels terrorist cell, who were plotting further attacks. He then spent a few days in another hideout on Avenue de l'Exposition/Tentoonstellingslaan in the district of Jette before being moved to 60 Rue du Dries/Driesstraat in the district of Forest.

On 15 March 2016, Belgian and French police conducted an anti-terrorist raid on the flat in Forest, expecting it to be empty as the power had been cut off. They were met with gunfire and called for reinforcements. While gunman Mohamed Belkaid held off the police, Abdeslam and Tunisian Sofien Ayari escaped from a back window. Belkaid was killed by a police sniper; four police officers were injured. A cache of weapons and an Islamic State flag was found in the flat, along with Abdeslam's fingerprints. After escaping from the Forest raid, Abdeslam contacted a cousin, Abid Aberkan, who agreed to shelter him and Ayari in his mother's flat in Molenbeek. Aberkan was already under surveillance, which allowed police to track down Abdeslam.

On 18 March 2016, Abdeslam, together with Ayari, was arrested in an anti-terror police raid on a flat occupied by the Aberkan family, located at 79 Rue des Quatre-Vents/Vier-Winden-Straat in Molenbeek, close to the location of his childhood home. As he attempted to escape, he was shot in the leg.

== Detention and questioning ==
Following his arrest, Abdeslam was treated in hospital for a minor wound to his leg, and, the next day, was transferred to the high-security wing of Bruges Prison, having been charged with terrorist murder and participating in a terror group. He initially co-operated with investigators when questioned about his role in the Paris attacks on the day after his arrest and admitted to having rented hotel rooms and cars and driven three bombers to the Stade de France. He then decided to exercise his right to silence and refused to say anything when questioned immediately after the Brussels bombings on 22 March 2016, in which 32 people were killed and hundreds injured at Brussels Airport in Zaventem and on a train leaving Maalbeek/Maelbeek metro station in central Brussels. The attacks were carried out by the Brussels terrorist cell and were brought forward by Abdeslam's arrest. Prior to the attacks, he had only been questioned for about an hour, as he was recovering from surgery on his leg, and asked only about his role in the Paris attacks and not about imminent threats.

A month after his arrest, Abdeslam was transferred from Bruges Prison to Beveren Prison near Antwerp in order to prevent him communicating with Abrini, who had been transferred from Forest Prison to Bruges Prison. On 21 April, he was charged with attempted murder in connection with the shootout in Forest three days before his arrest. On 27 April, he was extradited to France under a European Arrest Warrant issued by France on 19 March 2016. He was placed under formal investigation for murder and attempted murder of a terrorist nature and transferred to Fleury-Mérogis Prison to the south of Paris. He was represented by Belgian lawyer Sven Mary and French lawyer Frank Berton.

== First Brussels trial ==
On 5 February 2018, Abdeslam and Ayari stood trial at the Palais de Justice in Brussels for attempted murder during the Forest shootout in which four police officers were injured. On the first day of the trial, Abdeslam attended court and explained why he would be refusing to answer questions, saying that his silence was his defence and claiming that the legal process was biased against Muslims. After the first day, he refused to attend the trial. His lawyer Sven Mary argued for acquittal on a technicality, saying that one of the court papers had wrongly been issued in French rather than Dutch. Abdeslam and Ayari were found guilty, and, on 23 April 2018, were sentenced to 20 years in prison, the penalty requested by the prosecution.

== Paris attacks trial ==
On 29 November 2019, after a four-year investigation, the French national anti-terrorism prosecutor's office charged Abdeslam and thirteen others in relation to the Paris attacks and issued a further six arrest warrants. The trial, starting on 8 September 2021 and lasting nearly ten months, took place in a specially constructed courtroom in the Palais de Justice, Paris, before five judges presided over by Jean-Louis Périès. Nineteen men were on trial alongside Abdeslam, including six being tried in their absence (Ahmed Dahmani being in prison in Turkey and five others presumed dead in Syria). The thirteen defendants in court with Abdeslam included Abrini, Ayari, Amri, Attou and Oulkadi. Abdeslam was defended by two French lawyers, Olivia Ronen and Martin Vettes.

At the beginning of the trial, Abdeslam was confrontational. When asked his profession, he said he was a fighter for the Islamic State. He went on to complain about the conditions in Fleury-Mérogis Prison, where he was kept in solitary confinement under 24 hour camera surveillance. During the second week of the trial, the defendants were given the opportunity to each make a short statement. Abdeslam claimed that the attacks were retaliation against France for bombing the Islamic State and "nothing personal", words which shocked the survivors and victims' relatives listening in court. As the trial progressed, Abdeslam's attitude underwent a change. In February 2022, he denied killing anyone and answered questions about his radicalisation. The court also read a statement from his former fiancé, who said he had not been a practising Muslim, had not observed Ramadan, and was not interested in politics. In April, he spoke for the first time about the night of the attacks, after having maintained his right to silence since soon after his arrest in 2016. He told the court that he had entered a bar in the 18th arrondissement of Paris with the intention of detonating his suicide vest but changed his mind at the last moment "out of humanity, not fear". The prosecution maintained that the device had malfunctioned. He ended by offering his apologies to the victims.

The prosecution asked for a full-life term of imprisonment for Abdeslam, arguing that his reintegration into society would be impossible given his ideology. In her closing speech for the defence, Ronen argued that Abdeslam had not personally killed anyone on the night of 13 November 2015 and that he was not a danger to society. Before the judges retired to consider their verdict, the defendants were allowed to address the court; Abdeslam said that he was not a killer and that a murder conviction would be an injustice.

The verdicts were announced on the evening of 29 June 2022. Abdeslam was found guilty of murder and terrorism and sentenced to a full-life term of imprisonment, meaning that he will only have a small chance of parole after thirty years. The court had not believed his testimony about his last-minute change of mind over detonating his suicide vest, instead accepting forensic evidence that it was not working. Of the other nineteen standing trial, eighteen were found guilty of terrorist offences while one was found guilty of only criminal offences. All were sentenced to prison terms, ranging from two years to life. Abrini, who had driven with Abdeslam to Paris, was sentenced to life imprisonment. Ayari, who had been arrested with Abdeslam, was sentenced to thirty years in prison for planning an attack on Schiphol Airport that was not carried out. Amri and Attou, who had collected Abdeslam from Paris after the attacks, were sentenced to eight and four years in prison respectively; Oulkadi, who had taken Abdeslam to a hideout on his return to Brussels, was sentenced to five years.

Abdeslam did not appeal his sentence. His lawyers disagreed with his decision not to appeal and declined to represent him in his forthcoming trial in Brussels; their place was taken by Belgian lawyers Delphine Paci, who had defended Attou in the Paris trial, and Michel Bouchat.

== Second Brussels trial ==
On 12 August 2019, Abdeslam had been formally charged with involvement in the Brussels bombings. After the conclusion of the Paris attacks trial, he was transferred from Fleury-Mérogis Prison in France to Ittre/Itter Prison south of Brussels to await trial for his part in the planning of the Brussels bombings.

The trial was scheduled to start in October 2022 but was delayed until December as the defence lawyers objected to the design of the box, which then had to be rebuilt. Nine men, including Abrini and Ayari, were on trial with Abdeslam. The trial, which lasted seven months, took place with a jury before presiding judge Laurence Massart in the Justitia building (the former headquarters of NATO) in Evere, Brussels. During the trial, Abdeslam and the other six detained defendants were held in Haren Prison, a few kilometres from the Justitia building. Verdicts were delivered on 25 July 2023, with Abdeslam convicted of terrorist-related murder and attempted murder. However, he did not receive a sentence, as he had already been sentenced to twenty years in prison for the Forest shoot-out. The court decided that the shoot-out and the terror attacks were connected, and, under Belgian law, a criminal cannot be given more than one sentence for connected crimes.

After the end of the trial, Abdeslam was due to be transferred back to France to continue serving his whole-life sentence for the Paris Attacks, but he appealed against the transfer. His lawyers argued that his whole-life sentence was "inhuman and degrading" and all his relatives were in Belgium; therefore the transfer would breach his human rights. The appeals court suspended the transfer. On 7 February 2024, Abdeslam was transferred back to France, as the Belgian prosecutor's office argued that the judicial agreement with France to return him after the trial took precedence over the appeal court's suspension of the transfer.
