= Frank Berton =

French attorney

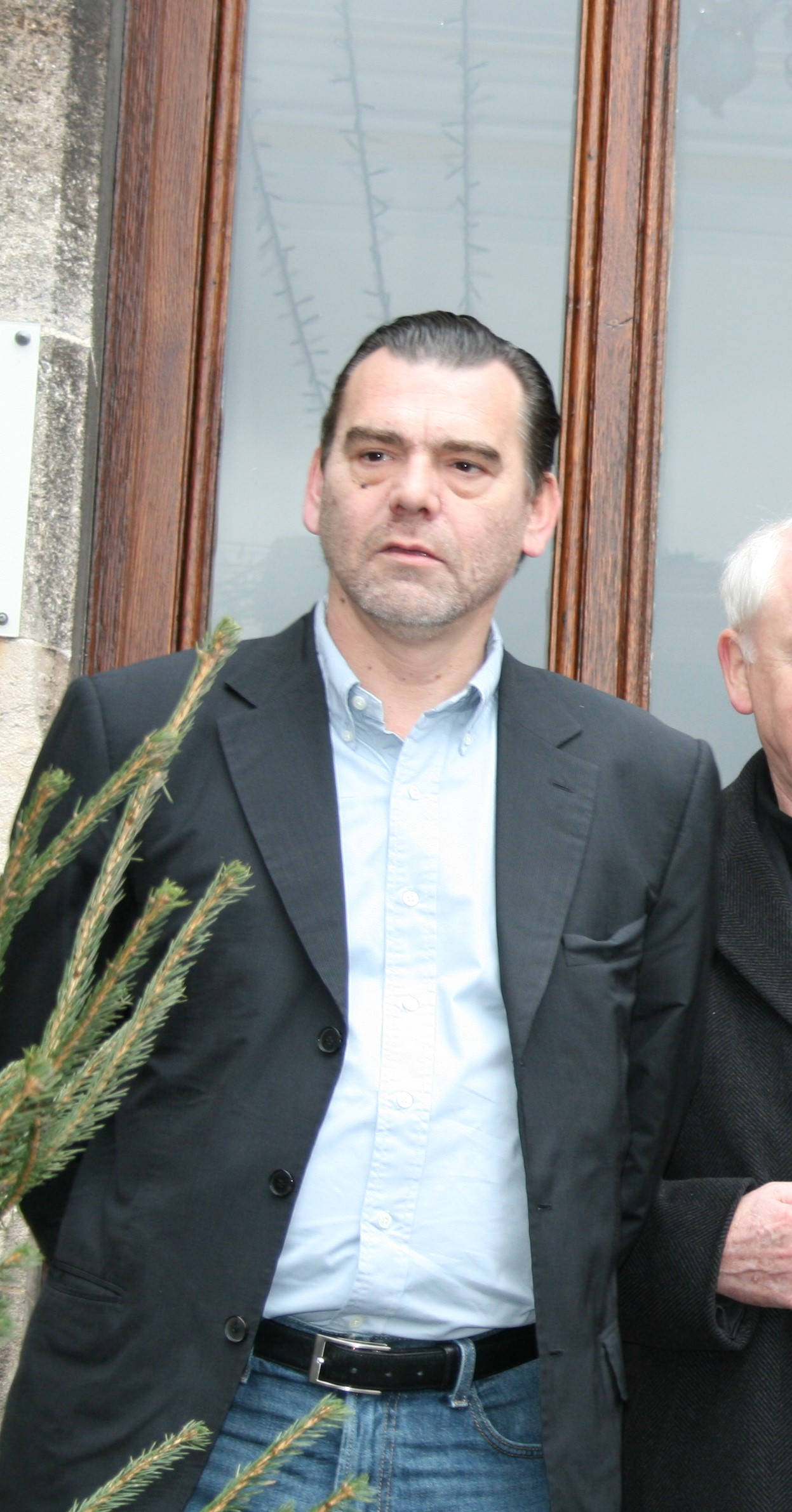
- Berton at a press conference in 2008
- Born: June 4, 1962 (age 64); Amiens, France
- Education: Lille 2 University of Health and Law (JD)
- Occupation: Lawyer
- Spouse: Bérangère Lecaille
- Children: Thomas, Martin, Eliot, and Adèle
- Website: www.jureo.fr

Frank Berton (born June 4, 1962) is a French attorney best known for his work with L'affaire d'Outreau (the Outreau trial) and the November 2015 Paris attacks. He specializes in Penal Law and Press Rights law.

== Biography ==
Frank Berton was born in 1962 in Amiens, France. Berton had a challenging childhood due to having a father who was violent towards him. Berton's father pressured him into going to business school. However, Berton had always known he wanted to be a lawyer and pursued his ambitions. During 1989, Berton was admitted into Lille 2 University of Health and Law. Berton has been on many highly publicized cases throughout his career and has gathered a strong reputation for himself. Berton has been hailed, "défense des français à l'étranger" or defender of French citizens abroad. Berton has a family consisting of four kids and a wife. His wife Bérangère Lecaille is also a French lawyer.

He became an "ambassador" for Prison Insider, an information platform on conditions of detention around the world, in 2024.

== Notable Cases ==
=== L'Affaire d'Outreau ===
The Outreau trial was a 2004 court trial in France that ended with the imprisonment of 18 people. However, in the following trials and appeals, it was found out that one of the imprisoned had committed perjury and this led to the false imprisonment of 14 people (one passed away in jail). Frank Berton was the lawyer for Odile Marécaux during the trial and successful appeal. This case had international attention and was included in newspapers like, The New York Times. There have also been documentaries made about this judicial mishap, one of these documentaries is called "Outreau, Autopsie d'un Désastre" directed by Jacques Renard.

=== L'Affaire Cottrez ===
The Affaire Cottrez was a large scandal where a French woman, Dominique Cottrez, was accused of committing the crime of infanticide. Cottrez was sentenced to 9 years in prison after being found guilty of killing 8 kids, 6 of which were found in her garage. Cottrez claimed that the children were born as a result of incest without her consent by her own father, which is why she ended their lives. Frank Berton along with Marie-Hélène Carlier were Cottrez's lawyers. In 2018, after serving part of her sentence, it was decided she was no longer a risk and she was free to be released.

=== Salah Abdeslam ===
Salah Abdeslam is suspected of being the only surviving terrorist that facilitated the November 2015 Paris attacks. Frank Berton was one of the lawyers that represented Salah Abdeslam. This was a highly publicized case due to the fact that 130 French people were killed in over 6 coordinated incidents. Berton made many public appearances during the trials and even invited to interviews with news sources like, France Info. This case is increasingly notable for Berton because in the face of incredible hatred and blame from the public towards Salah Abdeslam, he stood firm in his opinion that until a person is found guilty, he still deserves the right of a defense. Salah was found guilty and sentenced to 20 years of prison time at the end of court proceedings. Salah Abdeslam was held in custody with 24/7 surveillance, and this led to his refusal to talk to anyone, including his lawyers, in protest. This caused both Berton and his other lawyers to stop representing him.

=== Affaire Air Cocaïne ===
On the 20th of March, 2013, four French citizens were arrested in Punta Cana International Airport in the Dominican Republic. The police seized around 700 kg (1543 lbs) of Cocaine from their airplane. The scandal was named Affaire Air Cocaïne, or Air Cocaine Scandal by the media. Frank Berton and Philippe Screve were the defendants' lawyers. The trial ended with the four French citizens being sentenced to 20 years of prison time. However, the two pilots were acquitted on 8 July 2021 following an appeal.

== Autobiography ==
Frank Berton has an autobiography about his life and career that is set to come out in 2019. The book was written in collaboration with Elsa Vigoureux and the L'Obs. Berton has given some insight into the contents and has revealed that his work on high profile cases, like with Salah Abdeslam, will be detailed.
