= Haren Prison =

Prison in Brussels, Belgium

- Interactive map of Haren Prison
- Location: Haren, City of Brussels, Belgium; 50.89796°N 4.42541°E
- Status: Operational
- Capacity: 1,190
- Population: 264 (30 December 2022)
- Opened: 30 September 2022
- Managed by: Cafasso N.V.
- Director: Jurgen Van Poecke
- Website: www.gevangenisharenprison.be
- Building details

General information
- Cost: €382 million (inc VAT)

Technical details
- Grounds: 0.15 km^{2} (37 acres)

Design and construction
- Architects: EGM architects [buildings] EGM architects and B2Ai [layout] Baljon Landscape Architects [landscape]

Haren Prison (French: Prison de Haren; Dutch: Gevangenis van Haren) is a new prison in Haren in the north-eastern part of Brussels, Belgium. It is 9.8 kilometres (6.1 mi) from Brussels-South railway station, and is near Brussels Airport, Vilvoorde Viaduct and the planned Uplace shopping centre in Machelen in Flemish Brabant, just outside Brussels. It is said to be the largest prison complex ever built in Belgium, and is intended to replace the old Saint-Gilles Prison, Forest Prison and Berkendael Prison. Three cell wings in Saint-Gilles will remain in use until the end of 2024. The women's prison in Berkendael is being converted into a detention centre for about 60 short-term prisoners (imprisonment less than three years).

== Facilities ==
The Minister of Justice, Vincent Van Quickenborne, described Haren Prison as "a prison village, which will not only promote a new perspective on detention, with new functions such as that of security assistant and detention supervisor, but which is also more humane and fully focused on the empowerment and reintegration of detainees". (Note: "Een gevangenisdorp, dat niet alleen een nieuwe kijk op detentie zal promoten, met nieuwe functies zoals die van veiligheidsassistent en dententiebegeleider, maar dat ook menselijker is en volledig gericht is op de responsabilisering en re-integratie van gedetineerden".)

The prison site occupies 0.15 square kilometres (37 acres), has 105,000 m^{2} (126,000 sq yd) net floor space, and has a 1,200-metre-long (1,300 yd) perimeter wall. The prison's designed capacity is 1,190 inmates, and 1,000 prison staff. The cell blocks are designed for 30 inmates each; and consist of a communal living space next to three galleries (one per floor), each of ten cells. A central monitoring post connects groups of three cell blocks.

Each cell has its own toilet, a shower area where hot water is available twice for 5 minutes a day, a television that can receive four channels (RTBF, VRT, Euronews and Eurosport), a radio-alarm clock, a microwave oven, a small refrigerator, and a telephone. The distance from the cell door to the window is six steps. Some of the facilities in the cell are computer-controlled; each inmate has a badge that empowers them to choose whether the light in their cell is on or off, and to open the cell door at authorised times.

The prison is designed as a village, and has a centrally located "town hall" that includes the reception and visitors' area, a sports hall, the front office, and the sentence enforcement court; a pre-trial detention centre for men; a men's prison; a women's closed prison for 100 prisoners spread over three cell blocks (one of which includes five mother-child cells and has both an indoor and an outdoor playground); a women's open prison for 60 prisoners spread over six cell blocks (prisoners cook meals for themselves and live more independently than in the closed prison; there is a mother and child cell block); an observation institution; a psychiatric ward and medical centre; and workshops. Except where prisoners cook for themselves, meals are provided by the prison kitchen. Inmates can buy snacks and drinks from the canteen.

Though the prison design is intended as an alternative to the "Ducpétiaux"-type design, within the Federal Public Service Justice it is described as a "Ducpétiaux" prison, because it will function like a "Ducpétiaux"-type design even though it does not look like one. (Édouard Ducpétiaux was Inspector General of Prisons in Belgium in the 19th century. A "Ducpétiaux" prison had wing-shaped cell complexes controlled by a central supervisory core. "Ducpétiaux" cell complexes generally consisted of an open gallery with a maximum of three floors.)

The prison is designed to be environmentally friendly, and has received the BREEAM "very good" certificate. The prison uses underground heat pumps to cool the prison in summer and heat it in winter. The heat pumps work with a borehole energy storage field of 250 90-metre-deep (300 ft) boreholes. There are 140 solar panels on the roof of the "town hall". Some of the buildings have green rooves [gross area 22,500 m^{2} (5.6 acres) including pathways]. The prison is designed to use 77% less tap water than average; this is because 59% of non-potable water (for flushing toilets and irrigation) comes from collecting rainwater, and 41% from recovery and purification of grey water. The buildings are better insulated than required by current regulations (and twice as much better than the building regulations in force at the time the initial planning application was done). The buildings also have acoustic insulation, partly to reduce the propagation of knocking and impact noises, and partly to reduce the noise from Brussels Airport. Nevertheless, a journalist (Arnaud Gabriel) who was locked up in the prison for 36 hours complained about the noises that he could hear when he was locked in his cell: "the constant blower that stays in the head; the fridge that gets started; doors opening; prison officers' shoes on the stairs."

== History ==
Haren Prison was built as part of the implementation of a masterplan to combat overcrowding in Belgian prisons and to improve living conditions, which was approved by the Federal Council of Ministers in 2008 and has been updated several times since then. (Note: "The Master Plan III, titled 'Humane Detention and Internment', was approved in November 2016 and aims to renovate 'to recover the lost capabilities in the existing institutions' and build additional cells and prisons as part of public-private partnerships.")

The prison was built as a public–private partnership between the Belgian Federal Public Service Justice (FPS Justice) and Calfasso N.V. (a Belgian-Spanish-Australian consortium). The Belgian Directorate of Buildings acted as client for the design and construction phase of the project. "Cafasso NV is composed of three shareholders: Macquarie Corporate Holdings PTY Limited, FCC Construcción S.A. and DENYS N.V." Denys NV is the main partner in the consortium, and is responsible for the €382 million construction cost, (Note: "Bouwkost: 382 miljoen euro inclusief btw (inbegrepen in de jaarlijkse vergoedingen vanaf de terbeschikkingstelling)" [Construction cost: 382 million euros including VAT (included in the annual fees from the moment of availability)]) the construction risk, and financing of the project. The buildings were designed by EGM architects, who collaborated with B2Ai on the prison village layout. Baljon Landscape Architects designed the outdoor space. "Macquarie Capital acted as sole financial adviser and majority sponsor on this project leading two debt financing competitions over a five-year period. The final structure involved eight lenders who provided a combination of construction equity bridge loans and long-term loan facilities." The state will pay an annual fee of €40.2 million for 25 years from the opening of the prison until 2047. The consortium will be responsible for the maintenance of the prison during the 25-year period. At the end of the 25-year period, the state will take over the prison.

Preparation for the project began in 2012. The initial planning application was submitted in 2013. Local residents and activists opposed the construction of the prison, and said that they wanted a park on the site instead of a large prison. Appeals were lodged against both the planning permission and the environmental permit issued by the Brussels Region. Objectors said that the project would generate an ecological problem; they objected to its large size; they said that its distance from the centre of the Brussels would increase in the isolation of prisoners from their families and loved ones; they said that it would cause very many journeys by inmates, relatives and justice professionals; they said that it was extremely expensive and therefore risked putting a greater strain on the justice budget. The Council of State rejected both appeals in June 2019.

Haren Prison was partly built on the old Wanson factory site, and partly on a nature reserve. The Wanson factory site was purchased for €53 million. Demolition and cleanup of this site took from February to September 2015, and cost almost €750,000.

Construction work began in Autumn 2018. The construction phase of the project was only 36 months. So several large construction companies worked together, and prefabricated concrete played an important role in the construction. Almost the entire Belgian prefab sector participated. (Note: Een unieke werf waar bijna de hele Belgische prefab sector aan meewerkt.) The project used a mixture of cast-in-place concrete (i.e. poured on site), and precast concrete. Gilles Geenen explained: "In addition to the foundations, the cellars and corridors that connect the various buildings underground were poured on site because they must be watertight. In addition, a number of the ground floors were poured on site. That was for logistical reasons." Precast concrete was used for some of the ground storey work, and for upper storeys.

Everything was designed in building information modeling (BIM) software, which produced a 3D model. The suppliers used BIM to draw their parts, which were then checked against the overall design model to prevent unexpected errors when the parts were put together on the site. The 3D model meant that spaces for pipes and electric cables were provided in the prefab moulds; this meant that they did not need to be ground into the concrete, which is what normally happens. Site management used the 3D model to determine the optimum placement order of parts. As of December 2020, there were 500 people and 15 tower cranes working on the site, and on some days 100 loads of construction materials arrived, which made the managing the project a challenge. Building work was completed in September 2022, and the Minister of Justice, Vincent Van Quickenborne, opened the prison on 30 September 2022.

Originally, it was planned to start moving inmates into Haren Prison in mid-October 2022, but this had to be postponed. At the time, three quarters of the doors lacked properly-working locks. Lack of staff was also a problem.

The first inmates to be transferred to Haren Prison were female prisoners from Berkendael Prison in the week ending 11 November 2022. Forest Prison closed on 18 November 2022; the transfer of the 126 inmates to Haren Prison took several days; most of Forest Prison's staff were also transferred to Haren. By 30 December 2022, 188 men and 76 women prisoners had been transferred to Haren Prison. By 6 January 2023, over a hundred prisoners and some staff from Saint-Gilles Prison had been transferred to Haren Prison (though this created staff shortages at Saint-Gilles). A male inmate from Forest was interviewed by the press before his transfer to Haren and said: "In Forest, yes, it is unsanitary, but we have our bearings. We know that the management is behind us. The director is human. The prisoner can express himself and explain himself". "In Haren, we will be in an American-style prison, we will no longer have any contact with the guards". Of Haren, he said that "this prison is very isolated". Marie Berquin, of the Belgian Section of Observatoire international des prisons, agreed with the inmate about Haren Prison's remoteness from the centre of Brussels: "Yes, there is a bus, but it will be less easy than going to the prison of Saint-Gilles or Forest. The prisoners fear that their family will come less often." The view of prison staff is that Haren Prison was opened prematurely; Stijn Van den Abeele (of the VSOA Prisons union) said: "Haren was opened too early, it's no secret. It is suffering from early teething problems [maladies de jeunesse]. Beveren Prison was tested for almost two years without inmates. All movements and activities there had been reviewed. This is not the case in Haren." Haren Prison is not yet fully staffed. In November 2022, FPS Justice started the process of recruiting 121 new prison officers [accompagnateurs de détention] and 52 security guards [assistants de sécurité]; candidates must either have Belgian nationality or that of a country in the Schengen Area, and must speak either perfect French or Dutch.

Though 37,000 square metres (9.1 acres) of greenery and 652 trees have been planted on the site, as of December 2022 the prison is still a construction site.

Works of art will be on display inside and outside the prison. A permanent exhibition will be open to the general public from April 2023. It is intended that the art collection will expand over the next three years.

Even though Haren Prison was intended to replace Berkendael Prison, Berkendael Prison will not be closed; it is being converted into a detention centre for about 60 short-term prisoners (imprisonment less than three years).

== Awards ==
- In June 2019, the project was voted "Best Social Infrastructure Project" at the 2019 Partnership Awards.
- In December 2019, the project won a WAFX Award in the "Power and Justice" category at the World Architecture Festival in Amsterdam.

== Notable inmates and former inmates ==
- Eva Kaili, Greek MEP and former Vice President of the European Parliament, who is being held there on remand, and was transferred from Saint-Gilles Prison to Haren Prison on 13 December 2022.
- Salah Abdeslam, a terrorist who participated in the Bataclan theatre attack in Paris in November 2015.

== See also ==
- Halden Prison, a large modern prison in Norway that opened in 2010
