= Marc Tarabella =

Belgian politician

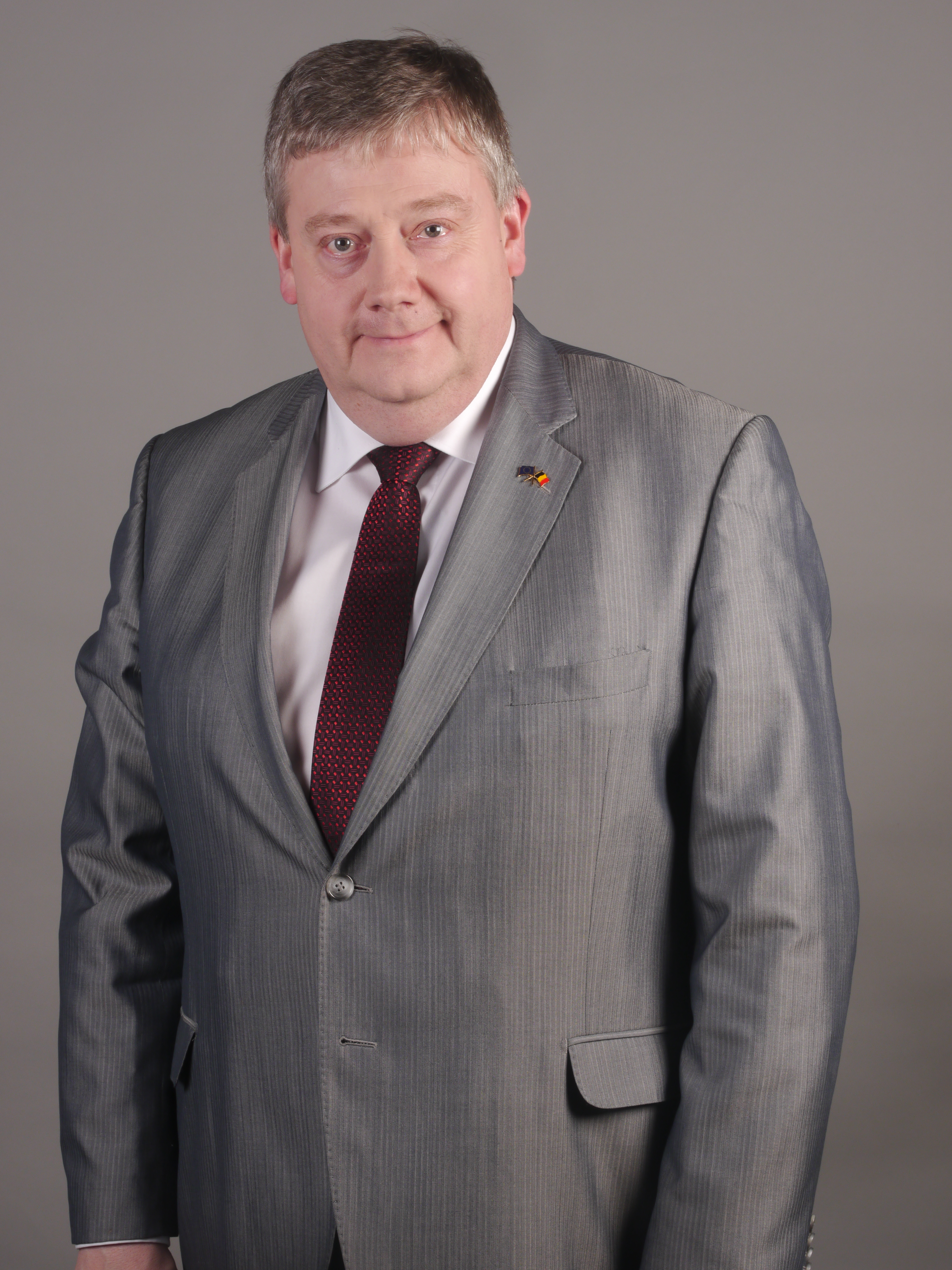
- Born: 11 March 1963 (age 63); Ougrée, Belgium
- Occupation: politician

Marc Tarabella (born 11 March 1963) is a Belgian politician who served as a Member of the European Parliament for the French Community of Belgium from 2004 to 2007 and from 2009 to 2024. He was a member of the Parti Socialiste, part of the Socialist Group. In February 2023 he was charged with corruption and money laundering in connection with the Qatar corruption scandal at the European Parliament.

== Early life ==
Tarabella was born in Ougrée, a suburb of Seraing from a family originally from Versilia, Italy.

== Education ==
- 1986: Degree in sociology, University of Liège
- 1988: Seconded to the office of the Premier of the Walloon Region
- 1990: Customer adviser, General Savings and Retirement Fund

== Political career ==
=== Career in national politics ===
- 1988–1994: Member of the Anthisnes Municipal Council
- since 1994: Mayor of Anthisnes
- 2000: Member of the executive of the Huy-Waremme Federation of the Socialist Party
- 2003: President of the Rural Foundation of Wallonia
- 2002: Belgian coordinator of the committees supporting Ingrid Betancourt

=== Member of the European Parliament ===
In parliament, Tarabella sat on the European Parliament's Committee on Agriculture and Rural Development. He was a substitute for the Committee on Employment and Social Affairs and a vice-chair of the Delegation for relations with the countries of Southeast Asia and the Association of Southeast Asian Nations (ASEAN).

In January 2021, Tarabella became a member of the Italian left-wing party Article One.

Amid the Qatar corruption scandal at the European Parliament in December 2022, Belgian police searched Tarabella's home. He subsequently suspended himself from the S&D group, and his Walloon Socialist party revoked his membership. He also stepped down as member and vice chair of the European Parliament’s delegation to Qatar and other Arabian Peninsula countries.

In February 2023 the European Parliament voted to waive immunity for Tarabella. He was subsequently arrested, charged with corruption and money laundering and remanded into custody. He denied any wrongdoing. In April 2023 he was released from prison and the following month released from house arrest. He returned to parliament, but did not stand for re-election in 2024. In October 2024, he was re-elected as mayor of Anthisnes.

== See also ==
- 2004 European Parliament election in Belgium
