= Antonio Panzeri =

Italian politician

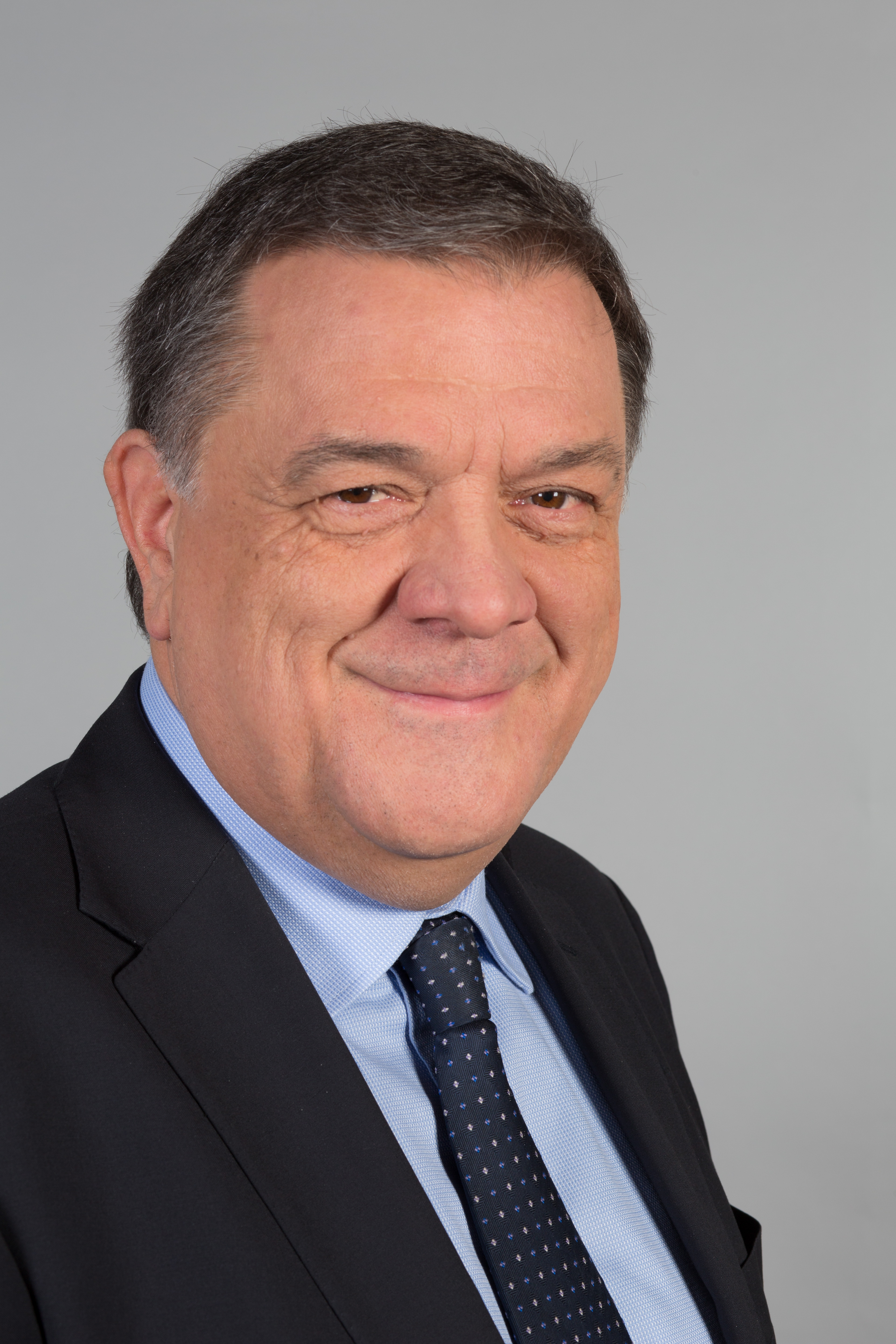
- Panzeri in 2016

Member of the European Parliament for North-West Italy
- In office 20 July 2004 – 1 July 2019

Personal details
- Born: Pier Antonio Panzeri; 6 June 1955 (age 70) Riviera d'Adda, Italy
- Party: PCI (until 1991); PDS (1991–1998); DS (1998–2007); PD (2007–2017); Art.1 (2017–2022); Independent (since 2022)
- Other political affiliations: Progressive Alliance of Socialists and Democrats
- Spouse: Maria Dolores Colleoni
- Children: 1
- Pier Antonio Panzeri's voice Recorded July 2019

Pier Antonio Panzeri (born 6 June 1955) is an Italian politician who served as a Member of the European Parliament from 2004 until 2019. In December 2022, in connection with the Qatar corruption scandal at the European Parliament, Panzeri was arrested and charged with corruption, money laundering and directing a criminal organisation. The following month, he entered into a plea bargain, in which he admitted his guilt and revealed information about the alleged criminal network in return for a lighter sentence.

== Career ==
Panzeri was born in Riviera d'Adda, province of Bergamo. Between 1995 and 2003, he was General Secretary of the Milan Chamber of Labour.

=== Member of the European Parliament, 2004–2019 ===
Panzeri became a Member of the European Parliament in the 2004 elections when he represented the Democrats of the Left in the North-West constituency. He later represented the Democratic Party and Article One. During his three terms in the European Parliament, he was a member of the Socialist Group in the European Parliament (2004–2009) and the Progressive Alliance of Socialists and Democrats group (2009–2019).

From 2009 until 2019, Panzeri served on the Committee on Foreign Affairs (AFET). In 2014, he also joined its Subcommittee on Human Rights (DROI). In this capacity, he was also a member of the Democracy Support and Election Coordination Group (DEG), which oversees the Parliament's election observation missions.

In addition to his committee assignments, Panzeri served as chairman of the parliament's delegation for relations with the Maghreb countries and the Arab Maghreb Union. He was previously a member of the delegations to the Parliamentary Assembly of the Mediterranean (2009–2014) and for relations with the United States (2004–2009). He was a member of the European Parliament Intergroup on Integrity (Transparency, Anti-Corruption and Organized Crime) and of the European Parliament Intergroup on LGBT Rights. He was also part of the Elie Wiesel Network of Parliamentarians for the Prevention of Genocide and Mass Atrocities and against Genocide Denial.

=== Founder of Fight Impunity ===
In September 2019, Panzeri founded a human rights NGO in Brussels, Fight Impunity. The organisation had a number of well-respected board members and honorary board members, who resigned after Panzeri's arrest and were not implicated in criminal activity. The organisation's mission statement was:

The aim of Fight Impunity is built on the necessity to promote the fight against impunity for serious violations of human rights and crimes against humanity having the principle of accountability as a central pillar of the architecture of international justice.

Fight Impunity failed to file accounts or register with EU's Transparency Register.

== December 2022 arrest ==
Panzeri came under suspicion in 2021 when the Belgian secret service began a corruption probe that would later become known as Qatargate. The investigation initially centred around the European Parliament's relations with Morocco, in particular those concerning fishing rights and the disputed territory of Western Sahara. During his term as an MEP, Panzeri had co-chaired an EU-Morocco joint parliamentary committee with Abderrahim Atmoun, Morocco's ambassador to Poland, and his voting record showed support for Morocco's interests. In 2014, King Mohammed VI awarded Panzeri and Atmoun with the third class "wissam" medal for their services to Morocco. In July 2022, the Belgian secret services installed surveillance equipment in Penzeri's house after discovering €700,000 in cash at the property. The police and prosecutor's office became involved in the investigation, which had widened to include Qatar.

Panzeri was arrested on the morning of 9 December 2022 as Belgian police conducted a series of raids in Brussels. A search uncovered €600,000 cash in his house. He was charged with corruption, money laundering and directing a criminal organisation and detained in Saint-Gilles Prison in Brussels. Also arrested on 9 December on similar charges were: Panzeri's former parliamentary assistant and co-founder of Fight Impunity, Francesco Giorgi; Giorgi's partner, MEP Eva Kaili; and Niccolo Figa-Talamanca, head of No Peace Without Justice, an NGO that shared office space with Fight Impunity.

Panzeri initially denied that he had been involved in corruption, saying that he had simply been paid for lobbying and had not declared the cash as Qatar wanted it kept quiet. But on 17 January 2023 he agreed a plea bargain with prosecutors, in which, in return for a lighter sentence, he admitted his guilt and agreed to disclose information about how the network operated and who was involved. Following the plea deal, the Belgian authorities withdrew their extradition request for Panzeri's wife and daughter, who had been arrested in Italy on suspicion of complicity in the affair. Panzeri revealed to the authorities that he had received money from Mauritania, as well as Morocco and Qatar.

After four months in prison, Panzeri was moved to house arrest with an electronic tag. In September 2023, his request to have the electronic tag removed and be released from house arrest was granted, on condition he did not contact any of the other suspects.

== Other activities ==
- European Endowment for Democracy (EED), Member of the Board of Governors (2014–2019)

== Publications ==
- Il lavoratore fuori garanzia
- La democrazia economica
