= Vilvoorde Viaduct =

Bridge in Belgium

Coordinates: 50°54′48″N 4°25′17″E

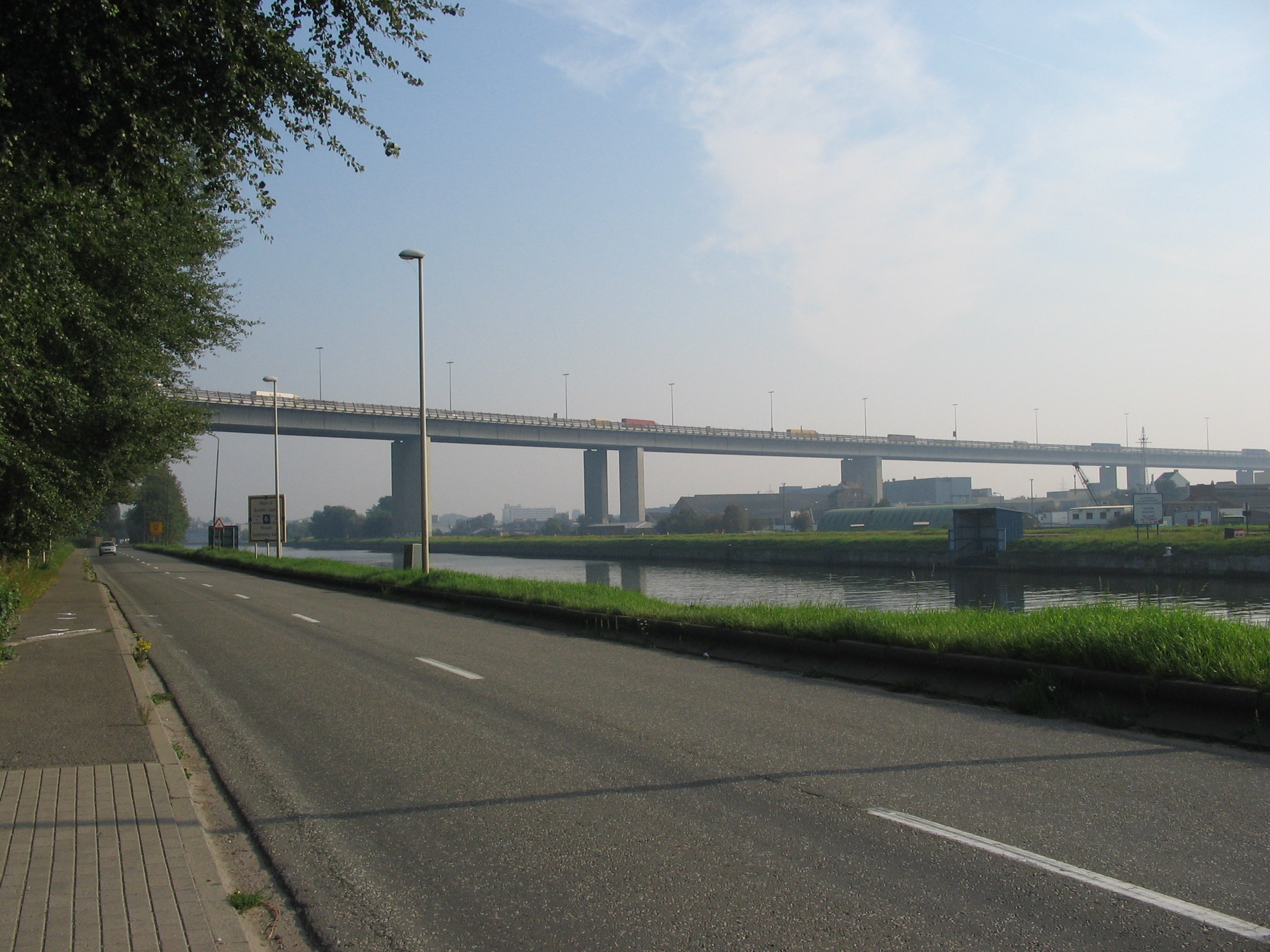
Vilvoorde Viaduct

The viaduct partially covered in scaffolding, 2026

The Vilvoorde viaduct is part of the R0 Brussels beltway.

Built as the last piece to close the Brussels beltway in 1977, it allowed the beltway to be opened for traffic on December 29 the same year. It crosses several roads, the river Zenne, the Brussels–Scheldt Maritime Canal, a railroad and the former Renault assembly plant.

Eight years of renovations began in 2023. Today's daily traffic is about 140.000 vehicles, while the saturation point is about 180.000. It has seen record-breaking traffic jams, mostly caused by roadworks.

== Technical data ==
- Length : 1700 m
- Height : 35 m (average)
- Width : 20 m for each direction
- 22 rows of pillars
- Largest span: 162 m
- Superstructure : start and ending in concrete - centre structure in steel (879 m)
