= Dominique Cottrez =

French serial killer

- Born: Dominique Cottrez; Villers-au-Tertre, Nord Department, France
- Convictions: Murder, Infanticide
- Penalty: 9 years imprisonment

Details
- Victims: 8
- Span of crimes: 1989–2006
- Country: France
- Date apprehended: July 2010

Dominique Cottrez is a French woman who admitted to killing 8 of her newborn infants.

== Murders ==
Cottrez committed the murders during an approximately 17-year period between 1989 and 2006. She suffocated eight of her children shortly after giving birth. Cottrez was able to conceal her pregnancies from her husband and doctor due to her weight. She buried the bodies in gardens at her home and her parents' home.

In July 2010, two of the bodies were discovered in plastic bags by new owners working in the garden of a house Dominique and her husband, Pierre-Marie Cottrez, previously occupied. When police contacted the Cottrez family to question them about the discoveries, Dominique immediately admitted that the bodies belonged to two infants she had given birth to. She also told police that six more infants' bodies were hidden in the garage.

== Trial ==
French prosecutors announced on 29 July 2010 that Dominique had been indicted on murder charges. Her husband was questioned by a judge but has not been charged at this time. Prosecutors believe he may have been unaware of the infants because Dominique's obesity concealed the pregnancies.

In August 2012, Dominique was released by an appeals court in the town of Douai on the condition that she continue to receive psychological and psychiatric care.

On 2 July 2015, Dominique was found guilty and sentenced to nine years in prison on eight counts of infanticide.

Dominique and Pierre-Marie Cottrez are also the parents of two adult daughters.

== See also ==
- Infanticide
- Véronique Courjault
- Celine Lesage
- List of French serial killers
