= Maria Spyraki =

Greek journalist and politician

Maria Spyraki MEP
- Μαρία Σπυράκη
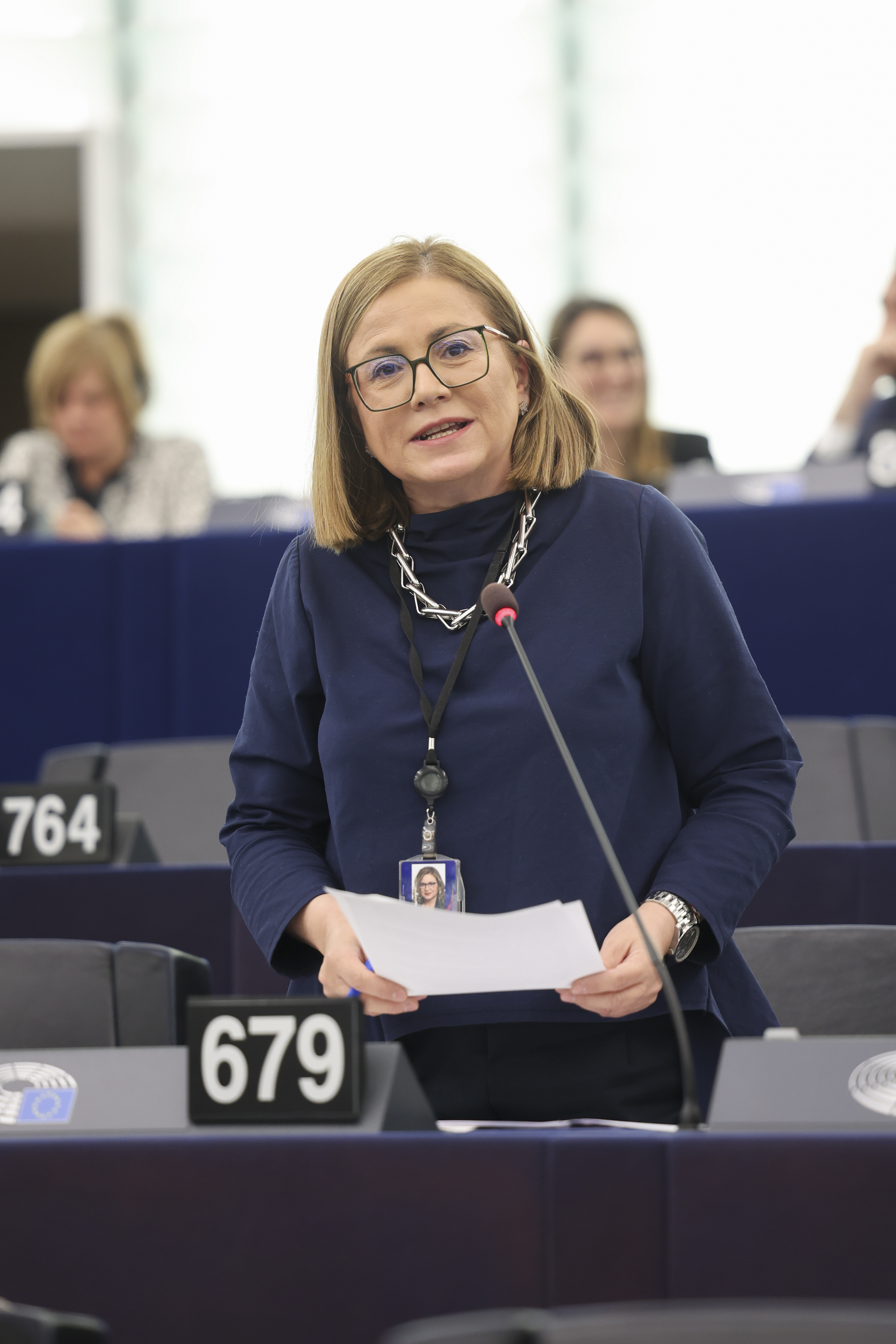

Member of the European Parliament for Greece
- In office 1 July 2014 – 16 July 2024

Spokesperson of New Democracy
- In office 31 December 2014 – 26 January 2015
- Preceded by: Anna Asimakopoulou
- Succeeded by: Kostas Karagounis

Personal details
- Born: 11 September 1965 (age 61) Larissa, Greece
- Party: Nea Dimokratia
- Education: University of Thessaloniki, London School of Journalism
- Profession: Journalist, politician
- Website: https://www.mariaspyraki.eu/

Maria Spyraki (Greek: Μαρία Σπυράκη; born 11 September 1965) is a Greek journalist, politician, and a member of the European Parliament (MEP) for New Democracy.

== Early life ==
Maria Spyraki was born in Larissa in 1965. She studied chemistry at the Aristotle University of Thessaloniki and then at the London School of Journalism.

== Political career ==
In the 2014 European Parliament election, Spyraki was elected one of five MEPs on the Nea Dimokratia list; she was elected first in order with 248.350 votes. She affiliates with the parliamentary group of the European People's Party (EPP) and is member of the Committee on Regional Development and member of the Delegation to the EU-Former Yugoslav Republic of Macedonia Joint Parliamentary Committee.

On 31 December 2014, ahead of the Greek legislative election, Spyraki was shortly appointed Nea Dimokratia's spokesperson. After the elections she was however replaced by Kostas Karagounis in order to return to her duties at the European Parliament.

In addition to her committee assignments, Spyraki is part of the European Parliament Intergroup on Seas, Rivers, Islands and Coastal Areas and the MEPs Against Cancer group.
