= Mass media use by the Islamic State =

Jihadist propaganda on social media

The Islamic State (IS) is known for its extensive and effective use of propaganda. It uses a version of the Muslim Black Standard flag and developed an emblem which has clear symbolic meaning in the Muslim world.

Videos by the Islamic State are commonly accompanied by nasheeds (chants), notable examples being the chant Dawlat al-Islam Qamat, which came to be viewed as an unofficial anthem of the Islamic State, and Salil al-Sawarim.

== Traditional media ==
=== Al-Furqan Foundation for Media Production ===
In January 2006, shortly after the group's rebranding as the "Islamic State of Iraq", it established the Al-Furqan Foundation for Media Production (Arabic: مؤسسة الفرقان للإنتاج الإعلامي, romanized: Muasasat al-Furqān lil'īntāj al'ilāmī), which produces CDs, DVDs, posters, pamphlets, and web-related propaganda products and official statements. It is the primary media production house of the Islamic State and responsible for production of major media releases, including the statements of the spokesmen and leaders of the group.

On January 10, 2006, Al-Furqan released its very first video, titled (Arabic: زحف الأنوار, romanized: Zahf al-Anwār)

It was founded by the Iraqi man Dr Wa'il al-Fayad, known as Abu Muhammad al-Furqan. He got his name "Al-Furqan" from his role in founding this media house, which was named after the 25th surah of the Quran Al-Furqan. It is the oldest media production house for the Islamic State, being founded in November 2006 to release media for the Islamic State of Iraq. The earliest release indexed by the SITE Intelligence Group is on 21 November 2006, documenting the storming of a police station in the Iraqi town of Miqdadiyah.

Al-Furqan is considered to be a considerable innovation in jihadist media, with Kavkaz Center describing it as "a milestone on the path of jihad, a distinguished media that takes the great care in the management of the conflict with the crusaders and their tails and to expose the lies in the crusader's media."

In October 2007, the Long War Journal reported on United States Army raids targeting Al-Furqan media cell members across Iraq, including in Mosul and Samarra. Between August 2013 and March 2014 they released the 22 part series Messages from the Land of Epic Battles. On 2 September 2014 SITE Intelligence Group discovered the beheading video called A Second Message to America, about the death of Steven Sotloff.

Since then, Al-Furqan has released videos of their operations across Iraq and Syria, as well as execution videos directed to governments around the world. It also produces media in the form of audio, which consists mostly of recordings of IS leaders and spokesmen giving speeches, as well as producing a single nasheed under their name called "Ya Allah Al-Jannah" (O Allah, (we ask you for) Paradise), sung by now-dead member of IS, Uqab Al-Marzuqi. In April 2019, Al-Furqan released a video interviewing ISIS leader Abu Bakr al-Baghdadi.

=== Al-I'tisam Foundation for Media Production ===
Al-I'tisam Foundation for Media Production logo

The Islamic State of Iraq founded a second media foundation - Al-I'tisam Media Foundation - around 2011, marked by their first video release, titled "The Conqueror of the Murtaddin: Abu Ahmad Al-Ansari". The foundation has since released a few series of videos, 50 parts of "Windows on the Land of Battles", 9 parts of "Pictures from the Land of Battles", a 9-part series quoting leaders about the establishment of the Islamic State, and other series before their last release, "Deterring the Safavids in Salah ad-Din" in 2015.

Since then, there were no further releases from their behalf.

=== Al-Hayat Media Center ===
Logo of the "Inside the Caliphate/Khilafah" series produced by Al-Hayat Media Center

In mid-2014, IS established the Al-Hayat Media Center, which targets Western audiences and produces material in English, German, Russian, Urdu, Indonesian, Turkish, Bengali, Chinese, Bosnian, Kurdish, Uyghur, and French. When IS announced its expansion to other countries in November 2014 it established media departments for the new branches, and its media apparatus ensured that the new branches follow the same models it uses in Iraq and Syria. Then FBI Director James Comey said that IS's "propaganda is unusually slick," noting that, "They are broadcasting... in something like 23 languages".

In July 2014, Al-Hayat began publishing a digital magazine called Dabiq, in a number of different languages including English. According to the magazine, its name is taken from the town of Dabiq in northern Syria, which is mentioned in a hadith about Armageddon. Al-Hayat also began publishing other digital magazines, including the Turkish language Konstantiniyye, the Ottoman word for Istanbul, the French language Dar al-Islam, and the Russian language Istok (Russian: Исток). By late 2016, these magazines had apparently all been discontinued, with Al-Hayat's material being consolidated into a new magazine called Rumiyah (Arabic for Rome).

=== Al-Naba ===
While the group's glossy, foreign-language magazines like Dabiq and Rumiyah ceased publication as the group lost territory, the weekly Arabic newsletter Al-Naba (The News) has continued to publish regularly, becoming the central pillar of the group's "media jihad" in the post-territorial phase. Recent scholarship, including studies published in 2025, suggests that Al-Naba serves a dual purpose: maintaining internal cohesion among dispersed fighters and projecting a narrative of endurance to enemies. Unlike the earlier magazines which were designed for recruitment, Al-Naba focuses on bureaucratic reporting, military statistics, and religious instruction. These are then translated and disseminated by decentralized supporter networks ("media mujahideen") to reach non-Arabic speakers.

=== Furat Media Center ===
Furat Media Center logo

The Al-Furat Media Center is another media center established in around 2015 to cater towards non-Arab speaking audiences. However, unlike the other organizations, the production wasn't as professional as ones made by the other media centers. Instead, they partially relied on local media departments and foreign communities of the Mujahideen to produce short-form videos. However, some professional long-form videos were also made under their behalf.

As of now, the media center is the only known active branch of all the media centers of the Islamic State, after heavy losses from past campaigns against them. Their last release was "The Resolve of Muwahhidin in Russia", where videos from the Surovikino penal colony hostage crisis were edited and released.

=== Ajnad Foundation for Media Production ===
Ajnad Foundation logo Jan. 2014-Present

Ajnad Foundation is one of the official media wings of Islamic State which produces nasheeds and Quran recitations. It was established in January 2014 and has released more than 150 nasheeds.

=== Asdaa Foundation ===
Like the Ajnad Foundation, the Asdaa Foundation (Arabic: مؤسسة أصداء) or Asedaa Foundation produces Anasheed (Islamic chants).

The foundation is the closest counterpart to Ajnad in producing Islamic State nasheeds, only difference being Ajnad is directly linked to the Islamic State while Asdaa is only classified as a "supporter organization" (munaser/munasera).

The foundation had humble beginnings possibly in Yemen, where low-quality nasheeds were produced at first by 2 munshids, Abu Layth Al-Iraqi and Abu Ya'qub Al-Yamani. After that, the quality had improved a bit (possibly with new equipment and increased recognition) and eventually had its nasheeds included in the Islamic State's official media releases.

One of its munshids, Abu Hafs is a renowned munshid who sings around 70 nasheeds, who as well works with Ajnad Foundation in some instances. He is currently alive, and working under Ansar Production Center (مركز إنتاج الأنصار), another Munasir foundation and Asedaa.

Some of their anasheed is used in IS's execution videos, a popular one is their human slaughterhouse execution video released during the time of Eid Al-Adha in 2016. The background nasheed they used was "We Came To Fill The Horizons With Terror", produced by the Asdaa Foundation.

As of now, Asdaa' Foundation currently has 3 confirmed munshids, Abu Hafs, Abu Bakr and Abu Nouf and Abu Mu'awiyah are currently theorized to be running inside France and Kuwait and also Syria. Abu Nouf, also known as Abu Nawaf, has collaborated with Abu Hafs on multiple occasions through the Asedaa Foundation and the Ansar Production Center. He has also been known to produce nasheeds within the munasir circles of the Islamic State. His work has extended to several other media foundations, including the Sunni Shield Foundation (مؤسسة الدرع السني), the Khattab Foundation (مؤسسة خطاب) and As-Shura Foundation. Abu Nouf, is the only active of these munshids, continuing to release media for al-Battar and the Ansar Production Center, with his latest release being on July 2, 2026.

=== Networks ===
Logo of Al-Bayan

The group also runs a radio network called Al-Bayan, which airs bulletins in Arabic, Russian and English and provides coverage of its activities in Iraq, Syria and Libya.

The IS also has an official library - Maktabah Al-Himmah - which releases books, posters, pamphlets, and apps to further spread their ideology. Huroof is one of the 3 apps created by Maktabah Al-Himmah in order to teach kids Arabic, the Qur'an, prayers and to recruit young children into becoming Islamic State soldiers.

=== Fursan al-Tarjuma ===
Fursan al-Tarjuma, translated as Knights of Translation, is an ISIS umbrella organization of 14 pro-IS media outlets that publish IS content as propaganda.

=== Hadm al-Aswar ===
Hadm al-Aswar is an ISIS media outlet, which turned highlights from al-Naba newspaper into brief videos.

== Social media ==
IS's use of social media has been described by one expert as "probably more sophisticated than [that of] most US companies". It regularly uses social media, particularly Twitter, to distribute its messages. The group uses the encrypted instant messaging service Telegram to disseminate images, videos and updates.

The group is known for releasing videos and photographs of executions of prisoners, whether beheadings, bombings, shootings, caged POWs being burnt alive or submerged gradually until drowned. Journalist Abdel Bari Atwan described IS's media content as part of a "systematically applied policy". The escalating violence of its killings "guarantees" the attention of the media and public.

Alongside images of brutality, IS presents itself as "an emotionally attractive place where people 'belong', where everyone is a 'brother' or 'sister'". The "most potent psychological pitch" of IS media is the promise of heavenly reward to dead jihadist fighters. Frequently posted in their media are dead jihadists' smiling faces, the Muslim 'salute' of a 'right-hand index finger pointing heavenward' (pointing towards where Allah is), and testimonies of happy widows. IS has also attempted to present a more "rational argument" in a series of videos hosted by the kidnapped journalist John Cantlie. In one video, various current and former US officials were quoted, such as then-US President Barack Obama and former CIA officer Michael Scheuer.

IS has also encouraged sympathisers to initiate vehicle-ramming and stabbing attacks worldwide.
