= Ar-Raud =

Media archive of all publications of the Islamic State

- أرشيف إعلام الرعود
- Predecessor: Al-Elokab Media
- Successor: Al-Fustat Media
- Formation: 2021
- Dissolved: July 2024
- Legal status: Media organization
- Official language: Arabic
- Affiliations: Islamic State

Ar-Raud (Arabic: الرعود, romanized: ar-raʕd, lit. 'the Thunder') also known as ar-Raud Media Archive (Arabic: أرشيف إعلام الرعود, romanized: ʔaršīf ʔiʕlām ar-raʕd) was a media archive of all publications (videos, news reports, magazines, etc.) of the Islamic State.

== History ==
Ar-Raud Media Archive was established in 2021 succeeding the Al-Elokab website with association of the Islamic State to disseminate Islamic State propaganda. The website hosted videos made by Al-Hayat Media Center, Al-Furat Media Center, Al-I‘tisam Media Foundation, and Al-Furqan Media Center, including nasheeds and Quran reciting from Ajnad Media Foundation and nasheeds Asdaa Foundation. It also included a section of content made by supporter media organizations of the Islamic State such as Al-Adiyat, Al-Battar, At-Taqwa, and Caliphate Castle media, including an archive of all Al-Bayan Radio recordings in English and Arabic. It posted the weekly Al-Naba magazine with translations from Halummu and reports from Amaq News Agency which included both photo and video coverage of incidents.

Around June of 2024, the Ar-Raud website experienced an outage which deemed the site unusable and the only text displayed on the site said "The general site is not available now and will be back soon, Inshallah. You can follow us on our site on Twitter." (الموقع العام غير متاح الآن وسيعود قريبا إن شاء الله .. يمكنكم متابعتنا على موقعنا على التور), with Islamic State support media warning against using the site at the time of outage, citing security concerns. By July 2024, the site was taken down permanently alongside the I'lam Foundation after several takedown attempts. The takedown was considered a large impact against the Islamic States' internet presence.

The website was funded through cryptocurrency donations including Monero and Ethereum.
