= Ahmad Abousamra =

Person on the FBI Most Wanted Terrorists list

- Abousamra in 2004
- Born: September 19, 1981; France
- Died: January 2017 (aged 35); Near Al-Thawrah, Syria
- Other names: Abu Fadl, Ahmad Abou, Ahmad Samra
- Education: University of Massachusetts Boston, Xaverian Brothers Catholic High School, Stoughton High School
- Organization(s): Al-Nusra Front (2013); Islamic State (2013–2017)
- Known for: FBI Most Wanted Terrorist

Ahmad Abousamra (Note: Other transliterations include Ahmad Abou-Samra, Ahmad Abou Samira, Ahmad Abu Samra and Ahmad Abou Samra) (Arabic: أحمد أبو سمرة, romanized: ʾAḥmad Abū Samrah; 19 September 1981 – January 2017), known also as Abu Sulayman ash-Shami and Abu Maysarah ash-Shami, was a Syrian-American militant and ideologue who served as the chief editor of the Islamic State's Dabiq magazine. In 2013, he was placed on the US Federal Bureau of Investigation's 'most wanted list' and made the subject of a $50,000 reward because of his connections to a Massachusetts terrorism investigation centering on his alleged close associate Tarek Mehanna, who was arrested in 2009 and convicted of terrorism-related charges in a Boston court in late 2011. He was featured on the FBI's Most Wanted Terrorists list for allegedly attempting to obtain military training in his trips to Yemen and Pakistan for the purpose of killing American soldiers overseas.

== Biography ==
=== Early life and education ===
Ahmad Abousamra was a Syrian-American dual citizen who was born in France on 19 September 1981.

He grew up in the Boston suburb of Stoughton. He attended Xaverian Brothers Catholic High School in Westwood up until his senior year when he transferred to Stoughton High and graduated in 1999. In 2006, he graduated from the University of Massachusetts Boston with a degree in computer science.

=== Travel to Pakistan, Yemen and Iraq ===
In 2002, he traveled to Pakistan in an attempt to receive terrorist training and enter Afghanistan to fight American forces alongside the Taliban. His plan failed and he returned to the United States.

According to US officials, in 2003, Abousamra and Mehanna discussed the feasibility of killing a US executive branch official. Later in the year the trio discussed launching an attack on a US mall, inspired by the Washington sniper shootings. They backed out of the plan after failing to get hold of automatic weapons.

According to US court documents, in 2004 Abousamra and Mehanna went to Yemen to attend a terrorist training camp there. Abousamra then went to Fallujah in Iraq with the intention of fighting US troops there. After about two weeks in Iraq, Abousamra traveled to Jordan and Syria, returning to Boston in August 2004.

In 2006, he and Mehanna were questioned by the FBI's Joint Terrorism Task Force, but they provided false information. Shortly afterward he left the country to Syria, never to return.

=== Indictment ===
He was indicted for his arrest on November 5, 2009. Abousamra was wanted by the FBI for conspiracy to provide material support to terrorists, providing and attempting to provide material support to terrorists in connection with al-Qaeda, conspiracy to kill in a foreign country, conspiracy, and false statements. Authorities offered US$50,000 reward for tips leading to his arrest, saying he was living in Aleppo, Syria with his wife and one child.

=== Islamic State ===
In 2013, Abousamra joined Jabhat al-Nusra in Syria, which was at the time a front group for the Islamic State of Iraq. When the leadership within Jabhat al-Nusra attempted to break away from ISI after Abu Bakr al-Baghdadi created the Islamic State of Iraq and the Levant, he remained loyal to the Islamic State. According to a eulogy by IS, shortly after the split he requested to carry out a suicide attack but was spotted by Abu Muhammad al-Furqan, who brought him into the groups media department. He was appointed as chief editor of Dabiq magazine which was created as part of a collaboration between him and Abu Muhammad al-Furqan.

According to IS, his "proficiency in Sharia knowledge" resulted in him being entrusted by al-Furqan "to draft his ideas into articles, which he did under the pen name "Abu Maysarah ash-Shami [...] and while many attempts were made to uncover his identity, all of them ended in failure." Writing under the name Abu Maysarah, he became famous for his fierce condemnation of al-Qaeda, which he dismissed as "Jews of Jihad" in a 2016 article.

He was also responsible for the creation of Rumiyah magazine which was to replace Dabiq as a monthly magazine. He also participated in a failed plot to kill the American Muslim scholar Hamza Yusuf.

== Death ==
On April 5, 2017, Islamic State announced in its eight edition of Rumiyah that Abousamra was killed in an airstrike near al-Thawrah, Syria in January 2017.

Despite this, the FBI's website still lists Abousamra as a fugitive.
