= Salil =

Salil may refer to:

- Salil Ankola (born 1968), former Indian cricketer
- Salil Chaturvedi, director of Indian apparel brand Provogue and a former sailing champion
- Salil Chowdhury (1922–1995), famous Hindi and Bengali composer, poet and a playwright
- Salil Oberoi (born 1983), English cricketer
- Salil Shetty, Indian United Nations official, next Secretary-General of Amnesty International
- Salil al-Sawarim, a nasheed by ISIS
- Salil Singh, a character in the book series “A Good Girl’s Guide to Murder”.
