= Fartaqi =

Studio album by Ahmed Bukhatir
- Released: 2003
- Genre: Nasheed
- Length: 28:19

Ahmed Bukhatir chronology
Al Quds Tunadeena (2001)	Fartaqi (2003)	Da'ani (2005)

Released in 2003, Fartaqi is the third album over all by Ahmed Bukhatir as well as the first solo studio album by Ahmed Bkuhatir though munshids Humood Al-Khudher and Muhammad Obaid are featured.

== Track listing ==
#	Title	Length
01	Fartaqi	3:20
02	Ya man Yara	5:00
03	Ya Eid (feat. Humood Al-Khudher and Muhammad Obaid)	4:30
04	Ketaab Allah	3:05
05	Al-Hejaab	3:00
06	Daan Al-Ghoroor	4:02
07	Taaleb Al-'Elm	3:15
08	Ya-Aa'Deeman	4:00
