= Huroof =

Islamic State Android application

- Original author: Islamic State
- Developer: Al-Himmah Library
- Release: 2016
- Operating system: Android
- Available in: Arabic
- Type: Learning game

Huroof (Arabic: حروف, lit. 'letters') is an Android application produced by the Islamic State, specifically the Al-Himmah Library. It is targeted towards children as an educational tool to learn the Arabic alphabet, with the purpose of recruiting them to support the Islamic State and its practices.

== Application ==
Huroof uses child-like visuals on the main menu, and contains multiple in-app games for learning the alphabet. Many of these reference jihadist concepts, including imagery of weapons (including missiles, tanks, cannons, and swords) and violent images, as well as Islamic State imagery such as the flag of the Islamic State and nasheeds from Ajnad Media Foundation.

Reportedly, Huroof was released via Telegram channels affiliated with the Islamic State, as well as other file sharing websites. Though not the first mobile app released by the Islamic State, Huroof is the first to target children.

=== In-App Games ===
In one of the games available in the Huroof app, the player listens to a radio displaying the Al-Bayan logo and learns the Arabic alphabet while a nasheed plays. In another, the player writes letters and numbers while a small child explains what they are. A third game shows the player images and asks them to choose which letter the image's subject starts with.
