= Al-Fatihin Magazine =

Indonesian language magazine

Al-Fatihin
- Issue 6 cover
- Categories: Islamic, news
- Publisher: Islamic State
- Founder: AlFurat Media Center
- Founded: 2016
- Final issue: 2017
- Language: Indonesian

Al-Fatihin (Arabic: الفاتحين, romanized: al-Fātiḥīn, lit. 'The Conquerors') was a magazine in the Indonesian language published by the Islamic State and released by Al-Furat Media Center.

== See also ==
- Dabiq (magazine)
- Rumiyah (magazine)
