= Hasanat =

Studio album by Ahmed Bukhatir
- Released: 2007
- Genre: Nasheed
- Length: 54:28
- Label: SUNDUS

Ahmed Bukhatir chronology
Da'ani (2005)	Hasanat (2007)	Moments with Allah (2010)

Hasanat is the sixth album released by Ahmed Bukhatir in 2007. It consists of ten nasheeds of which four are in English. Two video clips were released after this album: Ya'Bonayya (O My Son) and Atfalana (Our Children).

== Track listing ==
#	Title	Length
01.	Ya'Bonayya (O My Son)	6:07
02.	Sunna' Al Hayat (Establishers of Life)	5:36
03.	Don't Let Me Go	5:31
04.	Ayuhal Hadi (Oh the Guider)	4:41
05.	This is my Hijab	5:14
06.	Khair Al Khalq (Best of Creation)	6:59
07.	Allah Almighty	4:59
08.	Hasanat (Good Deeds)	5:17
09.	Atfalana (Our Children)	5:09
10.	I Still Ask	6:15

== Video clips ==
The video clip for Atfalana was released in 2008. It was shot in Salalah, Oman, during October 2008. The nasheed promotes brotherhood and unity with its cheerful words and Ahmed portrays a person who guides a group of children, encouraging them to be united. He follows them to prayers and guides the children against stealing and fighting. The video clip was directed by Ahmed Abdel Baset, who has worked with Ahmed Bukhatir three times in his career.

The video clip for Ya'Bonayya was released in 2007. Its director was Mohammed Al Ajami. The video clip portrayed Ahmed as a son who is happily living with his father but then decides to leave. After he leaves, they are both saddened by this separation.
