= Moments with Allah =

Studio album by Ahmed Bukhatir
- Released: 2010
- Genre: Nasheed
- Length: 44.08
- Label: SUNDUS

Ahmed Bukhatir chronology
Hasanat (2007)	Moments with Allah (2010)

Released in 2010, Moments with Allah is the seventh album released by Ahmed Bukhatir. It consists of ten nasheeds: six in Arabic, three in English and one, his first ever, in French. The album was sponsored by Du Telecom of UAE, of which Bukhatir is an ambassador.

== Track listing ==
Moments with Allah Track Listing

#	Title	Language
01.	La Illha il Allah ( There is no God but Allah)	AR
02.	Nihaya Ghorba	AR
03.	Remember Them	EN
04.	Yusuf	EN
05.	Pourquoi Les Hommes Pleurent	FR
06.	Hold These Days	EN
07.	Ouda Dura	AR
08.	Ya Illahi (O God)	AR
09.	Dunya Bashar	AR
10.	Moth Arafto Allah Rabi	AR
