= Ten Sports =

Pakistani sports channel

- Country: Pakistan
- Broadcast area: Asia; South Asia
- Headquarters: Karachi, Pakistan; Dubai, United Arab Emirates

Programming
- Languages: Urdu; English
- Picture format: 1080p (16:9, HDTV) MPEG 4

Ownership
- Owner: Tower Sports Private Limited
- Parent: Hum Network

History
- Launched: 1 April 2002; 24 years ago; SD; 5 July 2022; 4 years ago; HD
- Founder: Abdul Rahman Bukhatir

Links
- Website: tensportstv.com

Availability

Ten Sports is a Pakistani sports channel operated by the Hum Network. It mainly broadcasts Cricket, Football, Mixed martial arts, UFC, WWE, Tennis.

== History ==
On 1 April 2002, the Dubai-based Taj Television company launched the channel as Ten Sports in India and Pakistan.

In 2006, Essel Group bought the Ten Sports channel and made it a part of its Zee Entertainment Enterprises Limited. However, the Pakistani simulcast was handed over to a company called Tower Two, which was an Essel Group subsidiary.

In 2016, Ten Sports was bought by UK-based Japan's Sony subsidiary, Tower Sports Private Limited to operate Ten Sports in Pakistan.

The Pakistan Electronic Media Regulatory Authority documents reveal Tower Sports applied for the renewal of landing rights permission for the channel Ten Sports on 29 June 2018, as their permission was expiring later that year. In December 2018, the PEMRA awarded Landing Right Permission (LRD) to Tower Sports for "Ten Sports 2" channel in Pakistan. In 2019, Ten Sports launched its website. In February 2020, the PCB appointed Tower Sports to handle broadcast production for the 2020 Pakistan Super League, the first edition of the PSL to be played entirely in Pakistan.

On 5 July 2022, Ten Sports converted its transmission into high-definition.

In October 2022, Tower Sports Pvt Ltd (Ten Sports Pakistan) was acquired by Pakistan's leading media company, Hum Network for PKR 150 million as per company's filing in the Pakistan Stock Exchange.
