= Al-Fustat Media =

- Native name: الفُسطاط
- Website type: Propaganda
- Available in: Arabic
- Predecessor: ar-Raud
- Owner: Islamic State

Al-Fustat (Arabic: الفُسطاط, romanized: Alfusṭāṭ) or Al-Fustat Media (Arabic: مؤسسة الفسطاط الإعلامية, romanized: Muʼassasat al-Fusṭāṭ al-Iʻlāmīyah) is an online propaganda platform and successor to the Ar-Raud media archive associated with the Islamic State. The website is directly linked with the Islamic State.

== History ==
The website was launched on January 13, 2025, after the website of ar-Raud was shutdown, Al-Fustat launched with their propaganda outlet with a surface web domain and, in order to avoid takedowns with their surface web domain, they also launched an onion domain. The website hosted an archive of Islamic State propaganda as well as "security tips" relating to operational security for Islamic State supporters including the usage of virtual private networks, MAC address changers, and the Tor browser.

Supporter media posted on the platform has also targeted adolescents for recruitment.
