= Abu Yasser =

Islamic State nasheed singer

- Born: Iraq
- Other names: Abu Yasser al-Iraqi; Muhammad al-Rashed
- Occupation: Munshid
- Years active: 2011–2018
- Employer: Ajnad Foundation
- Organization(s): Al-Qaeda (until 2014); Islamic State (from 2013)
- Notable work: "Salil al-Sawarim" "Ummati Qad Laha Fajrun"

Abu Yasser (أبو ياسر, ʼAbū Yāsir) is the pseudonym of an Iraqi munshid for the Islamic State credited with several of their most popular nasheeds, including "Salil al-Sawarim" and "Ummati Qad Laha Fajrun". Despite his notoriety in the nasheed scene, little was known about his real identity.

== Biography ==
Abu Yasser had been singing in Jihadist circles associated with Al-Qaeda in Iraq since at least 2011, publishing his nasheeds through al-Malahem and Masami' al-Khayr. He joined the Islamic State around September 2013, at the height of the split between ISIS and Al-Qaeda. From 2013 to 2018, he was one of the main munshids of the Islamic State, working for the Ajnad Foundation. His last nasheed was "Hadhi al-Ukhuwwatu", a collaboration with Abu Muawiyah al-Najdi (another of the main singers of Ajnad) released in July 2018, although there was no information on him afterwards.

In 2024, it was revealed that over 40 known nasheeds were attributed to Abu Yasser, under the Al-Qaeda labels of Al-Ma'sadah Media Centre, As-Siddiq Media Centre, and Masami' Al-Khayr Media Centre, as well as the Ajnad Foundation of the Islamic State.

In late 2020, the Islamic State abandoned their earlier policy of concealing the identities of their media producers. Several names were made public, including Abu Yasser, who was credited with many of their most popular nasheeds. Some sources claimed that the real identity of Abu Yasser was Muhammad al-Rashed, who appeared to be Iraqi by birth and possibly a member of Al-Qaeda before joining the Islamic State, although beyond that, scant detail was known about his background, and nothing was publicly known about his education or training. He sang in different Arabic dialects. He was one of the most popular nasheed singers of the Islamic State, perhaps the best known, along with Maher Meshaal. He was also one of the pioneers of Jihadist nasheeds along with Abu Hajer al-Hadhrami.
