= Maher Meshaal =

Munshid and Islamic state member

- Born: 1989 al-Qassim Region, Saudi Arabia
- Died: 11 July 2015 (aged 25–26); Deir ez-Zor or near Al-Hasakah, Syria
- Occupation: Munshid
- Notable work: "Bāyaʿnāhu" "Salil al-Sawarim" "Halomoo Halomoo O' Lions of War"

Maher Meshaal Abdulaziz al-Shuaib (Arabic: ماهر مشعل عبد العزيز الشعيب, romanized: Māhir Mishʻal ʻAbd al-ʻAzīz ash-Shuʻayb), also known as Abu al-Zubayr al-Jazrawi and Abu al-Zubayr al-Qassimi, was a Saudi munshid. He became known for his television appearances and, in 2013, announced that he was travelling to Syria to join the Islamic State (IS). After joining the group, he appeared in videos and recordings associated with its propaganda.

== History ==
Maher Meshaal was born in al-Qassim Region, Saudi Arabia.

He was well known in his home country for appearing on a TV program for an anasheed competition before he emigrated to join the Islamic State (IS) in 2013. He also appeared on al-Bidayah TV Channel. He became famous as the singer behind some of their most famous and popular anasheed which are regularly played as background music in combat and execution videos released by Islamic State. Meshaal spent five years working as an munshid and an imam at a mosque in Riyadh, Saudi Arabia, before joining IS in April 2013, the Saudi Gazette claims.

Abdulaziz al-Arefi, the owner of Al-Bidayah, said that Meshaal had taken part in programmes and events and had travelled to several countries, including Bahrain, on youth trips. Al-Arefi also said that he had not noticed signs of extremism in Meshaal during his appearances on the channel. These statements reflect Al-Arefi's account of Meshaal and his time on the channel.

Before joining the Islamic State, he reportedly worked for about five years as a munshid and as an imam at a mosque in Riyadh.

Maher Meshaal on al-Bidayah TV

== Death ==
He was killed by a US airstrike around 11 July 2015 near the Syrian city of al-Hasakah. At the same time, US airstrikes on AQAP in Yemen also killed Abu Hajer al-Hadhrami.

On 9 January 2016, IS released a ten-minute documentary-style video titled "May they are alive with their Lord", a reference to Qur'an verse Ali 'Imran 3:169, celebrating Meshaal's life and exploits in his own words.

== See also ==
- Abu Hajer al-Hadhrami
- Abu Yasser
