= Abu Muhammad al-Furqan =

Iraqi ISIS senior leader

Dr Wa'il Adel Hasan Salman al-Fayad (died 7 September 2016), known as Abu Muhammad al-Furqan, was an Iraqi man and senior leader in the Islamic State, who served as the head of its central media department and was on the group's shura council.

== History ==
Little is known of his biographical details, but he was one of the few remaining first generation leaders of IS who were also members of the group's earliest incarnations. He is known to have led the media department for most of his time in the group. He was instrumental in setting up the group's now infamous media products such as Dabiq magazine and Amaq News Agency. He got his name "al-Furqan" from his founding of the al-Furqan Media Foundation, the central media which releases the group's most important releases, such as messages from its leaders.

== Death ==
He was killed on 7 September 2016 near Raqqah, Syria in an airstrike reported on September 16 by the US Pentagon. According to Pentagon press secretary Peter Cook, he was "one of the most senior leaders" of IS and "one of the very few leaders with direct access" to IS leader Abu Bakr al-Baghdadi. IS later confirmed his death.
