= Ahmed Bukhatir =

Emirati singer-songwriter

Ahmed Bukhatir أحمد بوخاطر
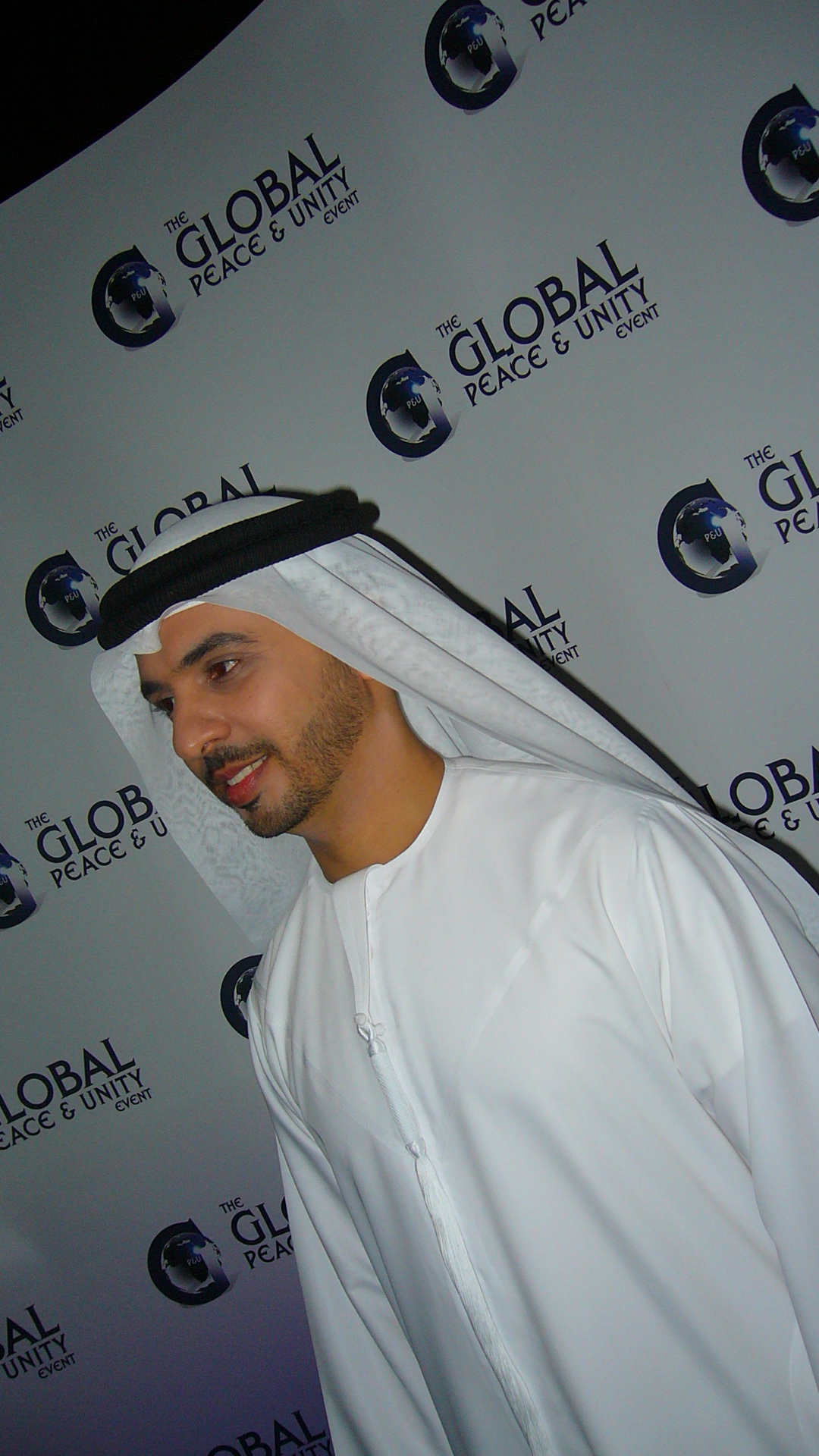
- Ahmed Bukhatir in Alqasba Algeria

Background information
- Born: 16 October 1975 (age 50)
- Origin: Sharjah, UAE
- Occupations: Nasheed Singer; businessperson; author; senator; actor
- Website: www.ahmedbukhatir.com

Ahmed Bukhatir (Arabic: أحمد بوخاطر; born 16 October 1975) is an Emirati singer and songwriter.

== Biography ==
Ahmed Bukhatir was born in Sharjah, United Arab Emirates. He is the fifth of ten children. His father is Abdul Rahman Bukhatir, who became a successful businessman during the economic boom that occurred in the UAE during the 1970s and 80s. As a child Bukhatir spent several years at an Islamic center in Sharjah learning the rules of Quranic recitation called Tajwid. Bukhatir began singing professionally at the age of 20, and released his first album in 2000 entitled Entasaf Al-Layl. Throughout his recording career he has continued to sing without musical instruments according to the Islamic Sharia law. Along with Islamic nasheeds, Ahmed also performs nasheeds which highlight community issues.

=== Business career ===
Ahmed Bukhatir graduated in 1999 from Al Ain University of Science and Technology. At the age of 29 he became the CEO of Promax ME. He is currently chair of the Mcfadden Group of Companies. In politics, he is an appointee by the Ruler of Sharjah to become a member of the Sharjah Council as a senator. He is the brand ambassador for "Du Telecom", a telecommunications company in the UAE.

== Discography ==
Ahmed Bukhatir has released several albums in English, Arabic, and French.

Year	Title	Songs
2000	Al Quds Tunadeena	Al-Qudsu Tunadeena - Waqafa Al Teflo - Taweel Alshawq- Nasheed Ramadaan - Zayed Al Khair
2001	Entasaf Al-Layl	Ajaban - Kam Tashtaki
2003	Fartaqi	Ya Adheeman - Al Hijab - Al Qur'an - Dar Al Ghorour - Fartaqi - Talib Al Ilm - Ya Eid - Ya Man Yara
2003	Samtan	Ummi - Nasheed Al Shariqah - Mobheron - Lenantaleq - Kayfa Anzahoo - Last Breath
2005	Da'ani	Da'ani - Thalaseemia - It's Time - Iqra - Naseem Al Shawq - Forgive Me - Ya Akhi - Zawjati
2007	Hasanat	Ya Bunaya - Sunna' Al Hayat - Don't Let Me Go! - Ayuhal Hadi - Hijab - Khair Al Khalq - Allah Almighty - Hasanat - Atfalana - I Still Ask
2010	Moments with Allah	Remember Them - Donyal Bashr - Hold these days - La ilaha il Allah - Moth Arafto Allah - Nihayat Ghorba - Pourquoi les hommes pleurent - Udata Durra - Ya ilahi - Yosif

== Performances and concerts ==
Bukhatir first performed in 2002. He performed at the "Holy Qura'an" competition attended by Mohammed Bin Rashid Al Maktoum and Sheikh Abdul Rahman Al Sudais, the imam of the Grand mosque in Mecca, Saudi Arabia. Ahmed has toured in various other nations including India, South Africa, Australia and, most notably, at the Global Peace and Unity event which was held in London, United Kingdom, in 2006. He has performed in London, including a concert at Excel Hall in London and at the Natural History Museum in London. On 3 July 2010, Ahmed performed at the 3rd Annual "Journey of Faith" Conference held in Toronto, Ontario, Canada. On 4 April 2012 he performed at a benefit for the Sightsavers Middle East foundation. In April 2012, he appeared at events sponsored by Furqaan Academy in Dallas, Houston, and Chicago, and in May he performed at conference events staged in Hartford, Connecticut. In March 2018, Bukhatir was appointed as the brand ambassador of the International Schools of Creative Science in UAE. The same year he toured Britain in April. It included performances in Blackburn, Dewsbury, Leicester, East London and Cardiff.
