= Ummati Qad Laha Fajrun =

Unofficial anthem of the Islamic State of Iraq and the Levant

"أمتي قد لاح فجرٌ"

Nasheed by Abu Yasser
- Language: Arabic
- English title: My Ummah, Dawn Has Appeared
- Released: 4 December 2013
- Genre: Nasheed
- Songwriter: Abu Yasser
- Producer: Ajnad Foundation

"Ummati Qad Laha Fajrun" (Arabic: أُمَّتِي قَدْ لَاحَ فَجْرٌ, lit. 'My Ummah, Dawn Has Appeared'), also known as "Dawlat al-Islam Qamat" (Arabic: دَوْلَة اُلْإِسْلَامِ قَامَتْ, lit. 'The Islamic State Has Been Established'), is an Islamist jihadi nasheed (song without music instruments) which became an unofficial anthem of the Islamic State. It was released in December 2013 and soon became their most popular nasheed. The American magazine The New Republic referred to it as the most influential nasheed of 2014.

The chant is a capella apart from sound effects of a sword being unsheathed, feet stomping, and gunfire. It was produced by the Ajnad Foundation, which produces most Islamic State nasheeds. The nasheed has also been used by the Nigerian jihadist group Boko Haram to accompany speeches.

== See also ==
- Salil al-Sawarim, another chant commonly used by IS
- This Is the Home of the Brave, Pashto-language anthem of the Taliban
