= Al-I'tisam Media Foundation =

- مؤسسة الإعتصام للإعلام
- Formation: March 8, 2013; 13 years ago
- Dissolved: April 5, 2015; 11 years ago
- Owner: Islamic State of Iraq (until April 8, 2013); Islamic State (from June 29, 2014)

Al-I'tisam Media Foundation (Arabic: مؤسسة الإعتصام للإعلام, romanized: Muʼassasat al-Iʻtiṣām lil-Iʻlām) was one of the main media foundations of the Islamic State and the Islamic State of Iraq.

== History ==
Al-I'tisam Media Foundation was established in March 8, 2013 under the Islamic State of Iraq after its expansion into Syria during the Syrian civil war. It was first announced through Al-Qaeda online forums that the original publications would be produced via the Global Islamic Media Front.

The media foundation primarily focused on Islamic religious topics during its time of establishment, including the fatwas of Ayman al-Zawahiri and the fatwas of Osama Bin Laden after his assassination. After the establishment of a so-called caliphate under the Islamic State, Al-I'tisam Media Foundation started publishing sermons of Abu Bakr al-Baghdadi, audio addresses from the official Islamic State spokesperson Abu Mohammad al-Adnani, and issues of the English-language magazine Dabiq, French-language magazine Dar al-Islam, and Turkish-language magazine Konstantiniyye.

One of the more religiously motivated videos the media foundation published was the A Window Upon the Land of Epic Battles, a series that focused on the life inside the Islamic State and how the so-called caliphate expanded. Al-I'tisam Media Foundation also published execution videos from the Camp Speicher massacre and other extrajudicial killings. The last official publication by Al-I'tisam Media Foundation was on April 5, 2015, with a video entitled "Repelling of the Safavids in Salah al-Din".
