= Abdul Rahman Bukhatir =

Emirati businessman and cricket patron

- Occupations: Businessman, media entrepreneur, and cricket administrator
- Known for: Developing Sharjah Cricket Stadium; Founding Ten Sports; Founder of the Bukhatir Group
- Children: Ahmed Bukhatir
- Awards: Shyam Bhatia Lifetime Achievement Award (2018)

Abdul Rahman Bukhatir is an Emirati businessman, media entrepreneur, and cricket administrator. He is the founder of the Bukhatir Group which has business interests in construction, education, information technology, real estate, shopping, sports, and leisure sectors. He also founded the sports TV channel Ten Sports. He is known as the Kerry Packer of the Gulf region. He was the founder of Cricketers Benefit Fund Series, which aimed to benefit retired cricketers from the Indian subcontinent. He is the father of Nasheed singer Ahmed Bukhatir and famous Quran reciter Salah Bukhatir.

== Early life ==
Abdul Rahman Bukhatir was born in an Arab family. Bukhatir studied at BVS Parsi School in Karachi, Pakistan. While studying, he was introduced to cricket by his neighbours in Karachi. When he came back to the UAE, he got a few like-minded people together and started playing cricket on matting wickets.

== Career ==
=== Cricket patron ===
He transformed the Sharjah Cricket Stadium, from a stadium in the desert to one of the historic Guinness World Records-holder cricket grounds. In 1981, he organised a cricket match between Gavaskar XI and Miandad XI.

He helped set up the Al Dhaid Cricket Village. He also served as the chairman of the Emirates Cricket Board.

=== Media ===
In January 2001, Bukhatir founded Taj Television Ltd in Dubai.The company launched the TV channel TEN Sports (as part of its Taj Entertainment Network), dedicated to sports on 1 April 2002. Zee Telefilms (Essel Group) bought 50 per cent stake in TEN Sports at an enterprise value of $114 million (₹800 crores) in 2006 and completely acquired it in 2010.

== Awards ==
In February 2018, he received the Lifetime Achievement Award category in the Shyam Bhatia Annual Awards.
