= Da'ani =

Studio album by Ahmed Bukhatir
- Released: 2005
- Genre: Nasheed
- Length: 39:47
- Label: SUNDUS

Ahmed Bukhatir chronology
Samtan (2004)	Da'ani (2005)	Hasanat (2007)

Da'ani (English: Let me) is the 2005 album by Ahmed Bukhatir. It consists of eight nasheeds of which two are in English. These cover various topics ranging from Islamic themes to general community issues. "Ya Akhi" is a nasheed tribute to a brother. The most popular nasheeds are "Zawjati" and "Forgive me". The former pays tributes to the role of wives and the latter offers encouragement to the disabled.

== Track listing ==
#	Title	Length
01.	Ya Akhi (Brother)	5:52
02.	Da’ani (Let Me)	7:07
03.	Thalaseemia	4:46
04.	It’s time	2:47
05.	Iqra ( Read)	5:11
06.	Zawjati (My wife)	5:21
07.	Naseem Al Shawq	4:09
08.	Forgive me	5:54
