= Abu Hajer al-Hadhrami =

Yemeni munshid

Ghalib Bin Ahmed Baquaiti
- Born: 1986; Mukalla, Yemen
- Died: 10 July 2015 (aged 28–29); Mukalla, Yemen
- Other name: Abu Hajar al-Hadhrami
- Occupation: Munshid
- Notable work: "Ḥannā ansār ash-sharīʿa" "Salāmī ʿalā ad-Dawla" "Qādim Jayshī Ilaykum"

Ghalib Bin Ahmed Baquaiti (Arabic: غَالِب بِنْ أَحمَد بَاقُعَيطِي, romanized: Ġālib Bin Aḥmad Bāqu‘ayṭī), also known as Abu Hajar al-Hadhrami (أَبو هَاجِر الحَضرَمِي, Abū Hājir al-Ḥaḍramī; 1986 – July 10, 2015), was a Yemeni jihadist poet and munshid.

== Biography ==
He was born in 1986 in Mukalla, to a Hadhrami family native to the city. He claimed that his interest in poetry started as a child, and that he sang his first nasheed at Al-Manahid Mosque at only 13 years of age. He was also married at a young age. He graduated secondary school and did not pursue a higher education. Abu Hajar traveled to India, and from there to Syria in 2007, until he reached the Syrian-Iraqi border with the aim of entering Iraq, but he was caught by Syrian forces, where he was arrested and tortured for several months in the Air Force Intelligence prison in Damascus, then deported to Yemen, where he was placed in the Political Security Prison in Mukalla with dozens of Al-Qaeda in the Arabian Peninsula militants. Many of the AQAP militants were planning an escape, in which he also participated and escaped prison in May 2011 after digging a tunnel. While in prison he pledged his allegiance to AQAP.

He was one of the pioneers of jihadist nasheeds. His nasheeds were famous for many factors, including the topics, rhythm, background effects, as well as singing in the local Yemeni dialect rather than Standard Arabic. He sang over 90 nasheeds in less than 6 years. Many of his nasheeds praised Osama bin Laden, Abu Musab al-Zarqawi, Abu Bakr al-Baghdadi, and Ahmed al-Sharaa. He made nasheeds for various groups, including Al-Qaeda, Al-Nusra Front, Ansar al-Sharia in Yemen, the Islamic State of Iraq and the Levant, and others. Despite being a member of AQAP, which opposed the Islamic State, his Islamic State nasheeds were released before the rivalry of AQAP and the Islamic State. It was common for AQAP members to support the Islamic State, as Nasir al-Wuhayshi had intended to join the Islamic State if they came to Yemen, although in 2015 he chose to remain with Ayman al-Zawahiri. When the Islamic State eventually came to Yemen in 2015, it also sparked a rivalry and defections amid the Al-Qaeda–Islamic State conflict.

After AQAP took control of Mukalla on April 2, 2015, he made his first public appearance. He was killed in an American airstrike on Mukalla on July 10, 2015, that killed many other significant members of AQAP. At the exact same time, American airstrikes in Syria also killed Maher Meshaal. His funeral was held in his childhood home in Mukalla. Al-Malahem Media released a documentary about his life. Despite him being an official member of AQAP, after his death, there were debates over his allegiance, as members of Al-Qaeda and the Islamic State both claimed that Abu Hajer was loyal to their organisation.

== See also ==
- Maher Meshaal
- Abu Yasser
