= Al-Malhama Al-Kubra =

Prophesied battle of the end times in Islamic eschatology

Al-Malḥamat Al-Kubra (Arabic: الملحمة الكبرى, lit. 'The Greatest Battle') is an apocalyptic war set to occur in the end times according to Islamic eschatology. The Malhama Al-Kubra is prophesied to be the most brutal battle in human history. It generally corresponds to the battle of Armageddon in Christian eschatology, and occurs soon before the emergence of the Dajjal.

== Meaning ==
Al-Malḥamat Al-Kubrā literally means "The Greatest Battle". In Arabic malḥama or malḥamat (plural malāḥim) can signify a fierce war with considerable atrocities and killing, a similar battle within such a war, bloody combat, or massacre or slaughter. In the plural form Malāḥim also came to signify a distinct genre of hadith narrations concerning prophecies of apocalyptic wars and battles. Kubrā is the feminine superlative degree version of the word kabīr, which signifies immensity or greatness. The prefixed article al- makes both words in the phrase definite.

== Significance ==
The Malhama Al-Kubra is detailed in multiple hadith narrations with details. However the basic narrative framework of the cycle of prophecies found in Islamic eschatology is as follows. This battle is said to occur after the Muslims and Christian Romans victoriously fight alongside each other against a common enemy. Following their victory a conflict will break out in which a Christian claims that the cross brought them victory, a Muslim in response claims that God brought them victory and proceeds to destroy the cross, which leads to further reprisals from the Christian side. This culminates in the Malhama Al-Kubra, an apocalyptic scale battle so intense, according to some hadith narrations, that were a bird to pass their flanks, "it would fall down dead before reaching the end of them."

The traditional account according to the Hadiths continues, in the immediate wake of this battle, Constantinople will be conquered by the Muslims (some say this conquest will be made by restoring sharia law in Turkey), which will be followed by the coming of the Antichrist, known in Arabic as Dajjal, which will be followed by the Second Coming – the descent of Jesus Christ (Isa).

Certain places are significant in the Malhama Al-Kubra narrative cycle. One of the significant locations is Dabiq, Syria where many texts say it will take place. Alexandria, Egypt, Damascus, and Jerusalem are also significant places in the prophecies.

== Contemporary interpretations ==
Some contemporary exegetes have linked the Malhama Al-Kubra to an apocalyptic nuclear war within the Middle East between the Israelis and their opponents.

Some contemporary Muslim exegesis suggests that the Romans referred to in the prophecy variously correspond to the Gulf War coalition, or the Russians, because Russia is the most populous Orthodox Christian country and considers itself the inheritor of the Eastern Roman Empire, or contemporary Europeans. Other contemporary interpretations have claimed the Romans referred to as being the inheritors of Rome, including the Ottomans.
