= Al-Bayan (radio station) =

ISIS propaganda radio station

al-Bayan البيان
- Broadcast area: Syria; Iraq; Libya

Programming
- Languages: Arabic, Kurdish, English, French, Russian and other languages
- Format: Religious, news, talk, terrorist propaganda

Ownership
- Owner: Islamic State; (unlicensed)

History
- First air date: 2014

Sample from an English-language news bulletin broadcast in April 2015 on Al-Bayan

Al-Bayan (Arabic: البيان, romanized: al-Bayān, lit. 'The Statement') is the Islamic State's official radio station, formerly based in Iraq, owned and operated by the Islamic State, which broadcast at 92.5 on the FM dial. The station aired a news-talk format and broadcasts in the Arabic, Kurdish, English, French, and Russian languages.

Originating from Mosul, Al-Bayan programs were credited with being "highly professional and slickly produced" and were sometimes compared to NPR and the BBC for tone and quality. Al-Bayan's reporting on IS military operations had been referenced by the Associated Press and The Washington Post''. The station stopped broadcasting after IS lost most of its bases in Iraq and Syria and after the radio station was destroyed by an air raid.

Broadcasts by IS resumed later from Sirte, Libya under the station name "Radio Al-Tawheed".

== Beginnings ==
The first broadcast of Al-Bayan Radio was launched in late 2014, which initially provided newscasts, then some other programs were added in April 2015. The station offered a wide range of programming including nasheed, Quran recitations, speeches, Fiqh, language instruction, and interview shows, interspersed with regular news bulletins and field reports from Al-Bayan correspondents in Iraq and Syria. English-language news bulletins were delivered by an American-accented, male newsreader and datelines are read in the Islamic calendar.

=== Android application ===
In early 2016, Al-Bayan released an Android application, they uploaded the APK file on the Internet Archive and onion websites since the app could not be downloaded on the Google Play Store. They spread the app through social media like Twitter, Facebook, and Telegram.

== Frequencies ==
Known frequencies (October 2016) were:

- Iraq: Mosul 92.5/99.3 FM;
- Syria: Raqqah 99.9 FM
- Libya: Benghazi 94.3 FM (irregular)
- Libya: Darnah 95.5 FM (irregular)

The station in Mosul was reported to have gone off-air after an air strike on it in late February 2017 as part of the Battle of Mosul. Iraqi forces discovered the station in March 2017 in an upscale western Mosul neighborhood they captured. IS had burnt it down before fleeing.

== Libyan broadcasts ==
In February 2015, IS captured a radio station called "Makmadas" in Sirte, Libya. It was nominally run by Ansar Al-Sharia in Libya, which made it unclear whether that station was under IS management. An IS-owned satellite television station and a powerful radio station on 94.3 FM, also based out of Sirte and operating under the brand name "Al-Tawheed," began broadcasting the previous October 2014. Radio Al-Tawheed (former Libyan Jamahiriya Broadcasting Corporation transmitter) have 10 kilowatts output power and is received in Europe via sporadic E propagation.

The station operated in 2015 and 2016 before being overrun by Libyan forces, and ISIS created an Android app for it. In spite of it, IS supporters promotes on 1 May 2019 an Al-Bayan internet radio station to release its contents. It is also active in social media like Facebook or TikTok.

== See also ==
- Mass media use by the Islamic State
