= Ajnad Foundation =

Media wing of the Islamic State

Ajnad Foundation for Media Production مؤسسة أجناد للإنتاج الإعلامي
- Logo (January 2014–present)
- Founded: August 20, 2013
- Founder: Islamic State
- Owner: Islamic State

Ajnad Foundation for Media Production (Arabic: مؤسسة أجناد للإنتاج الإعلامي, romanized: Muʼassasat Ajnād lil-Intāj al-Iʻlāmī), or simply Ajnad Foundation, is one of the official media wings of the Islamic State which produces nasheeds and Quran recitations. It was established in August 2013 and has released more than 150 nasheeds.

== History ==
Ajnad Foundation logo (2013–2014)

Ajnad Foundation began to expand its media presence in 2013 with the formation in March of a second media wing, Al-I'tisam Media Foundation, which specialises in acoustics production for nasheeds with no music, as to adhere to the prohibition of music instruments in Islam, and Qur'anic recitation. Its first published song was titled "Voice of the Prisoner". (Arabic: صوت السجين)

Ajnad Foundation would once again rise to fame when Al-Furqan released Salil al-Sawarim 4 in 2014, which documents IS operations in Iraq and Syria, as well as premiering the famous nasheed Salil al-Sawarim. Another nasheed, called Qariban Qariba (Soon, Soon) would be released, often played alongside the group’s more unusual executions, including the burning of a Jordanian pilot, the burning of a Turkish and a Kurdish soldier, an execution where several prisoners of war were put into a car then shot with a rocket, and another execution where several prisoners would be drowned in a cage. Since then, more famous nasheeds would be released by Ajnad until its hiatus during 2020, when the last known nasheed released by then is "Gharibun Dammani Sha'uthul-Bawadi", sung by Qutaybah Al-Sudani.

In the beginning, munshideen (singers) like Al-Mu'taz bil-'Aziz sang for the foundation. Uqab al-Marzuqi sang 3 nasheeds, 2 recorded under Ajnad and another under Al-Furqan. After his death, Ajnad released a nasheed to commemorate him, sung by Abu Dhar Al-Shalahi

Some of the known later Ajnad munshideen (singers) are Abu Yasser, who produced more than 40 nasheeds under the labels of Al-Ma'sadah, As-Siddiq, Masami' Al-Khayr Founnation, (all affiliated with Al-Qaeda) and Ajnad Foundation. Abu Mu'awiyah Al-Najdi was another prominent munshid of the Islamic State, producing several nasheeds. Khallad al-Qahtani, another prominent singer for Ajnad, produced more than 10 nasheeds which are frequently used by IS media centers. Following his death in the Battle of Baghuz, Abu Bakr al-Baghdadi mentioned him in a video with Al-Furqan Media Production. Maher Meshaal is another Internet-famous munshid who emigrated to the Islamic State from Saudi Arabia in 2013, and sang for Ajnad until his killing in 2015. Abul-Hasan al-Muhajir also was a munshid and the narrator for most Ajnad intros and in this case, other IS official releases; before he was promoted to spokesman of the Islamic State. Abu Hamza al-Qurashi, the spokesman for the Islamic State until his demise in 2021 also produced around 15 nashids during his Ajnad career. Others like Abu Ghuraba' al-Yamani, Abu Bara' al-Madani, which sang a eulogy for the fighters of the Menagh airport siege in 2012–2013, Nimr al-Muhajir, Abu Usamah At-Tunisi, which sang the famous Mawkib Al-Nur nasheed and others are also IS members that emigrated and joined the organization; though their career is not as famed as other munshids. As of now, some of the munshids still remain anonymous to this day. Some unreleased nasheeds are currently in the hands of most of the Islamic State's media department, particularly in Somalia and Africa; and are still unreleased to this day.

Ajnad would return in 2026 with the nasheed titled "Our Army Is Coming For Revenge" (Arabic: جيشنا بالثأر قادم), sung by Qutaybah Al-Sudani.

Ajnad Foundation also produces full Qur'an recitations, which are recited by Abul-Hasan al-Hasani, Abu 'A'ishah, and other unknown people. They have produced 114 Surahs in the recitation of Hafs 'An Asim, and Surah Al-Ra'd in Warsh 'An Nafi'.

On 4 May 2016 Al-Battar Foundation (IS-supporter media) launched an application on Android called "Ajnad" that allows its users to listen to the songs of the Ajnad Foundation on their mobile phones.
