= Al-Furat Media Center =

Islamic State media organization

Al-Furat Media Center مركز الفرات للإعلام
- Founded: 2015
- Founder: Islamic State

Al-Furat Media Center, or Furat Media Foundation (Arabic: مركز الفرات للإعلام, romanized: Markaz al-Furāt lil-Iʿlām, lit. 'Euphrates Media Center'), is an Islamic State media organization established in January 2015. The Al-Furat Media Center produces video, audio, and reading materials in multiple languages; Russian, Kazakh, Turkish, Kyrgyz, Tajik, and Indonesian, in addition to Arabic and English.

== History ==
In the summer of 2016, Al-Furat Media Center launched the Al-Fatihin Magazine in Indonesian. On January 17, 2016, Al-Furat Media Center released the nasheed named (Turkish: Yakında, Yakında, lit. 'Soon, Soon'). This nasheed talks about killing the disbelievers of Islam and filling the roads with blood. On the 19th of September 2018, Al-Furat released an English nasheed entitled "This is 'Ibadah". On May 13, 2022, Al-Furat Media Foundation would release a video on Telegram titled "A Message to the Infidel West" (Arabic: رسالة إلى الغرب الكافر, romanized: Risālat ʾilā al-Gharb al-Kāfir).
