= Amaq News Agency =

Islamic State-affiliated news outlet

Amaq News Agency وكالة أعماق الإخبارية
- Type: News service
- Availability: Active
- Founded: Islamic State by Baraa Kadek, Abu Muhammad al-Furqan and others
- Launch date: 14 August 2014; 12 years ago
- Language: Arabic and English

Amaq News Agency (Arabic: وكالة أعماق الإخبارية, romanized: Wakālat Aʻmāq al-Ikhbārīyah) is a news outlet linked to the Islamic State (IS). Amaq is often the "first point of publication for claims of responsibility" for terrorist attacks in Western countries by the Islamic State. In March 2019, Amaq News Agency was designated as a foreign terrorist organization by the United States Department of State.

== History ==
Among the founders of Amaq was Syrian journalist Baraa Kadek, who joined IS in late 2013, Abu Muhammad al-Furqan, and seven others who originally worked for Halab News Network. According to The New York Times, it has a direct connection with IS, from which it "gets tips". Its name was taken from Amik Valley in Hatay Province, which is mentioned in a hadith as the site of an "apocalyptic victory over non-believers".

Amaq News Agency was first noticed by SITE during the Siege of Kobanî (Syria) in 2014, when its updates were shared among IS fighters. It became more widely known after it began reporting claims of responsibility for terrorist attacks in Western countries, such as the 2015 San Bernardino attack, for which IS officially claimed responsibility the next day. An Amaq cameraman shot the first footage of the capture of Palmyra in 2015.

Amaq launched an official mobile app in 2015 and has warned against unofficial versions that reportedly have been used to spy on its users. It also uses a Telegram account. It had a WordPress-based blog, but it was removed without explanation in April 2016.

On 12 June 2016, IS claimed responsibility for the Pulse nightclub shooting through Amaq, without prior knowledge of the attack. The shooter, Omar Mateen had later pledged allegiance to IS via a phone call with emergency services.

On 31 May 2017, a Facebook post announced Amaq's founder, Baraa Kadek AKA Rayan Meshaal, had been killed with his daughter by an American airstrike on Mayadin. The post was reportedly made by his younger brother. Reuters could not immediately verify this account. On 27 July 2017, the US confirmed that Kadek had been killed by a coalition airstrike near Mayadin between 25 and 27 May 2017.

In June 2017, German police arrested a 23-year-old Syrian man identified only as Mohammed G., accusing him of communicating with the alleged perpetrator of the 2016 Malmö Muslim community centre arson in order to report to Amaq.

On 21 March 2019, the U.S. Department of State officially deemed Amaq an alias of IS, and thus a Foreign Terrorist Organization.

On 22 March 2024, the Islamic State claimed responsibility for the Crocus City Hall attack through Amaq, U.S. officials confirmed the claim shortly after. A day after the attack, Amaq published a video of the attack, filmed by one of the attackers. It showed the attackers shooting victims and slitting the throat of another, while the filming attacker praises Allah and speaks against infidels.

== Character ==
Amaq publishes a stream of short news reports, both text and video, on the mobile app Telegram. The reports take on the trappings of mainstream journalism, with "Breaking News" headings, and embedded reporters at the scenes of IS battles. The reports try to appear neutral, toning down the jihadist language and sectarian slurs IS uses in its official releases.

Charlie Winter of the Transcultural Conflict and Violence Initiative at Georgia State University, and Rita Katz of SITE Intelligence Group in Washington say Amaq functions much like the state-owned news agency of IS, though the group does not acknowledge it as such. Katz said it behaves "like a state media". Amaq appears to have been allowed to develop by IS as a way to have a news outlet that is controlled by the group but is somewhat removed from it, giving IS more of the appearance of legitimacy.

== Reliability ==
According to Rukmini Callimachi in The New York Times: "Despite a widespread view that the Islamic State opportunistically claims attacks with which it has little genuine connection, its track record—minus a handful of exceptions—suggests a more rigorous protocol. At times, the Islamic State has got details wrong, or inflated casualty figures, but the gist of its claims is typically correct." According to Callimachi, the group considers itself responsible for acts carried out by people who were inspired by its propaganda, as well as acts carried out by its own personnel and in some instances, had claimed attacks before the identities of the killers were known.

Graeme Wood writing in The Atlantic in October 2017, wrote "The idea that the Islamic State simply scans the news in search of mass killings, then sends out press releases in hope of stealing glory, is false. Amaq may learn details of the attacks from mainstream media ... but its claim of credit typically flows from an Amaq-specific source."

An October 2017 article in The Hill, points to two false claims made in the summer of 2017, the Resorts World Manila attack and a false claim that bombs had been planted at Charles de Gaulle Airport in Paris. Also, a claimed IS connection to the 2017 Las Vegas shooting proved to be false.

According to Rita Katz on the SITE Intelligence Group website, calling a terrorist a "soldier of the caliphate (warrior from the caliphate)" in a statement issued by Amaq, was the usual way in which IS indicated that it inspired an attack. Centrally coordinated attacks were usually described as "executed by a detachment belonging to the Islamic State", and were often announced by both Amaq and by IS' central media command.

== Online presence ==
In November 2019, Belgian police said they had carried out a successful cyberattack on Amaq, thus leaving IS without an operational communication channel. However, Amaq has since regained online presence, primarily on dark web platforms to make it harder for law enforcement to take them down without physical access to the server hosting the specific platform.
