= I'lam Foundation =

Multilingual Islamic State online publisher

- أساس إعلام
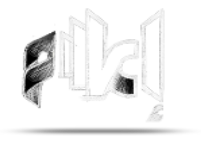
- Dates active: 2018–June 2024
- Allegiance: Islamic State

The I'lam Foundation (Arabic: مؤسسة إعلام, romanized: Mo'āssasat Iʻlām) was a multi-language media center of the Islamic State that provides content in the languages of, English, French, Uzbek, Hindi, Arabic, Malayalam, Turkish, Pashto, Persian, Spanish, Indonesian, German, Bosnian, Hausa, Albanian, Tajik, Uyghur, Kurdish, Somali, Amharic, Swahili, Bengali, and Maldivian like the media center Al-Hayat Media Center.

In June 2024 it was dismantled by judicial and law enforcement authorities across Europe and United States in a large-scale operation to disrupt platforms and websites for terrorist communications, propaganda and radical messages.

== Funding ==
I'lam foundation normally gets its funding from outside cryptocurrency donations, such as Monero, mainly from Islamic State supporters from western countries,

== Usage ==
ISIS–K has used I'lam foundation in order to fund the Islamic State and ISIS–K using Russian bank networks, they used I'lam foundation to spread awareness about their funding platform. ISIS–K used I'lam foundation's clear net and dark net website. The IMU has mostly used I'lam foundation for its Uzbek-language platform to spread its propaganda videos.

== Halummu ==
Halummu is an English jihadist translation service, translating daily messages, leadership statements, periodicals, and videos created by the Islamic State. It shares its content primarily through Telegram or on ISIS' official website and is the sole English unit operating under the multilingual Fursan al-Tarjuma umbrella.
