= Istok (magazine) =

Former Russian-language online magazine published by the Islamic State

- ИСТОК magazine advertisement as posted by IS
- Categories: Islamic, news
- Founder: Al-Hayat Media Center
- Founded: 2015
- Final issue Number: 2016; 4
- Language: Russian

Istok (Russian: Исток, meaning "The Source") was the title of a Russian-language online magazine published by the Islamic State (IS) and released by Al-Hayat Media Center.

As of late 2016, Istok had apparently been supplanted by Rumiyah.

== Issues ==
The magazine issued four issues, starting from Rajab 1436 AH (2014/2015 CE) to Rajab 1437 AH (2015/2016 CE), before it was replaced by Rumiyah magazine.

Issue	Data	Pgs
1	Rajab 1436 AH	23
2	Shawwal 1436 AH	44
3	Safar 1437 AH	70
4	Rajab 1437 AH	42

== See also ==
- Dabiq (magazine)
- Dar al-Islam (magazine)
- Konstantiniyye (magazine)
