= Konstantiniyye (magazine) =

Former Turkish-language magazine of the Islamic State

- Categories: Propaganda
- First issue: June 2015
- Final issue: 2016
- Based in: Syria
- Language: Turkish

Konstantiniyye (Arabic: القسطنطينية, romanized: al-Qusṭanṭīnīyah, lit. 'Constantinople') was a Turkish-language online magazine published online by the Islamic State (IS) for propaganda and recruitment, and released by al-Hayat Media Center. Konstantiniyye is the old Ottoman name for present day Istanbul.

The magazine published anti-Turkish messages and targeted Turkish president Recep Tayyip Erdoğan, and the current Peoples' Democratic Party, as well as one of its militant enemies, the PKK.

In late 2016, Konstantiniyye was replaced by Rumiyah.

== See also ==
- Dabiq (magazine)
- Dar al-Islam (magazine)
- Istok (magazine)
