= Dar al-Islam (magazine) =

Former French-language magazine of the Islamic State

- The first issue of Dar al-Islam
- Categories: Online magazine for propaganda
- Frequency: Variable
- Founder: Islamic State
- Founded: 2014
- First issue: 23 December 2014
- Final issue: 2016
- Language: French

Dar al-Islam (Arabic: دار الإسلام, romanized: Dār al-ʾIslām, lit. 'House of Islam') was the title of a French-language online magazine produced by the Islamic State (IS) between 2014 and 2016. It included articles praising terrorist attacks in France, such as the 2016 Nice truck attack and the January 2015 Île-de-France attacks.

As of late 2016, Dar al-Islam had apparently been replaced by Rumiyah. In all, 10 editions of the magazine were released and project jihadology.net has unaltered versions available online.

== See also ==
- Dabiq (magazine)
- Istok (magazine)
- Konstantiniyye (magazine)
- Rumiyah (magazine)
