= Salil al-Sawarim =

2014 ISIS nasheed by Abu Yasser

Hymn by Abu Yasser
- Language: Arabic
- English title: Clashing of the Swords
- Released: May 2014
- Genre: Nasheed
- Length: 3:08
- Producer: Ajnad Foundation

Audio of Salil al-Sawarim

Salil al-Sawarim (Arabic: صليل الصوارم, romanized: Ṣalīl aṣ-Ṣawārim, "Clashing of the swords") is a nasheed (chant) produced by the Islamic State in 2014 and used in Islamic State propaganda as a theme. It is a melodic a cappella hymn, in which the lyrics discuss bloodshed and war.

The nasheed was produced by the Ajnad Foundation, with the recitation of the vocalist Abu Yasser, the most well known vocalist of the group. Salil al-Sawarim is among the best known IS nasheeds. It appeared in IS' fourth installment of the Salil al-Sawarim video series, which among other things contain medleys of executions, and was published by Al-Furqan Foundation.

Due to the nasheed being related to terrorism, it is commonly removed from popular music and video platforms such as SoundCloud, Spotify, YouTube or justpaste.it.

== Lyrics ==
These are the lyrics of the nasheed:

Arabic

صليلُ الصوارم نشيدُ الأباة
ودربَ القتال طريق الحياة
فبين اقتحام يبيد الطغاة
وكاتمُ صوتِ جميلِ صداه
صليلُ الصوارم نشيدُ الأباة
ودربَ القتال طريق الحياة
فبين اقتحام يبيد الطغاة
وكاتم صوت جميل صداه

به عزّ ديني وذلّ البغاه
فيا قومي هبُّوا لدرب الكُماة
فإما حياة تسر الهدى
وإما ممات يُغيظ العداة
وإما ممات يُغيظ العداة

صليلُ الصوارم نشيدُ الأباة
ودربَ القتال طريق الحياة
فبين اقتحام يبيد الطغاة
وكاتمُ صوتِ جميلِ صداه

فقم يا اخى لدرب النجاه
لنمضى سوياً نصد الغزاه
ونرفع مجد ونعلى جباه
ابت ان تَذٍلَ لغيرَ الاله
ابت ان تَذٍلَ لغيرَ الاله

صليلُ الصوارم نشيدُ الأباة
ودربَ القتال طريق الحياة
فبين اقتحام يبيد الطغاة
وكاتمُ صوتِ جميلِ صداه
صليلُ الصوارم نشيدُ الأباة
ودربَ القتال طريق الحياة
فبين اقتحام يبيد الطغاة
وكاتم مصوت جميل صداه

الَى الحق هيا دعانا لواه
لساح المنايا لحرب عداه
فمن مات منا فدا عن حماه
بجنات خلدٌ سيغدوا عزاه
بجنات خلدٌ سيغدوا عزاه

صليلُ الصوارم نشيدُ الأباة
ودربَ القتال طريق الحياة
فبين اقتحام يبيد الطغاة
وكاتمُ صوت جميل صداه
صليلُ الصوارم نشيدُ الأباة
ودربَ القتال طريق الحياة
فبين اقتحام يبيد الطغاة
وكاتم مصوت جميل صداه

صليلُ الصوارم نشيدُ الأباة
ودربَ القتال طريق الحياة
فبين اقتحام يبيد الطغاة
وكاتم مصوت جميل صداه

Transliteration

Ṣalīl uṣ-ṣawārim nashīd ul-ubāh
Wa darb ul-qitāli ṭarīq ul-ḥayāh
Fabayn aqtiḥāmin yubīd uṭ-ṭughāh
Wa kātimu ṣawtin jamīlun ṣadāh
Ṣalīl uṣ-ṣawārim nashīd ul-ubāh
Wa darb ul-qitāli ṭarīq ul-ḥayāh
Fabayn aqtiḥāmin yubīd uṭ-ṭughāh
Wa kātimu ṣawtin jamīlun ṣadāh

Bihi ʿizza dīnī wa dhall al-bughāh
fayā qawmī hubbū lidarb il-kumāh
Faʾimā ḥayātun tasur ul-hudā
Waʾimā mamātun yughīẓ ul-ʿudāh
Waʾimā mamātun yughīẓ ul-ʿudāh

Ṣalīl uṣ-ṣawārim nashīd ul-ubāh
Wa darb ul-qitāli ṭarīq ul-ḥayāh
Fabayn aqtiḥāmin yubīd uṭ-ṭughāh
Wa kātimu ṣawtin jamīlun ṣadāh

Faqum yā akhī lidarb in-najāh
linamḍī sawiyan naṣud ul-ghuzāh
Wa narfaʿu majida wa nuʿlī jibāh
Abat an tadhila lighayr il-ilah
Abat an tadhila lighayr il-ilah

Ṣalīl uṣ-ṣawārim nashīd ul-ubāh
Wa darb ul-qitāli ṭarīq ul-ḥayāh
Fabayn aqtiḥāmin yubīd uṭ-ṭughāh
Wa kātimu ṣawtin jamīlun ṣadāh
Ṣalīl uṣ-ṣawārim nashīd ul-ubāh
Wa darb ul-qitāli ṭarīq ul-ḥayāh
Fabayn aqtiḥāmin yubīd uṭ-ṭughāh
Wa kātimu ṣawtin jamīlun ṣadāh

Ilā al-ḥaqqi hayā daʿānā liwāh
Lisāḥ il-manāyā liḥarbi ʿadāh
Faman māta minnā fadan ʿan ḥimāh
Bijannāti khuldun sayaghdū ʿazāh
Bijannāti khuldun sayaghdū ʿazāh

Ṣalīl uṣ-ṣawārim nashīd ul-ubāh
Wa darb ul-qitāli ṭarīq ul-ḥayāh
Fabayn aqtiḥāmin yubīd uṭ-ṭughāh
Wa kātimu ṣawtin jamīlun ṣadāh
Ṣalīl uṣ-ṣawārim nashīd ul-ubāh
Wa darb ul-qitāli ṭarīq ul-ḥayāh
Fabayn aqtiḥāmin yubīd uṭ-ṭughāh
Wa kātimu ṣawtin jamīlun ṣadāh

Ṣalīl uṣ-ṣawārim nashīd ul-ubāh
Wa darb ul-qitāli ṭarīq ul-ḥayāh
Fabayn aqtiḥāmin yubīd uṭ-ṭughāh
Wa kātimu ṣawtin jamīlun ṣadāh

Translation

Clashing of the swords, the anthem of the defiant,
The path of fighting is the path of life.
In the midst of assault, tyrants are destroyed,
And suppressing the sound brings a beautiful echo.
Clashing of the swords, the anthem of the defiant,
The path of fighting is the path of life.
In the midst of assault, tyrants are destroyed,
And suppressing the sound brings a beautiful echo.

By it, my faith is exalted, and oppressors are humbled.
So, O my people, arise on the path of the brave.
Either a life that delights the guided,
Or a death that vexes the enemy.
Or a death that vexes the enemy.

Clashing of the swords, the anthem of the defiant,
The path of fighting is the path of life.
In the midst of assault, tyrants are destroyed,
And suppressing the sound brings a beautiful echo.

So rise, my brother, on the path of salvation,
Let us march together to repel the invaders,
Raise our glory and lift our foreheads,
Which refuse to bow to any but Allah.
Which refuse to bow to any but Allah.

Clashing of the swords, the anthem of the defiant,
The path of fighting is the path of life.
In the midst of assault, tyrants are destroyed,
And suppressing the sound brings a beautiful echo.
Clashing of the swords, the anthem of the defiant,
The path of fighting is the path of life.
In the midst of assault, tyrants are destroyed,
And suppressing the sound brings a beautiful echo.

To the truth, the banner calls us,
To the field of fate, to wage war on the enemy.
Whoever among us dies, in sacrifice for his homeland,
In eternal paradise, he will find solace.
In eternal paradise, he will find solace.

Clashing of the swords, the anthem of the defiant,
The path of fighting is the path of life.
In the midst of assault, tyrants are destroyed,
And suppressing the sound brings a beautiful echo.
Clashing of the swords, the anthem of the defiant,
The path of fighting is the path of life.
In the midst of assault, tyrants are destroyed,
And suppressing the sound brings a beautiful echo.

Clashing of the swords, the anthem of the defiant,
The path of fighting is the path of life.
In the midst of assault, tyrants are destroyed,
And suppressing the sound brings a beautiful echo.

== See also ==
- Dawlat al-Islam Qamat, an unofficial anthem of IS
