= Dabiq (magazine) =

Online magazine of the Islamic State, 2014–2016

Dabiq دابق
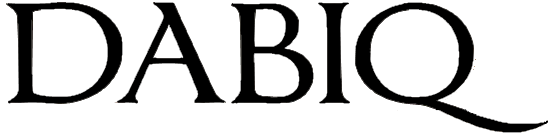

- Cover of the July 2014 issue (The Return of Khilafah) in English
- Categories: Online magazine
- Frequency: Variable; one issue every 54 days on average
- Format: Jihadist propaganda
- Circulation: Worldwide (deep web)
- Publisher: Al-Hayat Media Center
- Founder: Islamic State
- First issue: 5 July 2014
- Final issue: 31 July 2016
- Country: Iraq and Syria
- Based in: Raqqa, Syria
- Language: English (primarily); Arabic; German; French

Dabiq (Arabic: دابق) was a Raqqa-based online magazine of the Islamic State, published via the deep web from July 2014 to July 2016 (Ramadan 1435 to Shawwal 1437). One of the many forms of Islamic State mass media, it took part in religious outreach to Muslims around the world, ultimately seeking to gain new recruits for the "caliphate" by encouraging Muslims to immigrate to Islamic State territory. In addition to Arabic, the magazine's content was written in a number of different languages, including English.

The magazine was named after the town of Dabiq, Syria, which is believed in Islamic eschatology to be the primary location where Muslims will fight and bring about Jesus Christ (‘Isa ibn Maryam) and the fall of the Anti-Christ (al-Masih ad-Dajjal) (see Al-Malhama Al-Kubra), preceding the Day of Judgement.

== Details ==
Dabiq was published by IS via the deep web, although it was widely available online through other sources. The first issue carried the date "Ramadan 1435" in the Islamic Hijri calendar. According to the magazine, its name was taken from the town of Dabiq in northern Syria, which is mentioned in a hadith about the End Times. IS believes Dabiq is where Muslim and infidel forces will eventually face each other, and that after the Crusaders' forces are defeated, the apocalypse will begin. Every issue of Dabiq contained a quote attributed to Abu Musab al-Zarqawi: "The spark has been lit here in Iraq, and its heat will continue to intensify — by Allah's permission — until it burns the Crusader armies in Dabiq".

Harleen K. Gambhir of the Institute for the Study of War considered that while al-Qaeda in the Arabian Peninsula's magazine Inspire focuses on encouraging its readers to carry out lone-wolf attacks on the West, Dabiq was more concerned with establishing the religious legitimacy of IS and its self-proclaimed caliphate, and encouraging Muslims to emigrate there. In its October 2014 issue, an article outlined religious justifications for slavery and praised its revival.

IS used its Dabiq magazine to express its strong opposition to groups including Christians, Jews, Hindus, Shia Muslims and the Muslim Brotherhood.

In September 2016, IS replaced Dabiq with another online magazine, Rumiyah (Arabic for Rome), published in English and other languages. Analysts speculated this was due to IS being driven out of the town of Dabiq by the Turkish Military and Syrian Rebels in October 2016. The new title refers to an Islamic prophecy about the fall of Rome.

== Issues ==
Issue	Cover title (Note: English-language cover titles)	Date (Hijri) (Note: Islamic Hijri calendar, used by Dabiq)	Date (Gregorian)	Publication frequency (Note: Days from previous edition)
1	"The Return of Khilafah"	Ramadan 1435	5 July 2014	
2	"The Flood"	Ramadan 1435	27 July 2014	22
3	"A Call to Hijrah"	Shawwal 1435	10 September 2014	45
4	"The Failed Crusade"	Dhul-Hijjah 1435	11 October 2014	31
5	"Remaining and Expanding"	Muharram 1436	21 November 2014	41
6	"Al Qa'idah of Waziristan: A Testimony from Within"	Rabi' Al-Awwal 1436	29 December 2014	38
7	"From Hypocrisy to Apostasy: The Extinction of the Grayzone"	Rabi'Al-Akhir 1436	12 February 2015	45
8	"Shari'ah Alone Will Rule Africa"	Jumada al-Akhirah 1436	30 March 2015	46
9	"They Plot and Allah Plots"	Sha'ban 1436	21 May 2015	52
10	"The Law of Allah or the Laws of Men"	Ramadan 1436	13 July 2015	53
11	"From the Battles of Al-Ahzāb to the War of Coalitions"	Dhul Qa'Dah 1436	9 September 2015	27
12	"Just Terror"	Safar 1437	18 November 2015	101
13	"The Rafidah from Ibn Saba' to the Dajjal"	Rabi'Al-Akhir 1437	19 January 2016	62
14	"The Murtadd Brotherhood"	Rajab 1437	13 April 2016	85
15	"Break the Cross"	Shawwal 1437	31 July 2016	109

== See also ==
- Dar al-Islam (magazine)
- Konstantiniyye (magazine)
- Istok (magazine)
- Rumiyah (magazine)
