= Rumiyah (magazine) =

Online magazine published by the Islamic State

- Rumiyah (Issue 1)
- Categories: Online magazine for propaganda
- Frequency: Approximately monthly
- Founder: Islamic State
- Founded: 2016
- First issue: September 5, 2016
- Final issue: September 9, 2017
- Country: Syria (under Islamic State control)
- Based in: Raqqa
- Language: Arabic, Bosnian, English, German, French, Indonesian, Turkish, Uyghur, Urdu

Rumiyah (Arabic: رومية, romanized: Rūmiyah, lit. 'Rome') was an online magazine used by the Islamic State (IS) for propaganda and recruitment. It was first published in September 2016 and was released in several languages, including English, French, German, Russian, Indonesian, Bosnian and Uyghur.

The magazine replaced Dabiq, Dar al-Islam and other magazines that were released until mid-2016. Analysts attributed the change of name partly to the imminent loss of the town of Dabiq to a Turkish-led military offensive, which occurred in October 2016.

The name Rumiyah (Rome) was a reference to a hadith in which Muhammed said that Muslims would conquer both Constantinople and Rome in that order.

Like Dabiq, each issue opened with a quote attributed to Abu Hamza al-Muhajir: "O muwahhidin, rejoice, for by Allah, we will not rest from our jihad except beneath the olive trees of Rumiyah (Rome)."

The first issue was released after the death of IS spokesman Abu Mohammad al-Adnani, who was featured heavily in the magazine. In October 2016, IS released the second issue of the magazine in which it justified attacks against non-Muslims, including detailed descriptions of how to carry out knife attacks on smaller groups of people and argued that jihadists throughout Muslim history have "struck the necks of the kuffar" (unbelievers) in the name of Allah with "swords, severing limbs and piercing the fleshy meat of those who opposed Islam." The magazine advised its readers that knives are easy to obtain and hide and that they make good, deadly weapons where Muslims might be regarded with suspicion.

== Issues ==
Issue	Date (Hijri) (Note: Islamic Hijri calendar, used by Rumiyah)	Date (Gregorian)	Pages	Publication frequency (Note: Days from previous edition)
1	Dhul-Hijjah 1437	5 September 2016	38	
2	Muharram 1438	4 October 2016	38	29
3	Safar 1438	11 November 2016	46	38
4	Rabi al-Awwal 1438	7 December 2016	40	26
5	Rabi al-Akhir 1438	6 January 2017	44	31
6	Jumada al-awwal 1438	4 February 2017	44	29
7	Jumada al-akhirah 1438	7 March 2017	38	31
8	Rajab 1438	4 April 2017	48	28
9	Sha'ban 1438	4 May 2017	58	43
10	Ramadan 1438	17 June 2017	46	31
11	Shawwal 1438	13 July 2017	60	26
12	Dhu al-Qidah 1438	6 August 2017	46	26
13	Dhul-Hijjah 1438	9 September 2017	44	34

== See also ==
- Dar al-Islam (magazine)
- Konstantiniyye (magazine)
- Dabiq (magazine)
- Istok (magazine)
