= Nasheed =

Type of vocal music in the Islamic world

A nasheed (Arabic: نَشِيد, romanized: nashīd, lit. 'chant', pl. أَنَاشِيد, anāshīd) is a work of Islamic vocal music, popular throughout the Muslim world and partially coincident with hymns, that is either sung a cappella or with instruments. A nasheed performer is called a "nashidist" in English and munshid in Arabic (مُنْشِد, Munshid, f. مُنْشِدَة, Munshidah, pl. مُنْشِدِين, Munshidīn).

The material and lyrics of a nasheed usually reference Islamic beliefs, history, religion, and current events.

== Scholars on instruments ==
The founders of all four of the major madhabs – Islamic schools of thought – and many other prominent scholars, have debated the legitimacy and use of musical instruments. For instance, according to the Hanafi school of thought, associated with the scholar Abu Hanifa, if a person is known to play musical instruments to divert people from God, their testimony is not to be accepted.

According to the widely acknowledged book of authentic hadiths Sahih al-Bukhari of Sunni scholarship, Muhammad taught that musical instruments are sinful:

Abu 'Amir or Abu Malik Al-Ash'ari [a companion of Muhammad] said that he heard Muhammad saying: "From among my followers there will be some people who will consider illegal sexual intercourse, the wearing of silk, the drinking of alcoholic drinks and the use of musical instruments, as lawful. And there will be some people who will stay near the side of a mountain and in the evening their shepherd will come to them with their sheep and ask them for something, but they will say to him, 'Return to us tomorrow.' Allah will destroy them during the night and will let the mountain fall on them, and He will transform the rest of them into monkeys and pigs and they will remain so till the Day of Resurrection."

There is also evidence for music being permitted in the same book. Aisha said:

Abu Bakr came to my house while two small Ansari girls were singing beside me the stories of the Ansar concerning the Day of Buath. And they were not singers. Abu Bakr said protestingly, "Musical instruments of Satan in the house of Allah's Messenger!" It happened on the `Id day and Allah's Messenger said, "O Abu Bakr! There is an `Id for every nation and this is our `Id."

A few historical Islamic scholars such as Al-Ghazali have also said that musical instruments may be used as long as the songs are not promoting that which is Haraam.

== Modern interpretations ==
A new generation of nasheed artists use a wide variety of musical instruments in their art. Many new nasheed artists are non-Arabs and sing in different languages. Some nasheed bands are Native Deen, Outlandish, and Raihan. Other well-known artists are Ahmed Bukhatir, Meshary Al-Arada, Yusuf Islam (formerly known as Cat Stevens), Sami Yusuf, Junaid Jamshed Khan, Vital Signs, Maher Zain, Harris J, Siedd, Sulthan Ahmed, Humood AlKhudher, Hamza Namira, Rahat Fateh Ali Khan, Atif Aslam, Raef, Mesut Kurtis, S'nada, Dawud Wharnsby, Zain Bhikha, Milad Raza Qadri, Muhammad Al Muqit, Mishary bin Rashid Alafasy, Abu Ubayda, Abu Ali (Musa al-Umaira), Abu Abd ul-Malik (Mohsin al-Dosari) and Abu Assim.

Nasheed artists appeal to a worldwide Muslim audience and may perform at Islamic oriented festivals (such as Mawlid), conferences, concerts and shows, including ISNA. Other artists and organisations such as Nasheed Bay promote an instrument-free stance, differing from the current trends of the increasing usage of instruments in nasheeds.

Many Shia groups such as Hezbollah don't follow the ruling of musical instruments in Islam. Their nasheeds are filled with drums and extreme autotune. In Alawite nasheeds, the singer mostly shouts and praises Ali. Some Bosnian nasheeds during the Yugoslav Wars were sung within the genre turbofolk.

== Propaganda ==
Nasheeds are also used to spread propaganda. A notable example is from a Taliban nasheed called This Is the Home of the Brave. Islamic State is known for the use of nasheeds in their videos and propaganda, notable examples being the arabic chant Dawlat al-Islam Qamat ("The Islamic State Has Been Established"), which came to be viewed as an unofficial anthem of ISIS, and Salil al-sawarim ("Clashing of Swords"). ISIS also spreads nasheeds in the Spanish language. Famous jihadist munshids include Maher Meshaal and Abu Hajer al-Hadhrami.

In 2017, a Uyghur activist in Turkey claimed that nasheeds caused radicalisation, stating that "there's no doubt that anashīd played an important role in stirring up the young people and encouraging them to fight in these wars. People listen to anashīd, and they cry. They try to get people emotional, excited, to inspire them. Their aim is to target young people who aren't clear in their minds, to get them to join their jihad. This is not true Islam, persuading young people to go and get themselves killed."

== See also ==
- Arabic music
- Arabic poetry
- Durood
- Haḍra
- Hamd
- Haram
- Islamic music
- Islamic poetry
- Madih nabawi
- Majid Kids TV
- Mawlid
- Mehfil
- Ya Muhammad
- Sufi music
- Sufi poetry
