= List of converts to Islam =

Many people converted to Islam from a different religion or no religion. The list is categorized alphabetically .

Conversion to Islam has seen enormous growth throughout the West since the 1980s. According to The New York Times, 25,000 Americans convert to Islam every year. According to The Guardian, about 5,000 British people convert to Islam every year, mostly women. According to The Jerusalem Post, in the United Kingdom and France, up to 100,000 people converted in the last decade in each country. Converts to Islam in Australia are estimated at 100,000, representing more than 15% of the Muslim community in Australia. Conversion to Islam has grown across Latin America over the past two decades. Among Latinos in the United States, some estimates put the number of converts near 200,000. Converts make up roughly half of the Muslim population in Bogotá and Mexico, and in some Mexican mosques they are the majority of attendees. In Argentina, non-Arab Muslims make up about half the membership of some organizations, and even more in Sufi groups. In Rio de Janeiro, the share of converts in the Sunni community rose from 50% in 2000 to 85% in 2009. According to the Ministry of Islamic Affairs, Dawah and Guidance, 347,646 people converted to Islam in Saudi Arabia between 2019 and 2023.

== Alphabetical order by last name ==
=== A ===
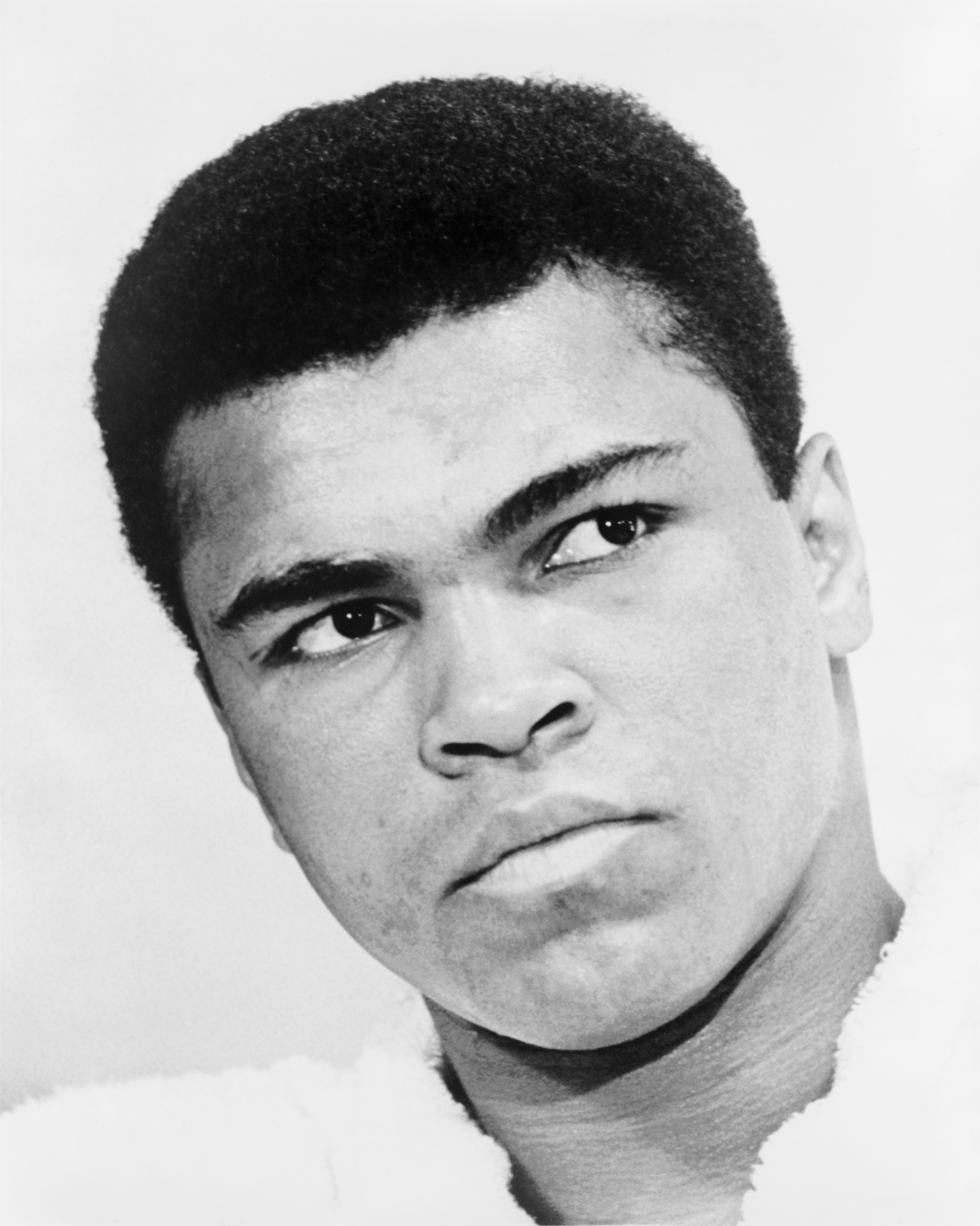
Muhammad Ali, American professional boxer and activist. He is often regarded as the greatest heavyweight boxer of all time.

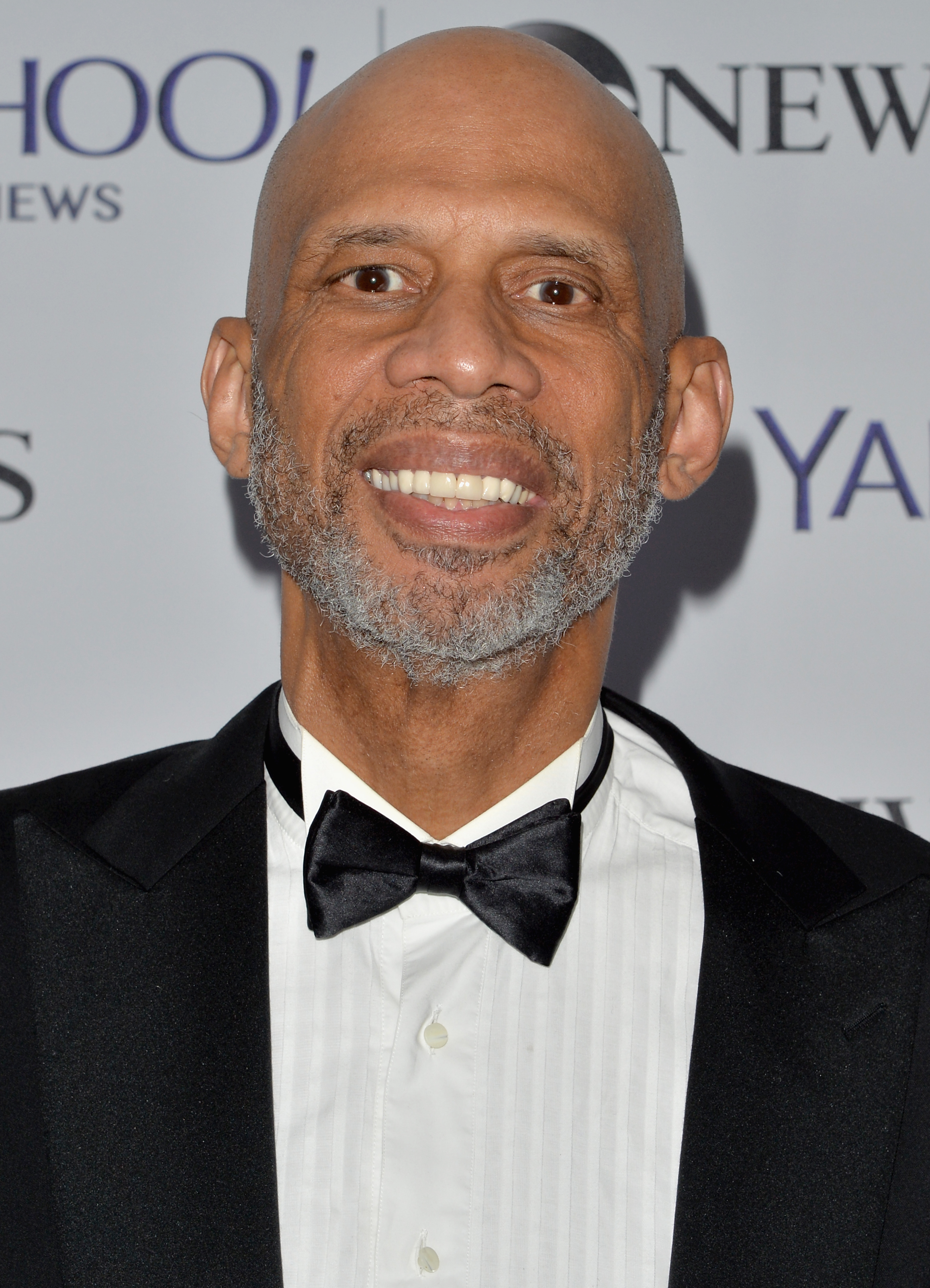
Kareem Abdul-Jabbar, American former professional basketball player. Widely regarded as one of the greatest players of all time.

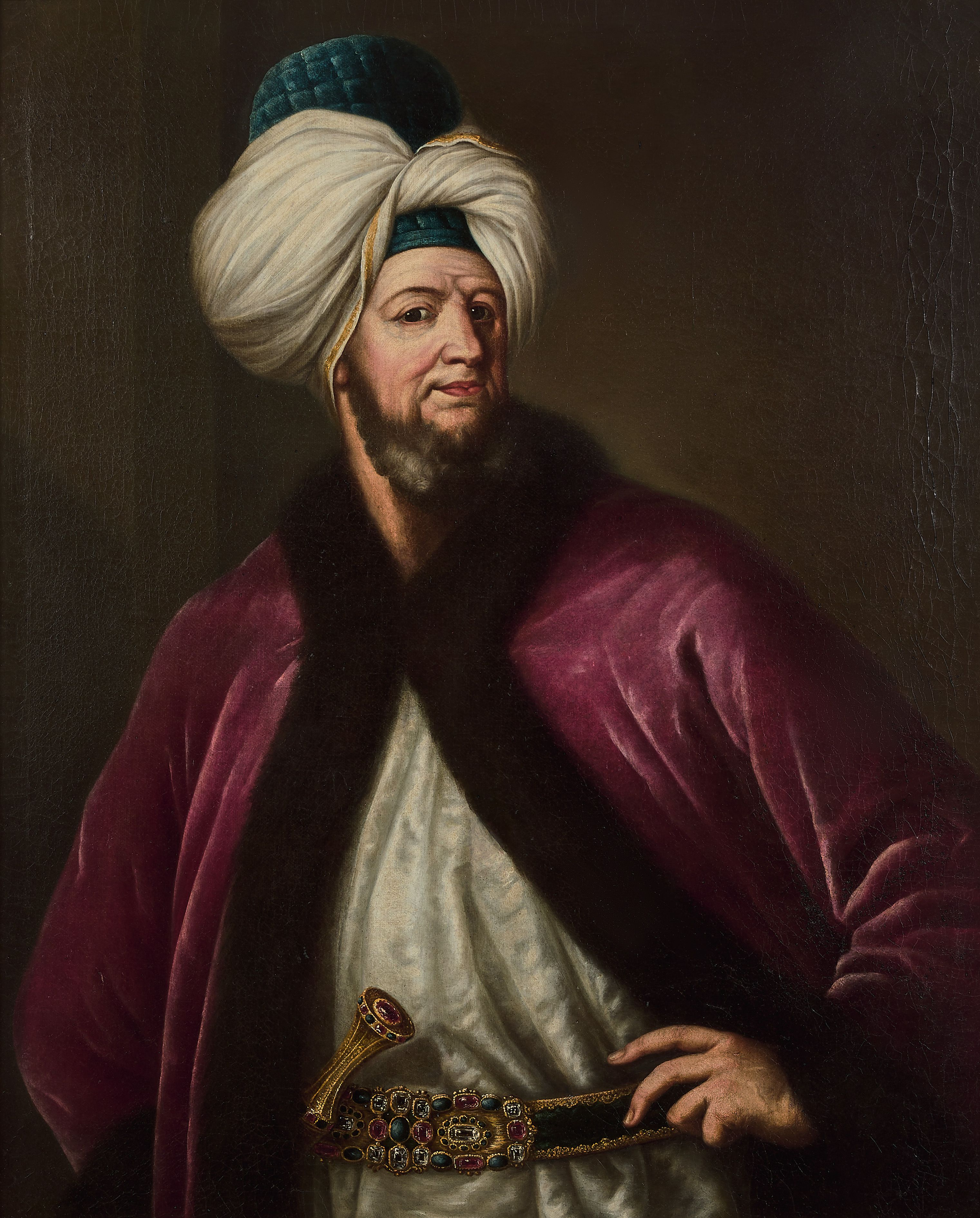
Claude Alexandre de Bonneval, French army officer who later went into the service of the Ottoman Empire.

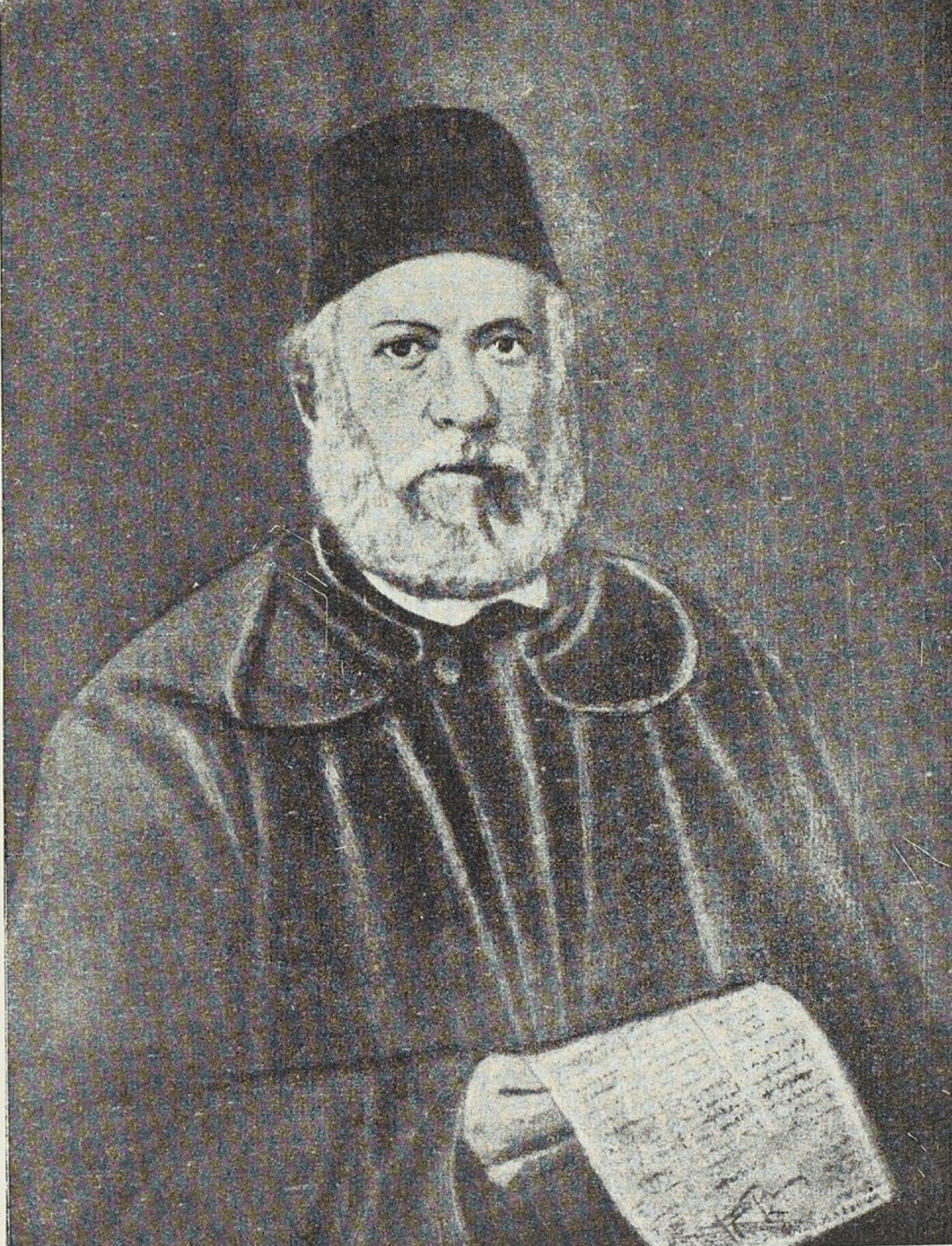
Ahmad Faris al-Shidyaq, Maronite-born Arab writer, journalist, lexicographer, and linguist who converted to Protestantism, worked with Protestant missionary societies, and participated in the Arabic Bible translation, then converted to Islam.

- Johari Abdul-Malik – First officially recognized Muslim chaplain in higher education in the U.S.
- Tariq Abdul-Wahad – French basketball coach and former player.
- Zaid Abdul-Aziz – American former professional basketball player.
- Ali ibn Sahl Rabban al-Tabari – Persian scholar, physician and psychologist.
- Fakhr al-Din al-Qibti – Egyptian Supervisor of the armies in the Mamluk Sultanate.
- Sanad ibn Ali – Astronomer, translator, mathematician and engineer during Islamic Golden Age.
- Herman Abanda – Cameroonian former footballer who played as a defender.
- Aminah Assilmi – American Former Southern Baptist preacher.
- Khaydhar ibn Kawus al-Afshin – Senior general of Sogdian descent at the court of the Abbasid caliphs.
- Ibn al-Muqaffa' – Persian translator, philosopher, author and thinker who wrote in the Arabic language.
- Tamim al-Dari – Companion of Islamic Prophet Muhammad.
- Ibn Malka al-Baghdadi – Iraqi Philosopher, physician and physicist.
- Al-Samawal al-Maghribi – Mathematician, astronomer and physician.
- Ahmad Faris al-Shidyaq – Ottoman scholar, writer and journalist.
- Muhammad Ali (drummer) – American free jazz drummer.
- Richard Akonnor – Ghanaian-Emirati Professional football player.
- Hamza Ali Abbasi – Former Pakistani actor.
- Azkajwar-Abdallah – The Afrighid king of Khwarazm.
- Abd Al Malik – French rapper and poet.
- Kareem Abdul-Jabbar – American professional basketball player and the NBA's former all-time leading scorer.
- Al-Ru'asi – Scholar of the Arabic language and founder of the Kufan school of Arabic grammar.
- Mahmoud Abdul-Rauf – American former professional basketball player.
- Shakib Arslan – Lebanese writer, poet, historian, politician, and Emir in Lebanon.
- Ahmed Abdullah – American jazz trumpeter.
- Ka'b al-Ahbar – Yemenite Jewish scholar known for transmitting Jewish traditions and biblical lore in Islamic literature.
- Al-Hasan ibn Makhlad al-Jarrah – Senior official of the Abbasid Caliphate.
- Thomas J. Abercrombie – American Photographer and writer for National Geographic.
- Roger Assaf – Lebanese playwright, director and actor.
- Robert of St. Albans – English Templar Knight.
- Ananda – Imperial prince of the Yuan dynasty of China.
- Addas – Christian slave from Nineveh who is traditionally said to have been the first person from Ta'if to embrace Islam.
- Ziya-ur-Rahman Azmi – Indian-born Saudi scholar and Hadith Dean at the Islamic University of Madinah.
- Sulaiman Abdullah – Malaysian lawyer.
- Ma'ruf al-Karkhi – Iraqi Sufi Muslim saint.
- Khosrow Soltan Armani – Safavid official, military commander, and gholam of Armenian origin.
- Hilal al-Sabi' – Arab historian, bureaucrat, and writer of Arabic.
- Musa al-Gharbi – American sociologist.
- The Jacka – American rapper.
- Alexander (son of Ivan Shishman) – Bulgarian prince.
- Rowland Allanson-Winn – Irish peer, writer, and prominent leader of the Woking Muslim Mission; 5th Baron Headley.
- Akhenaton – French rapper and producer.
- Aisha al-Adawiya – American interfaith activist and founder of Women in Islam.
- Shaniera Akram – Australian social worker.
- Anduqapar Amilakhvari – Georgian Amilakhvari noble from Kartli.
- Carolus Andriamatsinoro – Malagasy professional footballer.
- Baba Ali – Iranian-born American film developer, games developer, and businessman.
- Muhammad Ali – American professional boxer, activist, and philanthropist widely regarded as the greatest heavyweight boxer ever.
- Sadeq Ali – Bengali author.
- Nicolas Anelka – French football manager and former player.
- Kecia Ali – American Islamic scholar and professor of religion at Boston University.
- Aghsartan I of Kakheti – King of Kakheti and Hereti.
- Badr al-Jamali – Armenian military commander and statesman for the Fatimid Caliphate under Caliph al-Mustansir.
- Lewis Arquette – American actor who worked in film and television.
- Almış – Ruler of Volga Bulgaria.
- Eric Abidal – French former professional footballer.
- Abd al-Hosayn Ayati – Iranian school teacher.
- Abgar Ali Akbar Armani – Armenian in Safavid Iran who flourished during the reigns of Shah Suleiman I.
- Shah Azahar Abdullah Ahar – Bruneian professional footballer.
- Muhammad Asad – Austro-Hungarian-born Pakistani scholar, best known for his English translation of the Quran.
- Abu'l-Hasan Mihyar al-Daylami – Persian Poet of Daylamite origin during the Buyid period.
- Ivan Aguéli – Swedish wandering Sufi, painter and author.
- Suha Arafat – The widow of former Palestinian National Authority president Yasser Arafat.
- Malik Ambar – Siddi military leader, who served as the Peshwa of the Ahmadnagar Sultanate.
- Campbell Mustafa Ağa – Scottish chief instructor at the Ottoman naval mathematics academy (Hendishâne).
- Claude Alexandre – French officer who served the Ottoman Empire, known as the Count of Bonneval.
- Soliman Pasha al-Faransawi – French officer who fought in the Napoleonic Wars.
- Mouna Ayoub – French socialite and businesswoman of Lebanese origin.
- Edoardo Agnelli – Italian heir, eldest child and only son of Gianni Agnelli, patriarch of Fiat S.p.A.
- Güllü Agop – Ottoman Armenian theatre director as well as an occasional actor.
- Mahmud Pasha Angelović – Grand Vizier of the Ottoman Empire.
- Felix Aboagye – Ghanaian Retired professional footballer.
- Na'ila bint al-Furafisa – The wife of the third caliph Uthman.
- Hamid Algar – British-American Professor Emeritus of Persian Studies at UC Berkeley.
- Mercy Aigbe – Nigerian actress.
- Amina Titi Atiku-Abubakar – Second lady of Nigeria and women and child rights advocate.
- Tatamkhulu Afrika – South African Poet, writer and anti-apartheid activist.
- Abdul-Karim al-Jabbar – American former professional football player.
- Brother Ali – American rapper and member of the Rhymesayers Entertainment hip-hop collective.
- Anna Molka Ahmed – Pakistani artist and a pioneer of fine arts in the country.
- Bankole Awoonor-Renner – Ghanaian politician, journalist, anti-colonialist and Pan-Africanist.

=== B ===
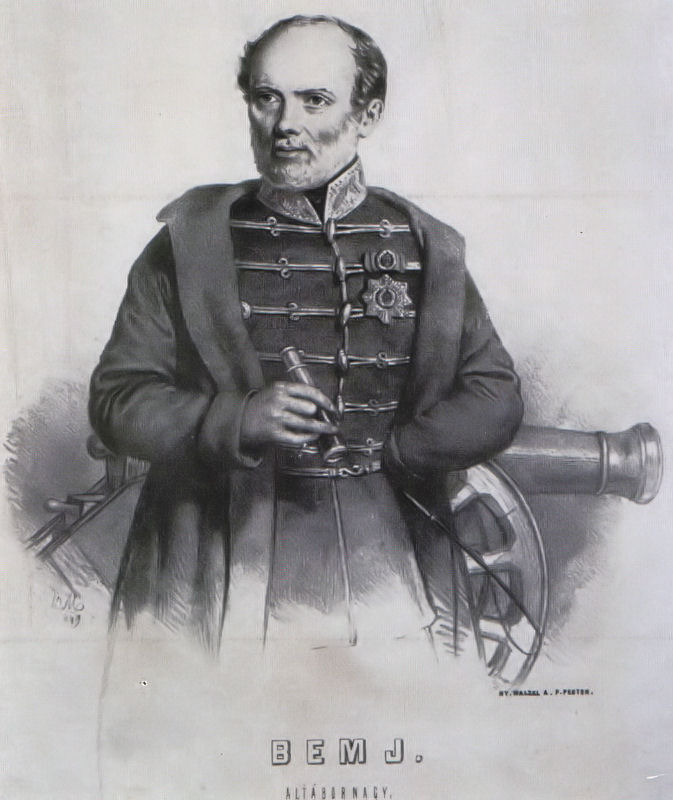
Józef Bem, Polish engineer and general, an Ottoman pasha, a national hero of Poland and Hungary, and a figure intertwined with other European patriotic movements.

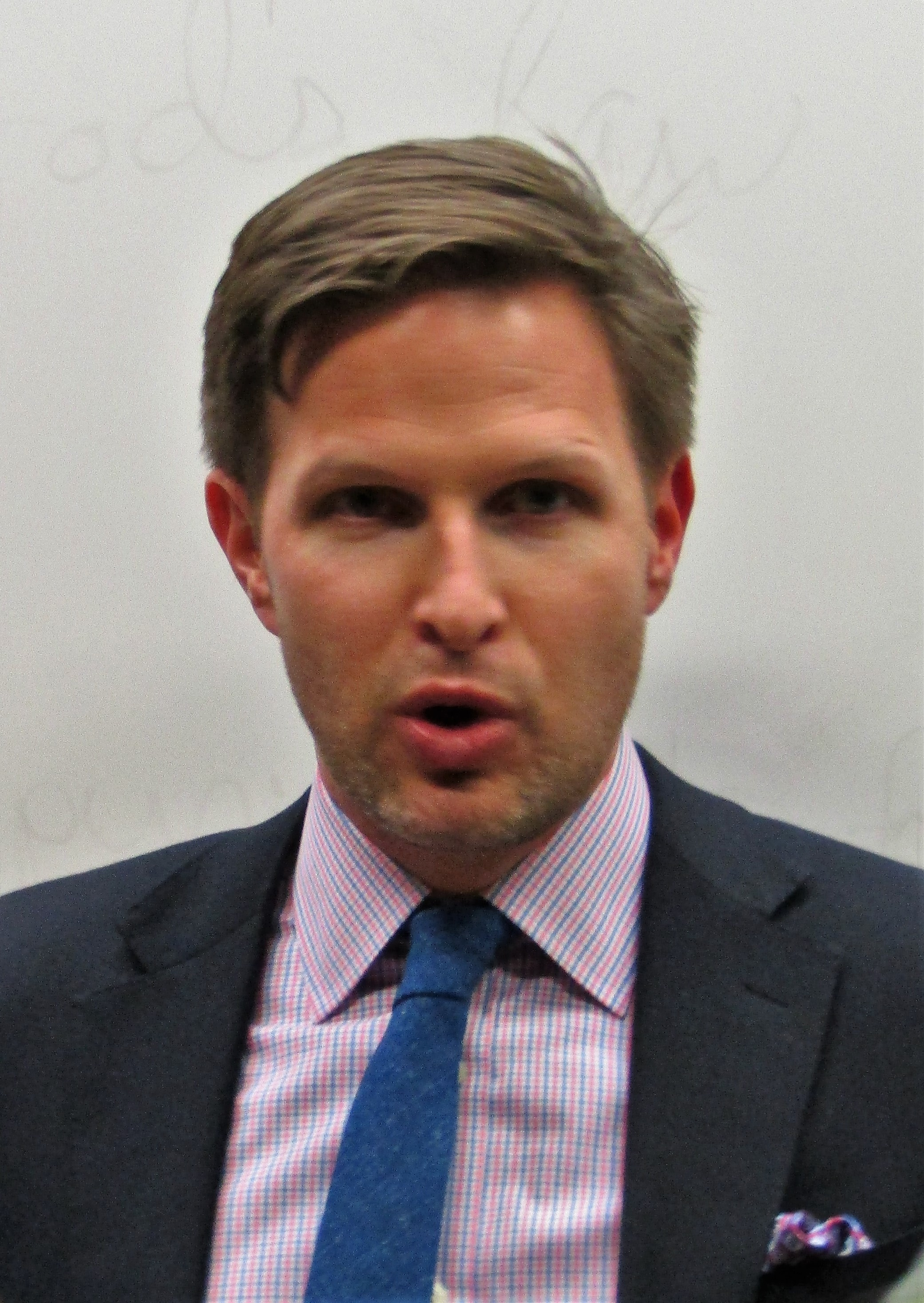
Jonathan A. C. Brown, American scholar of Islamic studies. He has served as a professor at Georgetown University's Edmund A. Walsh School of Foreign Service.

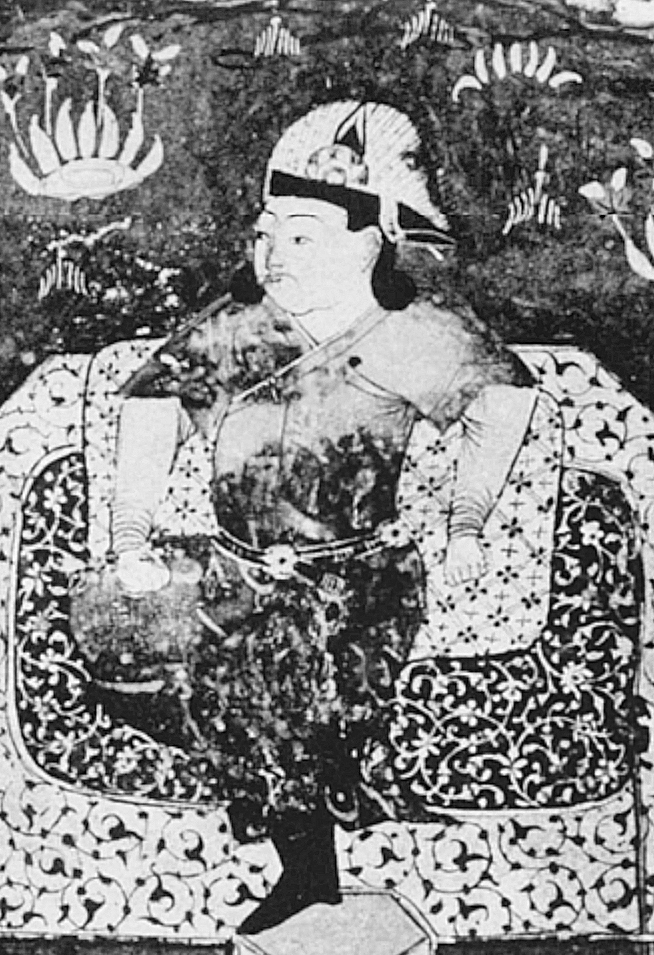
Ghiyas-ud-din Baraq, Mongol ruler of the Chagatai Khanate who converted to Islam and played a role in the early Islamization of the Chagatai realm in Central Asia.

- Ghiyas-ud-din Baraq – The Khan of the Chagatai Khanate.
- Khalid ibn Barmak – Bactrian-born Abbasid official from a family of Buddhist religious leaders in Balkh.
- Caitlyn Bobb – Bermudan sprinter who primarily competes over 400 metres, in which she is the national record holder.
- Ali Bitchin – Italian-born Algerian corsair and admiral.
- Eugénie Le Brun – French-born early Egyptian feminist intellectual, influential salon host.
- Józef Bem – Polish engineer and general, an Ottoman pasha.
- Rae Lil Black – Japanese former adult film star.
- Kristiane Backer – German television presenter.
- A. George Baker – American Protestant clergyman who converted to Islam.
- Yasin Abu Bakr – Trinidadian Islamic leader and former police officer who founded and led Jamaat al-Muslimeen.
- Mutah Beale – American former rapper of Tupac's rap group Outlawz.
- Lutfunnisa Begum – Bengali noblewoman and wife of the last independent Nawab of Bengal.
- Maurice Béjart – French choreographer.
- Robert "Kool" Bell – American musician.
- Ibrahim Bey – Egyptian Mamluk chieftain and regent of Egypt.
- Danny Blum – German professional footballer.
- Mohammed Knut Bernström – Swedish ambassador.
- Lauren Booth – British broadcaster, journalist and human rights activist.
- Burna Boy – Nigerian singer, songwriter, and record producer.
- Surianshah of Banjar – Founder of Kingdom of Banjar and first sultan of the Sultanate of Banjar.
- Pietrangelo Buttafuoco – Italian rightwing journalist and a public intellectual.
- Charles Brooks, Jr. – First person executed by lethal injection in the United States, who converted to Islam in prison.
- H. Rap Brown – American civil rights activist.
- Bahmanyar – Iranian scholar and a pupil of Avicenna.
- Davy van den Berg – Dutch professional footballer.
- Patrice Beaumelle – French football coach and former player.
- Kabir Bello – Nigerian former professional footballer.
- Siyavosh Beg – Safavid military commander, official and gholam of Georgian origin.
- Jason Banton – English professional footballer.
- Christian Bonaud – French Islamologist, philosopher, writer and translator.
- Ali Bongo – Gabonese former politician and dictator who was the third president of Gabon.
- Omar Bongo – The second president of Gabon.
- Ronald Bell – American composer, singer, songwriter, arranger, producer, saxophonist and co-founding member of Kool & the Gang.
- Ezell rican Jr. – American civil rights activist who is best known as a member of the Greensboro Four.
- Johann Ludwig Burckhardt – Swiss traveller, geographer, and Orientalist.
- Jonathan A. C. Brown – American Islamic scholar and Georgetown professor and chair.
- Titus Burckhardt – Swiss writer and scholar.
- Yasiin Bey – American rapper, singer, and actor.
- Abdullah Beg of Kartli – Georgian royal prince (batonishvili) of the House of Mukhrani of the Bagrationi dynasty.
- Berke – Golden Horde ruler and grandson of Genghis Khan who established Islam as its official religion.
- Jean-Alain Boumsong – French former professional footballer.
- Khalid Yahya Blankinship – American historian who specializes in Islamic and middle eastern studies.
- Harun el-Raschid Bey – German officer and SS Standartenführer.
- Aisha Abdurrahman Bewley – American Author and translator of many classical Islamic books.
- Carla Amina Baghajati – Austrian media officer of the Islamic Faith Association in Austria.
- Jaylen Brown – American professional basketball player.
- Badhan – Sasanian governor of Yemen during the reign of Khosrow II.
- Arief Budiman – Chinese Indonesian social activist and brother of Soe Hok Gie.
- Robert Bauer – German professional footballer.
- M. A. R. Barker – American linguist and Urdu professor who created the role-playing game Empire of the Petal Throne.
- Mahesh Bhatt – Indian film producer.

=== C ===
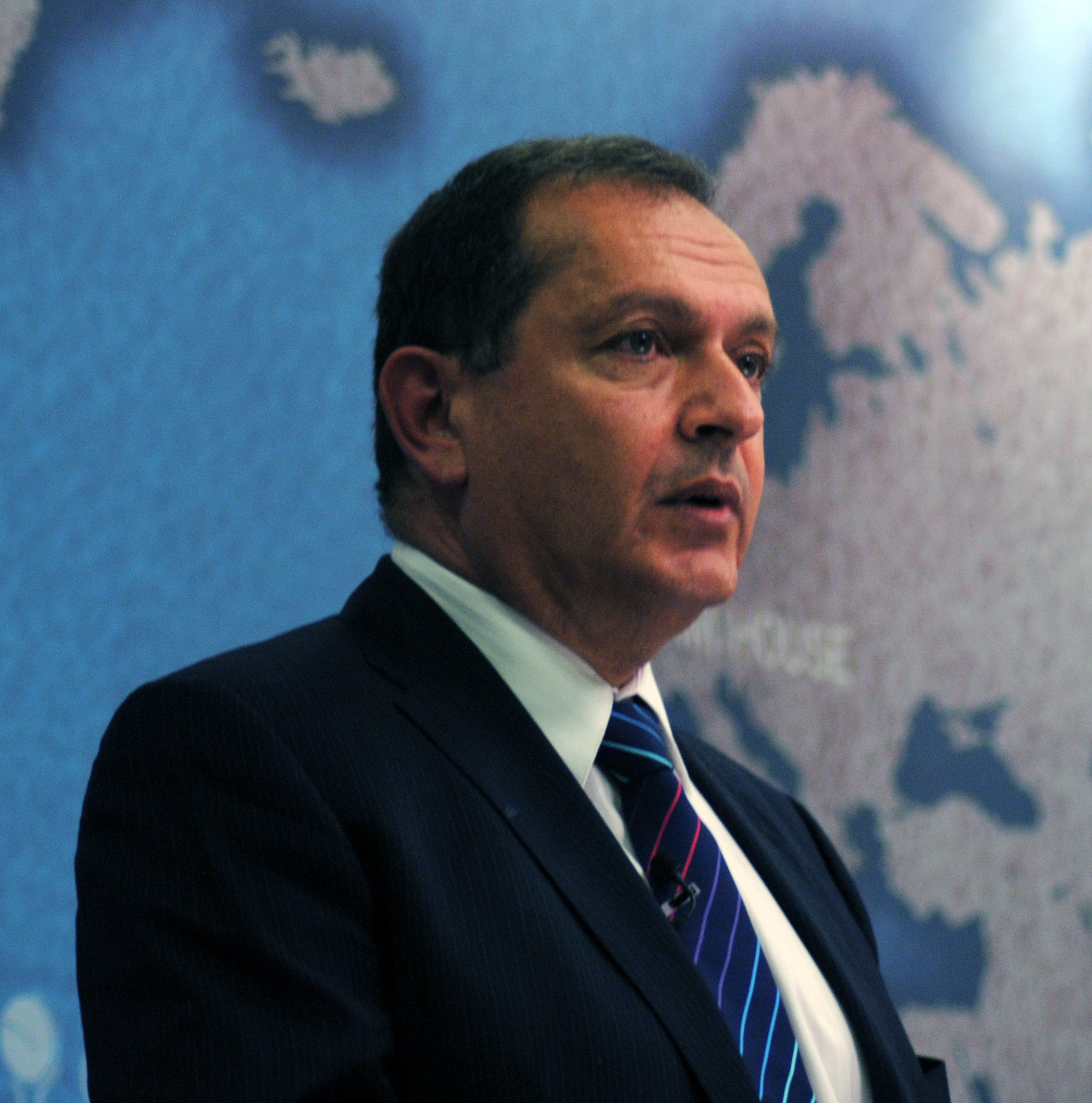
Simon Collis, former British ambassador to several Middle Eastern countries.

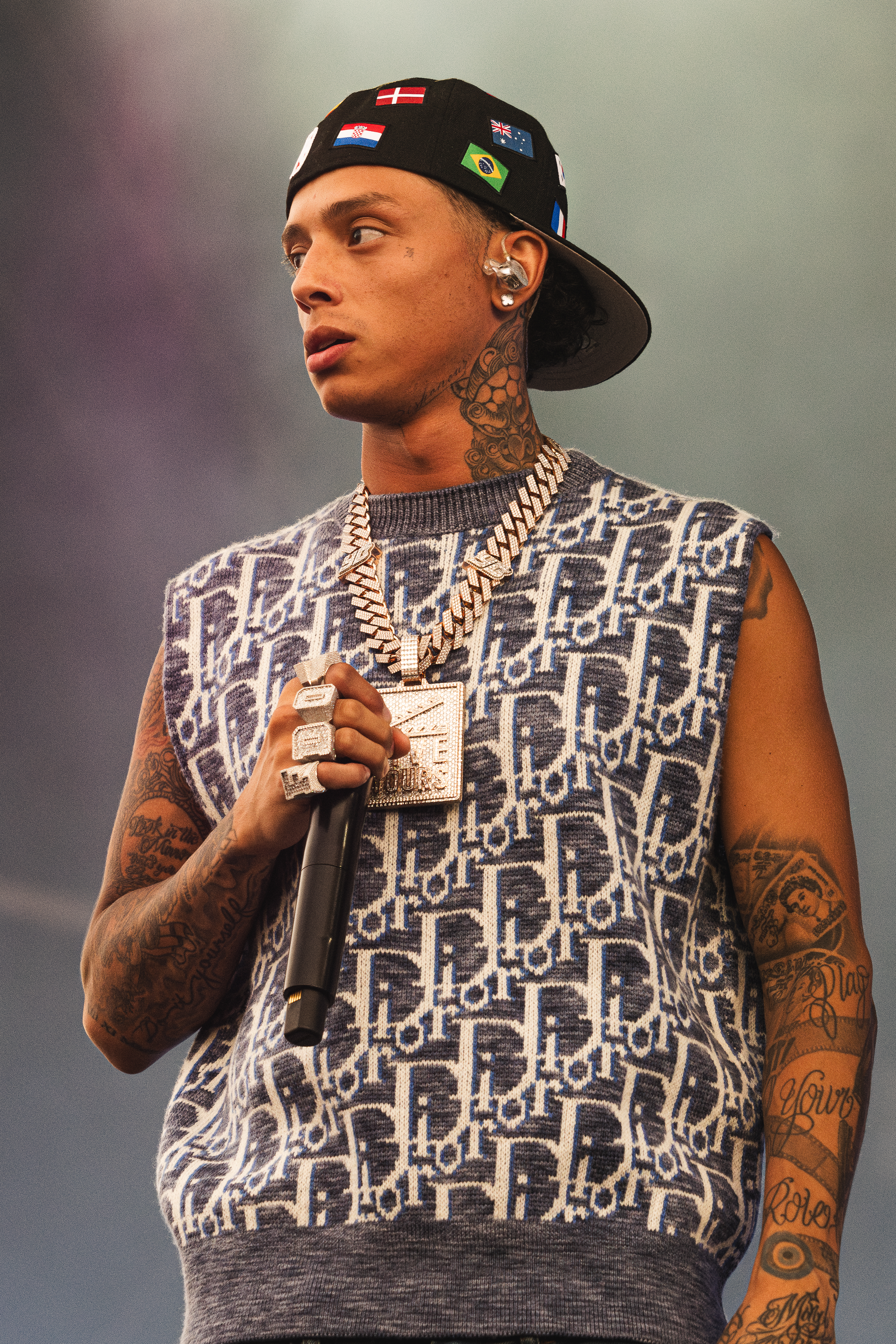
Central Cee, British rapper. Regarded as a leading figure in UK rap.

- Catherine of Bosnia – Member of the House of Kotromanić and the last Bosnian princess.
- Celestino Caballero – Panamanian boxer and former Super Bantamweight Champion.
- Central Cee – British rapper and songwriter known for UK rap and drill music.
- Dave Chappelle – American comedian, screenwriter, television/film producer, actor, and artist.
- Kérim Chatty – Swedish bodybuilding stuntman.
- Ashley Chin – British actor and rapper.
- Michel Chodkiewicz – French scholar of Sufism.
- Lady Evelyn Cobbold – Scottish diarist, traveller and noblewoman.
- Louis du Couret – French explorer, writer and military officer.
- Farida El Choubachy – Member of the Parliament of Egypt, journalist and political writer.
- Robert Dickson Crane – American scholar, author, and former foreign policy adviser to President Richard Nixon.
- Simon Collis – Former British ambassador to several Middle Eastern countries.
- Fábio Carvalho – Brazilian-Portuguese professional footballer.
- Richard Chin – English-born Malaysian professional footballer.
- Deddy Corbuzier – Indonesian television presenter, actor, YouTuber, and former mentalist.
- Vincent Cornell – American scholar of Islam at Emory University.
- Iliaș Colceag – Moldavian mercenary and military commander in the Ottoman and Russian Empire.
- Susan Carland – Australian academic, author and television presenter.
- Jono Carroll – Irish professional boxer.
- Cadet – British rapper.
- Wande Coal – Nigerian singer and songwriter.
- Constantine I of Kakheti – king (mepe) of Kakheti in eastern Georgia.
- Héctor Camacho Jr. – American-born Puerto Rican and Mexican professional boxer.
- Fergie Chambers – American communist political activist and heir in the Cox family.
- Darializa Avila Chevalier – American politician and community organizer.
- Kenny Clarke – American jazz drummer and bandleader.
- Skender Bey Crnojević – Serbian nobleman from the Crnojević noble family, which ruled the Lordship of Zeta, and the heir to Ivan I Crnojević.
- Zhang Chengzhi – Chinese Hui writer and author of History of the Soul, a novel about the Jahriyya Sufi order.
- Bruce Conde – American Army officer, stamp collector, and Royalist general in the North Yemen Civil War.
- Darren Cheesman – Former England and Great Britain international field hockey player.
- Logan Costa – French-Cape Verdean Professional football player.
- Nishikanta Chattopadhyay – Bengali scholar and the first Bengali to earn a PhD from a European University.
- Torquato Cardilli – Italian diplomat.
- Fatima Cates – British activist, who co-founded the Liverpool Muslim Institute.

=== D ===
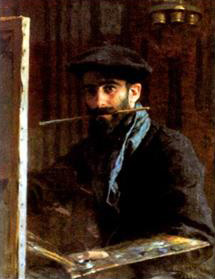
Nasreddine Dinet, French orientalist painter and one of the founders of the Société des Peintres Orientalistes (Society for French Orientalist Painters).

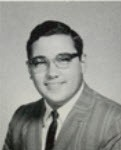
Michael D'Andrea, retired Central Intelligence Agency officer who played an instrumental role in American counterterrorism efforts during the war on terror.

- Michael D'Andrea – American former CIA officer and counterterrorism center director.
- Periyar Dasan – Indian professor, scholar, psychologist, activist, and award-winning Tamil actor.
- Maria Massi Dakake – American Islamic studies scholar and associate professor at George Mason University.
- Yasin Dutton – British Islamic studies scholar and emeritus Arabic professor at the University of Cape Town.
- Aliya Danzeisen – American-New Zealand lawyer, teacher, and Islamic Women's Council national coordinator.
- Merryl Wyn Davies – Welsh scholar, writer and broadcaster who specialised in Islam.
- Dhovemi of the Maldives – Second king of the Maldives.
- Lil Durk – American rapper.
- Gervonta Davis – American professional boxer.
- Uri Davis – Israeli-British Middle East scholar and civil rights activist.
- Jeffrey Mark Deskovic – American attorney.
- Diam's – French rapper.
- Nasreddine Dinet – French orientalist painter.
- Youssef Darwish – Egyptian labour lawyer, communist and activist.
- Budi Djiwandono – Indonesian politician and Gerindra Party faction chairman.
- Joshua Dolezal – American academic and writer.
- Roger Danuarta – Indonesian soap opera actor.
- Arnoud van Doorn – Dutch politician. He was a member of the Dutch Freedom Party (PVV).
- Vivian Dsena – Indian television actor.
- David XI – King of Kartli.
- Andronikos Doukas – Byzantine general and rebel in the reign of Emperor Leo VI the Wise.
- Didier Domi – French football coach, former professional footballer.
- Nooruddeen Durkee – American scholar, translator, and North American khalifah of the Shadhdhuli order.
- Dutchavelli – British rapper.
- Yaroslav Dyblenko – Russian professional ice hockey defenceman.
- John Drysdale – British-born army officer, diplomat, writer, historian, and businessman.

=== E ===
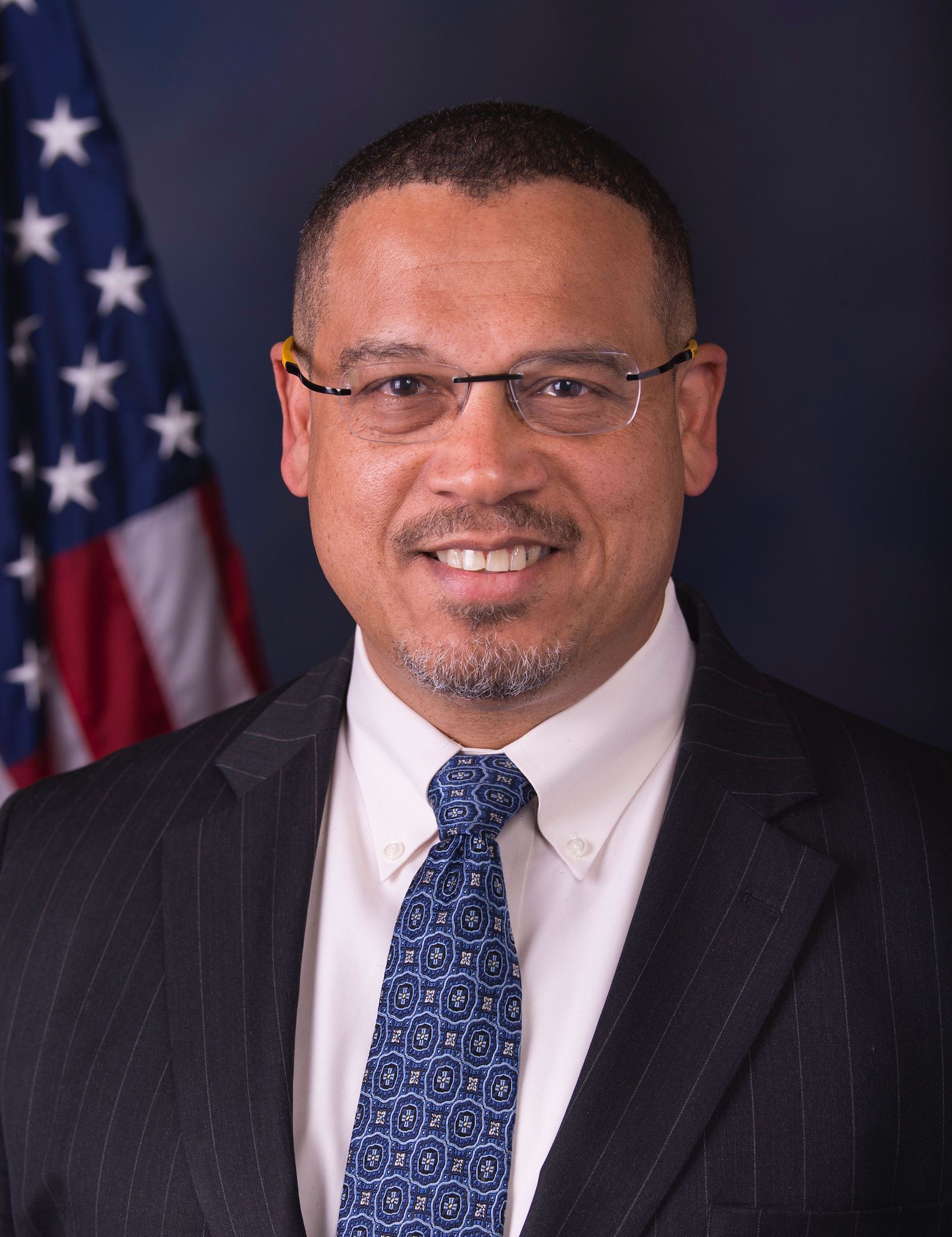
Keith Ellison, American politician and lawyer serving as the 30th attorney general of Minnesota since 2019.

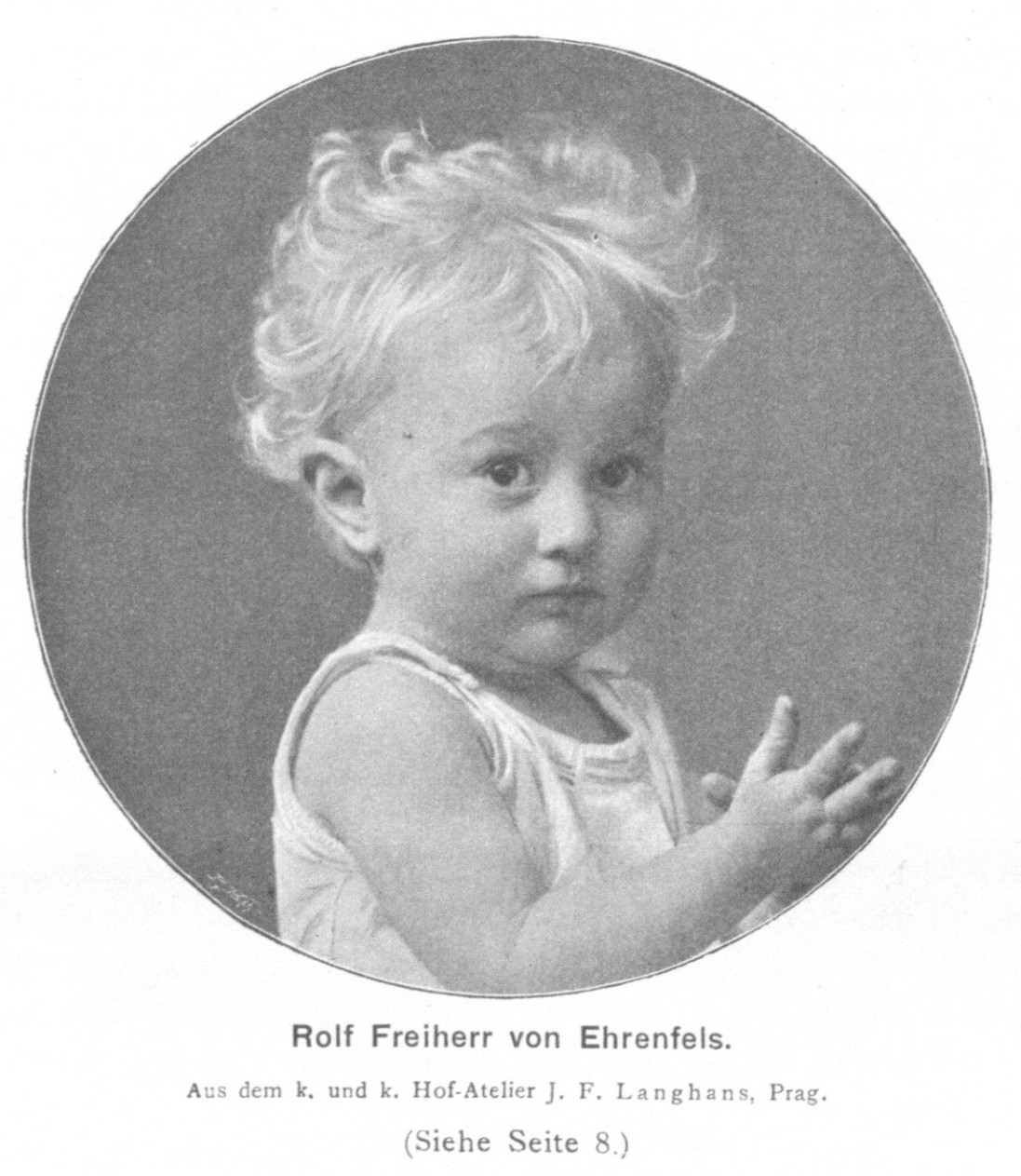
Umar Rolf von Ehrenfels, Austrian anthropologist who headed the Department of Anthropology at the University of Madras.

- Gai Eaton – British diplomat, writer, historian, and an Islamic scholar.
- Dave East – American rapper and actor.
- Isabelle Eberhardt – Swiss explorer and writer.
- Keith Ellison – American politician and lawyer, the first Muslim elected to Congress, representing Minnesota.
- Giancarlo Esposito – American actor.
- Everlast – American rapper and singer-songwriter.
- Evrenos – Ottoman military commander and frontier lord during the expansion into the Balkans.
- Abdullah el-Faisal – Jamaican Muslim cleric.
- Isaac ibn Ezra – Scholar, poet, and philosopher from Al-Andalus.
- Eldo – Polish rapper, lyricist and radio journalist.
- Yusuf Estes – American preacher and founder of Guide US TV.
- Umar Rolf von Ehrenfels – Austrian anthropologist.
- George Bethune English – American adventurer, diplomat and soldier.
- Nathan Ellington – English retired professional footballer.
- Emeka Ezeugo – Nigerian former professional footballer.

=== F ===
- Saliha Marie Fetteh – Danish author, debater, lecturer and former imam.
- Vilayil Faseela – Indian Mappila songs singer.
- Tali Fahima – Israeli pro-Palestinian activist.
- Robert Frager – American social psychologist who founded the first U.S. institution for transpersonal psychology.
- José Faria – Brazilian football coach.
- Alys Faiz – Pakistani poet, writer, journalist, human rights activist, social worker and a teacher.
- Shems Friedlander – American professor, Sufi master, visual artist, filmmaker, and author.
- Firouz – Armenian armor maker who held a high post in Yaghi-Siyan's Seljuk Turkish government.
- Daoud Ahmed Faisal – Grenadian-born American Sunni Muslim missionary and leader in the United States.
- Amanda Figueras – Spanish journalist for El Mundo and a writer.
- Ricardo Faty – Former French professional footballer.
- Jaime Fletcher – American film maker and founder of IslamInSpanish.
- Myriam François – English-French writer and broadcaster.
- Sultaana Freeman – American woman known for a legal dispute over her veiled driver's license photo.
- Blake Ferguson – Australian former professional rugby league footballer.
- Julien Faubert – French former professional footballer.
- Bjorn Fortuin – South African professional cricketer.
- Maksim Fedin – Kazakhstani professional footballer.
- Zilla Fatu – American professional wrestler.

=== G ===
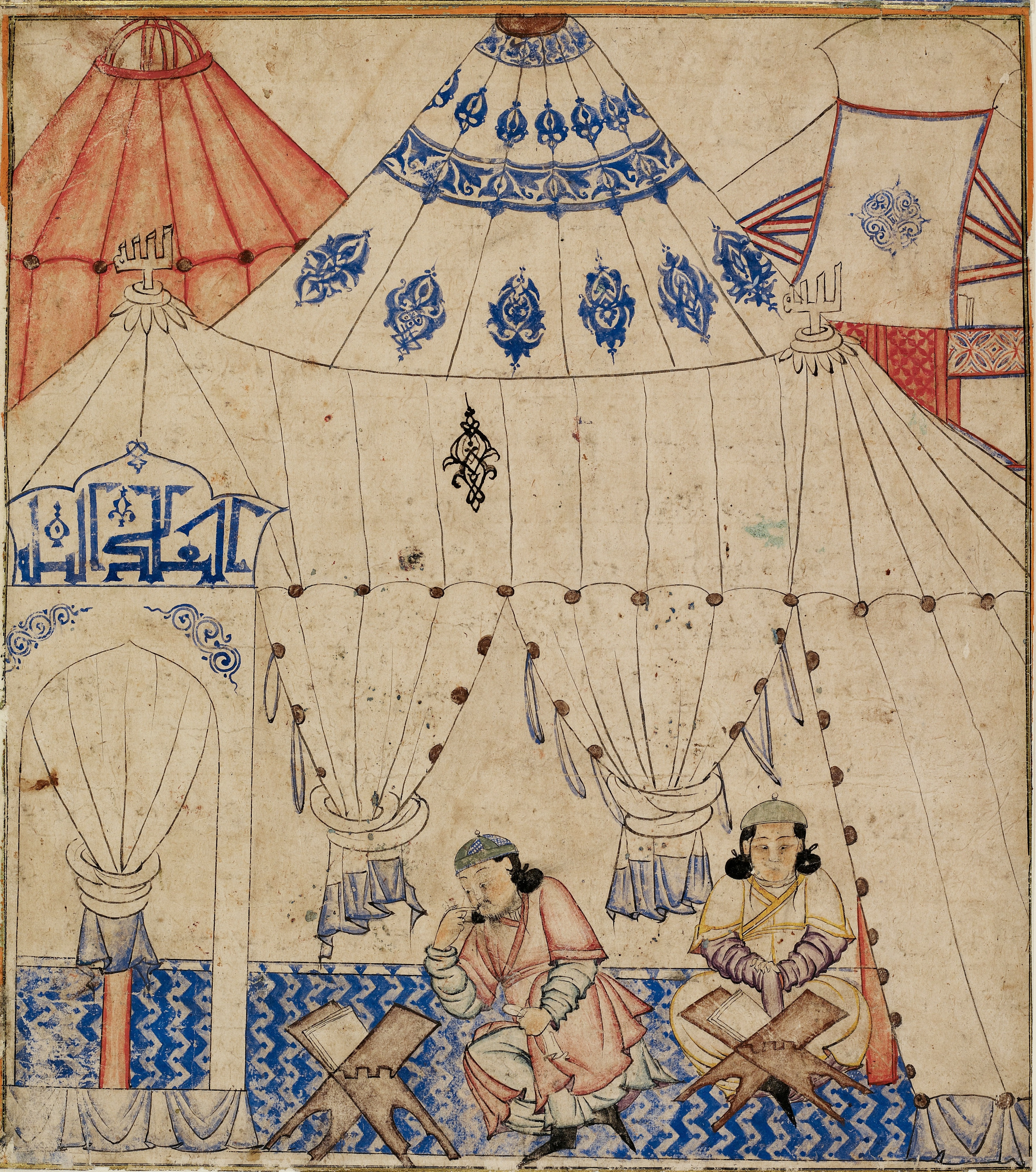
Ghazan, Mongol ruler of the Ilkhanate, monarch, and military leader who played a major role in the political and cultural transformation of medieval Iran.

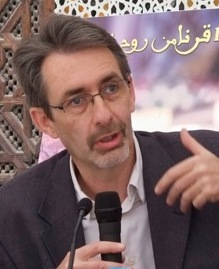
Eric Geoffroy, French philosopher, islamologist, writer and scholar in the Sufi studies teaching at the University of Strasbourg.

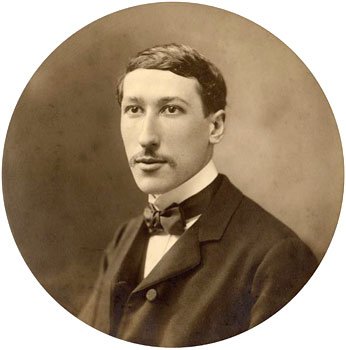
René Guénon, French philosopher, metaphysician, and spiritual thinker whose writings explored traditional wisdom, Sufism, and the spiritual traditions of East and West.

- Roger Garaudy – French philosopher, French resistance fighter and a communist author.
- Ghazan – The seventh ruler of the Ilkhanate.
- Gyula Germanus – Hungarian writer, Islamologist, and professor of Oriental studies.
- Leopold Gleim – German SS officer.
- Faris Glubb – British writer, journalist, translator and publisher.
- Jemima Goldsmith – British socialite and ex-wife of Imran Khan.
- Juan Carlos Gomez – Cuban former Cruiserweight Boxing Champion.
- Khalid Gonçalves – Portuguese American actor and musician.
- Gary Goodridge – Trinidadian-Canadian former heavyweight kickboxer and mixed martial artist.
- Gorilla Nems – American rapper, content creator, entrepreneur and web series' host.
- Sohrab Khan Gorji – Courtier, treasurer, and chief of customs in 19th-century Qajar Iran.
- Parsadan Gorgijanidze – Georgian factotum and historian in the service of the Safavids.
- Éric Geoffroy – French philosopher, Islamologist, writer, and Sufi studies scholar at the University of Strasbourg.
- Lewis Grabban – English former professional footballer.
- K. L. Gauba – Indian lawyer and politician.
- Manuchehr Khan Gorji – Armenian governor of Isfahan, Qajar Iran.
- Royce Gracie – Brazilian retired professional mixed martial artist.
- Cristian Gonzáles – Indonesian former professional footballer.
- Abdur Raheem Green – British Islamic preacher and founder of iERA.
- Charles Greenlee – American jazz trombonist who worked extensively with Archie Shepp.
- Fatima Grimm – German translator, author and speaker on the subject of Islam.
- Khosrow Khan Gorji – Armenian eunuch and influential figure in Qajar Iran.
- Kevin Gates – American rapper, singer, and songwriter.
- Niccolò Gattilusio – The sixth and last Gattilusio lord of Lesbos.
- Jules Gervais-Courtellemont – French photographer who was famous for taking color autochromes during World War I.
- Jadel Gregório – Brazilian long and triple jumper holding South American and Brazilian records.
- Philippe Grenier – French doctor and the first Muslim member of the French Parliament in history.
- Gigi Gryce – American saxophonist, flutist, clarinetist, composer, arranger, and educator.
- Gopi Rizqi – Malaysian footballer.
- Gims – Congolese singer and rapper.
- René Guénon – French philosopher, metaphysician, and writer; a leading figure in the Traditionalist School.
- Bruno Guiderdoni – French astrophysicist and research director at the CNRS.

=== H ===
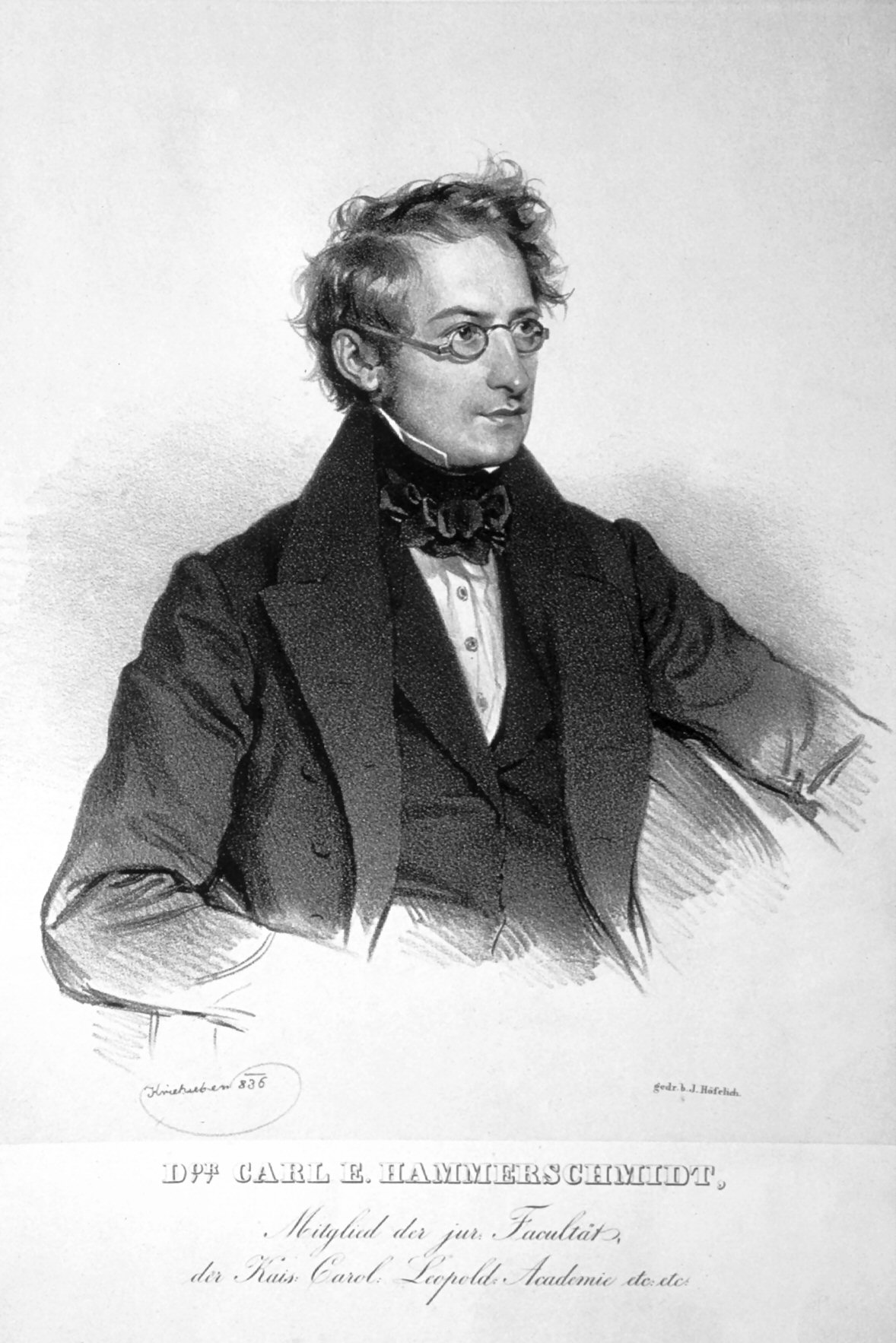
Carl Eduard Hammerschmidt, Austrian mineralogist, entomologist and medical doctor.

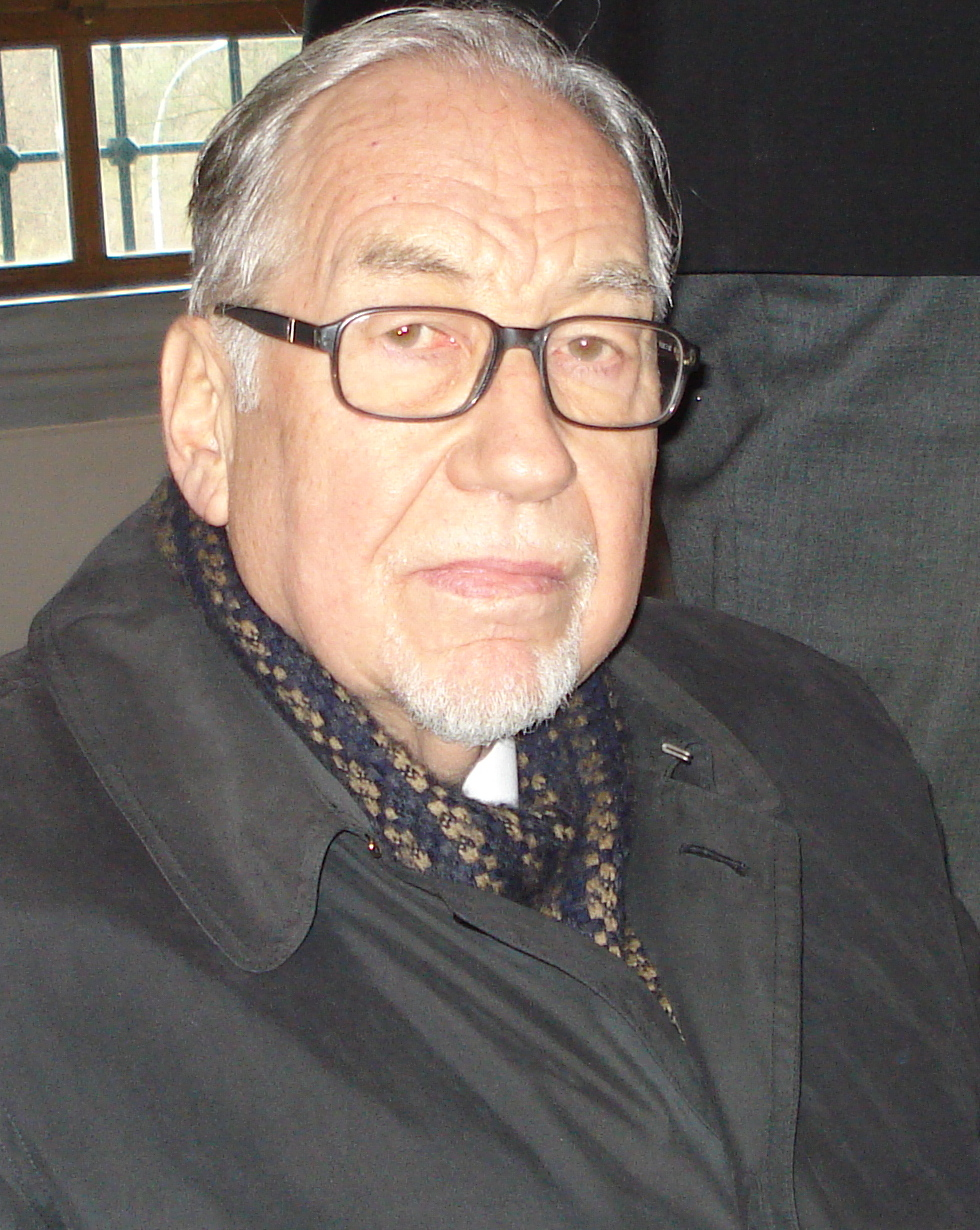
Murad Wilfried Hofmann, German diplomat and author known for his writings on Islam, Islamic civilization, and interfaith dialogue.

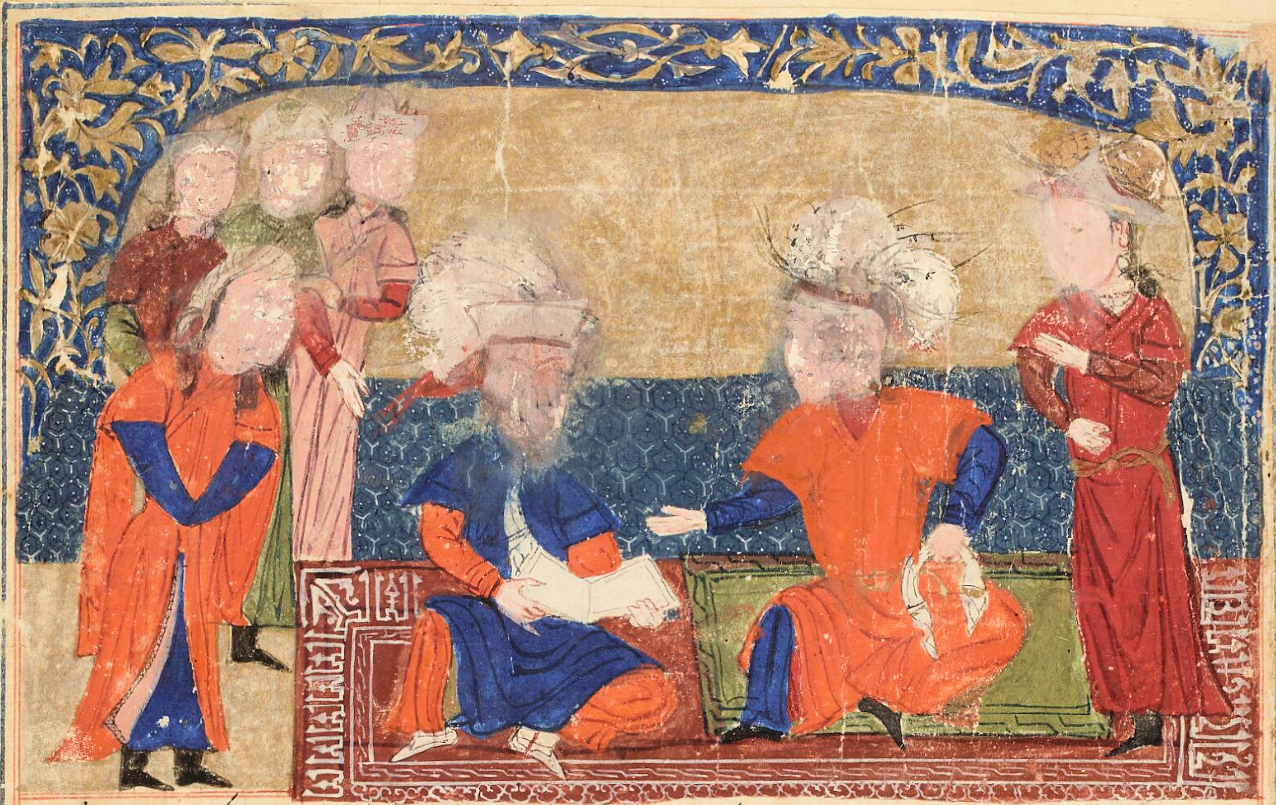
Rashid al-Din Hamadani, Persian statesman, historian, and physician who served as vizier of the Ilkhanate and established the Rabʿ-e Rashidi academic and charitable foundation in Tabriz.

- Javidan Hanim – Hungarian noblewoman and the second wife of Abbas II of Egypt.
- Carl Eduard Hammerschmidt – Austrian mineralogist, entomologist, and physician.
- Guillaume Hawing – Guinean teacher, inventor, and politician.
- Armand Hussein – American professional wrestler.
- Abu al-Fadl ibn Hasdai – Andalusian philosopher, poet, mathematician, physician, and politician.
- John Darwin Hinds – Welsh politician, Wales’ first Black and Muslim councillor and first Black mayor.
- Balozi Harvey – American activist, community organizer, diplomat, and public official.
- Sir Archibald Hamilton – British aristocrat, 5th and 3rd Baronet.
- Kentarō Hiki – Japanese samurai, baron, businessman, and educator who lived from the late Edo period to the Taishō era.
- Ubayd Haider – Fijian professional boxer.
- Terry Holdbrooks – American soldier who worked as a guard at Guantanamo Bay detention camp.
- Gibril Haddad – Lebanese-born Islamic scholar, hadith expert, author, and translator of classical Islamic texts.
- Joel Hayward – New Zealand-born British scholar of Islam.
- Adi ibn Hatim – The leader of the Arab tribe of Tayy, and one of the companions of Muhammad. He was the son of the poet Hatim al-Tai.
- Walt Hazzard (Islamic name Mahdi Abdul-Rahman) – Former NBA player and college basketball coach.
- Safiyya bint Huyayy – Muhammad's tenth wife.
- Devin Haney – American professional boxer. He is the youngest boxer in history to hold an undisputed championship.
- Joe Tex – American singer and musician.
- Heraclius I of Kakheti – Georgian monarch (mepe) who reigned as King of Kartli and Kakheti.
- Aribert Heim – Austrian SS doctor, also known as Dr. Death.
- Buraq Hajib – Khitan ruler who founded the Qutlugh-Khanid dynasty in Kirman, Persia.
- Murad Wilfried Hofmann – German diplomat and author.
- Tony Hussein Hinde – Australian-born Maldivian surfer and surfing pioneer.
- Baba Ratan Hindi – Indian merchant.
- Rabih Haddad – Executive Director of the Global Anti-Aggression Campaign (GAAC). He also co-founded the Global Relief Foundation (GRF), an Illinois-based charity.
- Nilüfer Hatun – Consort of Orhan, the second Ottoman sultan, and the mother of Murad I, Orhan's successor.
- Tan Tong Hye – Singapore-born journalist and politician, and founding Secretary-General of the Alliance Party.
- Lim Yew Hock – Singapore's second Chief Minister.
- Knud Holmboe – Danish journalist, author and explorer.
- Ahmed Huber – Swiss-German journalist.
- István Horthy Jr. – Hungarian physicist and architect.
- Bernard Hopkins – American former professional boxer.
- Ibrahim Hewitt – British writer journalist and chairman.
- Peter Hellyer – British-Emirati film-maker, journalist, historian and archaeologist.
- Ryan Harris – American former professional football player.
- Pieter van der Hoog – Dutch bacteriologist, dermatologist, and Islamicist.
- Rashid al-Din Hamadani – Persian Statesman, historian, and physician in Ilkhanate Iran.

=== I ===
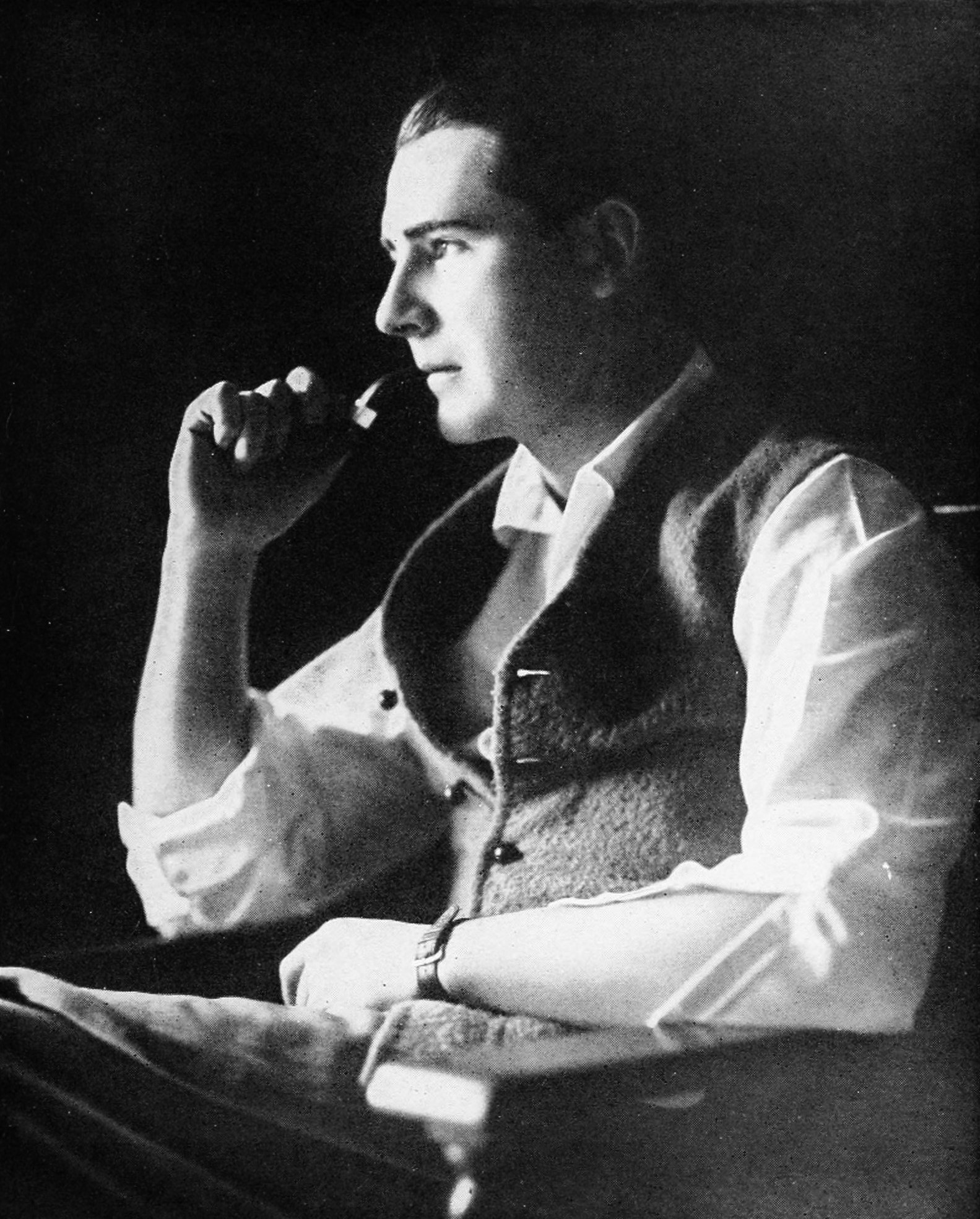
Rex Ingram, Irish film director, producer, writer, and actor, who was called "the world's greatest director" in his time.

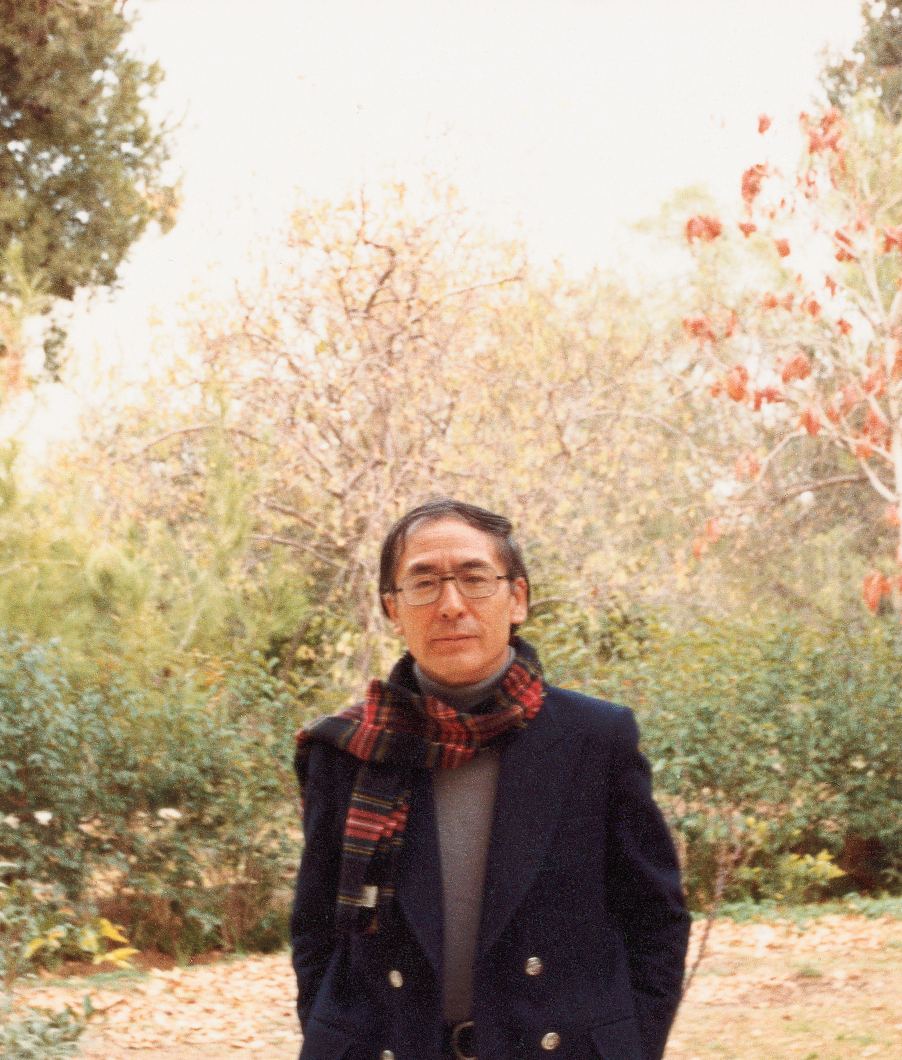
Masatoshi Gündüz Ikeda, Japanese-born Turkish mathematician known for his contributions to the field of algebraic number theory.

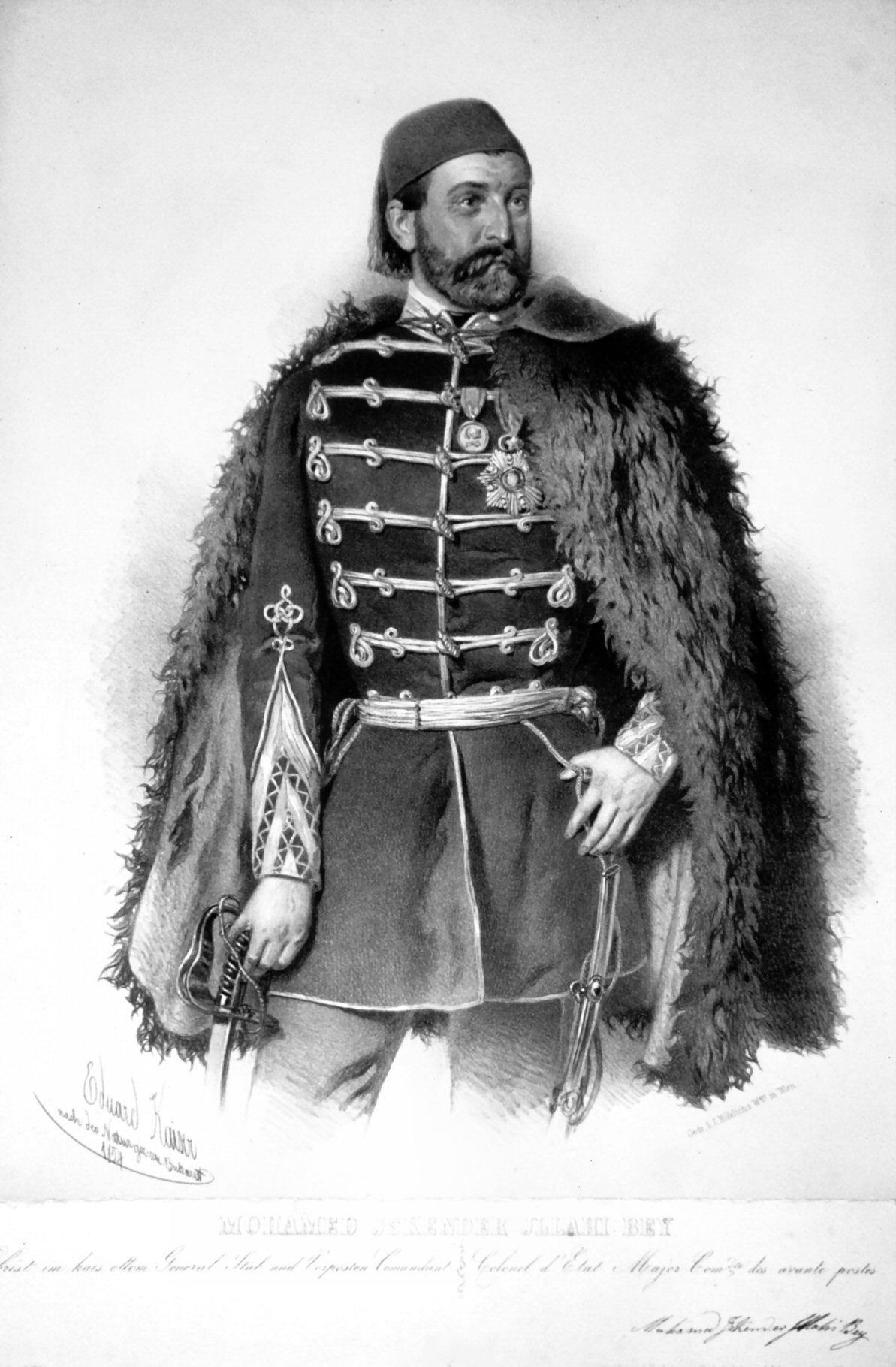
Antoni Aleksander Iliński, Polish-born Ottoman military officer and general who served in the Ottoman Army during the Crimean War and held senior military commands in several Ottoman territories.

- Abdullah Ibrahim – South African jazz musician.
- Rex Ingram – Irish film director, producer, writer, and actor.
- Rebeka Ibrahima – Latvian-born Qatari weightlifter, two-time Junior World Champion and two-time European Champion.
- Masatoshi Gündüz Ikeda – Japanese-born Turkish mathematician known for his contributions to the field of algebraic number theory.
- Silma Ihram – Australian educator, author, and racial tolerance campaigner.
- Kyrie Irving – American professional basketball player.
- Antoni Aleksander Iliński – Polish-Ottoman military officer, general, and Polish independence activist.
- Ahmed el Inglizi – English renegade architect and engineer.
- Dunja Ilić – Serbian singer-songwriter and author.
- Nora Ivanova – Austrian sprinter.
- Negma Ibrahim – Egyptian actress.
- Nora Illi – Swiss Islamic preacher. She was chairwoman of the Islamic Central Council of Switzerland (ICCS).
- Monty Ioane – Australian-born Italian professional rugby union player.
- Robert Irwin – British scholar and novelist.
- T. B. Irving – Canadian-American Author, professor, activist and scholar who produced the first American English translation of the Qur'an.

=== J ===
- Jermaine Jackson – American singer, songwriter of Jackson Family. He is the elder brother of popstar Michael Jackson.
- Fatimah Jackson – American biologist and anthropologist at Howard University.
- Stephen Jackson – American former professional basketball player.
- Sarah Joseph – British journalist, commentator, and former CEO and editor of Emel magazine.
- Tiara Jacquelina – Malaysian actress.
- War Jabi – First Muslim king of Takrur, who established Islam as its state religion.
- Lil Jon – American rapper and record producer.
- Rodtang Jitmuangnon – Thai professional Muay Thai fighter and kickboxer.
- Ibn Jazla – Baghdad physician and author of an influential medical treatise on regimen.
- Jota – Spanish former professional footballer.
- Jesse of Kakheti – Ruler of Kakheti, Georgia.
- Yusuf I Jaqeli – Pasha of Childir.
- Shaikh Jamiruddin – Bengali Islamic preacher and writer.
- Abdul Jeelani – American professional basketball player.
- Jai – Indian actor and musician working in Tamil films.
- Beka III Jaqeli – Georgian Pasha of Childir Eyalet.
- Ahmad Jamal – American jazz pianist.
- Manuchar II Jaqeli – Prince of Samtskhe and the pasha of its capital Akhaltsikhe.
- Curtis J. Jones Jr. – American politician and a Democratic member of the Philadelphia City Council.
- Maryam Jameelah – American-Pakistani author of over thirty books on Islamic culture and history and a female voice for orthodox Islam.
- Jan Janszoon – Dutch pirate, later sent his son to America, to become one of the first settlers of modern-day Brooklyn.
- Kery James – French-Haitian rapper, singer, actor, director, and screenwriter.
- Larry Johnson – Retired American professional basketball player.
- Aliqoli Jadid-ol-Eslam – Portuguese Augustinian friar and missionary who served as an official interpreter at the royal court in Isfahan.

=== K ===
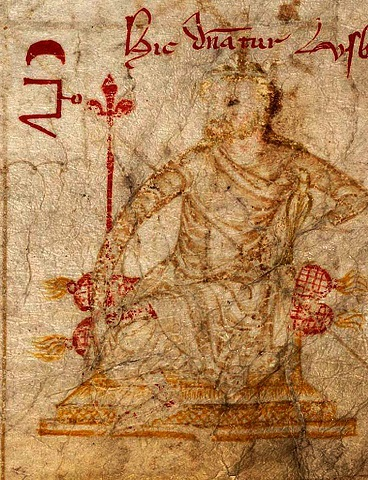
Özbeg Khan, Mongol ruler of the Golden Horde who adopted Islam and helped establish it as the state religion, ushering in a period of political strength and Islamic cultural development.

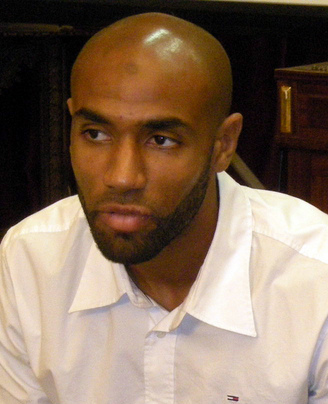
Frédéric Kanouté, Malian former professional footballer who played as a striker. He was named African Footballer of the Year in 2007, becoming the first player born outside Africa to win the award.

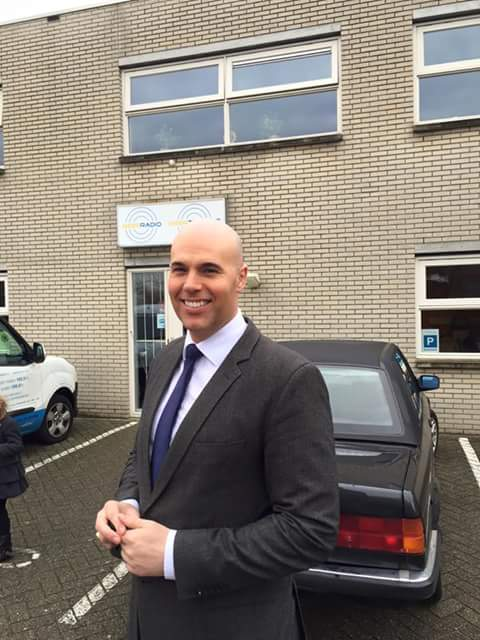
Joram van Klaveren, Dutch right-wing politician and former member of the Party for Freedom (PVV). He was known for his opposition to Islam before converting to it while researching a book intended to refute it.

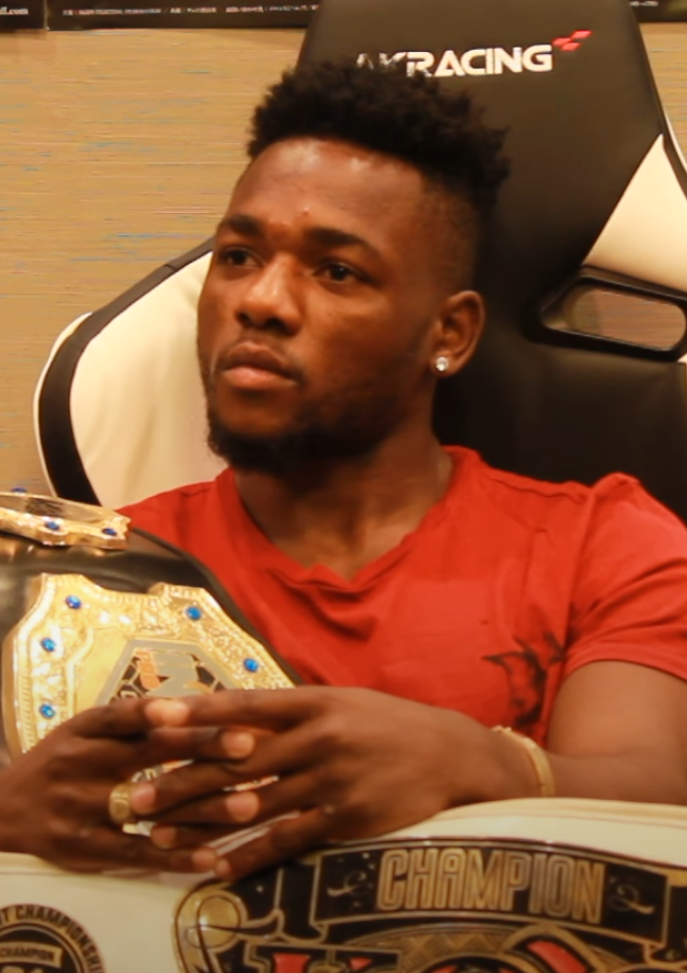
Manel Kape, Angolan-Portuguese professional mixed martial artist. By 2026, he was ranked #1 in the UFC flyweight rankings.

- Kathellen – Brazilian professional female footballer.
- Bilal Abdul Kareem – American journalist and war correspondent.
- Korguz – Uyghur governor of Khurasan during the reign of the Mongol ruler Ögedei Khan.
- Malik Kafur – Military commander of Alauddin Khalji.
- Mfiondu Kabengele – Canadian professional basketball player.
- Kalapahar – Bengali General of the Bengal Sultanate under the reigning Karrani Dynasty.
- Saman Khuda – Iranian Nobleman and the eponymous ancestor of the Samanid dynasty.
- Michael Muhammad Knight – American author and scholar.
- Kawus ibn Kharakhuruh – The ruler of the Principality of Ushrusana during the 9th century.
- Dipika Kakar – Indian television actress.
- Nogai Khan – Mongol General and kingmaker of the Golden Horde. His great-grandfather was Jochi, son of Genghis Khan.
- Tresor Kangambu – Qatari professional footballer.
- Allahverdi Khan – Georgian-born Safavid general and statesman.
- Ya'qub ibn Killis – Egyptian Vizier under the Fatimids from 979 to 991.
- David Benjamin Keldani – Former Catholic bishop of Urmia and author of Muhammad in the Bible.
- Frédéric Kanouté – French Malian former football player.
- Ali Mohammed Khan – Founder of the Kingdom of Rohilkhand.
- Peter Kassig – American humanitarian aid worker killed by ISIS.
- Joram van Klaveren – Dutch politician.
- Salwa Aga Khan – American former fashion model.
- Larry Kenon – American former professional basketball player.
- Khalid Kelly – Former leader of Al-Muhajiroun in Ireland.
- Özbeg Khan – Khan of the Golden Horde from 1313 to 1341.
- Saida Miller Khalifa – British author, originally named Sonya Miller.
- Khusrau Khan – The sixteenth Sultan of Delhi for around two months in 1320.
- Om Habibeh Aga Khan – French beauty queen, Miss France 1930, and wife of Aga Khan III.
- Malik Jahan Khan – Indian military officer and adventurer active.
- Murshid Quli Khan – First Nawab of Bengal.
- John Tzelepes Komnenos – Byzantine prince who defected to the Seljuks.
- Sultan Satuq Bughra Khan – One of the first Turkic rulers to convert to Islam.
- Abd al Haqq Kielan – Swedish cleric.
- Presnel Kimpembe – French professional footballer.
- Ishak Bey Kraloğlu – Bosnian prince and the last known member of the House of Kotromanić.
- Mustapha Khaznadar – Greek-born Tunisian politician and reformer.
- Armando Bukele Kattán – Palestinian-Salvadoran chemist, entrepreneur, and Islamic religious leader; father of Nayib Bukele.
- Jamilah Kolocotronis – American writer of Greek origin and former educator in American Islamic schools.
- Shaun King – American Black Lives Matter activist.
- Ghostface Killah – American rapper and a member of the hip-hop group Wu-Tang Clan.
- James Achilles Kirkpatrick – British Resident in Hyderabad.
- Kollegah – German rapper.
- Thomas Keith – Scottish military officer in the Ottoman army and governor of Medina.
- Halima Krausen – German Muslim leader, theologian and scholar.
- Nuh Ha Mim Keller – American Islamic scholar, teacher and author, studied philosophy and Arabic at the University of Chicago and the UCLA.
- Kōhan Kawauchi – Japanese screenwriter who created various tokusatsu series.
- Yuri Kochiyama – American civil rights activist.
- Manel Kape – Angolan-born Portuguese professional mixed martial artist.
- Fred Kerley – American track and field sprinter.
- Henry John Klassen – American physician-scientist in the field of regenerative ophthalmology.
- Nuhu Mbogo Kyabasinga – Prince of the Buganda Kingdom.
- Solomon King Kanform – Gambian professional footballer.
- Jamilah Kolocotronis – American writer and former educator in American Islamic schools.

=== L ===
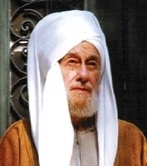
Martin Lings, English writer, Islamic scholar, and philosopher, and an authority on the works of William Shakespeare. He is best known as the author of Muhammad: His Life Based on the Earliest Sources.

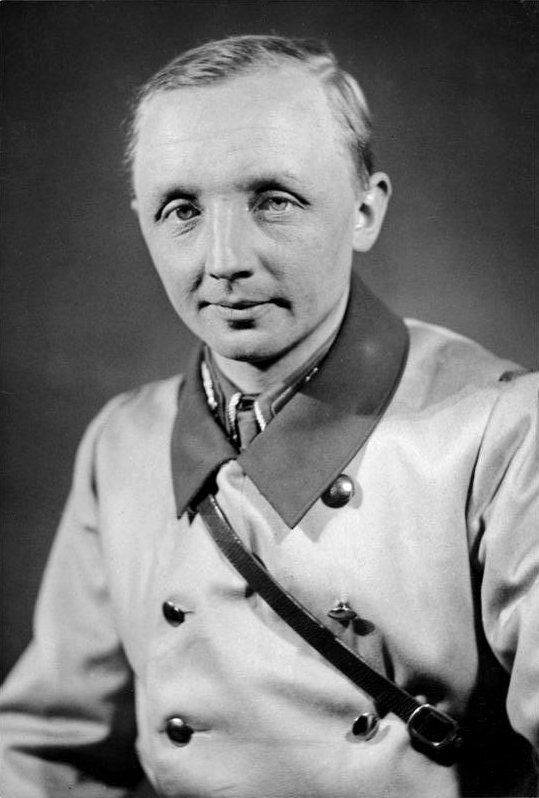
Johann von Leers, German professor and Nazi ideologue known for his anti-Jewish polemics. He was an honorary ''Sturmbannführer'' in the Waffen-SS and a high-ranking official in the Third Reich's propaganda ministry.

- Yusef Lateef – American jazz musician.
- Johann von Leers – German Advisor to Mohamed Naguib and head of the Institute for the Study of Zionism.
- Hajj Muhammad Legenhausen – American philosopher and professor of philosophy at the Imam Khomeini's Educational and Research Institute.
- Martin Lings – British intellectual and author.
- Jeffrey Lang – American mathematician and professor at the University of Kansas.
- Ong Yoke Lin – Malaysian politician, former government minister and founder of the Malaysian Chinese Association.
- Aisha Lemu – British-born author and religious educator who converted to Islam in 1961.
- Joseph E. B. Lumbard – American Muslim scholar of Islamic studies and associate professor of Quranic studies at the College of Islamic Studies at Hamad Bin Khalifa University.
- Loon – American former rapper.
- Amber Leibrock – American female mixed martial artist.
- Tage Lindbom – Swedish mystic and conservative philosopher, who early in his life was the party theoretician and director of the archives of the Swedish Social Democratic Party 1938–1965.
- Sal Lavallo – American traveller. He is one of the youngest people to have visited every country.
- Poppy Liu – American actress of Chinese descent.
- Kevin Lee – American professional mixed martial artist.
- Dominique-France Loeb-Picard – French ex-wife of Fuad II, former King of Egypt and the Sudan.
- Alexander Litvinenko – British-naturalised Russian defector and former officer of the Russian Federal Security Service.

=== M ===
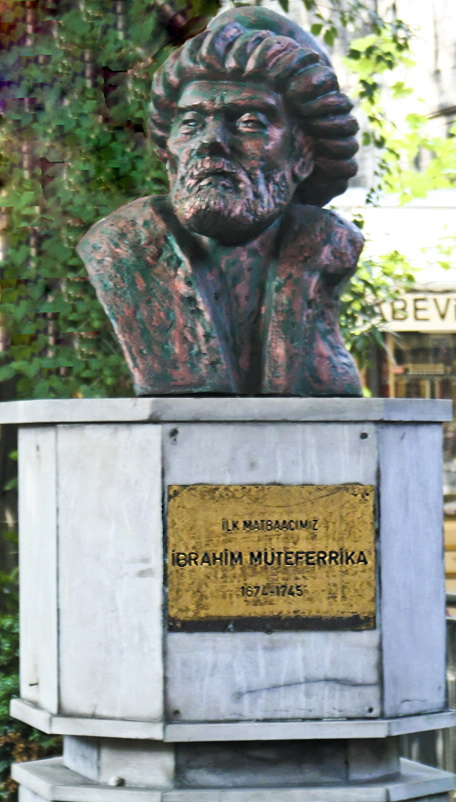
Ibrahim Muteferrika, Hungarian-born Ottoman diplomat, publisher, economist, historian, Islamic theologian, and sociologist. He is regarded as the first Muslim to run a printing press with movable Arabic type.

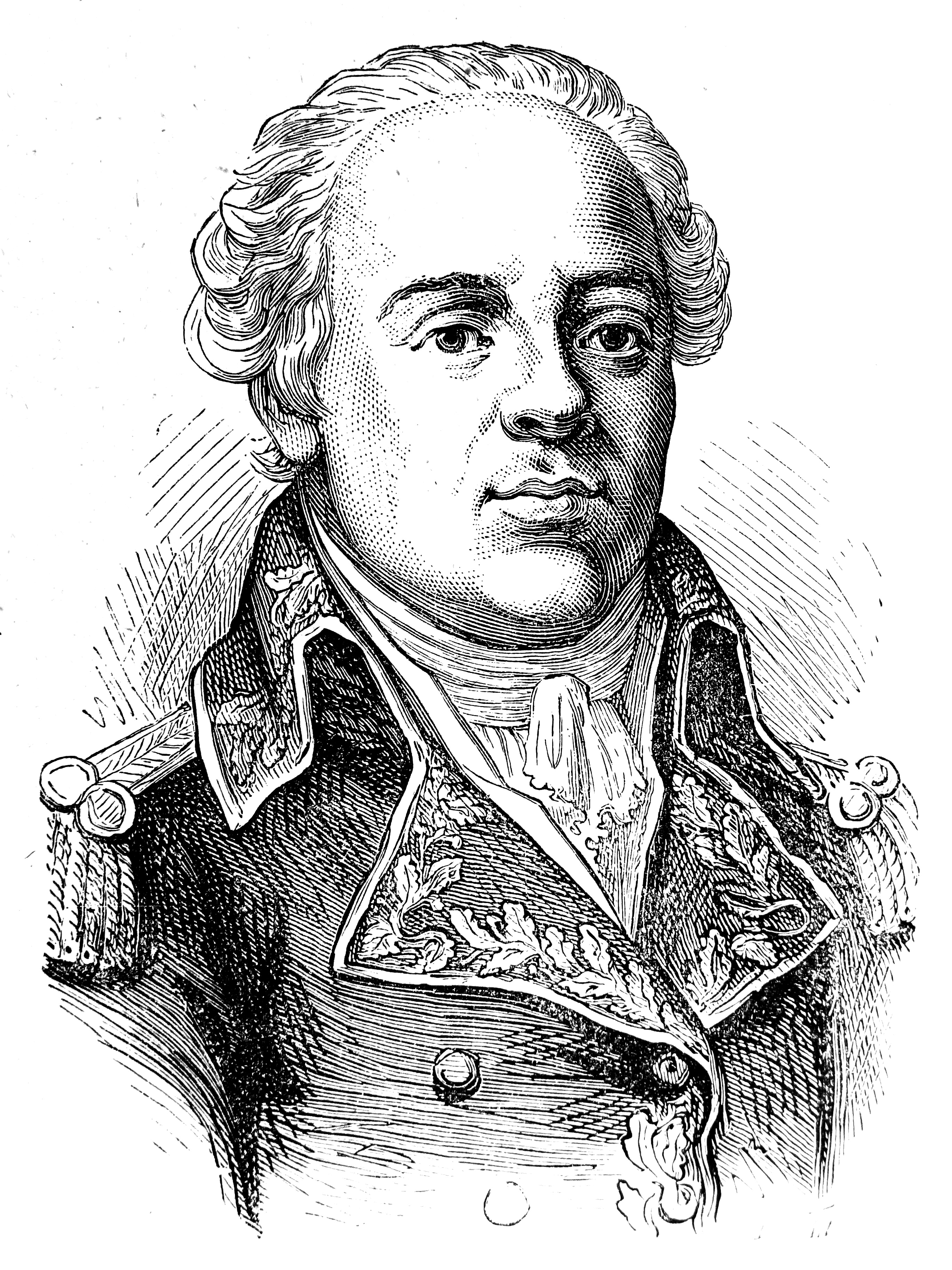
Jacques-François Menou, French Army officer and politician who served in the French Revolutionary and Napoleonic Wars.

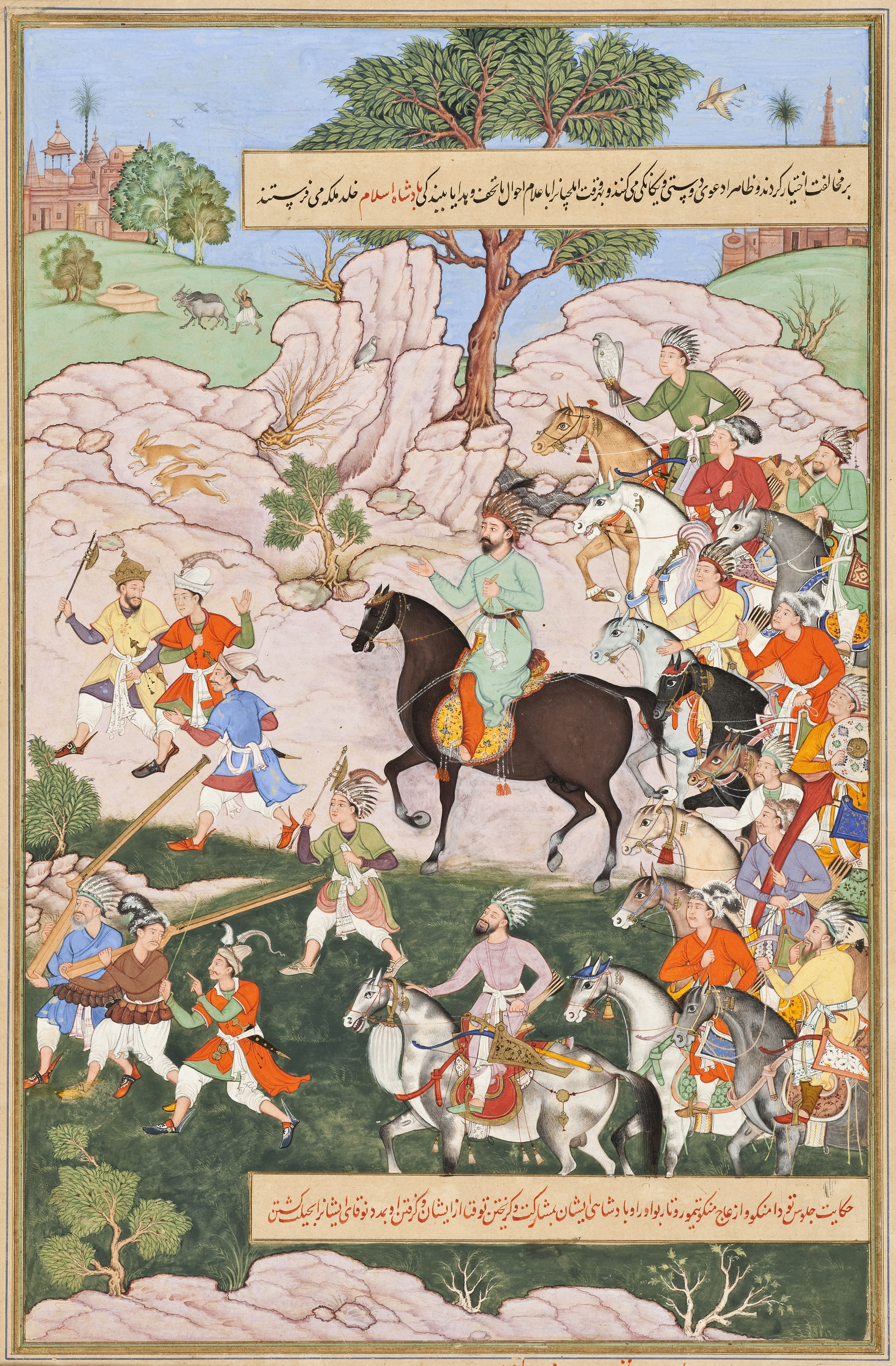
Tode Mongke, Mongol ruler of the Golden Horde. His reign was a significant episode in the early Islamization of the state.

- Hugo Marcus – German-Jewish academic, author, teacher, and political activist.
- Abu Ali ibn Muhammad – The king of the Ghurid dynasty.
- Carmen Marton – Australian taekwondo athlete. She is Australia's first ever world taekwondo champion.
- Diego Michiels – Indonesian professional footballer.
- Moses McKenzie – British writer. His debut novel "An Olive Grove in Ends " won the Hawthornden Prize and the Somerset Maugham Prize.
- Harun ibn Musa – Scholar of the Arabic language and Islamic studies.
- Henry de Monfreid – French adventurer and author.
- Mleh, Prince of Armenia – The eighth lord of Armenian Cilicia (1170–1175).
- Steven Moreira – French-born Cape Verdean professional footballer who plays as a right-back or centre-back for Major League Soccer club Columbus Crew and the Cape Verde national football team.
- Mu'adh ibn Muslim – General and governor for the Abbasid Caliphate.
- Peter Murphy – English singer and songwriter.
- Vendry Mofu – Indonesian professional footballer who plays as a midfielder.
- Yann M'Vila – French professional footballer.
- Köse Mihal – Byzantine governor of Chirmenkia and battle companion of Osman Ghazi.
- Preacher Moss – American stand-up comedian and writer.
- Félix Marquardt – French author, consultant, entrepreneur, producer and strategic advisor.
- Yahyah Michot – Belgian Muslim academic who was a professor of Islamic studies.
- Ibn Mammati – Egyptian official who served as head of the government departments under Saladin and his successor, al-Aziz Uthman, as well as being a noted poet and prolific writer.
- Eddie Mustafa Muhammad – American former professional boxer who held the WBA light heavyweight world title. He has since worked as a boxing trainer, and as an occasional actor.
- Calvin Muhammad – American professional football wide receiver in the National Football League (NFL) for the Los Angeles Raiders, Washington Redskins, and San Diego Chargers.
- Malikussaleh (born Merah Silu) – Founder of the Samudera Pasai Sultanate (r. 1267–1297).
- Matthew Saad Muhammad – American professional boxer who was the WBC Light Heavyweight Champion of the World for two-and-a-half years.
- Mangkunegara X – Prince of Mangkunegaran Principality.
- Fiston Mayele – Congolese professional footballer
- Manuchar Sharvashidze – Prince of the Principality of Abkhazia from circa 1730 to 1757.
- Mandla Mandela – The tribal chief of the Mvezo Traditional Council and the grandson of Nelson Mandela.
- Yahya ibn Abi Mansur – Senior Persian official from the Banu al-Munajjim family, who served as an astronomer and an astrologer at the court of Abbasid caliph al-Ma'mun.
- Pál Márkházy – Hungarian nobleman who tried to seize the Principality of Transylvania against Sigismund Báthory.
- Prabir Mitra – Bangladeshi film actor.
- Mohamed Mahdi Marboua (born Timothée Marboua) – Central African military officer and politician.
- Sergey Morozov – Kazakhstani mixed martial arts fighter.
- Mounir Mourad – Egyptian actor.
- Jake Matthews – Australian mixed martial arts fighter.
- Mustafa Mijajlović – Bosnian journalist and sportscaster.
- Anton Medan – Indonesian former robber and gambling tycoon.
- Ali Mech – 13th-century tribal chief.
- Jacques-François Menou – French general under Napoleon and military governor of Egypt.
- Sa'id ibn Makhlad – Senior official of the Abbasid Caliphate.
- Abdoulaye Miskine (born Martin Koutamadji) – Central African rebel leader.
- Daniel Moore – American poet, essayist and librettist.
- Mohammed Manga – Senegalese professional footballer.
- Markus Haris Maulana – Indonesian former professional footballer.
- Monica (stage name for Rekha Maruthiraj) – Former Indian film actress, starred predominantly in Tamil language films; converted to Islam in 2014.
- Indya Moore – American actress.
- Ali Shaheed Muhammad – American hip hop DJ, record producer, rapper and bass guitarist, best known as a member of A Tribe Called Quest.
- Bruno Metsu – French footballer and football manager.
- Idris Muhammad (born Leo Morris) – American jazz musician.
- Anthony Mundine – Australian boxer; former two-time Super Middleweight champion.
- Cesar Adib Majul – Filipino historian.
- Tode Mongke – Khan of the Golden Horde, division of the Mongol Empire from 1280 to 1287, he converted to Islam in 1280.
- Ibrahim Muteferrika – Ottoman polymath, ethnic Hungarian Unitarian.
- Rebecca Masterton – British Islamic scholar, author and television presenter.
- Jean-Louis Michon – French traditionalist and translator who specialized in Islamic art and Sufism.
- Ingrid Mattson – Canadian activist and scholar, professor of Islamic studies.
- Eva de Vitray-Meyerovitch – French scholar of Islam, a researcher at the Centre national de la recherche scientifique (CNRS), and a translator and writer.
- Ryoichi Mita – Japanese Muslim who is considered the first-ever Muslim to translate the Quran into the Japanese language.
- Insan Mokoginta – Indonesian Islamic preacher.
- Jeff Monson – Mixed martial artist, boxer, and submission grappler.
- Patrick Mboma – Cameroonian former professional footballer who played as a striker.
- Travis Mutyaba – Ugandan professional footballer.
- David Myatt – British writer, modern pagan, former Neo-Nazi-activist.
- Rabeya Müller – German Islamic scholar.
- Jamil Mukulu – Ugandan militant leader and suspected war criminal.
- Jamiro Monteiro – Cape Verdean professional footballer.

=== N ===
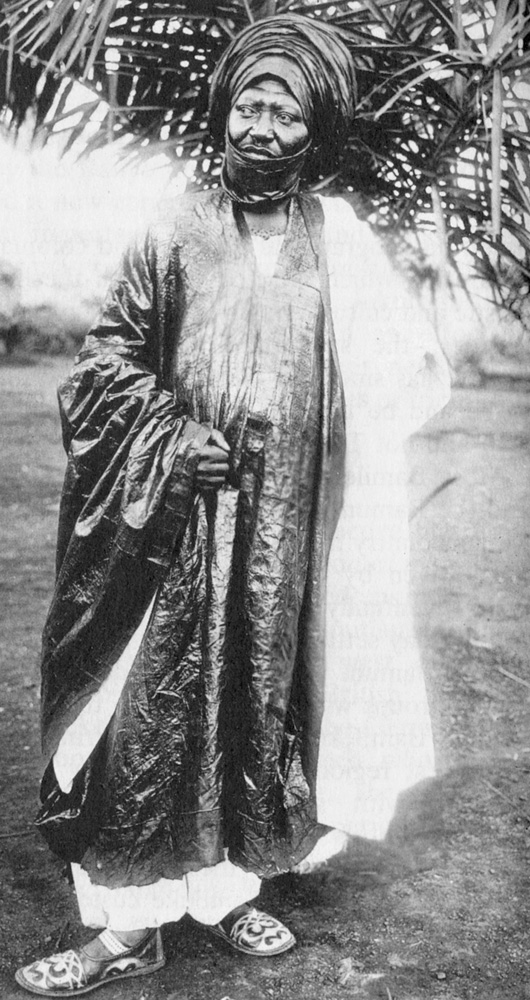
Ibrahim Njoya, king of the Bamum people in Cameroon, renowned for developing the Bamum script and promoting cultural, educational, and administrative reforms.

- Nawrūz (Mongol emir) – Emir, he played an important role in the politics of the Mongol Ilkhanate.
- Nursultan Nazarbayev – Former President of Kazakhstan.
- Negudar – Mongol general and noyan.
- Ibrahim Njoya – The seventeenth sultan of the Kingdom of Bamum.
- Eddie Newton – English football manager and former professional footballer.
- Adam Neuser – Protestant pastor of Heidelberg who held Antitrinitarian views. He later converted to Islam and traveled to Istanbul where he served the Ottoman Sultan.
- Jalal Mansur Nuriddin – American poet and musician.
- Abdullah Numan – Serbian-Australian academic and Islamic cleric.
- Lin Nu – Chinese merchant and scholar in the early Ming dynasty.
- Rajat Neogy – Ugandan of Indian Bengali ancestry, was a writer, poet and publisher.
- Shotaro Noda – Japanese journalist who is thought to be the first known Japanese convert to Islam.
- Neelo – Pakistani veteran film actress.
- Lev Nussimbaum – Ukrainian-born Jewish writer and journalist.
- Kō Nakata – Japanese Islamic scholar and author.
- John Nelson – One of the earliest known Englishmen to convert to Islam.
- Naubakht – Persian astrologers from Ahvaz (in the present-day Khuzestan province, Iran) who lived in the 8th and 9th centuries AD.

=== O ===
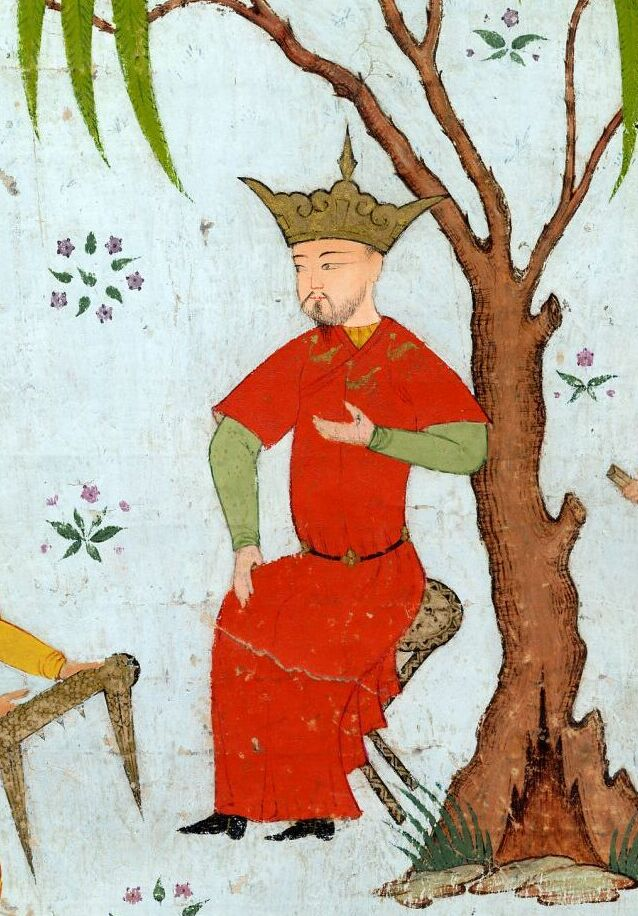
Öljaitü, Ilkhanid ruler whose reign marked a significant phase in the political and religious history of the Mongol Empire in Persia.

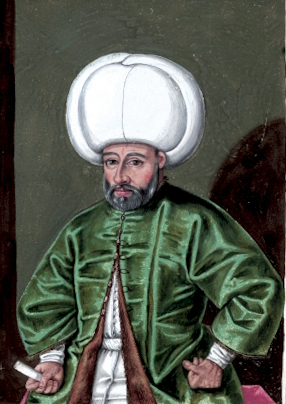
Occhiali, Italian privateer and admiral who served as the commander of the Regency of Algiers and Grand Admiral (Kapudan Pasha) of the Ottoman fleet.

- Öljaitü – The eighth Ilkhanid dynasty ruler from 1304 to 1316 in Tabriz, Iran.
- Kōzō Okamoto – Japanese communist and member of the Japanese Red Army (JRA).
- Sinéad O'Connor (changed name to Shuhada' Sadaqat) – Irish singer-songwriter; a former excommunicated Roman Catholic before becoming as Nondenominational Trinitarian Christian for several years and later Sunni Islam over theological reasons.
- Susanne Osthoff – German archaeologist and aid worker who had worked in Iraq since 1991, and was abducted en route to Abdil, for 3 weeks. She was later quoted to have said her kidnappers did not want ransom, but German humanitarian aid.
- Occhiali – Italian privateer and admiral.
- Moji Olaiya – Nigerian actress.
- Amina Okueva – Ukrainian surgeon and servicewoman.
- Ragnar Oratmangoen – Professional footballer.
- B.G. Knocc Out – American West Coast rapper.
- Jeremiah Owusu-Koramoah – American professional football linebacker for the Cleveland Browns of the National Football League (NFL).

=== P ===
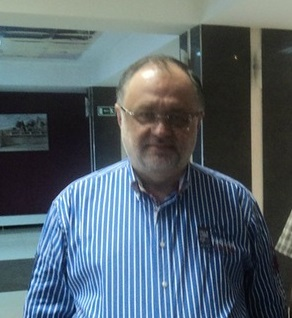
Vyacheslav Polosin, Russian religious scholar, former Orthodox priest, and politician known for his work on Islam and interfaith dialogue.

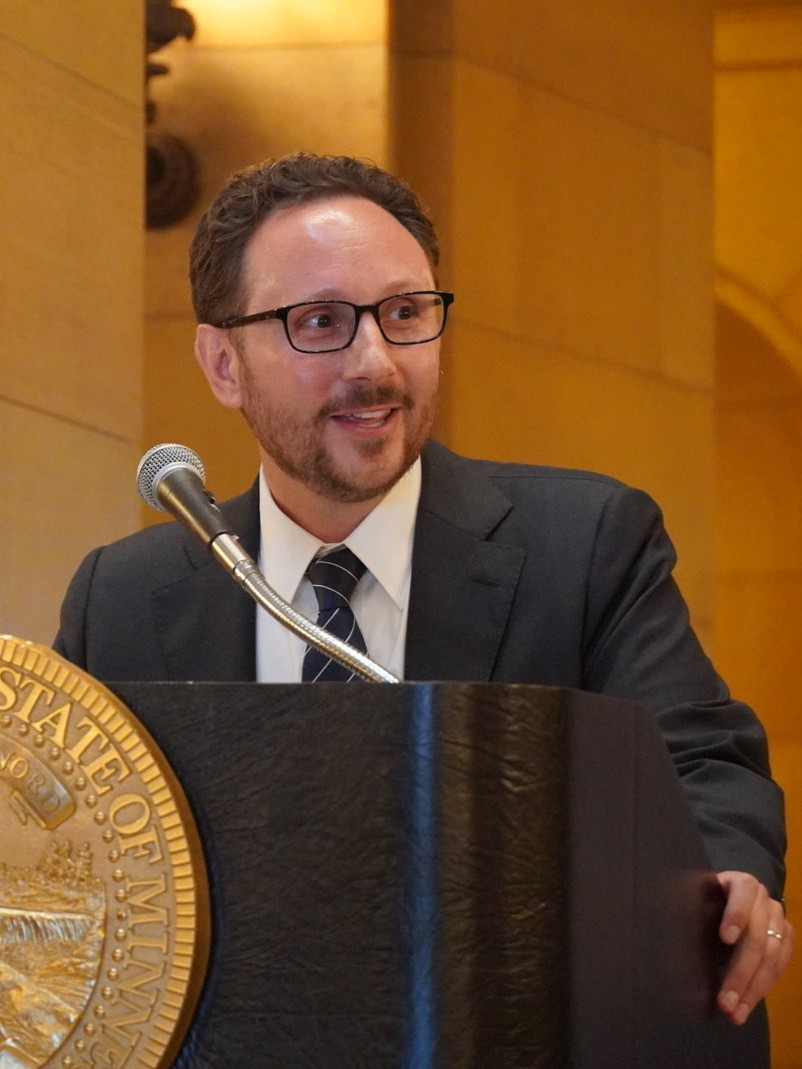
Karl Procaccini, American jurist and attorney serving as an associate justice of the Minnesota Supreme Court.

Paul Pogba, French professional footballer who plays as a central midfielder. Regarded as one of the best midfielders of his generation.

- Charles Pelham – British peer and landowner. He was 8th Earl of Yarborough
- Andreas Palaiologos (son of Manuel) – Ottoman court official.
- Robin Padilla – Filipino actor and politician serving as senator of the Philippines.
- Paul Pogba – French professional footballer.
- Naledi Pandor – South African politician and Minister of International Relations and Cooperation.
- Idris Phillips – American musician, composer, songwriter, and music producer.
- Maruthanayagam Pillai – Commandant of the British East India Company's Madras Army.
- Vinnie Paz – Italian-American rapper and producer.
- Koca Yusuf Pasha – Grand Vizier of the Ottoman Empire.
- Koca Davud Pasha – Grand Vizier of the Ottoman Empire.
- Cory Paterson – Australian professional rugby league player.
- Wayne Parnell – South African cricketer.
- Sophie Pétronin – French-Swiss humanitarian aid worker and nutritionist.
- Damat Hasan Pasha – Grand Vizier of the Ottoman Empire from 1703 to 1704.
- Photios – Byzantine renegade served the Emirate of Crete as a naval commander in the 870s.
- Thomas Partey – Ghanaian football player.
- Hamza Perez – Puerto Rican former American rap artist.
- Sokollu Mehmed Pasha – Grand Vizier of the Ottoman Empire from 1565 to 1579.
- Salman the Persian – Persian companion of the Islamic prophet Muhammad.
- Ismail Selim Pasha – Egyptian-Greek Ottoman general.
- Hurshid Pasha – Ottoman general and Grand Vizier during the early 19th century.
- Mesih Pasha – Grand Vizier of the Ottoman Empire from 1499 to 1501.
- Hersekzade Ahmed Pasha – Ottoman Bosnian general and five-times grand vizier of the Ottoman Empire.
- Michael Page – English professional mixed martial artist.
- Kuyucu Murad Pasha – Ottoman Bosnian statesman who served as Grand Vizier of the Ottoman Empire.
- Zagan Pasha – Grand Vizier of the Ottoman Empire from 1453 to 1456.
- Cığalazade Yusuf Sinan Pasha – Ottoman Italian statesman who held the office of Grand Vizier.
- Erwann Le Péchoux – French left-handed foil fencer.
- Telli Hasan Pasha – Ottoman beylerbey (vali) of Bosnia and a notable Ottoman Bosnian military commander.
- Pargalı Ibrahim Pasha – Grand Vizier of the Ottoman Empire.
- Mehmed Ali Pasha – Prussian-born Ottoman career officer and marshal.
- Azad Peroz – Iranian nobleman who served as the governor of the Sasanian province of Mazun.
- Abdul Wahid Pedersen – Danish Imam.
- Mustafa Celalettin Pasha – Polish noble who served in the Ottoman army.
- Bilal Philips – Jamaican-born Canadian contemporary Muslim teacher, speaker, and author.
- Marmaduke Pickthall – British Islamic scholar, known for an English translation of the Quran.
- Parameswara – Last king of Singapura and the founder of Malacca.
- Sean Price – American rapper and member of the hip-hop collective Boot Camp Clik.
- Julio Cesar Pino – Professor of History at Kent State University in Kent, Ohio.
- Omar Pasha – Ottoman field marshal and governor.
- Hamza Roberto Piccardo – Italian Islamic leader was Member of the Directive Council of UCOII.
- Taqwa Pinero – American former professional basketball player.
- Yunus Pasha – Grand Vizier of the Ottoman Empire.
- Abd al Wahid Pallavicini – Italian Muslim preacher who was one of the leading figures in European Sufism.
- Gladys Milton Palmer – British film producer and heiress, member of the ruling dynasty of Sarawak.
- St John Philby – British Arabist, advisor, explorer, writer, and a colonial intelligence officer.
- Vyacheslav Polosin – Russian Muslim academic and former priest of the Russian Orthodox Church.
- Karl Procaccini – American lawyer who serves as an associate justice of the Minnesota Supreme Court.
- Hacı Salih Pasha – Ottoman grand vizier.
- Tynan Power – American progressive Muslim activist.

=== Q ===
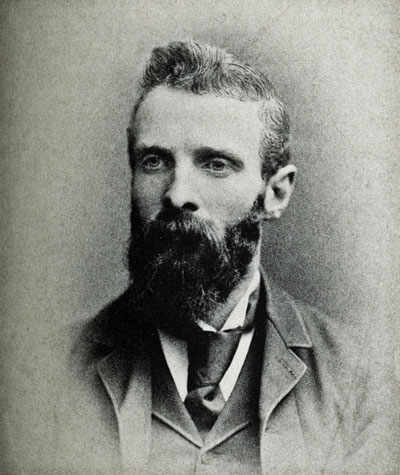
Abdullah Quilliam, British Islamic scholar, writer, and advocate known for his pioneering efforts to establish Islam in Britain and promote Islamic education and outreach.

- Abdullah Quilliam (born William Henry Quilliam) – British convert from Christianity to Islam, noted for founding England's first mosque and Islamic centre.
- Robin Quaison – Swedish professional footballer.
- Mirza Hasan Qatil – 18th-century Urdu and Persian-language poet and author.
- Qarin I – The eighth ruler of the Bavand dynasty from 839 to 867.
- Qaratis – The umm walad of the eighth Abbasid caliph al-Mu'tasim, and mother of his successor, al-Wathiq.
- Dwight Muhammad Qawi – American professional boxer.
- Q-Tip – American rapper and record producer.
- Jacob Querido – The successor of the self-proclaimed Jewish Messiah Sabbatai Zevi.

=== R ===
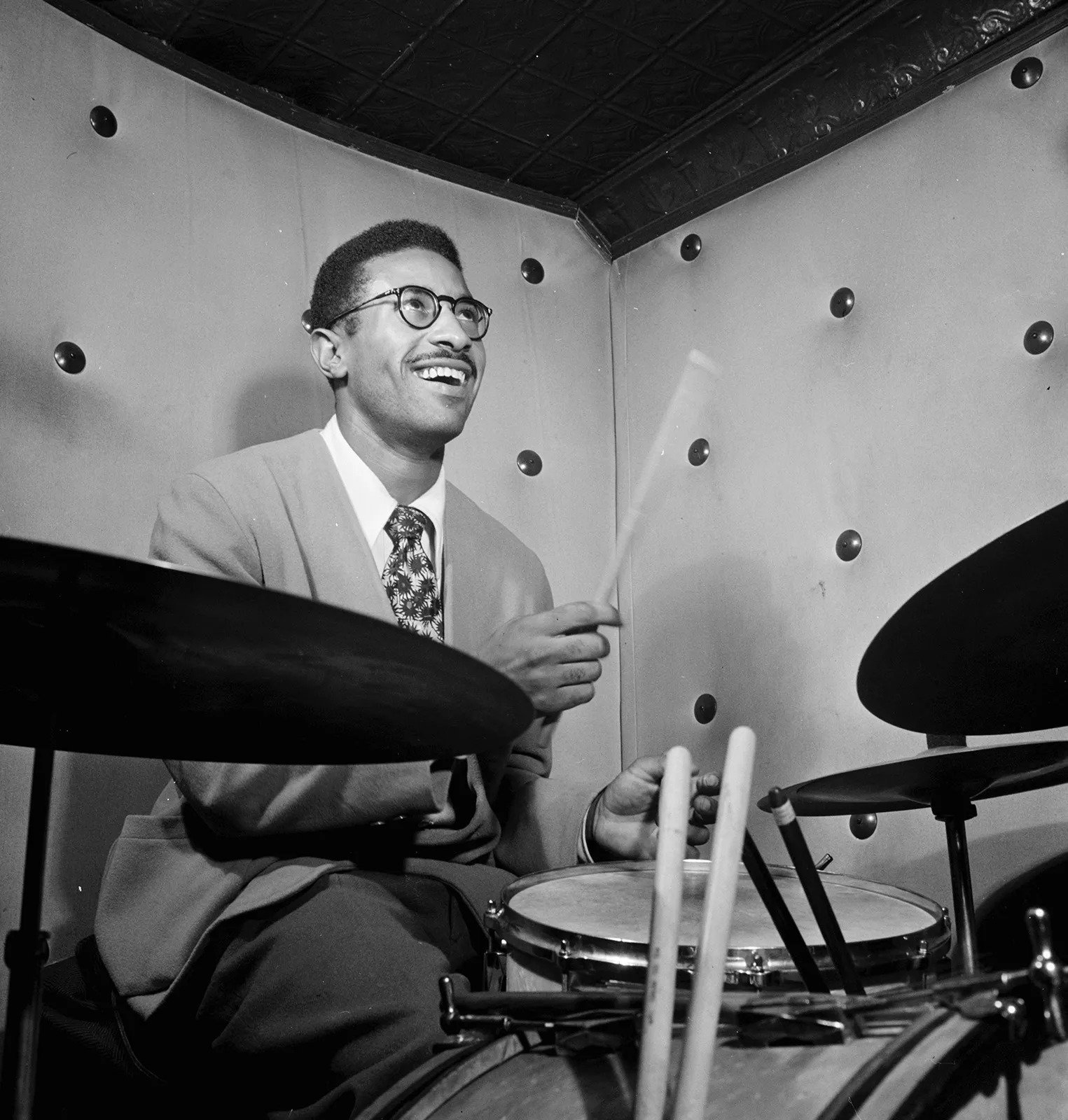
Max Roach, American jazz drummer and composer. A pioneer of bebop, he worked in many other styles of music and is generally considered one of the most important drummers in history.

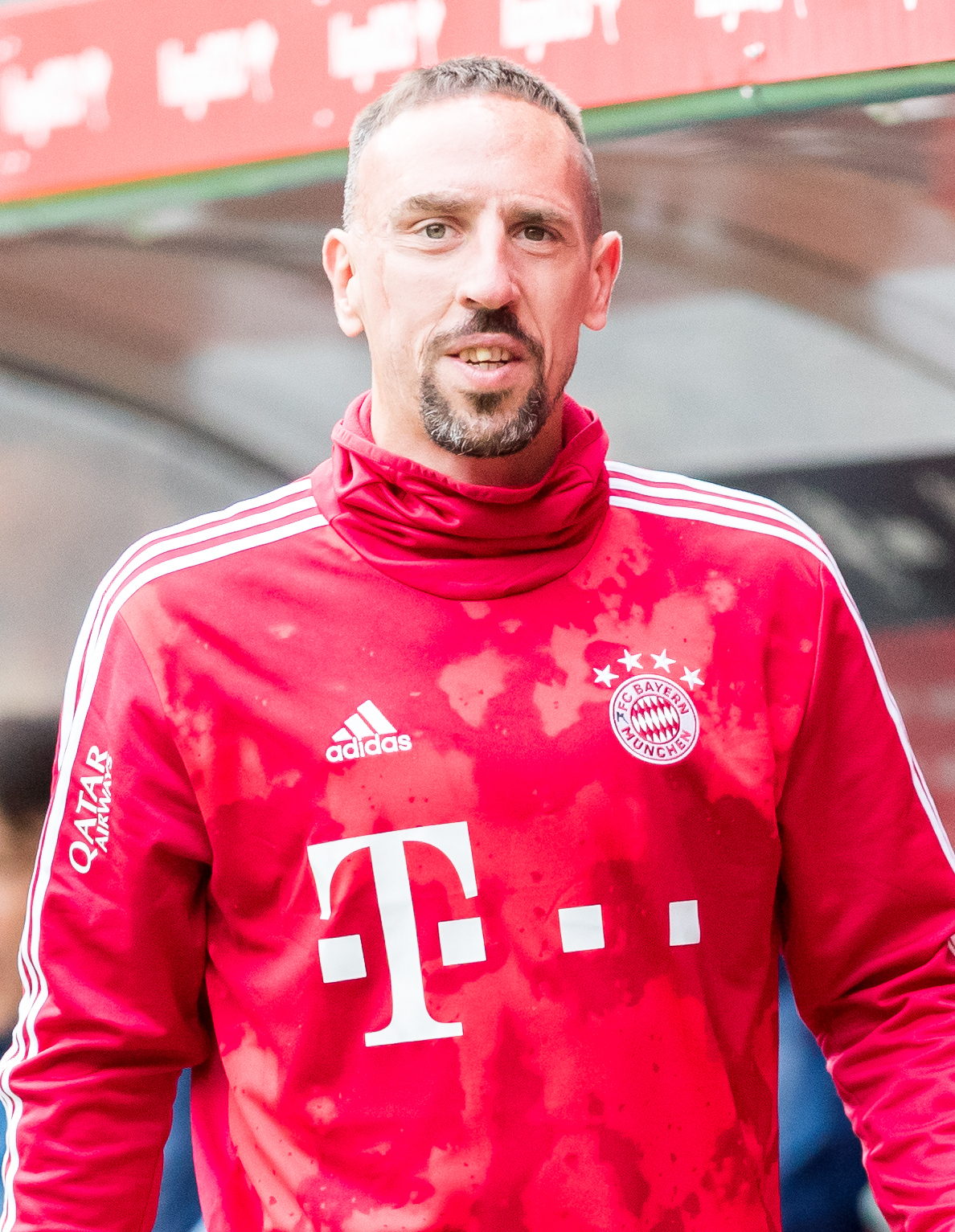
Franck Ribéry, French former professional footballer who primarily played as a winger. He is regarded as one of the best players of his generation and one of the greatest wingers in the history of the sport.

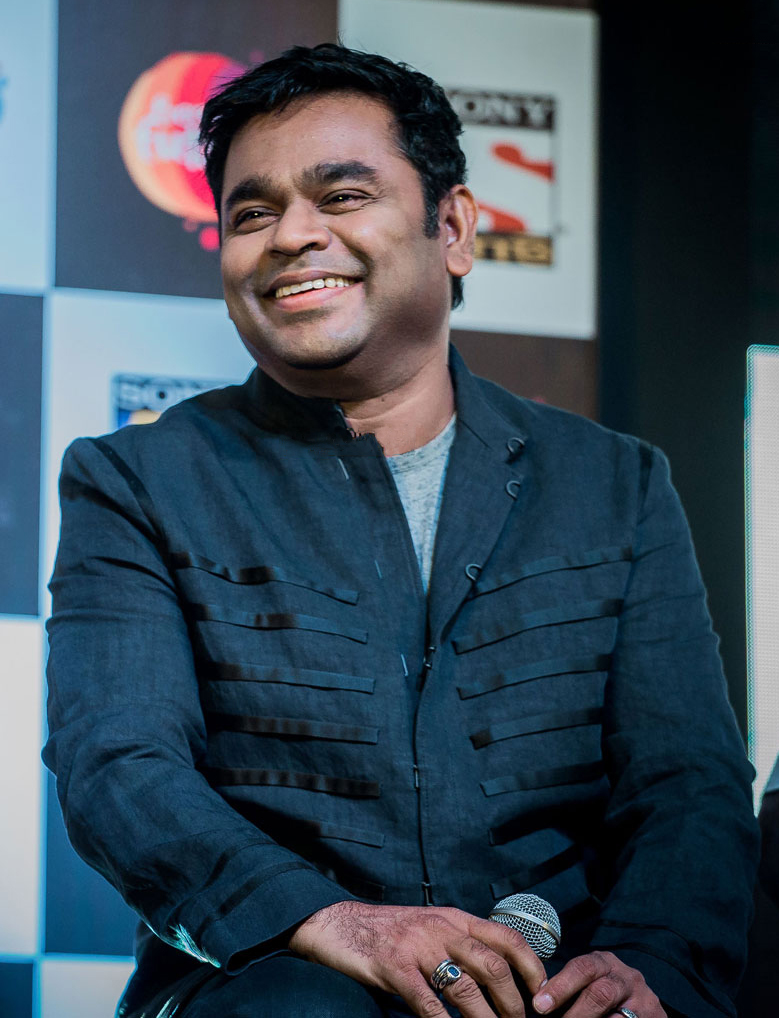
A. R. Rahman, Indian music composer, record producer, singer, songwriter, multi-instrumentalist, and philanthropist known for his work in Indian cinema, predominantly in Tamil and Hindi films, with occasional forays into international cinema.

- Rinchan – The founder and the first sultan of the Sultanate of Kashmir from 1320 to 1323.
- Ramathipadi I – King of Cambodia.
- Mario Rossi (architect) – Italian architect and notable contributor to 20th-century Islamic architecture.
- Sulayman Reis – 17th-century Dutch corsair.
- Raekwon – American rapper.
- Ruzaiq – Iranian nobleman who lived during the 7th and 8th centuries.
- A. R. Rahman – Indian composer, musician, singer-songwriter, producer and philanthropist.
- Yuvan Shankar Raja – Indian musician; music director from Tamil Nadu.
- Max Roach – American jazz drummer and composer. A pioneer of bebop, he worked in many other styles of music, and is generally considered one of the most important drummers in history.
- Ahmad Rashad (born Robert Earl Moore) – U.S. pro football player and sportscaster for The NFL on NBC.
- Ilie II Rareș – Prince of Moldavia.
- Oskar Rescher – German-Turkish scholar in Arabic, Persian, and Turkish literature who specialized in pre-Islamic Arabic poetry and Ottoman studies.
- Ali Arraez Rabazin – Barbary corsair of the 17th century.
- Rozina – Pakistani film actress.
- Rainald of Broyes – Italian lord who participated in the People's Crusade as a leader in the army of Peter the Hermit.
- Georges Ruggiu – Belgian radio presenter who worked for Rwandan radio station Radio Télévision Libre des Mille Collines, which played a significant role in promoting the genocide against the Tutsi.
- Mahmoud Bodo Rasch – German architect, founder and owner of SL Rasch GmbH Special and Lightweight Structures.
- Sérgio Ricardo – Brazilian professional footballer.
- David Roe – English former professional snooker player.
- Saleem Raza – Pakistani film playback singer.
- MC Ren (born Lorenzo Patterson) – American rapper and hip-hop producer.
- Franck Ribéry – France national football team player.
- Hamza Robertson (born Tom Robertson) – English singer.
- Yvonne Ridley – British journalist, author and politician. She was a former chair of the National Council of the now-defunct Respect Party.
- Christian Rontini – Filipino professional footballer.
- Leda Rafanelli – Italian publisher, anarchist, and prolific author.
- Mahalini Raharja – Indonesian singer and actress.
- Na'ima B. Robert – Author of multicultural literature and founding editor of the UK-based Muslim women's publication, SISTERS Magazine.
- Abu-l-Hasan Ali ibn Ruburtayr – Son of Reverter viscount of Barcelona and Muslim Catalan mercenary commander.

=== S ===
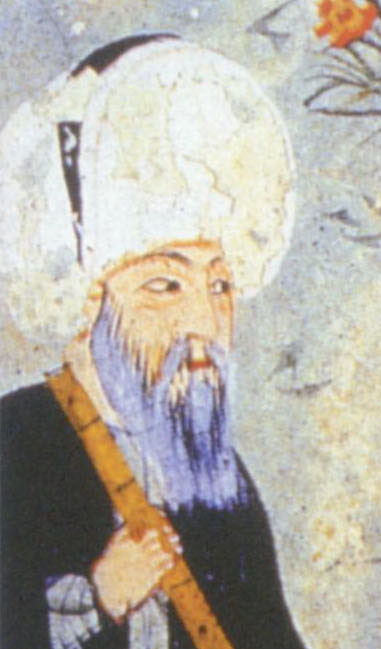
Mimar Sinan, Ottoman architect and engineer, widely regarded as one of the greatest architects in history and a leading figure in classical Ottoman architecture.

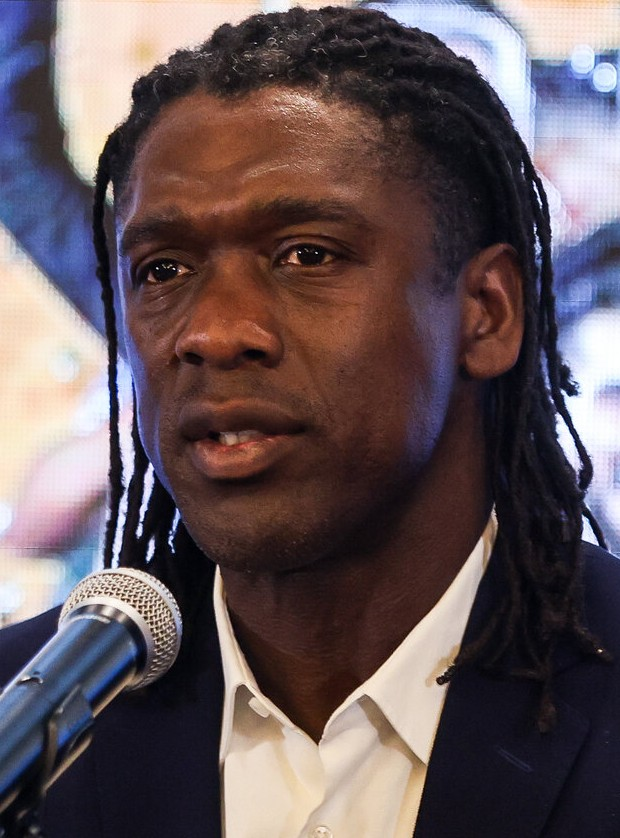
Clarence Seedorf, Dutch professional football manager and former player. Widely regarded as one of the greatest midfielders of all time, he is one of the most successful players in UEFA Champions League history.

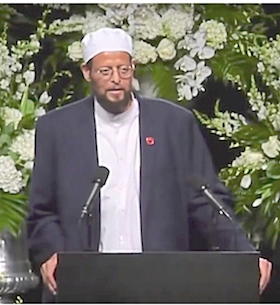
Zaid Shakir, American prominent scholar and co-founder of Zaytuna College in Berkeley, California.

- Max Stanford – American civil rights activist.
- Daniel Southern – Former Australian rules footballer who played with the Western Bulldogs in the Australian Football League (AFL).
- Olive Salaman – Welsh community leader.
- Malik ul Salih – Acehnese who established the first Muslim state of Samudera Pasai in the year 1267.
- Mimar Sinan – The chief Ottoman architect, engineer and mathematician for sultans Suleiman the Magnificent, Selim II and Murad III.
- Jalaluddin Muhammad Shah (born Jadu) – Sultan of Bengal.
- Cat Stevens – English singer-songwriter, instrumentalist and activist.
- Abd Allah ibn Salam – Companion of the Islamic prophet Muhammad.
- Anthony Small – Retired professional boxer and Islamic political activist.
- Abdallah Schleifer – American Middle East scholar.
- Al-Fadl ibn Sahl – Persian vizier of the Abbasid era in Khurasan, who served under Caliph al-Ma'mun (r. 813–832).
- Ulrich Jasper Seetzen – German explorer of Arabia and Palestine from Jever, German Frisia.
- Rakhi Sawant (born Neeru Bheda) – Indian dancer, model, actress.
- Djed Spence – English professional footballer.
- Abdul Salaam – American professional football defensive tackle.
- Strongilah – Jewish businesswoman in the Ottoman Empire.
- Henry Stanley, 3rd Baron Stanley of Alderley – British nobleman and historian who translated The first voyage round the world by Magellan and other works from the Age of Discovery.
- Stephen Schwartz – American journalist, columnist, and author.
- Scarface – American rapper and record producer.
- Farqad Sabakhi – Armenian Islamic preacher and an associate of Hasan al-Basri.
- Bijan Beg Saakadze – Safavid courtier, official and royal gholam.
- Ty Dolla Sign – American singer, rapper, songwriter, musician, record producer, and actor.
- Shemavon of Agulis – Iranian official of Armenian origin, who served during the reign of Shah Suleiman I
- Kamala Surayya – Indian poet in English as well as an author in Malayalam from Kerala, India.
- Daniel Streich – Swiss military instructor, community council member and a former member of Swiss People's Party.
- Seljuk – Eponymous founder of the Seljuk dynasty.
- Mehmed Saqizli – Greek Dey and Pasha of Tripolis.
- Osman Saqizli – Greek Dey and Pasha of Tripolis.
- Abdul Majid Sindhi – Sindhi writer, politician and journalist of Sindh.
- Clarence Seedorf – Dutch former professional football players, widely seen as one of the greatest midfielders of all time.
- Al-Mundhir ibn Sawa – Sasanian governor of historical Bahrain.
- Giorgi Saakadze – Georgian politician and military commander who played an important role in the politics of the early 17th-century Georgia.
- Baba Shadi Shaheed (born Dharam Chand Chib) – Former Governor of Kashmir and Kandahar.
- William Seabrook – American occultist, explorer, world traveler, journalist and author.
- Safiye Sultan – Valide Sultan of the Ottoman Empire.
- Sirin bint Shamun – Egyptian Coptic Christian concubine, sent with her sister Maria al-Qibtiyya as gifts to the Islamic prophet Muhammad by the Egyptian official Muqawqis in 628.
- Sahib Shihab (born Edmund Gregory) – American jazz saxophonist and flautist.
- Kelesh Ahmed-Bey Sharvashidze – Prince of Abkhazia.
- Felix Siauw – Chinese-Indonesian Islamic cleric and author affiliated with Hizbut Tahrir Indonesia.
- Aleksandar Seksan – Bosnian actor.
- Bruno Suzuki – Brazilian footballer.
- Ubaidullah Sindhi – Indian Political, religious and revolutionary scholar.
- Mahmudul Hasan Sohag – Founder of Rokomari.com and Onnorokom group.
- Zaid Shakir – American Islamic scholar and co-founder of Zaytuna College in Berkeley, California.
- Robert Stanley – British politician.
- Sean Stone – American actor and Filmmaker, son of filmmaker Oliver Stone.
- Divine Styler – American hip hop musician.
- Abdalqadir as-Sufi (born Ian Dallas) – Scottish convert, a Shaykh of Instruction, leader of the Darqawi-Shadhili-Qadiri Tariqa, founder of the Murabitun World Movement.
- Nahshid Sulaiman – alternative hip hop artist.
- Kabir Suman (born Suman Chattopadhyay) – Indian singer-songwriter, musician, music director, poet, journalist, political activist, TV presenter, and occasional actor.
- Mudzaffar Shah I of Kedah – Legendary king, said to be the first Sultan of Kedah, according to Hikayat Merong Mahawangsa.
- Shah Shahidullah Faridi (born John Gilbert Lennard) – British convert.
- Ibn Sahl of Seville – Jewish poet and diplomat, born in 1212–13 to a Jewish family in Seville.
- Adam See – Malaysian footballer.
- Jlloyd Samuel – Trinidadian professional football coach and player.
- Mubarak Shah (Chagatai Khan) – Khan of the Chagatai Khanate.
- Valentine de Saint-Point – French writer, poet, painter, playwright, art critic, choreographer, lecturer and journalist. She is primarily known for being the first woman to have written a futurist manifesto.
- Dewi Sukarno – Japanese-born Indonesian; she was one of the wives of the first President of Indonesia, Sukarno.
- Peter Sanders – British photographer.
- Khalid Sheldrake – English pickle manufacturer and philanthropist.
- Rudolf von Sebottendorf – German occultist, writer, intelligence agent and political activist. He was the founder of the Thule Society.
- Sneako – American political commentator and online streamer.
- Amin Sweeney – Malay linguist of Anglo-Irish descent.
- Mario Scialoja – Italian diplomat.
- Sam Sloan – American perennial candidate and former broker-dealer.
- Sarup Ram Singh – Maharao of Sirohi in India.
- Amrita Singh – Indian actress, ex-wife of Indian actor Saif Ali Khan.

=== T ===
Anselm Turmeda, Mallorcan Franciscan friar who converted to Islam and became known as ʿAbd Allāh al-Tarjumān, criticized Christian doctrines and advanced Islamic theological arguments against Christianity.

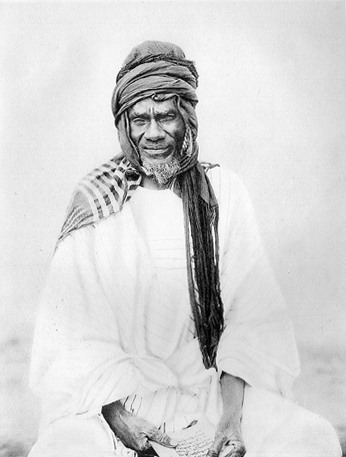
Samori Ture, West African Muslim ruler and military leader who founded the Wassoulou Empire and led a prolonged resistance against French colonial expansion in the late nineteenth century.

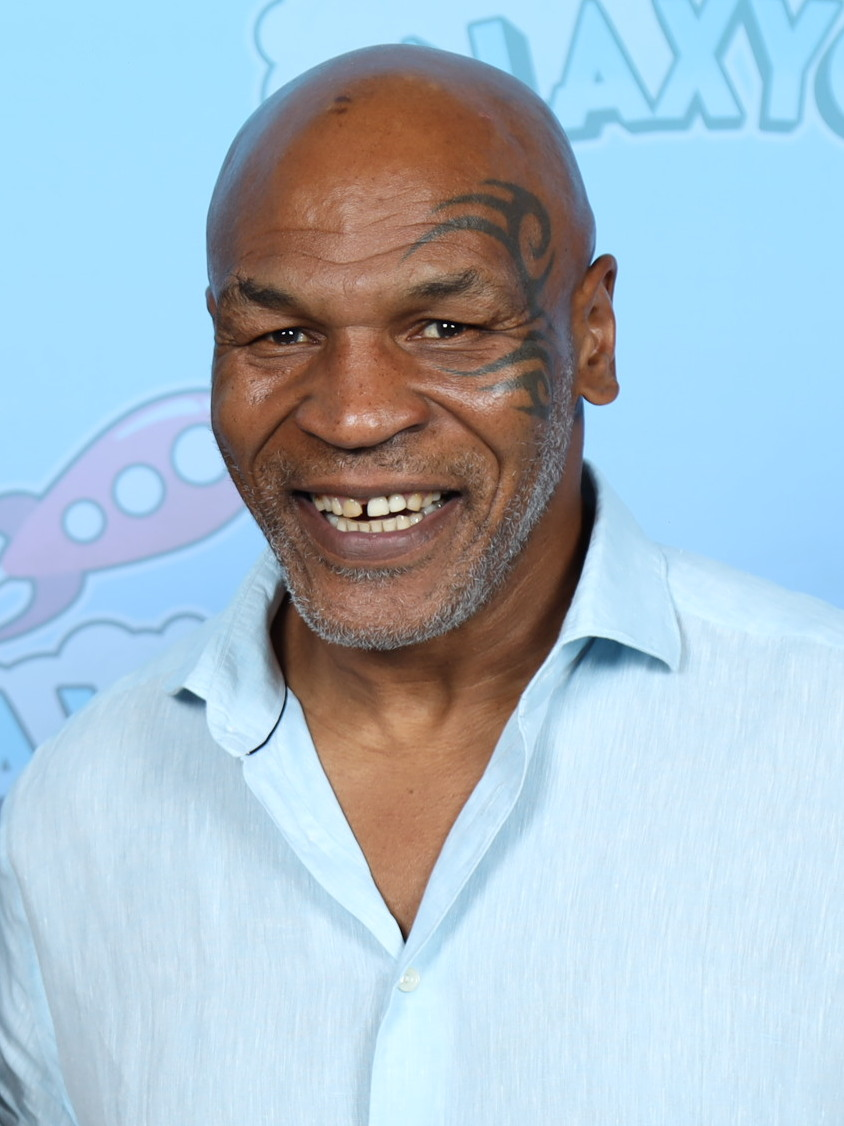
Mike Tyson, American former professional boxer widely regarded as one of the greatest heavyweight boxers of all time and one of the most intimidating men in boxing history.

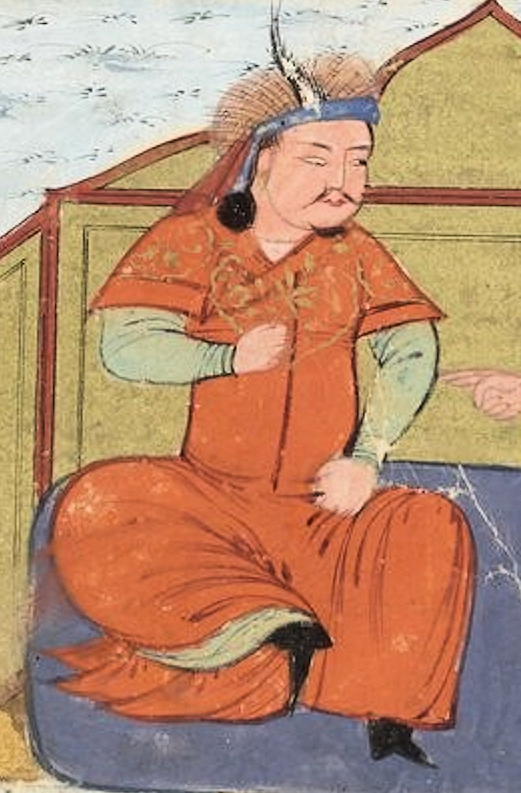
Tekuder, the first Ilkhanid ruler to convert to Islam. His reign marked an early turning point in the Islamization of the Ilkhanate.

- Sharmila Tagore (stage name for Begum Ayesha Sultana) – Indian actress.
- Andrew Tate – Retired American-British kickboxing champion and internet personality.
- Sinan ibn Thabit – Physician and son of Thābit ibn Qurra.
- William Thorson – Former Swedish poker player.
- Malik Maqbul Tilangani (born Malla Yugandharudu) – Vizier of the Delhi Sultanate.
- Tarmashirin – The khan of the Chagatai Khanate.
- Tughlugh Timur – Khan of Moghulistan.
- William Troost-Ekong – Nigerian professional footballer who has represented the Nigeria national team, earning more than 80 caps and serving as captain.
- Mihnea Turcitul – Prince (Voivode) of Wallachia.
- Danny Thompson – English multi-instrumentalist best known as a double bassist, converted to Islam in 1990.
- Leo of Tripoli – Greek renegade and fleet commander for the Abbasid Caliphate in the early tenth century.
- Tekuder – The sultan of the Ilkhanate from 1282 to 1284. He was a son of Hulegu and brother of Abaqa.
- Jacksen F. Tiago – Brazilian retired footballer.
- Apisai Tora – Fijian politician.
- Samori Ture – Founder of the Wassoulou Empire who resisted French rule in West Africa.
- Anselm Turmeda – Christian priest from Mallorca.
- Lie Kiat Teng – Indonesian doctor and politician, former Minister of Health (1953–1955).
- Damian of Tarsus – Byzantine Greek governor of Tarsus in 896–897 and one of the main leaders of naval raids against the Eastern Roman Empire in the early 10th century.
- Ofa Tuʻungafasi – New Zealand rugby player.
- Tamar – Royal princess of the Bagrationi dynasty and principal consort of the Sultanate of Rum as the favorite wife of sultan Kaykhusraw II.
- Iase Tushi – Georgian writer who worked and lived in Safavid Iran.
- Richard Thompson – English songwriter, musician (primarily a guitarist), singer and record producer.
- Philippe Troussier – French former association football player and manager.
- Mike Tyson – American boxer; performer.
- Hana Tajima – English–Japanese visual artist, blogger, model, and fashion designer.
- Hamza Tzortzis (born Andreas Tzortzis) – British public speaker and researcher on Islam. He is known for his book: The Divine Reality: God, Islam and the Mirage of Atheism.

=== U ===
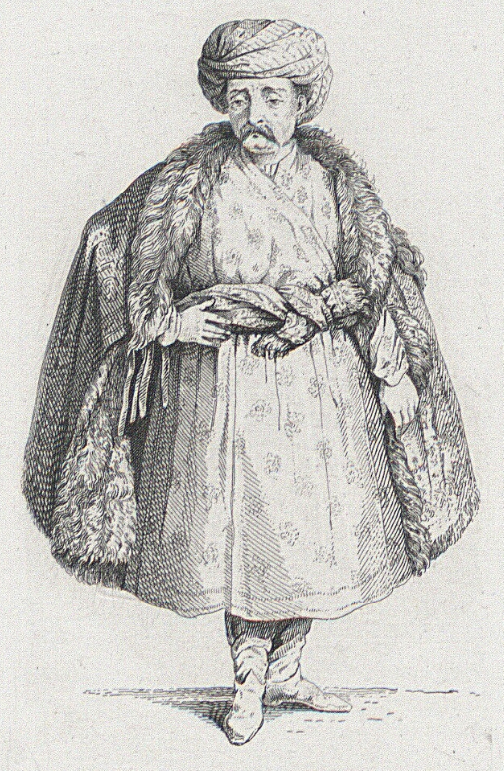
Ali Ufkî, Polish-born Ottoman polymath, court musician, linguist, and biblical translator who served as a cultural intermediary between Europe and the Ottoman world.

- Abu Usamah – Imam at Green Lane Masjid in Birmingham, England.
- Daniil Utkin – Russian professional footballer.
- Ali Ufkî – Polish musician and translator.
- Ismael Urbain – French journalist and interpreter.
- Burhanuddin Ulakan – Islamic cleric (ulama) from the Minangkabau region. He is regarded as the pioneer of Islamic propagators in West Sumatra.
- Wim Umboh – Indonesian director who is best known for his melodramatic romances.
- Charles Upton – American poet and esotericist.

=== V ===
- Jorvan Vieira – Luso-Brazilian football coach.
- Michel Valsan – Romanian diplomat and author.
- Gustavo Victoria – Colombian football player.
- Vakhtang V – king (mepe) of the Georgian Kingdom of Kartli and Prince of Mukhrani.
- Pierre Vogel – German former boxer, now an Islamic preacher.
- Jacques Vergès – Siamese-born French lawyer and anti-colonial activist.
- Esteban Vizcarra – Indonesian professional footballer.

=== W ===
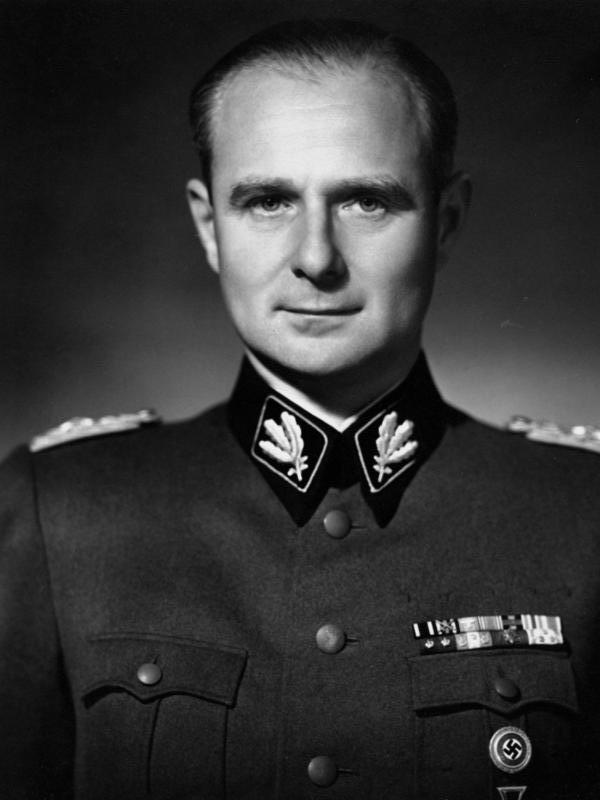
Karl Wolff, senior German Schutzstaffel (SS) officer who served as Chief of Personal Staff to Reichsführer-SS Heinrich Himmler and as an SS liaison to Adolf Hitler during World War II.

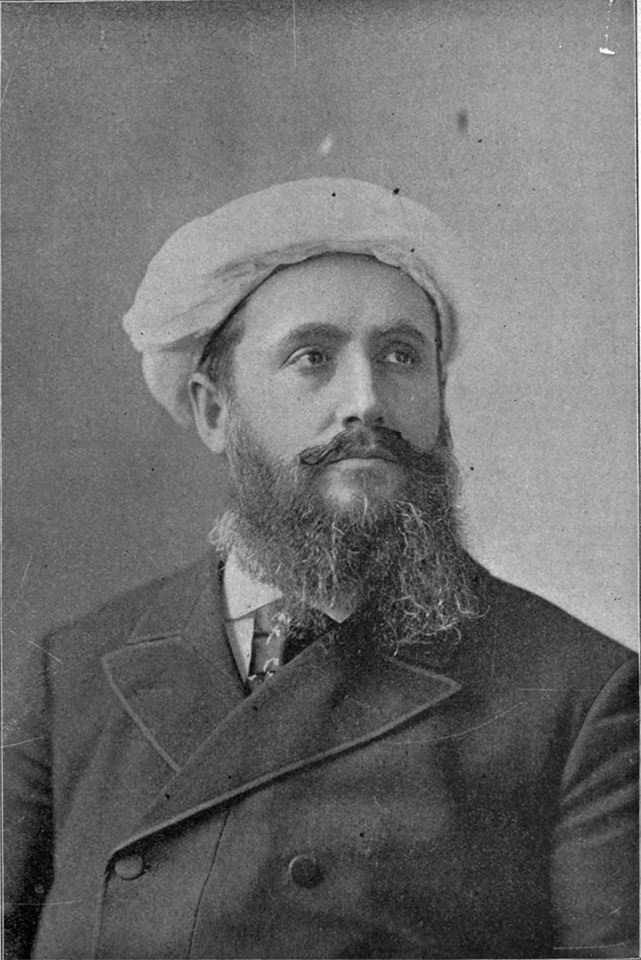
Alexander Russell Webb, American journalist, diplomat, and Islamic writer known as one of the earliest prominent American converts to Islam and for establishing one of the first Islamic missions in the United States.

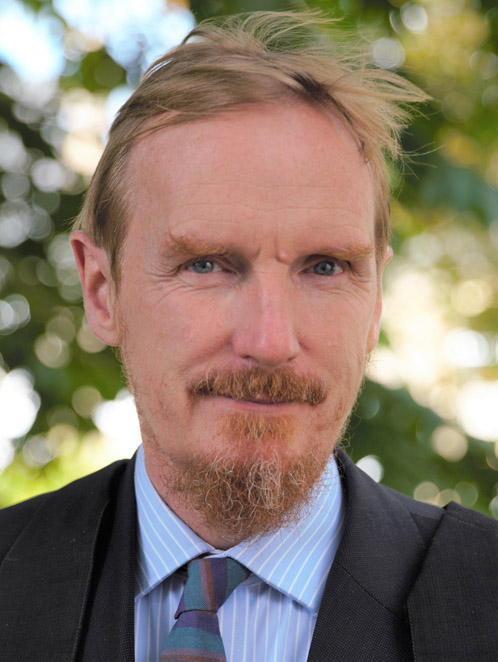
Timothy Winter, British Islamic scholar, theologian, and academic known as Abdal Hakim Murad. A lecturer at the University of Cambridge and founder of Cambridge Muslim College.

- Amina Wadud – American Muslim theologian. In 1972, she converted to Islam, while a student at the University of Pennsylvania.
- Charvarius Ward – American professional football player.
- Dawud Wharnsby – Canadian singer songwriter.
- William Richard Williamson – English adventurer who became an oil company representative in the Persian Gulf.
- Karl Wolff – Senior German Schutzstaffel (SS) officer who served as Chief of Personal Staff Reichsführer-SS (Heinrich Himmler) and an SS liaison to Adolf Hitler during World War II.
- Robert Wangila – Kenyan boxer who won a welterweight gold medal at the 1988 Summer Olympic Games.
- Siraj Wahhaj – African-American imam of At-Taqwa Mosque in Brooklyn, New York, and the leader of The Muslim Alliance in North America (MANA).
- Alexander Russell Webb – American diplomat and writer.
- Sonny Bill Williams – New Zealand rugby player and heavyweight boxer.
- Timothy Winter (Abdul Hakim Murad) – English convert who is the Director of Studies (Theology and Religious Studies) at Wolfson College, University of Cambridge.
- Monica Witt – Former United States Air Force technical sergeant and defense contractor.
- G. Willow Wilson – American comics writer.
- Suhaib Webb – American imam of the Islamic Society of Boston Cultural Center (ISBCC).
- Jack Ward – English pirate who later became a Corsair for the Ottoman Empire operating out of Tunis during the early 17th century.
- Butch Ware – American academic, rapper and politician.
- John Whitehead – American singer and songwriter.
- Danny Williams – British former professional boxer who competed from 1995 to 2023.
- Michael Wolfe – American poet, author, and the President and Executive Producer of Unity Productions Foundation.
- Dhoruba bin Wahad – American political activist and author, former leader of the New York Black Panther Party, and co-founder of the Black Liberation Army.

=== X ===
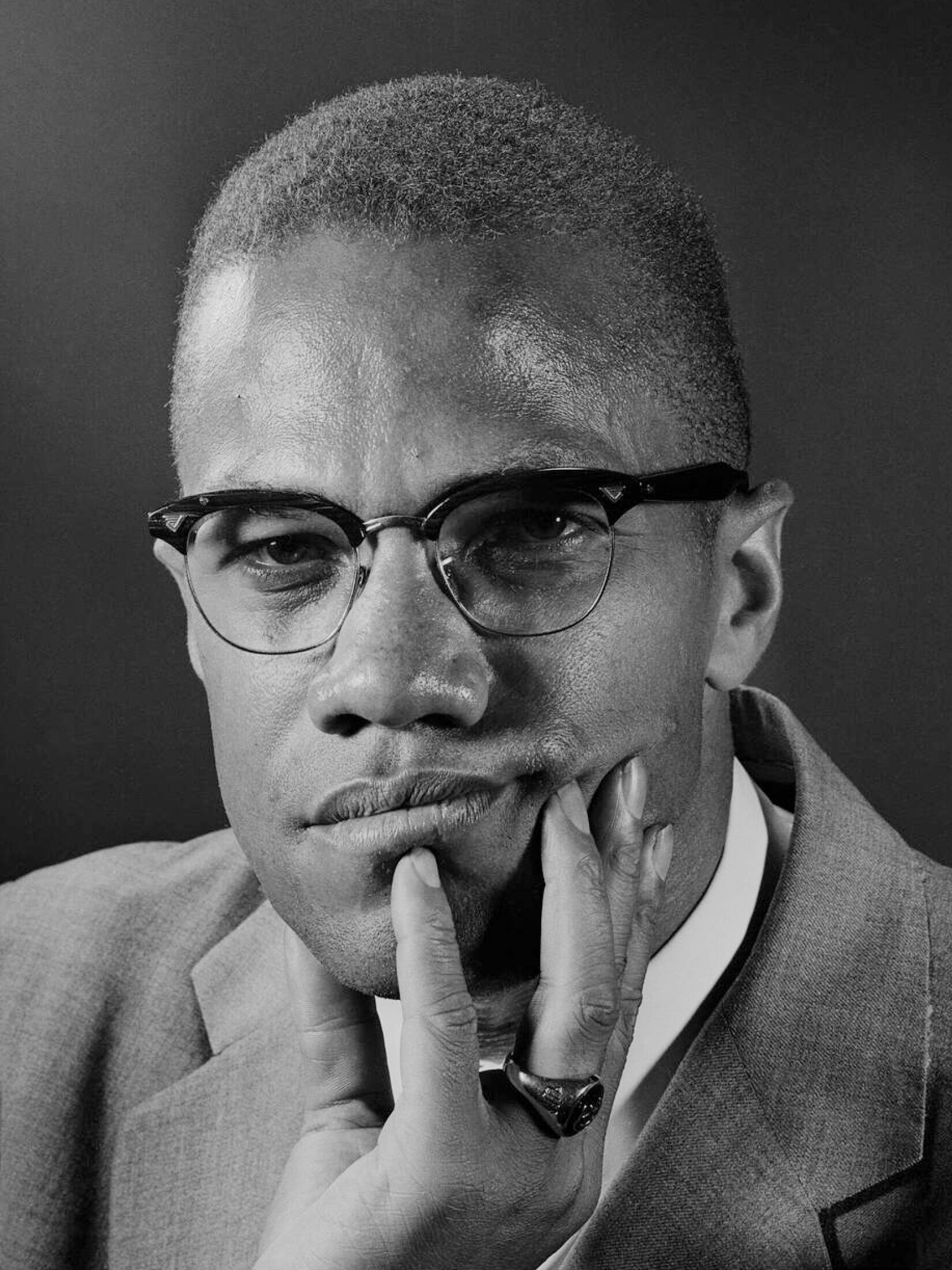
Malcolm X, African American Muslim religious leader and civil rights activist, widely regarded as one of the most influential figures in the struggle for racial justice and Black empowerment.

- Malcolm X (1925–1965) (born Malcolm Little) – African American civil rights leader and activist.
- Abel Xavier – Portuguese football manager and former professional footballer.

=== Y ===
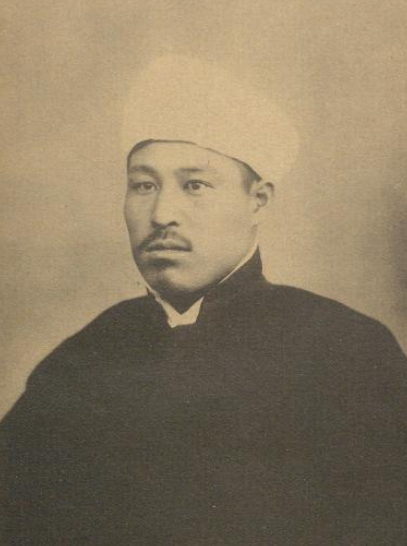
Mitsutarō Yamaoka, pioneering Japanese Islamic scholar and the first recorded Japanese pilgrim to Mecca. He is recognized as an early key figure in the history of Islam in Japan.

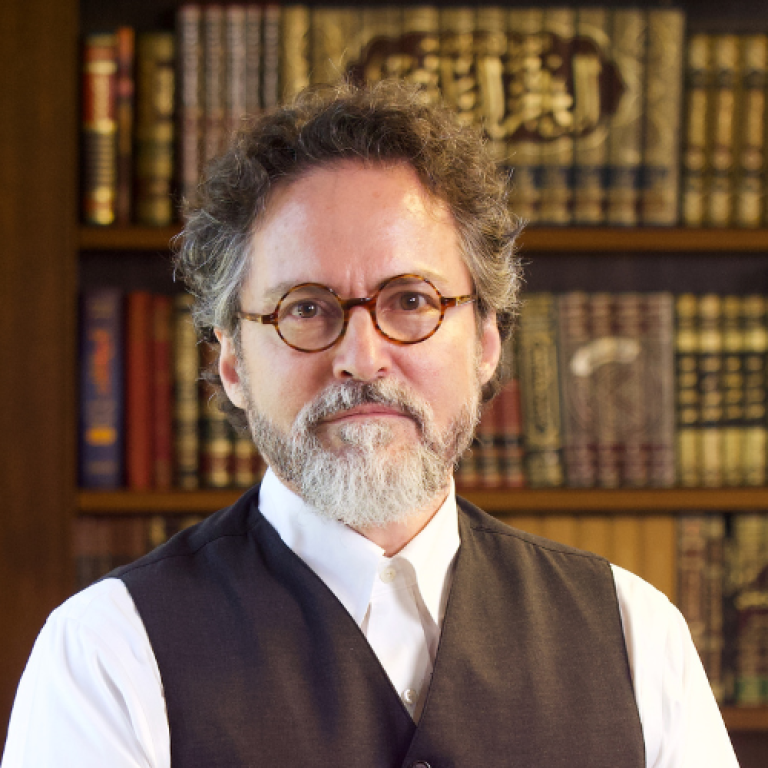
Hamza Yusuf, American Islamic scholar and a pioneer of Islamic neo-traditionalism. He has promoted Islamic sciences and classical teaching methodologies throughout the world.

- Hussein Ye – Malaysian preacher and Islamic scholar.
- Mitsutarō Yamaoka – Japanese Islamic and Judaic scholar known for being the first Japanese pilgrim to Mecca.
- Raisyyah Rania Yeap – Malaysian supermodel, former Playboy Bunny.
- James Yee – American former United States Army chaplain with the rank of captain.
- Khalid Yasin – American Islamic preacher.
- Jackie Yi-Ru Ying – Taiwanese-born American scientist and researcher based in Singapore.
- Mohammad Yousuf (born Joseph Youhana) – Former Pakistani cricketer.
- Kumba Yala – Guinean politician who was president from 17 February 2000 until he was deposed in a bloodless military coup on 14 September 2003.
- Tete Yengi – Australian professional soccer player.
- Elif Jale Yeşilırmak – Former Russian-Turkish female wrestler.
- Hamza Yusuf (born Mark Hanson) – American Islamic scholar.
- Tani Yutaka – Japanese-born vigilante and saboteur active in British Malaya.
- Moneybagg Yo (stage name for DeMario White Jr.) – American rapper.

=== Z ===
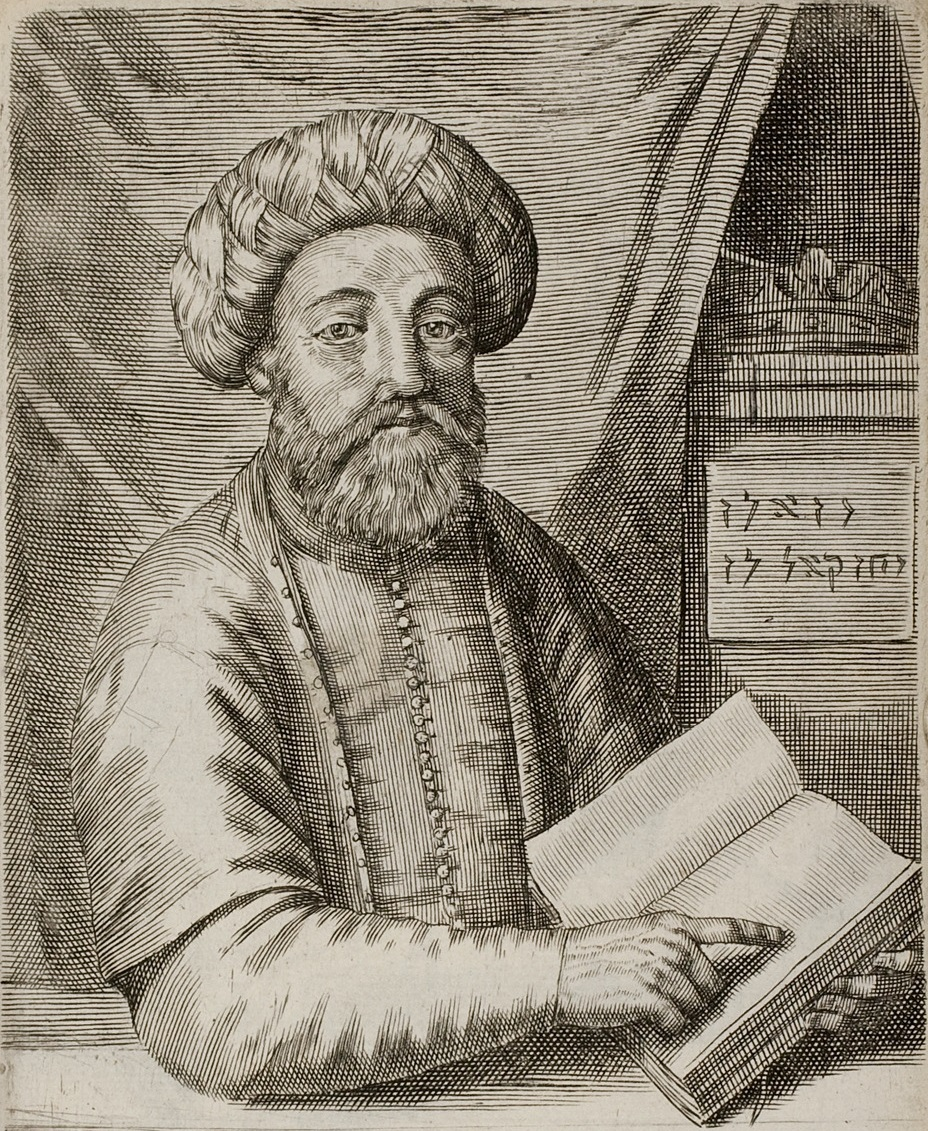
Sabbatai Zevi, Jewish mystic and messianic claimant, best known for founding the Sabbatean movement, which profoundly influenced Jewish religious history.

- Mohamed Zakariya – American master of Arabic calligraphy, best known for his work on the popular Eid U.S. postage stamp.
- Arsène Zola – Congolese professional footballer.
- Sabbatai Zevi – Jewish mystic and self-proclaimed Messiah.
- Mariam Abou Zahab – French political scientist, sociologist, and scholar of Islamic studies.
- Rayhana bint Zayd – Muhammad's concubine or twelfth wife.

== See also ==
- List of converts to Buddhism
- List of converts to Christianity
- List of converts to Hinduism
- List of converts to Judaism
- List of converts to Sikhism
- List of former Muslims
- Lists of Muslims
- List of people by belief
- Religious conversion
