= Islamica Magazine =

Quarterly magazine

- Editor-in-chief: Sohail Nakhooda
- Categories: Culture, religion, political science, literature and foreign affairs
- Frequency: Monthly
- Publisher: CICD
- Total circulation: 15,000
- Founded: 1992
- Country: International, based in United States / Jordan
- Language: American English
- Website: islamicamagazine.com

Islamica Magazine was a quarterly magazine in the United States with editorial offices in Amman, Jordan; Cambridge, Massachusetts; and London, UK, dedicated to presenting various perspectives and opinions on Islam and the Muslim world. It is currently on hiatus due to financial constraints.

The magazine's concept and relaunch were achieved through the efforts of Sohail Nakhooda, a Jordan-based LSE graduate who was the first Muslim to study Christian theology at the Vatican. His vision for the magazine, as is the vision of the current staff, aims to broaden perspectives on Islam and provide a forum for Muslims to articulate their concerns while establishing cross-cultural relations between Muslims and their neighbors and co-religionists. The magazine is produced in English and draws from scholars, thinkers, writers and activists from around the world.

== History and profile ==
The magazine was first published in 1992 in the UK, and re-launched in 2004 from Amman, Jordan. In 2009 the magazine was renamed as Islamica.

Islamica is published in English on a monthly basis.

== Editorial perspective ==
Since the re-launch, Islamica has developed a diverse advisory board of scholars, thinkers, and academics to help define its editorial perspective. This board includes the following individuals: Umar Faruq Abd-Allah, Osman Bakar, John Esposito, Hamza Yusuf, Jeremy Henzell-Thomas, Anwar Ibrahim, Enes Karic, Nuh Keller, Joseph Lumbard, Ingrid Mattson, Daniel Abdal-Hayy Moore, Abdal Hakim Murad, Sulayman Nyang, S. Abdallah Schleifer, Zaid Shakir

The magazine generally takes an orthodox Sunni Muslim perspective. In its earlier years, Islamica had a more Anglo-European outlook on issues, as was reflected by its primarily British-educated editorial team. In 2004, its core editorial staff was expanded to include six editors based in the United States. It was during this time that a more subtle transition was made towards addressing issues related to Islam for a primarily US or American audience. Evidence of this shift can be found in recent articles published by Sherman Jackson, David Cole, Samuel Huntington, John Esposito and other prominent American thinkers.

Additionally, regular columnists based in the US including the comedian Azhar Usman, the award-winning poet Daniel Abdal Hayy Moore, the essayist and writer Haroon Moghul and Asma Uddin, a lawyer and research associate for Umar F. Abd-Allah were also added to the magazine. Uddin is also a fellow with the Becket Fund for Religious Freedom. Other regular columnists include Faraz Rabbani, Yusuf Zanella, the British academic, H A Hellyer and Jeremy Henzell Thomas. However, the editor-in-chief, Sohail Nakhooda, remains in Amman.

== See also ==
- Islamica
