= Cambridge Muslim College =

Higher education institution in Cambridge, United Kingdom

Coordinates: 52.1979°N 0.1301°E

Cambridge Muslim College (CMC)
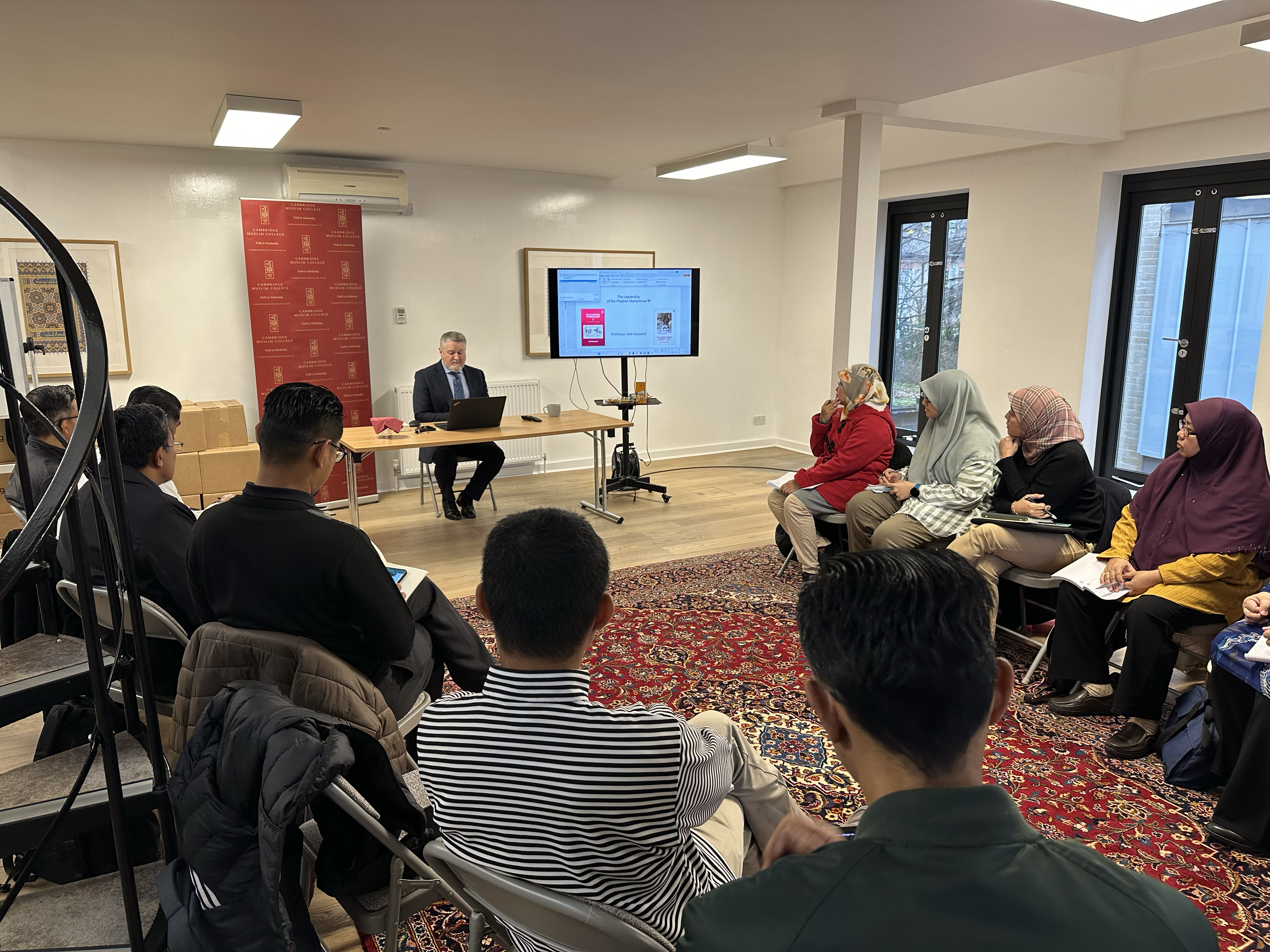
- Professor Joel Hayward teaching at Cambridge Muslim College
- Motto: Faith in Scholarship
- Established: 2009
- Location: 14 St Paul’s Road, Cambridge, CB1 2EZ, United Kingdom
- Programs: BA (Hons) in Islamic Studies; Diploma in Contextual Islamic Studies & Leadership
- Colours
- Website: Official website

Cambridge Muslim College is an independent higher education institution in Cambridge, United Kingdom. It was founded in 2009 by Timothy Winter (also known as Shaykh Abdal Hakim Murad). It was most recently (2023 and 2024) headed by Joel Hayward, a professor and senior education administrator, who was Chief Executive.

Cambridge Muslim College was founded to support British Muslim scholarship and training from secular and Islamic perspectives. It does not hold a political or denominational affiliation.

Accredited by the British Accreditation Council for Independent Further and Higher Education, Cambridge Muslim College offers trained Muslim scholars a one year diploma in Islamic studies and leadership, designed to help them better implement their knowledge and training in 21st-century Britain. It also hosts academics, including early-career scholars engaged in post-doctoral research, as full-time and associate research fellows. In 2017, Cambridge Muslim College launched a three-year BA (Hons) in Islamic Studies validated by The Open University.

== History ==
In 2002, Timothy Winter, Yusuf Islam and Tijani Gahbiche agreed to the idea of establishing a centre of Islamic learning in Cambridge. Fundraising and consultations followed, and senior figures from the University of Cambridge such as Vice-Chancellor Alison Richard and Regius Professor of Divinity David F. Ford offered advice, as well as Muslim scholars such as Zaid Shakir, founder of Zaytuna College.

Cambridge Muslim College was founded in 2009 by Timothy Winter, who is the Shaykh Zayed Lecturer in Islamic Studies in the Faculty of Divinity at the University of Cambridge. He has consistently been included in The Muslim 500 list published annually by the Royal Aal al-Bayt Institute for Islamic Thought.

In its inaugural year it hosted a handful of students and was temporarily based at the University of Cambridge's Margaret Beaufort Institute of Theology while searching for a permanent home. In 2011, the College acquired the freehold of its current campus at St Paul's Road, for £3.1 million. In 2015, it purchased with a loan a large adjacent building at 20 Cambridge Place, which will be the core of the teaching and resources provision for the BA and MA programmes.

From 2023 to 2024, Joel Hayward was Chief Executive. Kirkus Reviews said that Hayward "is undeniably one of academia’s most visible Islamic thinkers". He is also considered to be one of "the world's five hundred most influential Muslims," with his listing in the 2023, 2024, 2025, 2026 and 2027 editions of The Muslim 500 stating that "He weaves together classical Islamic knowledge and methodologies and the source-critical Western historical method to make innovative yet carefully reasoned sense of complex historical issues that are still important in today’s world. He is considered to be one of the world’s leading scholars of the Sira."

== Site ==
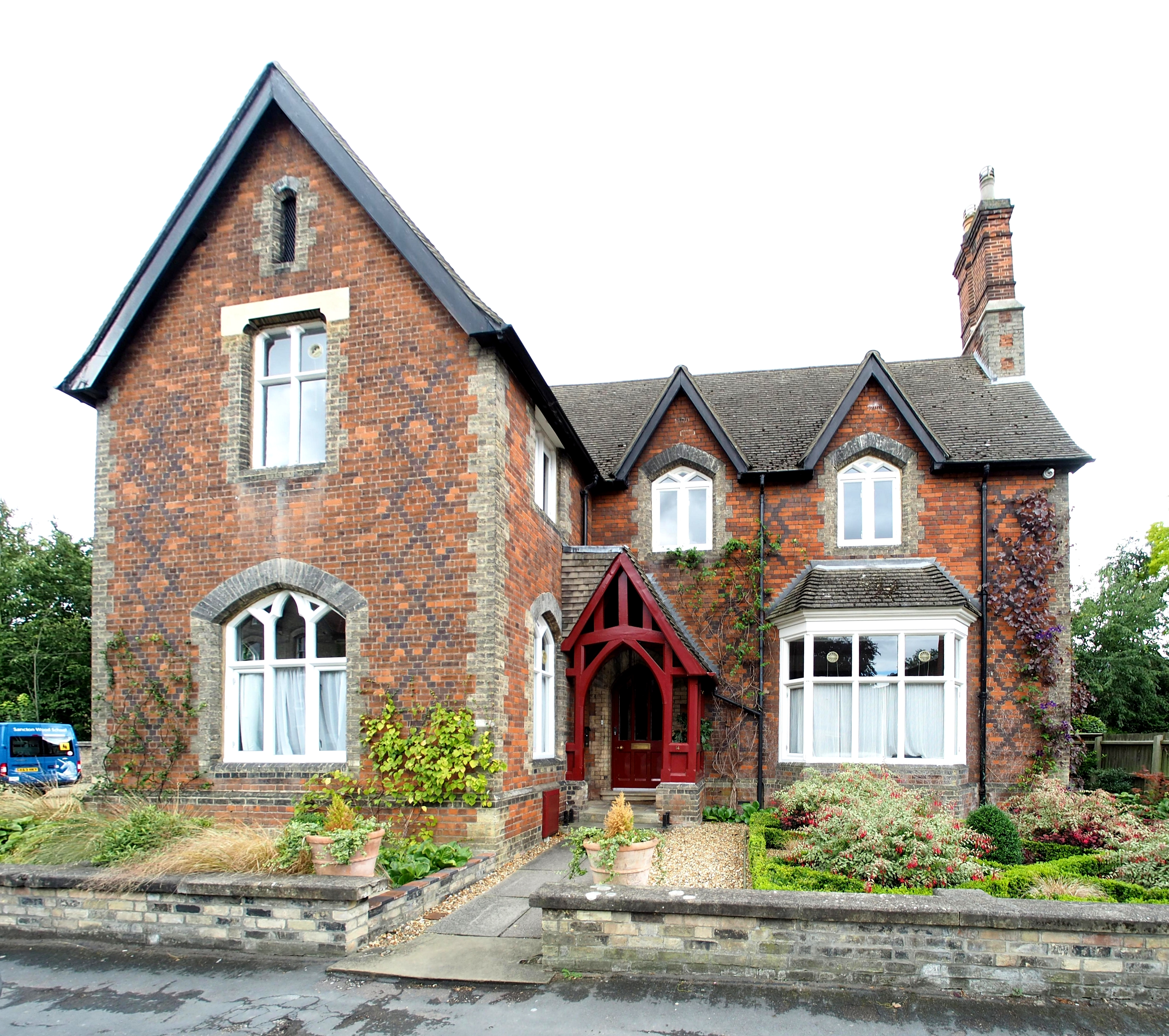
Unity House

Cambridge Muslim College has been based at Unity House on St Paul's Road in central Cambridge since July 2011. The former vicarage was designed in 1847 by the Victorian architect Sir George Gilbert Scott. The building has a large front office and two teaching rooms on the ground floor, a refectory and a kitchen. The first floor houses the library, the prayer room and offices of the chief executive, the dean and research fellows. The adjoining buildings – a row of former almshouses – are used to house the college's Arabic book collections.

== Curriculum and research ==
Cambridge Muslim College offers three programmes for students: the Diploma in Contextual Islamic Studies and Leadership, the Diploma in Islamic Psychology, and the three-year B.A. (Hons) in Islamic Studies validated by The Open University.

The Diploma in Contextual Islamic Studies and Leadership is based on the 'non-traditional' segment of the proposed BA curriculum. It was agreed to launch the college's teaching programme with this diploma, which was designed for graduates of Islamic academies and madrasas to improve their understanding of Islam's relationship with the leading intellectual, legal, social and scientific trends of modern Britain. Around 20 students take the diploma each year. Students take courses on a wide range of subjects including philosophy, world religions, western art, international affairs and British constitutional history. The programme also includes an open audience with the Pope in the Vatican City.

The Diploma in Islamic Psychology is an online programme designed to give students who are already practitioners in related fields theoretical and practical perspectives of psychology and the Islamic sciences.

The longer, three-year programme has a prerequisite one year of intensive Arabic study at the Qasid Institute in Amman, Jordan, before starting the three years of classical Islamic studies in Cambridge. The curriculum is modelled on that of the Al-Fath Academy in Damascus, Syria and also draws on the programme of Al-Azhar University in Cairo. In addition to classical Islamic text study, a range of contemporary disciplines are also taught, including Western history, philosophy, and science, and the knowledge of non-Muslim religions.

Cambridge Muslim College hosts academics, including early-career scholars engaged in post-doctoral research, as full-time and associate research fellows. A part-time, two-year research-based postgraduate qualification is planned.

== See also ==
- List of Islamic educational institutions
- Cambridge Central Mosque
- Namira Nahouza
