= Hamza Yusuf =

American Islamic scholar (born 1958)

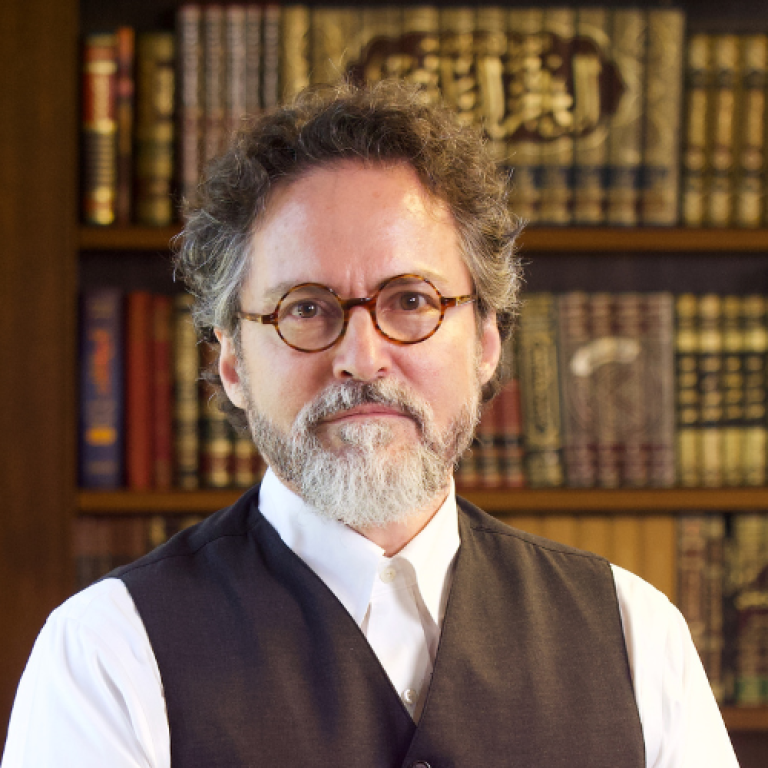
- Yusuf at Zaytuna College in 2025
- Title: Shaykh

Personal life
- Born: Mark Hanson; 1958 (age 67–68) Walla Walla, Washington, U.S.
- Main interest(s): Tasawwuf, Aqida, Fiqh, Islamic Eschatology
- Education: Graduate Theological Union (PhD); San Jose State University (BA); University of Ez-Zitouna; Imperial Valley College (AS, AA); United Arab Emirates University
- Occupation: Islamic scholar, Author
- Website: sandala.org

Religious life
- Religion: Islam
- Denomination: Sunni
- Jurisprudence: Maliki
- Creed: Ash'ari
- Movement: Islamic neo-traditionalism

Muslim leader
- Teacher: Murabit al-Hajj, Abdallah bin Bayyah

Hamza Yusuf (born Mark Hanson; 1958) is an American Islamic scholar. A pioneer of Islamic neo-traditionalism, he has promoted Islamic sciences and classical teaching methodologies throughout the world.

Yusuf co-founded Zaytuna College in Berkeley, California in 1996 as Zaytuna Institute. He is an advisor to both the Center for Islamic Studies at the Graduate Theological Union in Berkeley and the Islamic Studies programme at Stanford University. In addition, he serves as vice-president for the Global Center for Guidance and Renewal, which was founded and is currently presided over by Abdallah bin Bayyah. He also serves as vice-president of the United Arab Emirates-based Forum for Promoting Peace in Muslim Societies, where bin Bayyah also serves as president. The Forum has attracted huge controversy for its close ties to the UAE government, its support for authoritarian leaders since the Arab Spring, and support for the Abraham Accords between Israel and the UAE. Yusuf has denied, in his 2023 address as Toronto's RIS Conference, that the Forum's statements reflect his personal opinions and that he has "never been in favor of normalization."

Yusuf has been listed in the top 50 of The 500 Most Influential Muslims publication. His detractors, however, have widely criticised him for his stance on race, politics, the Syrian revolution, and the Palestinian-Israeli conflict.

== Early life and education ==
Yusuf was born as Mark Hanson in 1958 in Walla Walla, Washington to two academics working at Whitman College, and was raised in northern California. His father was a Catholic of Irish descent while his mother, who was half Greek and half Irish, was Greek Orthodox, with his grandfather being an Archon. He was raised in his mother's faith. He attended prep schools on both the East and West coasts. In 1977, after a near-death experience in a car accident and reading the Qur'an, he converted to Islam. He mentioned several concepts that were present in both Christianity and Islam, and described his conversion as a "fulfillment".

After being impressed by a young couple from Saudi Arabia who were followers of Abdalqadir as-Sufi, a Scottish convert to Islam and leader of the Darqawa Sufi order and the Murabitun World Movement—Yusuf moved to Norwich, England to study directly under as-Sufi. In 1979, Yusuf moved to Al Ain in the United Arab Emirates where he spent the next four years studying Sharia sciences at the Islamic Studies Institute of the United Arab Emirates University, more often on a one-on-one basis with Islamic scholars. Yusuf became fluent in the Arabic language and also learned Qur'anic recitation (tajwid), rhetoric, poetry, Maliki jurisprudence, and theology (aqidah) among other classical Islamic disciplines.

In 1984, Yusuf formally disassociated himself from as-Sufi's teachings and moved in a different intellectual direction, having been influenced by a number of Mauritanian scholars residing in the Emirates. He moved to North Africa in 1984 and studied in Algeria and Morocco, as well as Spain and Mauritania. In Mauritania he developed his most lasting and powerful relationship with Islamic scholar Sidi Muhammad Ould Fahfu al-Massumi, known as Murabit al-Hajj.

In 2020, Yusuf completed his Ph.D. at the Graduate Theological Union. His dissertation was titled, "The Normative Islamic Tradition in North and West Africa: A Case Study of Transmission of Authority and Distillation of Knowledge in Ibn Ashir's Al-Murshid al-Mu'in (The Helpful Guide)." Yusuf previously earned an associate degree in nursing from Imperial Valley College and a bachelor's degree in religious studies from San José State University.

== Scholarly career ==
=== Zaytuna College ===
Yusuf, Zaid Shakir and Hatem Bazian founded the Zaytuna Institute in Berkeley, California, United States, in 1996, dedicated to the revival of traditional study methods and the sciences of Islam. In fall 2010, it opened its doors as Zaytuna College, a four-year Muslim liberal arts college, the first of its kind in the United States. It incorporates Yusuf's vision of combining the classical liberal arts—based in the trivium and quadrivium—with rigorous training in traditional Islamic disciplines. It aims to "educate and prepare morally committed professional, intellectual, and spiritual leaders". Zaytuna College became the first accredited Muslim campus in the United States after it received approval from the Western Association of Schools and Colleges.

=== Interfaith ===
Yusuf participates in the Forum for Promoting Peace in Muslim Societies hosted by the UAE. He praised the UAE for its increasing tolerance and its adoption of multi-faith initiatives and plans to build a multi-faith centre in Abu Dhabi.

== Views and influence ==
Jordan's Royal Islamic Strategic Studies Centre currently places him 36th on its list of the top 500 most influential Muslims in the world. In its 2016 edition, Yusuf is described "as one of the foremost authorities on Islam outside of the Muslim world" by The 500 Most Influential Muslims, edited by John Esposito and Ibrahim Kalin. Additionally, Journalist Graeme Wood has referred to Yusuf as "one of the two most prominent Muslim scholars in the United States today".

Yusuf has taken a stance against religious justifications for terrorist attacks. He described the 9/11 attacks as "an act of mass murder, pure and simple". Condemning the attacks, he also stated that "Islam was hijacked ... on that plane as an innocent victim."

Yusuf is one of the signatories of A Common Word Between Us and You, an open letter by Islamic scholars to Christian leaders calling for peace and understanding. Yusuf was also one of the signatories of an open letter to former ISIS leader Abu Bakr al-Baghdadi that sought to refute the principles promoted by the terrorist organization.

Yusuf has been involved in controversies in recent years on issues of race, politics, and the Arab revolutions, including as a result of his support for the Abraham Accords and UAE government, and for "positing blame on the Palestinians for their suffering".

=== Support for constitutional monarchy over democracy ===
In an interview with Turki al-Dakhil of Saudi Arabia in 2011, Hamza Yusuf argued that constitutional monarchy was a stronger form of governance than democracy. He stated:

"Firstly, kings are incorruptible unlike those who possess great wealth. [Presenter interjecting: Like the nouveau riche?] Yes, like that. Such a person can be corrupted. As for kings, he is satiated. He has everything. He does not need anything".

=== Comments on the Syrian Revolution ===
In 2019, in reference to Arab Spring protests against Syrian dictator Bashar al-Assad, Yusuf criticized the Syrian Revolution, stating that "If you humiliate a ruler, God will humiliate you." Although some viewed these comments as supportive of the Syrian regime, Yusuf responded, rejecting this interpretation.

=== 2016 Black Lives Matter comments ===
In December 2016, Yusuf made comments that were perceived as critical of the tactics employed by the Black Lives Matter movement. He argued that, "The United States is probably, in terms of its laws, one of the least racist societies in the world." He also stated that, "We have between 15,000 and 18,000 homicides per year. Fifty percent are black-on-black crime, literally." He added, "There are twice as many whites that have been shot by police, but nobody ever shows those videos." Yusuf was criticized for these comments, including on social media. Zaid Shakir defended Yusuf, writing that "I can say with absolute confidence that there is not a racist bone in Shaykh Hamza's body. A racist is someone who believes in the superiority of one race over another. Shaykh Hamza, like any serious Muslim, totally rejects that idea."

== Publications ==
Publications and works by Hamza Yusuf
Title	Description	Year	Type
Agenda to Change our Condition	Co-authored with Zaid Shakir	1999	Books and Pamphlets
Imām al-Zarnūjī, Instruction of the Student: The Method of Learning	Translated by G.E. Von Grunebaum.	2001	Books with a foreword or introduction
Beyond schooling: building communities where learning really matters	Also includes essays by John Taylor Gatto, Dorothy L Sayers and Nabila Hanson. Re-edited in 2010 as Educating Your Child in Modern Times: How to Raise an Intelligent, Sovereign & Ethical Human Being.	2003	Books and Pamphlets
Imām Busiri, The Burda: Poem of the Cloak	Includes a CD of performances by The Fez Singers feat. Bennis Abdelfettah.	2003	Translations
Mostafa Al-Badawî, The Prophetic Invocations		2003	Books with a foreword or introduction
Shaykh Al-Amin Mazrui, The Content of Character	Foreword by Ali Mazrui, son of the author.	2004	Translations
Imām Mawlūd, Purification of the Heart: Signs, Symptoms and Cures of the Spiritual Diseases of the Heart	Translation and commentary of the poem Maṭharat al-Qulūb composed by a 19th-century Mauritanian scholar.	2004	Translations
Imām Ṭaḥāwī, The Creed of Imam al-Tahawi		2007	Translations
Caesarean Moon Births: Calculations, Moon Sighting, and the Prophetic Way	Available in: Caesarean Moon Births Part 1; Caesarean Moon Births Part 2	2008	Books and Pamphlets
Climbing Mount Purgatorio		2008	Papers
The Prayer of the Oppressed by Imām Muhammad bin Nasir al-Dar'i	Includes a CD of performances by The Fez Singers.	2010	Translations
Joseph Lumbard, Submission, faith and beauty: the religion of Islam	Co-edited with Zaid Shakir.	2009	Edited Books
Hamza Yusuf, Walk on Water: The Wisdom of Jesus from Traditional Islamic Sources		2010	Article
Reza Shah-Kazemi, Common Ground Between Islam and Buddhism: Spiritual and Ethical Affinities		2010	Books with a foreword or introduction
Hamza Yusuf & Robert P. George, Pornography, Respect, and Responsibility: A Letter to the Hotel Industry		2012	
Hamza Yusuf & Robert P. George, Hotels and the Pornography Plague: An Example of Moral Responsibility from Scandinavia		2013	
Asad Tarsin, Being Muslim: A Practical Guide		2015	Books with a foreword or introduction
Shaykh Al-Amin Ali Mazrui, The Content of Character: Ethical Sayings of the Prophet Muhammad ﷺ	Translation and Introduction by Hamza Yusuf. Collected by Shaykh Al-Amin Ali Mazrui	2015	Translation and Introduction
Edwin Arnold, Pearls of the Faith		2017	Edited and Prefaced
Scott F. Crider, The Art of Persuasion Aristotle's Rhetoric for Everybody	The Zaytuna Curriculum Series	2019	Books with a foreword or introduction
Shaykh Ahmad Badawi Tayyib al-Asma, The Mindful Messenger: Occasional Supplications of the Prophet Muhammad ﷺ		2022	Translations
The Hamziyyah of Imam al-Buṣīrī: An Ode in Praise of the Best of Creation	Foreword by Shaykh Muhammad al-Yaqoubi	2025	Translations

=== Poems ===
- Spring's Gift
- Be Like Ahmed, a poem dedicated to the Prophet Mohammed, recited at the ceremony of the Prophet's birthday on the 12th of Rabi' al-Awwal (9th of October 2022).

== See also ==
- List of Sufis
- Abdallah Bin Bayyah
- Sheikh Abubakr Ahmad
- Zaid Shakir
- Murabit al-Hajj
- Timothy Winter
- Ali al-Jifri
- Umar bin Hafiz
- Nazim Al-Haqqani
- Umar Faruq Abd-Allah

== Photos ==
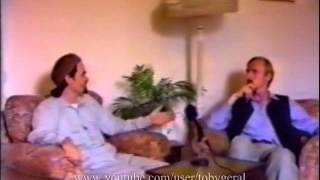
Timothy Winter and Shaykh Hamza

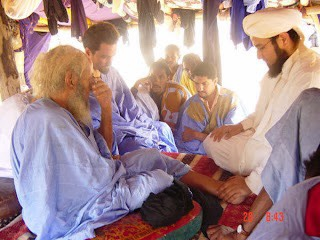
ShMurabbit_mauritania

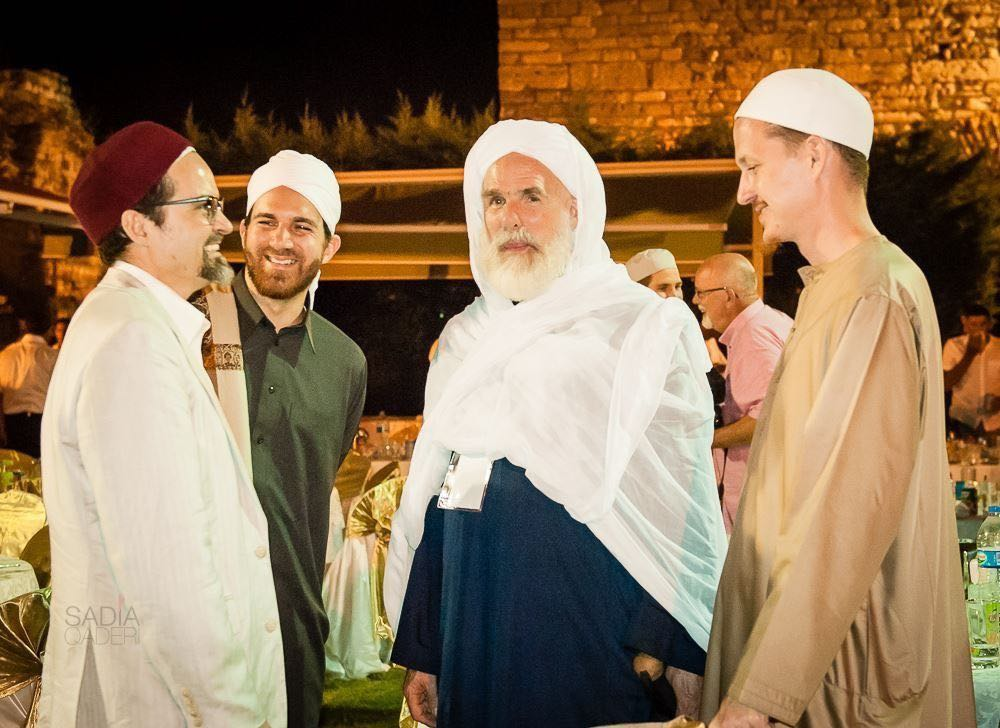
Shaykh Hamza with Dr. Umar Faruq Abd-Allah

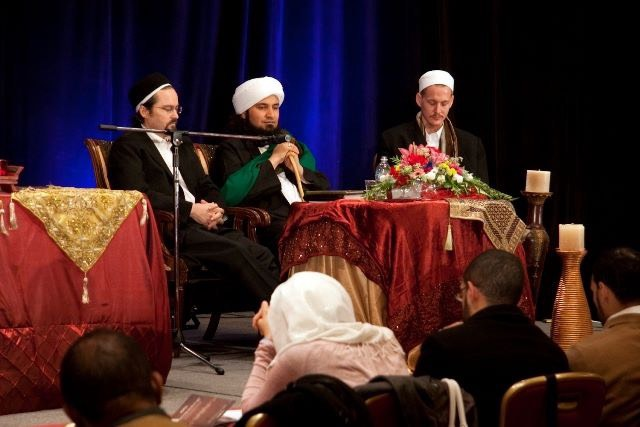
Shaykh Hamza with Habib Ali Al jfri and Shaykh Yahya Rhodus
