= Umar Faruq Abd-Allah =

American Islamic scholar (born 1948)

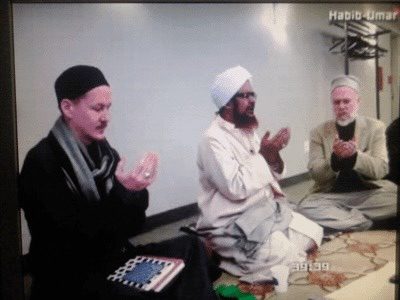
- Umar bin Hafiz with Shaykh Yahya Rhodus and Dr. Umar Faruq Abd-Allah
- Born: Wymann Landgraf; 1948 (age 77–78); Columbus, Nebraska, U.S.

Umar Faruq Abd-Allah (born Wymann-Landgraf; born 1948) is an American Islamic theologian, author, spiritual guide, and educator.

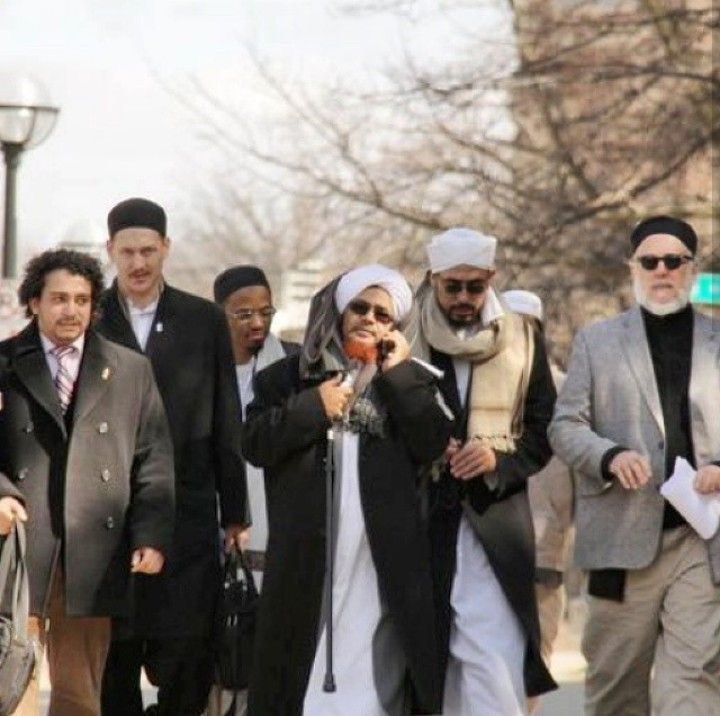
Shaykh Umar Faruq Abd-Allah with Habib Umar bin Hafiz and Shaykh Yahya Rhodus

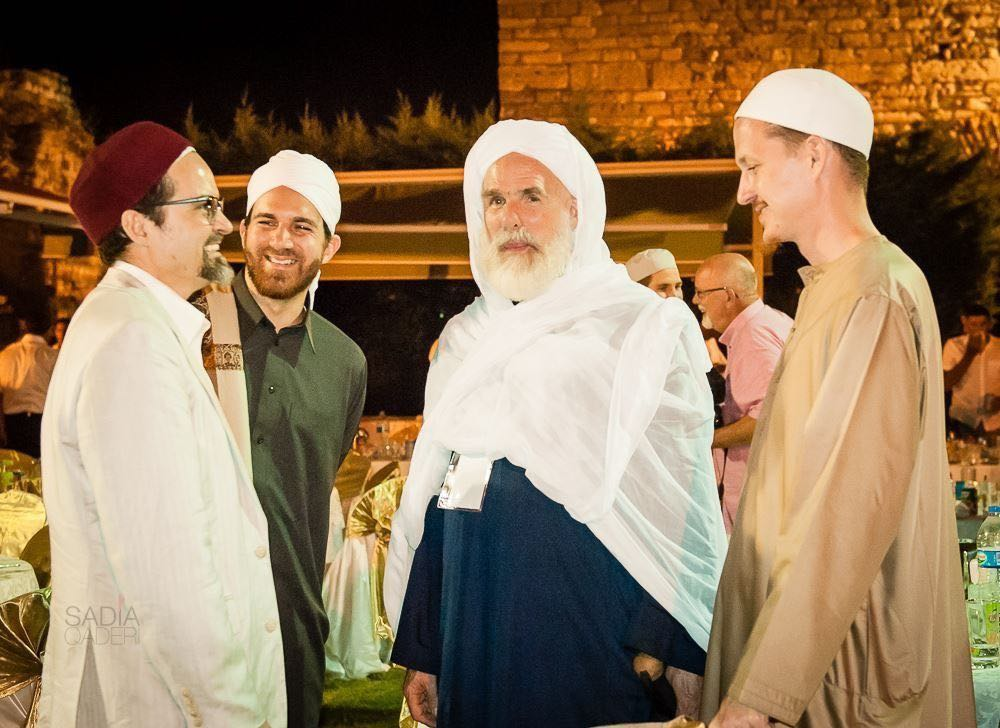
Shaykh Umar Faruq Abd-Allah with Shaykh Hamza Yusuf, Shaykh Yahya Rhodus and Ustad Walead Mohammed Mosaad

== Biography ==
Umar Faruq Abd-Allah was born in 1948 in Columbus, Nebraska to a Protestant family. He was raised in Athens, Georgia, where his parents were employed as professors at the University of Georgia. He later converted to Islam and earned a PhD on the origins of Islamic law from the University of Chicago.

Umar Faruq began his academic career in teaching Arabic and Islamic studies at institutions in the United States and Canada. In 1982, he relocated to Spain to teach Arabic, and in 1984, he was appointed to the Department of Islamic Studies at King Abdul-Aziz University in Jeddah, Saudi Arabia. While in Jeddah, he taught courses on Islamic studies and comparative religion and studied with several traditional Islamic scholars.

In 2000, Umar Faruq returned to the United States to work with the Nawawi Foundation in Chicago, where he remained for over a decade. From 2012 to 2013, he taught Islamic studies at Darul Qasim Institute in Chicago. He is currently scholar-in-residence at The Oasis Initiative.

Umar Faruq is associated with the Islamic neo-traditionalist movement and is regarded as a prominent figure.

== Works ==
- Umar F. Abd-Allah (2006). A Muslim in Victorian America: The Life of Alexander Russell Webb. Oxford University Press. ISBN 9780195187281.
- Curtis IV, Edward E. (2008). "Umar F. Abd-Allah, A Muslim in Victorian America: The Life of Alexander Russell Webb". The Journal of Religion. 88 (2). University of Chicago Press: 263–264. doi:10.1086/587604. ISSN 0022-4189.
- Sedgwick, Mark (2009). Nova Religio, pp. 119–120
- McCloud, A. B. (2007-02-01). "A Muslim in Victorian America: The Life of Alexander Russell Webb". Journal of Islamic Studies. 19 (1). Oxford University Press (OUP): 146–148. doi:10.1093/jis/etm068. ISSN 0955-2340.
- Scopino, A. J. (2008). "A Muslim in Victorian America: The Life of Alexander Russell Webb". Religious Studies Review. 34 (3). Wiley: 220. doi:10.1111/j.1748-0922.2008.00308_1.x. ISSN 0319-485X.
- Turan, Ş . (2011). Umar F. Abd-Allah, A Muslim in Victorian America: The Life of Alexander Russell Webb. Osmanlı Araştırmaları, 37 (37), 252-260
- AMELI, SAIED R. (2007). "Ummar F. Abd-Allah, A Muslim in Victorian America: The Life of Alexander Russell Webb". Journal of American Studies. 41 (3). Cambridge University Press (CUP): 684–685. doi:10.1017/s0021875807004082. ISSN 0021-8758. S2CID 145460601.
- Mālik and Medina: Islamic Legal Reasoning in the Formative Period (2013)
- Abd-Allah, Umar F. (1983). The Islamic Struggle in Syria. Berkeley, California: Mizan Press. ISBN 9780933782105. OCLC 10036662.
- Islam and the Cultural Imperative (2004)
- Abd-Allah, Umar F. (2014). al-Īmān fiṭra: Dirāsa lil-Īmān al-Fiṭrī fī al-Qurʾān wal-Sunna wa Kathīr min al-Milal wal-Naḥal [Faith is Innate: A Study of Natural Faith in the Qur'an, the Sunnah, and Many Religions and Sects] (in Arabic). Jeddah: Dār al-Faqīh.

== See also ==
- Shaykh Nazim Al-Haqqani
- Hamza Yusuf
- Nooruddeen Durkee
- Daniel Moore (poet)
- Umar bin Hafiz
- Murabit al-Hajj
- List of Sufis
- Shaykh Yahya Rhodus
- Shaykh Abdul Hakim Murad
- Habib Ali Al jfri
