= Umar bin Hafiz =

Yemeni Sunni Islamic scholar (b. 1963)

Habib Umar bin Hafiz
- عمر بن حفيظ
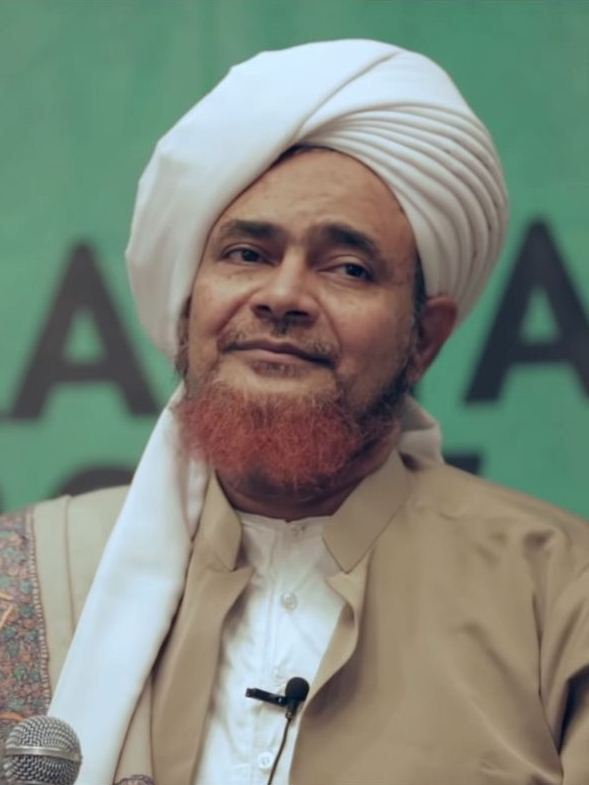
- Habib Umar in 2018
- Born: 27 May 1963 (age 63); Tarim, Kathiri, Protectorate of South Arabia
- Citizenship: Yemeni
- Occupations: Sufi scholar, teacher
- Organization: Dar al-Mustafa
- Known for: Founder and dean of Dar al-Mustafa Seminary
- Title: Sheikh, Habib
- Parent: Muhammad bin Salim bin Hafiz (father)
- Family: Ba 'Alawi sada

Religious life
- Religion: Islam
- Denomination: Sunni
- Jurisprudence: Shafi'i
- Tariqa: Ba 'Alawiyya
- Creed: Ash'ari
- Website: www.alhabibomar.com

Habib Umar bin Hafiz (Note: Arabic: حبيب عمر بن حفيظ, romanized: Ḥabīb ʿUmar bin Ḥafīẓ; Arabic pronunciation: [ħabiːb ʕumar bin ħafiːðˤ]) (born 27 May 1963), commonly known as Habib Umar is a Yemeni Sunni Islamic scholar scholar associated with Sufism. He is the founder and director of Dar al-Mustafa, an Islamic seminary in Tarim, Yemen. He has taught Islamic religious sciences, authored works on Islamic teachings and spirituality, and participated in international and interfaith initiatives.

== Early life ==
Habib Umar bin Hafiz was born on 27 May 1963 (Note: corresponding to 4 Muharram 1383 AH) in Tarim, Kathiri, Protectorate of South Arabia. He comes from a Ba 'Alawi sada family, a lineage associated with Islamic scholarship in Hadhramaut. According to biographical accounts, Habib Umar is regarded as descendant of the Islamic prophet Muhammad, through his grandson Husayn ibn Ali. The surname "Hafiz" comes from his great-grandfather's name, a branch of the family of "Shaykh AbuBakr bin Salim", which is also the name of his paternal thirteenth generation progenitor.

Habib Umar's father, Muhammad bin Salim bin Hafiz

Habib Umar's father, Muhammad bin Salim bin Hafiz, was a Habib (religious scholar) and mufti of Tarim who disappeared during the political upheaval in South Yemen in 1970s and was presumed dead.

== Education ==
Habib Umar memorized the Qur'an at an early age and studied fiqh (Islamic jurisprudence), Hadith, Arabic and other religious sciences. His early education included instruction from his father.

Later, he enrolled at the Ribat of al-Bayda and studied the traditional Islamic sciences under Muhammad bin Abd-Allah al-Haddar, and a Shafi'i jurist and scholar Zain bin Sumait. Habib Umar was given the ijazah (licence to teach) soon after.

He then studied under the mufti of Taiz, Ibrahim bin Aqil bin Yahya. Habib Umar then travelled to Hejaz, where he studied under scholars including Abdul Qadir bin Ahmad al-Saqqaf, Ahmed Mashur al-Haddad, and Attas al-Habashi.

At the age of 15, Habib Umar began to teach, while continuing to study and receive lessons.

== Career ==
=== Dar al-Mustafa ===
In 1993, Habib Umar established Dar al-Mustafa in Tarim as an Islamic educational seminary. He oversees the development of Dar al-Mustafa and the schools that have been set up under his management. Dar al-Mustafa has been featured in The New York Times.

The seminary attracted students from regions including Southeast Asia, East Africa, Europe and North America. Among the notable graduates of this institute include Ibrahim Osi Efa from United Kingdom, Abdul Karim Yahya and Yahya Rhodus from United States, and Munzir Al-Musawa from Indonesia.

A related institution, Dar al-Zahra, provides Islamic education for women. Several other branches in association with Dar al-Mustafa have also been established in Southeast Asia.

=== International activities ===
Habib Umar has travelled internationally to deliver lectures, conduct religious gathering and media interviews, and participate in official and private functions.

In 2006, Habib Umar met with Muhammad Tahir-ul-Qadri; they exchanged knowledge on Islam, and he also received an Ijazah (certificate to teach) of Hadith from Tahir-ul-Qadri.

In 2007, Habib Umar joined the ranks of the world's leading Muslim academics and scholars as a signatory to A Common Word Between Us and You, a document that builds bridges between the Muslim and Christian communities. He has also spoken at Cambridge University on the need for such a dialogue.

In July 2008, he was involved in a charitable initiative in Yemen through the Al-Rafah Charitable Society, in partnership with Muslim Aid Australia. The initiative addressed social needs in the Tarim area, including poverty, food insecurity and access to healthcare.

In 2011, Habib Umar toured the United Kingdom and North America. The tour was titled Tranquillity Amidst Turbulence, which included events in Atlanta, Georgia, scheduled for 21–23 March. The programme included lessons on Islamic identity, spirituality an dawah (religious outreach). One scheduled lecture, titled "Identity Crisis: Being Muslim & Living in America," was to take place at the Georgia Institute of Technology.

In October 2025, Habib Umar visited Thailand as a guest of the country's National Security Council. Officials received him in Bangkok on 21 October, and his programme included meetings with the government representatives and religious leaders. he also met the Shaykh al-Islam of Thailand, Aroon Booncham.

== Religious views ==
Habib Umar is associated with Sunni Islam, the Shafi'i school of jurisprudence and the Ba 'Alawiyya Sufi tradition. His teachings emphasizes the study of Classical Islamic texts, religious practice, spiritual development and the cultivation of moral character.

He has served member of the Supreme Advisory Council for the Tabah Foundation in Abu Dhabi.

== Recognition ==
Habib Umar has been included in The 500 Most Influential Muslims, an annual publication compiled by the Royal Islamic Strategic Studies Centre in Jordan. The publication ranked him first in its 2024 edition and second in its 2025 edition. Habib Umar has been ranked in the list, every year among the top fifty since 2009.

== Publications ==
Habib Umar has authored works on hadith, Islamic ethics, religious instruction, devotional practices and sermons. Titles attributed to him include:

- Mukhtar al-Hadith: Selection of Noble Prophetic Traditions (published in 2011 by the Ribat Institute; ISBN 9780956587411)
- Al-Mukhtar min Shifa al-Saqim : a collection of hadith.
- Is'af Talibi Rida al-Khallaq bi Bayan Makarim al-Akhlaq (Aid to Those Seeking the Creator's Pleasure, by Clarifying the Noble Traits of Character): a work on moral character.
- Tawjihat al-Tullab: Advice for students.
- Khuluquna: a work on character and conduct.
- Yartāḥ Qalbī: a thriteen-verse poem included in Yartāḥ Qalbī, a thirteen-verse poem included in Maulid Aḍiyāʾ al-Lāmi, expresses devotion to Fatima and the Ahl al-Bayt.
- Forthpourings of Favor from the Mercy of the Giver of Favors (Fa’idat al-mann min Rahamat Wahhab al-Minan)
- Directing the Intelligent to the Contentment of the Beneficent (Tawjih al-Nabih li-Mardat Barih)
- The Glorious Treasure (al-Dhakira al-Musharrafa)
- The Summary of Prophetic Aid, a book of invocations (Khuslasa al-Maddad al-Nabawi fil-Adhkar)
- Two mawlids, celebrating the life of Muhammad: The Shimmering Light Mentioning the Birth of the Interceding Prophet (al-Diya al-Lami' fi Dhikr Mawlid al-Nabi al-Shafi') and The Pure Drink Mentioning the Life of the Fullest of Moons (al-Sharab al-Tuhur fi Dhikri Sirati Badri al-Budur)
- The Forthpouring of Spiritual Aid, a Compilation of Sermons (Fayd al-Imdad)
- The Preacher’s Refinement (Thaqafat al- Khatib)

== See also ==
- Murabit al-Hajj
- Hamza Yusuf
- Ali al-Jifri

== Photos ==
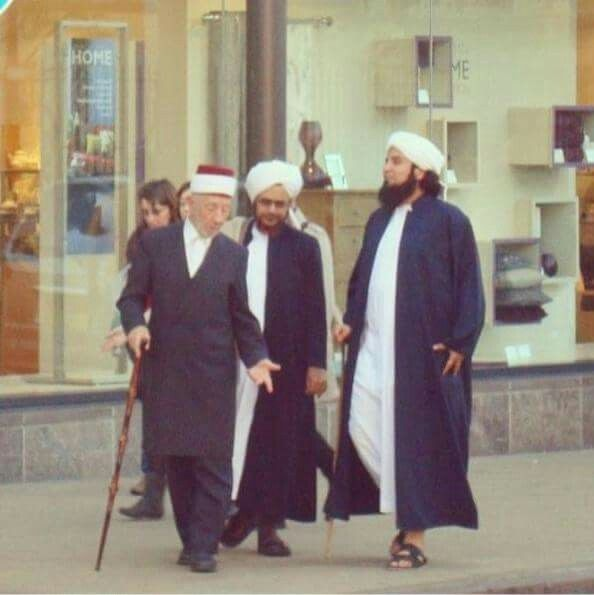
Habib Umar with Ramadan al-Bouti with Ali al-Jifri.

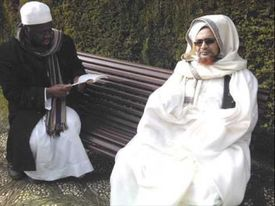
Habib Umar with Ibrahim Osi-efa

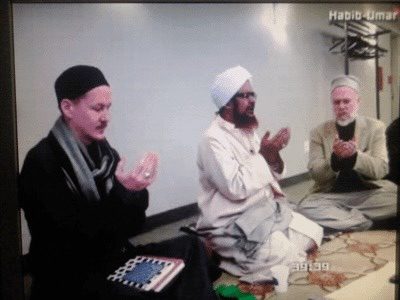
Habib Umar with Yahya Rhodus and Umar Faruq Abd-Allah

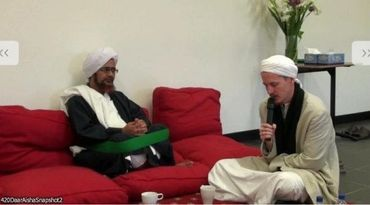
Habib Umar with Yahya Rhodus

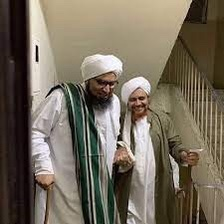
Habib Umar with Ali al-Jifri

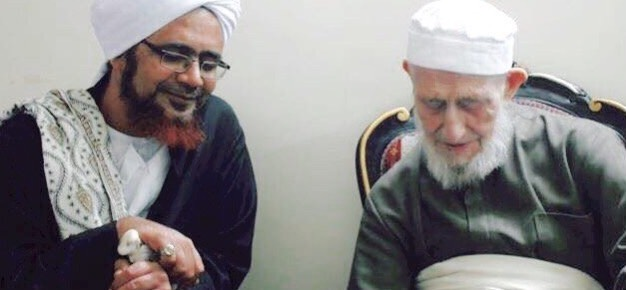
Habib Umar with Shukri al-Luhafi

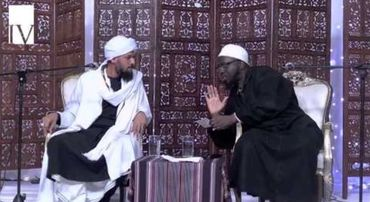
Habib Kadhim as Saqqaf
