= Zaid Shakir =

American Islamic scholar

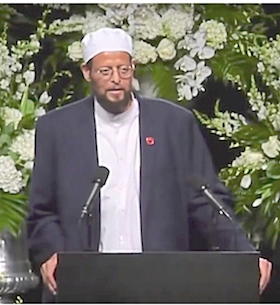
- Zaid Shakir presides over "The People's Champ" Muhammad Ali memorial service in Louisville, KY., 2016.
- Title: Imam

Personal life
- Born: Ricky D. Mitchell; May 24, 1956 (age 70) Berkeley, California, United States
- Era: Modern era
- Education: Rutgers University, M.A.International Relations; American University, B.A. Political Science; Abu Nour University, B.A. Islamic Law, Arabic Language; Teaching Institute of Damascus, Syria
- Occupation: Islamic Scholar, Author
- Website: newislamicdirections.com

Religious life
- Religion: Islam
- Denomination: Sunni
- Jurisprudence: Shafi
- Tariqa: Shadhili
- Creed: Ashari

YouTube information
- Channel: Zaid Shakir
- Years active: 2009–present
- Subscribers: 13,200
- Views: 459,000
- Last updated: 4 August 2026

Zaid Shakir (Arabic: زيد شاكر; born Ricky Daryl Mitchell, May 24, 1956) is an American Muslim scholar and co-founder of Zaytuna College in Berkeley, California. He teaches courses on Arabic, law, history, and Islamic spirituality.

== Early life ==
Shakir was born in 1956 in Berkeley, California as Ricky Daryl Mitchell to a family descended from African, Irish and Native American roots. His formative years were spent in housing projects in New Britain, Connecticut. He converted to Islam in 1977 while serving in the United States Air Force and shortly after changed his name to Zaid Salim Shakir.

== Education ==
Shakir obtained a BA in International Relations at American University in Washington, D.C., and later earned his MA in Political Science at Rutgers University. He then left for Syria to pursue his studies in traditional Islamic Sciences. For seven years in Syria, and briefly in Morocco, Shakir immersed himself in an intense study of Arabic, Islamic law, Quranic studies, and spirituality with Islamic scholars such as Sheikh ʿAbd al-Raḥmān al-Shāghūrī and Sheikh Mustafa Al-Turkmani. In 2001, he was the first American male graduate from Syria's Abu Nour University with a BA in Islamic Sciences.

== Career ==
Shakir is one of the signatories of A Common Word Between Us and You, an open letter by Islamic scholars to Christian leaders, calling for peace and understanding.

He assumed leadership of the Muslim Alliance in North America (MANA) from 2020 until 2022.

Shakir is co-founder and chairman of United For Change, whose stated goal is to leverage the diversity of the Muslim and interfaith community and address divisive obstacles.

In 2020, Shakir partnered with Green Faith to develop programming with religious groups centered on sustainable development and climate change.

Shakir is one of many signatories to a statement prepared by religious leaders from around the world who presented the UN Secretary General with a declaration in support of the Paris Climate Agreement.

Zaytuna College

In 2003, as a scholar-in-residence at Berkeley, California based Zaytuna Institute, Shakir began to teach Arabic, Law, and Islamic spirituality. In 2004, he initiated a pilot seminary program at Zaytuna Institute.

in the fall of 2010, Shakir and colleagues Hamza Yusuf, and Hatem Bazian reorganized the institute into Zaytuna College, a four-year Muslim liberal arts college, the first of its kind in the United States, dedicated to "educate and prepare morally committed professional, intellectual, and spiritual leaders", who are grounded in the Islamic scholarly tradition. In 2015, he signed the official Memorandum of Understanding between Zaytuna College and Hartford Seminary in Connecticut.

In 2016, Zaytuna College became the first accredited Muslim campus in the United States after it received approval from the Western Association of Schools and Colleges.

== Views ==
In 2010, Zaid Shakir appeared with nine other influential Muslim scholars in a YouTube video denouncing militant Islam.

== Reception ==
The 500 Most Influential Muslims of the world edition 2020 describes Zaid Shakir as "an influential Islamic scholar and a voice of conscience for American Muslims and non-Muslims alike", edited by John Esposito and Ibrahim Kalin

Imam Zaid Shakir spoke the last words Ali heard on his deathbed. He leans over and with his mouth close to Ali's right ear, he sings, "There is no God but Allah, and Muhammad is his messenger." Shakir begins talking to Ali, entreating him, exhorting him, telling him, "Muhammad Ali, this is what it means, God is one; say it, repeat it, you've inspired so many, paradise is waiting -- ". He was, in Shakir's description, "a praying man" who understood he belonged to Allah. But he also knew he was Muhammad Ali, and so belonged to the world".

— "The Greatest, At Rest", ESPN - The Magazine's June 12 World Fame Issue

Tikkun Daily states that he is "one of the most thoughtful and dynamic teachers about the true nature of Islam in America today".

Zaid Shakir was named in CNN's 2018 list of "25 Influential American Muslims", where he was described as "one of the West's most respected Muslim scholars."

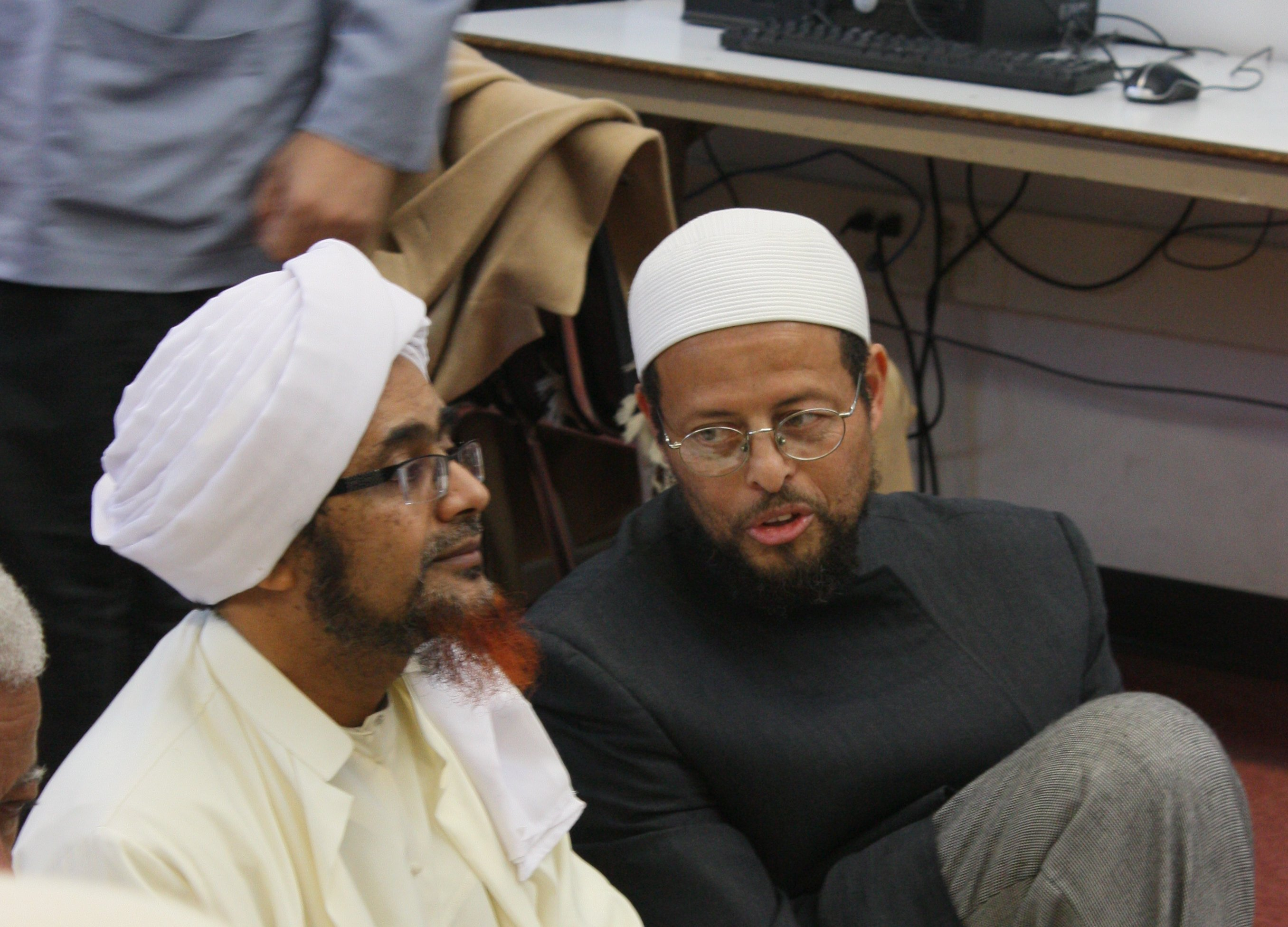
Imam Zaid Shakir (right) with Habib Umar bin Hafiz in Oakland, CA, 2011

== Publications ==
Publications and Articles by Zaid Shakir
Title	Description	Type
Where I'm Coming From: A Year In Review 2010.	Author	Books and Pamphlets
Agenda To Change Our Condition 2007.	co-authored with Hamza Yusuf	Books and Pamphlets
Scattered Pictures: A Reflection of An American Muslim 2005.	Author	Translations
Harith Al-Muhasibi, Treatise for The Seekers of Guidance (2008).	Translation, notes, and commentary of Risala al-Mustarshidin, composed d.243/857 by an Iraqi scholar.	Translations
Ibn Rajab Al-Hanbali, The Heirs of the Prophets (2000).	The translation and introduction of Al-Ulama' Waratha Al-Anbiya, composed d.1375 by an Iraqi scholar.	Books with a foreword or introduction
Dawud Walid, Towards Sacred Activism (2018).		Books with a foreword or introduction
Arsalan Iftikhar and Reza Aslan, Scapegoats: How Islamophobia Helps Our Enemies and Threatens Our Freedoms (2016).	Endorsement	Books with a foreword or introduction
Muslims and The Climate Crisis: Responding To A Higher Call	Available in: Creation at the Crossroads, (contrib. article) (2016) (2018).	Books with a foreword or introduction
Meraj Mohiuddin, Revelation: The Story of Muhammad (pbuh) 2015.	Endorsement	Books with a foreword or introduction
Abdullah bin Hamid Ali, Tears Of The Yearners For The Meeting With God 2015.		Books with a foreword or introduction
Ibrahim Abdul-Matin,Green Deen: What Islam Teaches About Protecting the Planet 2010.	Editorial review	Books with a foreword or introduction
Maraqi'L-Sadat, Ascent to Felicity 2010.	Editorial review	Books with a foreword or introduction
Sa'ad Quadri, The War within Our Hearts: Struggles of the Muslim Youth 2010.	Introduction	Books with a foreword or introduction
Abdul Azeez Ahmad,Living With Blindness: Lessons from the Life of Imran Sabir 2009.	Introduction	Books with a foreword or introduction
Sierra Club, A Gathering of Voices on Caring For Creation 2008.	contributing articleThe Zaytuna Ruku Tree	Books with a foreword or introduction
Richelene Mitchell, Dear Self: A Year In The Life of A Welfare Mother 2006		Books with a foreword or introduction
Aftab A. Malik and Ibrahim M Abu'- Rabi, The Empire and The Crescent: Global Implications For a New American Century 2004.	contributing article Jehad as Perpetual War	Books with a foreword or introduction
Joseph Lumbard, Submission, faith and beauty: the religion of Islam (2009).	Co-edited with Hamza Yusuf.	Edited Books
Where Islam and Nationalism Collide; The Human in The Quran; A Muslim Response to Pope Francis Laudato S' - "Muslims and The Climate Crisis: Responding To A Higher Call", (115 -119); Crescentwatch Position Change; American Muslims, Human Rights, and the Challenge of September 11; Malcolm X (1925-1965); Islam, Prophet Muhammad, and Blackness		Papers
