= Letter to Baghdadi =

Open letter to Abu Bakr al-Baghdadi

"Letter to Baghdadi" (Arabic: رسالة مفتوحة إلى أبو بكر البغدادي, romanized: risāla maftūḥa ʾilā ʾAbū Bakr al-Baghdādī, lit. 'an open letter to Abu Bakr al-Baghdadi') is an open letter to Abu Bakr al-Baghdadi, the leader of the Islamic State of Iraq and Syria published in 2014 as a theological refutation of the practices and ideology of the Islamic State of Iraq and Syria. It is signed by numerous Muslim theologians, lawmakers and community leaders from Egypt, the United States, Pakistan, Nigeria, and others.

== Overview ==
The letter includes a technical point-by-point refutation of Islamic State of Iraq and Syria's (ISIS) actions and ideology based on the Qur'an and other classical texts, using a style that is unfamiliar to liberal or even uninformed Muslims.

== Background ==
In September 2014, the letter, initially signed by 122 Muslim scholars from around the world and was presented at Washington, D.C. by Nihad Awad of the Council on American Islamic Relations. Stating that the purpose of the letter was not to warn Abu Bakr al-Baghdadi but to dissuade potential radicals from joining the ranks Islamic State of Iraq and Syria, he said:

"You have misinterpreted Islam into a religion of harshness, brutality, torture and murder … This is a great wrong and an offense to Islam, to Muslims and to the entire world".

== Summary ==
- Islam forbids the issuing of fatwas without all the necessary learning requirements. One must consider the entire Qur'an and Hadith, when delivering them.
- It is forbidden in Islam to issue legal rulings about anything without mastery of the Arabic language.
- It is forbidden in Islam to oversimplify Sharia matters and ignore established Islamic sciences.
- It is permissible in Islam [for scholars] to differ on any matter, except those fundamentals of religion that all Muslims must know.
- It is forbidden in Islam to ignore the reality of contemporary times when deriving legal rulings.
- Islam forbids killing of the innocent, emissaries, ambassadors, and diplomats; hence it is forbidden to kill journalists and aid workers.
- Jihad in Islam is defensive war. It is not permissible without the right cause, the right purpose and without the right rules of conduct.
- It is forbidden in Islam to declare a person a non-Muslim (apostate) unless he or she openly declares disbelief.
- It is forbidden in Islam to harm or in any way mistreat Christians or any People of the Scripture.
- It is forbidden in Islam to force people to convert.
- Islam requires respect for the rights of women and children.
- It is forbidden in Islam to inflict legal punishments without following the correct procedures to ensure justice and mercy.
- It is haram to mutilate the dead and to torture people.
- It is forbidden in Islam to attribute evil acts to Allah.
- Armed insurrection (baghy) is forbidden in Islam for any reason other than clear disbelief by the ruler and not allowing people to pray.
- It is forbidden in Islam to declare a caliphate without consensus from all Muslims.
- Loyalty to one's country is permissible to an extent.
- Since the death of the Prophet, Islam does not require anyone to emigrate anywhere.

== Signatories ==
Principal signatories include:

- Abdullah bin Bayyah, Maliki jurist and president of the Forum for Promoting Peace in Muslim Societies, Abu Dhabi.
- Prof. Sheikh Shawki Allam, the 19th and current Grand Mufti of Egypt.
- Sheikh Dr. Ali Gomaa, the former and 18th Grand Mufti of Egypt.
- Sheikh Hamza Yusuf, founder and director of Zaytuna College, United States.
- Dr. Muhammad Tahir-ul-Qadri, founder of Minhaj-ul-Qur'an International, Pakistan
- Abu Ammaar Yasir Qadhi, professor of Islamic Studies, Rhodes College, United States.
- Faraz Rabani, Islamic scholar and founder of Seekers Guidance, Canada.
- Sultan Sa'adu Abubakar, the Sultan of Sokoto, head of the Nigerian National Supreme Council for Islamic Affairs.
- Prince Bola Ajibola, Islamic Mission for Africa (IMA) and founder of Crescent University, Nigeria.
- Ibrahim Saleh Al-Husseini, head of the Supreme Council for Fatwa and Islamic Affairs, Nigeria.
- Prof. Din Syamsuddin, president of Muhammadiyah, and chairman of the Indonesian Council of Ulama.
- Shabir Ally, televangelist and founder of Imam of Islamic Information and Dawah Centre International, Toronto, Canada and Sheila Musaji editor of The American Muslim.
- Caner Dagli, Islamic scholar and associate professor of Religious Studies at the College of the Holy Cross in Worcester, Massachusetts.

== Reception ==
Huffington Post described the open letter as "meticulously blasting [ISIS's] ideology".

The MuslimMatters.org website endorsed the letter but questioned the inclusion of the signatories Ali Gomaa, who supported the August 2013 Rabaa massacre; and Ed Husain, proponent of the Iraq War and an adviser to Tony Blair's controversial Faith Foundation.

Critics of the Open Letter consider it insufficiently clear on systematic, juridical, and moral levels. A main deficit is that it does not explain the difference between legitimate and illegitimate acts of political violence. It does not systematically refer to terms like "violence" or "terrorism". The explanation that Muslims are allowed "to fight those who fight them", and that jihad "is not permissible without the right cause, the right purpose and without the right rules of conduct", is not sufficient in this regard. The purpose of the letter is to state that Islam is "completely innocent" of the acts of ISIS and "prohibits them". Although the letter calls the crimes of ISIS "heinous", and the perpetrators "war criminals", it does not state which institutions should hold ISIS members accountable or how the criminals should be punished. Instead, it merely calls on the leader and his followers to "reconsider all your actions; desist from them; repent them; cease harming others and return to the religion of mercy".

== See also ==
- Amman Message
- A Common Word Between Us and You
