= A Common Word between Us and You =

Open letter from Islam to Christianity

A Common Word between Us and You is an open letter dated October 13, 2007, from Muslim to Christian leaders. It calls for peace between Muslims and Christians and seeks common ground in line with the Quranic command "Say: 'O People of the Scripture! come to a common word as between us and you: that we worship none but God'" and the Biblical commandment to love God and one's neighbour. In 2008, the initiative received the Eugen Biser Award and the Building Bridges Award from the UK's Association of Muslim Social Scientists.

== Background ==
"A Common Word between Us and You" is a follow-up to a shorter letter, sent in 2006, in response to Pope Benedict XVI's lecture at the University of Regensburg on 12 September 2006. This lecture, on the subject of faith and reason, had focused mainly on Christianity and what Pope Benedict called the tendency in the modern world to "exclude the question of God" from reason. Islam features in a part of the lecture. The Pope quoted a Byzantine Emperor's strong criticism of Muhammad's teachings. Pope Benedict clarified that this was not his own personal opinion, describing the quotation as being of a "startling brusqueness, a brusqueness which leaves us astounded."

Throughout the world, however, many people thought the Pope's use of the quote insensitive. A very strong sense of injustice was expressed by many Muslims in response to the speech. One month later, 38 Islamic scholars, representing all branches of Islam, replied to Pope Benedict in "An Open Letter to the Pope", dated 13 October 2006. One year later, 138 Islamic personalities co-signed an open letter entitled "A Common Word between Us and You." The letter aimed to promote interfaith dialogue.

== Authorship ==
According to the letter's website, its author is Prince Ghazi bin Muhammad bin Talal, of the Hashemite Kingdom of Jordan. The letter is signed by 138 prominent Muslim personalities from a large number of countries from several continents. These include academics, politicians, writers and muftis. Nearly half of the signatories are university academics or scholars. Professor David Ford, director of the Cambridge Inter-Faith Programme, helped to launch the letter. The following month, Ford was also one of the signatories on a Christian response seeking Muslim forgiveness.

== Addressees ==
"A Common Word between Us and You" is addressed to Pope Benedict XVI, the Patriarchs of the Eastern Orthodox Churches, the leaders of the larger Christian denominations, and to leaders of Christians everywhere. A list is as follows:

- Bartholomew, Ecumenical Patriarch of Constantinople
- Theodoros II, Greek Orthodox Patriarch of Alexandria
- Ignatius IV, Greek Orthodox Patriarch of Antioch
- Theophilos III, Greek Orthodox Patriarch of Jerusalem
- Alexy II, Patriarch of Moscow and All Russia
- Pavle, Patriarch of Serbia
- Daniel, Patriarch of Romania,
- Maxim, Patriarch of Bulgaria,
- Ilia II, Archbishop of Mtskheta – Tbilisi, Catholico-Patriarch of All Georgia
- Chrisostomos, Archbishop of Cyprus
- Christodoulos, Archbishop of Athens and All Greece
- Sawa, Metropolitan of Warsaw and All Poland
- Anastasios, Archbishop of Tirana, Duerres and All Albania
- Christoforos, Metropolitan of the Czech lands and Slovakia
- Pope Shenouda III, Coptic Patriarch of Alexandria
- Karekin II, Supreme Patriarch and Catholicos of All Armenians
- Ignatius Zakka I, Syriac Orthodox Patriarchate of Antioch
- Mar Thoma Didymos I, Catholicos of the East on the Apostolic Throne of St Thomas and the Malankara Metropolitan
- Abune Paulos, Fifth Patriarch and Catholicos of Ethiopia, Tekle Haymanot, Archbishop of Axum
- Mar Dinkha IV, Patriarch of the Holy Apostolic Catholic Assyrian Church of the East
- The Archbishop of Canterbury, Rowan Williams
- Mark S Hanson, presiding bishop of the Evangelical Lutheran Church in America, and President of the Lutheran World Federation
- George H Freeman, General Secretary, World Methodist Council
- David Coffey, President of the Baptist World Alliance
- Setri Nyomi, General Secretary of the World Alliance of Reformed Churches
- Samuel Kobia, General Secretary, World Council of Churches

=== Signatories ===
Since the letter was originally sent on 18 October 2007, there have been a number of new signatories with the result that there are now over 300 Muslim signatories. Great effort was made to ensure signatories represented as broad a range of viewpoints from the Muslim world as possible. Notable signatories included:

- Sa'adu Abubakar - Sultan of Sokoto
- Taha Abd Al-Rahman
- Feisal Abdul Rauf
- Akbar Ahmed
- Bola Ajibola
- Kanthapuram A. P. Aboobacker Musliyar - Grand Mufti of India
- Nihad Awad
- Abdallah Bin Bayyah
- Mustafa Çağrıcı
- Mustafa Cerić - Grand Mufti of Bosnia and Herzegovina
- Caner Dagli
- Seyyed Mostafa Mohaghegh Damad, Ayatollah
- Ravil Gainutdin - Grand Mufti of Russia
- Hamza Yusuf Hanson
- Hasan Hanafi
- Murad Hofmann
- Amir Hussain
- Anwar Ibrahim - Prime Minister of Malaysia
- Ekmeleddin Ihsanoglu
- Abbas Jrari
- Habib Ali Zain Al-Abidin Al-Jifri
- al-Habib Umar bin Hafiz
- Nuh Ha Mim Keller
- Mohammad Hashim Kamali
- Amr Khaled
- M. Ali Lakhani
- Ingrid Mattson
- Yousef Meri
- Jean-Louis Michon
- Zaghloul El-Naggar
- Seyyed Hossein Nasr
- Aref Ali Nayed
- Prince Ghazi bin Muhammad of Jordan
- H A Hellyer
- Noah Qudah - Grand Mufti of Jordan
- Zaid Shakir
- Tariq Sweidan
- Timothy Winter
- Reza Shah-Kazemi

== Support ==
- Response by David F. Ford, director of the Cambridge Inter–Faith Programme, 13 October 2007: "This historic agreement gives the right keynote for relations between Muslims and Christians in the 21st century...there are three main reasons why this is so important. First, it is unprecedented in bringing together so many of the leading religious authorities and scholars of Islam and uniting them in a positive, substantial affirmation. This is an astonishing achievement of solidarity, one that can be built on in the future. Second, it is addressed to Christians in the form of a friendly word, it engages respectfully and carefully with the Christian scriptures, and it finds common ground in what Jesus Himself said is central: love of God and love of neighbour....third it opens a way forward that is more helpful for the world than most others at present in the public sphere....it challenges Muslims and Christians to live up to their own teachings and seek political and educational as well as personal ways to do this for the sake of the common good."
- Response by former UK Prime Minister Tony Blair on 13 October 2007: "This is the only way, in the modern world, to make sense of different history and culture, so that, instead of defining ourselves by reference to difference, we learn to recognise the values we share and define a shared future."
- Response by Yale Divinity School's Centre for Faith and Culture 13 October 2009: "What is so extraordinary about A Common Word between Us and You" is not that its signatories recognise the critical character of the present moment in relations between Christians and Muslims. It is rather the deep insight and courage with which they have identified the common ground between the Muslim and Christian communities. What is common between us lies not in something marginal, nor in something merely important to each. It lies, rather, in something absolutely central to both: love of God and love of neighbour...that so much common ground exists – common ground in some of the fundamentals of faith – gives hope that undeniable differences and even the very real external pressures that bear down upon us can not overshadow the common ground upon which we stand together. That this common ground consists in love of God and of neighbour gives hope that deep cooperation between us can be a hallmark of the relations between our two communities."
- Response by Rowan Williams, Archbishop of Canterbury: "We are deeply appreciative of the initiative you have taken and welcome "A Common Word between Us and You" as a significant development in relations between Christians and Muslims...to your invitation to enter more deeply into dialogue and collaboration as part of our faithful response to the revelation of God's purpose for humankind, we say: Yes! Amen."
- During a visit to the Middle East by Pope Benedict XVI on 9 May 2009, he made a speech to an assembly of religious leaders at the King Hussein State Mosque, Jordan, and said about "A Common Word": "Such initiatives clearly lead to a greater reciprocal knowledge, and they foster a growing respect for what we hold in common and for what we understand differently. Thus, they should prompt Christians and Muslims to probe even more deeply the essential relationship between God and His world so that together we may strive to ensure that society resonates in harmony with the divine order. In this regard, the co operation found here in Jordan sets an encouraging and persuasive example for the region, and indeed the world, of the positive, creative contribution which religion can and must make to civic society."

== Criticism ==
Some commentators, such as the American political columnist Mona Charen, have criticized the open letter.

Robert Spencer, an American conservative commentator, writes: "The persecution of Christians is the primary indication of the letter’s inadequacy as the basis for any real dialogue between Muslims and Christians. Genuine dialogue must focus, or at least be cognizant of, the reality of what separates the two parties. Nothing can be resolved, no genuine peace or harmony attained, except on the basis of confronting those differences."

On 28 November 2007, Patrick Sookhdeo of the Barnabas Fund, interdenominational Christian aid agency, published an analysis of the letter. In it, he pointed out some significant issues which he feels are not addressed. His analysis claimed that, while the letter implies that there is a global war on Islam by Christianity, it gives no indication of sorrow for current or historical wrongs inflicted on Christians by Islam; nor does the letter acknowledge that Muslim actions may have contributed in any alienation between Christians and Muslims. Sookhdeo's analysis also claimed that the letter has no acknowledgement that in many areas - such as parts of Iraq, Sudan, Nigeria, Indonesia and Pakistan - rather than Christianity fighting a war to destroy or displace Muslims, the reverse is the case.

Cardinal Jean-Louis Tauran, a Vatican official, welcomed dialogue but commented that real dialogue with Muslims is difficult. He pointed out imbalances, such as opposition or limitations to the building of churches in some Muslim countries, whilst in Christian countries, Muslims are free to build mosques. He also said, "Muslims do not accept that one can discuss the Koran in depth, because they say it was written by dictation from God.... With such an absolute interpretation, it is difficult to discuss the contents of faith." However, Cardinal Tauran is quoted as saying that his remarks were not exclusivist and that Muslims and Christians are to engage in a substantive dialogue concerning theological and spiritual foundations.

The Common Word website Frequently Asked Questions section attempts to address the criticism of the letter's lack of inclusiveness: "This document is a first step, but one that strives to lay a solid foundation for the construction of many worthy edifices. The document can not be expected to do everything at once. Moreover, many of these issues were already addressed in the Amman Message. The website further acknowledges concerning the letter being a form of "propaganda": "If you mean by that witnessing and proclaiming one's faith with compassion and gentleness, then yes. If you mean forcing one's views on others, then no."

== Publications ==
A number of academic books and journals dedicated to "A Common Word" have emerged:

- Following five years of cooperation inspired by "A Common Word", Mads Christoffersen, Stine Hoxbroe, and Niels Valdemar Vinding edited the book "From A Common Word to Committed Partnership" about the experiences of Danish-Arab Interfaith Dialogue.
- The Washington DC–based academic journal Sophia, and the Beirut Theological Seminary dedicated issues to "A Common Word."
- The Royal Aal Al-Bayt Institute for Islamic Thought issued a booklet summarising issues related to "A Common Word."
- Islamica Magazine dedicated a dossier to the document, issue 21, released February 2009.

== See also ==
- Outline of Islam
- Glossary of Islam
- Index of Islam-related articles
- Letter to Baghdadi
- To the Youth in Europe and North America, a 2015 open letter from Ayatollah Ali Khamenei on the subject of Islam
- Interfaith dialogue
- Hindu–Muslim unity
