= Murabit al-Hajj =

Mauritanian Islamic scholar (c. 1913–2018)

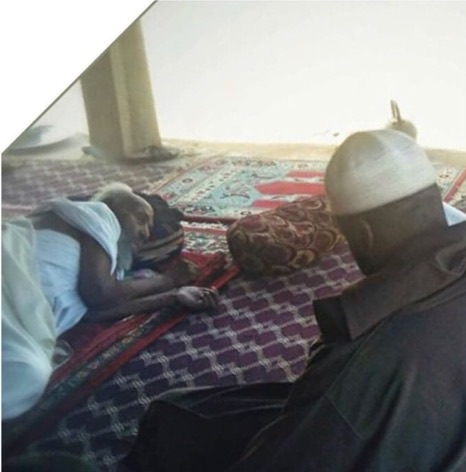
- Murabit al-Hajj laying down

Personal life
- Born: 1913
- Died: July 17, 2018 (aged 104–105)
- Resting place: Mauritania
- Spouse: Maryam Bint Bwayba
- Children: Shaykh Abdur Rahman ould al-Hajj Shaykh Tahir ould al-Hajj Sidi Muhammad Mahmoud ould al-Hajj
- Occupation: Islamic scholar

Religious life
- Religion: Islam
- Sect: Sunni
- Jurisprudence: Maliki
- Creed: Ashari

Muhammad Ould Fahfu al-Massumi (c. 1913 – July 17, 2018), Sidi Muhammad Bin Salik Ould Fahfu al-Amsami, better known as Murabit al-Hajj was a Mauritanian Islamic scholar who devoted his life to worship, learning and teaching Islamic sciences. Teachers and students from around the world would often travel to study under his guidance. Based in a remote village in Mauritania, he trained hundreds, if not thousands of scholars, including Hamza Yusuf.

== Hajj ==
In the 1940s, Sidi Muhammad Ould Fahfu travelled to Mecca on foot to perform the Hajj; when he returned, he was given the title, Murabit al-Hajj.

== Influence ==
In 2016, he was selected by The Royal Islamic Strategic Studies Centre amongst 'The 500 Most Influential Muslims'.

== Family ==
He was married to Maryam Bint Muhammad al-Amin Ould Muhammad Ahmad Bwayba Maryam Bint Bwayba, who memorized the entire Qur’an as well as the basic Maliki texts and Imam al-Nawawi's book of prayers and supplications (Kitab al-Adhkar).

== Gallery ==
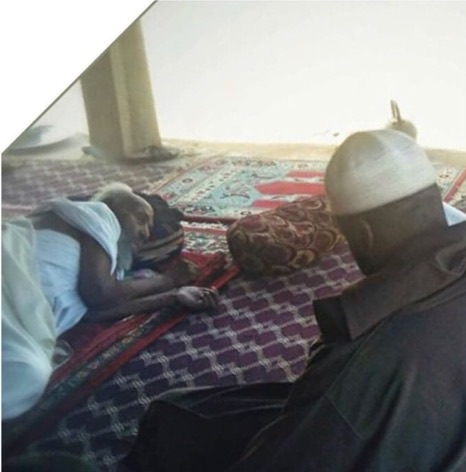
Murabit Al-Hajj With Ibrahim Osi-Efa

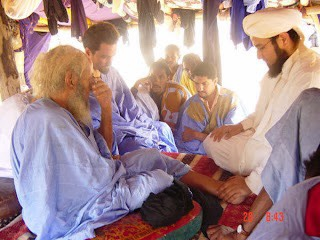
Murabit Al-Hajj with Hamza Yusuf and Ali al-Jifri.
