= The 500 Most Influential Muslims =

Annual publication of influential Muslims

- The cover of the 2009 edition
- Author: John L. Esposito (contributor of the 2009 edition only), İbrahim Kalın, Usra Ghazi, Prince Alwaleed Center for Muslim–Christian Understanding, S. Abdallah Schleifer
- Language: English
- Series: 1st Edition (2009); 2nd Edition (2010); 3rd Edition (2011); 4th Edition (2012); 5th Edition (2013/14); 6th Edition (2014/15); 7th Edition (2016); 8th Edition (2017); 9th Edition (2018); 10th Edition (2019); 11th Edition (2020); 12th Edition (2021); 13th Edition (2022); 14th Edition (2023)
- Subject: Biographical dictionary
- Genre: Non-fiction
- Publisher: Royal Islamic Strategic Studies Centre, Createspace
- Publication date: January 16, 2009
- Publication place: United Kingdom
- Media type: Online, print
- Pages: 206
- ISBN: 978-9957-428-37-2
- OCLC: 514462119
- Website: themuslim500.com

The 500 Most Influential Muslims (also known as The Muslim 500) is an annual publication first published in 2009, which ranks the most influential Muslims in the world.

The publication is compiled by the Royal Islamic Strategic Studies Centre in Amman, Jordan. The report is issued annually in cooperation with Prince Al-Waleed Bin Talal Center for Muslim-Christian Understanding at Georgetown University in the United States.

Qatar's emir Tamim bin Hamid Al-Thani took first place in the 2022 edition. He was followed by King Salman of Saudi Arabia, Iranian supreme leader Ali Khamenei and Turkey's president Recep Tayyip Erdoğan. King Abdullah II of Jordan, Pakistani Sunni Islamic scholar Taqi Usmani, King Mohammed VI of Morocco, President of the UAE Mohammed bin Zayed Al Nahyan, Iranian Shia Islamic scholar Ali al-Sistani and Pakistani Sunni Islamic scholar Aurangzeb Farooqi are also among the top 9 in the top 10 in the list.

Critics have noted that its top 50 list gives more weight to political leaders, who due to the nature of political systems in the Middle East enjoy considerable clout and influence in the regional politics. As such the influence of individuals listed in the top 50 owes much to the fact of their existence in the political spectrum.

== Overview ==
The publication highlights people who are influential as Muslims. That is people whose influence is derived from their practice of Islam or from the fact that they are Muslim. The influence can be of a religious scholar directly addressing Muslims and influencing their beliefs, ideas and behaviour, or it can be of a ruler shaping the socio-economic factors within which people live their lives, or of artists shaping popular culture. The first two examples also point to the fact that the lists, and especially the Top 50, are dominated by religious scholars and heads of state. Their dominant and lasting influence cannot be denied, especially the rulers, who in many cases also appoint religious scholars to their respective positions.

Nominations are evaluated on the basis of the influence that particular Muslims have had within the Muslim community and the manner in which their influence has benefited the Muslim community, both within the Islamic world and in terms of representing Islam to non-Muslims. "Influential" for the purposes of the book is defined as "any person who has the power (be it cultural, ideological, financial, political or otherwise) to make a change that will have a significant impact on the Muslim World".

The publication defines eligible entries with the following: "Traditional Islam (96% of the world's Muslims): Also known as Orthodox Islam, this ideology is not politicized and largely based on consensus of correct opinion—thus including the Sunni, Shi'a, and Ibadi branches of practice (and their subgroups) within the fold of Islam, and not groups such as the Druze or the Ahmadiyya, among others."

The book starts with an overall top 50, ranked the most influential Muslims in the world. The remaining 450 most prominent Muslims is broken down into 15 categories without ranking, of scholarly, political, administrative, lineage, preachers and spiritual guides, women, youth, philanthropy/charity, development, science and technology, arts and culture, Qu'ran reciters, media, radicals, international Islamic networks and issues of the day. Each year the biographies are updated.

The publication also gives an insight into the different ways that Muslims impact the world and also shows the diversity of how people are living as Muslims today. The book's appendices comprehensively list populations of Muslims in nations worldwide, and its introduction gives a snapshot view of different ideological movements within the Muslim world, breaking down clearly distinctions between traditional Islam and recent radical innovations.

== Publications ==
=== 2009 edition ===
In 2009, the book was edited by Professors John L. Esposito and Ibrahim Kalin at Georgetown University in Washington, DC.

The 500 most influential Muslims were chosen largely in terms of their overt influence. The top 50 is dominated by religious scholars and either heads of state, which automatically gives them an advantage when it comes to influence, or they have inherited their position. Lineage is a significant factor – it has its own category – and the predisposition to include children of important people reveals a mindset that indicates achievement is an optional extra. The top 50 fits into six broad categories as follows: 12 are political leaders (kings, generals, presidents), four are spiritual leaders (Sufi shaykhs), 14 are national or international religious authorities, three are "preachers", six are high-level scholars, 11 are leaders of movements or organizations.

The book has given the first place to King Abdullah bin Abdulaziz of Saudi Arabia. Second place went to Ayatollah Syed Ali Khamenei, the spiritual leader of Iran. King Mohammed VI of Morocco found third place and King Abdullah II Al-Hussain of Jordan occupied fourth place. Fifth place went to Turkey's Prime Minister Recep Tayyip Erdoğan.

The first solely religious leader is Iraq's Ayatollah Ali al-Sistani in seventh place. Fethullah Gülen came 13th. The heads of Hezbollah; Seyyed Hassan Nasrallah listed 17th and Hamas Khaled Mashal listed 34th.

The highest-ranking American (and highest-ranking convert) at 38th place was Sheikh Hamza Yusuf Hanson, founder of the Zaytuna Institute in Berkeley, California. Right after him comes the highest-ranking European, Sheikh Mustafa Cerić, grand mufti of Bosnia and Herzegovina.

In total 72 Americans are among the 500, a disproportionately strong showing. Timothy Winter (Abdal Hakim Murad) was the highest ranked British Muslim, in an unspecified position between 51st and 60th, considerably higher than the three other British people who made the list – the Conservative Party chairman Baroness Sayeeda Warsi; the UK's first Muslim life peer, Lord Nazir Ahmed; and Anas Al Shaikh Ali, director of the International Institute of Islamic Thought.

The women featured had a separate section from the men. There were only three women listed in the top 50. Sheikha Munira al-Qubaysi (number 21), an educator of girls and women; Queen Rania of Jordan (number 37), who promotes global education; and Sheikha Mozah bint Nasser Al Missned of Qatar (number 38), who is chairwoman of the Qatar Foundation for Education, Science and Community Development.

The listing also includes an extensive Arts and Culture Section. The general Arts and Culture Section included the names of singers Salif Keita, Youssou N'Dour, Raihan, Yusuf Islam and Sami Yusuf, Dawud Wharnsby; musician A. R. Rahman (India); film stars Salman Khan, Aamir Khan and Shahrukh Khan; comedian Azhar Usman and martial artist Ma Yue. All the Qāriʾs (Quran reciters) listed in the book are from Saudi Arabia.

Foreign Policy magazine's Marc Lynch stated, "Esposito and Kalin's methodology seems strange. Any list in which the Sultan of Oman (Qaboos bin Said al Said, who was sixth) outranks, say, Turkish preacher Fethullah Gülen (placed 13th) or the Aga Khan (Aga Khan IV, who was placed 20th) seems odd to this observer..."

=== 2011 edition ===
In 2011, achievements of a lifetime were given more weight than achievements within the current year. which meant that the lists of names were going to change gradually, rather than dramatically, year-on-year. The Arab Spring had no impact on Saudi King Abdullah of Saudi Arabia's influence, it had boosted King Mohammed VI of Morocco's influence, who moved up to second place, and it had no effect on Turkish Prime Minister Recep Tayyip Erdoğan who came in third place.

Erdoğan was expected by many to receive the top spot in light of the Arab Spring. Erdoğan was credited with Turkey's "Muslim democracy", and was seen as the leader of a country that, as the Brookings Institution said, "played the 'most constructive' role in the Arab events."

Emir of Qatar Sheikh Hamad bin Khalifa Al Thani influence rose during the Arab Spring, moving him to sixth place. He had driven much of the Arab Spring through the coverage given by Al Jazeera, given financial support to protesters and political support to Libya, making him arguably the biggest enabler of the Arab Spring.

=== 2012 edition ===
In 2012, the edition was published by S. Abdallah Schleifer, professor emeritus and Senior Fellow Kamal Adham Center for Television & Digital Journalism, the American University in Cairo.

There were more Muslims from America than any other country again with 41 spots on the 500 list. Countries with the next highest number of names were Egypt, Pakistan, Saudi Arabia, and the United Kingdom, with 25 Muslims each, followed by Indonesia, with 24. It lists the winners according to 13 categories, including spiritual guides, Quran reciters, scholars, politicians, celebrities, sports figures, radicals, and media leaders.

For the fourth year running, Saudi king Abdullah bin Abdulaziz topped the list. He was followed by Turkish prime minister Recep Tayyip Erdoğan at second place. Erdoğan's advance gave him advantage over Moroccan King Mohammed VI who took the third place. Fourth place went to Mohammed Badie, whose name appeared in the top 10 for the first time. He was followed by Qatari emir Sheikh Hamad bin Khalifa Al Thani who took the fifth place. Sheikh Al-Azhar Ahmad el-Tayeb and prominent Islamic scholar Yusuf al-Qaradawi who is President of Global Association of Muslim Scholars, also made it to the top 10 ranks.

=== 2013/2014 edition ===
In 2013, the list was edited once again by professor emeritus S. Abdallah Schleifer of the American University in Cairo.

The top of the list went to Sheikh Ahmed el-Tayeb, the grand sheikh of the Al Azhar University for the prominent role played by him in Egypt's troubled democratic transition. His astute decision making over the past couple of years has preserved the traditional approach of Al-Azhar which faced threats from Islamists and Salafis in the years that have followed Mubarak's fall. His public support of General Abdel Fattah el-Sisi's coup also gave it a strong religious grounding that was necessary for it to achieve the legitimacy needed to prevent a civil war, effectively making him a "king-maker" and cementing his place at the top of the list. He was followed on the listing by Saudi King Abdullah bin Abdul-Aziz Al-Saud and Iranian Grand Leader Ayatollah Sayyid Ali Khamenei.

Reflective of the wider trajectory of the Arab Spring, this year's list showed a decline in influence from Muslim Brotherhood associated figures Mohammed Badie, Sheikh Yusuf al Qaradawi and ousted Egyptian president Mohamed Morsi. Coup kingpin General Abdel Fattah el-Sisi who was previously unlisted now ranks at 29.

The US dominates the list again with 41 inclusions including Muhammad Ali, Dr Mehmet Oz, Rep. Keith Ellison, Yasiin Bey (Mos Def), and Fareed Zakaria. Representing the UK are Mo Farah, Yusuf Islam, Riz Khan, Baroness Sayeeda Warsi, Cambridge's Timothy Winter and 18 others.

=== 2014/2015 edition ===
In 2014, the chief editor of the list was again Professor S Abdallah Schleifer. The top spot went back to Saudi King Abdullah bin Abdul Aziz al-Saud, due to his being the "absolute monarch of the most powerful Arab nation." The list accords him the place in light of Saudi Arabia being home to Islam's two holy cities of Makkah and Madinah, which millions of Muslims visit throughout the year, as well as the kingdom's oil exports. Rounding out the top three were Dr Muhammad Ahmed al-Tayeb, grand sheikh of Al-Azhar University and grand imam of Al-Azhar mosque, and Iran's Supreme Leader Ali Khamenei. The top nine were all political leaders and royals, including Morocco's King Mohammed VI and Turkish President Recep Tayyip Erdogan.

The top 50 fit into six broad categories: 12 were political leaders (kings, generals, presidents), four are spiritual leaders (Sufi shaykhs), 14 are national or international religious authorities, three are "preachers", six are high-level scholars, 11 are leaders of movements or organizations. In total 72 Americans are among the 500 most influential Muslims, a disproportionately strong showing, but only one among the top 50, Sheikh Hamza Yusuf Hanson of Zaytuna Institute listed at number 38.

=== 2016 edition ===
In 2015, the top 50 was again dominated by religious scholars and heads of state. The top five were: King Abdullah of Jordan; Ahmed el-Tayeb, the grand sheikh of Egypt's Al-Azhar University; King Salman of Saudi Arabia; Iran's supreme leader Ayatollah Ali Khamenei; and King Mohammed VI of Morocco. Turkish president Recep Tayyip Erdogan came in at number eight, but surprisingly Syrian President Bashar al-Assad did not make the Top 50 this year or last, though he was still listed in the 500. The prime minister of Iraq did not make the list, but Iraq's Grand Ayatollah Sayyid Ali Hussein Sistani did, coming in at number nine.

There were 32 newcomers to the 2016 list. 22 Indians featured on the list. As in past years, there continued to be more Muslims from the United States than any other country. Since at least 2012, the U.S. has outpaced nations with a far larger Muslim population, with at least 40 notable people of influence, with Pakistan (33), Saudi Arabia (32), Egypt (27) and the UK (27).

=== 2017 edition ===
In 2017, the top five were Sheikh Ahmad al-Tayyeb of Egypt; King Abdullah II of Jordan of Jordan; King Salman of Saudi Arabia; Ayatollah Ali Khamenei of Iran; King Mohammed VI of Morocco.

=== 2018 edition ===
In 2018, the top five were Sheikh Ahmad Muhammad Al-Tayeeb of Egypt; King Salman bin Abdul-Aziz Al-Saud of Saudi Arabia; King Abdullah II Ibn Al-Hussein of Jordan; Ayatollah Hajj Sayyid Ali Khamenei of Iran; President Recep Tayyip Erdoğan of Turkey.

=== 2019 edition ===
In 2019, the top five were President Recep Tayyip Erdoğan of Turkey; King Salman bin Abdul-Aziz Al-Saud of Saudi Arabia; King Abdullah II Ibn Al-Hussein of Jordan; Ayatollah Hajj Sayyid Ali Khamenei of Iran; King Mohammad VI of Morocco.

=== 2020 edition ===
In 2020, the top five were Sheikh Mufti Taqi Usmani of Pakistan, President Recep Tayyip Erdoğan of Turkey; King Salman bin Abdulaziz Al Saud of Saudi Arabia; Ayatollah Hajj Sayyid Ali Khamenei of Iran; King Abdullah II Ibn Al-Hussein of Jordan.

The Woman of the Year was Rashida Tlaib of the United States and the Man of the Year was Imran Khan of Pakistan.

=== 2021 edition ===
In 2021, the top five were President Recep Tayyip Erdoğan president of Turkey; King Salman bin Abdulaziz Al Saud of Saudi Arabia; Ayatollah Hajj Sayyid Ali Khamenei of Iran, and King Abdullah II Ibn Al-Hussein of Jordan.

The Woman of the Year was Bilkis Bano of India and the Man of the Year was Ilham Tohti of China.

=== 2022 edition ===
In 2022, the top five were Sheikh Tamim bin Hamad Al-Thani of Qatar; King Salman bin Abdulaziz Al Saud of Saudi Arabia; Ayatollah Hajj Sayyid Ali Khamenei of Iran; President Recep Tayyib Erdoğan of Turkey, and King Abdullah II of Jordan.

The Woman of the Year was President Samia Suluhu Hassan of Tanzania and the Man of the Year was Uğur Şahin of Germany.

=== 2023 edition ===
In 2023, the top five were Salman bin Saudi Arabia king Custodian of the Two Holy Mosques, Sayyid Ali Khamenei Supreme Leader of Iran, Sheikh Tamim bin Hamid Al-Thani Emir of Qatar, President Recep Tayyib Erdoğan of Turkey, and King Abdullah II of Jordan.

The Woman of the Year was Aisha Abdurrahman Bewley and the Man of the Year was Mahmood Madani President of Jamiat Ulama-i-Hind from India.

=== 2024 edition ===
In 2024, the top five were Habib Umar bin Hafiz, founder and dean of Dar al-Mustafa Islamic seminary, King Salman bin Abdulaziz Al Saud of Saudi Arabia, Sayyid Ali Khamenei Supreme Leader of Iran, Sheikh Tamim bin Hamid Al Thani, Emir of Qatar, and King Abdullah II of Jordan.

The Woman of the Year was Edna Adan Ismail and the Man of the Year was Syed Muhammad Naquib al-Attas.

== Current top nine ==
Rank	Change	Name	Citizenship	Age	Image	Occupation	Source of Influence	Influence	School of Thought	Previous rankings:
1	▲10	Umar bin Hafiz	Yemen	27 May 1963 (age 63)		Founder and Dean of Dar al-Mustafa Islamic seminary	Scholarly, Lineage	Preacher, Spiritual Guide	Traditional Sunni	33 (2009); 37 (2010) ▼4; 37 (2011); 36 (2012) ▲1; 28 (2013/14) ▲8; 28 (2014/15); 28 (2016); 25 (2017) ▲3; 10 (2018) ▲15; 8 (2019) ▲2; 9 (2020) ▼1; 9 (2021); 11 (2022) ▼2; 11 (2023)
2	▼1	King Salman bin Abdul-Aziz Al-Saud	Saudi Arabia	December 31, 1935 (age 90)		King of Saudi Arabia and Custodian of the Two Holy Mosques	Political & Administrative	King with authority over 38.5 million residents of Saudi Arabia and approximately 14 million pilgrims annually.	Hanbali Sunni-Salafi	3 (2016) ▲3 (2017); 2 (2018) ▲1; 2 (2019); 4 (2020) ▼2; 2 (2021) ▲2; 2 (2022); 1 (2023) ▲1
3	▼1	Grand Ayatollah Ali Khamenei	Iran	19 April 1939 (age 86) (Killed 28 February 2026)		Supreme Leader of the Republic of Iran	Political, Administrative	Supreme Leader of 82.5 million Iranians. Ayatollah of Twelver Shias worldwide.	Traditional Twelver Shi‘a, Revolutionary Shi'ism, Usuli	2 (2009); 3 (2010) ▲1; 5 (2011) ▼2; 6 (2012) ▼1; 3 (2013/14) ▲3; 3 (2014/15); 4 (2016) ▼4 (2017); 4 (2018); 4 (2019); 2 (2020) ▲2; 3 (2021) ▼1; 3 (2022); 2 (2023) ▲1
4	▼1	Tamim bin Hamad Al Thani	Qatar	3 June 1980 (age 46)		Emir of Qatar	Political	Ruler of Qatar.	Traditional Sunni	19 (2019); 12 (2020) ▲7; 11 (2021) ▲1; 1 (2022) ▲5+ 3 (2023) ▼2
5	Steady	King Abdullah II of Jordan	Jordan	January 30, 1962 (age 64)		King of the Hashemite Kingdom of Jordan	Political, Lineage	King with authority over approximately 7 million Jordanians and outreach to traditional Islam. Custodian of the Holy Sites in Jerusalem.	Traditional Sunni	4 (2009); 4 (2010); 4 (2011); 7 (2012) ▼3; 4 (2013/14) ▲3; 4 (2014/15); 1 (2016) ▲3; 2 (2017) ▼1; 3 (2018) ▼1; 3 (2019); 5 (2020) ▼3; 4 (2021) ▲1; 5 (2022) ▼1; 5 (2023)
6	▲2	Sheikh Mohammed bin Zayed Al Nahyan	(United Arab Emirates); UAE	March 11, 1961 (age 65)		Ruler of Abu Dhabi and President of the UAE	Administration of Religious Affairs, Philanthropy, Charity and Development, Political	Military and political leadership.	Traditional Sunni	22 (2009); 22 (2010); 18 (2011) ▲4; 15 (2012) ▲3; 10 (2013/14) ▲5; 9 (2014/15) ▲1; 7 (2016) ▼2; 12 (2017) ▼5; 15 (2018) ▼3; 15 (2019); 3 (2020) ▲12; 7 (2021) ▼4; 8 (2022) ▼1; 8 (2023)
7	▼3	Recep Tayyip Erdoğan	Turkey	February 26, 1954 (age 72)		President of Turkey	Political	President of over 85 million Turkish citizens	Traditional Sunni, Hanafi	5 (2009); 2 (2010) ▲3; 3 (2011) ▼1; 2 (2012) ▲1; 6 (2013/14) ▼4; 6 (2014/15); 8 (2016) ▼2; 8 (2017); 5 (2018) ▲3; 1 (2019) ▲4; 6 (2020) ▼5; 1 (2021) ▲5; 4 (2022) ▼3; 4 (2023)
8	▼2	Mufti Taqi Usmani	Pakistan	October 5, 1943 (age 83)		Deobandi leader	Scholar	Leading scholar of Islamic jurisprudence who is considered to be the intellectual leader of the Deobandi movement. Veteran figure of Islamic banking and finance.	Deobandi Movement	27 (2009); 31 (2010) ▼4; 32 (2011) ▼1; 32 (2012); 25 (2013/14) ▲7; 19 (2014/15) ▲6; 22 (2016) ▼3; 6 (2017) ▲16; 7 (2018) ▼1; 6 (2019) ▲1; 1 (2020) ▲5; 5 (2021) ▼4; 6 (2022) ▼3; 6 2023
9	Steady	Ali al-Husayni al-Sistani	Iraq	August 4, 1930 (age 96)		Marja' of the Hawza, Najaf, Iraq	Scholarly, Lineage	Highest authority for 21 million Iraqi Shi‘a, and also internationally as religious authority to Usuli Twelver Shi‘a.	Traditional Twelver Shi‘a, Usuli	7 (2009); 8 (2010) ▼1; 10 (2011) ▼2; 13 (2012) ▼3; 8 (2013/14) ▲5; 7 (2014/15) ▲1; 9 (2016) ▼2; 7 (2017) ▲2; 8 (2018) ▼1; 7 (2019) ▲1; 8 (2020) ▼1; 8 (2021); 9 (2022) ▼1; 9 (2023)

== See also ==
- The Muslim 100
- The 100: A Ranking of the Most Influential Persons in History
- Forbes list of The World's Most Powerful People
- Who's Who
