= Murad Wilfried Hofmann =

German diplomat and author (1931–2020)

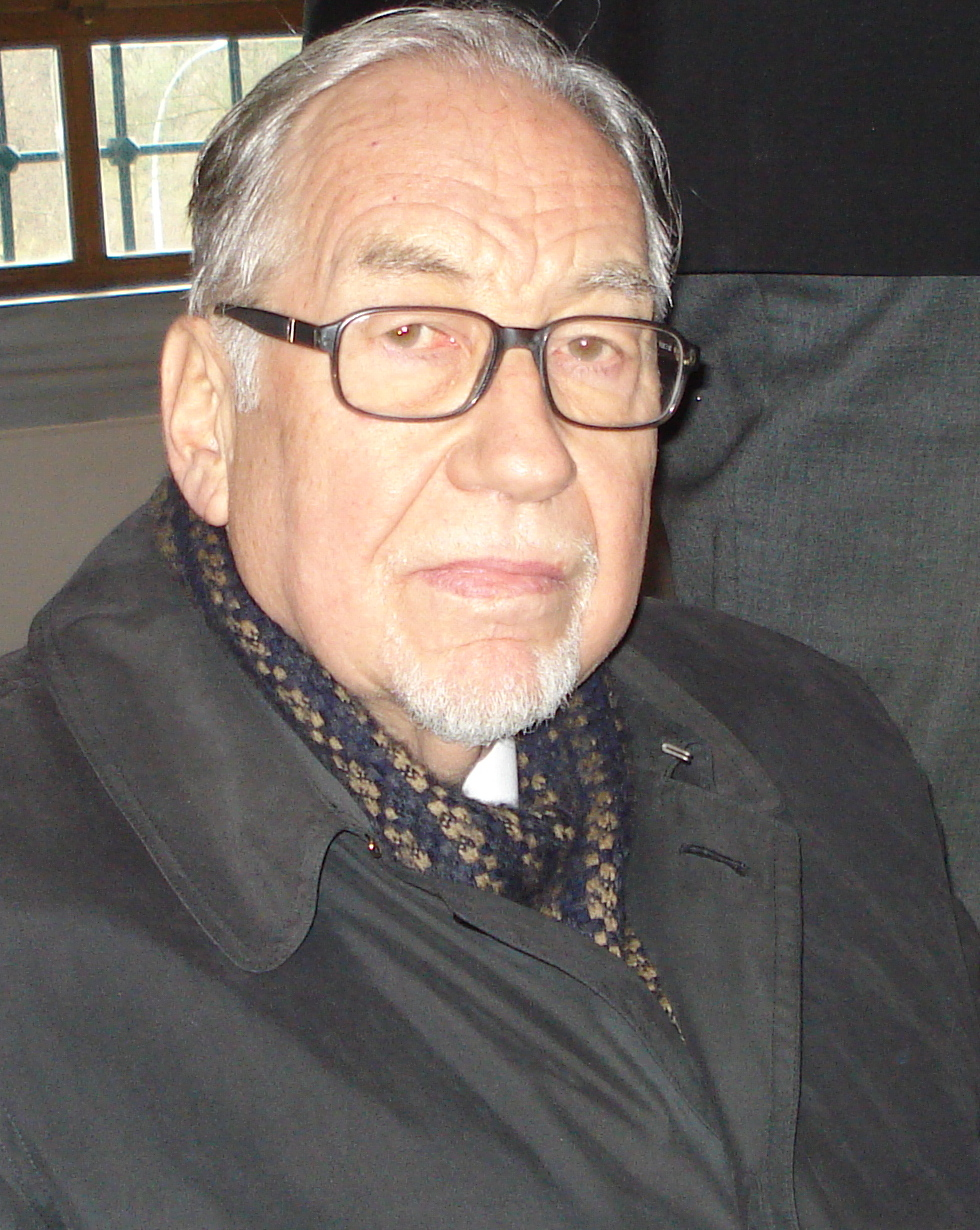
- Hofmann in Berlin

German Ambassador to Algeria
- In office 1987–1990

German Ambassador to Morocco
- In office 1990–1994

Director for Information at NATO
- In office 1983–1987

Personal details
- Born: 6 July 1931 Aschaffenburg, Bavaria, Germany
- Died: 12 January 2020 (aged 88) Bonn, North Rhine-Westphalia, Germany

Murad Wilfried Hofmann (6 July 1931 – 12 January 2020) was a German diplomat and author. He wrote several books on Islam, including Journey to Makkah and Islam: The Alternative. Many of his books and essays focused on Islam's place in the West and, after 11 September, in particular, in the United States. He was one of the signatories of A Common Word Between Us and You, an open letter by Islamic scholars to Christian leaders, calling for peace and understanding.

== Biography ==
Hofmann was born in Aschaffenburg to an intellectual family related to Hugo Ball, a co-founder of Dadaism. Although raised a Catholic, he converted to Islam in 1980. He studied at Harvard University. His conversion was met with some controversy due to his high profile in the German government. He converted to Islam as a result of what he witnessed in the Algerian War of Independence, his fondness for Islamic art, and what he saw as contradictions in Paulist Christian doctrine.

Hofmann served in the German Foreign Service from 1961 to 1994. He first served in Algeria as a specialist on issues concerning nuclear defence. He went on to serve as Director of Information for NATO at Brussels from 1983 to 1987, Ambassador to Algeria from 1987 to 1990, and Ambassador to Morocco from 1990 to 1994.

Hofmann was an honorary member and advisor to the Central Council of Muslims in Germany.

== Commendations ==
- Federal Cross of Merit, Germany.
- Commander of the Order of Merit, Italy.
- Order of Merit in the Arts and Sciences, 1st Class, Egypt.
- Grand Cordon

== Publications ==
- 1973 Of Beauty and the Dance: Towards an Aesthetics of Ballet, in: Three Essays in Dance Aesthetic, Dance Perspectives No. 55, New York
- 1981 Wie MBFR begann, in: Im Dienste Deutschland und des Rechtes, Festschrift für Wilhelm G. Grewe, Nomos, Baden-Baden
- 1984 Is NATO's Defence Policy facing a Crisis?, in: Non-Nuclear War in Europe, Groningen University Press, Groningen
- 1981 Ein philosophischer Weg zum Islam
- 1984 Zur Rolle der islamischen Philosophie
- 1985 Tagebuch eines deutschen Muslims
- 1992 Der Islam als Alternative, Diederichs, ISBN 3-424-01114-2 (English title: Islam: The Alternative (ISBN 0-915957-71-X))
- 1996 Reise nach Mekka, Diederichs, ISBN 3-424-01308-0 (English title: Journey to Makkah (ISBN 0-915957-85-X))
- 1998 Überarbeitung der Koranübersetzung von Max Henning, Istanbul und München
- 2000 Der Islam im 3. Jahrtausend, Diederichs-Hugendubel, ISBN 3-7205-2124-9
- 2008 – 'Mustaqbal al-Islam fī al-Gharb wa-al-Sharq' [The Future of Islam in the West and the East], co-authored with ^{c}Abd al-Majid al-Sharafī, published by Dar al-Fikr in Damascus, 2008

== See also ==
- List of converts to Islam
- Islam in Europe
- Muhammad Asad
