= Abbas Jirari =

Moroccan writer (1937–2024)

- عباس الجراري
- Born: 15 February 1937; Rabat, French Morocco
- Died: 20 January 2024 (aged 86)
- Occupations: Intellectual, civil servant
- Employer: Mohammed VI of Morocco
- Known for: Adviser of Mohammed VI of Morocco

Abbas Jirari (Arabic: عباس الجراري; 15 February 1937 – 20 January 2024), also spelled as Abbas al-Jarari, Abbas al-Jirari or Abbès Jirari, was a Moroccan intellectual and advisor to King Mohammed VI of Morocco.

== Biography ==
Abbas Jirari was born on 15 February 1937. He studied Arabic language and literature at the University of Cairo in Egypt and worked in the Moroccan ministry of foreign affairs in the 1960s. He was a professor at the Faculty of Arts and Humanities in Rabat.

Jirari was one of the 138 signatories of the open letter for Christian-Muslim dialogue A Common Word Between Us and You.

Jirari was married and had three children. He died on 20 January 2024, at the age of 86.
