= Abdallah Schleifer =

American academician (1935–2025)

Sulayman Abdallah Sharif Schleifer
- Born: Schleifer, Marc; 1935; New York City, U.S.
- Died: 27 March 2025 (aged 89–90); Cairo, Egypt
- Education: B.A., University of Pennsylvania, political science, 1956; M.A., American University of Beirut, political studies, 1980
- Occupations: Journalist, commentator
- Years active: 1970–2025
- Employer: American University in Cairo
- Organization(s): Global Experts; Foreign Policy Research Institute, Royal Aal al-Bayt Institute for Islamic Thought, Al Arabiya

S. Abdallah S. Schleifer (born Marc Schleifer; 1935 – 27 March 2025) was an American Middle East scholar who served as a senior fellow at the Foreign Policy Research Institute (United States) and the Royal Aal al-Bayt Institute for Islamic Thought (Jordan).

== Life and career ==
Schleifer was born in 1935. A one-time NBC Cairo Bureau chief (1974–1983), Schleifer also served as the Al Arabiya News bureau chief in Washington D.C. (2006–2007) and wrote periodic columns for their website. He was the chief editor of the annual publication The 500 Most Influential Muslims.

His career in journalism in the Middle East began in 1965, when he served as the first managing editor of The Jerusalem Star, an English-language Jordanian newspaper that has since changed its name to The Palestine News. In 1967, Schleifer became an editorial assistant and then a special correspondent for The New York Times in Jerusalem and then in Amman, and, from 1968-1972, the Middle East correspondent of Jeune Afrique.

He was professor emeritus and senior fellow at the Kamal Adham Center for Journalism Training and Research, at the American University in Cairo - which he founded, and for which he served as its first director (1985–2005).

Schleifer was executive producer of Control Room (2004), a documentary film about Al Jazeera and its relations with the US Central Command.

During his career, he interviewed many Middle Eastern leaders—heads of state as well as Ayman al-Zawahiri the leader of Al-Qaeda since 2011.

Born Mark Schleifer to a secular Jewish family on Long Island, he received his BA in political science from the University of Pennsylvania in 1956 where he was involved in Marxist movements. He was a convert to Islam with Sufi-orientation.

Schleifer died on 27 March 2025.
