= Prince Alwaleed Bin Talal Center for Muslim-Christian Understanding =

Academic institute at Georgetown University

- Named after: Al-Waleed bin Talal
- Formation: 1993
- Type: Non-profit
- Purpose: Interfaith relations
- Headquarters: Washington, D.C., U.S.
- Location: Georgetown University
- Region served: United States
- Board of directors: Nader Hashemi
- Website: cmcu.georgetown.edu

The Prince Alwaleed Bin Talal Center for Muslim-Christian Understanding (ACMCU) is an interfaith institution based at the Georgetown University School of Foreign Service in Washington, D.C.

== Overview ==
The institution was founded at Georgetown University in Washington, D.C., 1993 as the Center for Muslim-Christian Understanding. It is housed within the Georgetown University School of Foreign Service.

In 2005, a wealthy Saudi prince and businessman, Al-Waleed bin Talal, gave $20 million to the Center to promote interfaith understanding and the study of Islam and the Muslim world. The center was renamed in his honor. The $20 million gift was the second-largest ever given to the Georgetown at that point. Bin Talal simultaneously gave $20 million to Harvard University's interdisciplinary Islamic studies program and $15 million to establish American studies programs at the American University in Beirut and American University in Cairo.

The founding director of the center was John Esposito. Esposito was succeeded by John O. Voll.

The Center was co-publisher (with the UK's Birmingham University Centre for the Study of Islam and Christian-Muslim Relations) of the journal Islam and Christian-Muslim Relations. The Center hosts the Bridge Initiative, which is a multi-year research project on Islamophobia focusing on analysis, educational resources, commentary and public-facing research.

In 2008, Republican U.S. Representative Frank Wolf questioned the prince's gift, and whether the center had ever been critical of the Saudi government.

The ACMCU was part of the collaboration with the Royal Islamic Strategic Studies Center in 2009 for the publication of the first edition of The 500 Most Influential Muslims in the World.

The current director is Nader Hashemi.
