= Dar al-Mustafa =

Yemeni Islamic university based in Tarim, Hadhramaut

Coordinates: 16.0504°N 48.9754°E

- دار المصطفى للدراسات الإسلامية
- Type: Madrasa
- Established: 1997
- Founder: Habib Umar bin Hafiz
- Religious affiliation: Sunni Shafi'ism; Ash'arism
- Chancellor: Habib Umar bin Hafiz
- Location: Tarim, Hadhramaut, Yemen
- Website: Dar al-Mustafa

Dar al-Mustafa is a Yemeni Islamic university based in Tarim, Hadhramaut.

== History ==
In 1993, the Islamic seminary was founded by Habib Umar bin Hafiz. The Dar al-Mustafa campus was officially opened in May 1997 and incorporated as a center for traditional Islamic scholarship.

In 2007, there were 250 students from various countries studying at the school. In 2009, the school had approximately 700 students, most of whom were aged between 18 and 25.

As a result of the school's popularity, East Tarim has continued to grow as there has been an influx of students and spiritual leaders relocating to the region with their families.

== About ==
The education at Dar al-Mustafa follows the methodology of traditional Islamic studies teaching in Arabic. Studies are focused on Islamic jurisprudence, Arabic grammar, Islamic theology, Qur'anic memorization, Qur'anic exegesis, prophetic traditions and sciences of the heart. The curriculum is designed so that an average student can complete all of the core classes in a period of four years.

Based in the town of Tarim, many of the scholars are from amongst the Ba 'Alawiyyin Sayyids, hence, propagating the Ba 'Alawiyya Tariqa.

Every year, the school organises summer courses for 40 days between July and August, known as "The Dowra".

== See also ==
- List of Islamic educational institutions
- Al-Azhar University
- University of al-Qarawiyyin
