= Faraz Rabbani =

Pakistani-Canadian Islamic scholar

Shaykh Faraz Rabbani

Personal life
- Known for: Founding SeekersGuidance Academy

Religious life
- Religion: Islam
- Denomination: Sunni
- Jurisprudence: Hanafi
- Creed: Maturidi

Faraz Rabbani is a Pakistani-Canadian Islamic scholar, instructor in online Islamic institutes, of which he has been a developer, and the translator of books on Islamic teachings.

== Life and education ==
Faraz Rabbani was born to Pakistani parents but spent his childhood living in Egypt, Spain and Canada.

Rabbani received a Bachelors degree in Economics and Commerce from the University of Toronto. After receiving his degree, he traveled to Syria and Jordan, studying under scholars such as Shaykh Hassan al-Hindi and Shaykh Adib Kallas.

== Career ==
Faraz Rabbani is the founder, education director, and instructor at SeekersGuidance (formerly SeekersHub Global), an online educational institute which has a Q&A service, online courses, and occasional retreats. He carries the title of sheikh. From 2011 to 2018 he served as executive director of SeekersHub Toronto in Mississauga, Ontario, Canada, which was reestablished as SeekersGuidance Canada in 2019. Before that he was a central figure with SunniPath, an online Islamic institute, and has, according to one publication "continuously been at the vanguard of effectively utilizing the latest web technologies and services to teach Islam in the West for over a decade." He has issued a fatwa against all forms of domestic violence including physical, emotional, and spoken forms.

He has been listed in The Muslim 500 as one of the world's 500 most influential Muslims.

== Publications ==
- Absolute Essentials of Islam: Faith, Prayer, and the Path of Salvation According to the Hanafi School (Santa Barbara: White Thread Press, 2004)
