= Timothy Winter =

English Islamic scholar (born 1960)

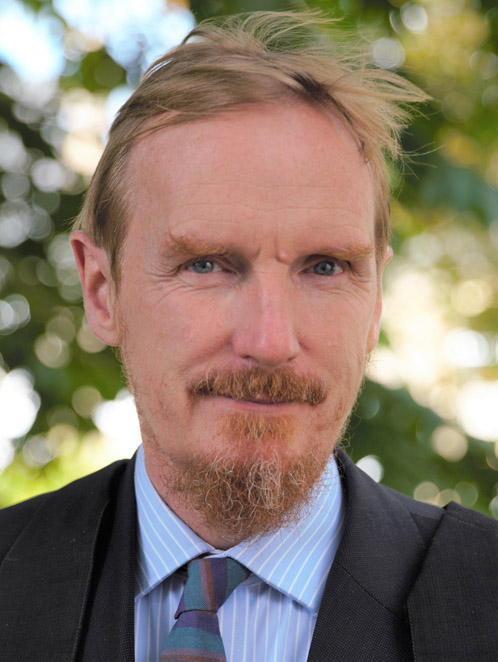
- Winter in August 2017
- Title: Shaykh
- Official name: Abdal Hakim Murad

Personal life
- Born: Timothy John Winter; 15 May 1960 (age 66) London, United Kingdom
- Main interest(s): Islam, Neo-traditionalism, theology, Islamic Jurisprudence, Sufism
- Education: University of Cambridge; University of al-Azhar; University of London; University of Oxford; Vrije Universiteit Amsterdam
- Occupation: Scholar; professor

Religious life
- Religion: Islam
- Denomination: Sunni
- Creed: Ash'ari
- Movement: Neo-Traditionalism

Timothy John Winter (born 15 May 1960), also known as Abdal Hakim Murad (Arabic: عبد الحكيم مراد), is an English Islamic scholar and theologian who is a proponent of Islamic neo-traditionalism. His work includes publications on Islamic theology, modernity, and Anglo-Muslim relations, and he has translated several Islamic texts.

He is the Founder and Dean of the Cambridge Muslim College, Aziz Foundation Professor of Islamic studies at both Cambridge Muslim College and Ebrahim College, Director of Studies (Theology and Religious Studies) at Wolfson College and the Shaykh Zayed Lecturer of Islamic Studies in the Faculty of Divinity at University of Cambridge.

In 2008 he started the Cambridge Mosque Project which raised money for the construction of a purpose-built mosque. The Cambridge Central Mosque opened on 24 April 2019 as the first purpose-built Mosque in Cambridge, and the first eco-mosque in Europe.

== Background and education ==
Shaykh Abdal Hakim Murad, born Timothy Winter, grew up in Highgate. His father was the famous architect John Winter and his mother was a painter. He was educated at Westminster School and graduated with a double-first in Arabic from Pembroke College, Cambridge, in 1983. He then went on to study at Al Azhar University in Cairo He has also engaged in private study with individual scholars in Saudi Arabia and Yemen. After returning to England, he studied Turkish and Persian at the University of London. In 2015, he received a PhD at Vrije Universiteit Amsterdam, with his dissertation entitled "An assessment of Islamic-Christian dichotomies in the light of Scriptural Reasoning"; it is embargoed until 2050.

=== Conversion to Islam ===
Murad converted to Islam in 1979. Reflecting on his early religious thinking, Murad has said that as a teenager he began questioning materialist explanations of beauty, concluding that it was “not something that can be explained away just as an aspect of brain function”. In the same context, he contrasted Christian and Islamic views of sexuality, stating that while in Christianity it is often understood as a consequence of the Fall, in Islam it is seen as “an anticipation of paradise”.

== Major work and projects ==
In 2009 Murad helped to open the Cambridge Muslim College, an institute designed to train British imams. Murad also directs the Anglo-Muslim Fellowship for Eastern Europe, and the Sunna Project which has published the foremost scholarly Arabic editions of the major Sunni Hadith collections. He serves as the secretary of the Muslim Academic Trust. Murad is active in translating key Islamic texts into English including a translation of two volumes of the Islamic scholar al-Ghazali's Ihya Ulum al-Din. His academic publications include many articles on Islamic theology and Muslim-Christian relations as well as two books in Turkish on political theology. His book reviews sometimes appear in the Times Literary Supplement. He is also the editor of the Cambridge Companion to Classical Islamic Theology (2008) and author of Bombing without Moonlight, which in 2007 was awarded the King Abdullah I Prize for Islamic Thought. Murad is also a contributor to BBC Radio 4's Thought for the Day. Additionally, Murad is one of the signatories of A Common Word Between Us and You, an open letter by Islamic scholars to Christian leaders, calling for peace and understanding.

=== Cambridge Mosque Project ===
Murad is the founder and leader of the Cambridge Central Mosque project which has developed a new purpose built mosque in Cambridge to cater for up to 1,000 worshipers. The mosque is an "eco-mosque" with substantial reliance on green energy and an almost-zero carbon footprint. Regarding the project, Murad stated, "This will be a very substantial world class landmark building in what is considered by some to be a down-at-heel part of Cambridge."

== Views ==
=== Views on Islamophobia ===
Murad has criticised the term "Islamophobia" for its implication that hostility to Islam and Muslims is based on race or tribalistic fear rather than enmity against their religion itself. Nonetheless, he has decried the rising hostility to Islam in Europe, and suggested that it is fuelled by the loss of faith and tradition within Europe itself, which he says results in Europeans formulating their identity by contrasting themselves with a Muslim Other.

=== Views on extremism ===
Murad is a traditionalist and considers the views of extremists like al-Qaeda as religiously illegitimate and inauthentic. He decries the failure of extremists to adhere to the classical canons of Islamic law and theology and denounces their fatwas. He unequivocally rejects suicide bombing and considers the killing of noncombatants as always forbidden, noting that some sources consider it worse than murder. According to Murad, Osama bin Laden and his right-hand man Ayman al-Zawahiri were entirely un-Islamic, unqualified vigilantes who violate basic Islamic teachings.

Murad is critical of Western foreign policy for fuelling anger and resentment in the Muslim world. He is also equally critical of Saudi Arabia's Wahhabi ideology, which he believes gives extremists a theological pretext for their extremism and violence.

=== Traditionalism ===
Murad has expressed agreement with Julius Evola's views on modernity, although he disagrees with his racist views.

== Personal life ==
Murad's younger brother is football writer Henry Winter.

== Awards and nominations ==
In 2003, he was awarded the Pilkington Teaching Prize by Cambridge University and in 2007 he was awarded the King Abdullah I Prize for Islamic Thought for his short booklet Bombing Without Moonlight. He has consistently been included in The 500 Most Influential Muslims list published annually by the Royal Aal al-Bayt Institute for Islamic Thought and was ranked in 2012 as the 50th most influential. In January 2015, Murad was nominated for the Services to Education award at the British Muslim Awards. Most recently in the 2022 Edition of The 500 Most Influential Muslims, Murad was ranked the 45th most influential Muslim in the world.

== Publications ==
=== Books written ===
- Piper at the Gates: A Theology of the Embodied Muslim Subject (Cambridge: CMC Press, 2026)
- Travelling Home: Essays on Islam in Europe (Cambridge: The Quilliam Press, 2020)
- Gleams from the Rawdat al-Shuhada: (Garden of the Martyrs) of Husayn Vaiz Kashifi (Cambridge: Muslim Academic Trust, 2015)
- Montmorency's Book of Rhymes Illustrated by Anne Yvonne Gilbert (California: Kinza Press, 2013)
- Commentary on the Eleventh Contentions (Cambridge: Quilliam Press Ltd, 2012)
- XXI Asrda Islom: Postmodern Dunyoda qiblani topish (Tashkent: Sharq nashriyoti, 2005)
- Muslim Songs of the British Isles: Arranged for Schools (London: Quilliam Press Ltd, 2005)
- Postmodern Dünya’da kibleyi bulmak (Istanbul: Gelenek, 2003)
- Co-authored with John A. Williams, Understanding Islam and the Muslims (Louisville: Fons Vitae, 2002)
- Understanding the Four Madhhabs: Facts About Ijtihad and Taqlid (Cambridge: Muslim Academic Trust, 1999)

=== Books edited ===
- The Cambridge Companion to Classical Islamic Theology (Cambridge: Cambridge University Press, 2008) ISBN 978-0-521-78058-2
- Islam, Religion of Life by Abdul Wadod Shalabi (USA: Starlatch Press, 2006) ISBN 1-929694-08-3
- Co-edited with Richard Harries and Norman Solomon, Abraham’s Children: Jews, Christians and Muslims in Conversation (Edinburgh: T&T Clark/Continuum, 2006)

=== Translations ===
- Imam al-Busiri, The Mantle Adorned (London: Quilliam Press, 2009)
- Al-Asqalani Ibn Hajar, Selections from Fath Al-Bari (Cambridge: Muslim Academic Trust, 2000)
- Abu Hamid al-Ghazali, Disciplining the Soul and Breaking the Two Desires (Cambridge: Islamic Texts Society, 1995)
- Roger Du Pasquier, Unveiling Islam (Cambridge: Islamic Texts Society, 1992)
- Imam al-Bayhaqi, Seventy-Seven Branches of Faith (London: Quilliam Press, 1990)
- Abu Hamid al-Ghazali, The Remembrance of Death and the Afterlife (Cambridge: Islamic Texts Society, 1989)

=== Articles ===
- “The Last Trump Card: Islam and the Supersession of Other Faiths.” Studies in Interreligious Dialogue 9/2 (1999): 133–155.
- “Pulchra ut luna: some Reflections on the Marian Theme in Muslim-Catholic Dialogue.” Journal of Ecumenical Studies 36/3 (1999): 439–469.
- "Muslim Loyalty and Belonging: Some Reflections on the Psychosocial Background." In British Muslims: Loyalty and Belonging, edited by Mohammad Siddique Seddon, Dilwar Hussain, and Nadeem Malik (Leicester: Islamic Foundation; London: Citizens Organising Foundation, 2003).
- “Tradition or Extradition? The threat to Muslim-Americans.” In The Empire and the Crescent: Global Implications for a New American Century, edited by Aftab Ahmad Malik (Bristol: Amal Press, 2003).
- “Readings of the ‘Reading’.” In Scriptures in Dialogue: Christians and Muslims Studying the Bible and the Qur'an Together, edited by Michael Ipgrace (London: Church House Publishing, 2004), 50–55.
- "The Poverty of Fanaticism." In Fundamentalism, and the Betrayal of Tradition, edited by Joseph Lumbard (Bloomington: World Wisdom, 2004).
- “Bombing Without Moonlight: the Origins of Suicidal Terrorism.” Encounters 10:1–2 (2004): 93–126.
- “The Chador of God on Earth: the Metaphysics of the Muslim Veil.” New Blackfriars 85 (2004): 144–157.
- "Qur'anic Reasoning as an Academic Practice." Modern Theology 22/3 (2006): 449–463; reprinted in The Promise of Scriptural Reasoning, edited by David Ford and C. C. Pecknold (Malden: Blackwell, 2006).
- "Ishmael and the Enlightenment's Crise de Coeur." In Scripture, Reason, and the Contemporary Islam-West Encounter, edited by Basit Bilal Koshul and Steven Kepnes (New York: Palgrave, 2007).
- "The Saint with Seven Tombs." In The Inner Journey: Views from the Islamic Tradition, edited by William Chittick (Ashgate: White Cloud Press, 2007).
- "Ibn Kemal (d. 940/1534) on Ibn 'Arabi's Hagiology." In Sufism and Theology, edited by Ayman Shihadeh (Edinburgh: Edinburgh University Press, 2007).
- “Poverty and the Charism of Ishmael.” In Building a Better Bridge: Muslims, Christians, and the Common Good, edited by Michael Ipgrave (Washington, DC: Georgetown University Press, 2009).
- “Jesus and Muhammad: New Convergences.” Muslim World 99/1 (2009): 21–38.
- “America as a Jihad State: Middle Eastern Perceptions of Modern American Theopolitics.” Muslim World 101 (2011): 394–411.
- "Opinion: Bin Laden's sea burial was 'sad miscalculation" CNN.com (9 May 2011).
- “Scorning the Prophet goes beyond free speech – it’s an act of violence” Daily Telegraph (17 Jan 2015).
