= Ali al-Jifri =

Islamic scholar (born 1971)

Sheikh Habib Ali Al-Jifri
- الحبيب علي زين العابدين الجفري
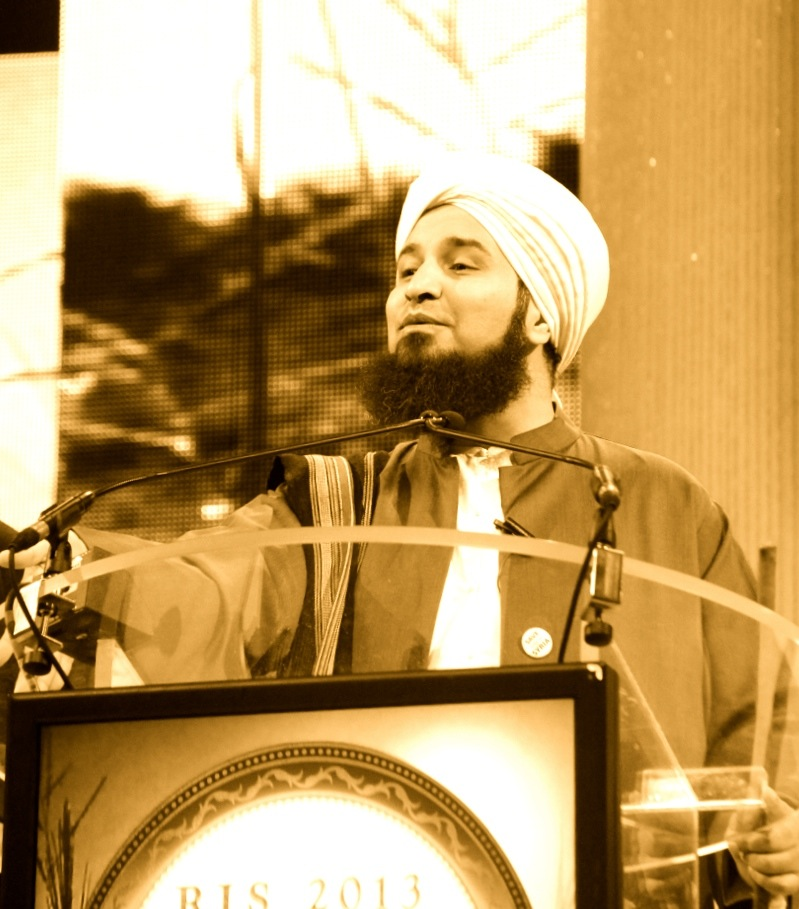
- Born: 16 April 1971 (age 55); Jeddah, Saudi Arabia
- Occupation: Islamic scholar
- Organization: Tabah Foundation
- Title: Shaykh Sayyid
- Website: www.alhabibali.com/en/

Habib Ali Zain al-Abidin al-Jifri (Arabic: الحبيب علي زين العابدين الجفري; born 16 April 1971) is a Yemeni Islamic scholar and spiritual educator based in Cairo, Egypt. He is the founder of Tabah Foundation (مؤسسة طابـة), a research institute based in Abu Dhabi, UAE.

== Early life ==
Ali Zain al-Abidin al-Jifri was born in the city of Jeddah, Saudi Arabia, on 16 April 1971 (20th Safar 1391 AH). Al-Jifri is a direct descendant of Muhammad through his grandson Husayn ibn Ali. He has written books including "The Concept of Faith in Islam."

== Awards and recognition ==
Since 2009, Al-Jifri has been listed as one of the top 50 most influential Muslims in the world by Georgetown University's Prince Alwaleed Bin Talal Center for Muslim-Christian Understanding and Royal Islamic Strategic Studies Centre of Jordan. and in 2023 was number 22. He was a recipient of the Eugen Biser award in 2008 for his contribution to the document A Common Word Between Us and You.
