= Zaytuna College =

Muslim liberal arts college in Berkeley, California

- Former name: Zaytuna Institute (1996–2008)
- Motto: و قـل رب زدنـي عـلـمـا (Arabic)
- Motto in English: "Say: O Lord, increase me in knowledge" (Sūrah Tā Hā 20:114)
- Type: Private liberal arts college
- Established: Zaytuna Institute: 1996; 30 years ago Zaytuna College: 2009
- Accreditation: WSCUC
- Religious affiliation: Sunni Islam
- Endowment: $2 million (2019)
- President: Hamza Yusuf
- Provost: Omar Qureshi
- Students: 50
- Location: Berkeley, California, United States; 37°53′50.8″N 122°15′33.6″W
- Campus: College Town, 10 acres (0.040 km^{2})
- Colors: Red
- Website: zaytuna.edu

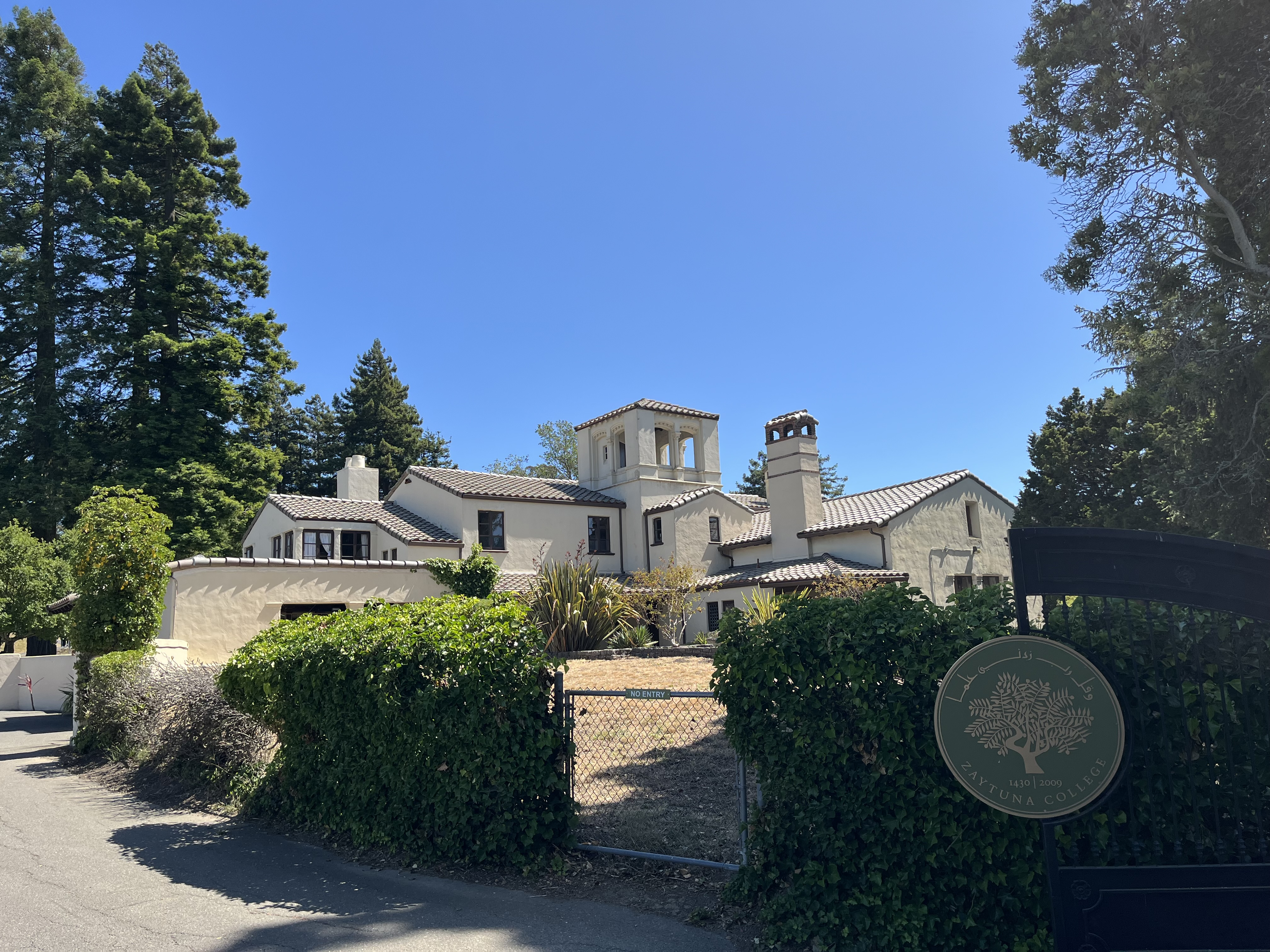
Exterior view of Zaytuna College's main campus building in Berkeley, California.

Zaytuna College /zaɪˈtuːnə/ is a private liberal arts college in Berkeley, California and is the first accredited Muslim undergraduate college in the United States. It was built on the foundation of an educational institute, founded in 1996 by Hamza Yusuf and Hesham Alalusi as Zaytuna Institute. It formally changed its name to Zaytuna College in 2009 after the graduation of its first seminary class.

Zaytuna College seeks to integrate the institutions of the American liberal arts college and traditional Islamic education, drawing on their shared roots in the classical liberal arts. In the academic year 2014–2015, Zaytuna College had an undergraduate student body of about fifty students, most of whom lived on campus.

Zaytuna College offers a BA in Liberal Arts & Islamic Studies and an MA in Islamic Texts. Courses range from Arabic grammar and Islamic jurisprudence, to American history and ancient literature.

== History ==
In 1996, Zaytuna Institute was founded by Hamza Yusuf and Hesham Alalusi and incorporated in California as a non-profit educational institute.

The college is named after the olive tree (Ar: زيتونة zaytūnah). Based in Hayward, the institute's mandate was to teach courses on Arabic and Islamic Studies as well as to engage in community service and outreach. These part-time courses were popular both locally and in recorded form, but there was demand for a full-time option. In 2004, Zaid Shakir and other instructors conducted a four-year pilot seminary project from which five students graduated. With this experience, Zaytuna considered a move to Berkeley to collaborate with established institutions such as the University of California, Berkeley and the Graduate Theological Union.

Following the graduation of its seminary class in 2008, Zaytuna Institute changed its name to Zaytuna College in 2009. The successful completion of the pilot program and a summer Arabic intensive course led to the inaugural undergraduate degree cohort in 2010, consisting of eight female and seven male students.

Upon its move to Berkeley, Zaytuna College rented space from the American Baptist Seminary of the West (ABSW). In July 2012, Zaytuna acquired its own campus on Berkeley's "Holy Hill", a location so named because it is host to a number of theological colleges and seminaries. In 2017, Zaytuna went on to acquire a second, larger location nearby, known as the Upper Campus.

When the college was first accredited in 2015, it was a first for an American Muslim college. It was initially accredited by the Western Association of Schools and Colleges for its BA in Liberal Arts & Islamic Studies and its non-degree Summer Arabic Intensive Program, which has since been integrated with the BA program. Zaytuna received further accreditation for its graduate program in 2018.

== Academics ==
As a denominational liberal arts college, Zaytuna College combines a Great Books approach to the liberal arts with elements of a traditional Muslim seminary education. There is a single undergraduate major, which is a Muslim analogue to the historic Greats degree at Oxford. The undergraduate degree is built on the classical model of the trivium (grammar, rhetoric, and logic), common to education in medieval Christendom and Islam, including staple ancient texts like the Isagoge of Porphyry. All students are required to take Arabic, so that they can read primary sources from the Muslim tradition in their original form. Some students supplement this with other languages, including Persian, Greek, and Biblical Hebrew according to their interests and research needs. In addition to their grounding in reasoning and language skills, students take courses including theology, philosophy, law, history and constitutional law.

The college's graduate program, the MA in Islamic Texts, is built on rigorous primary source readings of Muslim texts in their original languages and training in advanced research skills. Graduate students must pick between a philosophy-focused track or a law-focused track. They must then produce original research on their chosen topics. With this text-based approach, students in the MA program follow the traditional Muslim system of learning directly from a teacher who has studied the text, in a chain going back to the author. So far, it is the only American graduate program to feature this method. Zaytuna's faculty includes both Muslim and non-Muslim scholars, with a variety of educational backgrounds.

The college is accredited by the WASC Senior College and University Commission.

=== Educational philosophy ===
Zaytuna College is built on a classical liberal arts curriculum, influenced by the traditional Muslim and Scholastic systems as well as the Great Books course pioneered in the 20th century United States by John Erskine, Mortimer Adler, and Charles van Doren. Adler would go on to instruct founder Hamza Yusuf in philosophy and educational theory.

Through this synthesis, it aims to produce students who are educated in the Muslim tradition and conversant in the contemporary world alike. By doing so, it sees itself as a revival of the American denominational liberal arts college, with a Muslim ethos.

== See also ==
- List of Islamic educational institutions
