= Royal Aal al-Bayt Institute for Islamic Thought =

International Islamic interorganization

Royal Aal al-Bayt Institute for Islamic Thought مؤسسة آل البيت للفكر الإسلامي
- Parent institution: Royal Islamic Strategic Studies Centre
- Founder: Hussein Bin Talal
- Established: 1980; 46 years ago
- Chair: Prince Ghazi bin Muhammad
- Location: Amman, Jordan
- Website: aalalbayt.org

The Royal Aal al-Bayt Institute for Islamic Thought (RABIIT) is an international Islamic non-governmental, independent institute in Amman, Jordan.

The late King Hussein Bin Talal established the Institute in 1980, and entrusted it to Prince Hassan bin Talal. It passed on to Crown Prince Hamzah bin Al Hussein on August 8, 1999, and then to Prince Ghazi bin Muhammad, who is the chair of the board of trustees.

Fellows of the Institute attend a conference every 2–3 years. The last one was held in September 2010, under the title "Islam and the Environment".

The institute was the leading sponsor of the statements, The Amman Message and A Common Word Between Us and You.

== Royal Islamic Strategic Studies Centre ==
Royal Islamic Strategic Studies Centre المركز الملكي للبحوث والدراسات الإسلامية
- Established: 2007
- Location: Amman, Jordan
- Website: https://rissc.jo

The Royal Islamic Strategic Studies Centre is a research centre affiliated with the Royal Aal al-Bayt Institute for Islamic Thought. Its publications include:

- A Common Word Between Us and You
- The Amman Message
- Forty Hadith on Divine Mercy
- Jihad and the Islamic Law of War
- Warfare in The Qur’an
- Body Count
- The Holy Qur'an and the Environment
- Address to H.H. Pope Benedict XVI at the King Hussein Mosque, Amman, Jordan by H.R.H. Prince Ghazi bin Muhammad bin Talal
- Keys to Jerusalem
- The 500 Most Influential Muslims
