= Islam in Europe =

Muslim population share by country & region — Europe, c. 2020

Islam is the second-largest religion in Europe after Christianity. Although the majority of Muslim communities in Western Europe formed as a result of recent post-WW2 immigration, there are centuries-old European Muslim communities in the Balkans, Caucasus, Crimea, and Volga region. The term "Muslim Europe" is used to refer to the Muslim-majority countries in the Balkans and the Caucasus (Albania, Azerbaijan, Bosnia and Herzegovina, Kosovo, and Turkey) and parts of countries in Central and Eastern Europe with sizable Muslim minorities (Bulgaria, Montenegro, North Macedonia, and some republics of Russia) that constitute large populations of European Muslims, although the majority are secular.

Islam expanded into the Caucasus through the Muslim conquest of Persia in the 7th century and entered Southern Europe after the Umayyad conquest of Hispania in the 8th–10th centuries; Muslim political entities existed firmly in what is today Spain, Portugal, Sicily, and Malta during the Middle Ages. The Muslim populations in these territories were either converted to Christianity or expelled by the end of the 15th century by the indigenous Christian rulers (see Reconquista). The Ottoman Empire expanded into Southeastern Europe and consolidated its political power by invading and conquering huge portions of the Serbian and Bulgarian empires, and the remaining territories of the region, including the Albanian and Romanian principalities, and the kingdoms of Bosnia, Croatia, and Hungary between the 14th and 16th centuries. Over the centuries, the Ottoman Empire gradually lost its European territories. Islam was particularly influential in the territories of Albania, Bosnia and Herzegovina, and Kosovo, and has remained the dominant religion in these countries.

During the Middle Ages, Islam spread in parts of Central and Eastern Europe through the Islamization of several Turkic ethnic groups, such as the Cumans, Kipchaks, Tatars, and Volga Bulgars under the Mongol invasions and conquests in Eurasia, and later under the Golden Horde and its successor khanates, with its various Muslim populations collectively referred to as "Turks" or "Tatars". These groups had a strong presence in present-day European Russia, Hungary, and Ukraine during the High Medieval Period.

Historically significant Muslim populations in Europe include Ashkali, Balkars, Bashkirs, Bosniaks, Böszörmény, Balkan Turks, Chechens, Circassians, Cretan Turks, Crimean Tatars, Gajals, Gorani, Greek Muslims, Ingush, Karachays, Khalyzians, Lipka Tatars, Muslim Albanians, Pomaks, Torbeshi, Turkish Cypriots, Vallahades, Volga Bulgars, Volga Tatars, Xoroxane, Yörüks, and Megleno-Romanians from Notia today living in East Thrace.

== History ==
The Muslim population in Europe is extremely diverse with varied histories and origins. Today, the Muslim-majority regions of Europe include several countries in the Balkans (Albania, Bosnia and Herzegovina, Kosovo, and the European part of Turkey), some Russian republics in the North Caucasus and the Idel-Ural region, and the European part of Kazakhstan. These communities consist predominantly of indigenous Europeans of the Muslim faith, whose religious tradition dates back several hundred years to the Middle Ages. The transcontinental countries of Turkey, Azerbaijan, and Kazakhstan are also majority Muslim.

=== Balkans ===
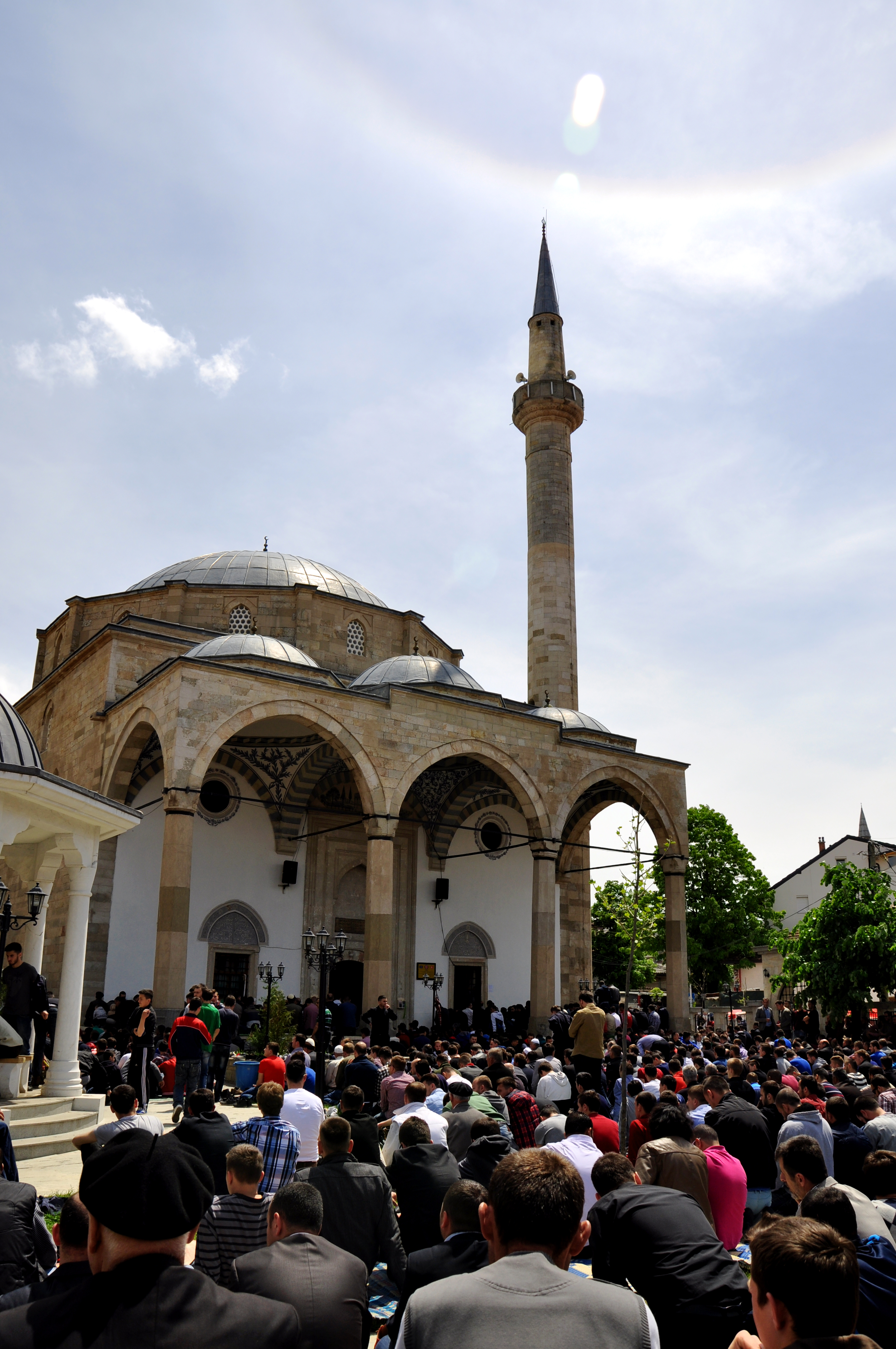
The King's Mosque in Pristina, Kosovo

==== Albania and Kosovo ====
Albanian rebels capturing Skopje in August 1912

In medieval Albania, the rebellion against the Ottomans had already been smouldering for years before Skanderbeg deserted the Ottoman army. The most notable earlier revolt was revolt of 1432–36 led principally by Gjergj Arianiti. Although Skanderbeg was summoned by his relatives during this rebellion, he remained loyal to the sultan and did not fight the Ottomans. After this rebellion was suppressed by the Ottomans, Arianiti again revolted against the Ottomans in the region of central Albania in August 1443.

Skanderbeg decided to leave his position of Ottoman sanjakbey and revolt against the Ottomans only after the victorious Crusade of Varna in 1443. Successes of the crusaders inspired revolt of Skanderbeg and revolt of Constantine XI Palaiologos in the Despotate of the Morea. In early November 1443, Skanderbeg deserted the forces of Sultan Murad II during the Battle of Nish, while fighting against the crusaders of John Hunyadi. Skanderbeg quit the field along with 300 other Albanians serving in the Ottoman army. He immediately led his men to Krujë, where he arrived on November 28, and by the use of a forged letter from Sultan Murad to the Governor of Krujë he became lord of the city. To reinforce his intention of gaining control of the former domains of Zeta, Skanderbeg proclaimed himself the heir of the Balšić noble family. After capturing some less important surrounding castles (Petrela, Prezë, Guri i Bardhë, Svetigrad, Modrič and others) and eventually gaining control over more than his father Gjon Kastrioti's domains, Skanderbeg abjured Islam and proclaimed himself the avenger of his family and country. He raised a red flag with a black double-headed eagle on it: Albania uses a similar flag as its national symbol to this day.

Until September 1912, the Ottoman government intentionally kept Albanians divided within four ethnically heterogeneous vilayets in order to prevent the national unification of Albania. The reforms introduced by the Young Turks provoked the Albanian Revolt, which lasted from January to August 1912. In January 1912, Hasan Prishtina, an Albanian deputy in the Ottoman parliament, publicly warned members of the parliament that the policy of the Young Turks' government would lead to a revolution in Albania. The Albanian revolt was successful and until August 1912 rebels managed to gain control over whole Kosovo vilayet (including Novi Pazar, Sjenica, Pristina and even Skopje), a part of the Scutari Vilayet (including Elbasan, Përmet and Leskovik), Konitsa in Janina Vilayet and Debar in Monastir Vilayet. The Ottoman government ended the Albanian revolt on 4 September 1912 by accepting all demands related to establishing an unified autonomous system of administration and justice for Albanians within one vilayet—the Albanian vilayet.

The international relations of Albania began to function on a state level after it was proclaimed independent and the first diplomatic efforts of its government were requests for the international recognition of the Albanian state. In December 1912, a delegation of Albania submitted a memorandum to the London Conference of 1913 insisting on the ethnic rights of Albanians and requested an international recognition of the independent Albania composed of Kosovo, western Macedonia including Skopje and Bitola and the whole territory of Epirus up to Arta.

==== Bosnia and Herzegovina ====
After the fall in 1463, herceg Stjepan Vukčić, lord of the Hum province in the south of the medieval Kingdom of Bosnia, lived for another three years, long enough to see kingdom's complete demise, for which he blamed his eldest son Vladislav Hercegović. On 21 May 1466, old and terminally ill, the duke dictated his last words, recorded in a testament, and condemned Vladislav by saying that it was him who "brought the great Turk to Bosnia to the death and destruction of us all", after which the duke died the following day.

He was succeeded as herceg by his second and younger son Vlatko Hercegović, who struggled to retain as much of the territory he could. However, Blagaj, Kosača capital, fell in 1466, while Ključ fort between Nevesinje and Gacko was cut off from the main part of his territory, although Vlatko's actions against Ottomans were mostly concentrated around this fort with limited success. Počitelj fell in 1471, however, herceg Vlatko already in 1470 realized that only radical change in his politics could bring him some release, so he pursued and achieved a peace with the Ottomans. In the same year, the Ottomans excluded Hum from the Bosnian Sanjak, and established a new, separate sanjak with its seat in Foča, Sanjak of Herzegovina.
The very last remnants of Bosnian state territory were these stretches of land held by Vlatko in Hum, while he moved residence to his last capital, Novi. He also gave up his agreement with Ottomans, after just a few years or so, just about the same time when his younger brother, Stjepan, assumed highest office of the Ottoman navy as Ahmed Pasha Hercegović (around 1473) in Istanbul. After his marriage in 1474, he reconciled with his older brother Vladislav. Just before death of Sultan Mehmed II, Vlatko tried one more push to the heart of Bosnia, but abandoned by his allies his venture ended in disaster, after which he completely and finitely withdraws to his fortress in Novi. Meanwhile, all this, along with death of Mehmed II, prompted new sultan, Bayezid II, to overtake Novi and its harbor, along with whatever territory remained. In November 1481, Ajaz-Bey of the Sanjak of Herzegovina besieged Novi, however, just before 14 December 1481 Vlatko gave up resisting, and agreed with the Ottomans to move with his family to Istanbul. This signified the ultimate disappearance of what was the last remaining independent point of the Bosnian state.
So, the province endured for another fifteen years after Stjepan Vukčić's death, shrinking with time, before it was eventually swallowed by the Ottomans in December 1481, and incorporated into the empire as re-organized territory of already formed and renamed province, Sanjak of Herzegovina.

In November 1481, Ajaz-Bey of the Sanjak of Herzegovina besieged Vlatko's capital Novi but just before 14 December 1481, Vlatko ceased resisting and agreed with the Ottomans to move with his family to Istanbul. Now the entirety of Herzegovina was reorganized into the already established Sanjak of Herzegovina with the seat in Foča, and later, in 1580, would become one of the sanjaks of the Bosnia Eyalet. This signified the disappearance of the last-remaining independent point of the medieval Bosnian state.

Hungarian rulers perceived Bosnia as a country under their sovereignty during medieval time. Bosnian rulers acted completely independently in carrying out state and diplomatic affairs, governing the judicial system, granting towns and estates, minting coins, exploiting natural resources, and making trading agreements with other countries and independent cities. As a main trading partner of the Bosnian state, the Ragusa referred to the Bosnian Kingdom as a separate state ("rusag"), for example in a charter issued to Sandalj Hranić in November 1405, where they articulated that the Ragusan merchants would be safe across the "Bosnian rusag", or 1451, during the war with Stjepan Vukčić, as a "Holy Kingdom". Ragusans also paid Saint Demetrius an income of 2000 Ragusan perpera. Ladislaus of Naples acknowledged the territories of the kingdom on 26 August 1406 at the request of Tvrtko II.

==== Bulgaria ====
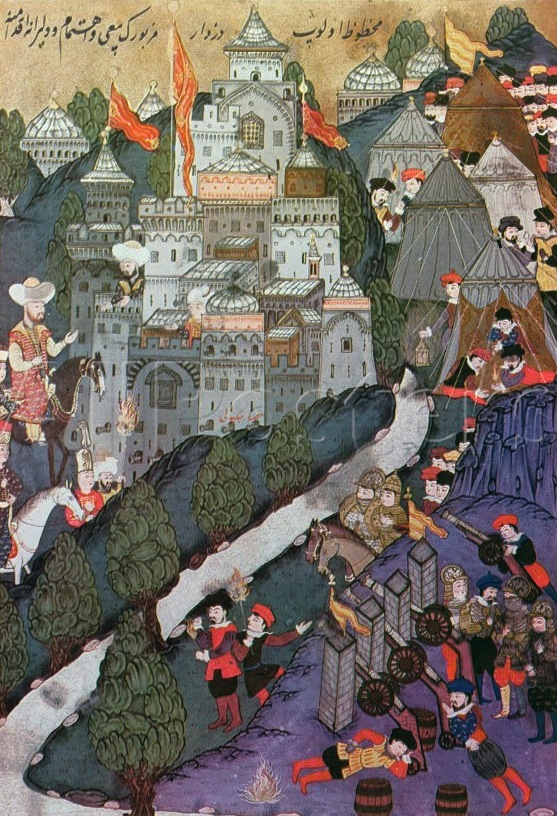
Battle of Nicopolis in the year 1396

The Ottomans reorganised the Bulgarian territories, dividing them into several vilayets, each ruled by a Sanjakbey or Subasi accountable to the Beylerbey. Significant parts of the conquered land were parcelled out to the Sultan's followers, who held it as benefices or fiefs (small timar, medium zeamet and large hass) directly from him, or from the Beylerbeys. This category of land could not be sold or inherited but reverted to the Sultan when the fiefholder died. The lands were organised as private possessions of the Sultan or Ottoman nobility, called "mülk", and also as an economic base for religious foundations, called vakιf, as well as other people. The system was meant to make the army self-sufficient and to continuously increase the number of Ottoman cavalry soldiers, thus both fuelling new conquests and bringing conquered countries under direct Ottoman control.

From the 14th century until the 19th century Sofia was an important administrative centre in the Ottoman Empire. It became the capital of the beylerbeylik of Rumelia (Rumelia Eyalet), the province that administered the Ottoman lands in Europe (the Balkans), one of the two together with the beylerbeylik of Anatolia. It was the capital of the important Sanjak of Sofia as well, including the whole of Thrace with Plovdiv and Edirne, and part of Macedonia with Thessaloniki and Skopje. The Danube Vilayet was a first-level administrative division (vilayet) of the Ottoman Empire from 1864 to 1878 with a capital in Ruse. In the late 19th century it reportedly had an area of 34,120 square miles (88,400 km^{2}) and incorporated the Vidin Eyalet, Silistra Eyalet, and Niš Eyalet.

The April Uprising was an insurrection organised by the Bulgarians in the Ottoman Empire from April to May 1876. The rebellion was suppressed by irregular Ottoman bashi-bazouk units that engaged in indiscriminate slaughter of both rebels and non-combatants (see Batak massacre). The April uprising was not successful in itself, but its bloody suppression by the Ottomans caused such outrage across Europe that public opinion, even in Turcophile England, shifted, demanding a reform of the model of Ottoman governance. As a result, the Great Powers called the Constantinople Conference in December 1876, where they presented the Sultan with a combined proposal that envisaged the creation of two autonomous Bulgarian provinces, largely overlapping with the borders of the Bulgarian Exarchate. By splitting the autonomy in two and ensuring extensive international oversight of provincial affairs, the proposal reflected all of the British Empire's wishes and allayed its fears that the provinces would become Russian puppets.

Thus, the decades-long Bulgarian struggle for self-governance and freedom appeared to finally bear fruit. And this the Bulgarians had achieved entirely by themselves—through the efforts of both clergy and the young Bulgarian bourgeoisie, which had successfully argued before and succeeded in convincing Grand Vizier Âli Pasha in the need for a separate Bulgarian church and millet, thus initiating the Bulgarian nation-building process even under foreign rule, and through the blood shed by the hothead revolutionaries who had managed to cause a seismic shift in European public opinion. Bulgaria had been a widely autonomous principality since 13 July 1878 Congress of Berlin and the end of the Russo-Turkish War (1877–78). Although it was still technically under the suzerainty of the Sublime Porte, this was a legal fiction that Bulgaria only acknowledged in a formal way. It acted largely as a de facto independent state with its own constitution, flag, anthem and currency, and conducted a separate foreign policy. On 18 September [O.S. 6 September] 1885, it had unified with the Bulgarian-majority Ottoman autonomous province of Eastern Rumelia. The de jure independence of Bulgaria from the Ottoman Empire was proclaimed on 5 October [O.S. 22 September] 1908 in the old capital of Tarnovo by Prince Ferdinand of Bulgaria, who afterwards took the title "Tsar".

==== Croatia ====
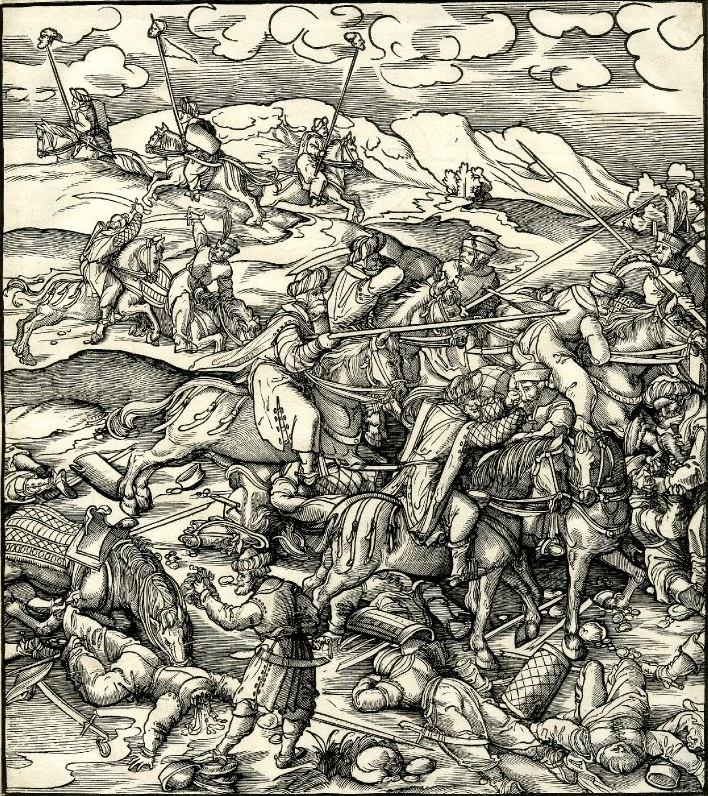
The woodcut by Leonhard Beck, from c. 1515, depicts the Battle of Krbava Field between the army of Croatian nobility and Ottoman akinji.

Serious Ottoman attacks on Croatian lands began after the fall of Bosnia to the Ottoman Turks in 1463. At this point main Ottoman attacks were not yet directed towards Central Europe, with Vienna as its main objective, but towards renaissance Italy with Croatia standing on their way between. As the Ottomans launched expansion further into Europe, Croatian lands became a place of permanent warfare. This period of history is considered to be one of the direst for the people living in Croatia. Baroque poet Pavao Ritter Vitezović subsequently described this period of Croatian history as "two centuries of weeping Croatia".

Armies of Croatian nobility fought numerous battles to counter the Ottoman akinji and martolos raids. The Ottoman forces frequently raided the Croatian countryside, plundering towns and villages and captured the local inhabitants as slaves. These "scorched earth" tactics, also called "The Small War", were usually conducted once a year with intention to soften up the region's defenses, but didn't result in actual conquest of territory. According to historian James Tracy, the armies Croatian ban could muster proved too few to counter akinji raids along the long border with the Ottoman Empire. On the other hand, armies of Croatian nobility could never mobilize fast enough to intercept akinji raids "head on", instead, Croatians hoped to intercept Ottoman raiders on their return, as they were slowed down by their booty and hostages.

And after conquering Greece and Bulgaria, Bosnia and Albania, [Turks] flocked onto people of Croatia by sending many armies. Many warlords started frequent battles with Christian people fighting on the fields and in mountain passes and on river fords. That's when all Croatian and Slavonian lands were enslaved all the way to Sava river and Drava and even Mons Claudius, all settlements of Carniola all the way to sea, by enslaving, robbing, burning houses of Lord and crushing Lord's altars. They attacked old people using weapons, young women [...] widows and even squealing children; not only that they took people of God in violent sorrow, shackled in chains, but they also sold people on markets like it is accustomed to do with the cattle.

— The Record of Father Martinac, 15th century Croatian scribe

Meanwhile, after king Mathias Corvinus died in 1490, a succession war ensued, where supporters of Vladislaus Jagiellon prevailed over those of Maximilian Habsburg, another contester to the throne of Kingdom of Hungary-Croatia. Maximilian gained many supporters among Croatian nobility and a favourable peace treaty he concluded with Vladislaus enabled Croatians to increasingly turn towards Habsburgs when seeking protections from the Ottoman attacks, as their lawful king Vladislaus turned out unable to protect his subjects in Croatia. On same year, the estates of Croatia also declined to recognize Vladislaus II as a ruler until he had taken an oath to respect their liberties and insisted that he strike from the constitution certain phrases which seemed to reduce Croatia to the rank of a mere province. The dispute was resolved in 1492 when according to Lujo Margetić, king Vladislaus recognised the autonomy of both Croatia and Slavonia, whose nobility gave a separate confirmation to the succession agreement between Vladislaus and the house of Habsburg, enabling Croatians and Slavonians to have their say in future interregnum periods.

==== Hungary ====
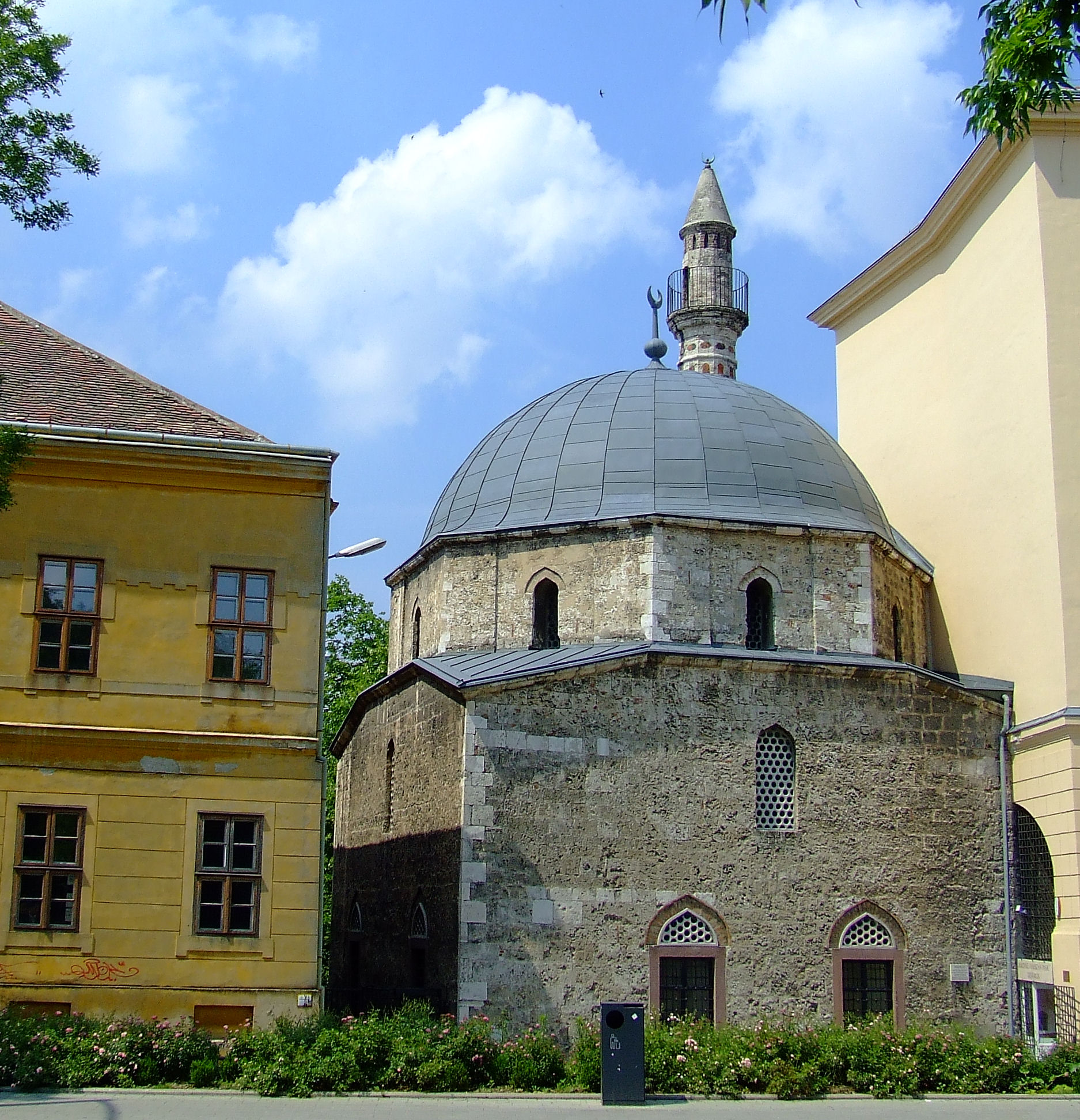
Yakovalı Hasan Paşa Mosque in Pécs

Islam was practiced by a sizeable minority of the conquering Hungarians, who arrived in the territory of present-day Hungary at the end of the 9th century. Muslims in early Hungary were known as Böszörmény, Khalyzians, Saracens, and Ishmaelites. The biggest Muslim settlement was near the town of present-day Orosháza in the central part of the Hungarian Kingdom. This settlement, entirely populated by Muslims, was likely one of the biggest settlements of the early Kingdom. This and several other Muslim settlements were destroyed with their inhabitants massacred during the 1241 Mongol invasion of Hungary and Muslims were later mandated to become Christian by Charles I of Hungary.

The country was reintroduced to Islam via the Ottoman Empire, particularly when it was under Ottoman rule. Following the end of Ottoman rule in Hungary, the country continued to border the Ottoman Empire, and experienced various influxes of migration of Bosniak, Albanian and Turkish Muslims.

==== Seljuks ====
As a result of Babai revolt, in 1261, one of the Turkoman dervish Sari Saltuk was forced to take refuge in the Byzantine Empire, alongside 40 Turkoman clans. He was settled in Dobruja, whence he entered the service of the powerful Muslim Mongol emir, Nogai Khan. Sari Saltuk became the hero of an epic, as a dervish and ghazi spreading Islam into Europe.

==== Ottomans ====
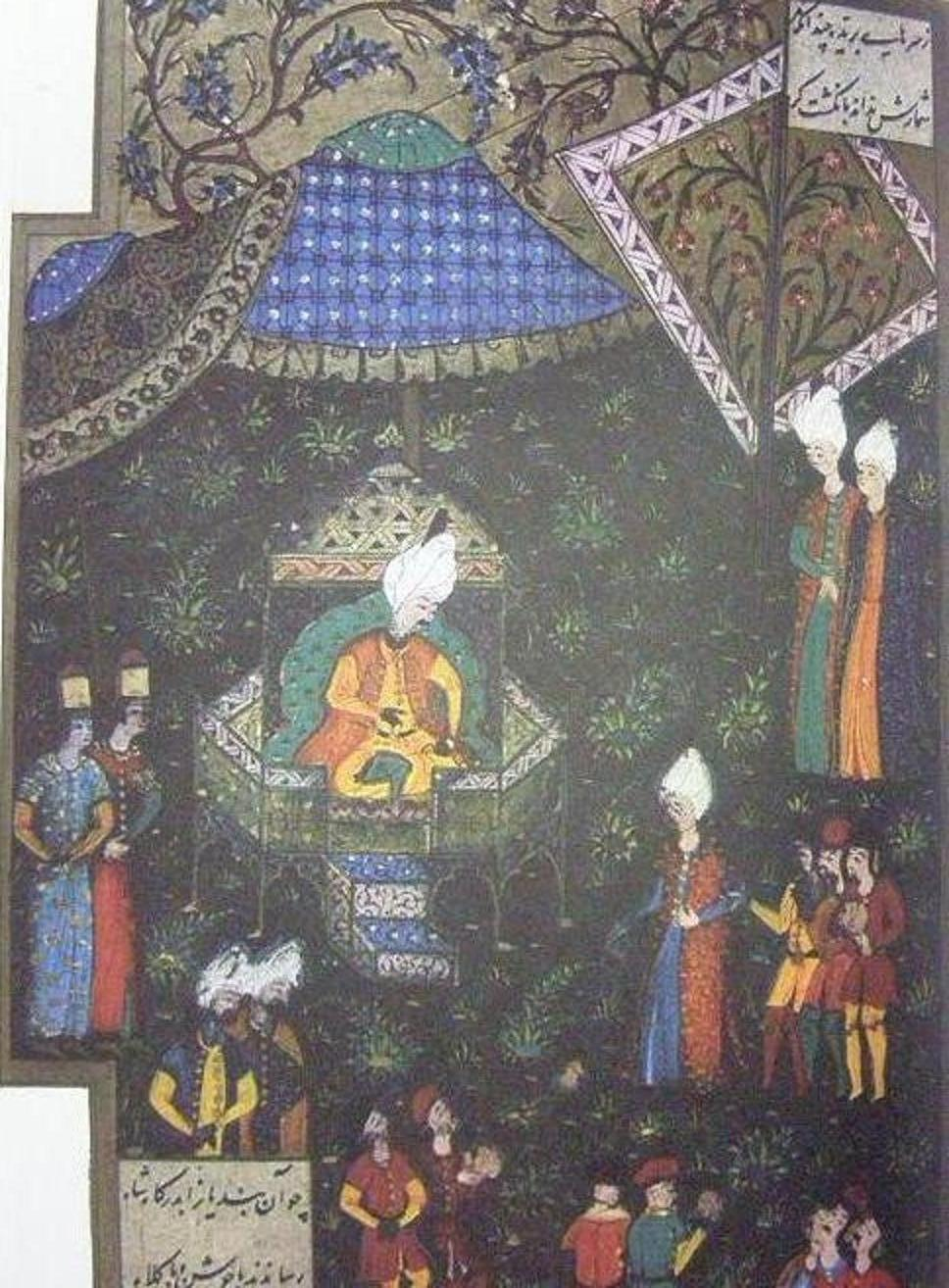
The Ottoman sultan Suleiman the Magnificent awaits the arrival of the Greek Muslim Grand Vizier Pargalı Ibrahim Pasha at Buda, in 1529.

The Ottoman Empire began its expansion into Europe by invading the European portions of the Byzantine Empire in the 14th and 15th centuries up until the capture of Constantinople in 1453, establishing Islam as the state religion of the newly-founded empire. The Ottoman Turks further expanded into Southeastern Europe and consolidated their political power by invading and conquering huge portions of the Serbian Empire, Bulgarian Empire, and the remaining territories of the Byzantine Empire in the 14th and 15th centuries. During the 16th and 17th centuries, the empire absorbed the territory of present-day Hungary and the vast majority of present-day Croatia. The territory of present-day Moldova was also absorbed within an Ottoman vassal state. The empire continued to stretch northwards, reaching as far north as present-day southern Slovakia and southwestern Ukraine in the mid-17th century. By the time the Peace of Buczacz was signed with the Polish–Lithuanian Commonwealth in 1672, most of the Balkans was under Ottoman control. Ottoman expansion in Europe ended with their defeat in the Great Turkish War in 1699. Over the centuries, the Ottoman Empire gradually lost almost all of its European territories, until it was defeated and eventually collapsed in 1922.

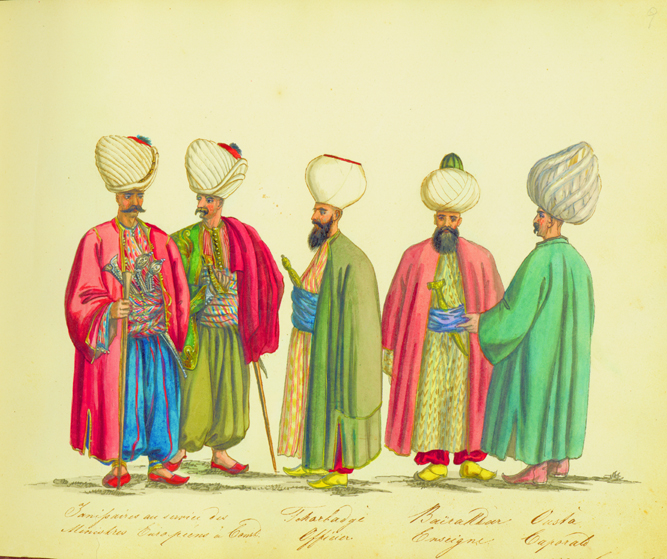
Medieval Bulgaria, particularly the city of Sofia, was the administrative centre of almost all Ottoman possessions in the Balkans, comprising a region known at the time as Rumelia.

Between 1354 (when the Ottoman Turks crossed into Europe at Gallipoli) and 1526, the Empire had conquered the territories of present-day Albania, Bosnia and Herzegovina, Bulgaria, Greece, Hungary, Kosovo, Montenegro, North Macedonia, Romania, and Serbia. The Empire laid siege to Vienna in 1683. The intervention of the Polish King broke the siege, and from then afterwards the Ottomans battled the Habsburg Emperors until 1699, when the Treaty of Karlowitz forced them to surrender the region of Hungary under Ottoman control and portions of present-day Croatia, Romania, Slovakia, and Serbia to the Habsburg Empire, which pushed the Great Migrations of the Serbs to the southern regions of the Kingdom of Hungary (though as far in the north as the town of Szentendre, in which they formed the majority of the population in the 18th century, but to smaller extent also in the town of Komárom) and Habsburg-ruled Croatia.

==== Slavery, slave trade, and conversions ====
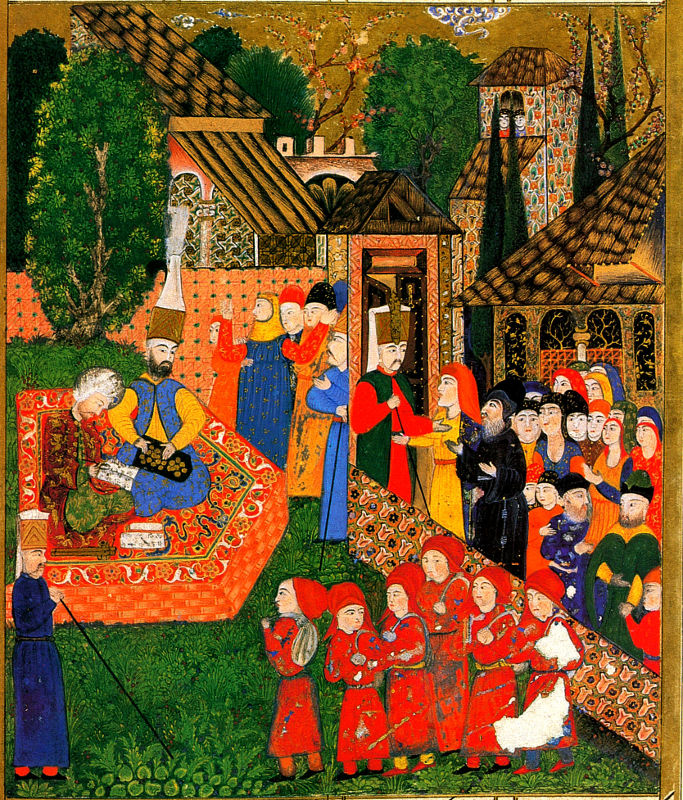
Registration of Christian boys for the tribute in blood. Ottoman miniature painting, 1558.

The slave trade in the Ottoman Empire supplied the ranks of the Ottoman army between the 15th and 19th centuries. They were useful in preventing both the slave rebellions and the breakup of the Empire itself, especially due to the rising tide of nationalism among European peoples in its Balkan provinces from the 17th century onwards. Along with the Balkans, the Black Sea Region remained a significant source of high-value slaves for the Ottomans.

Apart from the effect of a lengthy period under Ottoman domination, many of the subject populations were periodically and forcefully converted to Islam as a result of a deliberate move by the Ottoman Turks as part of a policy of ensuring the loyalty of the population against a potential Venetian invasion. However, Islam was spread by force in the areas under the control of the Ottoman sultan through the devşirme system of child levy enslavement, by which indigenous European Christian boys from the Balkans (predominantly Albanians, Bulgarians, Croats, Greeks, Romanians, Serbs, and Ukrainians) were taken, levied, subjected to forced circumcision and forced conversion to Islam, and incorporated into the Ottoman army, and jizya taxes.

=== Southern Europe ===
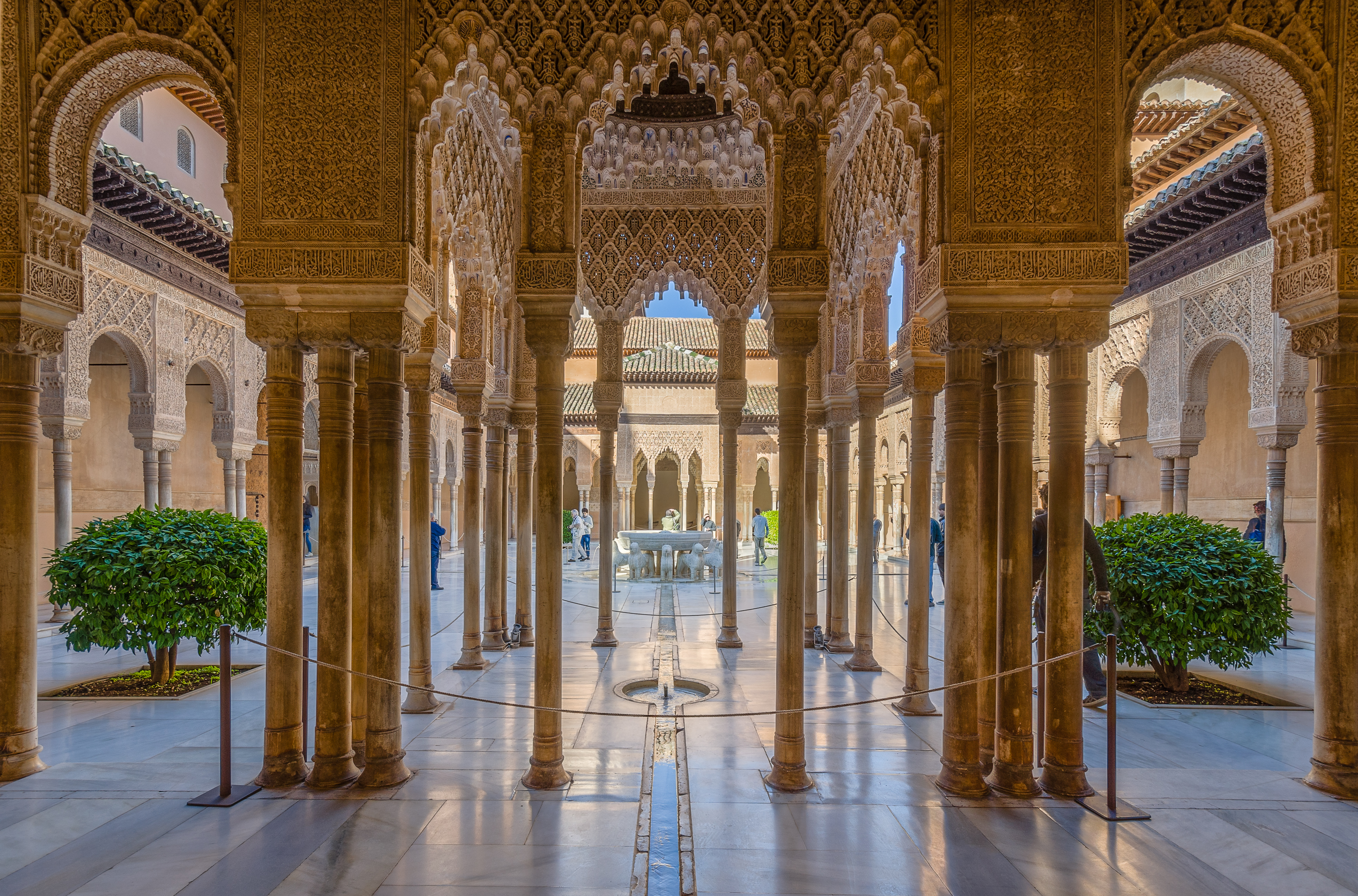
Court of the Lions, located in the historic citadel of Alhambra in Granada, Spain.

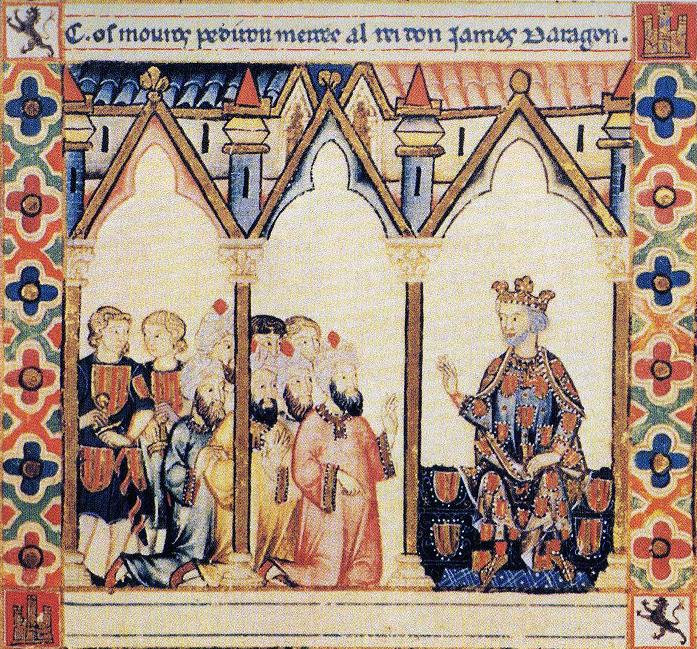
The Moors request permission from King James I of Aragon (13th century)

Arab Muslim forays into Europe began shortly after the foundation of Islam in the 7th century CE. Soon after the death of Muhammad in 632 CE, his community needed to appoint a new leader, giving rise to the title of caliph (Arabic: خَليفة, romanized: khalīfa, lit. 'successor'), which was claimed by some of Muhammad's closest companions (ṣaḥāba) and their descendants over the succession for the role of caliph throughout the centuries. The four "rightly-guided" (rāshidūn) caliphs who succeeded him oversaw the initial phase of the early Muslim conquests, advancing through Persia, the Levant, Egypt, and North Africa.

The early Muslim conquests expanded westwards, and within less than a century encompassed parts of the European continent. Arab Muslim forces easily prevailed over the Byzantine army in the crucial battles of Ajnâdayn (634 CE) and Yarmûk (636 CE), and incorporated the former Byzantine province of Syria, pushing to the north and west. At the same time, consolidation of the hold of Islam by the Arab empires in North Africa and the Middle East was soon to be followed by incursions into what is now Europe, as Arab and Berber Muslim armies raided and eventually conquered territories leading to the establishment of Muslim-ruled states on the European continent.

A short-lived invasion of Byzantine Sicily by a small Arab and Berber contingent that landed in 652 was the prelude of a series of incursions; from the 8th to the 15th centuries, Muslim states ruled parts of the Iberian Peninsula, southern Italy, southern France, and several Mediterranean islands, while in the East, incursions into a much reduced in territory and weakened Byzantine Empire continued. In the 720s and 730s, Arab and Berber Muslim forces fought and raided north of the Pyrenees, well into what is now France, reaching as north as Tours, where they were eventually defeated and repelled by the Christian Franks in 732 to their Iberian and North African territories.

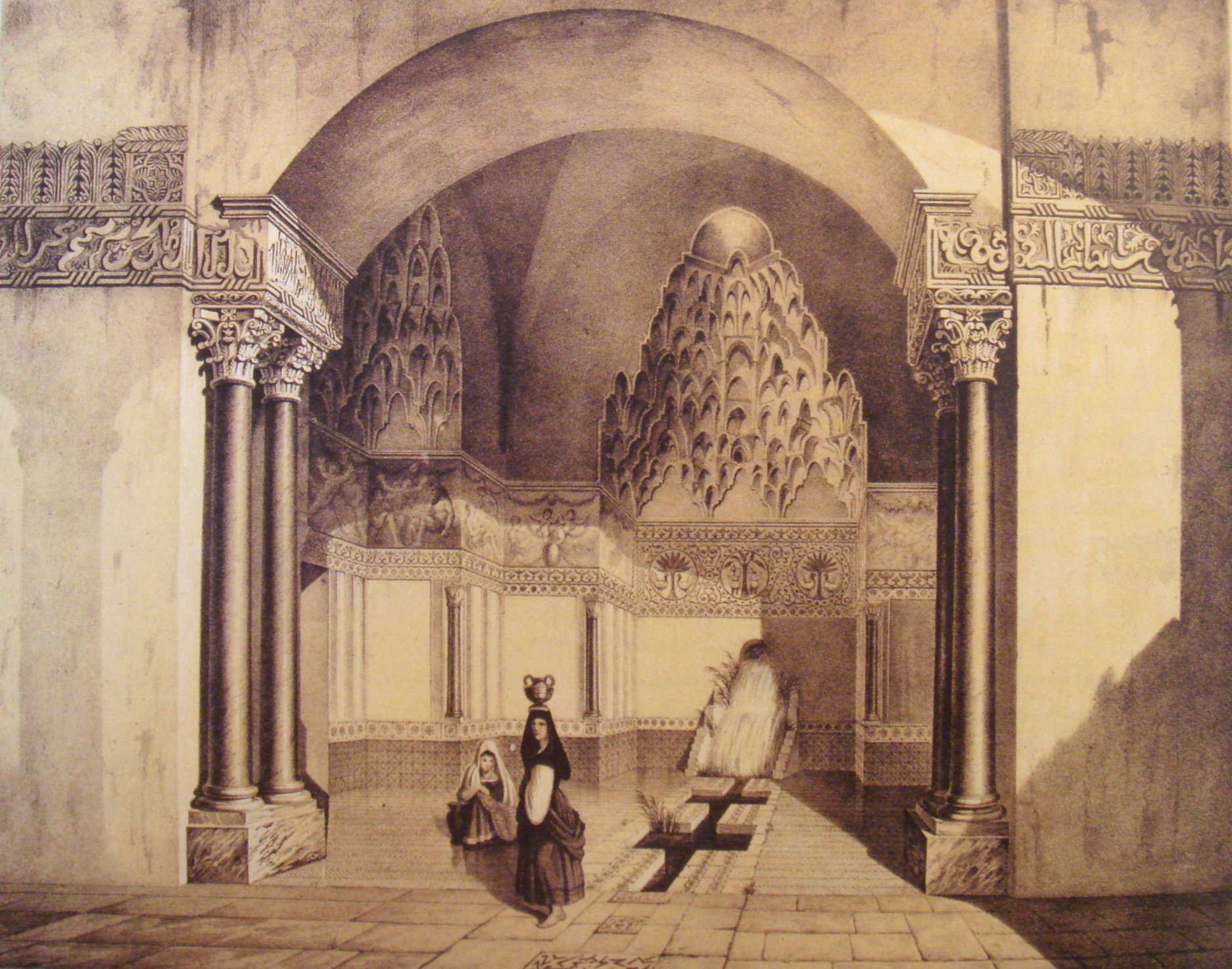
Norman–Arab–Byzantine art and architecture combined Occidental features (such as the Classical pillars and friezes) with typical Arabic decorations and calligraphy, following the Norman conquest of the former Emirate of Sicily and North Africa.

Islam gained its first genuine foothold in continental Europe from 711 onward, with the Umayyad conquest of Hispania. The Arabs renamed the land al-Andalus, which expanded to include the larger parts of what is now Portugal and Spain, excluding the northern highlands. Arab and Berber Muslim forces established various emirates in Europe after the invasion of southern Iberia and the foundation of al-Andalus. One notable emirate was the Emirate of Crete, a Muslim-ruled state and center of Muslim piratical activity that existed on the Mediterranean island of Crete from the late 820s until the Byzantine reconquest of the island in 961, when the Byzantine Emperor Nikephoros II Phokas defeated and expelled the Muslim Arabs and Berbers from Crete for the Byzantine Empire, and made the island into a theme. The other was the Emirate of Sicily, which existed on the eponymous island from 831 to 1091; Muslim Arabs and Berbers held onto Sicily and other regions of southern Italy until they were eventually defeated and expelled by the Christian Normans in 1072 to their Iberian and North African territories.

The presence of a Muslim majority in North Africa and the Iberian Peninsula by the foundation of al-Andalus and other Muslim-ruled states in the Mediterranean Region between the 7th and 10th centuries CE is debated among scholars and historians; one author claims that al-Andalus had a Muslim majority after most of the local population allegedly converted to Islam on their own will, whereas other historians remark how the Umayyad Caliphate persecuted many Berber Christians in the 7th and 8th centuries CE, who slowly converted to Islam. Modern historians further recognize that the Christian populations living in the lands invaded by the Arab Muslim armies between the 7th and 10th centuries CE suffered religious persecution, religious violence, and martyrdom multiple times at the hands of Arab Muslim officials and rulers; many were executed under the Islamic death penalty for defending their Christian faith through dramatic acts of resistance such as refusing to convert to Islam, repudiation of the Islamic religion and subsequent reconversion to Christianity, and blasphemy towards Muslim beliefs. The martyrdom of forty-eight Iberian Christians that took place under the rule of Abd al-Rahman II and Muhammad I in the Emirate of Córdoba (between 850 and 859 CE) has been recorded in historical documents and treatises of the time.

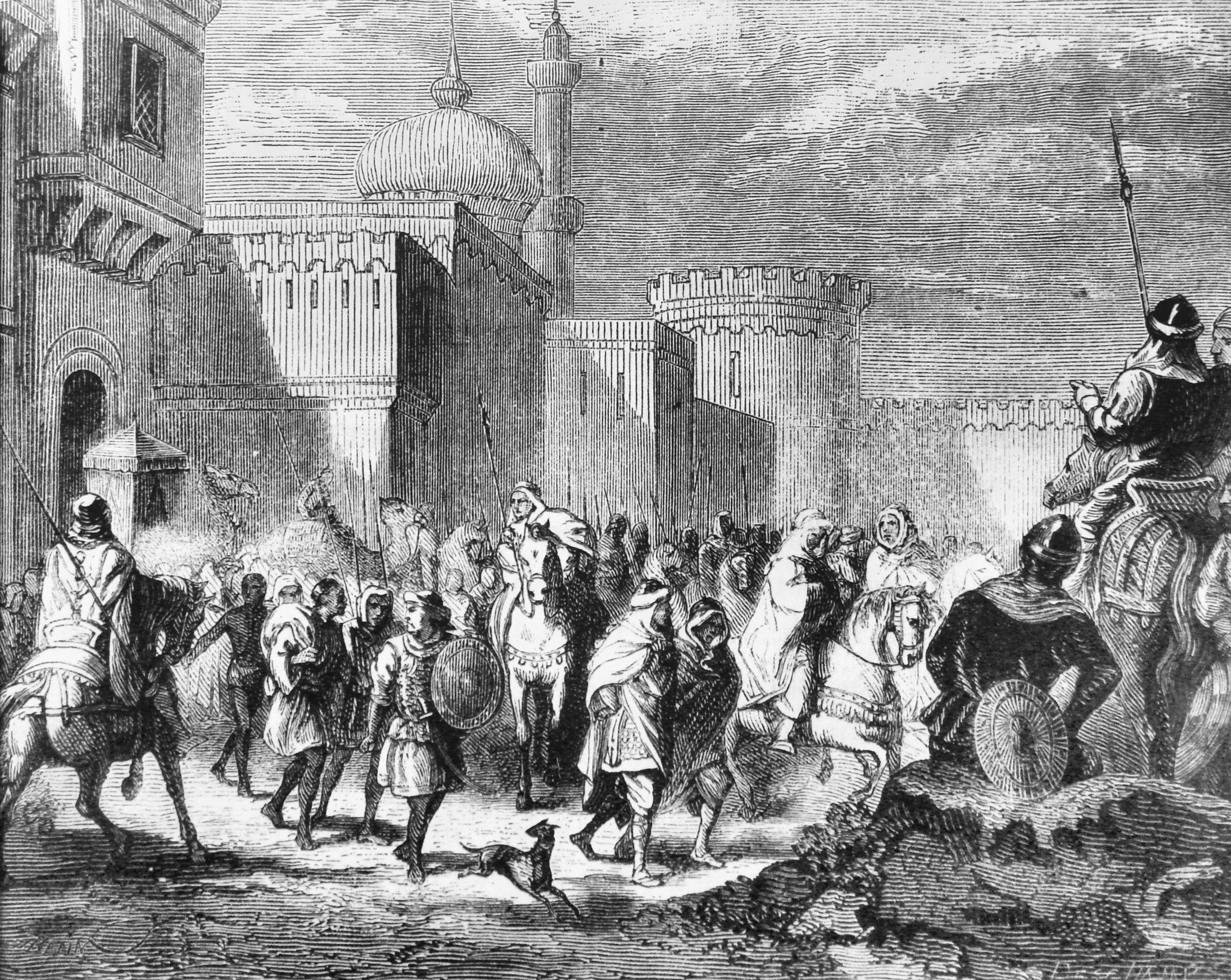
Arab and Berber Muslim troops retreating from Narbonne after the Frankish conquest of Septimania in 759. Illustration by Émile Bayard, 1880.

This coincided with the La Convivencia period of the Iberian Peninsula as well as the Golden age of Jewish culture in Spain. In Francia, the Arab and Berber Muslim forces invaded the region of Septimania in 719 and deposed the local Visigothic Kingdom in 720; after the Frankish conquest of Narbonne in 759, the Muslim Arabs and Berbers were defeated by the Christian Franks and retreated to their Andalusian heartland after 40 years of occupation, and the Carolingian king Pepin the Short came up reinforced. The Iberian Christian counter-offensive known as the Reconquista began in the early 8th century, when Muslim forces managed to temporarily push into Aquitaine. Slowly, the Christian forces began a re-conquest of the fractured Taifa kingdoms in al-Andalus. There was still a Muslim presence north of Spain, especially in Fraxinet all the way into Switzerland until the 10th century. Muslim forces under the Aghlabids conquered Sicily after a series of expeditions spanning 827–902, and had notably raided Rome in 846. By 1236, practically all that remained of Muslim-ruled Iberia was the southern province of Granada.

Since they are considered "People of the Book" in the Islamic religion, Christians and Jews under Muslim rule were subjected to the status of dhimmi (along with Samaritans, Gnostics, Mandeans, and Zoroastrians in the Middle East), which was inferior to the status of Muslims. Arab Muslims imposed the Islamic law (sharīʿa) in these Muslim-ruled countries; thus, the Latin- and Greek-speaking European Christian populations, as well as the Jewish communities of Europe, faced religious discrimination and persecution due to being considered religious minorities; they were further banned from proselytising (for Christians, it was forbidden to evangelize or spread Christianity) in the lands invaded by the Arab Muslims on pain of death, they were banned from bearing arms, undertaking certain professions, and were obligated to dress differently in order to distinguish themselves from Arabs. Under the Islamic law (sharīʿa), Non-Muslims were obligated to pay the jizya and kharaj taxes, together with periodic heavy ransom levied upon Christian communities by Muslim rulers in order to fund military campaigns, all of which contributed a significant proportion of income to the Islamic states while conversely reducing many Christians to poverty, and these financial and social hardships forced many Christians to convert to Islam. Christians unable to pay these taxes were forced to surrender their children to the Muslim rulers as payment who would sell them as slaves to Muslim households where they were forced to convert to Islam.

==== Cultural impact and interaction ====
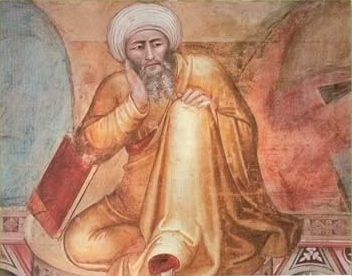
Andalusian Muslim theologian and philosopher Averroes was influential on the rediscovery of Aristotelian philosophy in the Middle Ages and the rise of secular thought in Latin Western Europe.

Overthrown by the Abbasids, the deposed Umayyad caliph Abd al-Rahman I fled the city of Damascus in 756 and established an independent Emirate of Córdoba in al-Andalus. His dynasty consolidated the presence of Islam in al-Andalus. By the time of the reign of Abd al-Rahman II (822–852), Córdoba was becoming one of the biggest and most important cities in Europe. Umayyad Spain had become a centre of the Muslim world that rivaled the Muslim cities of Damascus and Baghdad. "The emirs of Córdoba built palaces reflecting the confidence and vitality of Andalusi Islam, minted coins, brought to Spain luxury items from the East, initiated ambitious projects of irrigation and transformed agriculture, reproduced the style and ceremony of the Abbasid court ruling in the East and welcomed famous scholars, poets and musicians from the rest of the Muslim world". But, the most significant impact of the Emirate was its cultural influence over the Non-Muslim local populations. An "elegant Arabic" became the preferred language of the educated—Muslim, Christian, and Jewish, the readership of Arabic books increased rapidly, and Arabic romance and poetry became extremely popular. The popularity of literary Arabic was just one aspect of the Arabization of the Christian and Jewish populations of the Iberian Peninsula, which led contemporaries to refer to the affected populations as "Mozarabs" (mozárabes in Spanish; moçárabes in Portuguese; derived from the Arabic musta’rib, translated as "like Arabs" or "Arabicized")."

Arabic-speaking Iberian Christian scholars preserved and studied influential pre-Christian and pre-Islamic Greco-Roman texts, and introduced aspects of medieval Islamic culture, including the arts, economics, science, and technology. (See also: Latin translations of the 12th century and Islamic contributions to Medieval Europe). Muslim rule endured in the Emirate of Granada, from 1238 as a vassal state of the Christian Kingdom of Castile until the completion of La Reconquista in 1492. The Moriscos (Moorish in Spanish) were finally expelled from Spain between 1609 (Castile) and 1614 (rest of Iberia), by Philip III during the Spanish Inquisition.

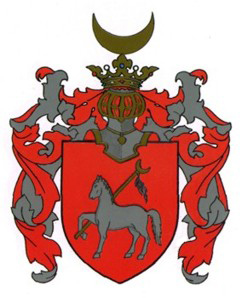
"Araz" coat of arms of Polish Tatar nobility. Tatar coats of arms often included motifs related to Islamic culture.

European kingdoms began establishing embassies and diplomatic missions to the Ottoman Empire between the 15th and 16th centuries in order to create closer, and more friendly, relationships with the Ottoman Turks (see also: Franco-Ottoman alliance). The fear of Ottoman expansion and its implications on religion in Europe finally dissipated by the 17th century. By this time in history, the Ottoman Empire was perceived by Western Europeans as a perplexing and exotic land that they referred to as "the Orient"; Orientalism, as it pertains to the Ottomans, was a method employed by Westerners to attempt to understand life in the Ottoman Empire. The last hundred years of the Ottoman Empire brought about the period in which the rest of European countries looked upon it as the "Sick man of Europe", as it was widely held that the Ottoman Empire was a stagnant nation and incapable of modernizing. This thesis was used throughout most of the 20th century as the basis of both Western and Republican Turkish understanding of Ottoman history. However, by 1978, historians had begun to reexamine the fundamental assumptions of the Ottoman decline thesis.

Throughout the 16th to 19th centuries, the Barbary States sent pirates to raid nearby parts of Europe in order to capture Christian slaves to sell at slave markets in the Muslim world, primarily in North Africa and the Ottoman Empire, throughout the Renaissance and early modern period. According to historian Robert Davis, from the 16th to 19th centuries, Barbary pirates captured 1 million to 1.25 million Europeans as slaves, although these numbers are disputed. These slaves were captured mainly from the crews of captured vessels, from coastal villages in Spain and Portugal, and from farther places like the Italian Peninsula, France, or England, the Netherlands, Ireland, the Azores Islands, and even Iceland. For a long time, until the early 18th century, the Crimean Khanate maintained a massive slave trade with the Ottoman Empire and the Middle East. The Crimean Tatars frequently mounted raids into the Danubian Principalities, Poland–Lithuania, and Russia to enslave people whom they could capture.

=== Central and Eastern Europe ===
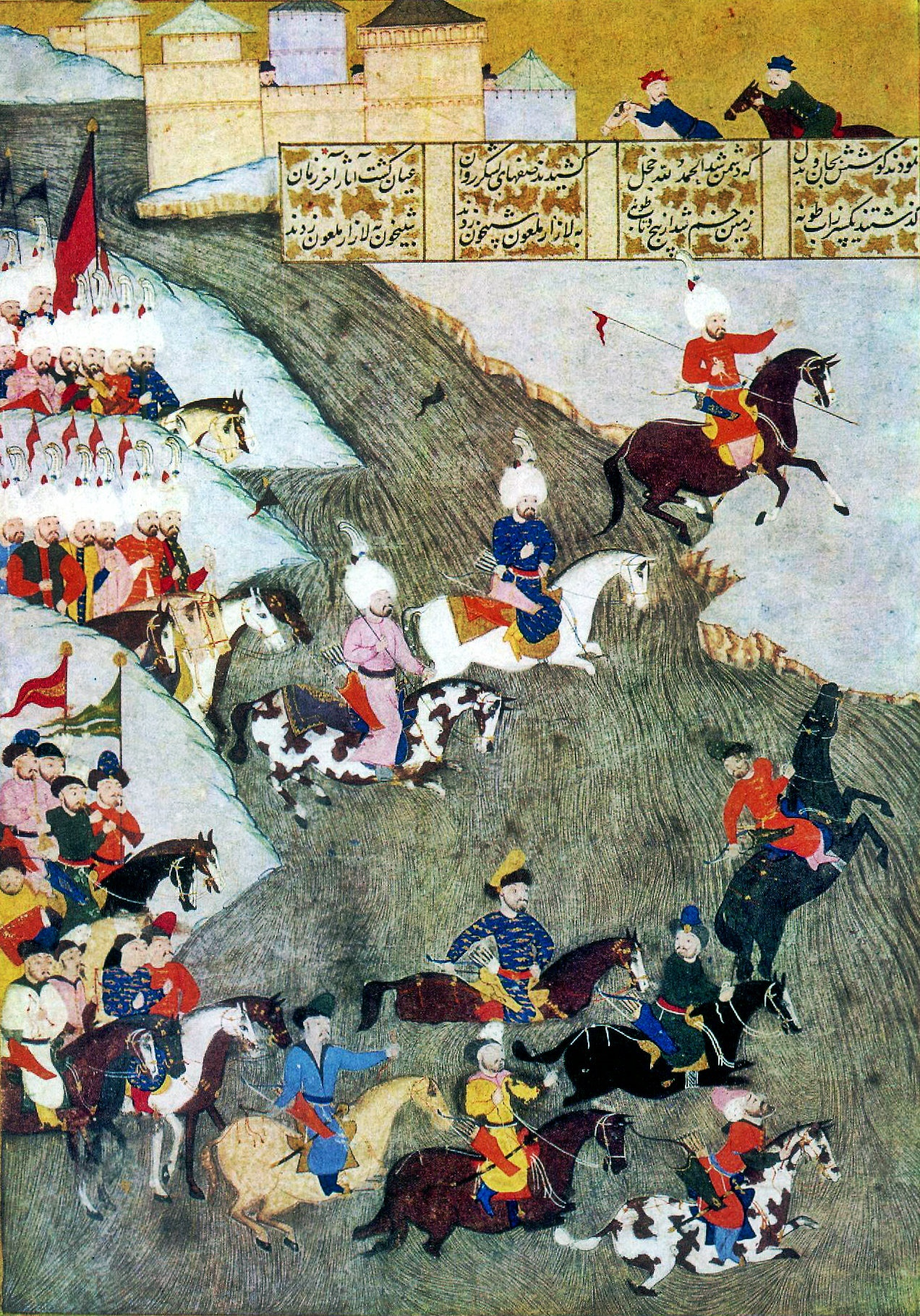
The Ottoman campaign for territorial expansion in Europe in 1566; Crimean Tatars were used as vanguard troops by the Ottoman army.

==== Belarus, Lithuania, and Poland ====
The Lipka Tatars in present-day Belarus, Lithuania, and Poland are a Turkic ethnic group who originally settled in the Grand Duchy of Lithuania at the beginning of the 14th century. Traditionally, the material of their mosques is wood. Lithuanian Tatars, who are descendants of immigrants from the Crimean Khanate, are considered an ethnic group of Crimean Tatars.

The first Tatar settlers tried to preserve their Turco-Mongol shamanistic religion and sought asylum amongst the pre-Christian Lithuanians. Towards the end of the 14th century, another wave of Tatars—this time, Islamized Turks, were invited into the Grand Duchy by Vytautas the Great. These Tatars first settled in Lithuania proper around Vilnius, Trakai, Hrodna, and Kaunas.

The Lipka Tatar origins can be traced back to the descendant states of the Golden Horde, the Crimean Khanate, and Kazan Khanate. They initially served as a noble military caste but later they became urban-dwellers known for their crafts, horses, and gardening skills. Throughout centuries, they resisted assimilation and kept their traditional lifestyle. While they remained very attached to their religion, over time they lost their original Tatar language, from the Kipchak group of the Turkic languages and for the most part adopted Belarusian, Lithuanian, and Polish. There are still small groups of Lipka Tatars living in Belarus, Lithuania, and Poland, as well as their communities in the United States.

==== Finland ====
The Finnish Tatars are a Tatar ethnic group and minority in Finland whose community has approximately 600–700 members. The community was formed between the late 1800s and the early 1900s, when Mishar Tatar merchants emigrated from the Nizhny Novgorod Governorate of the Russian Empire, and eventually settled in Finland. Tatars have the main building of their congregation in Helsinki. They have also founded cultural associations in different cities. They are the oldest Muslim community in Finland.

The identity of the Finnish Tatars has had different reference points throughout their history in the country. In the early days, they were known by their religious identity (Muslims). Starting from the establishment of the Republic of Turkey, local Turkic Tatars began associating themselves as "Turks". (Note: The Finnish word "turkkilainen" can mean either "Turkish" or "Turkic", but as an individual word usually refers to a Turkish person.) During those times they were also influenced by Turkish culture and for example adopted the Latin alphabet, which replaced the previously used Arabic one. Nowadays, they once again identify as Tatars and are very connected to Tatarstan and especially its capital, Kazan.

==== Russia and Ukraine ====
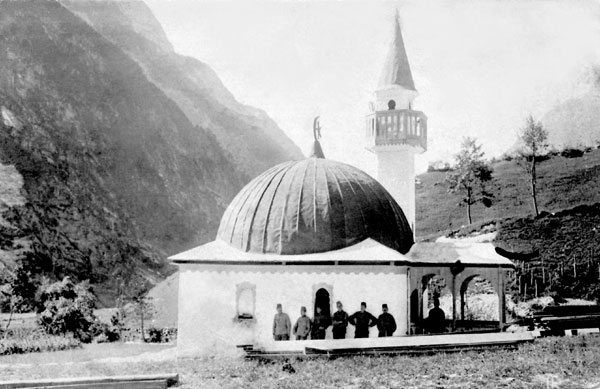
Log pod Mangartom Mosque, the only mosque ever built in Slovenia, constructed in the town of Log pod Mangartom during World War I.

In the mid-7th century AD, following the Muslim conquest of Persia, Islam spread into areas that are today part of Russia as a result of the Russo-Persian Wars. There are accounts of the trade connections between Muslims and the Rus', apparently people from the Baltic region who made their way towards the Black Sea through Central Russia.

The Mongols began their invasion of Rus', of Volga Bulgaria, and of the Cuman-Kipchak Confederation (parts of present-day Russia and Ukraine) in the 13th century. After the Mongol Empire fractured into four separate khanates, the eastern European section became known as the Golden Horde. Although not originally Muslim, the western Mongols adopted Islam as their religion in the early-14th century under Berke Khan, and later Uzbeg Khan established it as the official religion of the state. Much of the mostly Turkic-speaking population of the Horde, as well as the small Mongol aristocracy, became Islamized as well (if they were not already Muslim, like the Volga Bulgars), and were known to Russians and other Europeans as the "Tatars".

=== Cultural influences ===
Islam piqued interest among European scholars, setting off the movement of Orientalism. The founder of modern Islamic studies in Europe was Ignác Goldziher, who began studying Islam in the late 19th century. For instance, Richard Francis Burton, 19th-century English explorer, scholar, and orientalist, and translator of The Book of One Thousand and One Nights, disguised himself as a Pashtun and visited both Medina and Mecca during the Hajj, as described in his book A Personal Narrative of a Pilgrimage to Al-Medinah and Meccah.

Islamic architecture influenced European architecture in various ways (for example, the Türkischer Tempel synagogue in Vienna). During the 12th-century Renaissance in Europe, Latin translations of Arabic texts were introduced.

== Current demographics ==
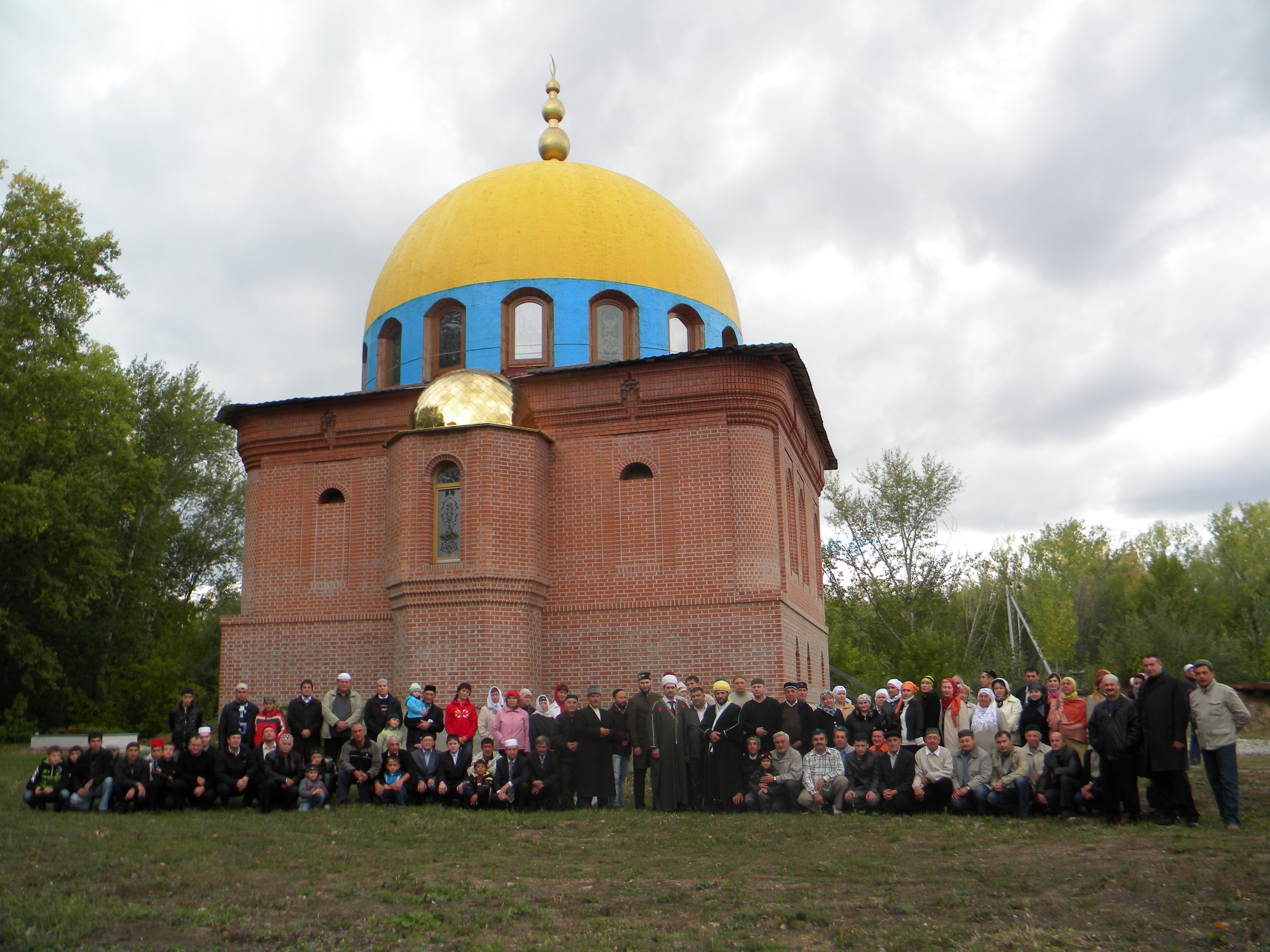
Mosque of Twenty-Five Prophets in Ufa, Bashkortostan, Russia

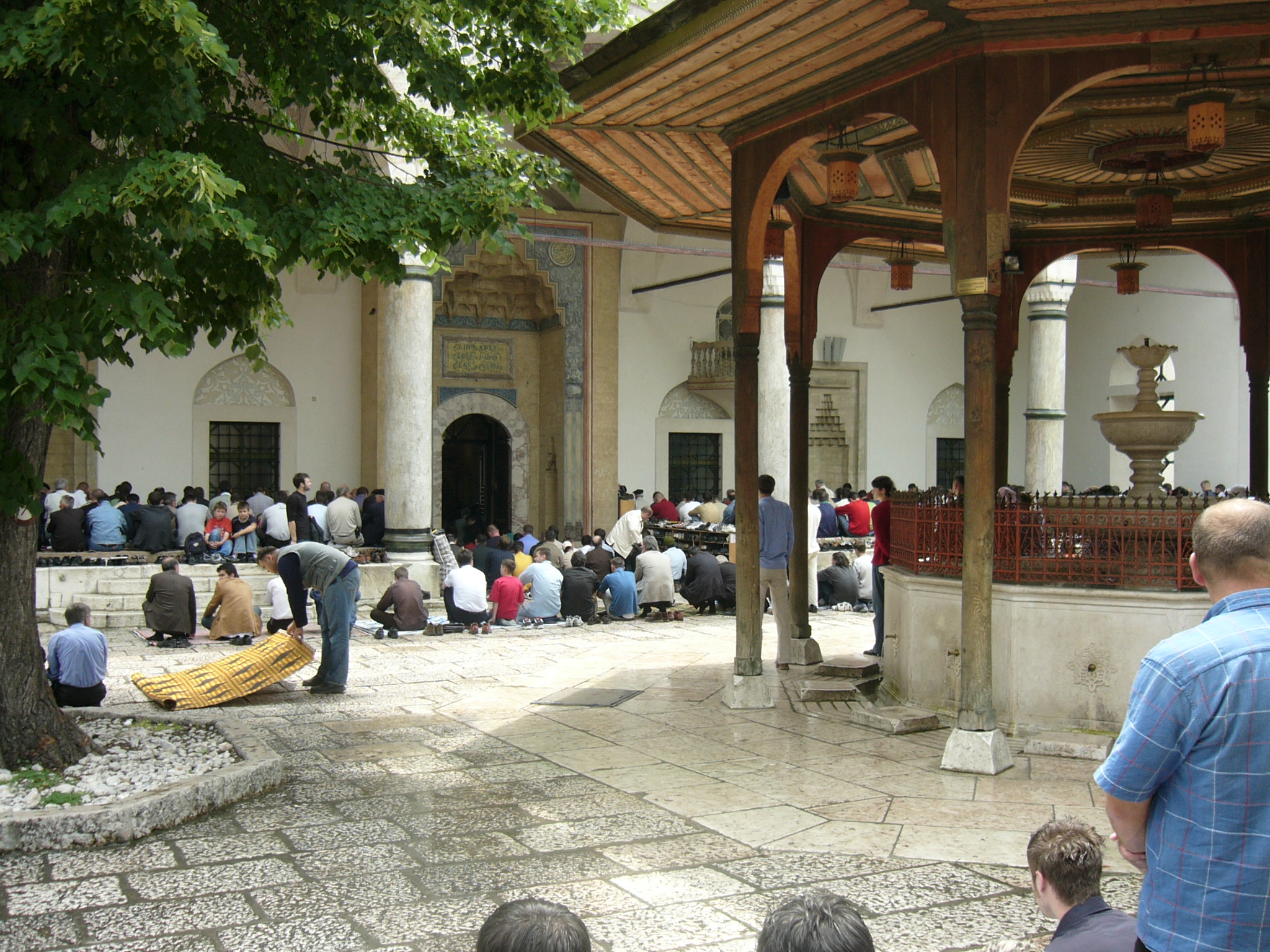
Gazi Husrev-beg Mosque in Sarajevo, Bosnia and Herzegovina

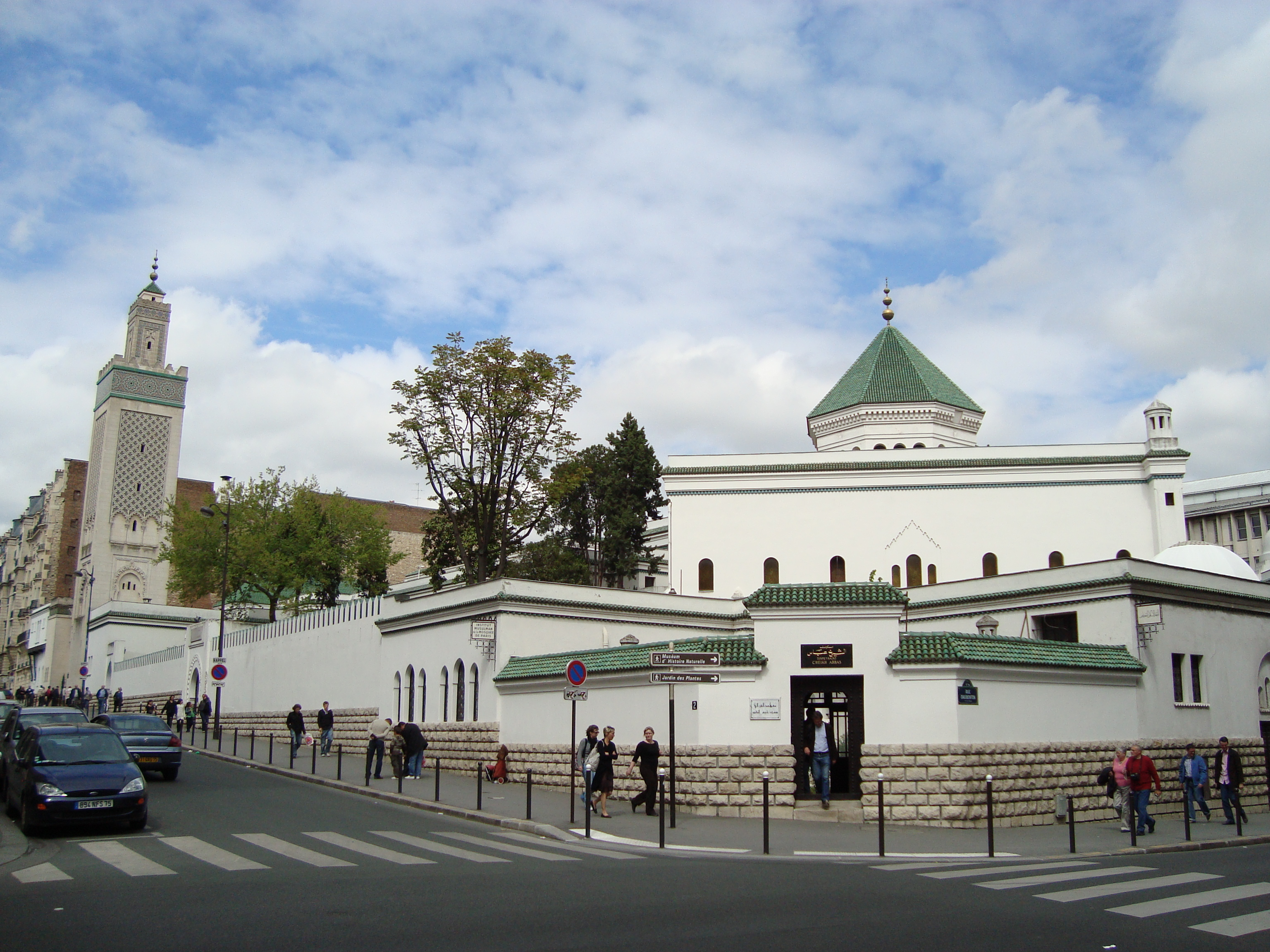
The Great Mosque of Paris, built after World War I.

The exact number of Muslims in Europe is unknown but according to estimates by the Pew Forum, the total number of Muslims in Europe (excluding Turkey) in 2010 was about 44 million (6% of the total population), including 19 million (3.8% of the population) in the European Union. A 2010 Pew Research Center study reported that 2.7% of the world's Muslim population live in Europe. According to Pew estimates, as of 2020, Muslims comprised about 6% of Europe’s population, totaling approximately 45.6 million people.

Turkish people form the largest ethnic group in the European part of Turkey and Northern Cyprus. They also form centuries-old minority groups in other post-Ottoman nation states within the Balkans (i.e. the Balkan Turks), where they form the largest ethnic minority in Bulgaria and the second-largest minority in North Macedonia. Meanwhile, in the diaspora, the Turks form the largest ethnic minority group in Austria, Denmark, Germany, and the Netherlands. In 1997, there was approximately 10 million Turks living in Western Europe and the Balkans (i.e. excluding Northern Cyprus and Turkey). By 2010, up to 15 million Turks were living in the European Union (i.e. excluding Turkey and several Balkan and Eastern European countries which are not in the EU). According to sociologist Araks Pashayan 10 million "Euro-Turks" alone were living in Germany, France, the Netherlands, and Belgium in 2012. In addition, substantial Turkish communities have been formed in the United Kingdom, Austria, Sweden, Switzerland, Denmark, Italy, Liechtenstein, Finland, and Spain. Meanwhile, there are over one million Turks still living in the Balkans (especially in Bulgaria, Greece, Kosovo, North Macedonia, and Dobruja), and approximately 400,000 Meskhetian Turks in the Eastern European regions of the Post-Soviet states (i.e. Azerbaijan, Georgia, Kazakhstan, Russia, and Ukraine).

Estimates of the percentage of Muslims in Russia (the biggest group of Muslims in Europe) vary from 5 to 11.7%, depending on sources. It also depends on if only observant Muslims or all people of Muslim descent are counted. The city of Moscow is home to an estimated 1.5 million Muslims.

50.7% of the population in Albania adheres to Islam, making it the largest religion in the country. The majority of Albanian Muslims are secular Sunnīs with a significant Bektashi Shīʿa minority. The percentage of Muslims is 93.5% in Kosovo, 39.3% in North Macedonia (according to the 2002 Census, 46.5% of the children aged 0–4 were Muslim in Macedonia) and 50.7% in Bosnia and Herzegovina. In transcontinental countries such as Turkey and Azerbaijan, 99% and 93% of the populations from the respective countries are initially registered by the state as Muslims. According to the 2011 census, 20% of the total population in Montenegro are Muslims.

"Non-denominational Muslims" is an umbrella term that has been used for and by Muslims who do not belong to a specific Islamic denomination, do not self-identify with any specific Islamic denomination, or cannot be readily classified under one of the identifiable Islamic schools and branches. A quarter of the world's Muslim population are non-denominational Muslims. Non-denominational Muslims constitute the majority of the Muslim population in eight countries, and a plurality in three others: Albania (65%), Kyrgyzstan (64%), Kosovo (58%), Indonesia (56%), Mali (55%), Bosnia and Herzegovina (54%), Uzbekistan (54%), Azerbaijan (45%), Russia (45%), and Nigeria (42%). They are found primarily in Central Asia. Kazakhstan has the largest number of non-denominational Muslims, who constitute about 74% of the population. Southeastern Europe also has a large number of non-denominational Muslims.

In 2015, Darren E. Sherkat questioned in Foreign Affairs whether some of the Muslim growth projections are accurate as they don't take into account the increasing number of non-religious Muslims. Quantitative research is lacking, but he believes the European trend mirrors that from North America: statistical data from the General Social Survey in the United States show that 32% of those raised Muslim no longer embrace Islam in adulthood, and 18% hold no religious identification (see also: Ex-Muslims).

A survey conducted by Pew Research Center in 2016 found that Muslims make up 4.9% of all Europe's population. According to the same study, conversion does not add significantly to the growth of the Muslim population in Europe, with roughly 160,000 more people leaving Islam than converting into Islam between 2010 and 2016.

Country	Estimated % of Muslims among total population in 2026
Cyprus	25.4
Bulgaria	10.8
France	10.0
Austria	8.3
Sweden	8.1
Belgium	7.6
Germany	6.6
Greece	6.3
Netherlands	6.0
United Kingdom	6.0
Switzerland	6.0
Norway	5.7
Spain	5.0
Denmark	4.3
Slovenia	3.0
Italy	2.9
Luxembourg	2.7
Finland	2.7
Croatia	1.6
Ireland	1.4

=== Projections ===
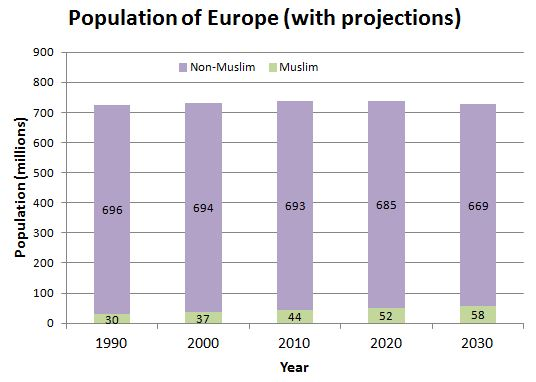
According to the Pew Research Center, Europe's population was 6% Muslim in 2010, and is projected to be 8% Muslim by 2030. (The data does not take into account population movements from the Middle East and Africa since the migration crisis.)

By 2010, an estimated 44 million Muslims were living in Europe (6%), with around 19 million in the European Union (3.8%). They are projected to increase to 58 million (8%) by 2030, in part due to a modest rise from conversions to Islam. A Pew Research Center study, published in January 2011, forecast an increase of Muslims in European population from 6% in 2010 to 8% in 2030. The study also predicted that Muslim fertility rate in Europe would drop from 2.2 in 2010 to 2.0 in 2030. On the other hand, the non-Muslim fertility rate in Europe would increase from 1.5 in 2010 to 1.6 in 2030. Another Pew study published in 2017 projected that in 2050 Muslims will make 7.4% (if all migration into Europe were to immediately and permanently stop - a "zero migration" scenario) up to 14% (under a "high" migration scenario) of Europe's population. Data from the 2000s for the rates of growth of Islam in Europe showed that the growing number of Muslims was due primarily to immigration and higher birth rates.

In 2017, the Pew Research Center projected that the Muslim population of Europe would reach a level between 7% and 14% by 2050. The projections depend on the level of migration. With no net migration, the projected level was 7%; with high migration, it was 14%. The projections varied greatly by country. Under the high migration scenario, the highest projected level of any historically non-Muslim country was 30% in Sweden. By contrast, Poland was projected to remain below 1%.

In 2006, the conservative Christian historian Philip Jenkins, in an article for the Foreign Policy Research Institute thinktank, wrote that by 2100, a Muslim population of about 25% of Europe's population was "probable"; Jenkins stated this figure did not take account of growing birthrates amongst Europe's immigrant Christians, but did not give details of his methodology. In 2010, Eric Kaufmann, professor of politics at Birkbeck, University of London said that "In our projections for Western Europe by 2050 we are looking at a range of 10-15 per cent Muslim population for most of the high immigration countries – Germany, France, the UK"; he argued that Islam was expanding, not because of conversion to Islam, but primarily due to the religion's "pro-natal" orientation, where Muslims tend to have more children. Other analysts are skeptical about the accuracy of the claimed Muslim population growth, stating that because many European countries do not ask a person's religion on official forms or in censuses, it has been difficult to obtain accurate estimates, and arguing that there has been a decrease in Muslim fertility rates in Morocco, the Netherlands, and Turkey.

=== Religiosity ===
According to an article published on the German public broadcaster Deutsche Welle, communities of Muslim immigrants remain strongly religious in some Western-European countries, in a trend which continues across generations. In the United Kingdom, 64% identify as "highly religious", followed by 42% in Austria, 33% in France, and 26% in Switzerland.

A 2005 survey published by the Université Libre de Bruxelles estimated that only 10% of the Muslim population in Belgium are "practicing Muslims". In 2009, only 24% of Muslims in the Netherlands attended mosque once a week according to another survey.

According to the same 2004 survey, they found that the importance of Islam in the lives of Dutch Muslims, particularly of second-generation immigrants was decreasing. According to a survey, only 33% of French Muslims who were interviewed said they were religious believers. That figure is the same as that obtained by the INED/INSEE survey in October 2010.

== Demographics by country ==
Country	Muslims (official)	Muslims (estimation)	% of total population	% of World Muslim population	Community origin (predominant)
Albania	1,217,362 (2023)	2,601,000 (Pew 2011)	50.67 (2023)	0.1	Indigenous (Albanians)
Andorra	N/A	< 1,000 (Pew 2011)	< 0.1	< 0.1	Immigrant
Armenia	N/A	1,038	< 0.1	< 0.1	Indigenous (Azerbaijanis)
Austria	N/A	745,600	8.3	< 0.1	Immigrant
Azerbaijan	N/A	10,073,758	97.3	0.5	Indigenous (Azerbaijanis)
Belarus	N/A	19,000 (Pew 2011)	0.2	< 0.1	Indigenous (Lipka Tatars) and Immigrant
Belgium	N/A	781,887 (2015 est.)	5.9–7	< 0.1	Immigrant
Bosnia and Herzegovina	1,790,454 (2013)	1,564,000 (Pew 2011)	50.7; 41.6 (Pew 2011)	0.1	Indigenous (Bosniaks, Romani, Croats)
Bulgaria	638,708 (2021)	1,002,000 (Pew 2011)	9.8 (2021)	< 0.1	Indigenous (Pomaks)
Croatia	50,981 (2021)	56,000 (Pew 2011)	1.32	< 0.1	Indigenous (Bosniaks, Croats) and Immigrant
Cyprus	N/A	200,000 (Pew 2011)	22.7 (Pew 2011)	< 0.1	Indigenous (Turks)
Czech Republic	N/A	4,000 (Pew 2011)	< 0.1	< 0.1	Immigrant
Denmark	N/A	226,000 (Pew 2011)	4.1 (Pew 2011)	< 0.1	Immigrant
Estonia	1,508	2,000	0.1 (Pew 2011)	< 0.1	Immigrant
Faroe Islands	N/A	< 1,000 (Pew 2011)	< 0.1	< 0.1	Immigrant
Finland	N/A	120,000-130.000	2.3	<0.1	Indigenous (Finnish Tatars) and Immigrant
France	N/A	6,700,000	10	0.3	Immigrant
(Georgia (country)) Georgia	N/A	398,677	11	< 0.1	Indigenous (Georgian Muslims, Azerbaijanis)
Germany	N/A	6,600,000-7,000,000 (2025)	8.0-8.5 (2025)	0.2	Immigrant
Greece	N/A	527,000 (Pew 2011)	4.7 (Pew 2011)	<0.1	Indigenous (Muslim minority of Greece) and Immigrant
Hungary	5,579	25,000 (Pew 2011)	0.3 (Pew 2011)	<0.1	Immigrant
Iceland	770	< 1,000 (Pew 2011)	0.2	<0.1	Immigrant
(Republic of Ireland) Ireland	81,930 (2022)	43,000 (Pew 2011)	1.6	<0.1	Immigrant
Italy	N/A	1,583,000 (Pew 2011)	2.3; 2.6 (Pew 2011)	0.1	Immigrant
Kosovo	1,482,276 (2024)	1,584,000 (CIA); 2,104,000 (Pew 2011)	93.49 (2024)	0.1	Indigenous (Albanians, Bosniaks, Gorani)
Latvia	N/A	2,000 (Pew 2011)	0.1	<0.1	Immigrant
Liechtenstein	N/A	2,000 (Pew 2011)	4.8 (Pew 2011)	<0.1	Immigrant
Lithuania	N/A	3,000 (Pew 2011)	0.1 (Pew 2011)	<0.1	Indigenous (Lipka Tatars)
Luxembourg	N/A	40,000 (2025)	6.0	<0.1	Immigrant
Malta	17,454 (2021)	6,000 (2010)	3.9	<0.1	Immigrant
Moldova	N/A	15,000 (Pew 2011)	0.4 (Pew 2011)	< 0.1	Immigrant
Monaco	N/A	< 1,000 (Pew 2011)	0.5 (Pew 2011)	< 0.1	Immigrant
Montenegro	124,668 (2023)	116,000 (Pew 2011)	19.99 (2023)	< 0.1	Indigenous (Bosniaks, Albanians, "Muslims")
Netherlands	N/A	914,000 (Pew 2011)	5 – 6	0.1	Immigrant
North Macedonia	590,878 (2021)	713,000 (Pew 2011)	32	<0.1	Indigenous (Albanians, Romani, Torbeši, Bosniaks)
Norway	N/A	182,607 (2020)	3.4 (2020)	< 0.1	Immigrant
Poland	2,209	20,000 (Pew 2011)	0.01 (official); 0.1 (Pew 2011)	< 0.1	Indigenous (Lipka Tatars) and Immigrant
Portugal	36,480	65,000 (Pew 2011)	0.42 (official); 0.6 (Pew 2011)	< 0.1	Immigrant
Romania	76,215	73,000 (Pew 2011)	0.4 (2022)	< 0.1	Indigenous (Tatars)
Russia	N/A	16,379,000 (Pew 2011)	11.7 (Pew 2011); 10−15 (CIA)	1.0	Indigenous and Immigrant
San Marino	N/A	< 1,000 (Pew 2011)	< 0.1	< 0.1	Immigrant
Serbia	278,212 (2022)	280,000 (Pew 2011)	4.2 (2022)	< 0.1	Indigenous (Bosniaks, "Muslims", Romani, Albanians, Gorani, Serbs)
Slovakia	3,862 (2021)	4,000 (Pew 2011)	0.07 (2021)	< 0.1	Immigrant
Slovenia	73,568	49,000 (Pew 2011)	2.4 (Pew 2011)	< 0.1	Immigrant and Indigenous
Spain	1,887,906	2,542,906 (Hispanomuslim)	5.0	0.1	Immigrant
Sweden	N/A	1,000,000 (2026)	10 (2026)	< 0.1	Immigrant
Switzerland	N/A	433,000	5.7 (Pew 2011)	< 0.1	Immigrant
Turkey	N/A	78,000,000	95	4.6	Indigenous (Turks)
Ukraine	N/A	393,000 (Pew 2011)	0.9 (Pew 2011)	< 0.1	Indigenous (Crimean Tatars)
United Kingdom	3,998,875 (2021)	2,869,000 (Pew 2011)	6.0 (2021)	0.2	Immigrant
Vatican City	0	0 (Pew 2011)	0 (Pew 2011)	0	None

== Society ==
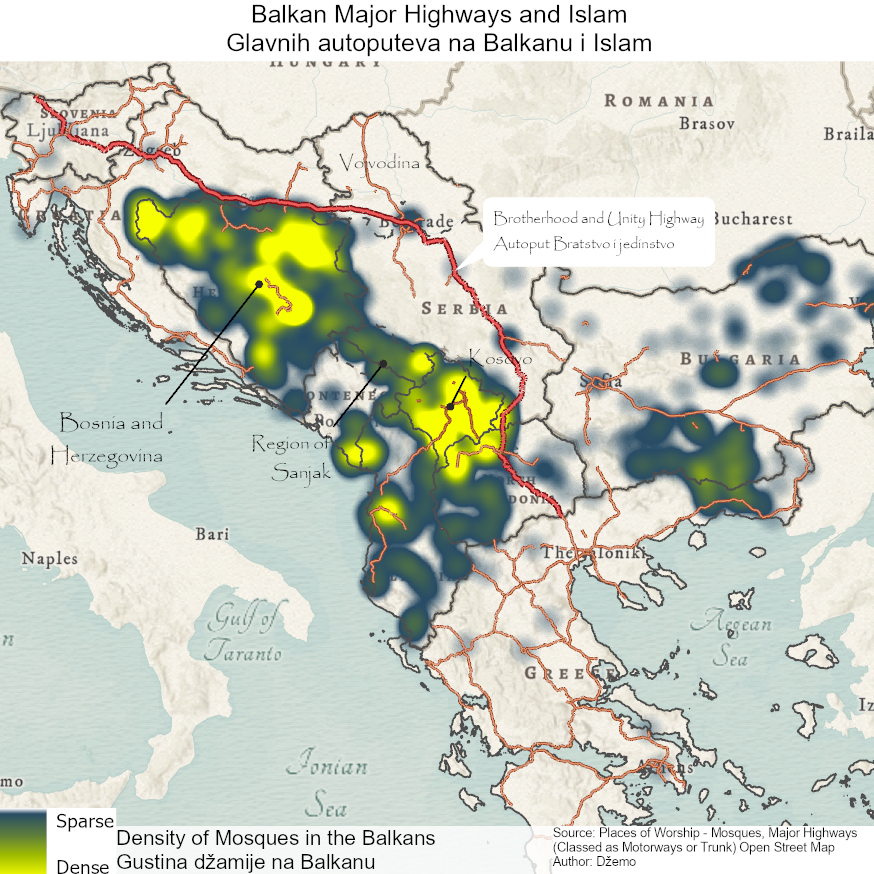
Islam in the Balkans, density of mosques

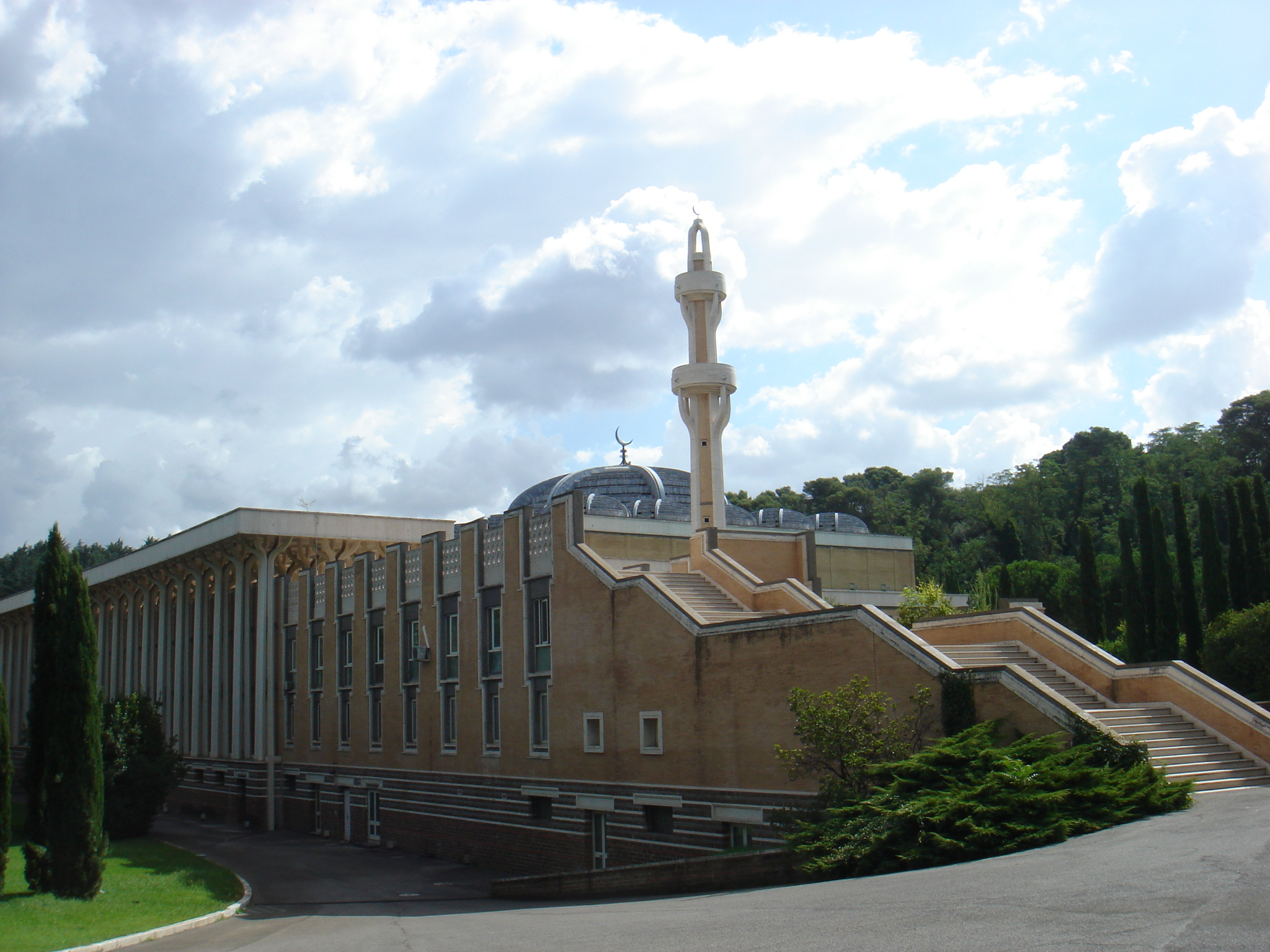
Mosque of Rome, the largest in the European Union

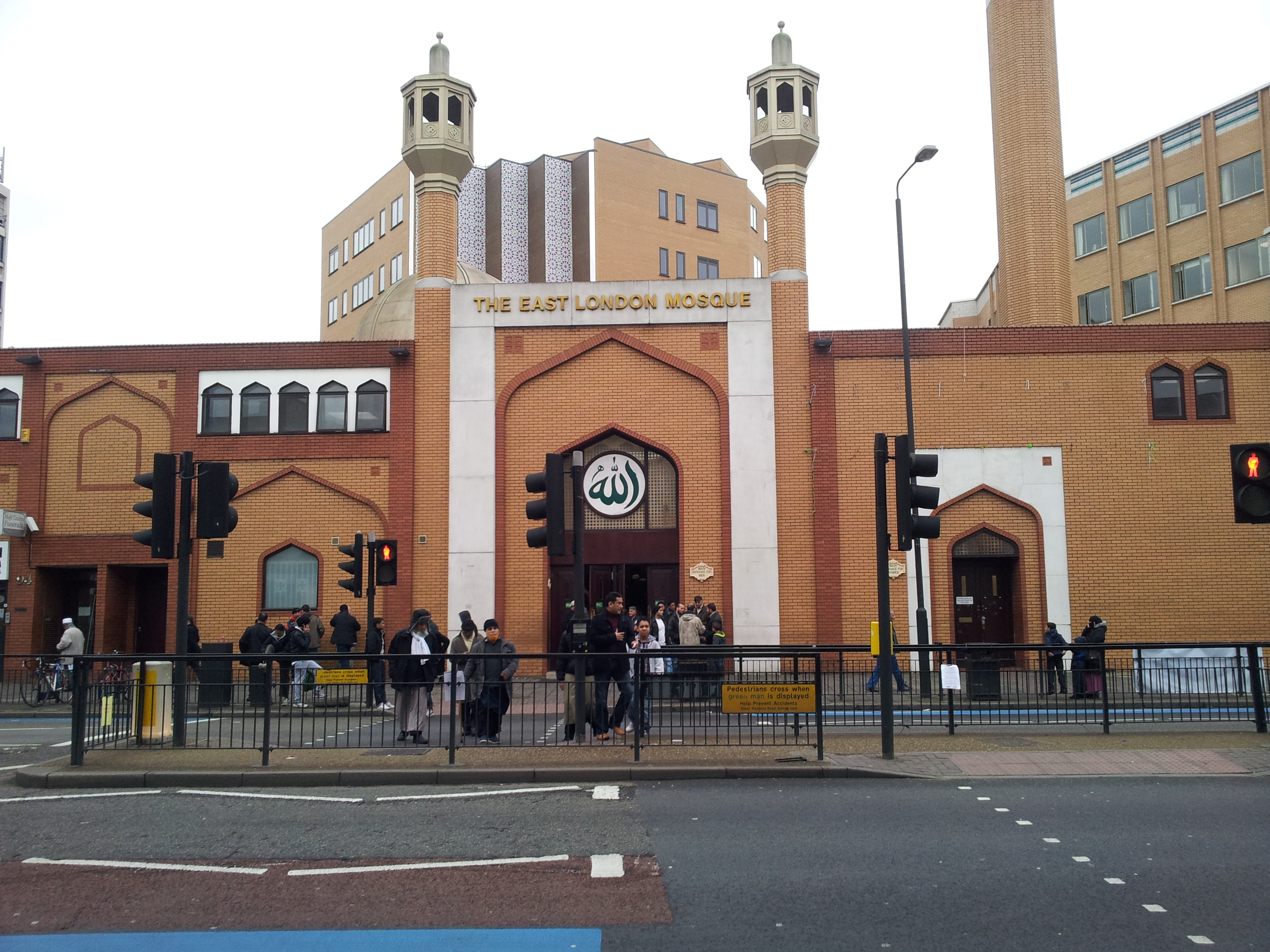
The East London Mosque was one of the first in Britain to be allowed to use loudspeakers to broadcast the adhan.

In the late 20th and early 21st centuries, large numbers of Muslims immigrated to Western Europe. By 2010, an estimated 44 million Muslims were living in Europe (6%), including an estimated 19 million in the EU (3.8%). They are projected to comprise 8% or 58 million by 2030. Islam in Europe is often the subject of intense discussion and political controversies sparked by events such as Islamist terrorist attacks in European countries, The Satanic Verses controversy, the cartoons affair in Denmark, debates over Islamic dress, and growing support for right-wing movements and parties that view Muslims as a threat to European culture and liberal values. Such events have also fueled ongoing debates regarding the topics of globalization, multiculturalism, nativism, Islamophobia, relations between Muslims and other religious groups, and populist politics.

=== Islamic organizations ===
In Europe, a variety of Islamic organizations serve to represent the diverse interests of Muslim communities and promote Islamic teachings, encourage Interfaith harmony and cultural contributions.

The Federation of Islamic Organizations in Europe (FIOE) an umbrella organization that represents more than 30 Muslim organizations in Europe. Its mission is to represent the interests of Muslims, and to foster dialogue and cooperation between Muslims and non-Muslims in Europe. FIOE subsequently created the European Council for Fatwa and Research, a pan European Muslim Brotherhood organisation which provides guidance to Muslims in Europe. The Muslim Council for Cooperation in Europe (MCCE) is a representative body of European citizens of Muslim faith before the EU administration for advice, representation and intra-European collaboration. In 1997, the MCCE has joined the initiative "A Soul for Europe" in the framework of "Dialogue with religions, churches and humanism" as part of the Group of Policy Advisors in the European Commission.

=== Islamic dress ===
In the context of Islamic dress in Europe, there are diverse perspectives regarding the wearing of face-covering veils and other traditional clothing among Muslim communities. Various European countries have implemented laws and regulations that pertain to religious clothing, including face-covering veils such as the burka or the hijab. These laws have generated considerable debate and criticism within and outside Muslim communities. Those who argue for the restrictions say they are in favor of security, or secularism. However, critics of such laws express concerns about infringements on individual freedom and religious expression, arguing that these restrictions have unintended consequences, including isolating and stigmatizing Muslim communities. Additionally, it has been noted by some observers that these dress bans have raised concerns about fueling Islamophobia across Europe.

According to a 2018 Pew Research Center study, the prevailing perspective in Western Europe supports restrictions on Muslim women wearing religious clothing that covers their faces, with a smaller proportion advocating for the prohibition of all forms of religious clothing. In the median country, around 25% hold the view that Muslim women should be allowed to wear the religious clothing of their choice.

The stance on clothing restrictions is not the same in every country. For example, about six-in-ten Portuguese adults who hold positive feelings toward Muslims support no restrictions on religious clothing. Overall, most people in Western Europe say they accept religious minorities – Muslims included. For example, a median of 66% of non-Muslim adults in the region say they would accept a Muslim as a member of their family, according to a separate question in a survey.

=== Islamic fundamentalism and terrorism ===
A 2013 study conducted by Wissenschaftszentrum Berlin für Sozialforschung (WZB) found that Islamic fundamentalism was widespread among Muslims in Europe. The study conducted a poll among Turkish immigrants to six European countries: Germany, France, the Netherlands, Belgium, Austria, and Sweden. In the first four countries also Moroccan immigrants were interviewed. Fundamentalism was defined as: the belief that believers should return to the eternal and unchangeable rules laid down in the past; that these rules allow only one interpretation and are binding for all believers; and that religious rules have priority over secular laws. Two thirds of Muslims the majority responded that religious rules are more important than civil laws and three quarters rejecting religious pluralism within Islam. Of the respondents, 44% agreed to all three statements. Almost 60% responded that Muslims should return to the roots of Islam, 75% thought there was only one possible interpretation of the Quran.

The conclusion was that religious fundamentalism is much more prevalent among European Muslims than among Christian natives. Perceived discrimination is a marginal predictor of religious fundamentalism. The perception that Western governments are inherently hostile towards Islam as a source of identity is prevailing among some European Muslims. However, a recent study shows that this perception significantly declined after the emergence of ISIS, particularly among the youth, and highly educated European Muslims. The difference between countries defies a "reactive religious fundamentalism", where fundamentalism is viewed as a reaction against lacking rights and privileges for Muslims. Instead, it was found that Belgium which has comparatively generous policies towards Muslims and immigrants in general also had a relatively high level of fundamentalism. France and Germany which have restrictive policies had lower levels of fundamentalism.

In 2017, the EU Counter-terrorism Coordinator Gilles de Kerchove stated in an interview that there were more than 50000 radicals and jihadists in Europe. In 2016, French authorities stated that 15000 of the 20000 individuals on the list of security threats belong to Islamist movements. In the United Kingdom, authorities estimate that 23000 jihadists reside in the country, of which about 3000 are actively monitored. In 2017, German authorities estimated that there were more than 10000 militant salafists in the country. European Muslims have also been criticized for new antisemitism.

=== Attitudes towards Muslims ===
The extent of negative attitudes towards Muslims varies across different parts of Europe.

Unfavorable views of Muslims, 2019
Country	Percent
Slovakia	77%
Poland	66%
Czech Republic	64%
Hungary	58%
Greece	57%
Lithuania	56%
Italy	55%
Spain	42%
Sweden	28%
Netherlands	28%
Germany	24%
France	22%
Ukraine	21%
Russia	19%
United Kingdom	18%

The European Monitoring Centre on Racism and Xenophobia reports that the Muslim population tends to suffer Islamophobia all over Europe, although the perceptions and views of Muslims may vary.

In 2005 according to the Sociaal en Cultureel Planbureau annual report, half the Dutch population and half the Moroccan and Turkish minorities stated that the Western lifestyle cannot be reconciled with that of Muslims.

A 2015 poll by the Polish Centre for Public Opinion Research found that 44% of Poles have a negative attitude towards Muslims, with only 23% having a positive attitude towards them. Furthermore, a majority agreed with statements like "Muslims are intolerant of customs and values other than their own." (64% agreed, 12% disagreed), "Muslims living in Western European countries generally do not acquire customs and values that are characteristic for the majority of the population of that country." (63% agreed, 14% disagreed), "Islam encourages violence more than other religions." (51% agreed, 24% disagreed).

A February 2017 poll of 10,000 people in 10 European countries by Chatham House found on average a majority were opposed to further Muslim immigration, with opposition especially pronounced in Austria, Poland, Hungary, France and Belgium. Of the respondents, 55% were opposed, 20% offered no opinion and 25% were in favour of further immigration from Muslim-majority countries. The authors of the study add that these countries, except Poland, had in the preceding years suffered jihadist terror attacks or been at the centre of a refugee crisis. They also mention that in most of the polled countries the radical right has political influence.

According to a study in 2018 by Leipzig University, 56% of Germans sometimes thought the many Muslims made them feel like strangers in their own country, up from 43% in 2014. In 2018, 44% thought immigration by Muslims should be banned, up from 37% in 2014.

Based off U.S. State Department records in 2013, there were about 226 Anti-Muslim attacks in France, which was more than an 11% increase from the year previous. Examples of the attacks included a bomb in an Arab restaurant, and grenades thrown at mosques. In more recent years, the aftermath of terrorist attacks in France have led to huge amounts of anti-Islamic rhetoric and increasing amounts of hate crimes. The French government has also acted upon the Muslim population of France in recent years, with the lower house passing an anti-radicalism bill and increasing checks in places of worship.

As of October 2023, Slovakia is the only EU member state that does not have a mosque due to legislation that has barred Islam from gaining state recognition.

=== Employment ===
Research indicates that factors such as background, religiosity, and perceived discrimination among others, contribute to approximately 40% of the employment gap between Muslims and non-Muslims. Additionally, perceived group discrimination is closely linked to higher unemployment rates among second-generation Muslims. According to a WZB report, Muslims in Europe generally have higher levels of unemployment due to language barriers, weak social ties, and restrictive gender roles. Also discrimination from employers caused unemployment.

A recent study found that poor employment outcomes for Muslims in Britain are not due to sociocultural attitudes or religious practices but are linked to significant Islamophobic discrimination. The research, based on data from the UK Household Longitudinal Study, revealed that factors like religiosity and gender attitudes have minimal impact on the employment gap. Instead, perceived Muslimness and country of origin play a more significant role, highlighting the need to address multidimensional Islamophobia to reduce these disparities.

== See also ==
- A Common Word Between Us and You
- Antemurale Christianitatis
- Early Muslim conquests
- Eurabia conspiracy theory
- History of Islam
- Islam and other religions
- Islam by country
- Islamic culture
- Islamic dress in Europe
- Islamic extremism
- Islamic feminism
- Islamic fundamentalism
- Islamic terrorism
- Islamic terrorism in Europe
- Islamism
- Islamophobia
- List of mosques in Europe
- Ottoman wars in Europe
- Persecution of Muslims
- Turks in Europe
- Catholic–Muslim Forum
- European Council for Fatwa and Research
- Muslim Council for Cooperation in Europe

== Bibliography ==
- AlSayyad, Nezar; Castells, Manuel, eds. (2002). Muslim Europe Or Euro-Islam: Politics, Culture, and Citizenship in the Age of Globalization. Lanham, Maryland: Rowman & Littlefield, co-published with the Center for Middle Eastern Studies (University of California, Berkeley). ISBN 978-0-7391-0338-8. LCCN 2001050240.
- Allen, Chris; Amiraux, Valerie; Choudhury, Tufyal; Godard, Bernard; Karich, Imane; Rigoni, Isabelle; Roy, Olivier; Silvestri, Sara (November 2007). Amghar, Samir; Boubekeur, Amel; Emerson, Michael (eds.). European Islam: Challenges for Society and Public Policy (PDF). Brussels: Centre for European Policy Studies. ISBN 978-92-9079-710-4. S2CID 152484262. Archived (PDF) from the original on 18 April 2018.
- Archick, Kristin; Belkin, Paul; Blanchard, Christopher M.; Ek, Carl; Mix, Derek E. (7 September 2011). "Muslims in Europe: Promoting Integration and Countering Extremism" (PDF). Washington, D.C.: CRS Report for Congress. Archived (PDF) from the original on 25 November 2011.
- Bougarel, Xavier (2005). "Balkan Muslim Diasporas and the Idea of a "European Islam"". In Dulic, Tomislav (ed.). Balkan Currents. Essays in Honour of Kjell Magnusson. Uppsala Multiethnic Papers. Vol. 49. Uppsala: Uppsala University Press. pp. 147–165. S2CID 158986618 – via Halshs.archives-ouvertes.fr.
- Bougarel, Xavier (2012) [2007]. "Bosnian Islam as 'European Islam': Limits and Shifts of A Concept". In al-Azmeh, Aziz; Fokas, Effie (eds.). Islam in Europe: Diversity, Identity, and Influence (PDF). Cambridge: Cambridge University Press. pp. 96–124. doi:10.1017/CBO9780511809309.007. ISBN 9780511809309. S2CID 91182456.
- Bougarel, Xavier; Clayer, Nathalie (2013). Les musulmans de l'Europe du Sud-Est: Des Empires aux États balkaniques. Terres et gens d'islam. Paris: IISMM - Karthala. ISBN 978-2-8111-0905-9 – via Cairn.info.
- Cesari, Jocelyne, ed. (2014). The Oxford Handbook of European Islam. Oxford: Oxford University Press. doi:10.1093/oxfordhb/9780199607976.001.0001. ISBN 978-0-19-960797-6. LCCN 2014936672. S2CID 153038977.
- Cesari, Jocelyne (2012) [2007]. "Muslim Identities in Europe: The Snare of Exceptionalism". In al-Azmeh, Aziz; Fokas, Effie (eds.). Islam in Europe: Diversity, Identity, and Influence. Cambridge: Cambridge University Press. pp. 49–67. doi:10.1017/CBO9780511809309.005. ISBN 9780511809309. S2CID 153719589.
- Cesari, Jocelyne (January 2012). Brunner, Rainer (ed.). "Securitization of Islam in Europe". Die Welt des Islams. 52 (3/4). Leiden: Brill Publishers: 430–449. doi:10.1163/15700607-201200A8. ISSN 1570-0607. JSTOR 41722006. S2CID 143814967.
- Cesari, Jocelyne (January–June 2002). "Introduction - "L'Islam en Europe: L'Incorporation d'Une Religion"". Cahiers d'Études sur la Méditerranée Orientale et le monde Turco-Iranien (in French). 33. Paris: Éditions de Boccard: 7–20. doi:10.3406/CEMOT.2002.1623. S2CID 165345374 – via Persée.fr.
- Clayer, Nathalie (2004). "Les musulmans des Balkans Ou l'islam de "l'autre Europe"/The Balkans Muslims Or the Islam of the "Other Europe"". Religions, pouvoir et société: Europe centrale, Balkans, CEI. Le Courrier de Pays de l'Est (in French). 5 (1045). Paris: La Documentation française: 16–27. doi:10.3917/cpe.045.0016. ISSN 0590-0239 – via Cairn.info.
- El Ayoubi, Mostafa; Paravati, Claudio, eds. (2018). Dall'islam in Europa all'islam europeo: La sfida dell'integrazione. Biblioteca di testi e studi (in Italian). Vol. 1177. Rome: Carocci Editore. ISBN 9788843091072.
- Elbasani, Arolda; Roy, Olivier, eds. (2015). The Revival of Islam in the Balkans: From Identity to Religiosity. Islam and Nationalism. Basingstoke: Palgrave Macmillan. doi:10.1057/9781137517845. hdl:1814/36698. ISBN 978-1-137-51783-8. S2CID 164180984.
- Fine, John V. A. (1994). The Late Medieval Balkans: A Critical Survey from the Late Twelfth Century to the Ottoman Conquest. University of Michigan Press. ISBN 0-472-08260-4.
- Franke, Patrick, Islam: State and Religion in Modern Europe, EGO - European History Online, Mainz: Institute of European History, 2016, retrieved: March 8, 2021 (pdf).
- Grim, Brian J.; Karim, Mehtab S. (January 2011). "The Future of the Global Muslim Population: Projections for 2010-2030" (PDF). The Pew Forum on Religion & Public Life. Washington, D.C.: Pew Research Center. LCCN 2011505325. Archived (PDF) from the original on 14 October 2018.
- Hashas, Mohammed (2018). "Does European Islam Think?". In Thielmann, Jörn; Račius, Egdūnas; Vinding, Niels Valdemar (eds.). Exploring the Multitude of Muslims in Europe: Essays in Honour of Jørgen S. Nielsen. Muslim Minorities. Vol. 27. Leiden: Brill Publishers. pp. 35–49. doi:10.1163/9789004362529_004. ISBN 978-90-04-36249-9. ISSN 1570-7571. LCCN 2017058914.
- Hashas, Mohammed (2018). The Idea of European Islam: Religion, Ethics, Politics and Perpetual Modernity. London: Routledge. doi:10.4324/9781315106397. ISBN 9780367509743. S2CID 158337114.
- Hourani, Albert; Ruthven, Malise (2010) [1991]. A History of the Arab Peoples (Updated ed.). London: Faber & Faber. ISBN 978-0-674-39565-7.
- Karić, Enes (2002). "Is 'Euro-Islam' a Myth, Challenge, or a Real Opportunity for Muslims and Europe?". Journal of Muslim Minority Affairs. 22 (2). London: Taylor & Francis: 435–442. doi:10.1080/1360200022000027375. ISSN 1360-2004. S2CID 144393965.
- Martikainen, Tuomas; Mapril, José; Khan, Adil Hussain, eds. (2019). Muslims at the Margins of Europe: Finland, Greece, Ireland and Portugal. Muslim Minorities. Vol. 32. Leiden: Brill Publishers. ISBN 978-90-04-40455-7. ISSN 1570-7571. LCCN 2019023090.
- Merdjanova, Ina (30 April 2008). "Euro-Islam v. "Eurabia": Defining the Muslim Presence in Europe". www.wilsoncenter.org. Washington, D.C.: Woodrow Wilson International Center for Scholars.
- Nielsen, Jørgen S. (1999). Towards a European Islam. Migration, Minorities, and Citizenship. Basingstoke: Palgrave Macmillan. doi:10.1057/9780230379626. ISBN 978-0-333-72374-6.
- Nielsen, Jørgen S. (2012) [2007]. "The Question of Euro-Islam: Restriction or Opportunity?". In al-Azmeh, Aziz; Fokas, Effie (eds.). Islam in Europe: Diversity, Identity, and Influence. Cambridge: Cambridge University Press. pp. 34–48. doi:10.1017/CBO9780511809309.004. ISBN 9780511809309. S2CID 143052880.
- Račius, Egdūnas, ed. (2020). Islam in Post-communist Eastern Europe: Between Churchification and Securitization. Muslim Minorities. Vol. 35. Leiden: Brill Publishers. ISBN 978-90-04-42534-7. ISSN 1570-7571. LCCN 2020907634.
- Šuško, Dževada, ed. (2019). Both Muslim and European: Diasporic and Migrant Identities of Bosniaks. Muslim Minorities. Vol. 30. Leiden: Brill Publishers. ISBN 978-90-04-39402-5. ISSN 1570-7571. LCCN 2018061684.
- Tibi, Bassam (2010). "Euro-Islam: An Alternative to Islamization and Ethnicity of Fear". In Baran, Zeyno (ed.). The Other Muslims: Moderate and Secular. New York: Palgrave Macmillan. pp. 157–174. doi:10.1057/9780230106031_10. ISBN 978-0-230-62188-6. S2CID 148008368.
