= Islam in Vatican City =

Overview of Islam in Vatican City and the Holy See's relations with Muslims

Islam in Vatican City is demographically marginal. Vatican City is a small city-state ruled by the Pope, the head of the Catholic Church. Its population is about 800 residents, of whom a little over 450 hold Vatican citizenship, which is granted chiefly on the basis of office or service to the Holy See or to the state administration. There is no mosque in Vatican City, and Muslim presence on its territory consists of visiting scholars, diplomats and delegations rather than a resident community.

In October 2025 the vice-prefect of the Vatican Apostolic Library stated in an interview that the library had provided a room with a prayer carpet for Muslim scholars who work there, which drew wide media attention and criticism from some Catholic commentators. Beyond the territory itself, the Holy See has maintained an institutional dialogue with Muslims since the Second Vatican Council, and several popes have met Muslim religious leaders at the Vatican and abroad.

== Background ==
Vatican City is distinct from the Holy See, although the two are closely linked. Citizenship of the city-state is not acquired by birth and is tied to a person's function, so that most of its citizens are cardinals, diplomats of the Holy See, clergy, officials and guards, and citizenship lapses when the function ends. The religious life of the territory is therefore overwhelmingly Catholic, and Islam is encountered there mainly through the Holy See's diplomatic, scholarly and interreligious activity.

== Muslim presence in Vatican City ==
=== Visitors, scholars and diplomats ===
Muslim scholars visit Vatican City to consult the collections of the Vatican Apostolic Library, and delegations of Muslim religious leaders and diplomats are received at the Apostolic Palace. Ambassadors of a number of Muslim-majority states are accredited to the Holy See; one example is the Islamic Republic of Iran, whose new ambassador was received by Pope John Paul II in January 2001.

=== Prayer room in the Vatican Apostolic Library (2025) ===
In an interview with the Italian daily la Repubblica published in early October 2025, the vice-prefect of the library, Giacomo Cardinali, said that some Muslim scholars had asked for a room with a carpet in which to pray and that the library had provided one. Cardinali presented the library as a "universal" institution open to scholars of every faith. The interview, which dealt mainly with the digitisation of the library's holdings, also mentioned that the library holds very old copies of the Quran alongside Arabic, Hebrew, Ethiopic and Chinese collections.

Later reporting and clarifications described the space as a room with a carpet, available to Muslim researchers, and not as a permanent or publicly accessible place of worship or a "mosque" within the Vatican.

==== Reaction ====
The disclosure was widely reported in English-language media, some of which used sensational headlines, although a Catholic news agency's fact-check concluded that the headlines were not technically inaccurate. The Swiss bishop Marian Eleganti criticised the decision, arguing that it risked blurring Catholic identity and noting that Muslims already have large mosques in Rome. Other commentators described it as ordinary academic hospitality.

== The Holy See and Islam ==
=== Second Vatican Council ===
The Church's modern approach to Islam rests on two documents of the Second Vatican Council. The dogmatic constitution Lumen gentium (1964), in paragraph 16, places Muslims within the Church's reflection on those who stand in various ways in relation to the people of God, noting that they profess the faith of Abraham and worship the one merciful God. The declaration Nostra aetate (28 October 1965) devotes its third paragraph to Muslims, whom it says the Church regards with esteem, and it invites both sides to move beyond past quarrels towards mutual understanding. Commentators have described the passage on Muslims as unprecedented and as a clear departure from earlier Catholic attitudes.

=== Institutions ===
The Holy See's dialogue with Muslims is conducted mainly through the body that grew out of the Secretariat for Non-Christians. In 1988 John Paul II's reorganisation of the Roman Curia replaced that secretariat with the Pontifical Council for Interreligious Dialogue, which is now the Dicastery for Interreligious Dialogue. The council sends an annual message to Muslims at the end of Ramadan, a practice John Paul II referred to in 1999. The Islamic-studies specialist Maurice Borrmans, a longtime consultant to the council, wrote that its documents continued to insist on the necessity of dialogue even when others questioned it.

Academic training in the field is provided by the Pontifical Institute for Arabic and Islamic Studies (PISAI), a Holy See institution in Rome that works under the Congregation for Catholic Education in close collaboration with the council. Pope Francis addressed its community in 2015 on the fiftieth anniversary of its transfer to Rome.

== Dialogue and papal encounters ==
=== John Paul II ===
On 6 May 2001, during a pilgrimage to Syria, John Paul II visited the Umayyad Mosque in Damascus and addressed Muslim leaders in its courtyard, an event usually described as the first visit by a pope to a mosque.

=== Benedict XVI ===
On 12 September 2006 Pope Benedict XVI delivered a lecture at the University of Regensburg that quoted a critical remark about Islam by a Byzantine emperor, provoking protests in several Muslim-majority countries. The pope said he was "deeply sorry" for any offence. A month later, on 13 October 2006, 38 Muslim scholars sent him an open letter, and on 13 October 2007 a wider group of 138 Muslim figures issued A Common Word Between Us and You, addressed to the pope and other Christian leaders. In November 2007 King Abdullah of Saudi Arabia visited the pope at the Vatican, the first meeting of its kind between a pope and a Saudi monarch.

The first seminar of the Catholic–Muslim Forum, a result of the exchange of letters, took place at the Vatican from 4 to 6 November 2008, with a Catholic delegation led by Cardinal Jean-Louis Tauran.

=== Francis and Al-Azhar ===
Al-Azhar University suspended its dialogue with the Vatican in 2011. On 23 May 2016 Pope Francis received the Grand Imam of Al-Azhar, Ahmed el-Tayeb, in the Apostolic Palace, in a meeting the Holy See Press Office described as a significant new step in Catholic–Islamic dialogue. The two leaders later signed the Document on Human Fraternity in Abu Dhabi on 4 February 2019.

=== Leo XIV ===
During his first journey abroad, Pope Leo XIV visited the Sultan Ahmed Mosque in Istanbul on 29 November 2025. It was his first visit to a Muslim place of worship as pope; he toured the building in silence and declined an invitation to pray.

== Diplomatic relations ==
The Holy See has diplomatic relations with most Muslim-majority states. In 2007 Vatican Radio reported that it maintained relations with 176 states and institutions, including many in the Islamic world, noting that Saudi Arabia had no formal ties. In 2023 Oman established full relations with the Holy See, leaving Saudi Arabia and the Maldives as the only Muslim-majority countries among the few states without diplomatic ties.

== See also ==
- Catholic Church and Islam
- Religion in Vatican City
- Islam in Italy
- Catholic–Muslim Forum
- Islam by country
