= Catholic–Muslim Forum =

The Catholic–Muslim Forum is a forum for dialogue between Catholics and Muslims. The first summit took place on 4–6 November 2008 in the Vatican with nearly fifty delegates. The chosen theme was "Love of God, Love of Neighbour."

== See also ==
- A Common Word Between Us and You
