= Islam in Italy =

Islam in Europe by percentage of country population 95–100%: Azerbaijan; 90–95%: Turkey; Kosovo; 50–70%: Albania; Bosnia and Herzegovina; Kazakhstan; 30–35%: North Macedonia; 10–20%: France; Sweden; Georgia; Montenegro; 5–10%: Austria; Belgium; Bulgaria; Denmark; Germany; Liechtenstein; Luxembourg; Netherlands; Russia; Switzerland; United Kingdom; Spain; Greece; 4–5%: Serbia; 2–4%: Italy; Finland; Norway; Malta; Slovenia; Cyprus (Note: Only takes into account the Muslim population residing on land controlled by the Republic of Cyprus.); 1–2%: Croatia; Ireland; Ukraine; Andorra; < 1%: Iceland; Armenia; Belarus; Czech Republic; Estonia; Hungary; Latvia; Lithuania; Moldova; Monaco; Poland; Portugal; Romania; San Marino; Slovakia

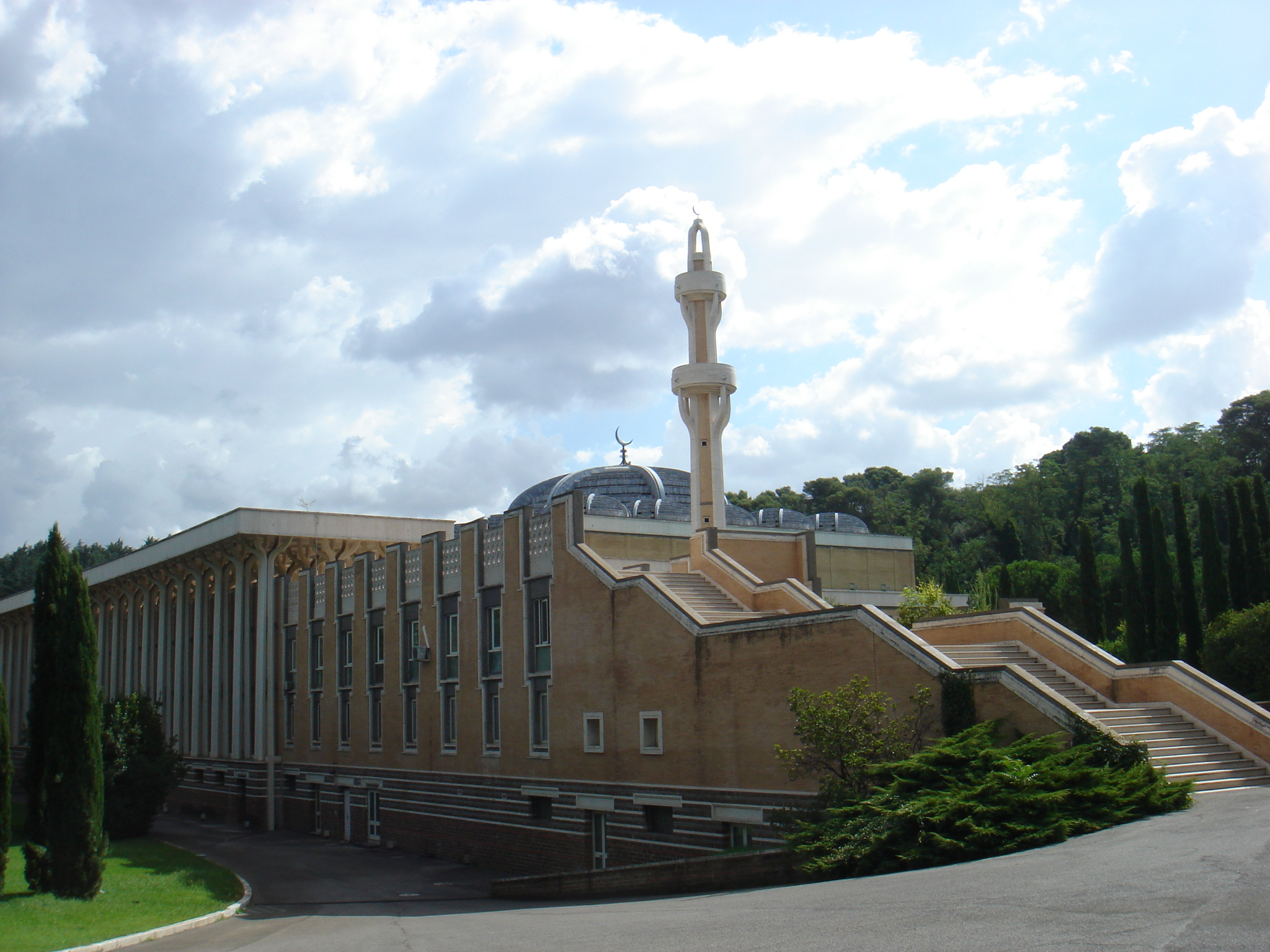
The Mosque of Rome, the biggest mosque in the Western world

Islam is a minority religion in Italy. Muslim presence in Italy dates back to the 9th century, when Sicily came under control of the Aghlabid dynasty. There was a large Muslim presence in Italy from 827 (the first occupation of Mazara) until the 12th century. The Norman conquest of Sicily led to a gradual decline of Islam, due to the conversions and emigration of Muslims toward Northern Africa. A small Muslim community however survived at least until 1300 (the Muslim settlement of Lucera). By the 1900s, with the Italian colonisation of Libya, Somalia, Eritrea and Albania, a new wave of Muslim migrants, mainly from these countries, entered Italy and remained the most dominant Muslim groups until the end of the 20th century, and often Islamic prayers were conducted in either Arabic, Oromo, Somali, or Albanian.

In more recent years, there has been migration from Pakistan, the Balkans (mainly Albania, Kosovo and Bosnia and Herzegovina), Bangladesh, India, Morocco, Egypt, and Tunisia.

== Legal status ==
Islam is not formally recognised by the Italian state. The official recognition of a religion different from Catholicism on behalf of the Italian Government is in fact to be approved by the President of the Republic under request of the Italian Minister of the Interior, following a signed agreement between the proposing religious community and the government. Such recognition does not merely depend on the number of followers of a given religion, and it requires congruence between the proposing religion principles and the Constitution. Official recognition gives an organised religion a chance to benefit from a national "religion tax", known as the Eight per thousand. Other religions, including Judaism and smaller groups, such as the Assemblies of God, The Church of Jesus Christ of Latter-day Saints and the Seventh-day Adventists, already enjoy the official recognition in the form of signed agreements with the Italian government. In late 2004, Italian minister, Giuseppe Pisanu set out in an attempt to create a unified leadership among the Muslim community. In 2005, the Consulta per l'Islam Italiano was created. This council is composed of 16 members of the Muslim population that are elected by the Ministry of Interiors. The goal of this council was for the Muslim community to have frequent and harmonious dialogues with the Italian government. The Consulta does not have any real power to make binding decisions. It exists as a platform for the Muslim community. Strong disagreement between Council members slows its work.

== History ==
=== Saracens ===
The Italian island of Pantelleria (which lies between the western tip of Sicily and North Africa) was conquered by the Umayyads in 700. The Arabs had earlier raided Roman Sicily in 652, 667 and 720 A.D.; Syracuse in the eastern end of the island was occupied for the first time temporarily in 708, but a planned invasion in 740 failed due to a rebellion of the Berbers of the Maghreb that lasted until 771 and civil wars in Ifriqiya lasting until 799.

Arab attacks on the island of Sardinia were less significant than those on Sicily and eventually failed to achieve the island's conquest, although they induced its separation from the Roman Empire, giving birth to a long period of Sardinian independence, the era of the Judicates.

==== Conquest of Sicily ====
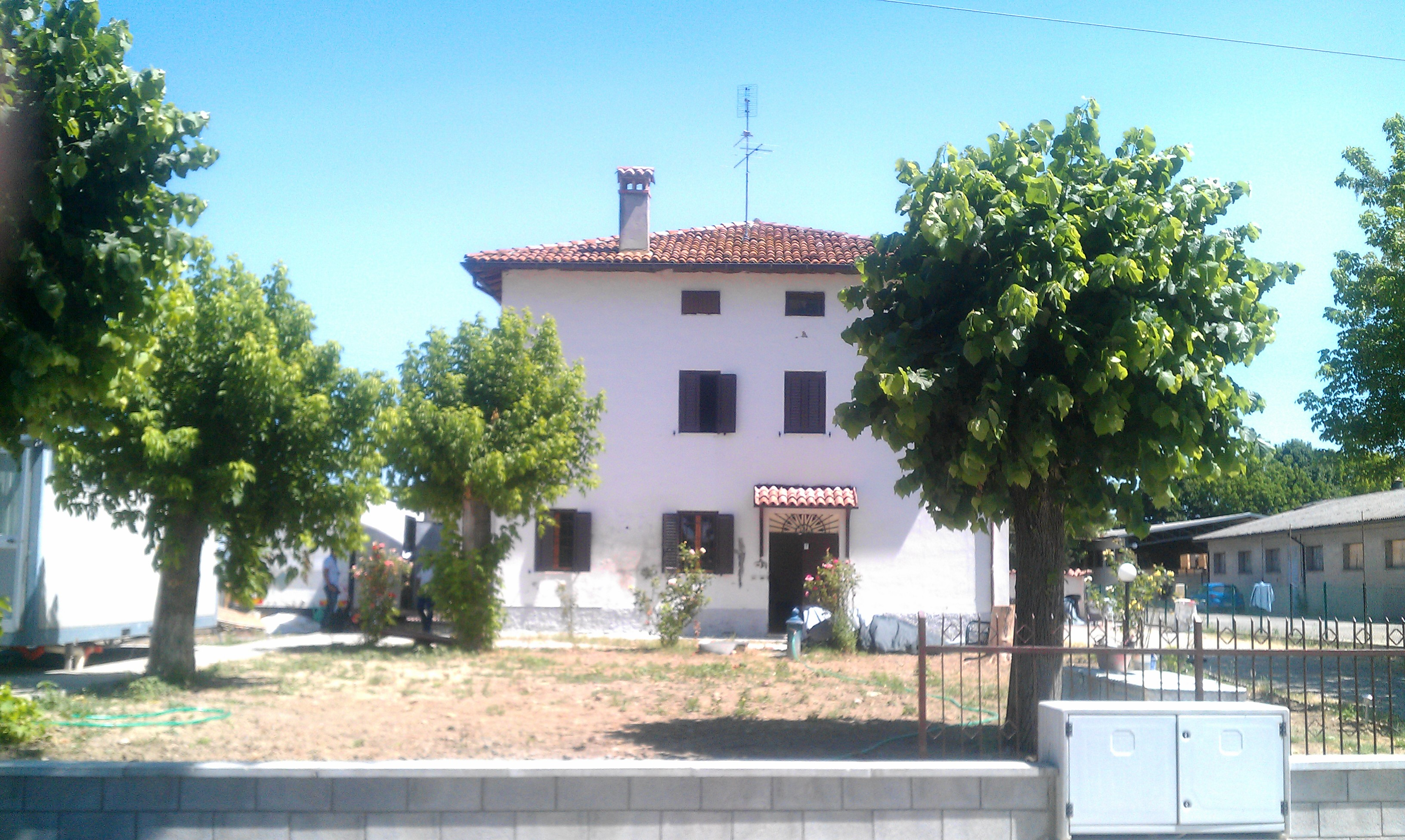
The Bologna Ahmadi Mosque

According to some sources, the conquest was spurred by Euphemius, a Byzantine commander who feared punishment by Emperor Michael II for a sexual indiscretion. After a short-lived conquest of Syracuse, he was proclaimed emperor but was compelled by loyal forces to flee to the court of Ziyadat Allah in Ifriqiya. The latter agreed to conquer Sicily, with the promise to leave it to Euphemius in exchange for a yearly tribute. To end the constant mutinies of his army, the Aghlabid magistrate of Ifriqiya sent Arabian, Berber, and Andalusian rebels to conquer Sicily in 827, 830 and 875, led by, among others, Asad ibn al-Furat. Palermo fell to them in 831, followed by Messina in 843, Syracuse in 878. In 902, the Ifriqiyan magistrate himself led an army against the island, seizing Taormina in 902. Reggio Calabria on the mainland fell in 918, and in 964 Rometta, the last remaining Byzantine toehold on Sicily.

Under the Muslims, agriculture in Sicily prospered and became export oriented. Arts and crafts flourished in the cities. Palermo, the Muslim capital of the island, had 300,000 inhabitants at that time, more than all the cities of Germany combined. The local population conquered by the Muslims were Romanized Catholic Sicilians in Western Sicily and partially Greek speaking Christians, mainly in the eastern half of the island, but there were also a significant number of Jews. These conquered people were afforded freedom of religion under the Muslims as dhimmis. The dhimmi were also required to pay the jizya, or poll tax, and the kharaj or land tax, but were exempt from the tax that Muslims had to pay (Zakaat). The payment of the Jizya is payment for state services and protection against foreign and internal aggression as non-Muslims did not pay the Zakaat tax. The conquered population could instead pay the Zakaat tax by converting to Islam. Large numbers of native Sicilians converted to Islam. However, even after 100 years of Islamic rule, numerous Greek-speaking Christian communities prospered, especially in north-eastern Sicily, as dhimmis. This was largely a result of the Jizya system which allowed co-existence. This co-existence with the conquered population fell apart after the reconquest of Sicily, particularly following the death of King William II of Sicily in 1189. By the mid-11th century, Muslims made up the majority of the population of Sicily.

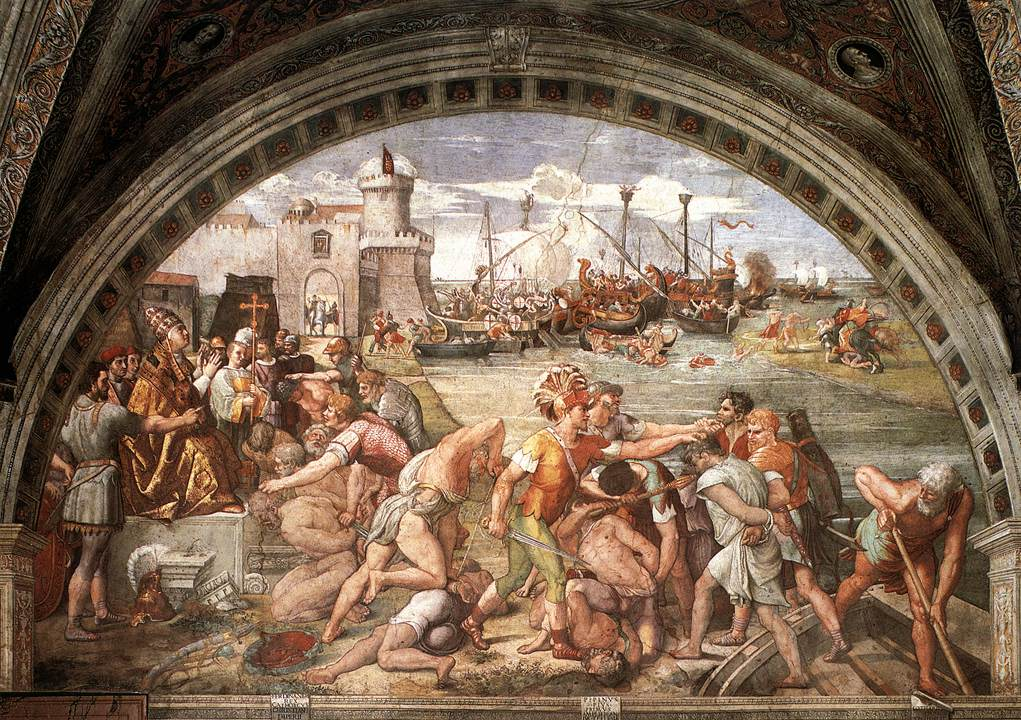
The battle at Ostia in 849 ended the third Arab attack on Rome.

==== Emirates in Apulia ====
From Sicily, the Muslims launched raids on the mainland and devastated Calabria. In 835 and again in 837, the Duke of Naples was fighting against the Duke of Benevento and appealed to the Sicilian Muslims for help. In 840 Taranto and Bari fell to the Muslims, and in 841 Brindisi. Muslim attacks on Rome failed in 843, 846 and 849. In 847 Taranto, Bari and Brindisi declared themselves emirates independent from the Aghlabids. For decades the Muslims ruled the Mediterranean and attacked the Italian coastal towns. Muslims occupied Ragusa in Sicily between 868 and 870.

Only after the fall of Malta in 870 did the occidental Christians succeed in setting up an army capable of fighting the Muslims. Over the next two decades, most of the territory held by Muslims on the mainland was liberated from Muslim rule. The Franco-Roman emperor Louis II reconquered Brindisi in 869, Bari in 871 and beat the Arabs at Salerno in 872. The Byzantines retook Taranto in 880. In 882 the Muslims had founded at the mouth of Garigliano between Naples and Rome a new base further in the north, which was in league with Gaeta, and had attacked Campania as well as Sabinia in Lazio. In 915, Pope John X organised a vast alliance of southern powers, including Gaeta and Naples, the Lombard princes and the Byzantines. The subsequent Battle of the Garigliano was successful, and all Saracens were captured and executed, ending any presence of Arabs in Lazio or Campania permanently. A hundred years later, the Byzantines called the Sicilian Muslims to ask for support against a campaign of German emperor Otto II. They beat Otto at the battle of Stilo in 982 and for the next 40 years largely succeeded in preventing his successors from entering southern Italy.

In 1002 a Venetian fleet defeated Muslims besieging Bari. After the Aghlabids were defeated in Ifriqiya as well, Sicily fell in the 10th century to their Fatimid successors, but claimed independence after fights between Sunni and Shia Muslims under the Kalbids.

==== Raids in Piedmont ====
After they had conquered the Visigoth Kingdom in Spain (729–765), the Arabs and Berbers from Septimania and Narbonne carried out raids into northern Italy, and in 793 again launched an offensive into northwestern Italy (Nicaea 813, 859 and 880). In 888, Andalusian Muslims set up a new base in Fraxinet near Fréjus in French Provence, from where they started raids along the coast and in inner France.

In 915, after the Battle of Garigliano, the Muslims lost their base in southern Lazio. In 926 King Hugh of Italy called the Muslims to fight against his northern Italian rivals. In 934 and 935 Genoa and La Spezia were attacked, followed by Nicaea in 942. In Piedmont the Muslims got as far as Asti and Novi, and also moved northwards along the Rhône valley and the western flank of the Alps. After defeating Burgundian troops, in 942–964 they conquered Savoy and occupied a part of Switzerland (952–960). To fight the Arabs, Emperor Berengar I, Hugh's rival, called the Hungarians, who in their turn devastated northern Italy. As a result of the Muslim defeat at the Battle of Tourtour, Fraxinet was lost and razed by the Christians in 972. Thirty years later, in 1002, Genoa was invaded, and in 1004 Pisa.

Pisa and Genoa joined forces to end Muslim rule over Corsica (Islamic 810/850-930/1020) and Sardinia. In Sardinia in 1015 the fleet of the Andalusian lord of Dénia come from Spain, settled a temporary military camp as a logistic base to control the Tyrrhenian Sea and Italian peninsula, but in 1016 the fleet was forced to leave its base due to the military intervention of maritime republics of Genoa and Pisa.

==== Sicily under the Normans ====
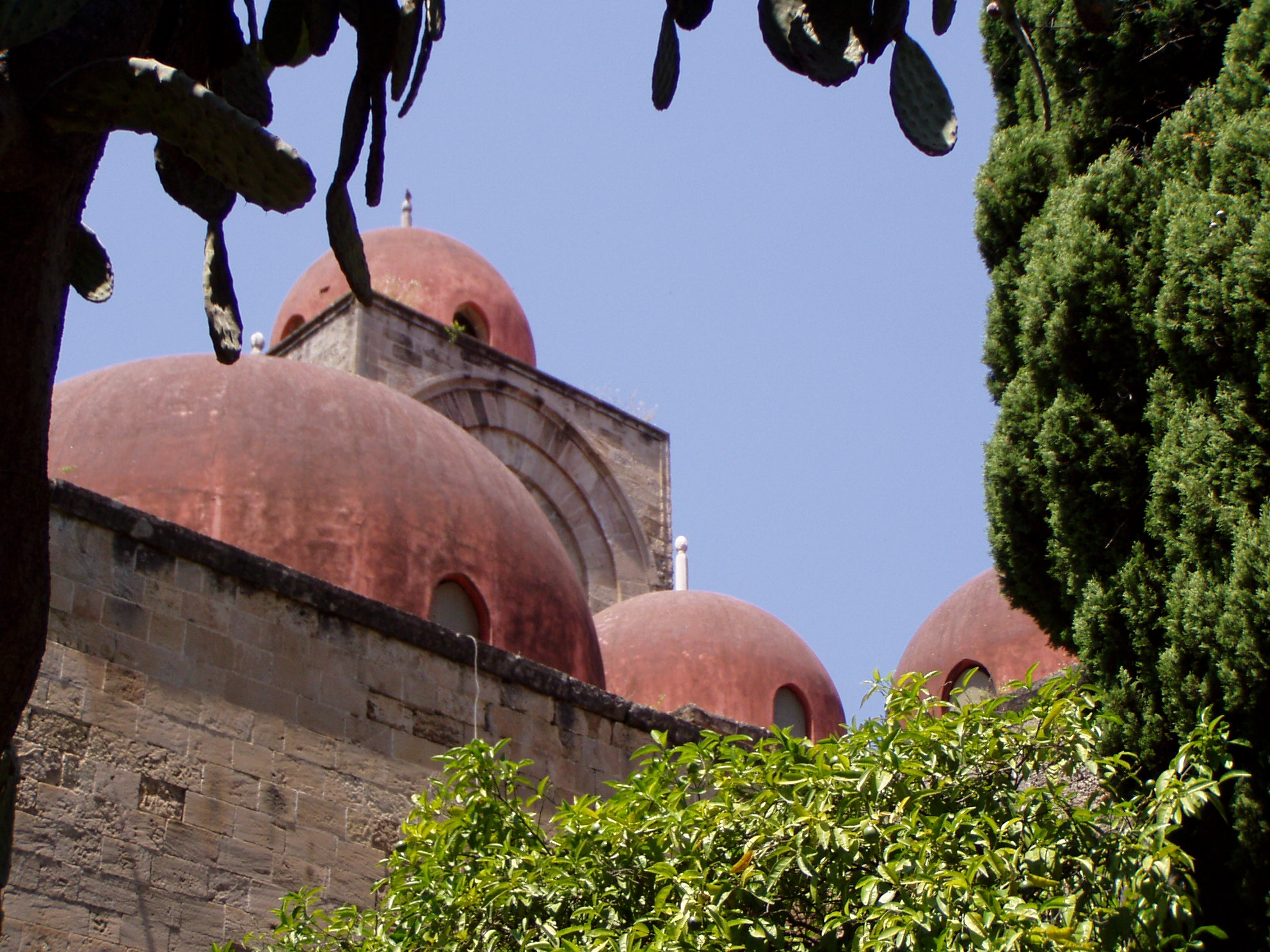
San Giovanni degli Eremiti: Arabian-Roman-Norman symbiosis

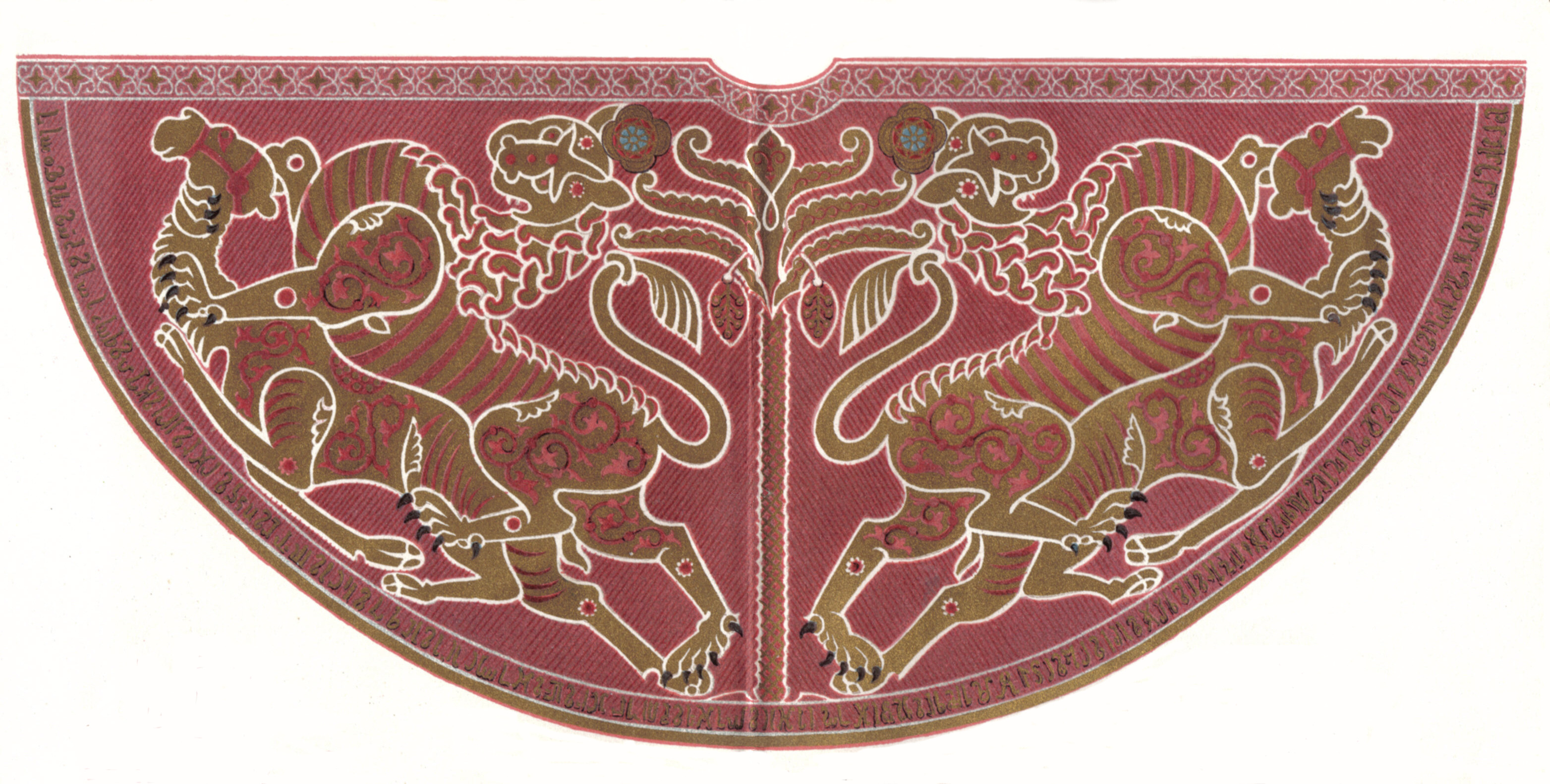
Arabic inscription on the Coronation Mantle of King Roger II of Sicily

The cultural and economical bloom in Sicily that had started under the Kalbids was interrupted by internecine fights, followed by invasions by the Tunisian Zirids (1027), Pisa (1030–1035), and the Romans (1027 onwards). Eastern Sicily (Messina, Syracuse and Taormina) was captured by the Byzantines in 1038–1042. In 1059 Normans from southern Italy, led by Roger I, invaded the island. The Normans conquered Reggio in 1060 (conquered by the Romanin 1027). Messina fell to the Normans in 1061; an invasion by the Algerian Hammadids to preserve Islamic rule was thwarted in 1063 by the fleets of Genoa and Pisa. The loss of Palermo in 1072 and of Syracuse in 1088 could not be prevented. Noto and the last Muslim strongholds on Sicily fell in 1091. In 1090–91, the Normans also conquered Malta; Pantelleria fell in 1123.

A small Muslim population remained on Sicily under the Normans. Roger II hosted at his court, among others, the famous geographer Muhammad al-Idrisi and the poet Muhammad ibn Zafar. At first, Muslims were tolerated by the Normans, but soon pressure from the Popes led to their increasing discrimination; most mosques were destroyed or made into churches. The first Sicilian Normans did not take part in the Crusades, but they undertook a number of invasions and raids in Ifriqiya, before they were defeated thereafter 1157 by the Almohads.

This peaceful coexistence in Sicily finally ended with the death of King William II in 1189. The Muslim elite emigrated at that time. Their medical knowledge was preserved in the Schola Medica Salernitana; an Arabian-Roman-Norman synthesis in art and architecture survived as Sicilian Romanesque. The remaining Muslims fled, for example to Caltagirone on Sicily, or hid out in the mountains and continued to resist against the Hohenstaufen dynasty, who ruled the island from 1194 on. In the heartland of the island, the Muslims declared Ibn Abbad the last Emir of Sicily.

To end this upheaval, emperor Frederick II, himself a Crusader, instigated a policy to rid Sicily of the few remaining Muslims. This cleansing was done in small part under Papal influence but mostly to create a loyal force of troops which could not be influenced by non-Christian infiltrators. In 1224–1239 he deported every single Muslim from Sicily to an autonomous colony under strict military control (so that they could not infiltrate non-Muslim areas) in Lucera in Apulia. Muslims were recruited however by Frederick in the army and constituted his faithful personal bodyguard, since they had no connection to his political rivals. In 1249, he ejected the Muslims from Malta as well. Lucera was returned to the Christians in 1300 at the instigation of the pope by King Charles II of Naples. The majority of the city's Muslim inhabitants were slaughtered or – as happened to almost 10,000 of them – sold into slavery. Their abandoned mosques were demolished, and churches were usually built in their place, including the cathedral of S. Maria della Vittoria. After the expulsions of Muslims in Lucera, Charles II replaced Lucera's Saracens with Christians, chiefly Burgundian and Provençal soldiers and farmers, following an initial settlement of 140 Provençal families in 1273. A remnant of the descendants of these Provençal colonists, still speaking a Franco-Provençal dialect, has survived until the present day in the villages of Faeto and Celle di San Vito.

=== During Spanish rule of Sicily ===
During Spanish rule of Sicily, and to escape the Spanish inquisition of the Moriscos (Muslims who had converted to Christianity) in the Iberian peninsula, a few Moriscos migrated to Sicily. During this time there were several attempts to rid Sicily of its extensive formerly Muslim 'Moor' population. The attacks were also directed against crypto-Muslim slaves and Sicilian renegades who refused to deny Islam during the 16th and the 17th centuries. However, it is doubtful that the order was carried out in practice. The main reason that some former Muslims were able to remain in Sicily was that they were openly supported by The Duke of Osuna, now officially installed as viceroy in Palermo, advocated to the Spanish monarch in Madrid for allowing the Moriscos to stay in Sicily.

=== 15th century: Ottomans in Otranto ===
During this century, the Ottoman Empire was expanding mightily in southeastern Europe. It completed the absorption of the Byzantine Empire in 1453 under Sultan Mehmet II by conquering Constantinople and Galata. It seized Genoa's last bastions in the Black Sea in 1475 and Venice's Greek colony of Euboea in 1479. Turkish troops invaded the Friuli region in northeastern Italy in 1479 and again in 1499–1503. The Apulian harbor town of Otranto, located about 100 kilometers southeast of Brindisi, was seized in 1480 (Ottoman invasion of Otranto), but the Turks were routed there in 1481 by an alliance of several Italian city-states, Hungary and France led by the prince Alphonso II of Naples, when Mehmet died and a war for his succession broke out. Cem Sultan, pretender to the Ottoman throne, was defeated despite being supported by the pope; he fled with his family to the Kingdom of Naples, where his male descendants were bestowed with the title of Principe de Sayd by the Pope in 1492. They lived in Naples until the 17th century and in Sicily until 1668 before relocating to Malta.

==== Attacks in the 16th century ====
It is a subject of debate whether Otranto was meant to be the base for further conquests. In any case, the Ottoman sultans had not given up their ambition to take over the Italian Peninsula and to finally install Islamic sovereignty after the conquest of Constantinople. After the conquests of Ragusa (Dubrovnik) and Hungary in 1526 and the defeat of the Turkish army at Vienna in 1529, Turkish fleets again attacked southern Italy. Reggio was sacked in 1512 by the famous Turkish corsair Khayr al-Din, better known by the nickname of Barbarossa; in 1526 the Turks attacked Reggio again, but this time suffered a setback and were forced to turn their sights elsewhere. In 1538 they defeated the Venetian fleet. In 1539 Nice was raided by the Barbary pirates (Siege of Nice), but an attempted Turkish landing on Sicily failed, as did the attempted conquest of Pantelleria in 1553 and the siege of Malta in 1565.

Next to Spain, the biggest contribution to the victory of the Christian "Holy League" in the battle of Lepanto in 1571 was made by the Republic of Venice, which between 1423 and 1718 fought eight costly wars against the Ottoman Empire. In 1594, the city of Reggio was again sacked by Cığalazade Yusuf Sinan Pasha, a renegade who converted to Islam.

=== Imperial Italian era ===
By the 19th century, Italy had finally reunified the country and engaged in a process of colonialism. Italy would conquer territories like Albania, Libya, Somalia and Eritrea; the majority of these colonies had predominantly Muslim population. This also resulted in a new wave of migration of the Muslim population to Italy, mainly from the Albanian Muslim communities due to proximity.

In 1937, Benito Mussolini proclaimed himself as the Protector of Islam and held the ceremonial Sword of Islam as an attempt to demonstrate his support for the Muslim population. During the World War II, Italy recruited Muslim soldiers from their colonies in Somalia, Libya and Eritrea to fight against the British and American forces, as well as supporting various fascist groups, notably the Albanian Fascist Militia and the Cham Albanians, majority of them were Muslims. Most of these Albanian Muslims were expelled by Greece after the WW2 ended, with some of them escaped to Italy instead of returning to Communist Albania.

== Present day ==
Muslim population in Italy by the year:
Year	Pop.	±%
1999	520,000	—
2009	1,200,000	+130.8%
2016	1,400,000	+16.7%
2022	1,500,000	+7.1%
1999 and 2009 estimates 2016 census 2022 census

According to a 2016 Pew Research Center projection and Brookings, there are 1,400,000 Muslims in Italy (2.3% of the Italian population), almost one third of Italy's foreign population (250.000 have acquired Italian citizenship). The majority of Muslims in Italy are Sunni, with a Shi'ite minority.

Despite undocumented immigrants representing a minority of the Muslims in Italy, considering that undocumented migrants and refugees predominantly come from Muslim countries, the issue of Islam in contemporary Italy has been linked by some political parties (particularly the Lega Nord) with immigration, and more specifically illegal immigration. Immigration has become a prominent political issue, as reports of boatloads of illegal immigrants (or clandestini) dominate news programmes, especially in the summertime. Police forces have not had great success in intercepting many of the thousands of clandestini who land on Italian beaches, mainly because of a political unwillingness, partly fostered by the EU, to address the issue. However, the vast majority of the clandestini landing in Italy are only using the country as a gateway to other EU states, due to the fact that Italy offers fewer economic opportunities and social welfare services for them than Germany, France, or the United Kingdom.

Muslims in Rome in 2018

While in medieval times, the Muslim population was almost totally concentrated in Insular Sicily and in the city of Lucera, in Apulia, it is today more evenly distributed, with almost 60% of Muslims living in the North of Italy, 25% in the centre, and only 15% in the South. Muslims form a lower proportion of immigrants than in previous years, as the latest statistical reports by the Italian Ministry of Interior and Caritas indicate that the share of Muslims among new immigrants has declined from over 50% at the beginning of the 1990s (mainly Albanians and Moroccans) to less than 25% in the following decade, due to the massive arrivals from eastern Europe.

Recent points of contention between ethnic Italians and the Muslim immigrant population include the strong presence of crucifixes in public buildings, including school classrooms, government offices, and hospital wards. Adel Smith has attracted considerable media attention by demanding that crucifixes in public facilities be removed. The Italian Council of State, in the Sentence No. 556, 13 February 2006, confirmed the display of the crucifix in government sponsored spaces. Smith was subsequently charged with defaming the Catholic religion in 2006.

In November 2016, Minister of the Interior Angelino Alfano reported that Italy had deported nine imams for inciting racial violence.

In January 2017, community groups representing around 70% of the Muslim community in Italy signed a pact with the government to "reject all forms of violence and terrorism" and to hold prayers in mosques in the Italian language or at least to have them translated.

== Conversion to Islam ==
The conversion of Italians to Islam has been rising since the year 2000. According to the Union of Islamic Communities in Italy (Ucoi), approximately 70,000 Italians have embraced Islam during this period.

=== By ethnicities and nationalities ===
Currently, Moroccans form the largest Muslim population, while Albanians form the second largest Muslim community in Italy. The Albanians are also the oldest living Muslim community in Italy as well, and have an official representative, the Union of Albanian Muslims in Italy (Unione degli Albanesi Musulmani in Italia).

=== Muslim prison population in Italy ===
As of 2013, of the total 64,760 detainees in Italy, approximately 13,500 (20.8%) came from countries with muslim majorities, mostly Morocco and Tunisia.

=== Mosques ===
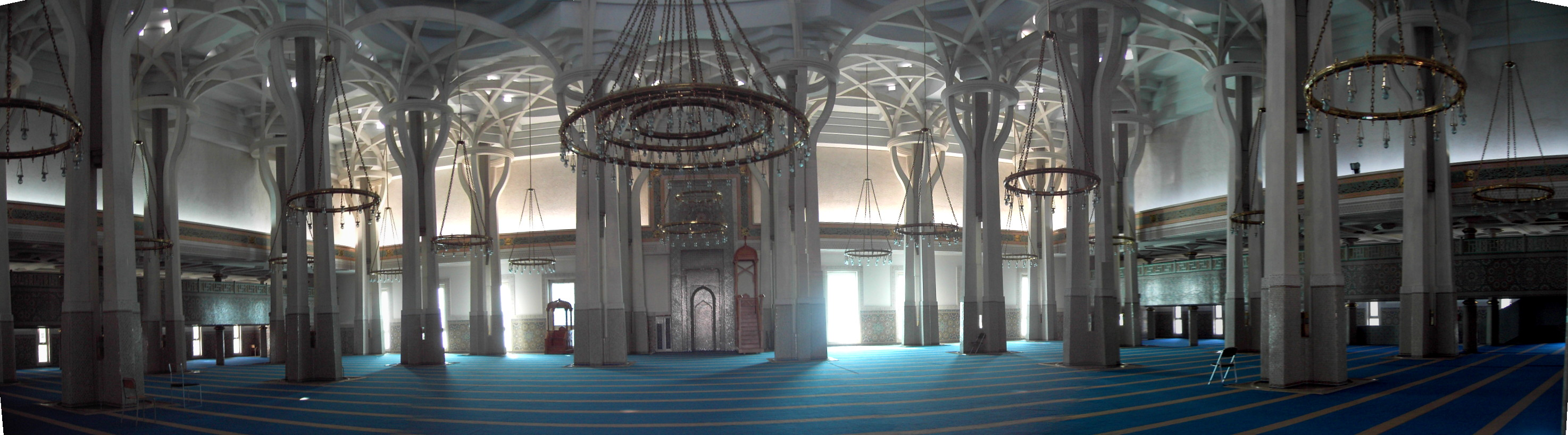
Interior of the Mosque of Rome

There are a total of eight mosques in Italy. While Italy is home to the fourth largest Muslim population in Europe, the number of mosques is small in comparison to France (which is home to over 2,200 mosques) and the United Kingdom (which is home to over 1,500 mosques). The scarcity of mosques in Italy is caused predominantly by the fact that Italy does not officially recognize Islam as a religion. Official state recognition would guarantee and protect places of worship, recognize religious holidays and allow access to public funding.

There have been a number of cases of extraordinary rendition of Muslim activists, as well as attempts by a past government to close mosques. Many mosque constructions are blocked by opposition of local residents. In September 2008 the Lega Nord political party was reported to have introduced a new bill which would have blocked the construction of new mosques in much of the country, arguing that Muslims can pray anywhere, and do not need a mosque. The construction of mosques had already been blocked in Milan. The bill was not approved.

=== Extremism ===
In 2007, the Moroccan imam at the mosque in Ponte Felcino in Perugia was deported by the Italian government for extremist views.

Deportation (expulsion) of foreign suspects have been the cornerstone of Italy's preventive counter-terrorism fight against suspected radicals. Every deportee is prohibited from re-entering Italy and therefore the entire Schengen Area, for a period of five years. Italy is able to use this method as many radicalized Muslims are first-generation immigrants and therefore have not yet acquired Italian citizenship. In Italy as elsewhere in Europe, prison inmates show signs of radicalization while incarcerated and in 2018, 41 individuals were deported upon release from prison. Of the 147 deported by the Italian government in the 2015–2017 all were related to jihadism and 12 were imams. From January 2015 to April 2018, 300 individuals were expulsed from Italian soil. The vast majority of the deportees come from North Africa and a smaller group come from the Balkans.

In the mid to late 2010s, a "homegrown" Islamist movement started to emerge in Italy with Islamists writing online content in Italian. While radicalized individuals may get in contact with fellow extremists at mosques, indoctrination and planning of violence take place elsewhere.

From 1 August 2016 to 31 July 2017, a total of eight imams were deported. The following twelve-month period, two were deported.

In July 2016, the Moroccan imam at the Asonna center in Noventa Vicentina was deported for reportedly expressing extremist views and for posing a security threat. While most extremists are banned for 5 to 10 years, Muhammed Madad was banned from returning for 15 years.

In March 2018, police carried out an anti-terrorist operation in Foggia against the Al Dawa unauthorized prayer hall located near the railway station. Egyptian Abdel Rahman Mohy preached to children using Islamic State propaganda.

According to prison authorities in Italy, in October 2018 there were 66 Muslim detainees who either had been sentenced or were awaiting trial for terrorism offences.

=== Islamophobia ===
Although Muslim population in Italy is very small compared to its counterparts in France, Germany, Britain and Spain, anti-Islamic feeling in Italy runs high, which became clear following the September 11 attacks and 7 July 2005 London bombings. Survey published in 2019 by the Pew Research Center found that 55% of Italians had an unfavourable view of Muslims. Much of the local Italian media correlates Islam to terrorism as a whole. This contributes to these unfavorable opinions.

=== Acts of violence against Islamic places of worship ===
The Mosque of Segrate in Milan.

In recent years there have been some acts of violence against Islamic places of worship in Italy:

- On 24 April 1994, a Molotov cocktail caused a fire at the small mosque in albenga's old
- Anti-Islamic attacks following the September 2001 bombings in Sicily and Southern Italy
- On 24 January 2004, a rock thrown from a car broke through the window of the entrance to the Mosque of Segrate,
- In April 2004, the Mosque of Mercy in Savona was the subject of discriminatory spray writing on the door, including a swastika.
- On the night of 3–4 August 2010, an arson attack was carried out in the offices of the Luce mosque in Bologna by unknown persons who entered it by cutting through the fences with a shear. The act has been condemned by the Jewish community in Bologna and by various political forces.

== Organizations ==
A minority of Italian Muslims belong to religious associations, the best known of which are:

- UCOII Unione delle Comunità Islamiche d'Italia (Union of the Islamic Communities and Organizations of Italy)
  - Since its founding, the union has been active in the political scene, recently attempting to become the primary Islamic liaison.
- CICI, Centro Islamico Culturale d'Italia, which has its seat in the Mosque of Rome, which is reputed to be the largest mosque in Europe.
- COREIS, Comunità Religiosa Islamica Italiana, which has its seat in Milan, but also a branch in Rome.
- USMI, Union of Muslim Students in Italy
  - Founded in the 1970s in Perugia and composed mostly of Jordanian, Syrian and Palestine students, the group's ideology is quite similar to the Muslim Brotherhood, the transnational Islamic movement in Egypt in the 1920s.

== Notable Muslims ==
- Occhiali Italian-born Ottoman corsair, beylerbey of the Regency of Algiers, and Grand Admiral of the Ottoman Navy
- Cığalazade Yusuf Sinan Pasha, Italian-born grand vizier of the Ottoman Empire and Grand Admiral of the Ottoman Empire
- Edoardo Agnelli, businessman
- Gabriele Torsello, freelance journalist
- Ahmad Gianpiero Vincenzo, founder and president of the organization Intelletuali Musulmani Italiani (Italian Muslim Intellectuals)
- Torquato Cardilli, diplomat
- Vinnie Paz, lyricist and singer
- Leda Rafanelli, author and anarchist
- Dr. Francesca Bocca Addaqre, Author, Theologist, Professor at Vita-Salute San Raffaele University.
- Hamza Roberto Piccardo, translator of official translation of Qur'an into italian.
- Pietrangelo Buttafuoco (Sicilian Politician/media personality)
- Yassine Lafram, Ex. President of UCOII, Participant in the Global Sumud Flotilla.
- Adel Smith, activist
- Dr. Giuseppe D'amico, Author, Anesthesia Professional
- Abd al Wahid Pallavicini, Sufi figure and founder of the Italian Islamic Religious Community (COREIS) and the Interreligious Studies Academy (Accademia ISA)
- Khaby Lame, social media personality
- Ghali, rapper
- Baby Gang, rapper
- Shirin Ramzanali Fazel, writer

== See also ==
- History of Islam in southern Italy
- Norman–Arab–Byzantine culture
- Moors
- Religion in Italy
- List of Italian religious minority politicians
- Islamic dress in Europe
- Othello
