= Italian Islamic Confederation =

Islamic organization based in Italy

The Italian Islamic Confederation (Italian: Confederazione Islamica Italiana, CII) is one of the three main Italian Sunni Islamic organisations in Italy, along with the Union of Islamic Communities and Organisations in Italy (UCOII) and the Italian Islamic Religious Community.

The CII, promoted by the Italian Cultural Islamic Centre of Italy (which runs the Mosque of Rome) and indirectly by the Muslim World League, was established in 2012 during a congress which saw the participation of representatives from other religious denominations. The CII sought to represent moderate Islam, as opposed to the more radical version proposed by the UCOII.

== See also ==
- Islam in Italy
