= Islamophobia in Italy =

Prejudice towards Islam or Muslims in Italy

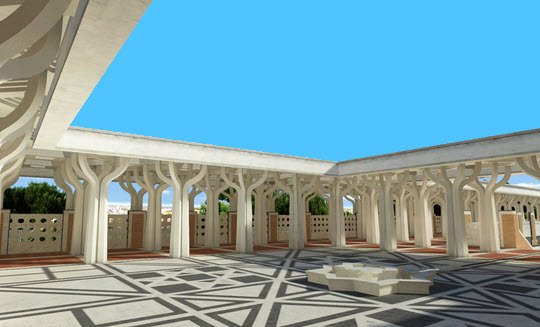
The Mosque of Rome, the Western world's largest mosque

Islamophobia is characterized by a hatred against the religion of Islam and those perceived to be following the religion, typically fueled by fear and hatred and sustained through the evolving stereotype of the Muslim identity. It has become increasingly common and widespread throughout the world, in particular since the September 11 attacks in the United States, however it existed in society before this. In Europe, there has been an increase in cultural tensions between national majorities and marginalized Muslim countries, as shown by the results of the 2009 elections in the European Parliament with a large vote toward anti-immigration. Within Italy, there is a large Islamic presence of approximately 1.25 million people, stemming from the widespread migration and settlement that began in the 1970s, in particular from North Africa. The Islamic population of Italy increasingly faces challenges when it comes to their position in society, with the increasing cultural hostility that stems from the growing presence of Islamophobia. Islamophobia has been present within Italy for many years; for example, in the 1920s, Muslims were not permitted to settle in the country due to their religion being viewed as "against common morality." The intensity of Islamophobia in Italy is enhanced by the historical religious structure of the state – which is heavily based on the Catholic Church.

== Definition ==
There is no official legal or social definition for Islamophobia; however, it can be defined as a "form of racial prejudice", especially as a political force, and "manifests as a distorted simplification of Islam and the Muslim world". Almost a quarter of the world's population identify as Muslim, making it an extremely prevalent religion. Furthermore, Islamophobia often overlaps with other forms of discrimination and religious bias, making it difficult to recognize.

== Islam in Italy ==
=== Prevalence ===
There was a large Muslim presence in Italy from 827 until the 12th century. According to a 2011 Pew Research Center report, there were approximately 1,583,000 Muslims in Italy as of 2010, about 2.6% of the Italian population.

=== Theories ===
There are multiple sources of anti-Islamic prejudices, with reasoning often being based on "race, ethnicity, cultural differences, socio-economics". Despite the September 11 attacks on the United States immensely enhancing and propelling the prevalence of Islamophobia, the sentiments of anti-Islamic thought have existed well prior to this, in part due to the perceived lack of integration of Muslim migrants in Europe. A discussion in contemporary literature focuses on the concept that Islamophobia is becoming institutionalized, rather than individuals acting on their own.

There is yet another source of anti-Islamic racism, which stems from an Islamophobic intolerance by Italian Catholics who espouse Christianity. The Cardinal of Bologna, Giacomo Biffi, also claimed that Europe should go back to its Christian origins to resist the "ideological assault of Islam." Further, Biffi states that he considers Muslims as a threat to Italian cultural identity and as posing legal and social problems.

== Contributions ==
Islamophobia has existed around the world for an extensive time as well as within Italy; however, it has become increasingly prevalent since the 11 September Attacks. The new global hegemony structure of the 21st century has allowed for the expansion of anti-Islamic discourse, with "Muslim populations finding themselves increasingly encoded as the new 'evil other'". One of the main contributing forces to the increase in Islamophobia is the media, through the multiple platforms that present powerful channels for information and ultimately opinions to spread and cultivate in society. The media "bear a heavy responsibility in their representation of minority groups." Due to the reaction that prevailed following the 11 September attacks, a significant shift was seen, with prejudices towards Islam becoming more common. In a world of free media, where freedom of speech is a defining factor, the circulation of misinformed and prejudiced information is inevitable. This has ultimately allowed for the spread of Islamophobia. The media's use of ambiguous and duplicitous words and ways allow for public speculation and the spread of often misinformed and prejudiced sentiments towards Muslim people. This was demonstrated with the media reports on the various terrorist attacks in Europe since 11 September, including those in Nice and Berlin, where the term "Islamic terrorism" was used, leading to an increase in prejudice toward the religion.

=== Social media ===
In particular, social media has provided a significant platform for the expression of anti-Islamic sentiments, providing a powerful outlet for racist and xenophobic hate messages. The Islamophobia in Europe report identifies that in 2014, there was a total of 347 recorded cases of racist expressions on various social networks reported on the UNAR (National Office Against Racial Discrimination).

=== Legislations ===
Current legislations that are in place in Italy are contributing to the anti-Islamic sentiments, particularly those that make the migrant position in the country precarious. This includes the ‘Bossi-Fini’ law of 2002 on immigration which introduced criminal sanctions for persons who are caught illegally entering the country, which created a sense of hostility against migrants. A further development of this law in 2005 which improved the instruments to fight the threat of terrorist organisations. In 2009, the Italian Parliament passed further laws on the topic of immigration, including the Law No. 94/2009. on "provisions relating to public safety." The combination of these laws among others became part of a "security package," part of which criminalises illegal immigration. Such laws have incited concerns among institutional and civil society actors, with The Council of Europe stating that "concern about security cannot be the only basis for immigration policy." Such laws have also sparked questions about the welfare of immigrants within Italy.

== Incidents ==
There are varying estimates of the presence of anti-Islamic sentiments within Italy. Anti-Islamic incidents have occurred within and around Italy for decades, however their severity and frequency has significantly increased since 11 September 2001. The psychosis among the general population of the possibility of a terrorist attack is becoming increasingly high in Italy and Europe in general, due in part to the many incidents related to Islamic terrorism in surrounding countries, including the attacks in Nice, Rouen, Reutlingen and Berlin. Despite these attacks being perpetrated by a small minority of extremists, it has led to a widespread consensus and prejudice of Islam as a violent religion, and has contributed to various anti-Islamic incidents.

=== Within Italy ===
Within the employment industry, incidents of anti-Islam have been reported. Under legislation, recruitment in the public sector requires the possession of Italian or EU citizenship. Whereas, in the private sector, a lack of adequate education among the immigrant population has led to a low percentage of immigrants in high-skilled jobs.

Within Italian politics, anti-Islam sentiments have been identified as more apparent since 11 September, particular from right-wing political alignments.

==== Specific incidents ====
No specific incident have occurred in Italy, except for a Northern League rally where was stated that there is a "risk that the white race disappears and is replaced by migrants.”

- March 2018 – the Northern League's candidate for president of the Lombardy region of Italy stated that there is a "risk that the white race disappears and is replaced by migrants."

== Responses ==
=== Negative ===
The Lega Nord, which is a right-wing political party in Italy, has increasingly been linked to anti-Islamic discourse since 2001, introducing multiple "federal reforms and immigration law and order." Multiple significant Lega representatives have been involved in a number of infamous incidents which prompted protests by the Italian public. In 2016, a controversial legislative issue occurred with the adoption of a regional law that regulated the construction of new placed of worship, including mosques. This is a clear breach of the fundamental right of religious freedom which is enshrined in the Italian constitution, and was dubbed the "Anti-Mosque Law." Furthermore the respinimenti measure taken by the Lega Nord government rejected multiple boats of immigrants mainly from North-Africa. In 2016, some leaders in Italy briefly discussed copying the French ban on burkinis at some beaches in France, but ultimately decided not to implement that ban. At least one Italian locality's Lega mayor attempted to ban Muslim prayers and burkinis at the beach in 2024, leading to tensions in the city.

An Italian political scientist known as Giovanni Santori, wrote in his book that Muslim immigrants are an "invasive" presence who will bring "disorder and desegregation". His writing had an impact on many people in Italy who seem to agree with his statements that Islamophobia stems from a "cultural-religious" refusal.

On 28 September 2001, a week after the 11 September attacks, the Corriere della Sera, an Italian newspaper, published an article titled "Rage and Pride." In this article, the author accuses the West of being "too soft" on Islam and Muslim immigrants.

=== Positive ===
There have been multiple initiatives undertaken by the Italian government and other institutions in an attempt to render the anti-Islamic sentiments that are present in society. This includes suggestions presented by government representatives to introduce practices and measures that support and promote equality among the population and a reduction in prejudicial attitudes towards the Muslim population.

Measures taken to suppress the spread of Islamophobia through the media in particular in social media platforms are shown through the work of the UNARs Media and Social Network Observatory on hate speech.

A new project has been undertaken to combat Islamophobia called "Stop Islamophobia." This project is taking place from November 2018 – October 2020 and is working to address the root causes of Islamophobia in Italy and Europe.

== Statistics ==
Italians who responded to the Ipsos Perils of Perception Survey of 2016, were presented with the statement: "All further migration from mainly Muslim countries should be stopped’". As the report reveals, the majorities in all but two of the ten states agreed to this statement with 51% agreement in Italy.

The Eurobarometer on discrimination addresses this topic showing that 39% of Italian respondents say they would be uncomfortable working with a Muslim person. In addition, only 41% of Italian respondents said that they would feel at ease if one of their children was in a love relationship with a Muslim person.
