= Italian Islamic Religious Community =

Islamic organization based in Italy

The Italian Islamic Religious Community (Italian: Comunità Religiosa Islamica Italiana, COREIS) is one of the three main Italian Sunni Islamic organisations in Italy, along with the Union of Islamic Communities and Organisations in Italy and the Italian Islamic Confederation.

The COREIS, inspired by René Guénon and Sufism, was established in 1993 in Milan as the International Association for the Information On Islam by the impulse of Abd al Wahid Pallavicini and took the current name in 1997. The organisation is currently presided by Abu Bakr Moretta and one of the two vice presidents is Yahya Sergio Yahe Pallavicini.

== See also ==
- Islam in Italy
