= Mosque of Segrate =

Mosque in Milan, Lombardy, Italy

- Moschea di Segrate

- Location of the mosque in Lombardy

Religion
- Affiliation: Sunni Islam
- Ecclesiastical or organizational status: Mosque
- Status: Active

Location
- Location: Segrate, Lombardy
- Country: Italy
- Interactive map of Mosque of Segrate
- Coordinates: 45°29′26″N 9°15′39″E

Architecture
- Completed: 1988

Specifications
- Dome: One
- Minaret: One

The Mosque of Segrate (Italian: Moschea di Segrate), also known as Masjid al-Rahmàn or Mosque of the Merciful, is a mosque in Segrate, Italy, located on the border to the Milano Due suburb. It was the first mosque with a dome and minaret to be built in Italy after the demolition of the last mosques in Lucera in 1300. The mosque opened on 28 May 1988, and it has been, ever since, Milan's most important mosque and the second-most important mosque in Italy after the Mosque of Rome.

The mosque depends on the cultural association "Muslim Centre for Milan and Lombardy", which publishes one of the most important Muslim magazines in Italian, Il messaggero dell'Islam ("The Messenger of Islam").

== Gallery ==
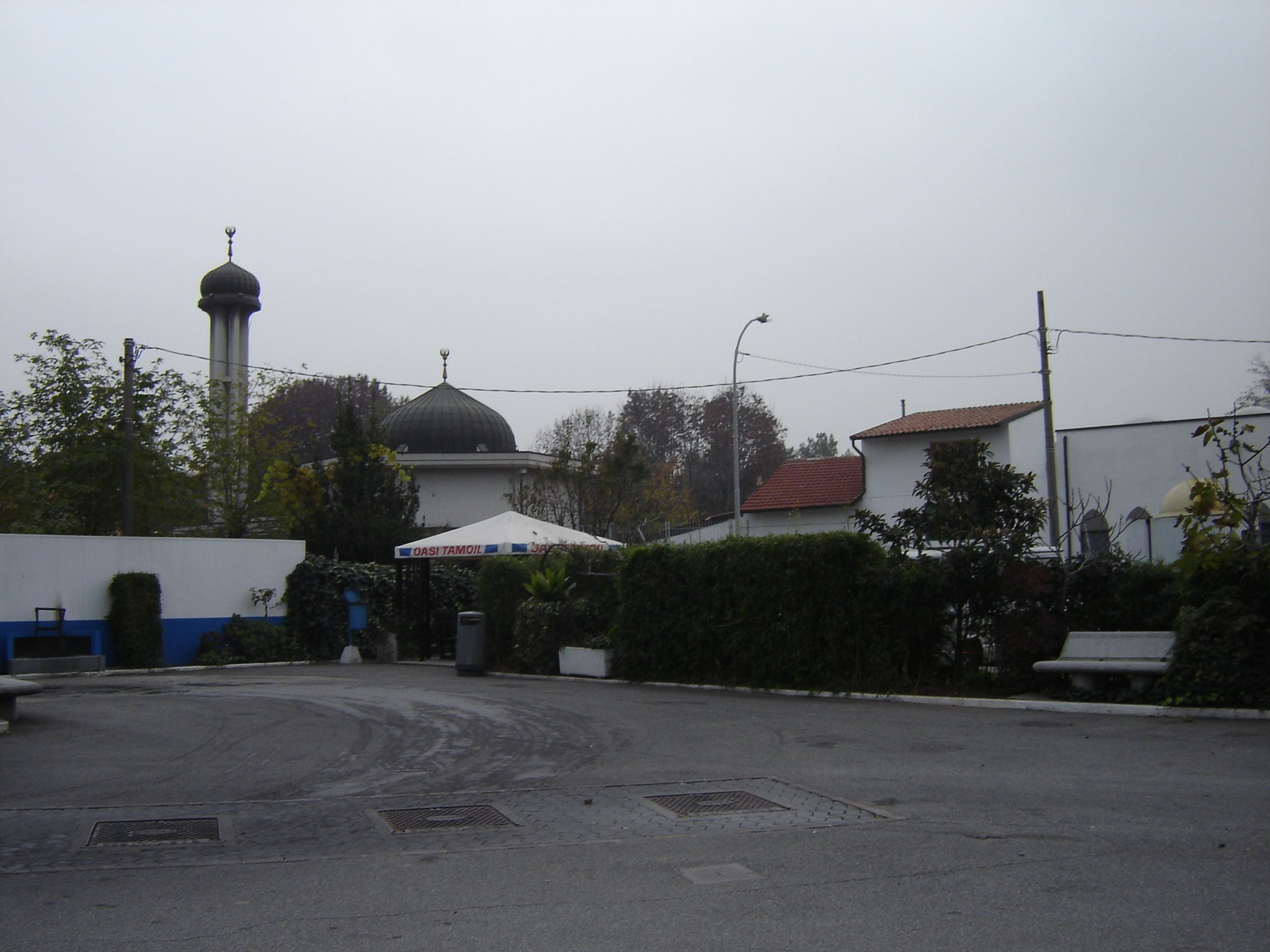

== See also ==
- Islam in Italy
- List of mosques in Europe
