= Ahmad Gianpiero Vincenzo =

Ahmad Gianpiero Vincenzo (born 1961 in Naples) is a leader of the Italian Muslim community. A 1990 convert to Islam, he is a founder and president of the organization Intelletuali Musulmani Italiani (Italian Muslim Intellectuals).

In November 2008, Vincenzo, as a representative of the Mosque of Rome, was received by Pope Benedict XVI at the first summit of the Catholic-Muslim Forum that was formed to improve interfaith relations following a 2006 speech by Benedict in which he was understood by many to be linking Islam with violence. He has called for efforts to combat Islamic extremism.

Vincenzo also advises the Italian Senate's Constitutional Affairs Commission on matters related to immigration.
