= Abd al Wahid Pallavicini =

Italian Islamic preacher

- Born: Felice Pallavicini; Milan, Italy
- Died: 12 November 2017; Milan, Italy
- Occupations: Ulama, preacher, doctor

Abd al Wahid Pallavicini (née Felice Pallavicini; 1926, Milan, Italy - November 12, 2017, Milan) was a leading figure of Sufism in Europe. In France, he founded the Institut des hautes études islamiques (IHEI), in Lyon, the Italian Islamic Religious Community (COREIS), and the Academy of Interreligious Studies (Accademia ISA).

== Early life and education ==
Abd al Wahid Pallavicini was born in Milan in 1926. After studying medicine, his spiritual quest led him to convert to Islam in 1951 thanks to the teachings of Titus Burckhardt.

== Career ==
After a trip to Singapore, he received authorization to lead an autonomous branch of the Ahmadiyyah Idrisiyyah Shadhiliyyah brotherhood that was inspired by René Guénon in Europe, Abd al Wahid Pallavicini, and was honored with the title of sheikh (teacher). He subsequently founded a community of Muslims in Italy and France in the 1980s, linked to traditional Sufism.

Very involved in inter-religious dialogue, he was chosen to represent "Italian Islam" at the first inter-religious meeting for peace organized in Assisi in 1986 by Pope John Paul II.

At the 10th International Theological Conference held in 2003, he argued that his Muslim but non-Arab status was a bridge linking the three great religions connected to Jerusalem.

== Family ==
Abd al Wahid was a descended of the Pallavicini family, an ancient Italian noble family whose name dates back to the 11th century. In particular, he is part of the Lombard Pallavicini banch.

His son Yahya Sergio Yahe Pallavicini, imam of the al-Wahid mosque in Milan, was one of 138 Muslim representatives who sent a letter to the Vatican in 2007 calling for a new dialogue on cohabitation between the two religions, and who subsequently spoke to Pope Benedict XVI on the subject in 2008. He also is the current President of COREIS.

== Publications ==
- A Sufi Master's Message: In Memoriam René Guénon, Milan, Archè, 1981. (translated to English in 2011)
- L’Islam intérieur, Paris, Bertillat, 1995, 2013.
- Allah, le nom de Dieu en Islam, Beyrouth, Al Bouraq, 2017
