= Union of Islamic Communities and Organisations in Italy =

Islamic organization based in Italy

The Union of Islamic Communities and Organisations in Italy (Italian: Unione delle Comunità e Organizzazioni Islamiche in Italia, UCOII) is one of the three main Italian Sunni Islamic organisations in Italy, along with the Italian Islamic Religious Community and the Italian Islamic Confederation.

== History ==
The UCOII, founded in Ancona in 1990, is the product of the fusion of various previously existing organizations: such as the Syrian and Palestinian components of the Unione degli Studenti Musulmani in Italia (USMI) organization, some female Islamic organizations such as Islam Donne and the contribution of some individuals such as Hamza Roberto Piccardo. Hamza Roberto Piccardo is a former militant of Autonomia Operaia who converted to Islam and is currently the director of the publishing house Libreria islamica (formerly known as “Al Hikma”).

The presidency initially had been assumed by Nour Dachan, a leader of the Syrian component of the Muslim Brotherhood. The secretary position initially had been assumed by Ali Abu Shwaima, a leader of the Palestinian component of the same organization; successively the position has gone to Roberto Piccardo.

== Criticisms ==
The mosques affiliated to UCOII are overwhelmingly directly or indirectly linked to the Muslim Brotherhood and for such ties the association has been sourly contested.

The UCOII claims that such ties are limited to the personal militancy of their leadership and the management of UCOII relates more closely to other groups such as: the European Council for Fatwa and Research, European Islam, scholars like the Mufti of Egypt Ali Gomaa, Tariq Ramadan. And the UCOII focusses on the scholarship of Islamic feminists and to the writings of Italian converts and Muslim youths and students in Italy.

However, the European Council for Fatwa and Research is led by Yusuf al-Qaradawi, the leading ideologue of the Muslim Brotherhood. Ali Gomaa is also a member of the organization, while Tariq Ramadan is its leader in Europe and the grandson of its founder Hasan al-Banna. In 2014 the Muslim Brotherhood was declared a terrorist organization by UAE

== Sources ==
- Andrea Pacini: "I musulmani in Italia. Dinamiche organizzative e processi di interazione con la società e le istituzioni italiane", in S. Ferrari [a cura di], Musulmani in Italia. La condizione giuridica delle comunità islamiche, il Mulino, Bologna (2000).
- "Enciclopedia delle religioni in Italia" / CESNUR. [A cura di] Massimo Introvigne ... [et al.]. - Leumann (Torino) : Elledici, 2001. - 1047 S.; (ital.) ISBN 88-01-01596-8
