= Hamza Roberto Piccardo =

Italian Islamic leader (born 1952)

Hamza Roberto Piccardo (born October 7, 1952) was a member of the Directive Council of UCOII, the Union of Islamic Communities in Italy, as well as spokesperson of the European Muslim Network. He is not currently serving any executive position in UCOII.

After the end of his military service in 1974, Piccardo went to Africa and crossed the Sahara desert. He met Muslims there and learned about Islam. He converted to Islam in 1975. In 1984 he started to pray and about five years later, he started fasting.

He founded the publishing house Al Hikma in 1993 and published the first edition of the Quran in Italian translated by Muslims, among other books.
