= Mosque of Rome =

Mosque in Parioli, Rome, Italy

- Moschea di Roma
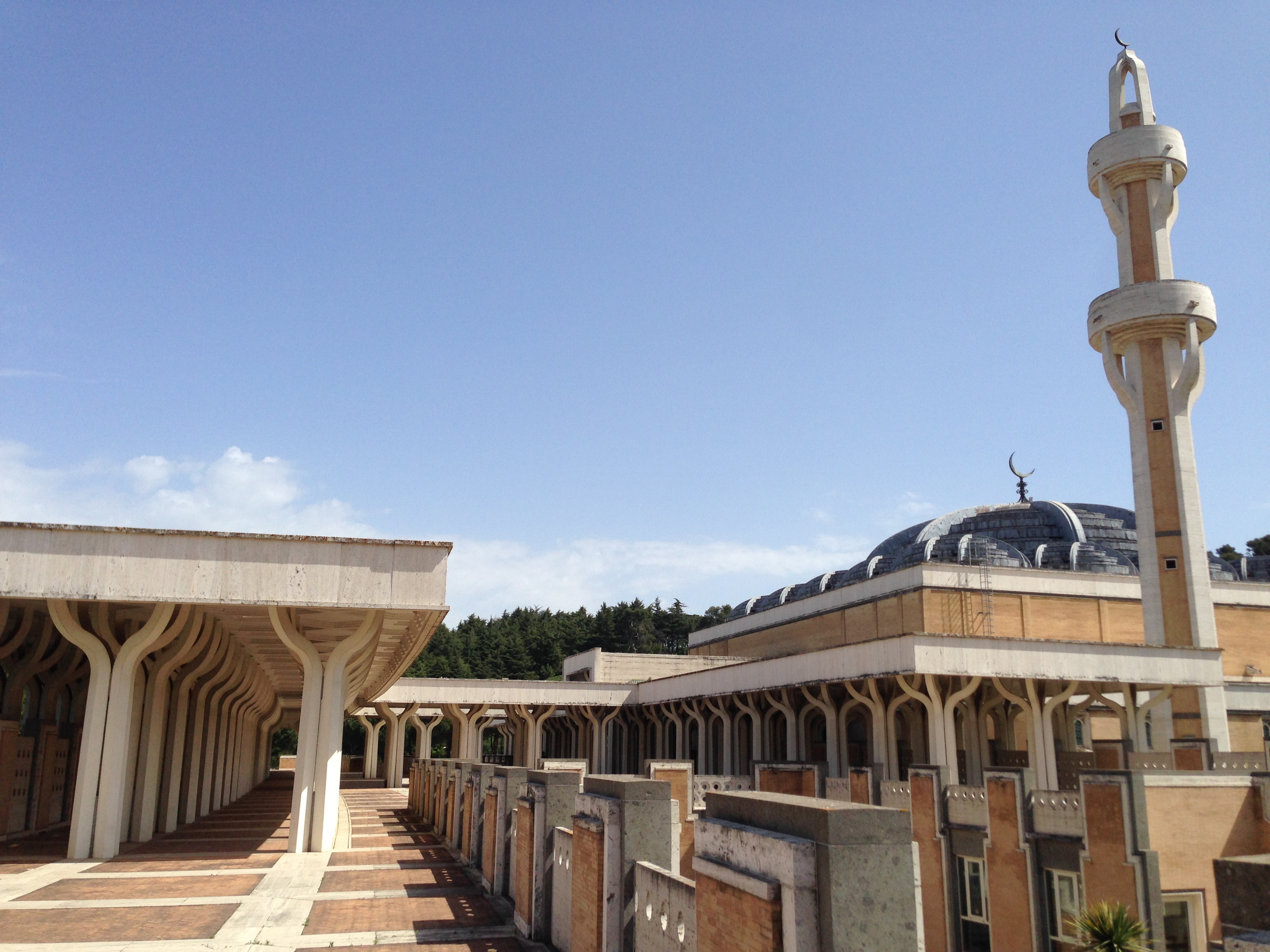
- The mosque in 2016

- Location of the mosque in Rome

Religion
- Affiliation: Sunni Islam
- Ecclesiastical or organisational status: Friday mosque
- Leadership: Muhammad Hassan, Abdulghaffar (Chief Imam and Khatib)
- Status: Active

Location
- Location: Parioli, Rome
- Country: Italy
- Interactive map of Mosque of Rome
- Coordinates: 41°56′5.17″N 12°29′42.8″E

Architecture
- Architects: Paolo Portoghesi, Vittorio Gigliotti, Sami Mousawi, Nino Tozzo
- Completed: 1994
- Construction cost: €40 million

Specifications
- Capacity: 12,000 worshipers
- Dome: 1 + 16 smaller domes
- Dome height (outer): 20 m (66 ft)
- Dome dia. (outer): 8 m (26 ft)
- Minaret: 1
- Minaret height: 43 m (141 ft)

The Mosque of Rome (Italian: Moschea di Roma), also known as the Great Mosque of Rome, is a Friday mosque situated in Parioli, Rome, Italy. With a land area of 30,000 square metres (320,000 sq ft), it is the largest mosque in the Western world and can accommodate more than 12,000 worshipers. The building is located in the Acqua Acetosa area, at the foot of the Parioli Mounts, north of the city. It is also the seat of the Italian Islamic Cultural Centre (Italian: Centro Culturale Islamico d'Italia).

In addition to being a meeting place for religious activities, it provides cultural and social services variously connecting Muslims together. It also holds teachings, wedding ceremonies, funeral services, exegesis, exhibitions, conventions, and other events, despite being located in an area with relatively few Muslims.

== Architecture ==
=== Construction ===
The mosque was jointly founded by the exiled Prince Muhammad Hasan of Afghanistan and his wife, Princess Razia and was financed by Fahad of Saudi Arabia, Custodian of the Two Holy Mosques as well as by some other states of the Muslim world, including Bangladesh ruled by President Hussain Muhammad Ershad. The project was designed and directed by Paolo Portoghesi, Vittorio Gigliotti and Sami Mousawi. The opening ceremony was led by Pope John Paul II.

Its planning took more than ten years: the Roman City Council donated the land in 1974, but the first stone was laid only in 1984, in the presence of then President of the Italian Republic Sandro Pertini, with its inauguration on 21 June 1995.

Historical opposition to the idea of a mosque in Rome can be allegedly traced back to Benito Mussolini, who famously declared a mosque would never be built in Rome unless a Catholic church was also built in Mecca. However, it was recorded that Mussolini decided to build a Mosque with King Victor Emmanuel III also supporting the decision but opposition from the church stopped it. Following the announcement of the mosque, there was opposition from the general populace. However, much of this dissipated when Pope John Paul II gave his blessing for the project. One issue that had to be agreed was the height of the minaret and its effect on the Rome skyline. In the end, the issue was resolved by shortening the height of the minaret slightly to be below that of the dome of St Peter's by approximately one meter (3.3 ft).

=== Design ===
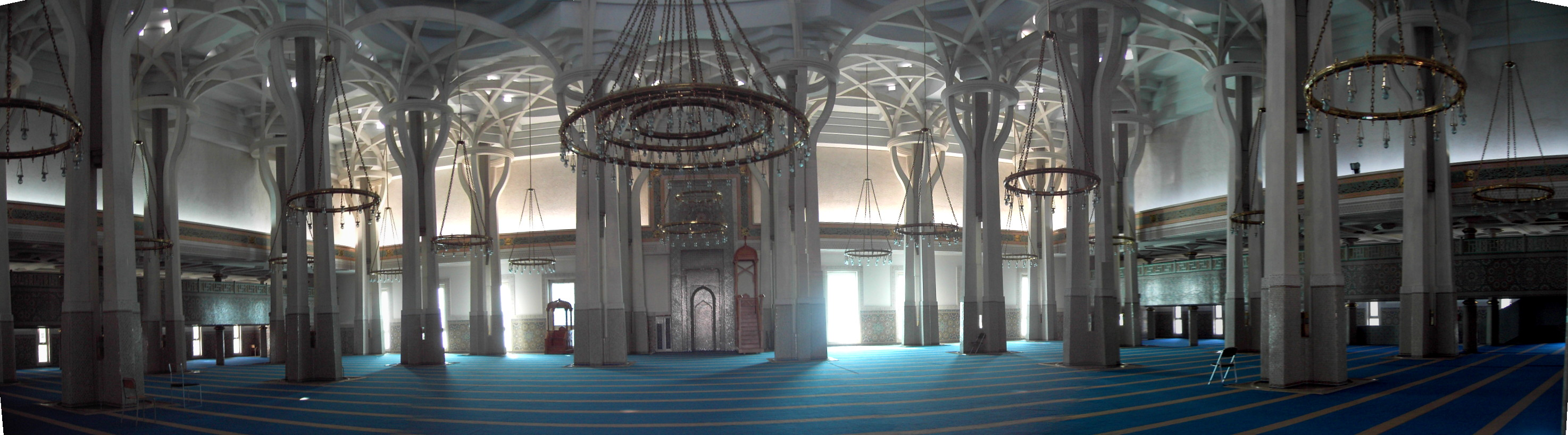
The main hall

The structure is intended to be integrated into the surrounding green area, with a mix of modern structural design and omnipresent curves. Lights and shades are blended in a manner intended to create a meditative climate, and the choice of materials, like travertino and cotto, evoke traditional Roman architectural styles. The interior decor is mainly made of glazed tiles with light colors, with the recurrent Qur'anic theme "God is Light", which has been subject of controversy.

The interiors are decorated with mosaics creating more optical effects and the floor is covered by a Persian carpet with geometrical patterns as well. The main prayer area can accommodate up to 2,500 worshipers. Above this are galleries that are reserved for female worshipers. The main prayer hall is topped by a central dome over 20 metres (66 ft) high, which is surrounded by 16 smaller domes. The complex also includes an educational area with classroom and a library, a conference centre with a large auditorium, and an area where exhibitions are held.

The outcome is an architecture made of repetitious designs and geometric patterns, where an important role is played by the light aimed to create a meditative atmosphere and various tricks of light as well. The mosque contains several palm-shaped columns, which represent the connection between God and the single devotee.

=== Features ===
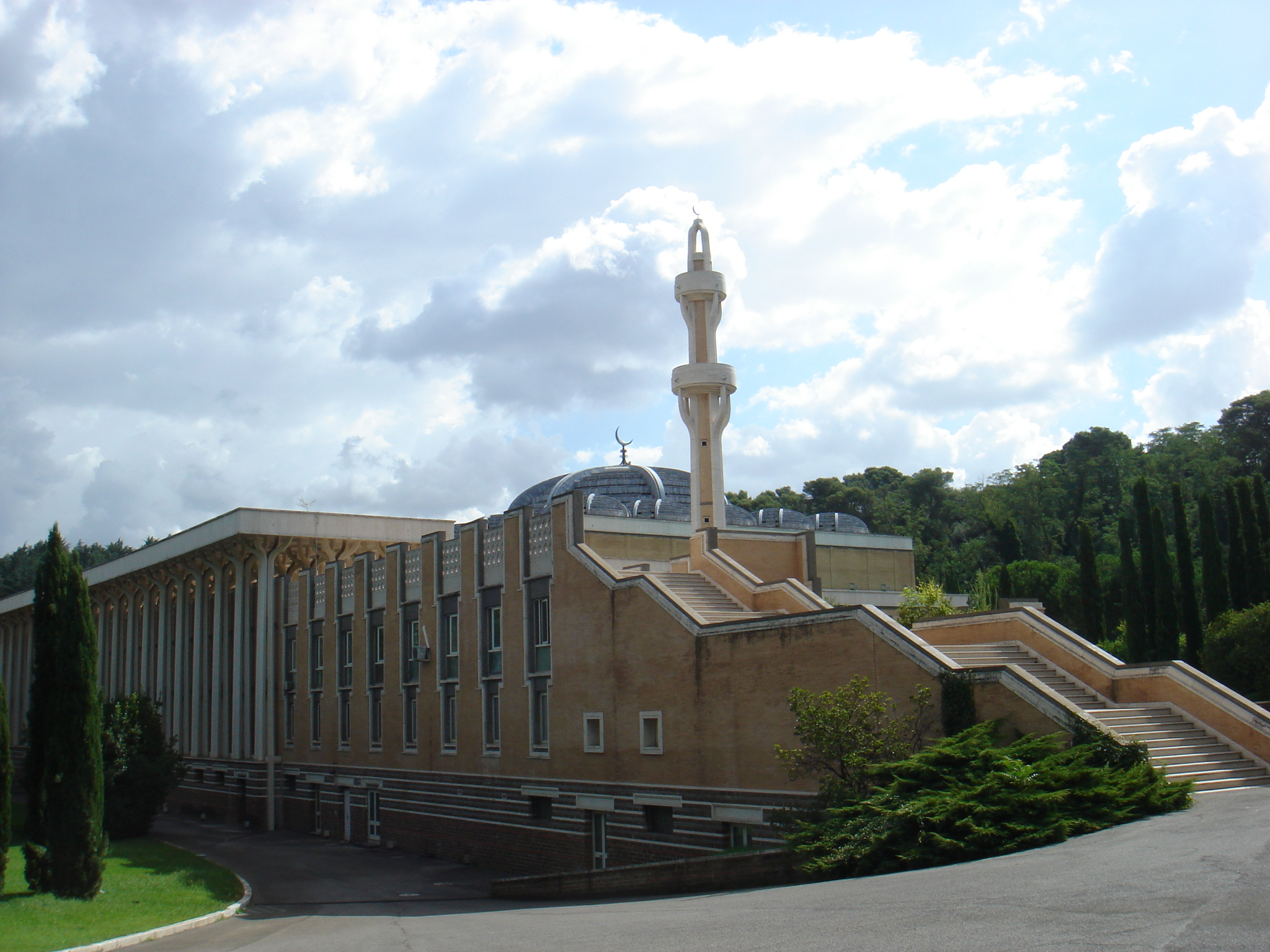
The exterior of the mosque from a front-view.

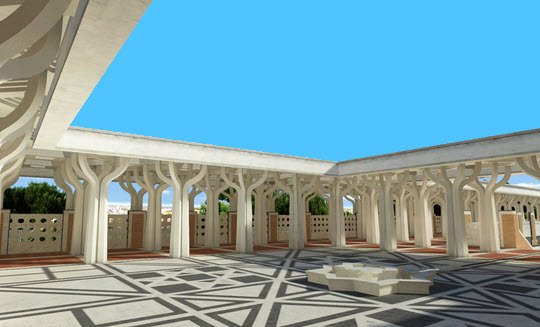
The pillars of the mosque right before entering.

The construction of the Mosque of Rome played a vital part during the 1990s as the religion had compounded throughout the world. Its growth to the western section of the world was one of the reasons the mosque was built in the first place. An abundance of Muslims in Rome and countries surrounding it had finally received a holy sanctuary. The design of the mosque is vast as it holds nearly 2,500 people in the prayer area. Architects Paolo and Sami decided to add another small private prayer room holding up to 150 worshippers. They would proceed to add classrooms/libraries for educational purposes as well as an auditorium for important conferences regarding business/events for the mosque. To top all of this included in the Mosque are two residential complexes, one for the Imam to live in, and the other for visitors coming to live the experience of the largest mosque in Europe. The scale of this mosque is about 28,000 square metres (300,000 sq ft) and is filled with beautiful mosaics and calligraphy, held by large pillars on the outside of the mosque which are measured around 80 metres (260 ft). Southwest of the prayer hall is where the minaret is located while the prayer hall itself is about 8 metres (26 ft) above the ground level.

The prayer hall is topped by one central dome which has a diameter of more than 8 metres (26 ft) and is surrounded by sixteen smaller domes all around the mosque. While designing the mosque, its construction was split into two parts one being the prayer hall which is if not the most important room in the building and the other part fulfils all the other functions from mosque (classrooms, auditorium, wudu area, etc.) The second part of the mosque was built underneath the prayer hall and resembles an "H" shape. For the women in this mosque, they have their own prayer section which is about a one-fourth of men's prayer hall and is also below them downstairs.

== Finances ==
Mosque of Rome in 2017

Estimates of the cost of the mosque range from €40 to €50 million after all construction/material wages. The estate in which the mosque is located was granted by the city in Rome. Other Muslim countries played a vital role in terms of moral support and helped financed the mosque itself. The Moroccan and Turkish government provided incentive funding for construction of the main prayer hall along with the small prayer section located downstairs. The governments of Algeria, the United Arab Emirates, Bahrain, Bangladesh, Brunei, Egypt, Indonesia, Iraq, Jordan, Kuwait, Libya, Malaysia, Mauritania, Oman, Pakistan, Qatar, Saudi Arabia, Senegal, Sudan, Tunisia, and Yemen all made contributions towards construction costs for the largest mosque in Europe; with the Government of Saudi Arabia making a contribution of nearly €20 million. To put into perspective, the amount of money that was needed for the project, compares with a little over $32,000 per square meter or $3,000 per square foot.

== Organization ==
The current Imam of the mosque is the Sheikh Salah Ramadan Elsayed, Al-Azhar University graduate and former member of the Democratic Party. Former Deputy Khalid Chaouki was president of the Cultural Centre between 2017 and 2019. Former Imams include:

- 1983–1993: Muhammad Nur al-Din Isma'il
- 1993–2006: Mahmud Hammad Shwayta
- 2007–2010: Ala' al-Din Muhammad Isma'il al-Ghobashi
- 2010–2013: Ahmed Al-Saqqa
- 2013–2016: Muhammad Hassan

== See also ==
- Islam in Italy
- List of mosques in Europe
